= Fort Boyard (game show) =

French game show

- Logo of Fort Boyard from 2010 to 2013
- Also known as: Les Clés de Fort Boyard
- Genre: Game show
- Created by: Jacques Antoine; Jean-Pierre Mitrecey; Pierre Launay
- Presented by: Patrice Laffont (1990–1999); Jean-Pierre Castaldi (2000–2002); Olivier Minne (2003–2025); Cyril Féraud (2026–present)
- Theme music composer: Paul Koulak
- Country of origin: France
- Original language: French
- No. of series: 37 (French version)
- No. of episodes: 405 (Note: As of the 2026 season; four late-night shows from 1992 were never broadcast and these are not counted as "episodes.")

Production
- Production locations: Fort Boyard, France
- Running time: 55 minutes (1990); 75 minutes (1991); 80 minutes (1992–1994); 90 minutes (1995–1996); 100 minutes (1997–2004, 2011–2013); 110 minutes (2005–2008, 2014); 120 minutes (2009); 95–110 minutes (2010); 130–140 minutes (2015–)
- Production company: Adventure Line Productions

Original release
- Network: France 2 (Note: Known as Antenne 2 for the first two series)
- Release: 7 July 1990 – present

Related
- Fort Boyard UK; The Crystal Maze; The Desert Forges; Boyard Land

Fort Boyard is a French game show developed by Jacques Antoine, that was first broadcast on 7 July 1990 (originally as Les Clés de Fort Boyard, then shortened to Fort Boyard from the second series in 1991). Many foreign versions of the show, totalling over 2,000 episodes, have aired around the world since 1990.

Set and filmed on the real fortress of the same name on the west coast of France, the programme appears similar to the British game show The Crystal Maze (February 1990 onwards) which was created as an alternative format by Antoine for Channel 4 in the United Kingdom, after the fortress was unavailable to film in because of its then ongoing refurbishment (during 1989). In both programmes the contestants have to complete challenges to win prize-money.

However, while The Crystal Maze varies the type of games quite considerably, Fort Boyard tends to focus mainly on physical and endurance challenges. Although Fort Boyard was something of a pioneer in the area of game show fear and adventure, later programmes such as Fear Factor have pushed things even further, requiring Fort Boyard to react and adapt with new twists and games, including a couple of seasons in which the contestants spent the night in the Fort (this proved particularly popular in the French and Russian versions).

Broadcast for over thirty years, it is one of the longest-running French game shows and one of the flagship programs of the summer in France. Fort Boyard is the most-exported French TV format and the fourth-most exported adventure-style game show format in the world after Wipeout, Fear Factor and Survivor. In 2019, the France 2 channel launched a spin-off called Boyard Land although this proved to be less popular and was cancelled after two seasons.

== Background and history ==
=== Creation ===
In 1980, Philippe de Dieuleveult, a co-presenter of Antenne 2's La Chasse aux Trésors (the original, French version of Treasure Hunt), came close to drowning while trying to reach Fort Boyard in rough seas. He remained stuck for three hours before being rescued by helicopter. This episode inspired Jacques Antoine (creator of La Chasse aux Trésors) in the creation of the TV game show Fort Boyard.

The concept of Fort Boyard was imagined and outlined in 1986, at a meeting in the company of Antoine to find a game show to succeed Treasure Hunt. The idea of a team game show, adapted from role-playing games such as Dungeons & Dragons, taking place in a mysterious tower populated by extraordinary characters, whose goal is to find a treasure, takes shape in the following years.

Whilst looking for a set, a production team visited Fort Boyard in April 1987 and this fortification, located between the Île-d'Aix and the île d'Oléron in the Pertuis d'Antioche strait, was bought in November 1988 for one and a half million francs. The fortress had been put up for sale in October 1961 by the Ministry of Armed Forces and was purchased by Eric Aerts, a Belgian dental surgeon from Avoriaz, for 28,000 francs at an auction in May 1962. The production company resold the fort to the department of Charente-Maritime for a symbolic franc, resulting in the local authority then having to take charge of all the refurbishment works, which took place from July 1989, and ensured the exclusive use of the site to Antoine's production company. The department continues to invest in the maintenance and restoration of the fort.

=== Preparations ===
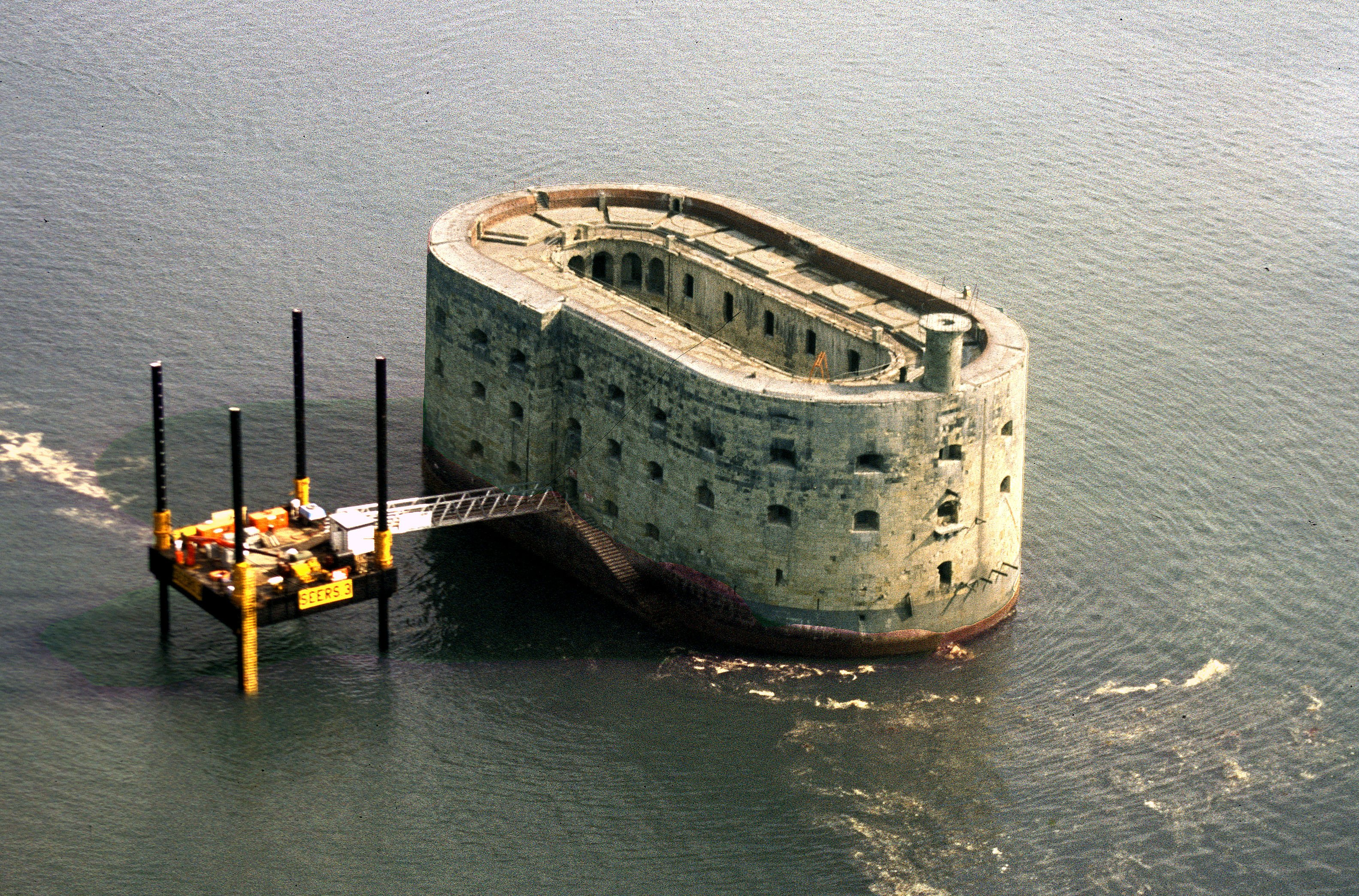
Fort Boyard, pictured in 1989, during refurbishment work with its original access platform and gangway already installed. The upper section of the fort's watchtower has not been rebuilt yet.

While still privately owned by the production company in 1988, the fort underwent a partial cleanup: stones, rubble, cannonballs, and wild vegetation were removed from the courtyard, and gaping storage bays were sealed off to prepare for visits by television producers from various countries interested in the game show concept. In 1989, a self-elevating platform and an access gangway were installed twenty-five meters from the fort's southwest façade; this allows access from a chartered speedboat via a crane-mounted crew basket, as entry had become difficult or sometimes impossible following the destruction of the eastern docking harbor beneath the watchtower. The platform also supported the fort's logistics, housing a generator and supplies of drinking water and equipment essential for filming the show. The metal gangway is also stored here when not in use.

The fort was thoroughly cleaned, with guano and miscellaneous debris removed to the mainland. The fort's openings were cleaned and fitted with windows, doors, and shutters. In the autumn, a wooden walkway was built along both sides of the courtyard at the first-floor level to provide access to the cells on that floor. The courtyard itself was split into two distinct areas. Set construction was halted in October 1989 due to the onset of winter storms. The final sets, such as the treasure room and the renovated watchtower, were not built until the spring of 1990; they were completed only shortly before the first day of filming took place on 30 June 1990. The original French version, under the name Les Clés de Fort Boyard (English: The Keys of Fort Boyard), began airing on 7 July 1990 hosted by Patrice Laffont and originally Marie Talon, later Sophie Davant, on Antenne 2.

=== 1988–1990: Sale of concept in UK ===
The first country to buy the game show Fort Boyard (then known as Les Clés de Fort Boyard) was the United Kingdom and broadcaster Channel 4. It was reported by newspaper Sud Ouest that talks with the English broadcaster, who showed specific interest and the most enthusiasm about the project, had begun by December 1988. Dutch, Italian and German broadcasters had also been approached, while French channels remained cautiously reserved. Due to difficulties accessing the fort, the game show concept was to be tested at a different site in January 1989. After discussions with the French producers, production company Chatsworth Television (at the time producers of Channel 4's Treasure Hunt and ITV's Interceptor, both also game shows created by Antoine) decided to devise a British version and began work on making a concept.

==== Filming of pilot show in London ====
A non-televised pilot of the show funded by Channel 4 was filmed in a London studio with O'Brien as presenter, as the fort was not available at the time due to its ongoing renovations. Footage of O'Brien's pilot, showing the initial idea for the "Treasure Room" segment of the format, later appears in a casting call advert for the French version, broadcast in May 1990. More footage of the pilot, including the basic set design and some key games (most of which would go on to appear in the series), is featured in Fort Boyard : toujours plus fort! following the first episode of the 30th French season on 22 June 2019. According to co-creator Mitercey in 2009, the pilot was filmed in February 1989 at Elstree Studios. Six English contestants took part. To be as close as possible to reality, a quarter of the Fortress had been built in the studio using metal structures with 18 cells installed for playing games, which were all tested for the first time. Tigers were also present in the recording, as well as a large statue of Sphinx which posed puzzles (this idea was slightly revised later, with the creation of the Father Fouras character in the watchtower) and some characters like the wrestler. According to O'Brien, the recording of the pilot cost 2 million francs (around €304,900), a record at the time. In June 2022, an out of sync twenty-minute edit of the pilot was uploaded on social media by Pierre Launay.

It is said that the considerable changes that Channel 4 wanted to make to the format could not be possible on the Fort, as each broadcaster producing their own version at the time had to strictly follow the French format. Chatsworth were also required by the French producers, but declined, to film their version first in November 1989. As Channel 4 had commissioned the show for a full series, producer Malcolm Heyworth contacted Fort Boyard's creator Jacques Antoine about developing an alternative format, with a proposal that it used thematic zones as a means of keeping the show visually fresh. The concept of The Crystal Maze was developed in just "two days", creating a game that, although similar to Fort Boyard, is substantially different in terms of presentation and style. According to host Richard O'Brien, the original outlined concept was "kind of like Dungeons and Dragons", with the presenter acting as "Dungeon Master". Channel 4's The Crystal Maze first aired on 15 February 1990, five months before the French series.

=== Later UK versions ===
Channel 5 later bought the rights to Fort Boyard and made their own British version, using the now refurbished set, which aired from 16 October 1998 to 29 December 2001 for four series.

== Cast ==
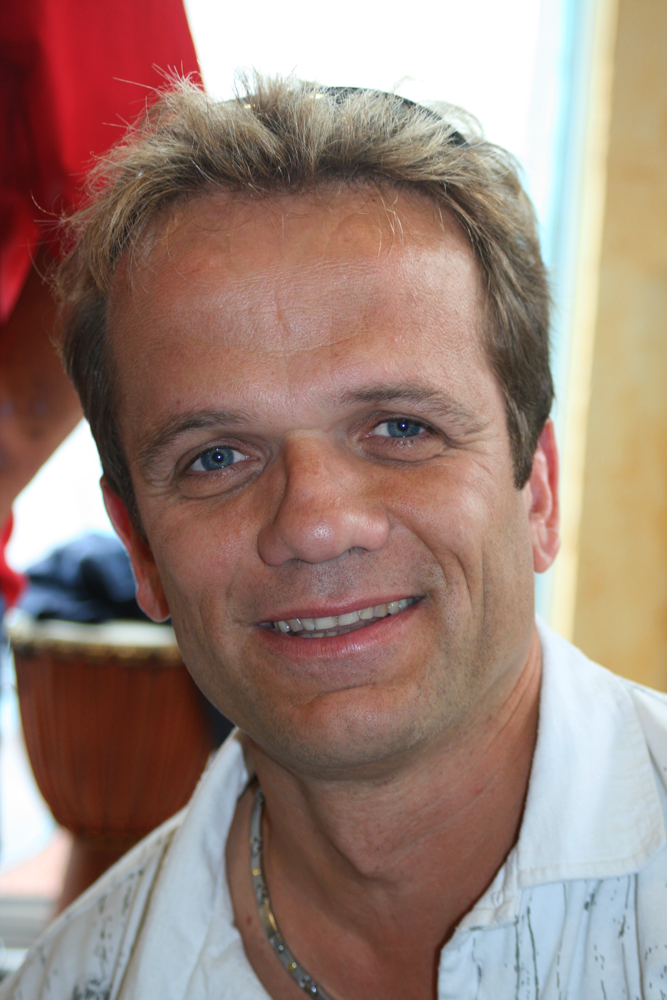
André Bouchet, 2009. (Passe-Partout)

There is a resident Fort Boyard cast, who first appeared in the French version, and were subsequently featured in most of the other international formats, including the original UK versions, however these were all excluded for Fort Boyard: Ultimate Challenge:

- Jacques (1990–) and Jules (1990–2009) (André Bouchet and Alain Prévost respectively) are two dwarves who lead the team through the Fort to the next challenge. Denis (Anthony Laborde) later in the show replaces Jules, who retired in 2010. Denis has appeared in the foreign versions since 2000 (replacing Jules) and from 2004 in the French series. The three are called Passe-Partout, Passe-Temps, and Passe-Muraille respectively in the French version. Jacques (Passe-Partout) is also responsible for locking the contestants in the cells of the Fort if they fail to get out within the time limit; whilst Jules (Passe-Temps), in later series, Deni (Passe-Muraille) takes contestants to the Watch Tower. In duel versions, Deni plays the same role of Jacques. This is because two teams are playing at the same time.
- Monique (1991–1997, 1999–2005, 2007–) (Monique Angeon) turns a statue shaped as a tiger's head to release the gold or close the gate in the 'Treasure Room'. She is called Felindra in the French & Lebanese versions and was absent in 1998 and in 2006. In 1998, the unnamed Tiger Master (Thierry Le Portier) performs this role. He is called Major in the French version. While in 2006, Thierry Le Portier's daughter, Kareen Le Portier, took on the role, also under the name of Felindra in the French version. In February 2022, it was announced that the tigers would retire from the Fort.
- La Boule (1994–2013, 2023) (Yves Marchesseau, 1952–2014; Emmanuel Dorand, 2023) sounds the "gong" to indicate the start and end of time and locks the contestants in cages when they fail to get out of challenge rooms in time. La Boule is a whaler, who has possibly found refuge in the Fort. He left the show in May 2014 for health reasons. Marchesseau died of oesophageal cancer and diabetes in September 2014 at the age of 62. Since leaving, Felindra, the tiger tamer, handles the sound of the gong (now inside the Treasure Room) with her whip until this role was taken over by a new character, Big Boo, starting in 2020. The character will return in 2023, this time played by Emmanuel Dorand.
- Mr Boo (2013–2019) and Lady Boo (2011–) the two wrestlers. Mr Boo has replaced La Boule since 2014 by taking prisoners to the dungeon, the role was later taken over by Big Boo in 2020.

As of 2014, there have been 41 characters in the French version. Most appeared in various games on the fort.

== Famous contestants ==
There was a special "TV presenter" episode in 1991, followed by two episodes in 1992 featuring celebrities playing for charities. Between 1993 and 2009, all teams now played for charities, and at least one member was a celebrity. The proportion of celebrities among the contestants increased until, from 1998 onwards, they comprised the entire team, with a few exceptions.

Those that have taken part over the years include: cyclist Laurent Fignon, Formula 1 driver Romain Grosjean in 2019, figure skating champion Brian Joubert (appearing in 2004, 2007, 2008 and 2012), Djibril Cissé, Omar Sy, R&B singer Leslie (in 2002, 2003 and 2013), Tony Parker and Eva Longoria in 2009. Many former/new hosts of the show have often appeared as contestants.

In 1997, a series of boybands would be featured. These include 2Be3 and Worlds Apart.

However, in 2010 the formula was dramatically changed and the squads, of four members each, did not consist of any celebrities for the first time since 1992. The "duel" format was used that year. The celebrities returned in 2011 playing for charity. In 2019, French World Cup winning footballer Adil Rami was sacked by Olympique de Marseille for reportedly missing training to appear on the show.

In 2026, an anonymous candidate is now integrated into each celebrity team.

=== Other series ===
In the Argentine version of the show, aired in 1999 and 2000, a celebrity joined the four other people to help them on their challenges.

Ukrainian President Volodymyr Zelenskyy participated in their version of the show in 2004, when he was a comedian and is thus the only head of state to have taken part in the show.

In most series of the Danish and Swedish versions, teams have consisted entirely of celebrities. In the 2010 and 2012 series of the Finnish version, team members were celebrities. Most (or all) episodes of the Russian series consisted of famous national singers, actors, TV presenters and sportsmen.

In the 2013 Canadian version, the teams consisted of 24 participants in total; 12 celebrities and 12 members of the public, divided into six teams of four equally.

In the Moroccan version, aired in early 2015 but filmed the previous year, three celebrities joined teams with two unknown people for the challenges. The first episode of Jazirat Al Kanz aired on 24 February and was watched by 6.4 million viewers, a record 59% audience share for 2MTV.

== Fort Boyard around the world ==
International versions of Fort Boyard (map correct as of 2018)

Fort Boyard is a French game show first broadcast in 1990; however the fort is also used by television stations from other countries in order to produce their own (typically modified) versions, using part of the technical teams and characters of the original French show.

Filming takes place during the spring and summer months (typically from May to July, or until August in 2000 due to a large number of countries attending) each year. Foreign versions of the show typically last between 22 and 80 minutes per episode, depending on the country and format used. In total, 34 foreign versions have broadcast around the world since 1990. Following the ratings success of the Moroccan version, an African version was aired in 24 countries of French-speaking Africa; it made its debut in September 2019 on Canal+ Afrique.

=== Proposed versions and pilots ===
Italy has only ever made a pilot for Fort Boyard, in 1991. The host of this unaired version was Marco Predolin. The American pilot for ABC, filmed in July of the same year, was eventually broadcast on 20 March 1993. The rights were also sold to a Spanish broadcaster in 1991, and to an American producer at the NATPE television sales market event held in Las Vegas in January 2004.

In December 2005, it was reported that French producers Adventure Line Productions were in final talks with around three Indian broadcasters to bring the format to the country; however in the end this did not happen. In October 2010, it was reported that Brazil and Tunisia had signed on for filming in 2011. However, no series was later produced for either country. In December 2012, Ukrainian channel ICTV announced they were due to film the country's second season of the show. However, for unknown reasons, the filming did not take place. A Chinese version of the show was confirmed to be filmed in mid-September 2015, however it was later cancelled due to censorship worries. Negotiations were held in 2016 with broadcasters in Australia, Brazil and China.

During a media press conference in May 2026, executive producer Antoine Weber revealed that the format was still attracting interest from several broadcasters, and was confident that it would continue to be successful in other countries in the future despite there being no foreign versions filmed that year. Weber stated this was circumstantial due to timing issues as four countries expressed interest in filming their own versions too late.

=== Impacts of the COVID-19 pandemic ===
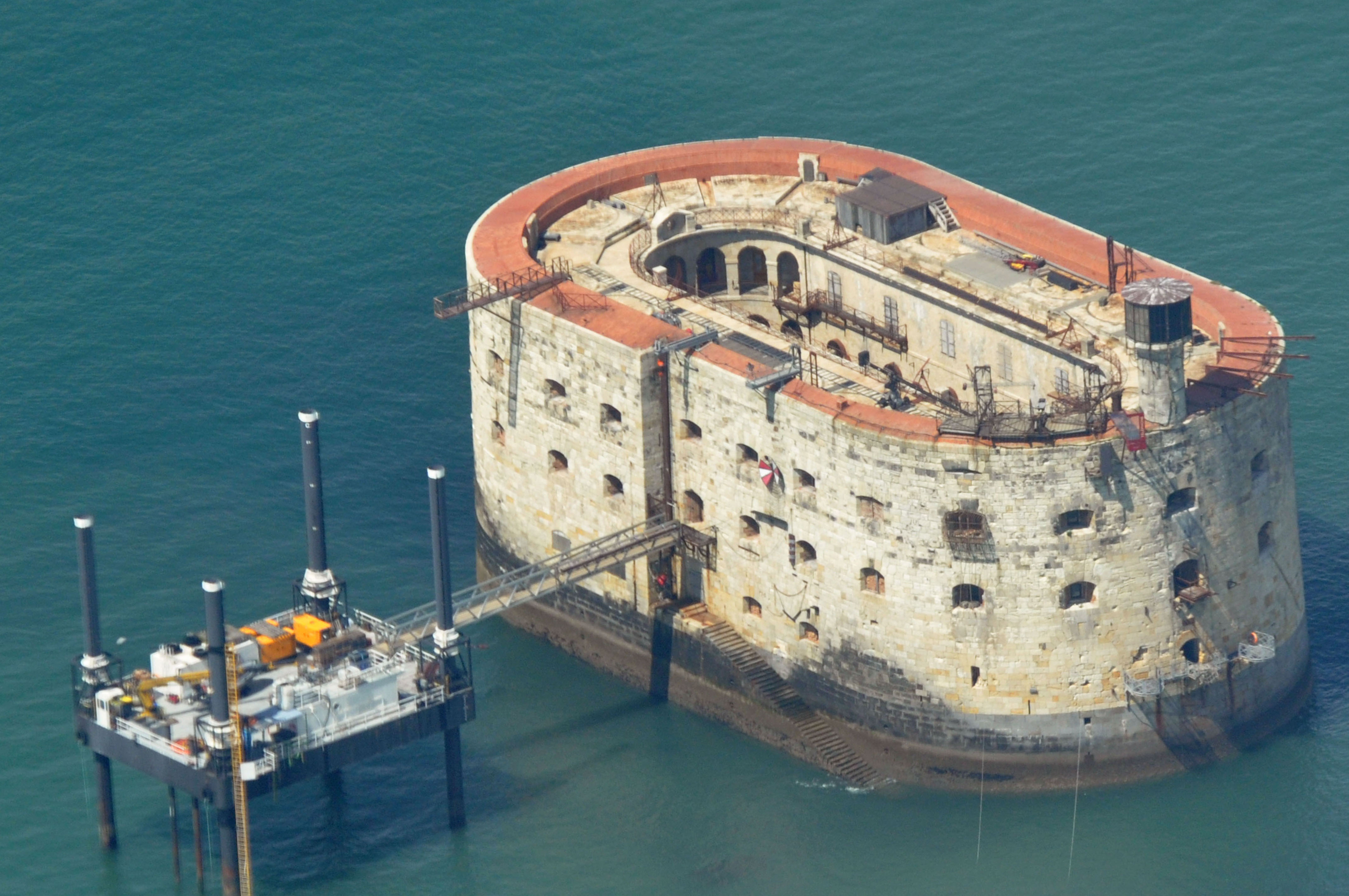
Fort Boyard, as seen from the air during the filming period (June 2021)

In 2020, due to the COVID-19 pandemic, no foreign countries chose to film its own version. Six countries were initially expected to attend that year, including Sweden, Morocco, Russia and Denmark. This marked the first and only year to date in which only the French version was filmed. Broadcasters from Sweden, Morocco, Ukraine and the Pan-African versions cancelled filming for 2021 because of the health constraints linked to the pandemic, however, those from Norway and Poland confirmed that they would return alongside Denmark and Russia.

=== Suspension of Russian version ===
Since March 2022, due to the Russian invasion of Ukraine, Banijay has suspended licensing of new formats for the Russian market and has ceased production of several programs resulting in the cancellation of the Russian version. In June 2025, it was announced that a game show heavily inspired on the French format would be filmed at Fort Alexander, a similarly designed fortress on an artificial island in the Gulf of Finland near Saint Petersburg and Kronstadt, with filming also taking place at Fort Constantin on Kotlin Island in late August after the main restoration work is completed and would premiere in the fall on STS. In September 2025, it was announced that actor Alexander Petrov would be hosting the 11-episode series.

André Bouchet, known for his role as Passe-Partout, visited Fort Alexander in August 2019; Bouchet's visit was part of a press event to promote the new Russian series of Fort Boyard that year on STS.

=== Special events and spin-offs ===
The fort has also been used for special private events in 2014, 2016 and 2019 by Russian visitors and filmed non-televised shows featuring children for the French sponsor Prince de LU from 2011 to 2013, with Anne-Gaëlle Riccio returning as host. Further mini-episodes featuring Willy Rovelli's Chef character and eating challenge were filmed in June 2020 and premiered online on the children's on-demand platform Okoo of France Télévisions, and its website france.tv from October 14, 2020. It was confirmed in July 2019 that an unnamed Russian billionaire of a large steel company had hired the Fort three times, firstly in 2014 for a team building session and most recently for his 50th birthday.

On 25 May 2026, to promote the new French season, online streamer Domingo, accompanied by Baghera Jones, Zerator, and Clem Qui Court, broadcast a live stream from the fortress on Twitch, to explore the filming location and participate in some of the challenges and games from the upcoming season. The show's new presenter Cyril Féraud and game designer Manuel Blanquet also made appearances. The content creators also filmed a revamped version of the game show on location the following day, with the broadcast of this scheduled for the end of June.

=== International versions ===
Legend: Original version Currently airing Upcoming season Status unknown No longer airing

Country/Region	Local title	Format	Presenters (Note: The years next to the presenter(s) denotes when the series was filmed and not necessarily when it was aired on television) (filming years)	Channel	Fort's Tower	Broadcast
Africa	Fort Boyard Afrique	One team (Classic)	Haussman Vwanderday	Canal+ Afrique	Valery Ndongo	2019
Algeria	برج الأبطال; Bourj El Abtal	One team (Classic)	Momo Djender and Samira Zitouni (2006, 2008–2011)	Canal Algérie	Yousfi Toufik	2006, 2009–2012
Argentina	Fort Boyard	One team (Classic)	Julián Weich and Araceli González	Canal 13	Isabel Achaval	1999–2000
Armenia	Fort Boyard	One team (Classic)	Tina Kandelaki and Ruben Jaghinyan	Armenia TV	Hrachia Harutyunyan	2009
Azerbaijan	Fort Boyard	Two teams (Duel)	Zaur Bakhshaliyev and Metanet Eliverdiyeva	ATV	Orxan Fikretoglu (2013); Farid Bey Kerimov (2014)	2013–2014
Belgium	De Sleutels van Fort Boyard (in Dutch)	Two teams (Duel)	Hans Schiffers and Alexandra Potvin (1991)	BRT TV1	Jan Wegter	1992
Belgium	Fort Boyard (in Dutch)	One team (Classic)	Dagmar Liekens and Chris Van den Durpel (1999–2000)	VT4	Luk D'heu	1999–2001
Belgium	Fort Boyard (in French)	One team (Classic)	Jean-Michel Zecca and Sandrine Dans (2006–2007)	RTL-TVI	Jean-Paul Andret (2006); Yann Le Gac (2007)	2006–2008
Belgium	Fort Boyard Belgique (in French)	One team (Classic)	Olivier Minne	Tipik	Yann Le Gac	2024–2025
Bulgaria	Fort Boyard	Tri-nations (Duels) (2007–2008) Two teams (Duel) (2009)	Dimitar Pavlov and Monsieur Rochelle (2007–2009)	bTV	Philippe Leray	2008–2010
Canada (Québec)	Fort Boyard (in French)	One team (Classic)	Guy Richer and France Beaudoin (1993); Guy Mongrain (1994–2000); Marie-Soleil Tougas (1994–1997); Sylvie Bernier (1998–2000)	TVA	Yann Le Gac	1993–2001
Canada (Québec)	Fort Boyard (in French)	Mixed (Classic/Duel) (2013) Two teams (Duel) (2014)	Guillaume Lemay-Thivierge and Dave Morissette (2013–2014)	TVA	Yann Le Gac	2014
Czech Republic	Pevnost Boyard	One team (Classic)	Libor Bouček (2016–2017)	Prima	Jan Rosák	2016–2018
Denmark	Fangerne på Fortet	One team (Classic)	Thomas Mygind (1993–2000); Camilla Sachs Bostrup (1993–1994); Sidsel Agensø (1995); Kamilla Gregersen (1996); Camilla Ottesen (1997); Gitte Schnell (1999–2000)	TV3	Ove Sprogøe (1993); Tage Axelson (1994); Ole Ernst (1995–2000)	1993–2000
Denmark	Fangerne på Fortet	Two teams (Duel)	Camilla Ottesen and Peter Schmeichel	TV3	—N/a	2009–2010
Denmark	Fangerne på Fortet	Two teams (Duel)	Camilla Ottesen and Joachim Boldsen (2019, 2021)	TV3	Anders Lund Madsen	2020
Denmark	Fangerne på Fortet	Two teams (Duel)	Camilla Ottesen and Joachim Boldsen (2019, 2021)	Viaplay	Anders Lund Madsen	2021
Finland	Fort Boyard – Linnake	Two teams (Duel)	Merja Larivaara and Kari-Pekka Toivonen	SuomiTV	—N/a	2010
Finland	Fort Boyard – Linnake	Two teams (Duel)	Ellen Jokikunnas and Ivan Puopolo (2012)	Nelonen	—N/a	2013
Finland	Fort Boyard Suomi	Two teams (Duel)	Joanna Kuvaja and Ilkka Uusivuori	MTV3	—N/a	2018–2019
France	Les Clés de Fort Boyard (1990); Fort Boyard (1991–)	One team (Classic) Two teams (Duel) (2010)	Patrice Laffont (1990–1999); Marie Talon (1990, first 9 episodes); Sophie Davant (1990–1991); Valérie Pascal (1992); Cendrine Dominguez(1993–2002); Jean-Pierre Castaldi (2000–2002); Olivier Minne (2003–2025); Sarah Lelouch (2003–2005); Anne-Gaëlle Riccio (2006–2009); Cyril Féraud (2026–present)	Antenne 2 (1990–1991); France 2 (1992–)	Michel Scourneau (1990); Yann Le Gac (1991–2001, 2003–present); Didier Hervé (2002)	July 7, 1990 – present
Georgia	Fort Boyard	One team (Classic)	Duta Skhirtladze and Naniko Khazaradze	Rustavi 2	Leo Antadze	2004
Germany	Fort Boyard – Ein Spiel für Abenteurer	One team (Classic)	Reiner Schöne and Rita Werner (1990)	Sat.1	Michel Scourneau	1990–1991
Germany	Fort Boyard – Stars auf Schatzsuche	One team (Classic)	Steven Gätjen, Alexander Mazza and Sonya Kraus (2000–2001)	Pro 7	Sonya Kraus	2000, 2002
Germany	Fort Boyard	Two teams (Duel)	Andrea Kaiser and Alexander Wesselsky (2010)	Kabel 1	—N/a	2011
Germany	Fort Boyard	One team (Classic)	Matthias Killing	Sat.1	Klaus Münster	2018
Greece	Fort Boyard	One team (Classic) (2004–2005) Two teams (Duel) (2006–2008)	Christos Ferentinos and Orthoula Papadakou (2004–2007); Christianna Malissianou (2008)	STAR	Angelos Papadimitriou	2004–2009
Hungary	Fort Boyard – Az erőd	One team (Classic)	András Vizy and Zsuzsa Demcsák	TV2	György Bárdy	2000
Hungary	Fort Boyard – Az erőd	Mixed (Classic/Duel/Individual)	Bence Istenes	RTL	—N/a	2024
Israel	המבצר; Ha-Mivtzar	One team (Classic)	Aki Avni and Sigal Shachmon	Channel 2	Yehuda Fuchs	1998–1999
Lebanon	Haluha wa'iihtalha	One team (Classic)	Tony Baroud and Karen Derkaloustian	LBCI	Gabriel Yammine	2002–2003
Morocco	جزيرة الكنز; Jazirat Al Kanz	One team (Classic)	Hicham Masrar (2014–2019); Rachid Allali (2014–19, (Note: Only presented the final episode in 2019) 2023); Meryem Zaïmi (2023)	2M	Kamal Kadimi	2015–2021
Morocco	جزيرة الكنز; Jazirat Al Kanz	Mixed (Classic/Duel)	Hicham Masrar (2014–2019); Rachid Allali (2014–19, 2023); Meryem Zaïmi (2023)	2M	Kamal Kadimi	2023–2024
Morocco	جزيرة الكنز; Jazirat Al Kanz	One team (Classic)	Hamza Filali and Rajaa Belmir (2024)	CHADA TV	Kamal Kadimi	2026
Netherlands	De Sleutels van Fort Boyard	One team (Classic)	Bas Westerweel and Ria Visser (1990)	NPO 1	Jan Wegter	1991
Netherlands	De Sleutels van Fort Boyard	Two teams (Duel)	Hans Schiffers and Alexandra Potvin (1991)	NPO 1	Jan Wegter	1992
Netherlands	Fort Boyard	Two teams (Duel)	Gerard Ekdom (2011–2012); Lauren Verster (2012, 2014); Art Rooijakkers (2011); Freek Bartels (2014)	NPO 3	—N/a	2011–2012; 2014
Norway	Fangene på fortet (1993–1997, 1999, 2010–2011, 2021, 2023); Nye Fanger på Fortet (2000)	One team (Classic)	Jon Michelet (1993); Lise Nilssen (1993–1996); Steffen Tangstad (1994); Nils Ole Oftebro (1995–1996, 1999–2000); Susanne Steffens (1999); Elisa Røtterud (2000)	TV3	Helge Reiss (1993); Toralv Maurstad (1994); Lars Andreas Larssen (1995–1996); Trond Brænne (1999–2000)	1993–1997; 1999–2001
Norway	Fangene på fortet (1993–1997, 1999, 2010–2011, 2021, 2023); Nye Fanger på Fortet (2000)	Two teams (Duel)	Daniel Franck (2010–2011); Jenny Skavlan (2010); Henriette Lien (2011)	TV3	—N/a	2011
Norway	Fangene på fortet (1993–1997, 1999, 2010–2011, 2021, 2023); Nye Fanger på Fortet (2000)	Two teams (Duel)	Julie Strømsvåg (2021–2022); Bernt Hulsker (2021); Kjetil Andre Aamodt (2022)	TV3	Karen-Marie Ellefsen (2021); Triana Iglesias (2022)	2021, 2023
Poland	Fort Boyard	One team (Classic)	Robert Gonera and Katarzyna Glinka (2008) (Note: Two seasons were filmed in 2008; the first was broadcast that autumn, with the second aired in spring 2009)	TVP2	Janusz Weiss	2008–2009
Poland	Fort Boyard Polska	Two teams (Duel)	Elżbieta Romanowska and Mariusz Kałamaga	Viaplay	Tamara Gonzalez Perea	2021, 2022
Romania	Fort Boyard România	One team (Classic)	Paul Ipate and Octavian Strunilă	Pro TV	Marius Manole	2017
Russia	Форт Боярд	One team (Classic)	Leonid Parfyonov and Yelena Khanga	NTV	Vadim Gushchin	1998
Russia	Форт Боярд	One team (Classic)	Sergey Brilev and Yanina Batyrchina	Rossiya 1	Nikolay Denisov	2002
Russia	Форт Боярд	One team (Classic)	Leonid Yarmolnik and Oxana Fedorova	Rossiya 1	Vasily Livanov (2003); Aleksandr Adabashyan (2004)	2003–2004
Russia	Форт Боярд	Two teams (Duel)	Leonid Yarmolnik, Ekaterina Konovalova and Elena Korikova	Rossiya 1	Aleksandr Filippenko	2006
Russia	Форт Боярд	Two teams (Duel)	Nikolai Valuev and Anna Ardova	Channel One	Viktor Verzhbitsky	2013
Russia	Форт Боярд	One team (Classic)	Sergey Shnurov (2019); Sergey Burunov (2021)	STS	Olivier Siou	2019; 2021
Serbia	Fort Boyard	Tri-nations (Duels)	Ivan Jevtovic (2007–2008)	Fox televizija	Philippe Leray	2008–2009
Slovakia	Pevnosť Boyard	One team (Classic)	Stano Pavlík; Andrea Timková (1998); Kveta Horváthová (1999)	TV Markíza	Ľubo Gregor (1998); Marian Zednikovic (1999)	1998–1999
Slovakia	Pevnosť Boyard	One team (Classic)	Martin Nikodým and Diana Hágerová	TV Markíza	Michal Ďuriš	2017
South Korea	Fort Boyard	One team (Classic)	Nam Hee-suk and Lee Hyori	SBS TV	Ji Seok Jin	2003
Spain	Fort Boyard	One team (Classic)	Paula Vázquez and Félix Álvarez	Telecinco	Óscar Ladoire	2001
Sweden	Fångarna på fortet (1990, 1992–1997, 1999–2000, 2010–2017, 2019–2024); Fortet (2003–2005)	One team (Classic) (1990–2000) Two teams (Duel) (2003–2017, 2019–2023)	Erik Blix and Anne Barlind (1990); Gunde Svan (1992–1997, 2010–2017, 2019, 2022–2023); Agneta Sjödin (1992–1993, 1997, 2010–2014, 2016–2017, 2019, 2022–2023); Kayo Shekoni (1994–1996); Hans Fahlén and Kristin Kaspersen (2003–2004); Marie Serneholt (2015)	TV4	Martin Myrberg (1990); Stig Ossian Ericson (1992–2000); Felix Herngren (2003–2004); Rolf Skoglund (2010); Lasse Brandeby (2011); Peter Magnusson (2012); Börje Ahlstedt (2013–2016); Rikard Wolff (2017); Suzanne Reuter (2019); Peter Stormare (2022–2023)	Autumn 1990; 1992–1998; 2003, 2005; 2010–2018; 2019–2020; 2022–2024
Sweden	Fångarna på fortet (1990, 1992–1997, 1999–2000, 2010–2017, 2019–2024); Fortet (2003–2005)	One team (Classic)	Gry Forssell and Henrik Johnsson (1999); Håkan Södergren and Linda Nyberg (2000)	TV3	Stig Ossian Ericson	2000
Switzerland	Fort Boyard (in French and Italian) (Note: Carpani and Steiger spoke in Italian, and Morena spoke in French.)	One team (Classic)	Lolita Morena and Enrico Carpani	TSR	Cito Steiger	1995
Turkey	Hazine Adası	One team (Classic)	Yosi Mizrahi and Janset Paçal	Star TV	Yasemin Kozanoğlu	2000
Turkey	Fort Boyard	Tri-nations (Duels)	Evrim Akın (2007–2008)	Fox Turkey	Philippe Leray	2008–2009
Ukraine	Форт Буаяр	One team (Classic)	Gregory Hlady and Vita Smatcheliouk	1+1	Bohdan Stupka	2004
United Kingdom	Fort Boyard	One team (Classic)	Melinda Messenger and Leslie Grantham	Channel 5	Geoffrey Bayldon	1998–2001
United Kingdom	Fort Boyard	One team (Classic)	Jodie Penfold and Christopher Ellison	Challenge	Tom Baker	2003
United Kingdom	Fort Boyard: Ultimate Challenge	Two teams (Duel)	Laura Hamilton (2011–2014); Geno Segers (2011); Andy Akinwolere (2012–2014)	CITV	—N/a	2012–2014
United States	Conquer Fort Boyard	Two teams (Duel)	Chris Berman and Cathy Lee Crosby (1991)	ABC	—N/a	March 20, 1993 (aired pilot)
United States	Fort Boyard: Ultimate Challenge	Two teams (Duel)	Laura Hamilton and Geno Segers (2011)	Disney XD	—N/a	2011–2012

==== Broadcast syndication ====
Fort Boyard has aired on many networks around the world. Some countries, such as Portugal, aired the original French version dubbed or with subtitles as opposed to producing their own. Others include:

- Belarus (Russian version on ONT in 2013, VTV in 2019)
- Canada (Mentv aired the UK version, 2005–200?)
- China (Hunan Television)
- Cyprus (Greek version on Sigma TV, until mid-2010)
- Indonesia (French version on TV5Monde Asie)
- Jordan (JRTV Channel 2)
- Lithuania (Russian version on First Baltic channel in 2013)
- Malaysia (NTV7 aired series 1–2 of the UK version)
- Portugal (French version on RTP1, 1994–1995)
- Slovenia (French version, mid 1990s)
- United Arab Emirates (e-Junior, later Quest Arabiya, Alsharq Discovery)
- Uzbekistan (2017 French version on Zo'r TV, 2019–2020)
- Venezuela (French and later Spanish version on Venevisión, 2001)

A number of other countries also did this before producing their own versions in later years. These include:

- Azerbaijan (Lider TV aired the Greek and French versions, 2009–2010)
- Czech Republic (ČT2 (1992–1994), TV Nova (1994–1995); Prima Cool since 2012, airs series 3–5 of the UK version and the French version since 2013)
- Poland (PTK2 Upper Silesia in 1992; ATV1/ATV Relaks, 1993–1999)
- Finland (Yle TV1 in 1993)
- Romania (TVR1 in 1992; Pro TV, 1995–1997)
- Russia (1st channel Ostankino in 1992; NTV aired the British, Canadian, French and Norwegian versions, 1994–2000)
- Slovakia
- Ukraine

In France, reruns of their own version have aired on Gulli (2006–2014), TV5Monde Europe, 1ère, and France 4 since 6 September 2014. In Belgium, since 2017, French-language broadcaster RTBF acquired rights allowing it to broadcast the show on the eve of its release in France. It was initially aired on La Une but moved to La Deux in 2020. Reruns of past national series have also been aired in Ukraine (ТЕТ, 2006–2007), Georgia (Rustavi 2, 2010), Slovakia (Dajto, 2013), Algeria (A3), Quebec (Prise 2, 2009–2010, 2024), Argentina (Volver, 2019), Lebanon (LBCI, 2020–2021), Poland (Viaplay, 2021–2022) and the UK (Channel 5 version: Challenge, 2002–2006, 2014–2015; Challenge version: Ftn, 2004–2007; Virgin1, 2007–2011).

==== Participation table ====
The year 2000 contains the most episodes filmed of any year (123 for eleven countries, including France). To date (excluding 2020 and 2026, when no foreign countries attended), 2025 has the least (15), with just the French and Belgian versions attending that year. As of 2025, the overall number of episodes filmed is 2,031, of which 396 are of the original French version over 36 seasons. Sweden, is the foreign country which has produced the most episodes to date (258 over 22 non-continuous seasons).

Table of countries and format used in all versions (1990–present)
Country or Region	1990s										2000s										2010s										2020s						
Country or Region	0	1	2	3	4	5	6	7	8	9	0	1	2	3	4	5	6	7	8	9	0	1	2	3	4	5	6	7	8	9	0	1	2	3	4	5	6
Africa																																					
Algeria																																					
Argentina																																					
Armenia																																					
Azerbaijan																																					
Belgium																																					
Bulgaria																																					
Canada (Québec)																																					
Czech Republic																																					
Denmark																																					
Finland																																					
France (original)																																					
Germany																																					
Greece																																					
Georgia																																					
Hungary																																					
Israel																																					
Italy																																					
Lebanon																																					
Morocco																																					
Netherlands																																					
Norway																																					
Poland																																					
Romania																																					
Russia																																					
Serbia																																					
Slovakia																																					
South Korea																																					
Spain																																					
Sweden																																					
Switzerland																																					
Turkey																																					
Ukraine																																					
United Kingdom																																					
United States																																					
	0	1	2	3	4	5	6	7	8	9	0	1	2	3	4	5	6	7	8	9	0	1	2	3	4	5	6	7	8	9	0	1	2	3	4	5	6
No. regular episodes (yearly totals)	40	37	32	54	64	76	76	57	59	115	123	45	35	100	81	26	72	61	78	52	71	84	64	53	71	32	42	57	34	73	11	44	37	31	38	15	9
No. regular episodes (yearly totals)	New entry	▼	▼	▲	▲	▲	Steady	▼	▲	▲	▲	▼	▼	▲	▼	▼	▲	▼	▲	▼	▲	▲	▼	▼	▲	▼	▲	▲	▼	▲	▼	▲	▼	▼	▲	▼	▼
Key: Single team version; Duel version; Tri-nations tournament; Mixed-format version; Non-broadcast pilot; Cancelled due to COVID-19 pandemic

== Format ==
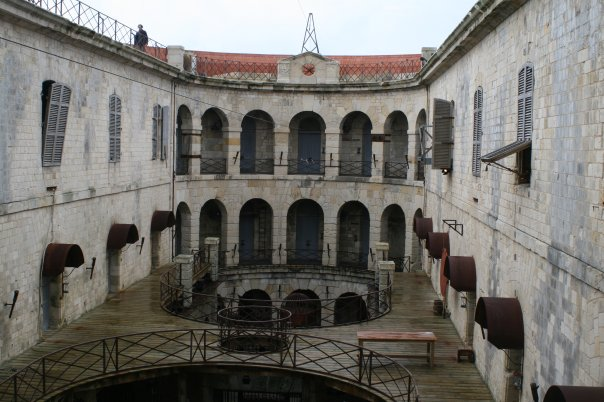
The interior of the Fort north side, seen in May 2007.

Fort Boyard's format varies from country to country, but the basics are the same. A team of friends enter the Fort with the intention of winning the gold. To do this, the contestants have to successfully complete a series of challenges set by a fort-master, who wishes to keep the gold to themselves.

The first thing done in the game is the sounding of the Fort's gong by French character 'La Boule'. Once the gong sounds the game time begins ticking down. In the UK version the game lasted for forty minutes (extended to fifty five minutes for the Series 2 celebrity special), in the French version sixty to 120 minutes, depending on the year.

In the UK's 2nd and 3rd series, entry into the fort was not immediate for the contestants. The access gate at the fort's entrance is blocked by a large horizontal bar; the team must pull on the correct rope to raise the bar above the gate, so it can be opened to start the game. This initial task was also used in the 1999 French version.

The show's original format is outlined in the following sections.

=== Challenges ===
The first set of games the contestants have to complete is to win a certain number of keys (in series 1–4 of the UK version four keys were needed, whereas five were needed in series 5; five were needed in the Quebec version, and seven in the Swedish and Danish versions. The current French version requires nine keys). These keys, once won, are used to open the gate to the Treasure Room, a central room in the Fort where the gold is held.

The challenges that are set to win the keys are located in small cells around the Fort, with small water-timers (a Clepsydre) outside to give the contestant a time limit (around 2–3 minutes, depending on the game) to complete it; in the UK version, Boyard would start the timer upon saying to a contestant that "their time starts now", whereas in the 5th series, Boyard would start it after telling Jacques to open the door of a challenge room. If a contestant fails to leave the challenge room before the time runs out, he or she is locked in and then shortly after taken away to a cage (by La Boule or Mr Boo since 2011), meaning they are not allowed to continue with the rest of the key games and must stay there until the end of Phase One. In the UK's 4th series, La Boule would give the contestant a large bunch of rusty keys. One of these keys would unlock the cage allowing the contestant to re-join the team.

During this phase of the game, one contestant goes up to the Watch Tower to win an additional key for the team (see below). This could be done once or twice, depending on the season.

Once the contestants reach the end of Phase One, usually towards the end of their game time, there is a trip to the Treasure Room with all of the keys that they have won so far. If they have enough to unlock the Treasure Room Door then the keys are entered and the gate is unlocked. However, it does not open until later in the show.

If they are short of keys to open the gate then team members are 'sacrificed' for keys, one team member for each key short (one person to win the rest of the extra keys if less than 7 in the French version from 1991 to 1996). The 'sacrificed' contestants are then placed in an underground cell and locked in. These team members remain for the rest of the game, and are therefore unable to contribute any more for the team. Although this never happened, hypothetically at least in Series 5 in the UK, if no keys were won in Phase One, it would have been impossible for the team to continue the game since in Series 5 in the UK five keys were needed to open the treasure room door, and since there are only five contestants, and no one can swim for the Captain's keys, every contestant would have to make a sacrifice for all five keys, leaving no contestants spare to get clue words to work out the code word and release the gold.

In the seasons of the French version from 2011 onward, if a team is short of keys, then team members could be 'sacrificed' by facing "Judgment" (Le Jugement), hosted by the character Blanche. Each sacrificed team member would have to complete a challenge of skill or luck set by Blanche. If the sacrificed team member was successful in his/her challenge, Blanche would grant him/her their freedom and would be able to rejoin the team. However, if the team member fails the challenge, he or she would be sent to prison. Team members who were locked in during a Phase One challenge can also win their freedom by facing Blanche and succeeding at the proposed challenge.

If the team has more keys than necessary to unlock the gate then any extra keys gained can be swapped for free clue words to assist the team in the next phase of the game.

==== Challenges ====
From 1990 to 2014, there were 185 different events (key games). The name of the game may change, but the game itself usually remains the same; where possible, this list will use the names used in Ultimate Challenge.

Note: This is not the full list of games that have been played. The years below are for when the game was played or last present at the fort, in the French version or Ultimate Challenge (some games are present but not played every year). A full list of games can be found here.

Here is a selection of some of the challenges:

List of selected games
Cell No.	Name (in France)	Year(s)	Information	Status
212 (1990–2002); 116 (2006–07)	Arm Wrestling (Bras de fer)	1990–2002, 2006–2007	The contestant has to arm wrestle against the strongman, whilst trying to grab the key, which is in a little box, with the other hand. Between their hands is a lever, so as the contestant pushes the strongman's arm down, the key is lowered so it becomes accessible to grab.	Removed (2003, 2008)
113	Asylum (Asile)	2001–2006	Upon entry, the contestant notes that the key is trapped in a metal shaft. He or she then pulls a lever, which raises the key on this axis, but the lever moves to the other side of the partition that separates the cell into two. The contestant must then pass to the other side of this through a padded door rocker, the latter operating in the strength of the shoulders by throwing themselves on the top to push it over. Once on the other side, he or she can once again operate the lever, which will again raise the key further. After several trips, the key is released from its axis and the contestant can finally collect the key and exit the cell.	Removed (2007)
114	Ball Surfing (Aiguilleur)	1998–2002	To release the key the contestant has to get one ball into the bucket at the end of the runway, four sections of which are not in position. Contestants stand on a surfboard, which swivels these sections, but if they do not move quickly enough to line up the next section in time, the ball drops to the ground, so they have to start again.	Removed (2003)
207	Barrel (Barillet)	2006–2010	To reach the door of the safe containing the key, contestants are required to move through two partitions using a giant barrel. These partitions have the fingerprints of the barrel. Contestants must have the barrel and insert it into the wall. But the cylinder has three sets of rods. So it must be run each time to find the right position to move it into the wall. After passing through the two walls, the door is safe to be opened with the same barrel and the same technique as for partitions. If they can open the door, they can get the key and exit the cell, going back through the walls, but without the barrel.	Removed (2011)
217	Barrel Maze (Débarras)	1999–2004	The player must move a barrel from one end of a maze to the other where the key is locked in a vice. On the barrel is a tool which releases the key. The maze consists of 20 barrels, including one that cannot move, and these barrels must be moved so that the key can be freed.	Removed (2005)
111 (2002–07); 102 (2008–10)	Barrel Walk (Tonneau)	2002–2010	The contestant enters a cell decorated like a wine cellar. The key is at the bottom of the cell, hanging from the ceiling. To get it, the contestant must pass through the cell while walking on a barrel lying on the ground and keeping balance by using a rope attached to a ceiling track. If he or she loses control of the barrel, the contestant can drop from the rope and put the barrel in the right direction, but doing this means the rope will reset back to the beginning of the track. Obstacles on the ground include bottle caps and large ropes. Also, a metal curled wire runs across the cell, near the end of the track, to make the game more difficult. Contestants have sometimes injured themselves when jumping from the barrel to reach the key hanging above.	Removed (2011)
211	Board (Planche)	2001–2002	The contestant has to walk along the board (similar to a surfboard) to the end and collect the key hanging from above.	Removed (2003)
113	Bungee Web (Toile d'araignee)	1996–2000	The contestant jumps into a revolving web made up of a series of bungee cords and must cross to the end to retrieve a tool. This device is then used to access the key halfway back along the bungee web. This last stage is the hardest because, as the web revolves, the player must release the key, which is going from below to above the player very quickly. As a consequence, some players have been locked in due to running out of time.	Removed (2001)
106	Burglary/Suction Cup (Ventouse); Museum (Museum)	1996– 2010–	The contestant climbs a ladder and enters the cell (a museum) via its window. Inside are a number of obstacles, such as ladders and nets, which the contestant must climb over to get to the key. If the floor is touched by anything, even if it's the key, the tool or even a piece of the scenery (the latter having happened at least once), an alarm goes off; the contestant automatically loses and is taken away to jail. The key is in a locked cylinder which is opened using a tool (either a suction cup or a magnet, since 2010) given to the contestant at the beginning. The contestant must leave out the window, still not touching the floor. In 2025, the museum test was given a new theme and the cell has been updated to look like an Egyptian exhibition.	Present
110	Buzz Wire (Secousse)	1998	The contestant has to carry a heavy machine that vibrates violently along the wire without touching it, just like in the classic game. Jaba the Pirate stands in the background trying his best to distract the player. If he or she successfully gets it to the end of the wire, the key is released.	Removed (1999)
108	Capstan (Cabestan)	1994–2007	One test where the contestant faces the 'Strong Man'. In the cell is a capstan. Each of the two must push the bar in the same direction to another, which requires a real show of strength and force. The contestant must push the bar all the way to the catch, to retrieve the key that is in the axis of the capstan. On one occasion, the contestant was injured during the game and could not compete in the show further, with a key given as consolation.	Removed (2008)
102	Cargo Net Maze (Antre filet)	1992–1998	In the Fort's cell is a cargo net in a box shape. Inside here is another box and so on, with the key lying in the centre of the maze. The contestant has to find their way through the entrances of each layer until they get to the key. They must exit in the same way.	Removed (1999)
207 (1996–2000); 113 (2010–11); 112 (2012–13)	Cannonball Seesaws (Bascule magyare)	1996–2000, 2010–2013	In this simple yet rare challenge, the contestant must bounce cannonballs of various weights into differently sized barrels by jumping on a device similar to a seesaw. A similar game returned in the French 2010 duel format and in other duel versions.	Removed (2001, 2014)
220	Chopsticks (Baguettes)	2000–2014	The two contestants must transport a vase/bucket using two giant chopsticks through a course to the basket at the end, which is very difficult. If they drop the object, they must return to the start and try again. At the end of the course are two empty baskets; when both baskets are filled the key is released. Previously, three objects were needed in the baskets to win the key; this was later changed due to its difficulty and to make the game easier. Despite that, it has rarely been won in many versions of the show.	Removed (2015)
205 (1994–2011); 120 (2012–16)	Ceiling Boxes (Bizutage)	1994–2016	In the cell, the female contestant has to climb onto the male contestant's back and grab the baton which hangs from the ceiling. Then, using this tool, she must bang the white latches on the ceiling boxes to open them. There are various things in each box, such as flour and gunge, but from one box a key falls. Also played as a duel.	Removed (2017)
113 (1990–95); 205 (2012–17)	Chapel Clock (Horloge de la chapelle); Rocket Launcher (De la Terre à la Lune)	1990–1995, 2012–2017	In the cell, the player is on the bottom of an inclined track on which a roller shell is located. At the other end, on the top, is a pendulum movement. It is on this clock is the key. Before it can be recovered, the player must launch the shell up the pendulum. But the shell is very heavy and there is a relatively small area for momentum. In addition, the clock is always moving, so you launch the projectile at the right moment. Hit the nose of the shell to the hole in the clock, the key is then released and falls down near the player who can retrieve it and exit the cell.	Removed (1996, 2018)
105	Closing Wall (Mur)	2000–2001	Inside the room the key is locked in a perspex cube which is easily opened, but when it is tampered with a door comes down blocking the exit. To get out, the contestant has to remove the boxes which make up the barrier until there's a hole big enough to get out of.	Removed (2002)
218	Coffee Grinder (Percolateur)	2012–2019	Before entering the cell, the contestant receives a pierced shovel grain. At the bottom of the cell is a coffee grinder. To make it work, the contestant must insert coffee beans in the container. The grains are in bags located on the other side of the room near the entrance. With the shovel, the contestant must take the grain to go pour into the machine whilst the floor below the machine is spinning violently to make the game more difficult. After at least five round trips, depending on the amount of grain brought into the machine. If the contestant manages to put enough grain in the machine, a green light will start flashing. It tells the contestant he/she should press the red button on the machine, so to pour the coffee into the cup. This action automatically pushes up the key in the pipe and makes it accessible.	Removed (2020)
209	Cold Chamber (Chambre Froide)	2012–2021	The contestant must guide the padlock key (which opens the glass box with the real key/canister or code inside) along a pipeline underwater and through ice. In 2013, metal bars are added above the ice tank. The contestant is now obliged to enter the water to continue the progression of the key.	Removed (2022)
119	Cotton Bales (Balles de coton)	2003–2014	A cargo net in the centre of the room is filled with bales marked with cities and other destinations and a box containing a slip of paper naming a destination. The contestant must go to the bottom of the cargo net, find the sheet of paper, and then find the corresponding cotton bale which may contain either another destination or the key. However, once the contestant enters the room, a gate locks shut behind them that can only be unlocked with the key; if the contestant does not acquire the key and exit the cell within the time limit, they are automatically locked in. The challenge was done with the rules of the red hourglass in French 2003 version (beyond the time of the hourglass, the contestant is not a prisoner but time is deducted from the overall timer). This is known as "Round The World" in Ultimate Challenge.	Removed (2015)
120	Cushioned Cell (Cellule capitonnée)	2017	In this cell, the contestant is dressed in a straitjacket, and enters a room that spins, causing him to walk on the ceiling, in an attempt to put 4 balls that are on his straitjacket into 4 holes in the room before the key is released.	Removed (2018)
118	Crazy Billiards (Billiard)	2009–2010	The contestant enters the room and finds a pool cue. They must shoot a ball on a tilted billiards table into three targets on the opposite side, to release the key in a tube. The catch is that the cage and the holes are moving constantly	Removed (2011)
214	Cylinders (Cylinders)	1993–2017	The contestant must get across a series of variously sized rolling cylinders to get to the key. In Ultimate Challenge, this challenge was known as "Candy Roll", and the cylinders were painted to resemble pieces of candy. Contestants fail more often than they succeed at this.	Removed (2018)
118	Dark Descent (Égout)	2011–2018	At the bottom of a long perspex tube (although shorter than in the previous game), that winds around the cell, is an area infested with rats and where the key/code can be found. The contestant climbs a ladder and enters the cell, which is in complete darkness, via its window. The contestant has to crawl down, locate the key amongst the rats, turn around and then climb back up the tube. In some versions, when the time limit expires, a lever is pulled blocking the exit from the cell (similar to the museum game). This test is a modern 'dark' version of Tube (Tuyau transparent), present on the fort between 1990 and 2010.	Removed (2019)
109	The Descending Rope (Bobine)	1998–2011	The player must climb a rope and guide the key through a maze, but the trouble is that the rope descends as the contestant tries to go up it. In 1998, the key was in one of four tubes suspended from the ceiling. The contestant had to unscrew the bottom of the tubes to access the key.	Removed (2012)
114	Dizzy Dash (Casino)	2013–2022	In this test, a slot machine saves tokens that can release the key enclosed in a balance. Upon entering the cell, the player sits on a chair and must operate the handle of the one-armed bandit. The chair begins to turn on itself very quickly for a few seconds. At the end of the rotation, the player obviously dazed and with the head still spinning, must walk on the beam and not fall. However must act quickly, because the chips are already falling from the machine. If player manages to reach the slot machine in time, they must collect as many chips as possible, with the container it has since its entry into the cell. When the bowl has some chips, the player must return to the seat side (back through the beam) and pay the balance in its collection. After obviously several trips and once there's enough chips in the balance, the rocker key is made available.	Removed (2023)
219	Excalibur	1991–2018	The mighty sword is stuck is a wooden stump. The contender has to pull the sword out, and then use the sword to cut a rope on which the key is attached. The cutting is actually the harder part, due to the relative bluntness of the sword, and it is at this point that people usually fail the game.	Removed (2019)
Start: 205 (first); 105 (second)	Exterior Precipice (Précipice extérieur)	1995–	The contestant climbs through the cell window where, on the outside wall of the Fort, there is a row of very thin ledges. The player has to climb along these to the next window, grab the key, and shuffle back again. This game is also played as a duel in Ultimate Challenge (known as "Terror Walk") and only present in the foreign versions.	Present in foreign versions
221	Exterior Stones (Pierres extérieures)	1990–	Hanging at the bottom of a rope out the cell window are some weights, and the key. The contestant has to pull on the rope until the rope locks into the pulley. Then the contestant must climb out of the window into a cage on the side of the Fort, and reach out for the key.	Present in foreign versions
105	The Fan (Soufflerie)	1995–1999	The two strongest contestants are sent into a room, at the end of which is a giant fan. They have to slot a perspex cover in front of it to stop the fan and release the key. As the fan is so loud the contestants are unable to hear anything; a red light goes on when there are 10 seconds left to get out.	Removed (2000)
112 (2001); 206 (2007); 114 (2008–12)	Giant Loom (Métier á tisser)	2001, 2007–2012	The contestant transports corn in a holey bucket from a barrel to a pair of scales. The corn must weigh down one side of the scales to lift the key which is on the other side. Inside the room are chickens. In later series, the chickens pen were replaced with having the contestant step through a giant loom, hence its Ultimate Challenge name. This game has been removed from the fort in 2013 and replaced by new game, Casino.	Removed (2002, 2013)
208 (2000–10); 102 (2011–15)	The Handbike (Manolier)	2000–2015	The contestant has to pedal a handbike overhead across the cell to push the key along. The key is only accessed if the handbike reaches the end and the key falls to the floor.	Removed (2016)
206	Haunted House (Manoir)	2013–2021	In this cell plunged into darkness, spirits have taken up residence and the player is going to meet them. The principle is simple: the player has to find either two pieces containing half of a code needed to unlock the clue or key or the canister containing the clue word itself while keeping their composure as spirits rage around them.	Removed (2022)
110	Infernal Ladder (Échelle infernale)	1993–2015	The contender has to hook the metal bars into slots in the wall and ceiling to climb the overhang and reach the key. However, there are only two bars at the bottom, with another two hanging down, so the bars have to be re-used. This game was not visible in France from 2012. The cell 110 is occupied by the authority allowing operation of high-tech tests (Interactive Cell, Visual Enigma etc.). This game is also played as a duel with two tracks.	Removed (2016)
112	Interactive Cell (Cellule Interactive)	2011–2013	The contestant enters a room to participate in a touch-screen-based computerised challenge introduced by a new resident of the fort, Luciole. These challenges vary from mazes to memory puzzles.	Removed (2014)
218 (1990–2007); 217 (2008–2017)	Jars of Fear (Jarres)	1990–2017	There is a long row of large jars in one of the Fort's cells. The contestant has to feel inside each jar, which contains things such as worms and rats, until the key is found.	Removed (2018)
215B (1990–97); 211B (1998–2000)	Key Thief (Voleur de clé)	1990–2000	The contestant is placed on one side of the table, on the other side there is the 'Fort Wizard'. On the table there is a white circle drawn and two handprints. The contestant must place his hands on the prints, while the magician places the key on the circle. But the key is hanging on a ribbon held by the magician. The contestant should therefore try to catch the key before the magician pulls. There are two locations on the table that the Wizard uses randomly during the test. When the contestant gets the key, they can exit the cell.	Removed (2001)
209 (1997–2000); 107 (2013–15)	The Library (Colonne du libraire/Bibliothèque)	1997–2000, 2013–2015	When the player enters the room, the door is automatically locked. The only way out is to get the key. Fake books must be piled up, allowing the contestant to reach a lever to release the key and open the door again. This challenge was only featured on the show for a brief period due to the difficulty, but mostly because contestants often tried to stand on an unstable table for height, which was dangerous. This game returned to the fort in 2013 and was located in a new cell with a rotating platform surrounding the column of books.	Removed (2001, 2016)
120	Magic Theater (Théâtre Magique)	2018	Inspired by Harry Houdini, once the challenge begins, the key becomes available. However, to leave the cell, the contestant, handcuffed and with a box containing four green balls secured to their chest, has to shake the balls out of the box and insert them into four holes located on the walls of a room that slowly rotates.	Removed (2019)
216 (1990–2011); 221 (2012–13)	The Magician (Bonneteau)	1990–2013	The contestant(s) faces the 'Magician of the Fort' in a simple but difficult game. A small key is under one of three cups he has available on the table, he turns and moves the cups with his talents as a manipulator. The contestant must find what cup the key is inside. There are three small keys in total, each key opens a padlock. When the three locks are open, the real key can be collected.	Removed (2014)
211B	Mouse Trap (Souricière)	2001–2005	Two candidates enter the cell, a man and a woman usually. They are left with a mousetrap. The one contestant sits in the cage of the trap while the other will raise the cage using arm strength. To raise the cage, the contestant must remove a plug on one side of the trap so that his/her teammate can elevate the cage up a notch. To lock the cage, he or she only has to insert the plug into the new hole. This is than repeated on the other side of the cage. By doing this, the cage will rise gradually. Once at the top of the mousetrap, the contestant can pass their hand through the cage (which contains rats/mice in some versions) to unhook the key. To exit, he or she can exit through a door at the top with some help. But if the cage is not brought to the top before the end of the hourglass, the contestant can not exit and will remain a prisoner inside the mousetrap.	Removed (2006)
117	Mr. Tchan	2007–2009	Mr. Tchan replaced the Monkey Bridge in 2007. Mr. Tchan chooses someone to be a "sacrifice". Mr. Tchan will then show a tangram puzzle which another chosen team member must replicate in a box full of creatures. About halfway through the challenge, Mr. Tchan will give a hint. When the time runs out, Mr. Tchan does a jump and the sacrifice becomes a prisoner. It has only had 2 wins out of 20, with no teams winning in 2008. He returned in 2009 with a new style of game, involving completing a pattern while the template rotates. 2 teams won in 2009, making the running total 4 wins out of 30.	Removed (2010)
208 (1990–99, 2011–19); 209 (2001–03); 206 (2004–06)	Mud Wrestling (Lutte dans la boue)	1990–2006, 2011–2019	A male or female contestant takes on a strong woman or man, who wrestles them in the mud. The contestant must reach the key, which hangs from the ceiling at the other end of the room. The role has been played by many over the years. In addition, the strong woman (or strong man) plays another game called Cotons-tiges (Joust) which also returned in 2011 and is similar to the "Duel" event seen on Gladiators.	Removed (2020)
102	Neon Water (Porteur d'eau)	1999–2005	The contestant has to fill up a long tube with green neon water which lies just by the cell's entrance. They must then carry the water through an obstacle course and fill up three cylinders with the luminous liquid. The player has to cover up both ends of the tube so that little water is lost.	Removed (2006)
215B	Net-Ball (Filet-boulet)	2004–2010	A net inclined at 45° occupies substantially the entire length of the cell. Upon entering, the contestant grasps a ball under the net he or she will have to bring up this thread evolving on it, passing the arms through to hold the ball and advance it. If the contestant drops the ball, it will return to the starting point and will have to start again. At the top, he or she passes the ball into a hole, then it will roll down the path and release the key near the exit. In some years, the key was required to exit the cell.	Removed (2011)
209	Planetarium (Planétarium)	2006–2009	The contestant enters the cell via a corridor down to recover from his head in his hands and into the openings of a large circular plate in permanent rotation. On this plateau, several balls of different colours and sizes. The contestant must return one of the balls (red) which is smaller than the others, into the hole provided for this purpose, by tilting the pan in all directions. If the contestant succeeds, the fall of the red ball triggers a system and the key is released near the exit door of the cell.	Removed (2010)
211	Pole Position (Perches)	2005–2014	A male and two female contestants enter the room. On the ceiling are the numbers 1–9 with poles attached to them. The contestants must climb the poles to find the red buttons near the correct 3 numbers. Then they must all push the buttons in unison to fry the string holding the key in a box near the entrance.	Removed (2015)
207	Powder Keg (Baril de poudre)	1992–1995, 2011–2012	In this test is a cell with a bass drum, a contestant must get on it standing to reach a transparent maze hung up high, in which lies the key inside. To successfully recover the key, he/she must move it toward the exit of this maze using the two long hooks provided. But to destabilise the contestant, boxes explode in the cell around them. When 10 seconds remain, the bass drum the contestant is standing on explodes, quickly prompting them to exit the cell. From 1992 to 1995, it was a puzzle with iron rods entwined in one another.	Removed (1996, 2013)
Ground floor	Pressure Tank (Entraînement sous-marin)	2013–	The contestant is in a vertical plexiglas cabin. Start at the top, player must open one of eight tubes coming out the sides of the cabin, with the aim of opening the nut who has the corresponding colour. In opening tool first pipe, it is a new tool for a new colour and must try again by opening the pipe that fits this colour. Player must repeat the process until it finds a new tool. In the last tip, it will fall on the plate containing the 4-digit code, it will show the team to open the lock of the safe containing the key/cartridge. To complicate the task, the cabin fills with water throughout and eels can get out from opening some pipes to come swim around. In case of panic on this part, the team has a button they can trigger to stop. This action will clear the cabin of water in a few seconds, but the test will be lost.	Present in foreign versions
105 (2007–14); 119 (2015–16)	Punch Ball (Ring)	2007–2016	The contestant is equipped with boxing gloves. The contestant then enters the cell and mounts a small boxing ring, which is equipped with a treadmill. The contestant must hit a punching bag, to hit the target behind and must keep up with the treadmill. With the more punches the target receives, the key will come down lower and lower until it is released and can be collected. The contestant must be careful not to get hit in his face by the punching bag.	Removed (2017)
221	Pyramid (Sacs)	2007–2015	In the centre of the cell is a pole placed on a pyramid base. The pyramid is filled with weighted bags connected to the pole, which also lies the key underneath them. To remove the key, the contestant has to climb the pyramid and remove each bag one at a time in order. The key is also attached to the pole.	Removed (2016)
102 (1990); 103(1991–93); 113 (2012–16)	Laser Beams/Red Alert (Topkapi/Alerte rouge)	1990–93, 2012–16	The contestant has to traverse a corridor of red wires without touching them to retrieve a key at the end. The key is located on a stand protected by glass box, which lowers each time a wire is touched. If the wires are triggered, the key becomes more and more inaccessible and, ultimately, can cause the player to be locked in (a gate at the entrance will shut if the wires are triggered five times or more). Once the contestant has the key, they can exit the cell via a different corridor running alongside (marked "Exit"). However, in 2013, the corridor was removed and the contestant will now have to go back the way they came once they retrieve the key. This test is a modern version of Topkapi, present on the fort between 1990 and 1993.	Removed (2017)
107 (1997); 108 (2011–15)	Rock The Boat (Pied marin)	1997, 2011–2015	This challenge manifested itself in two incarnations. In 2011, it consisted of a contestant having to guide a container containing the key along a rope through obstacles in a violently shaking room; in 1997 and 2012–15, however, the contestant must instead search for the key in the cabin.	Removed (1998, 2016)
206	Sand Boxes (Taupe)	1999–2003	A contestant enters a chamber that is full of sand, with wooden bars blocking the way. The contestant must slide under holes in the bottom of the bars. The contestant must then use boxes (also pushed under the holes) to reach the key. In the later series with Jodie Penfold, the rooms included snakes and spiders with the sand.	Removed (2004)
120 (1999); 215B (2000)	Saw (Scie)	1999–2000	Two male contestants enter the cell. The key here is locked into a timber block that they will have to cut, using a 2-way saw provided, to release the key. The saw is suspended from the ceiling and is weighed down by two 40 kilo counterweights, which makes handling it very difficult. They must push/ride the saw into the timber in a "see-saw" like motion to cut the timber successfully.	Removed (2001)
203	Shrinking Cell (Cellule qui rétrécit)	1992–2014	On the ceiling of the room are many keys. The contestant has to use these keys to try to open a wooden box which has three locks on it. Each lock requires a different key. The drawback is that the ceiling is continually lowering. This game is rarely completed as the players often forget to try each key for each lock, or lose concentration due to fear of the shrinking room. As of 2011, this game is played for a clue and also features a large snake and a smaller number of keys, but the keys have to be guided along tracks running on the ceiling to free them.	Removed (2015)
114	Slippery Wall (Mur glissant)	1990–1997, 2003–2005	The contestant has to simply slide down or climb up the wall, collect the key, and climb back up, using the hand/foot grips or side wall, or slide down to exit the cell. This game is very difficult and usually resulted in a lock-in. The test was done with the rules of the red hourglass in the French 2003 version (beyond the time of the hourglass, the contestant is not a prisoner but time is deducted from the overall game time).	Removed (1998, 2006)
206	Slot Machine (Tord-boyaux)	2008–2012	In the room is a spinning, square-shaped tube on the right mechanism on the left. The contestant must go through the tube, pick up the plates, go back through the tube, and slide them through the mechanism which causes plates on the other end of the tube to come out. This must be repeated until the key is found. A similar game called Drawers was present on the fort between 2000 and 2002. The current version was removed in 2013 and replaced by a new game, the Haunted Manor.	Removed (2013)
207	Spin Cycle (Laverie)	2013–	Two contestants enter the cell and place themselves in a giant drum 'washing machine'. They run in the drum, like a hamster on a wheel, so water can fill a nearby tube which contains the key. Foam and water sometimes pours into the drum. Obviously if the running stops, the water does too. They need to run fast enough so that the water flows continuously and the key has time to rise to the top.	Present
115	Stirrups (Étriers suspendus)	1990–2013	The contestant(s) must first climb to one of two strings hanging from the ceiling. These strings are found to have a bracket with a foot hole. The contestant must advance by using these two brackets by detaching the rope from a ceiling hook and putting into the next hook (and so on) to get to the end of the course and collect the key. To save time, it is advisable that the contestant(s) leaves their feet in the stirrups. This game is also played as a duel with two tracks on the ceiling.	Removed (2013)
112	Swaying Rock Wall (Mal de mur)	2009–2010	The key is rotating on a fan on the ceiling of the room. Against the wall is a wedge-shaped rock wall that the contestant must climb. The catch is that the rock wall sways freely and if the contestant loses his or her balance, the wall will fall to one side, usually knocking the contestant off and requiring him or her to start again.	Removed (2011)
221 (2001–02); 212 (2003–10)	Thread Eater (Mange-fil)	2001–2010	The key is attached to a string inside a narrow chamber. A contestant is locked into stocks, and must use only his or her head to pull the key through the chamber and into a tunnel, where the other contestants collect it. The chamber is full of creatures such as scorpions, spiders, maggots and millipedes. If they fail to get the key, they therefore cannot be released and then become a prisoner.	Removed (2011)
209 (1990–94); Ground floor (2009–2018)	Tiger Fishing (Chambrière)	1990–1994; 2009–2018	The contestant is given a fishing pole and must climb atop a cage of tigers and hook a key, pull it out of the holder, and retrieve it. The game is still played against the clepsdyre and the contestant can be locked in the cage. Unfortunately, the key may fall into the tiger cage and be irretrievable. The original version of the game is played in a cell with a false floor, walls and a stone staircase built. From 2012 until it was dismantled in 2019, it was only present in the foreign versions, but not Ultimate Challenge for safety reasons.	Removed (1995, 2019)
111	Torture Room/Jungle (Salle des tortures / La Jungle)	1990–1994, 2010–2016	The contestant has to traverse a series of ropes, rings, bars, and ladders attached to the ceiling to reach the key. As of 2015, however, when the contestant enters the room, a gate locks shut behind them that can only be unlocked with the key; if the contestant does not acquire the key and exit the cell within the time limit, they are automatically locked in.	Removed (1995, 2017)
224	Tube (Tuyau transparent)	1990–2010	At the top of a long perspex tube that winds up to the ceiling is the key. The contestant has to crawl up, grab the key and then slide back down. It has been adapted for the Ultimate Challenge and the 2011 French version, among others, as Dark Descent (Egout).	Removed (2011)
107	Turnstile (Tourniquet)	1998–2012	The contestant has to unscrew a panel to get to the key, whilst avoiding the revolving paddles of the turnstile. In 1998–99 there was also a metal grid, which meant the contestant had to run forwards, but that was changed in 2000 for safety reasons. The turnstile was removed in 2013 and the cell was taken by The Library, which has returned after a 12-year absence.	Removed (2013)
211	Unstable Table (Table instable)	2000	One contestant lies atop a plastic table and has to balance while the other team member turns a crank to raise the hammock. Once the hammock is high enough, the person on the hammock can reach the key when a lever is pulled by the one turning the crank.	Removed (2001)
213 (1990–94); 111 (1998); 112 (2006–08)	Wall Walk/The Cornice (Corniche)	1990–1994, 1998, 2006–2008	This test is probably one of the games that has generated the most prisoners, due to its extreme difficulty. A wall stands the length of the cell. On this wall is a ledge halfway up to about 2 cm wide. The contestant must move forward on this ledge, using the ceiling to help them, to retrieve the key that is at the end of it. Once the key is recovered, he or she must come back the same way, taking care not to fall from the ledge and risk getting locked in. If the contestant falls from the ledge it is near impossible to exit the cell. In 1998, a variation of the game was made so the contestant could easily exit the cell. A two player version was also created in 2005, but removed in 2006 when the original game returned in the same cell (112).	Removed (1995, 1999, 2009)
213	Water Buckets (Tapis roulant); Fire Department(Caserne)	1995–	Above a treadmill, hanging on the ceiling, are a series of buckets containing water. The contestant has to jog on the treadmill, lift down the buckets and pour the water into a tube. This tube leads into another, so that the key is pushed upwards by the water.	Present
120	Wine Cellar (Dauphin)	2000–2011	The player, secured to a rope, has to follow the rope through an obstacle course requiring them to climb over and under a series of bars to grab a key and return the same way. The rope has just enough slack to allow the contestant to move through the course, but, if the key is dropped, it cannot be retrieved.	Removed (2012)

New Games for 2011

- Visual Enigma (cell 112)

New Games for 2012

- Gagarin (cell 109) – A similar game, also using a gyroscope, was present on the fort between 1995 and 1997.
- Anvil (outside, between the fort and the platform)
- Balance (outside, between the fort and the platform)

New Games for 2013

- Cuisine de Willy (cell 215A) – First time this cell has been used since 1991. A new character, an Italian Chef, played by Willy Rovelli (a contestant in 2012) appears in the fort's kitchen. This cell is not used in international versions and is covered up.
- Père Fouras Show (cell 215B) – Replaced the Code Braille in French version, known as Creature Code in Ultimate Challenge. In the international versions, Creature Code is still present on the fort.

Note: Some clue games are also played as key games and vice versa.

=== Adventures/Ordeals ===
Once again in this part of the game the contestants have to complete a series of games, but instead of playing for keys they are playing for clue words. In addition, these games are more physically challenging to the contestants than those played in the challenges. Before these adventures, one contestant goes to the Watch Tower to try to win a clue word. The adventures last around 10–20 minutes long in the UK version, this depends on how long the team take to win the required number of keys needed to open the Treasure Room gate.

The objective in this phase is to try to figure out the codeword, which, if answered correctly, will release the gold. To do this, they must try to win clue words to help them in working out the codeword (password in the UK version from series 2 onwards).

These clue words can be placed either before or after the password to make a word or common phrase. For example: if the clues words were Hall and Line then the password would be DANCE, as in DANCE Hall and Line DANCE.

To make it even more difficult to get the clue word, a time limit (3 minutes usually; occasionally between 2:00–3:30 minutes) is placed on each game. The clue words are usually written on pieces of paper and kept in canisters filled with gunpowder, and if the contestant fails to reach the canister in the allotted time the clue word explodes and the contestant loses the challenge. Unlike the challenges, players are not locked in if they fail to win the clue word.

==== Adventures ====
From 1991 to 2011, there were 71 different adventures. This section details some of Fort Boyard's most famous games. The name of the game may change from country-country; but the game itself remains the same (like in the challenges, where possible, names from Ultimate Challenge will be used). The years below are for when the game was played or last present at the fort, in the French version or Ultimate Challenge.

List of selected games
Name (in French)	Year(s)	Information	Status
Leap of Faith (Saut de l'Ange)	1996–	The contestant has to do a bungee jump off the side of the Fort. After jumping, while hanging upside down, the player has to climb partway up the rope and undo the canister which contains the clue word. Cowardice will automatically cost the clue.	Present
Balloon Breaker (Rocket-man)	2006–	A contestant is harnessed to the inner walls of the fort. The rest of the team must pull the rope attached to the contestant all the way down to the ground and release it sending the one in the harness flying upwards. Meanwhile, they have to break a balloon containing the number code using a stick given before the challenge. This number code must be used to unlock the box containing the clue scroll.	Present
Bouées (Buoys)	1992	A contestant must first lower the net of the plaice then join floating buoys. He must go from buoy to buoy to find on which the clue is indicated.	Removed (1993)
Human Catapult (Saut à l'élastique)	1991–	The contestant stands at the top of the Fort, looking down into the centre. He or she must then jump off the platform, and grab the canister which contains the clue while bouncing back up again. Some contestants failed to pluck the courage to make the jump, in which case, the clue is automatically lost.	Present
The Catapult (Catapulte)	1995–2004; 2012–2013	In the centre of the Fort sits the contestant, attached to bungee cords. Another member of the team stands with an axe, while the rest of the team turns a wheel which takes the strain of the bungee. The person with the axe then has to cut the rope, which catapults the contestant up into the air. The contestant has to look out for the clue word, which is written on a large blackboard somewhere on the top of the Fort. Since 2003, instead of a clue word, the contestant has to look out for a 4-digit code, which is written on a large blackboard somewhere on the top of the Fort. The team then have to unlock a box with the code to get the clue canister. This game was replaced with Balloon Breaker in 2006. The game returned in the 2012 Halloween Special. The game is similar, but the contestant is launched by a detonator pressed by another member of the team.	Removed (2014)
Caterpillar (Chenille)	2001–2006; 2011–	Two parallel cables are strung above the 'Treasure Room' at the same location as the Tight Rope game. The contestant(s) are roped and use boards to transport themselves to the centre to reach the suspended key or canister hanging from above. In the duel format, the contestant(s) must then return to their platform, unscrew the canister using a tool and read out the code for the key box.	Present in foreign versions
Hangover/Chain Pulley (Surplomb)	1996–1999	The contestant moves along a traverse, using some ropes to move forward. They are also equipped with a stick, which will be used to break a pottery sphere to get the clue. As they traverse along, they will be hanging vertically with their feet free by the end. From 1997, they must use a chain pulley. In turn they reach three keys, which they must collect. Every time they take a key, one of the chains holding them up collapses, so that by the end they are hanging vertically. Once at the end of the traverse, they have to open a box with one of the keys, and get the clue.	Removed (2000)
Clockwork (Culbuto)	2000	The contestant is strapped into a frame which is attached to a giant clockwork mechanism. When they squeeze the top of the frame, it spins around, and traverses downwards. The contestant has to spin down to a key, pick it up and throw it down to their teammates who open a safe which contains the clue word.	Removed (2000)
Clue Seller (Vendeur d'indices)	1991–1994	The contestant enters a room named “The House Of Horrors”, where the contestant has to find a tarantula inside a bowl, and has to guide it through an obstacle course. The obstacles include a staircase in the dark, a metal cage with holes, pulleys, and the hardest bit, a grid maze to get to the clue seller. He then removes the clue from the spider and shows it on a giant magnifying glass. The producers of the show were not satisfied by the spider version, so to make it even more difficult, the contestant was now given 100 boyards to carry throughout the ordeal. The course remained the same, but the contestant now had to find 6 words on the mutant heads in The House Of Horrors. At the end, the contestant needs to give 15 or 10 boyards to the clue seller, and tell him one of the words that she can remember. If it is not the clue word, the sheet of paper will say "faux", but if it is the correct clue word, the sheet of paper will say "vrai". In 1992, the course was changed, with a ball pit, turnstiles, and an elastic net. The grid maze was also changed slightly, but it doesn't get any harder. If the contestant runs out of time, the clue will burn. This ordeal was exclusively for females and was completely dismantled in 1995, in order to free cells 201, 202 to create the Council Room, and cell 203 to accommodate the Pre-Council area.	Removed (1995)
Dark Labyrinth (Labyrinthe obscur)	1991–2001	The player must go through a series of chambers, which are in complete darkness, and follow a string and the other players' directions (with the use of a map) to reach the end. Along the way, the contestant goes through some water, coal, a skeleton, and such features to eventually meet a room filled with light by a flame held by a naked person of the gender opposite to the player. The clue is written somewhere on the person's body, but some players miss the word due to the multiple tattoo-like prints also on the body. Although the genitals were never in view, when Fort Boyard was aired before the watershed, the topless woman's breasts would sometimes be blurred.	Removed (2002)
Elevator (Ascenseur)	1995-1997	At first, the player will have to abseil down along the wall of the fort until reaching a handrail that he will have to walk along to reach a ladder. At the top of this ladder, they find an elevator in which they will enter. Here ends its role. They now have to go up the elevator. 2 of their team members who remain on the terrace will have to activate a mechanism by pedaling on it in order to raise the cage. Once the lift is back up to level, they give the small key that he has found in the cage to a team member who can open the box containing the clue at the top of the footbridge. While this adventure was still present in 1998, it would not be played, and would be fully removed in 1999.	Removed (2000)
Everest (Éverest)	1998–1999; 2002–2003; 2006; 2012–	The chosen contestant climbs up two parallel ropes to reach the clue.	Present in foreign versions
Fireman's Climb (Balancier)	1999–2002	In this game the contestant has to traverse the overhead ladder to reach the key or cartridge which is at the other end. As they get further out, their weight pulls the ladder down. The game was last played in the French version in 2002, however the equipment was still on the fort until 2007 before being used for a new game from 2008 to 2010, Beam on the sea (Poutre à la mer).	Removed (2008)
The Hammock (Hamac)	2004	The chosen contestant attempts to climb down a hammock to reach the clue, but climbing down the hammock destabilises it and causes it to twist and swing even further. This challenge appeared only once.	Removed (2005)
Human Bell (Cloche)	1999–	One person is strapped into the Fort's giant swing, which is hung at a right angle to the inside Fort wall. The rest of the team pulls on a heavy rope, which moves the swing back and forth. The clue is hanging so that the swing must be horizontal in order for the contestant to grab it. The person in the swing seat has no control, so even if they want to stop, they cannot unless their team lets them.	Present
The Ladder (Échelle spéléo)	1994–	This game is suspended from the bridge of the Human Catapult game. The contestant has to climb up a thin metal ladder to get the cartridge or key hanging from above. His or her team will help to achieve this, by holding the ladder down (which starts at 2 metres 50 off the ground), which is too flexible and mobile to climb alone. The game can also be played as a duel and has featured in many versions.	Present in foreign versions
Monkey Bridge (Pont de singe)	1992–2005; 2006; 2007–2009; 2011–	Strung high across the Fort are two ropes, one higher than the other. The contender must walk across the bottom rope, whilst holding onto the top one. At the other end they find a key, which they must then take back across the commando ropes so that their team can open the box which holds the clue word. From 2006, this challenge can use the format of a duel. A contestant competes against a gymnast (only in 2006), and must move along a rope bridge, grab a sack with a key attached, and move back along the bridge. Then, using the key, the contestant must unlock a box and retrieve a code before the gymnast destroys it. The code will enable the team to retrieve the key. This game is also played as a duel in Ultimate Challenge and other versions.	Present in foreign versions
Pole Ascension (Ascension du poteau)	2003–2010; 2012–16	A wooden pole is outside the Fort, above the sea, starting at cell 119 up to the terrace. The contestant must climb the pole to retrieve the canister/key at the top of it. Team members located at the cell window 219 or the terrace throw down small blocks, which the climber uses to move up the pole to reach the top. If the team run out of blocks, the climber is unable to reach the top and can not collect the canister or key. This game can also be played as a duel with two poles.	Removed (2017)
Kayak (Esquif)	1997–2006	The contestant finds himself in a kayak on the stairs outside the Fort. The rope drops, he descends the stairs and enters into the sea where there are three baskets. Once collected and attached to the rope, his teammates pull them back in. The team can then open the safe containing the clue, using the three small keys found inside the baskets. The keys are the same, but only one key works in each lock of the safe.	Removed (2007)
Rat Run (Rampeur)	1994–1997; 2002	The contestant enters the room via a hatch on all fours. They have to progress by crawling in a barbed wire tunnel, and they need to open the 3 knotted doors which bar their way and being subjected to the bites of rats until they reach the clue which is at the end of the tunnel. Once the clue has been recovered, the contestant will be able to exit the tunnel through a trapdoor located high up and will not have to go the other way. In 1995 this was a key game, with a different version used in 2002 as one of 12 games reserved for the Infernal Machine relay.	Removed (1998, 2003)
The Searching Head (Tête chercheuse)	1996–	The contestant moves along through a series of small chambers, with only the head exposed. In each chamber is a word which the player has to shout out to the team, who cross it off a list of similar words. The one left is the clue word. Each chamber is filled with a number of creatures to scare the player, which are in order: frogs, stick-insects, rats, cockroaches, and flies.	Present
Sky Bike (Cablocypède)	1998–	Cycling along on the upside-down bicycle, the contestant comes to three rolled up flags. When unrolled each displays a letter, which the rest of the team must key into a combination lock to open a safe and gain the clue.	Present
Snake Pit (Serpents)	1991–	A contestant is lowered into the snake pit, via a ladder. The clue word is split in two, each half being written on a snake. The contestant must find the two-halves to make a whole, and to do so they have to pick up each snake and check its belly to see if one of the two-halves of the clue is on it. There are hundreds of them, but the clue is always written on the big ones, one half usually being in a barrel and the other half in one of the small cupboards at the side of the pit. Cowardice will automatically render the game null and void and therefore forfeit the clue.	Present
Spiders and Scorpions (Araignées et scorpions)	1991–	A contestant enters a room filled with tarantulas and scorpions in a chest. Three of the arachnids hold slips of paper, but only one of them has a clue word on it. In 2011, during the French version, the game was replaced by Stretcher. In 2015, the game returned to the French version as the Doll House (Maison des poupées). However, in the international versions, Abandoned Cabin is replaced with the original Spiders and Scorpions design (now located in a smaller cell nearby). Both Stretcher and Spiders and Scorpions are played in some versions.	Present
Tiger Buggy (Cage aux tigres)	1997–	The contestant is sat in a buggy which they have to pedal round the Treasure Room. On the floor are two keys, which they need to collect to open a small box inside the buggy which contains the clue word. In series 3, the contestant now has to collect just one canister which contains the code to a safe, which the rest of the team opens to gain the clue. Three versions of the game have been used: 1997, 1998–2013 and from 2014 as Safari	Present
Tightrope (Funambule)	1997–	The contestant has to walk from one end of the tightrope to the other where the clue hangs in a canister.	Present in foreign versions
Trapeze (Trapeze)	1998	3 contestants are called upon to take part in this adventure inspired by the famous circus act, but only one of them will succeed. On the 2nd floor of the fort above the inner courtyard are 2 trapezes. One for them, & on the other swing is a trapeze artist. The candidates are in the southern corridors in front of cell 219. In turn, each contestant will jump from the 1st trapeze & try to catch the hands extended to him by the trapeze artist who is swinging on the 2nd trapeze, which requires extremely precise timing. The contestant who succeeds can read the clue on the arm of the trapeze artist, otherwise he must let go of the trapeze, drop into the net stretched above the court, where the next player can have a turn. The 3 players have one go each.	Removed (1999)
Umbrellas (Parapluies)	2013–	In this event, the contestant must walk a very narrow airway strap placed across the width of the courtyard and above the Treasury Room. It starts from the balcony of the 212 cell and progresses on the strap holding two umbrellas for balance. The two umbrellas are themselves held by cables. The goal is to get a portfolio at the end of the strap. When this first action is made, the contestant must do the opposite and return to its starting point. When returned, he/she must open the wallet with a clip, since it is closed with a wire. Then it remains for him/her to open it and send the code to the team, to open the lock of the safe containing the key/clue.	Present in foreign versions
Underwater Cellars/Flooded Basement (Souterrain inondé)	1991–2013	The contestant climbs down a hole into a series of flooded cellars. He or she exits the first two chambers underwater, and then climbs a ladder and crawls along a low corridor, on the floor of which is a word written in sand. This word is washed away by a torrent of water after a few seconds. The contestant climbs down another ladder into another chamber, where underwater are a series of boxes. One box has the sand word on it, and in here is the clue. The player then has to swim out via an underwater corridor. From the fourth series (2001), the contestant instead has to guide a spanner tied to a chain/illuminated cable through obstacles in the flooded cellars to a bolted cylinder, which the player must open to reach the clue.	Removed (2014)
Wall Climbing (Varappe)	1991–	The contestant(s) must climb up the side of the fort using only the rocks on the wall face. It is usually very windy and very difficult. This game can also be played as a duel.	Present in foreign versions
Zipline (Tyrolienne)	1991–	Two contestants, one male and one female, zip-line down from the top of the Fort's bastions into the sea. Both of them must then swim to a boat. The male contestant or the first to get on must climb to the top of the mast to where the clue word is. They must drop the clue down to their teammate who will open it & shout it to their teammates. The version often played in the UK version is where one of them, usually the female, then swims to the pontoon, whilst the other has to swim over to a buoy, where he dives down deep to reach the lobster pot. Once he has it, he swims over to the pontoon where the second contestant opens the lobster pot, takes out a key and opens a box which contains the clue word. Once they have it they shout it out to their team using a megaphone. There have been a few variations to this, where the second player swims to a boat as opposed to the lobster pot. Once there, one of the pair needs to climb a ladder to reach the numbers for the other person to shout back to their team for the clue. An alternate version of this, named Raging Sea, is also played. In 2012, a new version came out, replacing the old one. This time, One contestant sits on a board facing up and one contestant is next to a buoy containing a locked wallet with the code. When the board drops, the contestant goes down the zip-line and throws the key to the other contestant. In 2017, a new version, called "T.N.T." came out, replacing the previous one. In this case, the contestant sits on the board like in the previous version, but he holds a smoke bomb in his hands. When the board drops, he has to throw the smoke bomb in a barrel on a raft for it to explode and the cartridge containing the clue to be released.	Present

New Games for 2011

- Stretcher (cell 212) – replaces Spiders and Scorpions
- Abandoned Cabin (cell 218 (2011), 216 (2012–)) – French Exclusive
- Immersed Cell
- Cell RecRec – previously Shrinking Cell
- Tanks (cell 209) – replaced by Cold Room in 2012
- Sewage (cell 118) – called Dark Descent in Ultimate Challenge
- Creature Count/Code (cell 215B) – called lotto in the French version
- Beam-jets

New Games for 2013

- Circle (outdoors, above courtyard) – Ring Run in Ultimate Challenge
- Submarine Training (outdoor, ground floor patio) – Pressure Tank in Ultimate Challenge
- Umbrellas (outdoors, above courtyard) – Balancing Brollies in Ultimate Challenge
- Vélibérateur (indoor basement, tank flooded) – Pedal Pump in Ultimate Challenge
- Hammocks (cell 115) (Duel)
- Underwater Balloons (Duel)
- Deadly Drop (Duel)

Note: Some of these games are still in place on the fort, but have not been played recently in the French version and others. Most of these games are listed by their Ultimate Challenge names. Not all of the clue games played have been mentioned above.

=== The Watch Tower ===
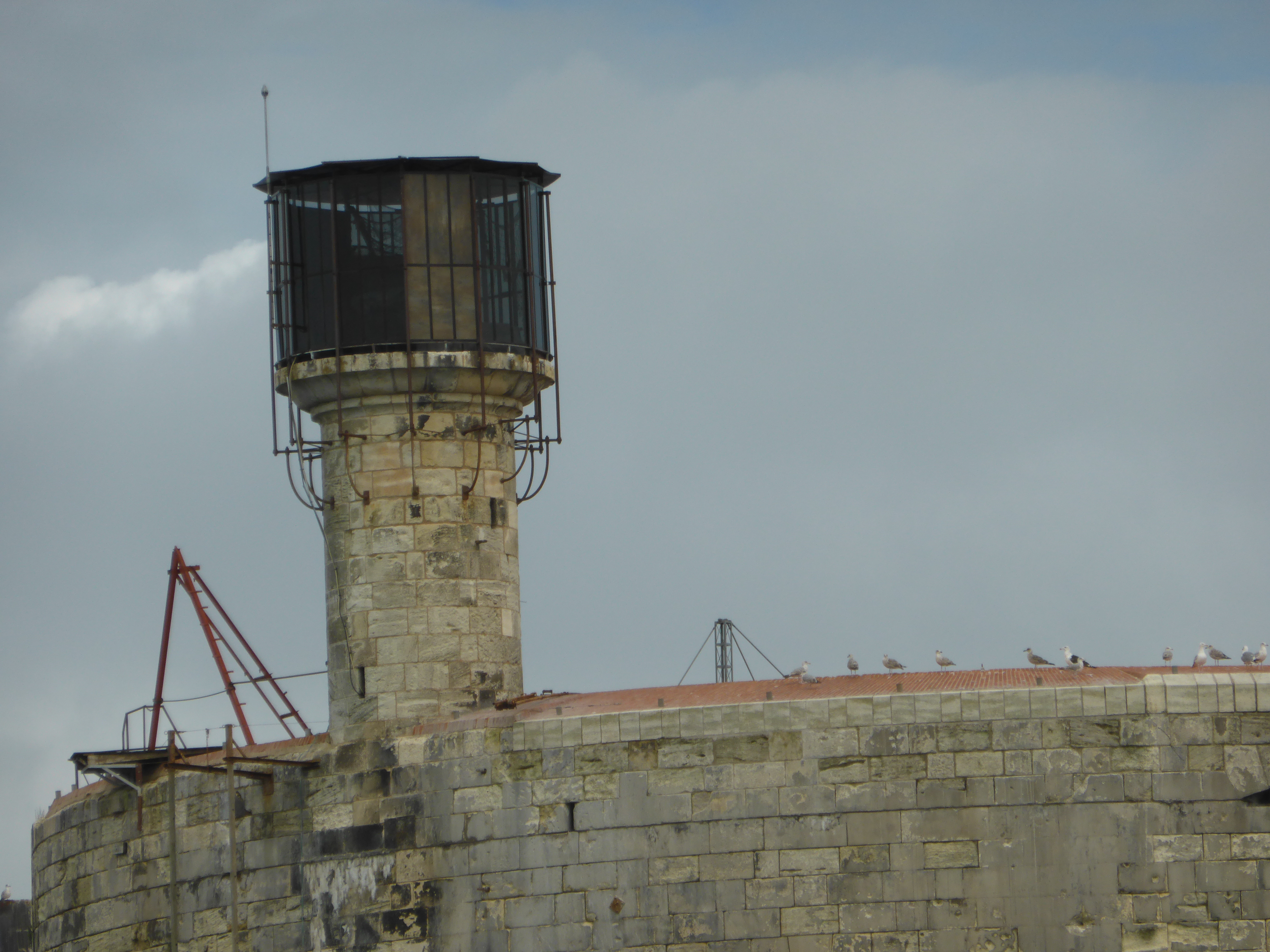
The Watch Tower in August 2014

In the Watch Tower of the Fort lives a usually eccentric character that sets riddles for certain contestants; if the contestants give the correct answer within the time limit, they receive a key. In the case of the clue riddles, the answer to the riddle is the clue word, so even if the contestant does not solve it in the Watch Tower he or she can still think about it during the rest of the game. During the riddles, the contestant can keep guessing until the time (indicated by Jack or Jules holding up a sand timer) has elapsed. If the contestant fails to guess the correct answer within the time limit, the key is "thrown" into the sea, and another contestant has to swim for it. This was always won as the strongest swimmer would retrieve the key. The swim was removed in series 5 of the UK version, but was reintroduced in Ultimate Challenge as Key to the Sea (without the Watch Tower riddle).

Since 2006, the contestants can no longer swim for the key; it is just put back where it was held. The clue word is also different and is not the same as the riddle. Therefore, the riddle must be solved within the time limit to obtain the clue.

In the French version from 2011 to 2013, The Watch Tower wasn't used; instead, there were three trips to the Interactive Cell. The second trip was a Visual Riddle, about halfway through the key games, with Father Fouras on screen. The Clue Riddle is replaced by a telephone riddle where the player is in a booth inside one of the cells and has 1 minute to solve the riddle, given by Father Fouras over the phone, whilst cockroaches are dropped on top of them. This takes form of a game, called Abandoned Cabin, in the French version. The Watch Tower was however used in the 2012 Russian version of the show (the only country to use it that year) and in 2013 for the Azerbaijan, Canadian and Swedish versions.

In 1999, Argentina's was the first version to have a female character guarding the tower: "La Dama del Fuerte" played by Isabel Achaval. This was followed by Germany's Sonya Kraus and Yasemin Kozanoğlu for Turkey both in 2000. On 4 June 2019, Swedish broadcaster TV4 confirmed that Suzanne Reuter would appear in the role as "Madame Fouras".

=== The Treasure Room ===
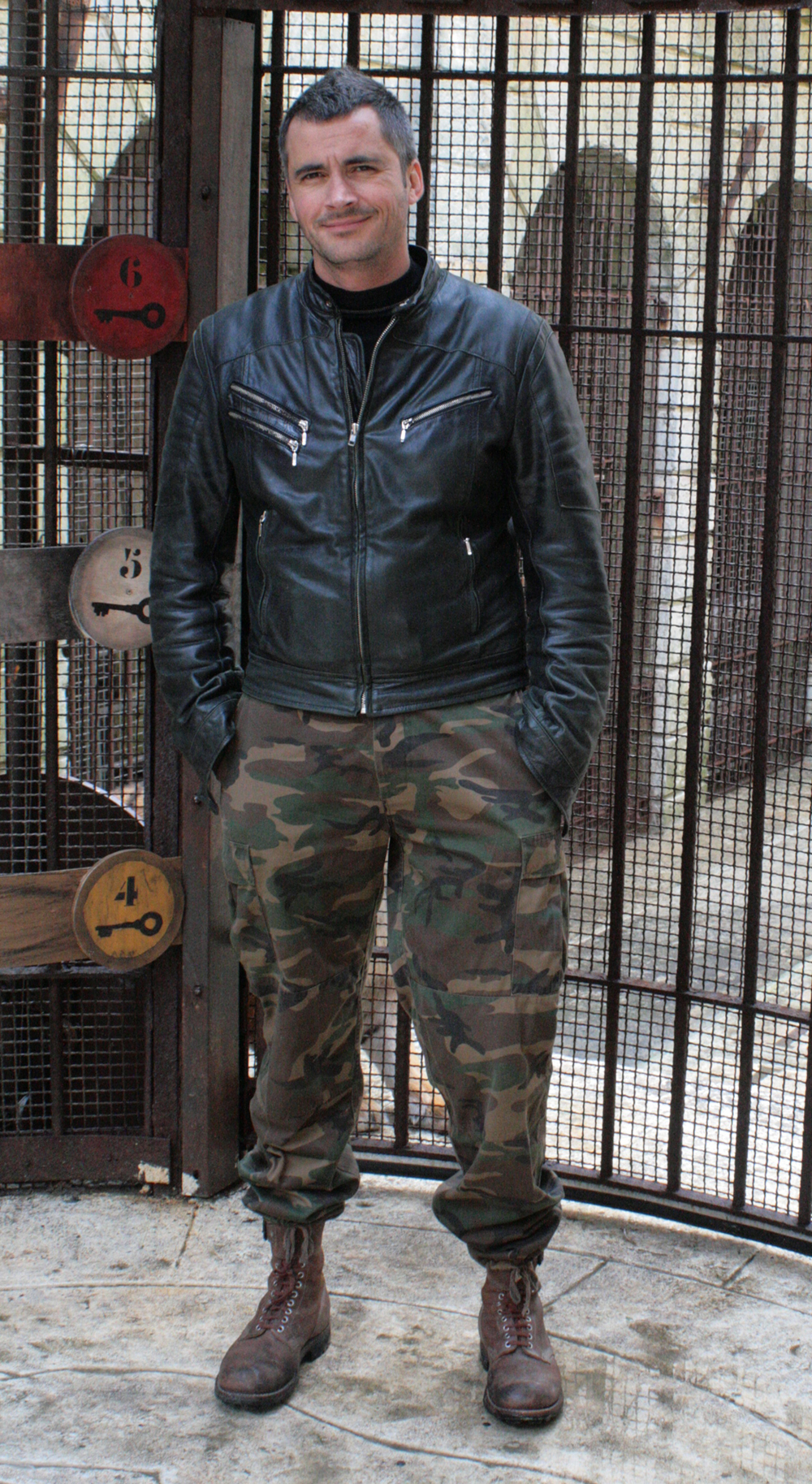
French host Olivier Minne outside the Fort's Treasure Room (May 2007)

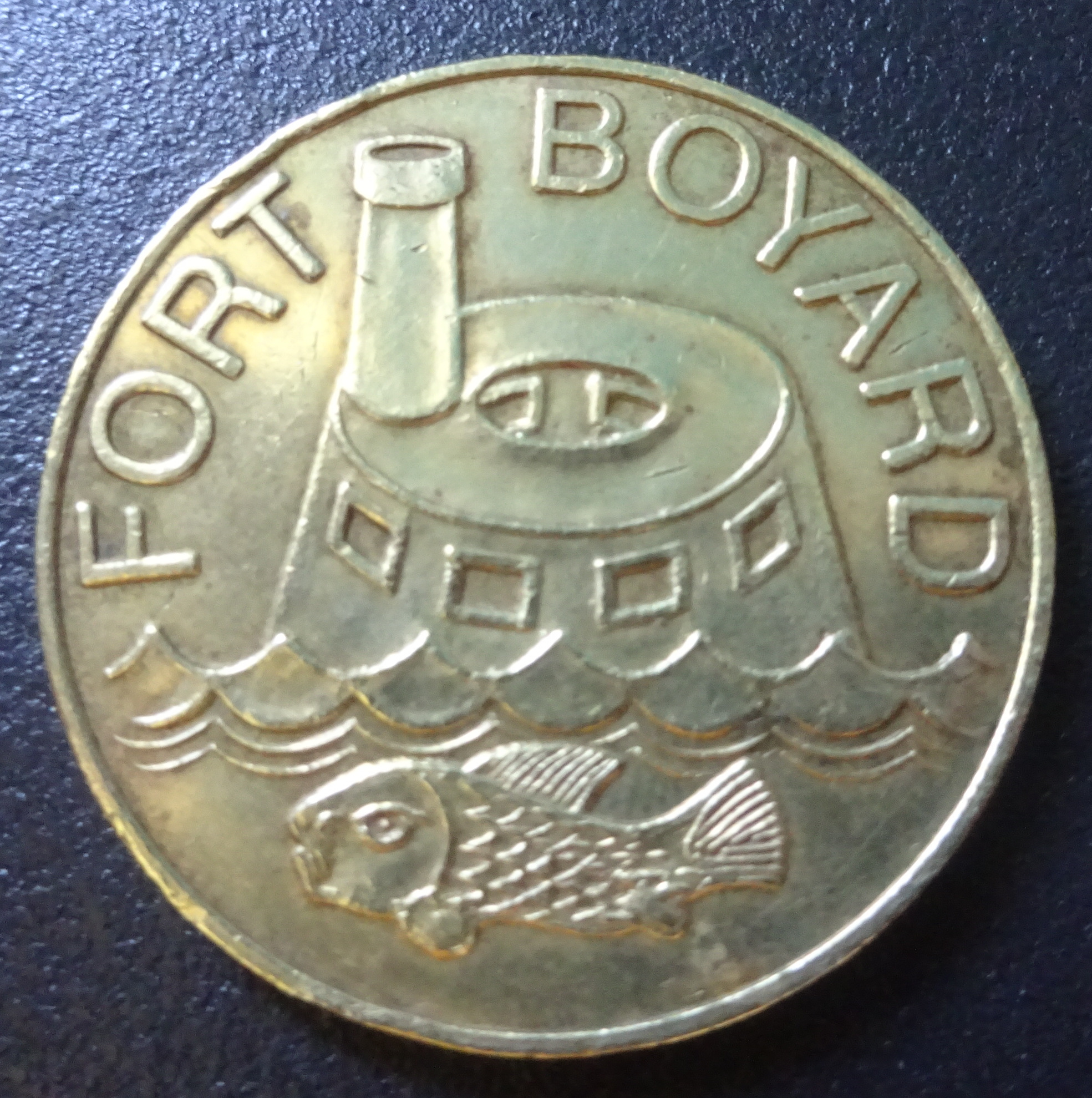
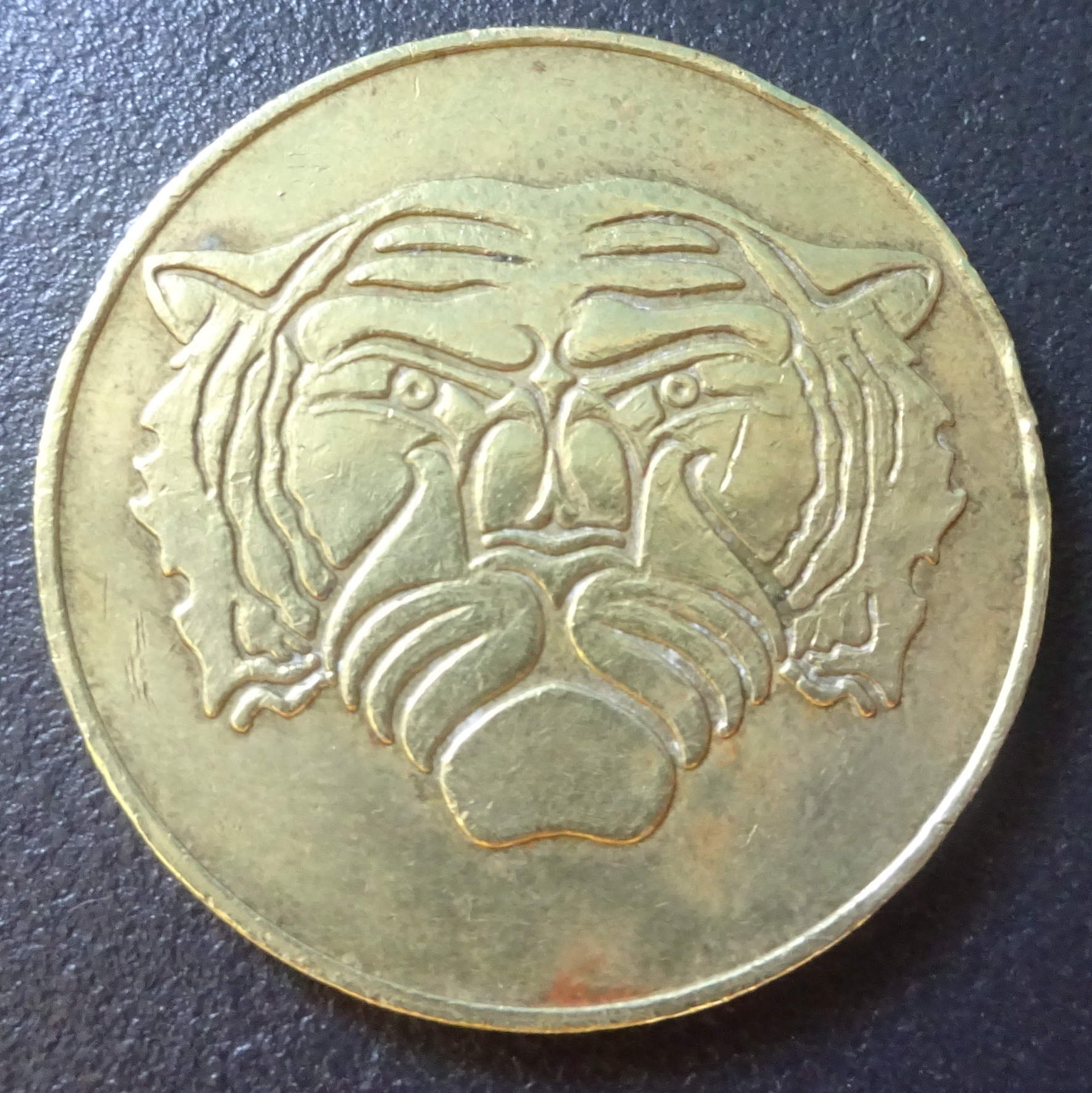
The boyar is the currency that participants must collect in the treasure room.

The Treasure Room (or Treasure Chamber in Ultimate Challenge) is the climax to each episode of Fort Boyard. The gold is stored here, which is guarded by the fort's tigers.

Once the Fort's gong sounds for a second time, the game time is over. When the gong is struck (by La Boule) the tigers are taken away by Monique, the gate to the Treasure Room rises and will only stay open for the time won in the Council Duels (1:30 minimum, or 4:00 maximum in the French version), 2:00 minutes in UK series 1 to 4 (the time stated did not include the 20 seconds before the gate started to rise) or 3:00 minutes in UK series 5. The 3 minutes includes 20 seconds before the gate started to rise (to open canisters/organise team). The gate takes 25 second to open and 20 second to close fully for every version of Fort Boyard worldwide.

As of 2016, in the French version, contestants who failed at the duels during the "judgment" sequence will have the chance to free themselves by making their way through an obstacle course within 2:30, with any time used in excess of 2:30 taken away from the three minutes the contestants have in the treasure room. This is then followed by extra games which are played to win extra time in the treasure room. Four or six members of the team each compete in a duel against the "Masters of Time". There is no risk of any time lost with 15 seconds earned for each successful duel, making a maximum possible time in the treasure room of four minutes.

If by this time the team has still not figured out the password from the clues won, they can "sacrifice" players in exchange for extra clues to help them. The sacrificed players have to grab the clue by putting their hand into one of the tiger-shaped hand traps around the Treasure Room entrance; once their hands are inside, they cannot release them and participate in collecting the gold.

The contestants then have to spell out the password on the giant alphabet on the floor of the treasure room by standing on the corresponding letters on the grid and using cannonballs if there are not enough players. The team must also ensure the word is spelled correctly, as a mistake could cost them the prize.

Once this is done, Monique/Felindra rotates the tiger's head (a statue), and the word will either be declared correct or incorrect, and the gold is released if the word is correct. Then the contestants have the remaining time to collect as much gold as they can and place it in a bucket outside of the treasure room. It is only what is in this bucket that they get to keep; any that lands on the floor is not counted. When the time is nearly up in the treasure room, a bell rings (in the UK version, in other versions the bell would have to be rung manually), and the gate begins to close slowly. The contestants have to leave before the gate shuts completely because when the door shuts the tigers are released back into the treasure room. (the release of the tigers is delayed until the contestants are out of the treasure room, a portcullis is pulled in some versions to block the tigers from being released). In the 1990 French version, and in the 2006 Russian version of the show, contestants were "locked" in the treasure room and the contestant had to use the exit underneath the gate. On the second occasion, the gold collected was lost as a result.

If, however, they declare an incorrect word, the gold is not released and instead the gate to the treasure room begins to close immediately, prompting the contestants to make a quick escape, and they complete the game with no winnings. The won gold is then weighed and converted into local currency; this makes the contestants' prize money. Their winning total was added to the "Leader Board", which was introduced in the second British series and displayed the five teams who collected the greatest amount of gold. The leader board was used to decide how much the team won as prize money, although this was not mentioned in the show.

In most countries, the money won by the team is given to a charity. Some countries, including UK, Spain, Argentina and Belgium, give the money directly to the members of the team while others give vacations instead of money, dependent on how much the team won. In France, between 1990 and 1992, the treasure was given to the team, but since 1993, the whole prize goes to charity. Then again in 2010, the prize money was given to the contestants.

In 1990, the rules are different as is the design of the treasure room. The original treasure room had a roof designed with wooden modules covered with stone decor like the other false walls in the fort. The team had to collect 18 keys during 18 tests, however no team manage to do this. These 18 keys allowed them enter and open the 18 chests located in the Treasure Room. Each key would only open a specific chest. At the end of the show, the contestants open the chests and discover inside each one, a random number of Boyars that they must collect. Succeeding in opening all the chests did not happen in the first French season. To enter the treasure room, contestants had to go through a flooded cavern, in the basement of the fort. After passing through a dark labyrinth, they enter the treasure room through the small skylight located under the main gate. This opening was only used that year, but it is still present today and has only been used on one further occasion. When the contestants have collected as many Boyars from the chests as possible, they must exit through the large revolving turnstile gate before it closes.

=== Summary of the UK rules ===
Series	Year(s)	Number of Keys required	Game Play	Treasure Room Time	Missing Keys	Extra Clues	Notes
1	1998	4 (1 free key after swim)	40 minutes	2:00 minutes	Dungeon (1 person per missing key)	Sacrifies (Tigers head outside Treasure Room)	Arrival on boat
2	1999–2000	4 (1 free key after swim)	40 minutes	2:00 minutes	Dungeon (1 person per missing key)	Sacrifies (Tigers head outside Treasure Room)	Arrival on boat + open gate to enter Fort (before the gong)
3	2000–2001	4 (1 free key after swim)	40 minutes	2:00 minutes	Dungeon (1 person per missing key)	Sacrifies (Tigers head outside Treasure Room)	Arrival on boat + open gate to enter Fort (before the gong)
4	2001	4 (1 free key after swim)	40 minutes	2:00 minutes	Dungeon (1 person per missing key)	Sacrifies (Tigers head outside Treasure Room)	Arrival onboard helicopter
5	2003	5 (no free key)	40 minutes	3:00 minutes	Dungeon (1 person per missing key)	Sacrifies (Tigers head outside Treasure Room)	Arrival on boat

Note: Opening titles show the original series' boat, and did not actually show the participants of the 2003 remake series arriving outside the Fort.

== Production ==
From a broadcasting perspective, Fort Boyard itself was refurbished during 1988–89 to become, essentially, a large outdoor television studio. The Fort has its own doctor, catering facilities, as well as production gallery and veterinary centre.

The Fort is equipped with 10 portable television cameras, one camera crane for overhead shots, one under-water camera as well as a number of smaller cameras which specifically cover individual games and challenges around the Fort.

The show was originally produced in the 4:3 aspect ratio, and changed to the 16:9 widescreen aspect ratio from 2008, and in HD since 2013.

== Variations to the format ==
In 1996, at the height of the French version's popularity, a mini-series entitled Fort Boyard at Night was shown in the autumn. It was filmed entirely at night, and the teams also had slightly more time in which to complete the challenges. In 1997, there were three night-time specials, at Halloween, Christmas, and New Year. In 2012, three further night-time editions were filmed and aired between Halloween (31 October) and Christmas (22 and 29 December).

In some of the French (Seasons 14–16, 2003–2005) and Russian versions (2003–2004), the contestants stay overnight in the Fortress. During this time, they played endurance, mind, and psychological games both for the release of any prisoners they may have had, and for keys to, or time in, the Treasure Room at the end of the game.

Although most seasons have seen changes (not least in hosts), recent changes to the French version of Fort Boyard included:

- From 2006 to 2009, the number of keys determined how much access the team had to the Treasure Room. 5 keys were the minimum needed to open the gate, but the gate would only open to a certain height, which made carrying coins through the gate difficult. A 6th key would open the gate roughly halfway, but it was still not easy to get through. To open the gate fully, 7 keys were needed. In 2006, when the host pulls the switch the Treasure Room gate would start to open immediately. If a team member did not get out of the Treasure Room in time, a portcullis was activated which stopped the tigers, but the money collected was lost forever.

=== The Council ===
- In the council, teams no longer play to free prisoners; rather, they play for up to 60 extra seconds of extra time in the Treasure Room, in addition to the three minutes guaranteed. From 1995 to 2011, there were a total of 31 different council games.

=== Hall of Imprints ===
- There was a new section in which one member donned a diving suit and dived down to the underwater control centre. There, he or she was guided by the team through an underground passage filled with traps and coded doors towards the "Hall of Imprints", freeing their prisoners along the way. Once all members (except the diver) had reached the Hall, they used their right hands to release the crystal, which they needed to enter the council.

=== 2007 season ===
- The Duels: They have extra games which are played to win extra time in The Treasure Room. Four members of the team play a game each against the Master of Darkness, if they won they got 15 seconds each, a total of 1 minute, of extra time in the Treasure room, making it a full 4 minutes.
- The Treasure Room: 2007 was the only season the time in the Treasure Room started after the opening of the gate. The team had 3:00 to 4:00 minutes in the gate. The team also had 15 seconds (if they had 7 keys) or 25 seconds (if they had 6 keys) and 35 seconds (if they had 5 keys) before the start of the time and the gate are opening; this made the time actually 3:15 to 4:35 minutes in total.

=== 2008 season ===
- In 2008, the diving section changed. All members except the diver entered the control centre. They had to put 9 coloured cubes in the correct order, using clues provided by the host. Once the 9 cubes are in place, the trap door for the diver opened. The diver entered a flooded room, with a treasure box, a drawing, and a maze with various coloured keys in it. He or she has had to describe the small drawing to the other team members. The drawing corresponds to a drawing on one of the 9 coloured cubes. The colour of the matching cube determined the key to retrieve from the maze. The team members had to guide the diver through the maze, as the diver only see it from behind. After the key had been freed, it was used to unchain the treasure box. The box was then lifted from the water, but couldn't be opened yet. The key to open it was inside the Treasure Room and would fall down together with the gold.

=== 2009 season ===
2009 saw many more changes. Main changes included new opening titles, graphics and a wall of progress which Demi (Passe Muraille) was in control of which lined the wall of the Fort (the wall above the Treasure Room). There were 6 new key games and 2 new clue games in 2009.

- One of the first major changes on the Fort was the before game challenge, called The Tube, which was only used this season. There was a large tube full of coloured water. The team had to find 2 black scratching posts, situated around the Fort, to find the numbers which was the combination to unlock the box containing the cup which was connected to the tube . If they could fill the cup with water before the tube ran out they got a bonus key game after the 45:00 minutes of key games had finished. This game was played in the central circle before the gong.
- Another change was that teams no longer stopped collecting keys at 7 keys but could continue on to collect up to 10 keys. These extra 3 keys were exchanged for clue words at the Treasure Room.
- Extra Games: The middle section of the game was also different. There were now 3 boxes which contained money. The problem was that 2 of them were sealed with glass. During this the prisoners would play Fear Factor style games in an attempt to win "pieces" to eliminate colours. The prisoners were released but if they did not win their games they were not allowed inside the Treasure Room.
- The Duels: Duels were different in 2009. The team could see what was happening through a window. The starting time was 3:00, but the team needed to bet on the duels with time. These times were 30, 20, 10, and −15 seconds. If they win on −15 seconds they did not lose any time. This made the minimum time in the Treasure Room 2:45, with the maximum being a full 4:00 minutes.
- The Treasure Room: The Treasure Room had changed in 2009. Firstly, the 6 key sign was raised to shoulder height. Secondly, teams couldn't trade clues for extra keys; they had to play with the keys they had. (If they got under 5 keys someone was sacrificed to Mr. Chan to gain a key.) In the Treasure Room they collected keys for boxes containing extra gold. They were allowed to pick only one box, at the end, and were allowed as many keys as there were people in the Treasure Room. Picking the correct box earned the team the extra gold.

=== Duel format ===
Since 2003, a duel/tournament format has been used by other countries, who prefer this version of Fort Boyard. Two teams play in the Fort at the same time, with only one of them winning at the end. A similar format was used in 1991.

In 2007 and 2008, a formula with duels between three countries (Bulgaria, Serbia and Turkey) was used; two countries (Belgium and Netherlands) in 1991 and with teams of teenagers in 2011 (United Kingdom and United States).

The 2024 Hungarian version uses a mixed format divided into two parts. Celebrities compete in teams, but only one person can win the game at the end of the week, so players are constantly eliminated. On the last day of the week, the competition turns into an individual competition and, at the end, one celebrity wins the amount collected during the five days, which they donate to charity.

Countries that have used this format include:

- Azerbaijan (2013–2014)
- Belgium (1991)
- Bulgaria (2007–2008)
- Canada (2013–2014)
- Denmark (2009–2010, 2019, 2021–2022)
- Finland (2010, 2012, 2018–2019)
- France (2010)
- Germany (2010)
- Greece (2006–2008)
- Hungary (2024)
- Morocco (2023)
- Netherlands (1991, 2011–2012, 2014)
- Norway (2010–2011, 2021–2022)
- Poland (2021–2022)
- Russia (2006, 2012)
- Serbia (2007–2008)
- Sweden (2003–2004, 2010–2017, 2019, 2022–2023)
- Turkey (2007–2008)
- United Kingdom (2011–2014)
- United States (1991 pilot, 2011)

==== French version ====
In 2010, the duel format was introduced to the show following the low ratings for the previous season in 2009. Although, this was not successful in the French version and was later dropped the same year. The show returned to a more classical version in 2011.

The changes made to the French version in 2010 were:

Main overview

- Passe-Temps and Mr. Chan left the show.
- Olivier Minne became the only host.
- Two teams competed to try to win the most keys in the first section.

Game Play

- 12 teams of 4 play 2 sections of the game. The Special team play only section 2 in game of episode 1 because all 4 members are former contestants in Fort Boyard.
- The team who won were called the "champion team" and would return the following week. Until the last episode, the Special team would play as the "normal team".
- Key games not only included the ones inside cells but also the clue games, which were played against a clepsydre. If the team lost a clue game they were made prisoner.
- There were 3 rounds of key games. Before each round there was a duel. Winning the duel not only won them a key, but also meant the other team had to win their game or their player was automatically made a prisoner.
- If there is no clear winner after the 3 rounds a new section of the show, Crossbow Relay, was introduced. Before this, the prisoners were released. All members had to complete a relay course for keys.
- The team with the lowest number of keys was sent off the Fort and a new team (champion team from last week) was sent back to compete against the current champions.
- The champion team from the last episode then faced the round 1 winners in clue games. These clue games can be key games with clue canisters, or clue games which were against the clepsydre.
- There were three rounds of clue games, with each round starting with a duel. Again the losing team was made prisoner if they did not win their clue game, but the winning team also got to choose which team got to play which game.
- After the clue rounds, any prisoners were released by the duels in the council room. 2/3 was required to win.

The Treasure Room

- At the Treasure Room, both teams used their clues and wrote down the codeword on a slate. Once this was put in place they had the remaining time of 3:30 (which included working out the code word). After 1 minute the gate started to open and began closes after 3:00 minutes (took 30 seconds to close fully). At around 0:15 seconds the slots were closed so the team couldn't insert any more money.
- The gold was then weighed and the codes were revealed. The team with the highest gold and correct codeword won.
- If both teams had the correct code, the team with the highest weight of gold won €10,000 and returned the following week.
- If both teams had the incorrect code, the champion team would return the following week, but did not win €10,000.
- The team which won the Grand Final (episode 7) would receive €50,000 prize (includes the €10,000 won previously).

=== 2010 German changes ===
- Most of the show's characters are gone.
- The Watch Tower and the riddles have been removed.
- The duel/tournament format was used.

=== 2011 French changes ===
Main overview

- Olivier Minne continues as the only host.
- Return to a more "classic" format, one team and seven keys required. (45 mins of key games, 25 mins for the adventures)
- Return of celebrities playing for charity.
- 3 new characters, including the return of the mud wrestler (Lady Boo).
- Father Fouras now chairs the council.

The Duels

- The team can see what is happening in the Council through a window. The starting time is 3:00, but the team must bet on the duels with this time. The times are 20, 15, 15 and 10 seconds. If they win on their choosing time it will be added to the 3:00 minutes, but if they lose it will be deducted. This makes the minimum time in the Treasure Room 2:00, with the maximum being a full 4:00.

The Hall of Judgement

This takes place after the key games. The Hall of Judgement provides opportunities for candidates to obtain the missing keys against the sacrifice of one of them but also to free the team members locked in during the first half. The challenges are set by new female character, the White Judge; played by Louise-Marie Hustings in 2011, then Raphaëlle Lenoble during 2012, and Delphine Wespiser since 2013 (who was a contestant at Halloween 2012). The challenges used are similar to those on The Cube and Minute to Win It.

- Each team member is free to be sacrificed to receive an extra key. The White Judge, sets a challenge the sacrifice/prisoner must complete to be released. If failed, they go directly into the terrible jails of La Boule until the end of the show; if they succeed, however, they are released and return to their team.

The Treasure Room

- When the host pulls the switch, the Treasure Room gate will start to open immediately. This was also done in 2006.
- The team have 12 seconds to process the password, instead of the normal 15 seconds.

=== 2011 UK changes ===
Main overview

- The show is now called Fort Boyard: Ultimate Challenge.
- Laura Hamilton and Andy Akinwolere, previously Geno Segers, present the new series.
- Teams are made-up of teenagers aged between 13 and 19 years old.
- The show's characters are gone and until series 4, the tigers were not used.
- The teams only collect keys and the Treasure Room section is changed.

=== 2012 French changes ===
- The Duels: The times are 20, 15 and 10 seconds. If they win on their choosing time it will be added to the 3:00 minutes, but if they lose it will be deducted. This makes the minimum time in the Treasure Room 2:15, with the maximum being 3:45 if all bets are won. The second duel is now a word puzzle rather than a contest with the Master of Shadows.

=== 2014 French changes ===
- The Duels: The times are 10 seconds for three games and 30 seconds for two games. If they win on their choosing time it will be added to the 3:00 minutes, but if they lose it will be deducted. This makes the minimum time in the Treasure Room 1:30, with the maximum being 4:30 if all bets are won. The prisoners will be released with 15 seconds deducted for each player.

=== 2015 French changes ===
- The Cage: A new area was added, called The Cage, and is hosted by the character Rouge, the twin sister of Blanche. This happens at the 25-minute mark in part 1. The team must sacrifice 1 key to enter The Cage, where three of the team members will compete in individual games against one of the Fort's guards, the guards were a team of former attendees chosen by Rouge. Each challenge completed successfully adds a key to the team's total, meaning if all 3 team members win their games, the net profit is 2 keys. Since 2016, teams are no longer required to sacrifice a key to enter The Cage.
- Prisoner Escape: Prisoners are now allowed to escape after Part 2, completing a course to get out of prison. The prisoner has 1:30 to escape, and any additional time taken is deducted from the team's starting 2:00 in the Treasure Room.
- The Duels: Duels no longer deduct from the team's Treasure Room time, they only add time depending on the team member's performance in the duel. This includes a new clock for Father Fouras' riddle, which is divided into three sections, 30, 20, and 10 seconds. Should the team member solve the riddle in time, the amount of time added is determined by the section the clock pointer is in, meaning the riddle is worth less time the longer it takes to solve it.

=== 2016 French changes ===
- The Duels: The duels return to the original head-to-head format with a candidate verses a tiger council master, 4 candidates get picked to play the duels, each duel challenged and completed adds 15 seconds to the timer, for a possible maximum time of 4 minutes on the clock, depending if the escape hasn't taken time away from the Treasure Room clock before hand.

=== 2018 French changes ===
- The Cage: The cage duels had changed from having a set of alumni, as part of a story shift, Rouge picked up some lost children and decided to make them into an elite squad just like the alumni beforehand. The same rules apply here, three duels to win three keys.

The episodes were also extended for the first time this year to include Fort Boyard: toujours plus fort! (Fort Boyard: always stronger!), a 50-minute show which features additional games and adventures played on the Fort alongside behind the scenes footage and interviews with the candidates from the episode broadcast just before. Minne and Rovelli host the show on the proscenium in front of the gate of the treasure room. On 25 May 2023, Minne announced that he would stop presenting this second part, he mentioned the fact of finishing at "improbable hours", explaining that the filming of an entire show can take from 10 to 11 hours during the day.

=== 2019 French changes ===
In 2019 as part of the 30th anniversary series, as part of a collaboration with the French company Monnaie de Paris, it had been announced that those taking part in each episode would be receiving a commemorative box of 6 Boyards no matter what happens to the team whether they win or lose.

=== 2020 French changes ===
As of 2020, COVID-19 had caused a few changes to the 2020 series of Fort Boyard. Some safety measures were in place to keep the candidates safe on the fortress which also changed the format of the series.

- The Team: As of the 2020 series, due to COVID-19 the amount of team members were reduced back to 5 members in the team. As part of the safety precautions, the team are based down in the bottom floor of the Fort within the treasure room entrance. Once entering the Fort, they wear facemasks and are spaced out equally at 1 meter apart. The command center for the adventures is all set in one safe area. They also mask up once inside the Treasure Room.
- Key Games and Adventures: Rather than the team being guided around the Fort, instead Passe-Partout would bring the players to the rooms and challenges while Passe-Muraille as usual would be Father Fouras's messenger boy passing scrolls to Olivier for each key game and adventure. Most two player games how now been reduced to one player games within the Fort to prevent COVID-19 spreading. For this series, the amount of keys have been reduced to 8 keys in the allotted time limit of 50 minutes.
- The Cage: This season, the cage does not bring back the lost children warriors, this time it features only three defenders for the game. Lady Boo, Little Boo and a replacement for Mr Boo, Big Boo. However the rules stay the same. Three rounds against the cage defenders to win a maximum of 3 keys, one for each round if completed successfully. Rather than the team going into the cage itself, the candidates chosen are brought there by Passe-Partout.
- The Escape: This season, before the escape, the team are given 3 minutes of time for the Treasure Room, if there are prisoners the escape has a time limit of 2:30. The candidates who get imprisoned must escape within that time. Once the initial time is over, the clock goes into overtime, in overtime it removes time from the Treasure room and will not stop until the candidates flip a switch to stop the clock once they have escaped.
- The Duels: The duels stay the same, 4 candidates take part in the duels to earn 15 seconds per duel win for a maximum of 4 minutes, however for safety concerns, it is broken down that two members of the team head into the tiger council at a time as they enter one by one afterwards for safety reasons.

=== 2021 French changes ===
- Willy Rovelli: As of the 2021 season of the show, Willy Rovelli had been captured by Pere Fouras after his Speakeasy bar had been found, as punishment he was placed inside the Fort Prison for his crimes. He usually will be inside the fort with the locked in teammates as he makes them do two events. WillyMation and Prison Canteen. In WillyMaton, the locked in players are to take on a small task. Taking a mug shot, however they must be perfectly still while distractions happen around them. If they fail to take a still photo three times the team member is locked in the prison for the adventures. For those locked in the prison, the team members then would take on the Prison Canteen, taking on the prison canteen the locked in team members must consume a food item to not only be freed but also to keep the treasure room time safe.

=== 2022 French changes ===
- The Tigers: This year saw the end of the Tigers being on the fort as they were replaced with models and CGI versions of the tigers.
- The Team: As of the 2022 series, the teams have returned to the maximum of 6 members on a team, with the team being able to travel around the fortress without the need for facemasks or social distancing.
- Key Games and Adventures: This year, as part of the changes, the series had been given a few format for the entire season. Each episode for the 2022 season Pere Fouras had set up a new stipulation system, ranging from a Night of Restrictions, or The Solo Adventure, which lasts throughout the night on the fort. The key games had been returned to a time limit of 45 minutes and with a key limit of 7 keys to collect.
- Judgement: For the judgement part of the show, the series has changed the feature so that now sisters Rouge and Blanche now share the power of judgement. With the cage now a part of the judgement it follows the same rules that if a player loses the cage judgement they are to be locked away.
- Willy Rovelli: As of the 2022 season of the show, Willy Rovelli completed his sentence as a prisoner, he was promoted as the sheriff of the Fort Prison by the Père Fouras.

=== 2024 French changes ===
- Cellules Interdites: This season, Pere Fouras along with the Tiger Council reopened a section of the fort called the Cellules Interdites, the premise would feature one member of the team sent down into the depths of the fortress to stay inside in order to set a difficultly for the key events. Ranging from a high security cell into a tavern filled with personalities. This replaced the cards system from the previous series.
- Passe-Partout & Passe-Muraille: Normally Passe-Partout and Passe-Muraille are given their usual jobs, with Partout guiding the team and Muraille being the quest giver, this season, Partout has been keeping a diary of information of all the events on the fort that the team are given by him ahead of specific events, on his shirt there is a key and a clue patch which either is removed to indicate what is awarded. However Muraille is given his own patch which makes him a competitor against a player in special circumstances, if the candidate fails against Muraille they lose out like normal. When he is in the challenge he removes a tiger emblem patch on his shirt.
- Willy Rovelli: In 2024, Willy Rovelli returned to his restaurant gimmick however has turned the restaurant into a high-profile restaurant where the food is fancier but still created with horrible ingredients. Same rules applied, candidates must consume what is given.
- Booster: A new addition to the team replacing the youngest character of Little Boo this season. He is a blonde haired man wearing a lightning motif theme.

=== 2025 French changes ===
- Les Origines: This series theme is the originals, mainly bringing back elements from the previous 35 series into the improved fort.
- Entry to the Fort: This series, the team are met with a video phone system to call Pere Fouras, once he answers he states to the team they will not be gaining instant access into the fort. Pere Fouras tells the team they have fifty minutes to gain seven keys for their way into the Salle du Tresór, instead of entering normally, the team will start the events by having to gain access to the watchtower to enter by climbing up the side of the fortress once the gong is rung. Once into the watchtower, the chosen climber from the team must answer the enigma to allow the fort to be opened.
- Pere Fouras: As part of the series, after having his previous boyards dwindling away, Pere Fouras has decided to take matters into his hands deciding to leave his inner sanctum and returning to his watchtower. He has also recruited new members and some classic members back to the fort.
- Willy Rovelli: For the 2025 season, Willy Rovelli's high-profile restaurant goes bust as Willy decides to open up a rustic French tavern instead. Same rules applied, candidates must consume what is given.
- Olivier Minne: After 23 consecutive seasons, this season would be the last for Minne as host of the French version. Minne has previous connections to the show; as the on-air continuity announcer when the first episode aired in 1990 and as a candidate in 1995. At the end of his final show, he receives a tribute from the production staff as well as from Father Fouras, the latter presenting him with the famous "tiger head" as a parting gift.
- Le Cercle des Anciens: For the 2025 season, a new secret society was founded and consisted of Pere Fouras, Maître du Temps, Felindra, Passe-Partout and Passe-Muraille have joined up to become the Cercle des Anciens, the society selects new or classic characters of the show to challenge contestants of the team. Depending of the episodes, the secret character challenges a contestant during a sacrifice to Blanche or Rouge's sanctums, or during the Collecte des clés (Épreuves) or Collecte des indices (Aventures).
- Cell Escape: This time those who are captured in an underground cell are given two minutes to smash up the cell and its contents to find a coloured key to escape the cell, going over takes time from the time needed in the Salle du Tresór.
- Salle Du Tresor: Same ruling applies however the starting time has been cut to 2:30 on the clock with a maximum of 3:15 available from the Maître du Temps section if perfect.

=== 2026 French changes ===
- Host Change: Cyril Féraud replaces Olivier Minne from this season following the departure of the latter.
- Temps Forts: During each episode, five specific challenges are proposed to the team with a possibility to earn a maximum of €10,000 (€2,000 each) if the challenge was done successfully. These special features can be individual or collective, one of these features includes a challenge with "Blanche" with a risk to lose a contestant if the challenge fails.
- First Escape: If some contestants are locked up during the Collecte des clés. They have an opportunity to rejoin the team, but are allowed only two minutes and thirty seconds to escape. If the prisonners fail to escape, they will try again after the sequence of the Collecte des indices (Adventures). In addition, if the team did not earn the seven keys, the sequence of the Sacrifice is play first.
- Sacrifice: If the team failed to earn the seven keys, one contestant is sacrificed per key. The number of sacrificed contestants depends of the remaining keys. In addition, The contestants don't have the right to sacrifice themselves, the system of the machine determines who is sacrificed instead. If the light is blue, the contestant is safe and continues the adventure with the team. However, if the light is red, a trap opens and sends the sacrificed contestant to the prisons until the end of the second sequence.
- Second Escape: For the contestants who failed to escape during the first attempt of the "Great Escape", sacrificed themselves to obtain the remaining keys or got lock up during the Adventures sequence, they can now try again with the same time limit. If the time allowed to escape exceeds, Big Boo or Passe-Partout locks the trapdoor and those who failed to escape are locked up until the end of the episode (as seen in the 2011 and 2012 seasons).
- Conseil: Each team is allowed two minutes for the Salle du Trésor. However, the team can win a maximum of one minute if they win their "duel" against Les Maîtres du Temps.
- Salle du Trésor: Each team can earn a maximum of €40,000 in Boyards inside the treasure room. A new feature in added in the Boyard fountain, as the clock runs down to 20 seconds rather than 30 seconds, the bell is rung by Cyril to alert the team and a ring of fire ignites around the fountain preventing any more Boyards from being extracted as the gate closes urging them to leave. The ring of fire also ignites if the password is wrong or if they don’t have enough time left before they must leave the treasure room.

== Music ==
The music for the original French version of Fort Boyard was composed by Paul Koulak, a French music composer. He composed the main themes for the show as well as the incidental music and game music that is used throughout the show. His music has been used for every version of Fort Boyard around the world, except the German version, where they composed their own music for the show and games.

Up to 2017, seven different opening theme songs have been used on the show; the first was used until 1994, the second in 1995, the third from 1996 to 2000, the fourth in 2001 and 2002 (used by the UK in 2003 during the Treasure Room), the "Dance Version" (used by France during the end credits of the night editions in 1996 and the UK from 1999 to 2001), the sixth theme song which was introduced in the 2003 French version and the seventh, introduced in 2016. Fort Boyard Ultimate Challenge uses a different opening theme and game music composed by Paul Farrer but does use the recent French opening credits and logo.

== Merchandise ==
=== CD releases ===
Some of the original music for Fort Boyard was released on CD in France, both on CD single and CD album form, in 1996 and again in July 1999 as Fort Boyard: La Musique de Toutes Les Aventures.

==== Single ====
"Fort Boyard"

Single by Paul Koulak
- Released: 1996
- Genre: Ambient; electronic; synth-pop; theme
- Length: 3:31
- Label: Bengal; Expand Music
- Producers: Expand Music; Magnetic Groove

All music is composed by Paul Koulak.

No.	Title	Producer(s)	Length
1.	"Générique Original"	Expand Music	3:31
2.	"Version Dream: Grand Piano Radio Edit"	Expand Music, Magnetic Groove	3:31
3.	"Version Dance: Time Hunters Mix" (Vocals by Carla Williams)	Expand Music, Magnetic Groove	3:15
Total length:			10:27

==== Album ====
Fort Boyard: La Musique de Toutes Les Aventures

Soundtrack album by Paul Koulak
- Released: 13 July 1999
- Genres: Soundtrack; ambient; electronic; synth-pop; theme
- Length: 1:07:54
- Labels: La Tribu; Expand Music; Peace Productions
- Producer: Paul Koulak

All music is composed by Koulak, except where noted.

No.	Title	Writer(s)	Producer(s)	Length
1.	"Les clès de Fort Boyard (Générique)"		Expand Music	2:08
2.	"L’homme de la tour"			2:30
3.	"Course d’un point a un autre"			1:08
4.	"Boyardesque"			2:52
5.	"Natationisimo"			1:26
6.	"Le Trapèze"			3:54
7.	"Timbalissimo"			1:36
8.	"Prédudissimo"			2:00
9.	"Saute arène"			2:49
10.	"Marche des tigres"			3:10
11.	"Parcours flou"			3:02
12.	"Les serpents"			3:00
13.	"Le pirate"			0:45
14.	"Surplombissimo"			4:36
15.	"Inutilissimo"			3:39
16.	"Ratman"			2:19
17.	"Variation N°1"			2:16
18.	"Pigeonissimo"			0:59
19.	"Guitare gitane"			0:24
20.	"La bohémienne"			3:16
21.	"Cablocypède"			4:35
22.	"Le surplomb"			3:20
23.	"Monte Filet"			1:57
24.	"Appetissimo"			5:33
25.	"Le rap du fort" (feat. Virus 19)	A. André-Pillois, T. Tabet		3:23
Total length:				67:41

=== Comic adaptations ===
Fred Burton created a comic book adaptation of the French-language edition of the show, published by Éditions Jungle.

=== Video games ===
Fort Boyard: Le Défi is a PC CD-ROM game based on the television show and released in 1995. It provides the player the possibility to become a team member, playing the well known game in the Fort. The game was created by Microids, France Televisions and R&P Electronic Media. The game was available in French and Dutch.

Fort Boyard: La Legende is an action adventure game, based in and around La Rochelle and on Fort Boyard. It was released in 1996 by Expand Images, Microïds, France Télévisions, and R&P Electronic Media. It was only released in the original French version (as a tie-in to the game show) and the later Dutch-spoken versions. The lack of an English version made this game highly obscure: it does not have a MobyGames entry. The hero of this game has no name; he is going to look for a treasure that was hidden by Napoleon at Fort Boyard. For this he needs to look around for clues, and get people to help, in and around La Rochelle.

=== 30th anniversary coin ===
As part of the 30th anniversary, Monnaie du Paris, a French coin maker had collaborated with the French game show to create a run of the “30 Ans” commemorative coins based on the actual Boyard coins used in the show, with the front having the words “Fort Boyard” on the outside, with an image of the fort in the centre and a fish under it, while on the back it features the tiger head with the term “30 Ans” (30 Years) over the head with the emblem of Monnaie du Paris underneath.
