= Willy Rovelli =

French actor (born 1973)

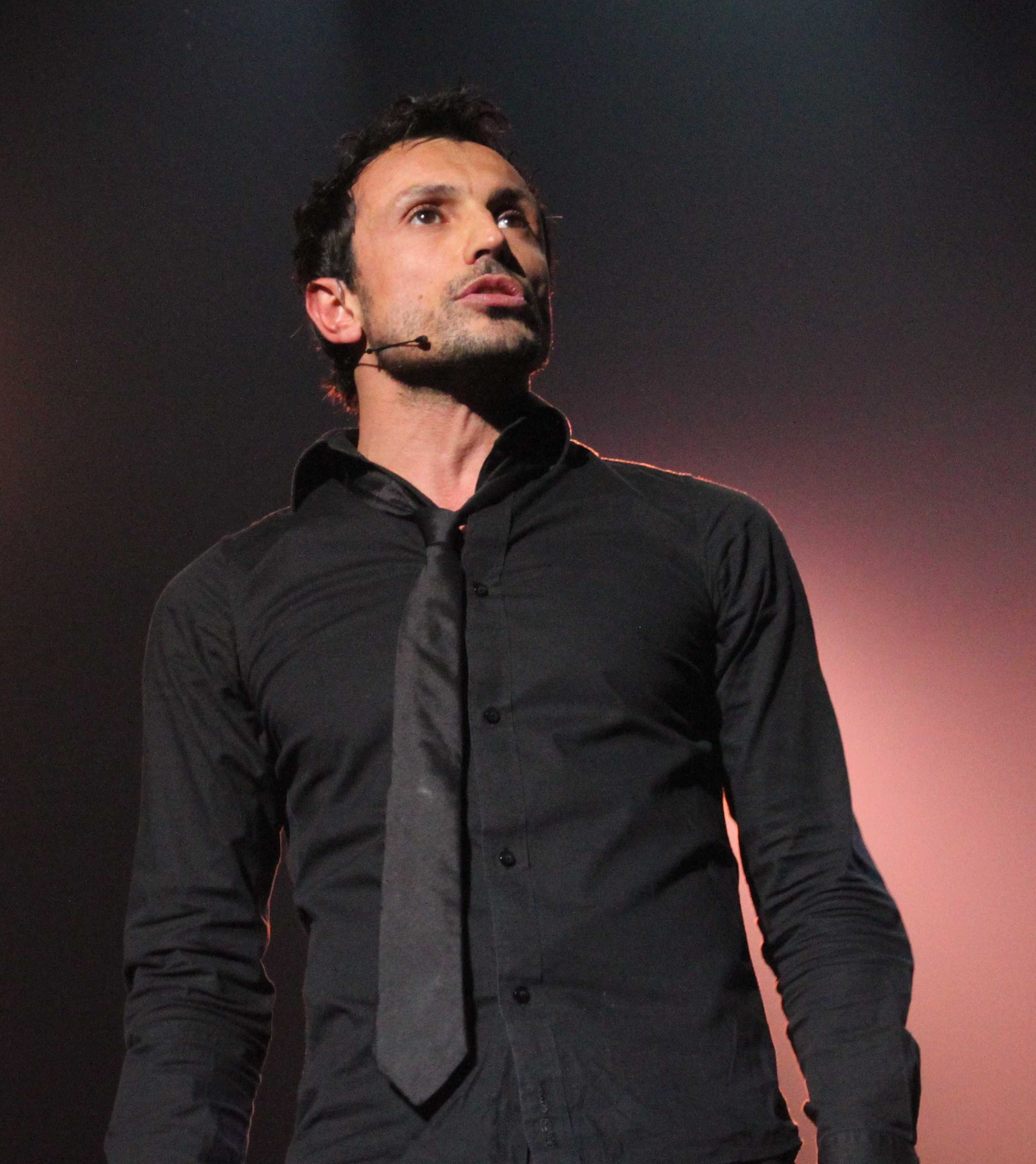
- Willy Rovelli at the Bataclan Theater in 2012
- Born: William Rovelli; 18 August 1973 (age 52); Cluses, Haute-Savoie, France
- Occupation: Actor, comedian, writer, columnist, television personality
- Years active: 2005–present

William "Willy" Rovelli (born 18 August 1973) is a French actor, writer, columnist, comedian, and television personality. He is the daily radio host on the French station France Bleu and plays the famous chef character on the French television game show Fort Boyard.

== Early life ==
Rovelli was born on 18 August 1973 in Cluses, Haute-Savoie and spent his childhood in Annecy. When he was 17, he moved to Paris.
