= VTV (Belarusian TV channel) =

TV channel in Belarus (founded 2002)

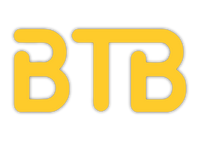
- Logo used from 2023 until 2024
- Country: Belarus
- Broadcast area: Belarus
- Headquarters: Minsk, Belarus

Programming
- Language: Belarusian
- Picture format: 576i (4:3 SDTV)

History
- Launched: 1 March 2002; 24 years ago
- Closed: 18 June 2024

Links
- Website: vtv-media.by

VTV (formerly First Musical) (stylised as BTB) was a Belarusian entertainment channel. It appeared as a result of the rebranding of the popular TV channel "First music." The TV channel "VTV" instituted Belarusian company "Dobrovidenie." The channel broadcast TV series, sketch shows, humorous and informative programs, movies and music videos in the night / morning air. In recent years, most of the channel's content has been provided by CTC Media. Target audience VTV is aged 10 to 45 years old. The terms of viewers of TV channel 60% of the female audience, 40% of men. According to the latest when the Media Research television channel VTV share reached 6.3% VTV is the largest private television channel in Belarus. It is represented in 100 per cent of cable operators in Minsk and 98 percent of the country's cable operators. Satellite broadcasting is provided by satellite.

== Milestones ==
- 1 March 2002 - The Belarusian company "Dobrovidenie" announced the beginning of broadcasting a new television channel called "The first music channel." For the first time in the territory of Belarus was the channel, fully oriented to an audience of 16 to 35 years and aimed at promoting the modern Russian youth culture.
- February 19, 2004 - The first music channel for the first time in the history of the Belarusian television switched to 100% interactive broadcasting. Viewers of the channel was open the possibility of real-time post greetings, dating, commercial advertisements, etc. As a "ticker", as well as participate in the vote, thus creating a list of videos to be shown on the "First musical."
- August 26, 2004 - The first music channel switched to satellite broadcasting using satellite "Express-AM22", thus becoming the first Belarusian satellite interactive TV channel.
- November 23, 2009 and the channel because of the global trend of decreasing interest in music television has changed the format to include broadcast programs soap operas and comedy programs, mainly the production of the channel STS.
- The January 2010 and held a rebranding channel, resulting in changed the name of the "First musical channel" on VTV. At this time, the number of channel increases broadcast PFI software. Live begin to emerge serials of foreign production, and from April 5 as feature films. These changes helped increase the rating of the channel VTV in comparison with the first musical 4 times.
- Summer 2011 TV channel VTV announced a "summer of television prime". On June 20, 2011, the channel was launched 15 new show for the Belarusian audience of projects have already been successfully held in Russia on STS channel. Among them: the series Voronin and The Kremlin Cadets, the sketch comedy Give Youth!, the comedies Ural Dumplings and Good Jokes, the improvisational show Thank God You Came!, and the educational programs I Want to Believe! and History of Russian Showbusiness.
- From January 28 program CTC International CTC marked with a joint logo and the PFI, which is a prerequisite for granting rights to content in 2012-2013 and one of the conditions of the contract with the copyright holder.
- In February 2014 the line of the TV channel "VTV" appeared daily show feature films.
- September 8, 2014 on the TV channel "VTV" launched a new television season under the slogan of "seasonal renewal." In addition to the launch of new television projects, the channel presented a new logo.
