= Brown Morning =

1998 book by Franck Pavloff

- Author: Franck Pavloff
- Language: French
- Genre: Fable
- Published: December 1998
- Media type: Print (hardback & paperback)

Brown Morning (French: Matin Brun) is a French fable, written by Franck Pavloff in 1998, published by editions Cheyne, a publishing house usually specialized in poetry.

The title of the fable refers to the "Brown Shirts" nickname given to Nazi SA militia. The author wrote this short story in a "fit of anger" after the revelation of candidates alliances with the National Front in the second round of a set of local elections.

Brown Morning is a universal story that takes a stand against the pensée unique and what Pavloff called "small compromissions". This book aims for a universal appeal by leaving out any details on when or where it takes place. The book became an overnight success in 2002 (more than a million copies sold) after the surprise result of the first round of that year's presidential election in which the far-right candidate Jean-Marie Le Pen qualified unexpectedly for the second round. Since then, this short story is regularly studied and discussed in French schools.

== Summary ==
The State Brun, fictitious political organization, prohibits the possession of dogs or cats which are not brown, ostensibly for scientific reasons. The protagonists of the story, not feeling that it will affect them, find reasons to approve this law. However, a new decree requires the arrest of all those who have owned such an animal in the past, as well as their families and friends.

== Similarities ==
Its theme and progression of its plot are similar to those of Habe ich geschwiegen a poem using anaphora, written in the Dachau concentration camp by Pastor Martin Niemöller.

The theme of Brown Morning is also very close to that developed by the playwright Eugène Ionesco in his play Rhinocéros.

== Adaptations ==
Vincent Josse produced a CD-book edited by Night in 2002, played by Jacques Bonnaffé and Denis Podalydès, with music by Christian Zanési (from affected areas) and Bruno Letort (from electronic Fables) and cover illustrated by Enki Bilal.

The director Serge Avedikian adapted Brown Morning for his animated short one morning. Shot in 35 mm and released in 2005, this film is made from paintings Solweig Von Kleist, a German painter living in Paris. He has traveled the world in more than 40 festivals, won numerous awards and is being studied as part of the initiative College at Cinema in France. The Arte channel, co-producer of the film, was broadcast several times.

The composer Bruno Giner wrote in the book pocket opera called Charlie and performed by the Ensemble Aleph, published in CD-book form by the collection "Signatures" of Radio France in 2007 with coverage of Enki Bilal.

Psysalia Psysalis Psyche, group of Japanese post-rock, achieved in 2009 its first album named Brown Morning in reference to the literary work. This album is a nod to an illustrated version of the new Franck Pavloff.

Hong Kong cartoonist Ah To adapted Brown Morning into a comic book about Hong Kong's political situation in 2015.
