= Death of Thomas Perotto =

2023 fatal knife attack in France

- Crépol (Auvergne-Rhône-Alpes) Crépol (France)
- Location: 45.1743°N 5.0718°E; Crépol Village Hall, Crépol, Drôme, France
- Date: 19 November 2023 at 1:30 am (UTC+01:00)
- Weapon: Knives
- Deaths: 1 (Thomas Perotto)
- Injuries: 16 (2 seriously)
- Accused: 7 adults, 3 minors

On 19 November 2023, Thomas Perotto (age 16) was fatally stabbed in a violent attack that took place in Crépol, in the Drôme department of southeastern France. During the incident, two other victims (aged 23 and 28) were seriously injured and placed in emergency care, while fourteen other people suffered minor injuries. The attack followed an earlier altercation at the village ball involving a group of individuals from neighbouring Romans-sur-Isère. An investigation into "homicide and attempted homicide in an organised gang" was opened; in the days that followed nine people were arrested in Toulouse and Romans-sur-Isère on suspicion of being the perpetrators.

The attack received national media and political attention, with President Emmanuel Macron and the government responding to statements made by political opponents, as well as paying tribute to Perotto at the National Assembly. It caused a media frenzy and multiple far-right rallies, after several witnesses reported hearing anti-white remarks from the attackers. In July 2026, the examining magistrates (juges d'instruction) retained the aggravating circumstance of remarks targeting the "white race and the French nation" against the prosecutor's initial recommendation.

== Events ==
The festival committee of Crépol, a village in the Drôme department with a population of about 500, organizes an annual "winter ball" attended by many people from the surrounding area. Nearly 400 people took part in the festivities scheduled for Saturday, November 18, 2023.

=== Victims ===
Born on 6 December 2006 in Romans-sur-Isère, Thomas Perotto was accompanied by one of his older brothers for the evening. Perotto was stabbed in the heart and throat by a knife. Taken care of by the fire department and medically treated in Romans, he was airlifted to Lyon, but died during the transfer. He was a member of the RC Romanais Péageois XV rugby team and attended the Lycée du Dauphiné in Romans-sur-Isère.

Nine victims were stabbed with knives. Two people, aged 23 and 28, were treated as absolute emergencies, while six suffered minor injuries. Eight other people were treated by the fire department in a state of shock.

== Investigation ==
=== Initial account ===
According to the initial account, which was called into question by the Grenoble gendarmes' investigation and by testimonies in the press, at around 1:30 am, a group of around ten individuals made their way to the ball, just as the evening was drawing to a close and the participants were leaving the village hall. The individuals were refused entry by a security guard because they had not registered for the evening. After searching them, the security guard noticed that the individuals were carrying knives "20 to 25 centimeters long"; the situation escalated and he was wounded in the hand. Several witnesses reported that the attackers yelled "We're here to kill the whites!" Those armed with knives attacked guests, stabbing them, while others threw projectiles such as stones or fences. Once the attack had been committed, the assailants left the scene before help arrived.

The case was handed over to the Valence public prosecutor's office, led by Laurent de Caigny, who spoke of a "planned expedition" by the perpetrators. The Valence public prosecutor's decision to classify the murders and attempted murders as part of an organized gang meant that police custody was extended for up to 96 hours. Investigations were carried out by the Grenoble Research Unit.

=== Arrests and charges ===
Three days after the event, on the outskirts of Toulouse, the GIGN and the Toulouse Observation and Surveillance Group arrested seven people, including three minors, as they fled their homes. At the same time, two other people were arrested in Romans. All nine were natives of Romans, with the exception of one from Italy. On the same Thursday, 23 November 2023, five searches in connection with the case took place in the Monnaie district of Romans, known for its problems of delinquency and insecurity, against a backdrop of drug trafficking.

The main suspect, Chaïd A., suspected of being the perpetrator of the fatal stabbing, had left his residence in downtown Romans, his hometown, following the incident. He had previously been convicted of handling stolen goods and fined for "carrying a category D stabbing or incapacitating weapon without legitimate reason", with a "two-year ban on holding or carrying a weapon", which was served on him on 25 September 2023. However, his direct involvement in the death is in doubt: the witness who had identified him from a photograph did not recognize him during a line-up, and other clues and testimonies pointed investigators towards another individual. According to some media reports, the people arrested in Toulouse were planning to flee to North Africa via Spain.

In the days that followed, even after the suspects had been taken into custody, the Valence public prosecutor's office, the only one authorized to communicate on the case, kept the names of the assailants under wraps, apparently due to the ongoing investigation. The first name of one of the main suspects, Chaïd, was published online by a national daily newspaper, Le Figaro, during the period of police custody, followed by the first names of those over the age of majority in police custody. (Note: Ilyes, Chaïd, Yasir, Mathys, Fayçal, Kouider and Yanis)

=== Reassessment of the initial account ===
The initial police interviews of the suspects and new testimonies provided a more complex picture of the initial account and departed from the description of a coordinated group performing a planned attack. By 25 November, French police investigators had gathered more than a hundred eyewitness accounts. An investigation based on elements of the Grenoble gendarmes investigation was posted on the website of Le Parisien on the evening of 4 December and published in its print edition on 5 December 2023, doubting the idea of a deliberate attack, and leaning more towards a fight that escalated, against a background of prior tensions between individuals who had spent an evening together.

Some of the individuals originally presented as the assailants were actually already present at the party. A rugby player friend of Perotto allegedly provoked one of them by pulling his hair and calling him "Tchikita" (in reference to a song by the singer Jul), sparking a fight between the two of them that later escalated into wider violence. Anti-white comments were heard by witnesses, several of whom heard assailants say they wanted to "kill white people", as well as an anti-North African remark made by the young rugby player from Crépol believed to have instigated the altercation, who, according to a friend's testimony, said that he "wanted to beat up bougnoules".

On 6 December, the lawyer for four of the suspects explained that the context of the brawl was too chaotic to understand the course of events, with "50 people fighting, in semi-darkness". He describes how one of his clients was beaten up by four people before the situation completely degenerated and was not carrying a knife.

=== Aggravating circumstance of racism ===
On July 23 2026, following submissions from civil parties, including the far-right organisation AGRIF, and witness statements reporting anti-white remarks, the examining magistrates added the aggravating circumstance of an attack "targeting the white race and the French nation". Despite the public prosecutor's office contesting this qualification in August 2026 due to imprecise and contradictory testimonies, the magistrates ultimately upheld the racist aggravating circumstance in September 2026.

== Aftermath and reactions ==
=== March and funeral for Thomas Perotto ===
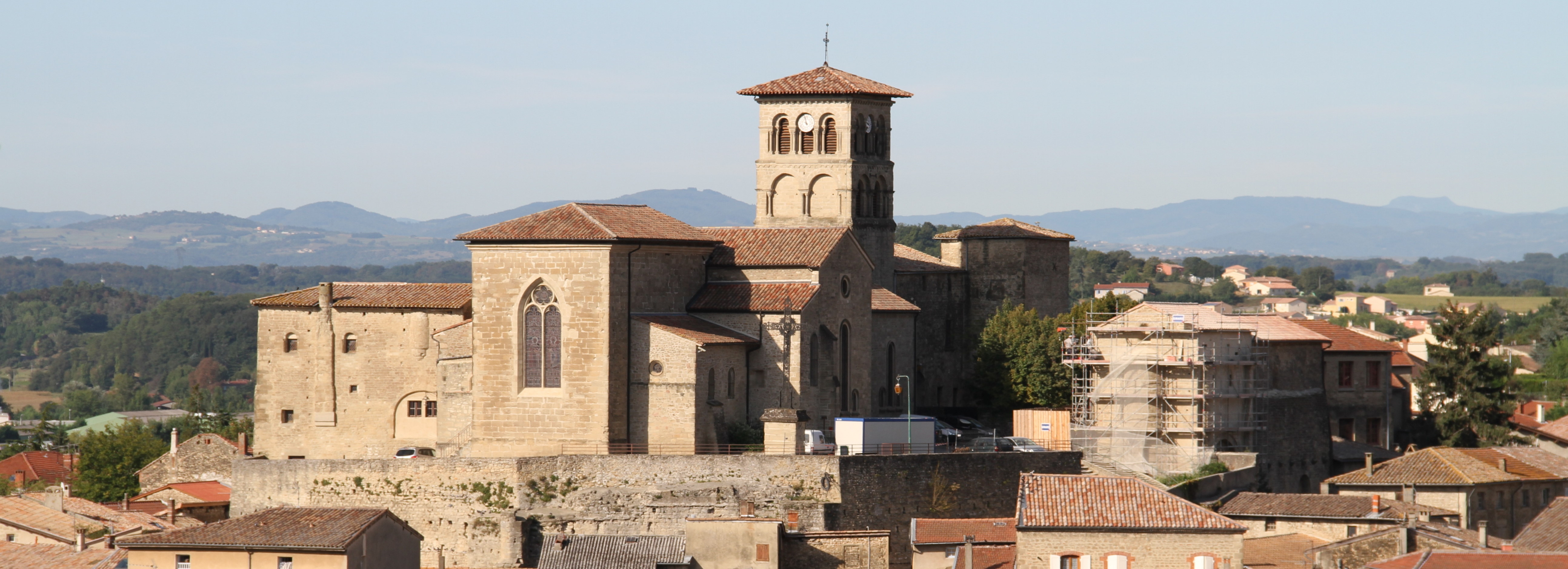
Thomas Perotto's funeral took place on Friday, 24 November 2023, at the collegiate church of Saint-Donat-sur-l'Herbasse.

On Wednesday, 22 November 2023, a march gathered more than 6,000 people in the streets of Romans, in tribute to Perotto, with the presence of his family and loved ones, including friends from the high school. Many of Perotto's teammates from his XV rugby club, RC Romanais-Péageois, were also present, as well as students from the Lycée du Dauphiné, where the victim attended school. At 2pm on Monday, 20 November, a minute's silence was observed at the school. Philippe Saint-André, former coach of the French rugby union team Philippe Saint-André, himself a native of Romans, who played for the same club and took part in the same ball at the same age as Thomas Perotto, expressed his sorrow, denouncing an "increasingly violent world ... [where] education has been forgotten". France team captain Antoine Dupont and one of the team's leaders Grégory Alldritt honor Thomas Perotto's memory by sharing an Instagram post from RC Romans-Péage. The President of the French Rugby Federation, Florian Grill, said "It is all of rugby which is in mourning and which salutes Thomas at the same time as the whole nation. More than ever, the values of respect and fraternity that rugby embodies are essential to society. Thomas embodies them more than ever", and it was decided that a minute's silence in memory of Thomas Perotto would precede all French rugby union matches taking place over the weekend of 25 to 29 October.

Perotto's mother expressed her distress in Paris Match magazine on 21 November and hoped that the investigation would identify all the perpetrators, saying "Who comes to a party with knives? They wanted to fight. I hope the gendarmes will quickly find out who did it. It won't bring him back, but at least it'll stop them from doing any more... murders. Yes, it's a murder they've committed".

On the evening of Thursday, 23 November, the Crépol parish organized a vigil with the agreement of the Perotto family, where 400 people gathered with prayers and songs. Sheets of paper were laid out for participants to write a note. Thomas Perotto's funeral is held on Friday, November 24, 2023 at the Saint-Pierre-et-Saint-Paul collegiate church in Saint-Donat-sur-l'Herbasse, with outdoor speakers installed to broadcast the ceremony. The family's tribute is read out by his grandfather in front of almost 2,000 people: in his message, he expects a firm verdict from the courts against the perpetrators, a "gang of hooligans with a knife for a heart", thanks the police for having quickly found the perpetrators, and pays tribute to the memory of his late grandson.

=== Political response ===
Local politicians were quick to react. The mayor of Crépol, Martine Lagut, declared: "I feel depressed, because it's not normal for things like this to happen in our small rural villages. It's a tragedy we're living through, and our village is very much affected by this event. It's gratuitous violence, it was very brutal and very violent". On 29 November, she stated that the victims' families were "asking that the racist nature of the attack be retained".

The mayor of Valence, Nicolas Daragon, stated he hoped that "the attackers, whoever they are, wherever they are, will be found quickly, put out of action and handed over to the courts, whose decision I expect to be as severe as it is exemplary".

The mayor of Romans-sur-Isère, Marie-Hélène Thoraval, believed that the murder was "racist" in nature. She blames what she considers to be a "culture" of delinquency in the Monnaie district of her town, and accuses the suspects' parents of having passed it on to them. Called a "fascist", she was subsequently placed under police protection after receiving several death threats by decapitation, which led her to lodge a complaint. Residents of the Monnaie district who felt stigmatized by the mayor's remarks demonstrated against her on December 2, 2023, despite a ban issued by the prefecture.

At the beginning of 2024, Thoraval received yet another death threat because of her stance following Thomas' death. One of the individuals who had threatened her was sentenced in December to eight months' imprisonment for "outrages by word or threat", while another who had threatened her with decapitation was remanded in custody.

French President Emmanuel Macron spoke of a "terrible assassination" and an "aggression that has marked us all", speaking on the subject at a conference of mayors at the Élysée Palace.

Some denounced the attack as a "raid" carried out by "an armed militia" (Marine Le Pen), a "francocide" (Éric Zemmour), and denounced the perpetrators as "scum", a term echoed by the president of the Republicans party, Éric Ciotti, who called for "implacable justice". Bruno Retailleau, also of The Republicans party, advocates a "judicial revolution" to punish the perpetrators. Gérald Darmanin, the French Minister of the Interior, called for a "general collapse of our society" and evoking a turning point in "ensauvagement". On 27 November 2023, government spokesman Olivier Véran, at the suggestion of the mayor of Crépol, went to meet elected representatives, firefighters, police officers and residents to discuss the matter and "tell them that we are at their side", adding that he hoped for "very heavy sentences". Interior Minister Gérald Darmanin said those denying the existence of anti-white racism are "blind", or choosing "not to see it". Senate Majority Leader Bruno Retailleau went further, stating: "We must also get to the root of the evil, that is to say immigration", pointing towards the suspects' cultural backgrounds.

On the left, Communist Party national secretary Fabien Roussel stated he deplored "a society where acts of this type are happening more and more" and France insoumise deputy François Ruffin denounced "gratuitous, unbridled, cruel violence", while Finance Committee chairman and France insoumise representative Éric Coquerel refused to talk of ensauvagement and said this type of brawl was not worsening.

On 28 November 2023, the French National Assembly observed a minute's silence for Perotto. The President of the National Assembly, Yaël Braun-Pivet, stated that "an outburst of violence has plunged a French commune into horror [following the] tragedy that mourns and shocks our entire country" and calls for "justice to be done, and justice is neither vengeance nor vindictiveness". The French Prime Minister, Elisabeth Borne, offered her condolences, alerted her Interior and Justice Ministers to take a hard line with the perpetrators, and declared that "we have a duty of unity, a duty of dignity, without minimizing the facts (...), without political recuperation, without stirring up hatred", condemning the ultra-right groups, whom she concluded with "we won't let anything get past us".

=== Far-right rallies ===
==== First days after death ====
Right-wing extremists were quick to highlight the suspects' origins. At the initiative of identitarian groups including Remparts de Lyon, a rally was planned in Palais de justice historique de Lyon on the same day, Wednesday, 22 November, in parallel with the white march taking place in Romans-sur-Isère. This was banned by the Rhône prefecture, citing "attempts at recuperation, provocation of hatred and violent confrontation".

On 24 November in Reims, an unauthorized demonstration involving around 50 people took place in front of the cathedral, where neo-Nazi demonstrators could be heard shouting "Justice for Thomas" and "France is ours". The neo-Nazi hooligan group MesOs Reims is suspected of being behind the organization of this demonstration.

==== 25 November Monnaie unrest ====
On 25 November, a group of around 80 members of extreme right-wing, identitarian and neo-Nazi groups, some of them hooded and armed with iron bars, went to the Monnaie district of Romans-sur-Isère to carry out a punitive expedition, as attested by discussions found on some of their phones by local residents. They shouted racist and Islamophobic abuse, and some went on the rampage. Some were repelled by the police and others by local residents (including Maxime Lemaignent). Slogans such as "Islam out of Europe" and "The street, France, belongs to us" [sic] were chanted. They threw stones and fired fireworks in the direction of the police, who made 20 arrests. Six of them were brought to trial immediately, and received prison sentences ranging from six to ten months.

Several of those arrested came from the neo-Nazi groups Division Martel, Vandal Besak and L'Oriflamme, but most came from various entities that succeeded Génération identitaire, notably Argos. None of those arrested came from the Drôme region. Some of these reportedly had lists containing the personal details of the eight murder suspects, as well as the first names and surnames of their family members. The list allegedly was leaked by certain elements of the police force. One of the identity activists, aged 20, was attacked by young people in the Monnaie district. Local residents protect him. He was nevertheless injured and hospitalized.

The man suspected of coordinating this operation is a certain "Gros Lardon", an alias of Léo Rivière-Prost. Prost, a former soldier, who left the army for political reasons, is based in Rouen and militates within Division Martel. Telegram exchanges received on protesters' phones indeed mention this pseudonym as the group's leader.

==== After 25 November ====
In Cherbourg, the inscription "Justice pour Thomas, ici on est en France" ("Justice for Thomas, here we are in France") was spray-painted on the mosque, while the Valence mosque received a threatening letter stating "A good Muslim is a dead Muslim. Justice for Thomas", accompanied by a cartoon of a nude Mohammed from Charlie Hebdo. Other demonstrations by nationalist militants took place in the days that followed: on November 26 in Rennes, attended by the violent neo-Nazi group L'Oriflamme Rennes, and on November 27 in Lyon, where around a hundred masked individuals shouted racist and Islamophobic slogans. In response, on November 28 Gérald Darmanin proposed the dissolution of three far-right groups, including Division Martel.

Between 27 November and 1 December, several people of North African origin were attacked in Romans-sur-Isère. On the evening of 1 December, a demonstration organized by the identitarian movement Les Natifs, initially banned but then authorized at the last minute, brought together around 200 people in Paris at the Place du Panthéon. Several demonstrators, many of them hooded, performed Nazi salutes, and chanted anti-immigration slogans ("La racaille en prison, clandestins dans l'avion").

Several other calls for demonstrations were issued throughout France in December, some with purported racist slogans. Often forbidden, the multiplication of these demonstrations was part of a strategy by the leader of L'Alvarium to outflank the authorities and demonstrate the ostensible authoritarian nature of the Macron regime.

==== Revelations by Le Canard enchaîné ====
On 6 December, Le Canard enchaîné revealed that the national center for combating online hate had opened an investigation against X following the leaking of contact details for young people in the La Monnaie district of Romans-sur-Isère. This leak led to hate messages and calls for violence on social networks, which in turn led to unrest in the neighborhood on November 25. The Valence public prosecutor's office suspects that police officers were behind the data leaks.

=== Media impact ===
Perotto's death and its consequences went beyond local media coverage, via Le Dauphiné Libéré, the daily newspaper of reference in the Drôme region, since the case was featured on the front pages of Libération (November 27, 28 and 29, 2023), Le Monde (November 23 and 28, 2023) and Le Figaro (November 21, 22, 23, 24 and 25, 2023).

This led to numerous editorials and articles denouncing "ultraright" political movements and also positing that the entire matter reflected a "societal fact" not merely a "news item". The 24-hour news channels BFMTV and CNews were accused of taking advantage of the affair to promote an extreme right-wing narrative.

On 27 November, Patrick Cohen talked about the Crépol tragedy on the C à vous program, explaining that the young people from Romans were there to "have fun" and "pick up girls", thus qualifying the initial version of the affair. The media reaction was extremely strong, particularly on social networks, where he was criticized for omitting to mention the presence of knives. He declared: "When reactions are this strong and epidermal, it's because there's always a lack of nuance". He added, however, that his aim "was not to establish a definitive truth".

An investigation published on 5 December 2023 by Le Parisien, and picked up by several national media, disagreed with the hypothesis of a deliberate attack, leaning instead towards a brawl that degenerated, against a background of prior tensions, between young people who had spent an evening together. When the situation degenerated, initially only between two young people from the two groups, racist remarks were heard on both sides. The account given by the extreme right thus seems to have proceeded from a simplification and a form of political recuperation. Le Parisien's investigation provoked indignant reactions from certain political leaders and editorialists on the right and extreme right, such as Pascal Praud.

On 14 February 2024, Arcom called France 5 to order after being notified about this editorial. Arcom considered that "certain remarks, devoid of verbal precautions and made in a declarative manner, did not meet the requirements of moderation, rigor, and honesty set out in the specifications of the France Télévisions company".
