= Patrick Cohen =

French journalist (born 1962)

- Born: 7 September 1962 (age 63); Paris, France
- Education: École supérieure de journalisme de Lille
- Alma mater: Pierre-Mendès-France Tolbiac University Center (Paris 1 Panthéon-Sorbonne University)
- Occupations: Journalist; radio host; television presenter; columnist; editorial writer
- Spouse: Alexandra Cooren
- Children: 3

Patrick Cohen (born 7 September 1962) is a French journalist, radio host, television presenter, columnist, and editorial writer.

He is known for having hosted the 7/9 program on France Inter between 2010 and 2017. He also worked at Europe 1 from 2017 to 2021. He returned to Radio France in August 2021 to host L'Esprit public on France Culture. He left Radio France in September 2023. Starting in September 2024, he serves as a political editorialist on France Inter’s morning show.

On television, he has been a columnist on France 5’s C à vous since 2011 and a presenter on LCP - Assemblée nationale since 2018.

== Early life and education ==
Patrick Cohen was born on 7 September 1962, in Paris, France, to a Moroccan family; his father was an engineer and owner of a small metalworking business, and his mother was a homemaker. He also has two Sicilian grandparents. His father is Catholic and the son of a Jewish father, and his mother is also Catholic.

He grew up in Montreuil, Seine-Saint-Denis, where he earned his scientific baccalaureate at age 16. After failing the entrance exam for Sciences Po, he earned a master’s degree in law and a diploma from the Lille School of Journalism (French: École supérieure de journalisme de Lille). At the Pierre-Mendès-France Tolbiac University Center (Paris 1 Panthéon-Sorbonne University), he was active in the Union Nationale des Étudiants de France (UNEF) student union. He performed his military service at the 114th Air Base in Aix-Les-Milles, but he managed to be discharged after one month.

== Career ==
Cohen began his career in radio by working as a reporter, and then as a host and deputy editor-in-chief at RFO Guyane and Radio France Internationale, and also worked on the editorial staff at France Info.

=== 1994–2007: RTL ===
In 1994, Cohen joined the editorial staff at RTL. There, he presented news bulletins, produced reports, and later hosted the call-in show Les auditeurs ont la parole.

In 1998, he joined the station’s political desk, notably to cover the 2002 French presidential election and to host the Sunday interview show Le Grand Jury starting in 2001.

From August 2005 to June 2006, he hosted the morning show RTL Matin for almost a year. Starting in September 2006, he resumed hosting the news program RTL Soir, as its presenter, Hervé Beroud, became the station's editorial director.

=== 2007–2010: France Inter, Canal+, and Europe 1 ===
In September 2007, after thirteen years at RTL, Cohen joined the editorial team at France Inter as editor-in-chief of the morning news program and host of the 8 o'clock news on Nicolas Demorand's 7/10. He remained at the station for only nearly a year, leaving in June 2008.

Cohen also made his television debut in 2007 on Pascale Clark's Un café, l'addition, which aired on Canal+.

In August 2008, Cohen joined the station Europe 1 to co-host Europe 1 Soir with Marie Drucker. He also appeared on the Sunday interview show Le Grand Rendez-vous, and also served as the substitute for Marc-Olivier Fogiel on the morning show during the 2008–2009 season.

In August 2009, Cohen took over sole hosting duties for Europe 1 Soir, while Drucker went on to host a weekly current affairs analysis program.

=== 2010–2017: Return to France Inter ===
In September 2010, following Nicolas Demorand’s departure from the station’s morning show, Cohen returned to France Inter to host Le sept neuf, with the goal of "further enhancing its liveliness and responsiveness", according to Philippe Val, the director of France Inter. On 10 May 2017, Cohen announced his resignation from France Inter to rejoin Europe 1 in the fall of 2017.

Mediapart called Cohen's management practices into question in a February 2025 article that compiled testimonies describing aggressive management between 2010 and 2017. Nineteen anonymous testimonies from Radio France employees denounce a management style deemed "anxiety-inducing, toxic, and stressful", marked by "scathing remarks", "harsh" criticism, and intense professional pressure. Some former employees describe repeated humiliations and psychological distress at work.

=== 2011–present: France 5 ===
In August 2011, Cohen joined the team of the show C à vous, hosted by Anne-Élisabeth Lemoine (formerly hosted by Alessandra Sublet and Anne-Sophie Lapix) on France 5, succeeding Nicolas Poincaré and Thierry Dugeon.

On 11 January 2015, Cohen was a co-host with Anne-Sophie Lapix and Nagui Fam for a benefit event for Charlie Hebdo, titled Je suis Charlie, on France 2, France Inter, France Culture, France Bleu, TV5 Monde, and the RTBF.

=== 2017–2021: Return to Europe 1 ===
Cohen's return to Europe 1 was a major and highly anticipated presenter move in 2017, as he succeeded Thomas Sotto on the station's morning show, which he renamed Europe Matin, while also becoming the station's deputy director; though, despite his anticipated return, he failed to reverse a sharp decline in ratings that had been underway since 2016. According to Le Figaro, Cohen's morning show was driving away the most conservative listeners and had failed to attract those from France Inter.

On 4 June 2018, Cohen was removed from Europe 1's morning show, with Nikos Aliagas taking over the news segment when the new season began, but despite this, starting in September 2018, Cohen was given David Abiker‘s time slot to host the shows C'est arrivé cette semaine and C'est arrivé demain, on Saturday and Sunday mornings. Starting in the fall of 2020, he hosted the station's midday news.

On 30 June 2021, Cohen joined speakers outside the Europe 1 headquarters during a rally organized by an inter-union coalition (Syndicat national des journalistes CGT (SNJ-CGT) - CFTC - FO) and the Europe 1 Editors’ Association to denounce Vincent Bolloré’s "growing influence" in the media, saying: "The model that is winning out today... is one that seeks not to produce information and knowledge, nor social cohesion... but rather to create controversies and divisions, to pit one part of France against another, even through calls for hatred—this has been ruled on by the courts." Cohen announced his departure from Europe 1 the month after, in July 2021.

=== 2018–present: LCP - Assemblée nationale ===
Since 4 November 2018, Cohen has been hosting the show Rembob'INA, which features archival footage from French television while inviting key figures from that era to comment on it. Meanwhile, Agnès Chauveau, deputy director of the Institut national de l'audiovisuel, who is a media specialist and historian by training, and Richard Poirot, editorial coordinator at the INA, provide context and discuss the criticism raised at the time of their original broadcasts.

=== 2020–2024: France 2, return to Radio France, and second return to France Inter ===
At the start of the 2021 season, Cohen returned to Radio France to host the program L'Esprit public on France Culture.

On 26 May 2023, two years after his return, Cohen announced he was leaving Radio France in September 2023, disappointed that he would not be returning to host the morning show on France Info in the fall of 2023, as had been planned. On the other hand, the prospect of competition between the morning shows on France Inter and France Info convinced management not to appoint Cohen, which prompted his departure.

In July 2024, it was announced that he would return to France Inter to host the morning show’s political commentary segment starting in September. The ousting of Yaël Goosz from France Inter’s morning show–a casualty of Patrick Cohen’s much-anticipated return–led to a vote of no confidence by the editorial staff against Adèle Van Reeth on 11 July.

== Personal life ==
Cohen is married to journalist Alexandra Cooren, with whom he has three children: two sons, Bastien and Aurélien, and a daughter, Juliette.

== Awards ==
In 2016, Cohen was named Host of the Year by GQ France.

== Filmography ==
- 2010: Lulu Vroumette by Daniel Picouly and Frédéric Pillot: Brico (voice in 7 episodes)
- 2016: Marseille by Dan Franck: himself
- 2018: Baron Noir by Eric Benzekri and Jean-Baptiste Delafon: himself (season 2, episode 2: "Tourniquet")
- 2019: Fahim by Pierre-François Martin-Laval: himself
- 2023: Mystifications by Dimitri Queffelec: screenwriter and investigator
- 2025: Le Répondeur by Fabienne Godet: himself
