= Maya Lauqué =

French journalist and television presenter

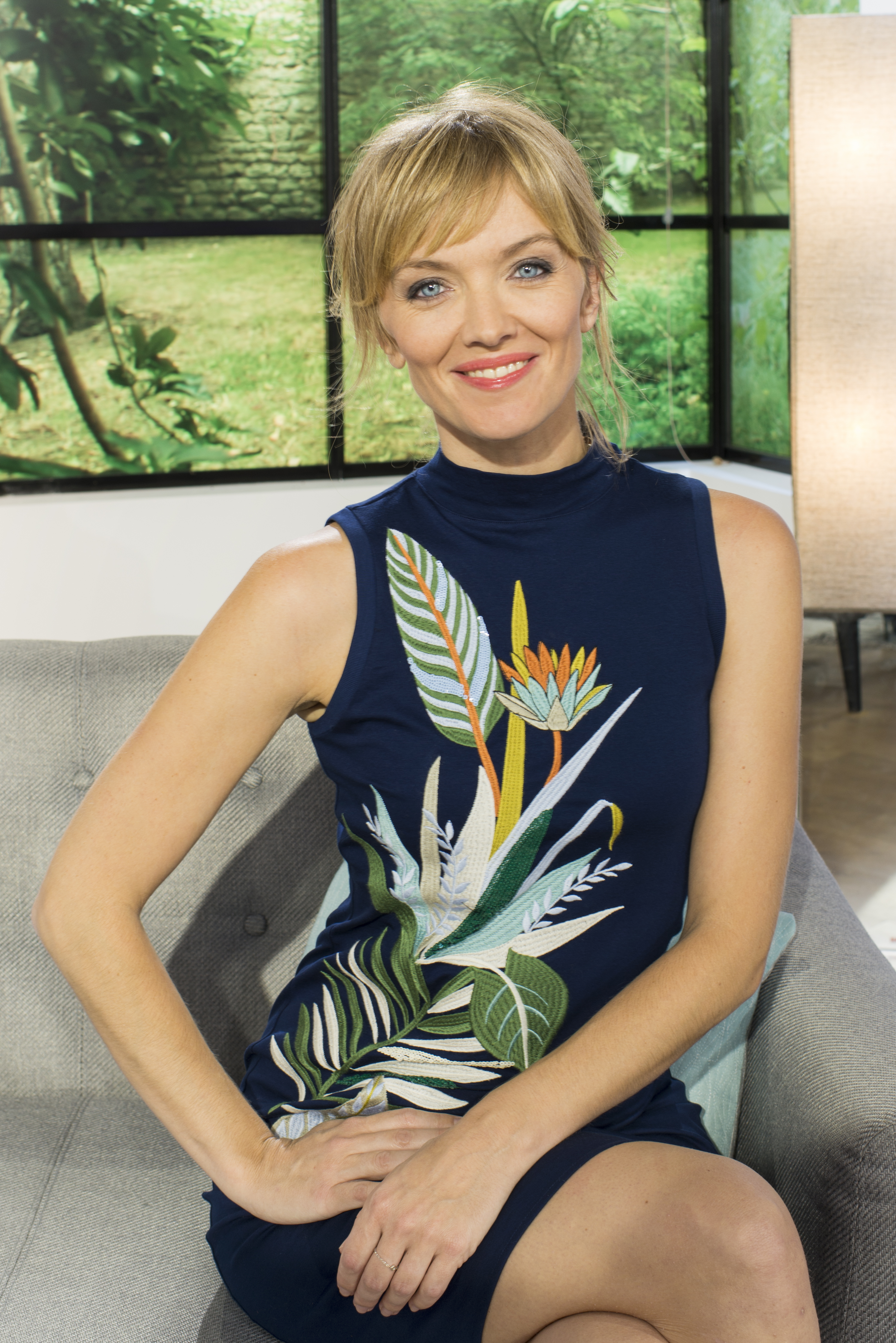
- Maya Lauqué in 2016
- Born: 11 February 1979 (age 47); Bayonne, France
- Occupations: Journalist; TV presenter
- Employer(s): I-Télé (2007–13); France 5 (2013–21); France 2 (2021-present)
- Known for: TV host of Télématin on week-ends

Maya Lauqué (born 11 February 1979) is a French journalist and television presenter. Presenting on I-Télé from 2007 to 2013, she co-hosts since September 2013 the program La Quotidienne on France 5.

== Early life and education ==
Maya Lauqué was born in Bayonne in the department of Pyrénées-Atlantiques, the daughter of Henri Lauqué, presenter of the committee of the Fêtes de Bayonne. A passionate of dancing, she took classes at the Opéra de Paris and then at the Conservatoire de Paris from age thirteen to seventeen. She finally returned to her second passion, journalism. At age 18, she started working for the daily regional newspaper Sud-Ouest and also for magazines dedicated to dancing, while studying with a DEUG in modern literature. Once graduated, she studied with a bachelor's degree at the French Press Institute in 2000, after an internship of three months at Infosport+, she got a job and did not pass her final exams.

== Television career ==
Hired at Infosport+ to work behind the scenes, she then passed on the other side and began as a presenter. In 2002, she joined TPS Star, where she presented matches of the Premier League in London, helped by the knowledge of soccer from her brother.

Noticed by the director of the redaction of I-Télé, she joined the channel in 2006 as a newsreader of i matin with Aymeric Caron (7:00-9:00). From early 2007 to July 2009, she presents the evening news, especially in the program 1 h 30 chrono (18:00-19:30) hosted by Thomas Hugues until July 2008, and then live news from 18:00 to 20:00 with Nicolas Demorand. Since September 2009, she joined the midday segment from 12:00 to 14:00 to co-host Le Forum de L'Info alongside Benjamin Vincent, and then alone since January 2010.

In September 2011, she presented again the morning news on I-Télé from 6:00 to 9:00, and pursued the presentation of the weekly debate Ça se dispute that she started again in January 2011. In September 2012, Maya Lauqué presents the news of La grande édition hosted by Olivier Galzi between 22:00 and 0:00. In September 2013, she left I-Télé to co-host the consumption program La Quotidienne on France 5.

== Personal life ==
Maya Lauqué announced on 18 November 2014 in direct on France 5 that she was pregnant, stating that she could not hide it anymore. She gave birth in early April 2015 to a boy named Lucien.

In February 2018, she announced that she was expecting her second child. She gave birth on July 16, 2018 to a daughter named Jeanne. On April 7, 2025, she revealed in an interview that Cyril Denis, a French rock and pop musician, is the father of both of her children.

== Television programs ==
i-Télé (2007–13)

- i matin and i matin week-end
- 1 h 30 Chrono
- Le 18-20
- À propos
- Le forum de l'info
- Le match des éditorialistes
- Ça se dispute
- L'info sans interdit
- Le 6-9
- Le journal de la nuit
- La grande édition
- L'édition de la nuit

France 5 (2013–2021)

- La Quotidienne

France 2 (2021–present)

- Télématin
