= Sébastien Demorand =

French journalist (1969–2020)

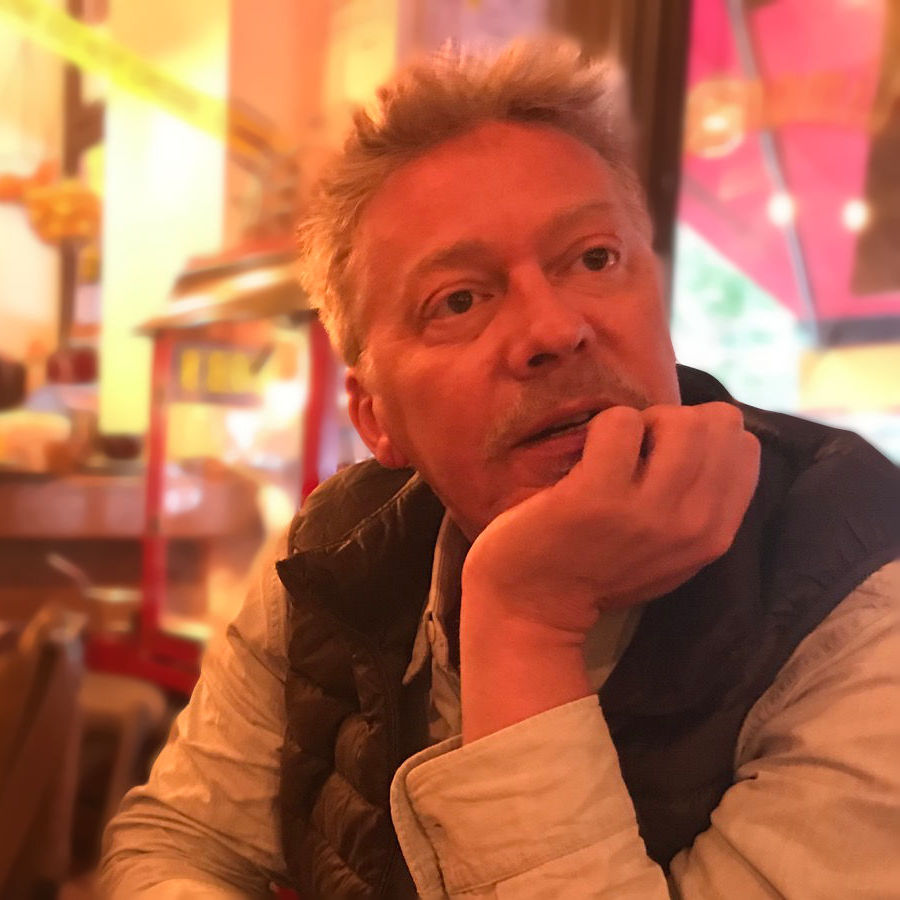
- Demorand in 2018
- Born: August 4, 1969; Harare, Rhodesia (now Zimbabwe)
- Died: January 21, 2020 (aged 50); Villejuif, France
- Education: Paris-Sorbonne University; Centre de formation des journalistes
- Occupations: Journalist, food critic
- Television: MasterChef (TF1)
- Family: Nicolas Demorand (brother)

Sébastien Demorand (4 August 1969 – 21 January 2020) was a French journalist and food critic. He worked in radio as a news presenter and columnist on Europe 1 and RTL and was a judge on the TF1 TV show MasterChef from 2010 to 2013.

== Early life and career ==
Sébastien Demorand was born on 4 August 1969, in Harare, Rhodesia (now Zimbabwe), and was the son of diplomat Jacques Demorand, who worked in the United States, Belgium, Morocco and Japan. He was the brother of journalist and radio presenter Nicolas Demorand and sculptor Catherine Demorand.

After studying at the Paris-Sorbonne University graduating with a degree in political science, and spending two years at the CFJ (Centre de Formation des Journalistes) in Paris, Demorand worked as a freelance journalist for Actuel magazine. In 1993, he joined the editorial team at Europe 1, where he worked as a senior reporter and then presenter of the morning television news, and, starting in 1999, was a contributor for the food guide Gault et Millau. Independent since 2002, he contributed to the French newspaper Le Parisien, and the French magazines Zurban, Régal, and Le Fooding.

From 2003 onwards, and for around ten years, Demorand took part in the Omnivore food fair created by Luc Dubanchet. In 2004, Sébastien Demorand coined the term "bistronomie", or "bistronomy", during a meeting of the Le Fooding 2004 jury.

From 2006 to 2018, Demorand was a columnist for RTL on the program RTL Week-end matin hosted by Bernard Poirette, where he presented the segment “Ça vaut le goût” (“It's Worth the Taste”) and co-hosted “Maison jardin cuisine brocante” (“Home, Garden, Cooking, Flea Market”) with Laëtitia Nallet, Églantine Éméyé and Thierry Denis, and was also a columnist for the magazine L'Optimum.

=== MasterChef ===
From 2010 to 2013, Demorand was a member of the jury in the French version of MasterChef on TF1. He was the only food critic among the chefs Frédéric Anton, Yves Camdeborde and Amandine Chaignot. He was fluent in English and also appeared as a special guest in episode 18 of the second season of MasterChef US. He was nicknamed "Assurancetourix". Les Inrockuptibles said of him, "He has a slightly offbeat role, even that of the villain." He also participated with the same jury in the junior version of the program, presented by Carole Rousseau.

In 2011, he was the guest of honor on episode 18 of season 2 of MasterChef in the United States, to give his opinion on the dishes of the last four contestants.

=== Le Bel Ordinaire ===
In 2016, Demorand set up a "cellar-canteen-grocery store" project with Cyrille Rossetto, called Le Bel Ordinaire, supported by a crowdfunding campaign that brought together 104 shareholders in nine months. Le Bel Ordinaire opened on 14 March 2017 at 54 rue de Paradis in Paris. The kitchen is run by chef Nicolas Fabre. A second establishment opened its doors in 2019.

== Death ==
Demorand died of cancer on 21 January 2020, at the Hôpital Paul-Brousse in Villejuif, at the age of 50. His funeral was held ten days later, on 31 January 2020, at the Père-Lachaise Crematorium, where he was cremated.

Two years after his death, his brother Nicolas Demorand paid tribute to him on the program Le sept neuf on France Inter, a program he hosts.

== Books ==
- Sébastien Demorand, Emmanuel Rubin, Cantines: Recettes cultes corrigées par les chefs, A. Viénot, 2006, 146 pages (ISBN 9782262025427)
- Bénédict Beaugé, Sébastien Demorand, Les cuisines de la critique gastronomique, Éditions du Seuil, 2009, 113 pages (ISBN 9782020985642)
- Sébastien Demorand, Vincent Sorel, Petit traité de philosophie charcutière, Éditions du Rouergue, 2011, 68 pages (ISBN 9782812603112)
