= National Organization for Organ and Tissues Donation and Transplantation (Lebanon) =

Lebanese organ donation and transplant organization

- اللجنة الوطنية لوهب وزراعة الأعضاء والأنسجة
- Abbreviation: NOD-Lb
- Founded: 2002
- Type: Governmental organization
- Purpose: Increase organ donation in Lebanon to reach self-sufficiency
- Headquarters: Hazmiyeh, Mount Lebanon
- Region served: Local
- Method: Organ donation
- Website: www.nodlb.org
- Formerly called: NOOTDT (previous abbreviation)

The National Organization for Organ and Tissue Donation and Transplant (NOD-Lb) is a Lebanese non-profit organization affiliated to the Lebanese Ministry of Public Health. NOD-Lb (previously known as NOOTDT) was created by a joint venture between the Ministry of Public Health and the Lebanese Order of Physicians in Beirut.

== NOOTDT's mission ==
- To retrieve organs and tissues from any donor in all Lebanese regions by a skilled coordinator team available 24 hours a day, 7 days a week.
- To provide locally retrieved organs and tissues to patients in need of organ and tissue transplantation.
- To implement a Lebanese Model for Organ and Tissue Donation and Transplantation:
1. Define the criteria of donation and transplantation in Lebanon
2. Responsible for a continuous education of ICU and ER personnel
3. Plan the conditions of the national waiting list and a network system
4. Carry on establishing a registry of death, chronic diseases, donation and transplantation
- To promote organ and tissue donation by continuous awareness campaigns for the public
- Introduce organ and tissue donation and transplantation in schools and universities program
- To coordinate with international organ and tissue banking organizations
- Organize and participate a national and international medical congress or courses in the field
