= Vincent Josse =

French journalist

- Born: 4 December 1966 (age 59); Abbeville (Somme, France)
- Education: Contemporary History Master's Degree, Lille III IUT de journalisme de Bordeaux
- Occupations: journalist, Radio personality, Producer at France Inter
- Employer(s): France Inter, Arte

Vincent Josse, born on December 4, 1966 in Abbeville, is a French radio journalist who has worked at France Inter since 1990. From September 2017 to June 2023, he presented the Sunday culture show Le Grand Atelier. Starting in September 2023, he presents two shows at 5 PM on the weekends: La Ballade on Saturdays and a revised version of Le Grand Atelier on Sundays.

== Biography ==
=== Development ===
Vincent Josse is from Abbeville, in Picardy. He completed his secondary education in Amiens before moving to Lille to study literature and history, then to Bordeaux where he enrolled at the Bordeaux Institute of Journalism. After internships in print media at La Voix du Nord and France-Soir, he had an internship at France Inter radio in 1989 and was particularly drawn to this medium.

=== Radio and television ===
Vincent Josse joined the editorial team at France Inter in 1990 as a presenter for news flashes and information bulletins. In 1993, he joined the "Arts, Literature and Performances" department before presenting the 7:24 cultural segment in Stéphane Paoli's morning show from 2000 to 2006. From September 2006 to June 25, 2010, Vincent Josse hosted a daily cultural program called Esprit critique from 9:10 to 9:30 in Nicolas Demorand's morning show, Le Sept Dix, on France Inter. From September 2010 to June 2014, Vincent Josse produced a weekly show called L'Atelier on Saturdays from 7:20 PM to 8:00 PM. In 2013, Flammarion published the book L'Atelier, based on the show and illustrated with his photos, featuring 27 studio visits.

He was also a drama critic on Le Masque et la Plume from 2001 to 2024.

On television, he presented the show Square on Sundays at 11:45 AM on Arte from January 2012 to September 2013.

He presented the cultural morning show on France Musique from September 2014 to June 2016. Starting with the 2016 season, he presented a musical program called La Récréation on France Inter. From 2017 to June 2023, he presented the Sunday cultural show Le Grand Atelier on France Inter.

Starting in September 2023, he presents two shows at 5 PM on weekends: "La Ballade" on Saturdays and a revised version of "Le Grand Atelier" on Sundays.

== Awards ==
Vincent Josse received the Académie Charles-Cros Grand Prix in 2009 in the "Memory and Creation" category for his book-CD Hervé Guibert, l'écrivain photographe.

== Publications ==
- Matin brun, by Franck Pavloff, book-CD with Jacques Bonnaffé and Denis Podalydès, cover by Enki Bilal, published by RF, 2002
- Hervé Guibert, l’écrivain photographe, published by Naïve, 2009, EAN 3298490120187
- L'Atelier, art history collection, Flammarion, 2013, 250 p. ISBN 978-2081286009

Based on his France Inter show, L'Atelier, meeting 27 artists

- Montand est à nous, documentary film directed by Yves Jeuland, co-written with Vincent Josse, France 3, 2021
- Foreword for the disc Yves Montand, Olympia 74, INA, 2022
- Le Bus 72, a photography book by Vincent Josse with ten texts by authors, Éditions Le Bec en l'air, September 2023
