= Quatuor Mosaïques =

Austrian string quartet

The Quatuor Mosaïques is an Austrian string quartet, founded in 1987 by Erich Höbarth, Andrea Bischof, Anita Mitterer, and Christophe Coin, four members of the Concentus Musicus Wien who play on historical musical instruments. The name of the quartet refers to mosaics and is intended to reference the way details impact on the complete work of art. They specialize in music of the 18th century.

The three Austrian musicians and the French cellist Christophe Coin got to know each other in Vienna as members of Concentus Musicus working under the direction of Nikolaus Harnoncourt. With their shared experiences as a starting point, they decided to form a classical string quartet playing on period instruments. The primary aim was not to create the sort of ‘authenticity’ that belongs in museums, but rather to ensure in their work a living link to the great European quartet tradition. Hence an essential inspiration for the group was the Végh Quartet, of which Erich Höbarth had been a member for its last three years.

The Quatuor Mosaïques has received the Gramophone Award for its interpretations of Haydn. It has given concerts with pianists András Schiff and Patrick Cohen, clarinettists Wolfgang and Sabine Meyer, and cellists Miklós Perényi and Raphaël Pidoux.

In 2006 the Quatuor was invited to Spain to play the quartet of Stradivari instruments belonging to the Spanish Crown. It presented a programme of quartets by Arriaga at the Royal Palace in Madrid, which was subsequently recorded on CD. The Quatuor Mosaïques' very extensive repertoire includes rarely performed works by Pleyel, Tomasini, Werner, Jadin, Gross, Boëly, Schumann, and Brahms. It has performed works of the early twentieth century, by composers such as Debussy, Bartók and Webern.

== Discography ==
The group's first recordings were on the Astree label of Michel Bernstein. The Quatuor's discography includes works by Arriaga, Beethoven, Boccherini, Boëly, Haydn, H. Jadin, Mendelssohn, Mozart and Schubert.

- Albrechtsberger, Entre ciel et terre (2009, coll. « Parenthèses », Laborie label LC24508) OCLC 906258105
- Arriaga, Trois quatuors à cordes (1-7 September 2006, Universal Music) OCLC 430971632
- Beethoven, Quatuors à cordes nos 1 - 6, op. 18 (April 1994, September 2004 et March 2005, Astrée / 3CD Naïve) OCLC 32951649, 61688263, 780028684
- Beethoven, Quatuors à cordes nos 12 - 16 (2017, 3 SACD Naïve)
- Boccherini, Quintettes avec piano, op. 56 et 57 [G.407-408 et G.411] et [G.414-415 et G.418] « dédiés à la Nation Française » - Quatuor Mosaïques et Patrick Cohen, piano-forte (October 1993 et November 1989, Astrée E 8518 & E 8721) OCLC 30652640, OCLC 23160715
- Boëly, Trio en ut majeur, op. 5 n° 2 - Quatuor à cordes n° 1 - Mélodie pour violoncelle n° 2 en mi majeur - Sextuor en ré majeur - Quatuor Mosaïques, Christophe Coin, Éric Lebrun, orgue (2009, Laborie label) OCLC 495067992
- David, Troisième quatuor en ré mineur (May 2010, coll. « Parenthèses », Laborie LC 24585) OCLC 884862067
- Johann Benjamin Gross - – Bal(l)ade Romantique (Laborie, LC09)
- Joseph Haydn — repris en coffret de 10CD OCLC 865013406 :
  - Quatuors opus 20 (janvier 1990 et mars 1992, 2CD Astrée E 8786 / E8785) OCLC 221968911, 600014570
  - Quatuors opus 33 (August 1995 et October 1996, 2CD Astrée-Auvidis) OCLC 52419401, 640058223
  - Quatuors opus 64 (June 2003, Naïve) OCLC 54968124, 417449015
  - Quatuors opus 76 (November 1998 et January 2000, 2CD Astrée / Naïve E 8665) OCLC 225495609, 850882933
  - Quatuors opus 77 (March 1989, Astrée E 8800) OCLC 386773363
  - Les sept dernières paroles de Notre Rédempteur sur la croix (17 April 1992, Astrée E 8803) OCLC 63161187
- Hyacinthe et Louis Emmanuel Jadin, Trois quatuors à cordes : op. 3 n° 1, op. 2 n° 1; Quatuor n° 2 (October 1994, Valois V4738 / Naïve V4903) OCLC 221471820, 659256760, BnF 38589737f
- Mendelssohn, Quatuor à cordes, op. 12 et 13 (December 1997, Astrée-Auvidis) OCLC 40419654
- Mozart — Les quatuors étant repris en coffret de 4CD OCLC 57362659 :
  - Quatuor à cordes 18 et 19 (November 1993, Astrée E 8748)
  - Quatuor à cordes K 387 et 421 (September 1990, Astrée E 8746) OCLC 870140873
  - Quatuors à cordes K 499 et K 589 (January 2001, Astrée-Auvidis) OCLC 48512769
  - Quatuors à cordes K 575 et K 590 (July 1998, Astrée) OCLC 56915122
  - Quintette avec clarinette K 581; Trio « les quilles » K 498 - Wolfgang Meyer, clarinette; Patrick Cohen, hammerflügel (October et November 1992, Astrée E 8736 / Naïve) OCLC 71442218, 854864739
- Schubert :
  - Quatuors à cordes nos 1 & 13 opus 125/D87 et opus 29/D 804 « Rosamunde » (Astrée-Auvidis E 8580) OCLC 77252554
  - Quatuor à cordes « Der Tod und das Mädchen », D 810; Quatuor à cordes, D 173 (2009, Laborie) OCLC 857092753
- Woelfl, Quatuors à cordes op. 4 n° 3 et op. 10 nos 1 & 4 - sur des instruments du luthier viennois, Franz Geissenhof (1753–1821) (26-30 September 2011, Paladino Music PMR0023) OCLC 808668204

== Founding (and current) members ==
- Erich Höbarth (violin, J. Guarnerius filius Andreae, Cremona 1705)
- Andrea Bischof (violin, 18th century French)
- Anita Mitterer (viola, Girolamo Devirchis, Brescia 1588)
- Christophe Coin (cello, C.A. Testore, Milano 1758)
