= Valérie Durier =

French journalist and TV host (born 1966)

- Born: October 4, 1966 (age 59)
- Occupations: journalist, Television presenter and radio personality
- Years active: Since 1990
- Known for: Presenter of Le Doc du dimanche

Valérie Durier, born on October 4, 1966, is a French journalist, columnist, television and radio host.

She spent 18 years at Europe 1 in various journalist and presenter roles until she had her own show for four years. Since 2011, she has presented Le Doc du dimanche, the documentary slot on France 5, and has also filled in twice in 2011 and 2013 as the host of C'est notre affaire. From 2013 to 2015, she was a consumer columnist on La Quotidienne on the same channel, as well as a temporary co-host for several months.

== Biography ==
After completing a Master's degree in political science at Paris-II University, Valérie Durier attended the French Press Institute for journalist training. She then obtained a DESS in National Defense.

In 1990, she began her career at Europe 1 as a journalist. Over several years, she held various positions: field reporting, morning news presentation, and guest interviews.

In 1997, she made her first foray into television on Téva to host a health-related show.

At the radio station Europe 1, she hosted a two-hour daily program from 2002 to 2006 on social and psychological issues. The daily live broadcast from 2 PM to 4 PM featured psychologists and listener testimonies. In 2006, she had an open microphone from 1 PM to 2 PM daily, discussing current affairs with listeners.

In 2007, she returned to morning news, as well as the 12 PM and 12:30 PM slots in Jean-Marc Morandini's Le Grand Direct de l'Actu. In the summer of 2008, she left Europe 1 for France 3. Starting in September, she presented a daily interactive magazine called @ la carte, where she explored everyday themes and responded live to viewer concerns.

During the summer of 2010, she returned to radio, co-hosting On peut vous aider même l'été with Jean-Michel Zecca on RTL, a service and community-focused show.

In February 2011, she replaced Claire Fournier, who was on maternity leave, presenting the consumer magazine C'est notre affaire and the Sunday evening documentary slot Le Doc du dimanche on France 5. In June 2011, she stepped down from C'est notre affaire but retained her role on Le Doc du dimanche.

In 2012, she co-hosted the culinary show Planète Gourmande with chef Joël Robuchon on France 3. At the same time, she temporarily took over the reins of C'est notre affaire in spring 2013.

From 2013 to 2015, she participated as a columnist in the daily consumer magazine La Quotidienne on France 5, and later co-hosted it.

She continued presenting Le Doc du Dimanche on France 5 until 2016 when she went back to studies and training to develop activities in the field of Ericksonian hypnosis and neuro-linguistic programming (NLP). Following these studies, she opened two psychotherapy practices in Île-de-France.

== Timeline ==
- 2008: Presenter of @ la carte on France 3
- 2011: Presenter of C'est notre affaire on France 5
- Since 2011: Presenter of Le Doc du dimanche on France 5
- 2012: Co-host of Planète Gourmande on France 3
- 2013: Presenter of C'est notre affaire on France 5
- 2013-2015: Columnist and co-presenter of La Quotidienne on France 5
