= Aline Asmar d'Amman =

- Born: February 8, 1975 (age 50); Hazmiyeh
- Education: Lebanese Academy of Fine Arts
- Occupations: architect and interior designer

Aline Asmar d'Amman (born February 8, 1975) is a Lebanon-born architect active in Paris and Beirut. Her projects include the restaurant in the Eiffel Tower.

== Life ==
d'Amman was born in 1975 in Beirut suburb of Hazmiyeh in a country at war. Some of her family moved abroad during hostilities but her parents remained in Lebanon where her father was involved in the aluminium industry.

She was a top graduate at the Lebanese Academy of Fine Arts.In 1999 she began five years of working for the French architect Jean-Michel Wilmotte. She was part of Wilmotte's team trying to combine modern architecture with heritage designs and she worked on the restoration of the Sursock Museum in her home city.

She established her own architecture company in both Beirut and Paris in 2011 with less than a dozen employees with a bias towards women employees. In March 2013, the luxurious Hôtel de Crillon closed for a series of renovations led by d'Amman. This project was designed to renovate and modernize the space. The renovation combined the hotel's protected landmark features, such as the 19th-century grand staircase and saloons, with modern styles and amenities. Tristan Auer, Chahan Minassian, Cyril Vergniol and Karl Lagerfeld worked alongside d'Amman on this €200 million project. Karl Lagerfeld designed Les Grands Apartements, the most extravagant suites on the property. The 2013 renovations lasted until July 2017.

The Michelin-starred restaurant La Jules Verne enjoys a location on the second level of the Eiffel Tower. They employed her to create a new interior where she worked with their chef Frédéric Anton. She had won the work based on her small team and its ultra feminine approach.

d'Amman was one of the small number of contemporary women creators chosen to be included in The New Parisienne book by Lindsey Tramuta in 2020. In 2022 she designed the Lebanese Pavilion at the Venice Biennale. She's also responsible for the interior design of the future luxury train Dream of the Desert, which is scheduled to run in Saudi Arabia from 2026.

== Private life ==
d'Amman wears and collects garments made by Chanel as she admires their approach to design. Her husband and two children live in Switzerland.
