= Christophe Coin =

French musician and conductor

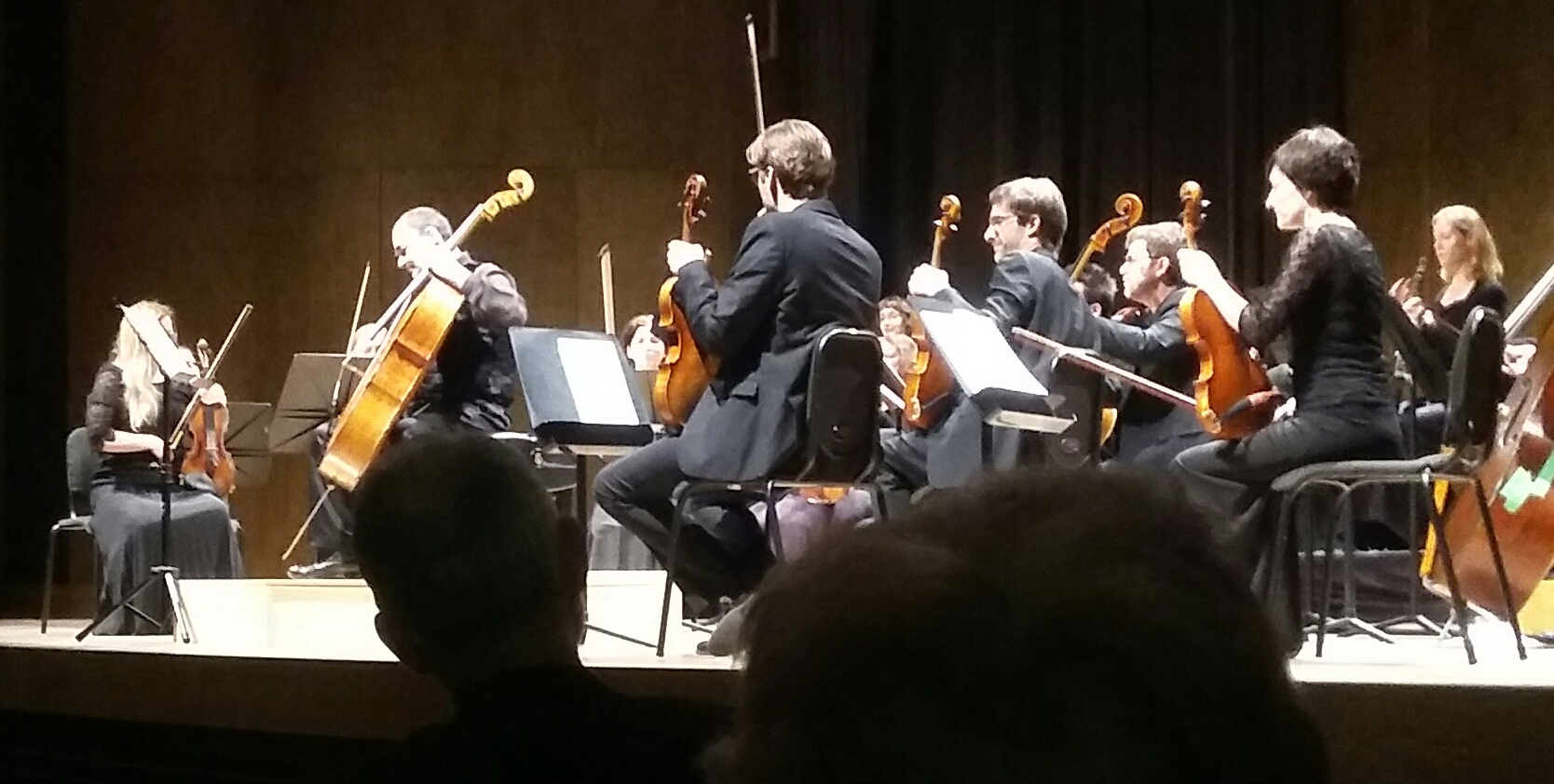
- Coin and Les Violons du Roy, at the "Claire and Marc Bourgie Pavilion" of the Montreal Museum of Fine Arts in 2016
- Born: 26 January 1958 (age 68); Caen, France
- Education: Conservatoire de Paris; Schola Cantorum Basiliensis
- Occupations: Cellist; Gambist; Conductor
- Organizations: Quatuor Mosaïques; Ensemble Baroque de Limoges

Christophe Coin (French: [kwɛ̃]; born 26 January 1958) is a French cellist, viola da gamba player and conductor active in the field of historically informed performance. He is the cellist of the Quatuor Mosaïques and is the director of the Ensemble Baroque de Limoges.

== Career ==
Born in Caen, Coin studied with Jacques Ripoche. At the Conservatoire de Paris, he studied cello with André Navarra and graduated in 1974. From 1976, he studied on a scholarship in Vienna. He was influenced by Nikolaus Harnoncourt, among others. From 1978, he studied viola da gamba with Jordi Savall at the Schola Cantorum Basiliensis.

He worked first mainly as a soloist. In 1984, he founded the Mosaïques Ensemble and in 1987 the string quartet Quatuor Mosaïques with Erich Höbarth, Andrea Bischof and Anita Mitterer, all players members of the Concentus Musicus Wien. The quartet has performed mostly works of the classical period on period instruments, with a focus on less known works. After a 2012 concert in New York, their playing was reviewed as "balancing period instruments and historically informed performance practice with contemporary interpretive impulses like no other". Since 1991, Coin has been director of the Ensemble Baroque de Limoges, for performances of cantatas, oratorio and operas of the 17th and 18th century on period instruments.

Since 1988, Coin has been a teacher for Baroque cello and viola da gamba at the Conservatoire National Supérieur de Musique in Paris and at the Schola Cantorum Basiliensis. He has organised workshops on the building and playing of historic instruments.

In 1991 he played as part of the sound-track to the French film Tous les Matins du Monde.

== Selected recordings ==
Coin has recorded some 50 CDs, both as a soloist and with ensembles. Several of them were awarded prizes. He recorded Purcell's trio sonatas and Haydn's cello concertos with Christopher Hogwood. The Quatuor Mosaïques recorded Luigi Boccherini's quintets with Patrick Cohen playing pianoforte. Beginning in 1993, Coin conducted and played Bach's ten cantatas with violoncello piccolo within three years at the church of Ponitz, Thuringia, using its 1737 Gottfried Silbermann organ. Some cantatas feature the Leipziger Concerto Vocale, some the Chœur de Chambre Accentus, all the Ensemble Baroque de Limoges and soloists Barbara Schlick, Andreas Scholl, Christoph Prégardien and Gotthold Schwarz, including Jesu, nun sei gepreiset, BWV 41 for New Year's Day. A review notes: "As the piccolo cello soloist the supremely talented Christophe Coin plays with authority displaying exceptional control of phrasing and dynamics". In 2004, he recorded with the Quatuor Mosaiques Haydn's six string quartets Op. 64.
