= Lulu Zipadoo =

French animated television series

- Genre: Children's; Animated
- Created by: Frédéric Pillot; Daniel Picouly
- Directed by: Charles Sansonetti
- Country of origin: France
- Original language: French
- No. of seasons: 2
- No. of episodes: 104

Production
- Running time: 13 minutes

Original release
- Network: France 5
- Release: 2010 – 2013

Lulu Zipadoo (French: Lulu Vroumette) is a French animated television series, produced by Mondo TV France, The series is based on a series of children's books by Daniel Picouly and Frédéric Pillot, it premiered on 2010, on the France Télévisions's platform Zouzous on France 5.

== Characters ==
- Lulu
- Hattie

== Broadcast ==
In France, the series premiered on 2010, on the France Télévisions's platform Zouzous on France 5. In the United Kingdom, the series airs on CBeebies on BBC Two.
