= Franck Pavloff =

French psychologist, novelist, and poet (born 1940)

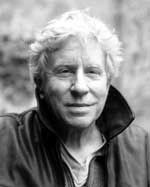
- Franck Pavloff in 2010
- Born: 24 April 1940 (age 86); Nîmes, France

Franck Pavloff (born 24 April 1940) is a French psychologist, novelist, and poet. Franck Pavloff currently lives in Isère, in eastern France, between trips. His Bulgarian father raised him in a way to develop a critical mind and a need for freedom, bequeathing him "the imperious taste of barbed wire and shoving confiscated thoughts" (blurb for the short story Brown Morning).

== Life experience ==
He spent over twenty years between Africa, Asia, Latin America, and France working in the fields of social communities development and the defence of children's rights. He is an expert psychologist for the Courts of Appeals.

His first novel was published in 1993 by Editions Gallimard in the Série Noire collection. Up until now, he has written 25 other books in the themes of romantic fiction, young adult fiction, travel diary and poetry.

His short story Brown Morning published by Cheyne editions in 1998 has achieved international success. With about two million copies sold in France, it was also translated into 25 languages and adapted into an opera in 2007, by composer Bruno Giner.

His last adult novels, published with Albin Michel are the following: The Bridge Ran-Mositar (Albin Michel) Price-France Télévisions in 2005, "The Chapel of Appearances" (2007), "The great exile" (Literary Award for Large spaces, 2009 ), "The man with the bear's shoulders" (released in 2012, Frontier Award Letters in 2013 Readers' Choice Award of Mouans Sartoux in 2013).

== Works ==
=== Novels, short stories ===
- The wind was crazy, Publisher Gallimard, 2334 Black Series No. 1993
- Black heels, Whale Editions, Snapshots collection of Polar 1995
- A hole in the area, Whale Publishing, The Octopus 1995
- Eyes Bee, Whale Editions 1998
- Gare de Lourenço Marques, Whale Editions 1998
- Brown Morning Editions
  - Brown (Acorn Book Company, 2003) ISBN 0954495918.
  - Brown Morning (Univ of Wisconsin Press, 2004) ISBN 0299200744.
- Night wasteland, The Orchard, 2001
- A finger of freedom, Hyphen (Quebec), 2001
- After me, Hiroshima, Gallimard, 2003 ISBN 2070429938, available from Zulma first edition (2002)
- Loincloth sleep Desclée de Brouwer, 2003
- High is the tower, Albin Michel, 2003
- The Silence of the eagles, Alternatives, 2004
- Bridge Ran-Mositar, Albin Michel, 2005
- The Chapel of Appearances, Albin Michel, 2007
- The Great Banishment, Albin Michel, 2009
- Forget me, The Bad Seed, 2010
- Pondicherry, Goa, North Carnets 2010
- The Man in the Bear build, Albin Michel, 2012
- Letters 2013 border price
- The Child margins, Albin Michel, 2014

=== Youth ===
- Pinguino, Publisher Syros, Black Mouse 1994
- Lao Wee and Arusha, Syros (I accuse) 1994
- The squat resists, Syros (black Mouse), 1996
- Menace of the city, Albin Michel, 1998 ISBN 2226091130
- Hostage taking in the sun, Nathan (Black Moon), 2000
- Stopover in Château-Rouge, Milan, 2002
- Until dawn, Bayard (I bouquine), 2004
- Eloa when are we going?, Street World, 2005
- The Fall of the golden eagle, Fleurus 2006
- The Three Gifts, Albin Michel J. (album), 2013

=== Poetry ===
- Prickly gardens, Ricochet, 2000
- Indian exile, Triptych (Quebec), 2001
