= Le Jules Verne =

Parisian restaurant

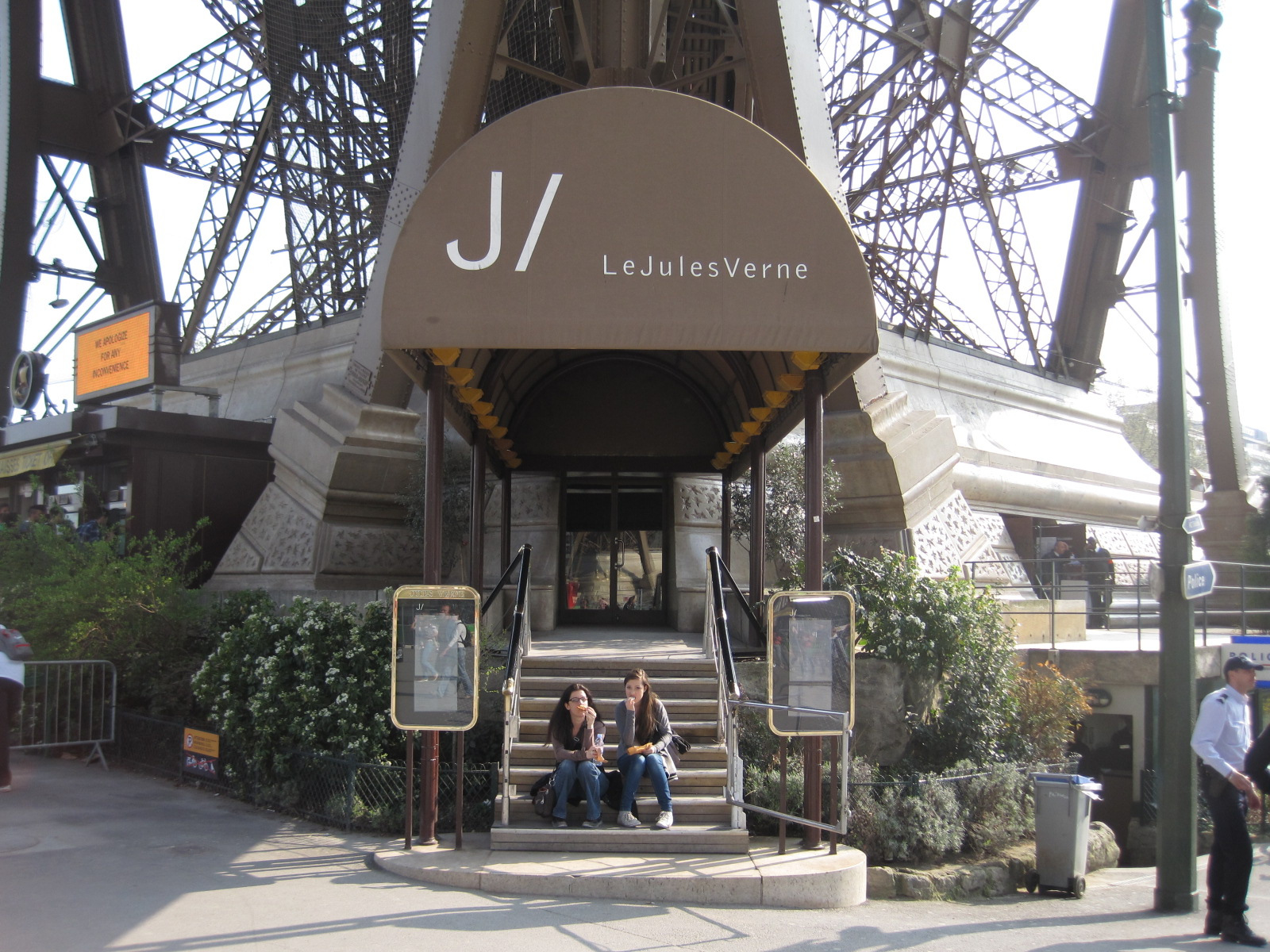
- The entry to the elevator to the Le Jules Verne at the 2nd floor of the Eiffel Tower

- Location within Paris

Restaurant information
- Chef: Frédéric Anton
- Food type: French cuisine
- Rating: (Michelin Guide)
- Location: Eiffel Tower, southern pillar, Paris, France
- Coordinates: 48°52′08″N 2°20′04″E
- Website: www.lejulesverne-paris.com/fr

Le Jules Verne is a restaurant located on the second floor of the Eiffel Tower in the 7th arrondissement of Paris, France.

== History ==
Since 2019, Le Jule Verne's cuisine has been led by chef Frédéric Anton, who succeeded Louis Grondard (1983), Alain Reix (1992) and Alain Ducasse (2007). All these chefs were awarded a Michelin Guide star in the restaurant.

Louis Vaudable, who used to be the owner of Le Jules Verne, now owns Maxim's in the 8th arrondissement.

The interior was designed by Aline Asmar d'Amman.

On July 13, 2017, Le Jules Vernes received the French and American presidential couples (Brigitte and Emmanuel Macron; Melania and Donald Trump) for a dinner.

After restoration works that lasted several months, the restaurant was reopened on July 20, 2019. On January 27, 2020, the restaurant received a Michelin Star. On March 18, 2024, the restaurant received a second star.

== See also ==
- List of Michelin-starred restaurants in Paris
