= Yves Camdeborde =

French chef

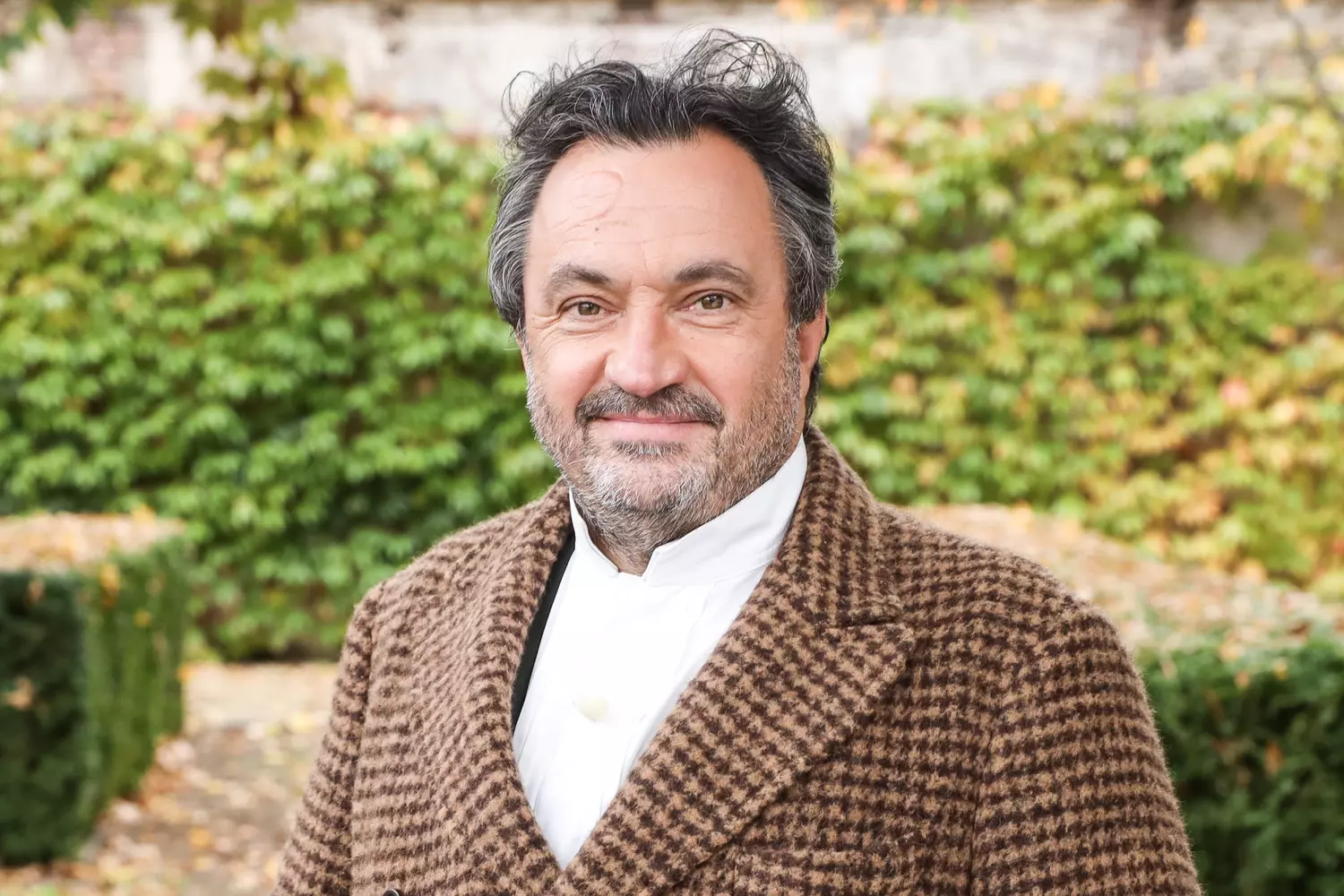
- Born: 7 December 1964 (age 60); Pau, Pyrénées-Atlantiques, France
- Culinary career
- Current restaurant(s): Le Comptoir du Relais Saint-Germain (Paris)
- Previous restaurant(s): La Régalade (Paris)
- Television show(s): MasterChef (France)
- Website: www.hotel-paris-relais-saint-germain.com

Yves Camdeborde (born 7 December 1964) is a French chef. He specializes in bistro cuisine. Journalists call him the chef of "bistronomy" (a portmanteau of the words bistro and gastronomy).

== Professional career ==
He left school at 14 to become a cooking assistant. After obtaining his CAP (Certificat d'Aptitude Professionnelle), he continued his training in Paris at the Ritz, the restaurant La Marée, then the restaurant La Tour d'Argent and the Hôtel de Crillon. In 1992, he acquired the restaurant La Régalade in the 14th arrondissement of Paris. In 2005, he bought a hotel at the Quartier de l'Odéon and founded Le Comptoir du Relais Saint-Germain.

== MasterChef ==
Since 2010, he has been a member of the jury in the French version of MasterChef with journalist and food critic Sébastien Demorand, chefs Frédéric Anton and Amandine Chaignot (since 2013). He announced on 30 November 2013 on Sud Radio, that he will not participate in the fifth season in 2014.

== Books ==
- Yves Camdeborde, Les bécasses rôties, poêlée de cèpes à l'ail, Gérard Guy (2003)
- Yves Camdeborde, 125 recettes de la Régalade, Robert Laffont, collection Table ouverte (2003) ISBN 2221101030
- Yves Camdeborde, Thierry Faucher, Thierry Breton, Rodolphe Paquin, Qu'est-ce qu'on mange ce soir ? : 130 menus faciles et rapides à préparer à l'avance, Robert Laffont (2003) ISBN 283070732X
- Sylvia Gabet, Yves Camdeborde, Thierry Faucher, Thierry Breton, Rodolphe Paquin, Restez à table : Avec vos amis !, Robert Laffont (2004) ISBN 283070777X
- Dominique Lacout, Yves Camdeborde, La Bible des Gourmets : Plus de 3000 adresses où trouver les meilleurs produits, Belles Lettres (2005) ISBN 2251790365
- Yves Camdeborde, Sébastien Lapaque, Room service, Actes Sud (2006) ISBN 2742760253
- Yves Camdeborde, Sébastien Lapaque, Des Tripes et des Lettres, Les Éditions de l'Epure (2007) ISBN 2352550327
- Yves Camdeborde, Simplement Bistrot : Des recettes pour tous les jours, Robert Laffont (2008) ISBN 2749909260
