= The New Parisienne =

2020 book by Lindsey Tramuta

- Author: Lindsey Tramuta
- Language: English
- Publisher: Abrams Books
- ISBN: 9781683358787

The New Parisienne: The Women & Ideas Shaping Paris is a 2020 non-fiction book written by New York Times journalist Lindsey Tramuta and with photography by Joann Pai. It was originally slated to release in April 2020, but was pushed to July later that year due to the COVID-19 pandemic and the murder of George Floyd. It features profiles of 40 Parisian women, including activists, writers, and chefs.

== Summary ==
The summary from Abrams Books is:

Lifting the veil on the mythologized Parisian woman—white, lithe, ever fashionable—Lindsey Tramuta demystifies this oversimplified archetype and recasts the women of Paris as they truly are, in all their complexity. Featuring 50 activists, creators, educators, visionaries, and disruptors the book reveals Paris as a blossoming cultural center of feminine power. Both the featured women and Tramuta herself offer up favorite destinations and women-owned businesses, including beloved shops, artistic venues, bistros, and more. The New Parisienne showcases "Parisianness" in all its multiplicity, highlighting those who are bucking tradition, making names for themselves, and transforming the city.

== Book contents ==
The book is divided up into seven sections:

The Activists

- Lauren Bastide: journalist & podcaster
- Elisa Rojas: lawyer & disability-rights activist
- Rokhaya Diallo: journalist, filmmaker & antiracist activist
- Rebecca Amsellem: author & creator of Les Glorieuses
- Clémence Zamora Cruz: Inter-LGBT spokesperson & trans activist

The Creators

- Aline Asmar D'Amman: architect & designer
- Elena Rossini: filmmaker & cinematographer
- Inna Modja: singer-songwriter
- Amélie Viaene: fine jewelry designer
- Ajiri Aki: founder of Madame de la Maison
- Victoire de Taillac: cofounder of L'Officine Universelle Buly

The Disruptors

- Anne Hidalgo: first female mayor of Paris
- Christelle Delarue: CEO, Mad&Women advertising agency
- Delphine Dijoud: aeronautical engineer
- Sarah Zouak: social entrepreneur, filmmaker & cofounder of Lallab
- Delphine Horvilleur: rabbi & author
- Dr. Ghada Hatem-Gantzer: Ob-gyn & founder of La Maison des Femmes
- Sarah Ourahmoune: Olympic-medalist boxer & entrepreneur

The Storytellers

- Ariane Bernard: former head of digital at Le Parisien
- Heidi Evans: creator of Women of Paris tours
- Leïla Slimani: Goncourt Prize-winning author
- Sarah Sauquet: teacher & creator of Un Texte Un Jour
- Nathalie Miltat: art gallery owner
- Poonam Chawla: cultural guide, author & translator

The "Taste"makers

- Mihaela Iordache: coffee roaster
- Muriel Tallandier: publisher & cofounder of Fou de Pâtisserie boutique
- Julie Mathieu: editor in chief & co-owner of Fou de Pâtisserie magazine & boutique
- Myriam Sabet: pastry chef & founder of Maison Aleph
- Margot Lecarpentier: cofounder of Combat cocktail bar
- Moko Hirayama: baker & co-owner of Mokonuts

The Visionaries

- Alice Cabaret: urban strategist & founder of The Street Society
- Rahaf Harfoush: digital anthropologist & author
- Sandra Rey: designer in bioluminescence & CEO of Glowee
- Kat Borlongan: director of La French Tech
- Nida Januskis: associate dean of advancement for INSEAD
- Anne Ravanona: founder of Global Invest Her

Their Paris

- Sarah Andelman: cofounder of Colette & Just an Idea
- Eliane Cheung: illustrator-author
- Benedicte Reitzel-Nielsen: cofounder of the #SeeMyParis community
- Céline Pham: itinerant chef cofounder of Tontine
- Emilie Franzo: food photographer cookbook author
