= C'est Canteloup =

French satirical TV show

- Genre: News satire
- Presented by: Nicolas Canteloup; Alessandra Sublet
- Country of origin: France

Production
- Running time: 7 minutes

Original release
- Network: TF1
- Release: Since 10 October 2011

C'est Canteloup (originally called Après le 20H, c'est Canteloup) is a French satirical TV show presented by Nicolas Canteloup and Alessandra Sublet (since 2018), preceded by Nikos Aliagas (until 2018).

"C'est Canteloup" is a French television show that falls under the category of political satire and humor. The title is a play on words, combining the name of Nicolas Canteloup, a French comedian and impersonator, with the French phrase "c'est un coup à le tuer" (meaning "it's enough to kill him").

The show typically features Nicolas Canteloup's comedic impressions of various public figures, especially political personalities. He uses his talent for mimicry to satirize politicians, celebrities, and other prominent figures in a humorous and entertaining manner. The humor often revolves around current events, political developments, and societal issues.

The show was discontinued in June of 2025.
