= Amandine Chaignot =

French chef (born 1979)

- Born: 1 May 1979 (age 47); Orsay, Essonne, France
- Occupation: Cooking chef
- Employer: Hôtel Raphaël (Paris)
- Television: MasterChef (TF1)
- Website: amandinechaignot.com

Amandine Chaignot (French: [amɑ̃din ʃɛɲo]; born 1 May 1979) is a French chef.

== Early life and education ==
The daughter of a scientist, Amandine was an excellent student, first in her class, who obtained her high school final exam one year in advance. In 1996, she began studying in pharmacy at the Faculté de Pharmacie but quit in 1998 and reoriented herself in culinary training.

== Professional career ==
She began working as a waitress in a pizzeria. She later opened a tearoom and then registered at the École Grégoire-Ferrandi. She did her training course at the Maison de l'Aubrac and then at Prune (one macaron at the Michelin), where she was chosen as a chef assistant to participate at the Bocuse d'Or.

She worked for three years at the Plaza Athénée with Jean-François Piège and at The Ritz Hotel in London. She then worked for three years with Éric Fréchon. She pursued working at the Hôtel Meurice with Yannick Alléno and later at the Hôtel de Crillon for two years. She is currently the chef of the restaurant Pouliche in Paris.

== MasterChef ==
Since September 2013, she has been a member of the jury in the fourth season of the French version of MasterChef with chefs Frédéric Anton, Yves Camdeborde and journalist Sébastien Demorand. She also appeared as a guest in the previous season in 2012.
