= Crépol =

Crépol Crèpôl (Arpitan)
- Commune
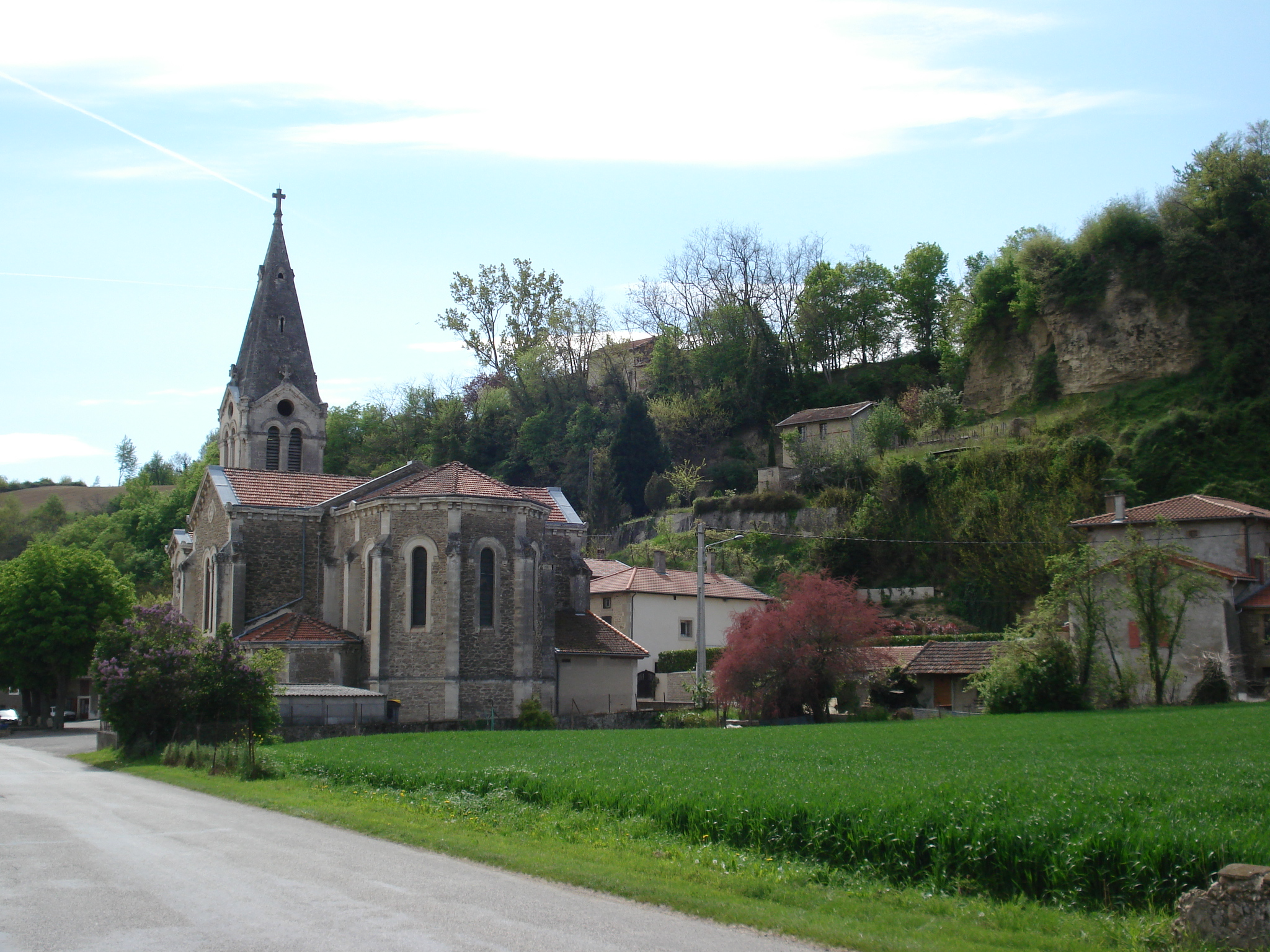
- The church in Crépol
- Location of Crépol
- Location within France Location within Auvergne-Rhône-Alpes
- Coordinates: 45°10′31″N 5°04′16″E
- Country: France
- Region: Auvergne-Rhône-Alpes
- Department: Drôme
- Arrondissement: Valence
- Canton: Drôme des collines
- Intercommunality: CA Valence Romans Agglo

Government
  - Mayor (2020–2026): Martine Lagut
- Area^{1}: 11.42 km^{2} (4.41 sq mi)
- Elevation: 298 m (978 ft)
- Highest elevation: 491 m (1,611 ft)
- Lowest elevation: 260 m (850 ft)
- Population (2023): 523
  - Density: 45.8/km^{2} (119/sq mi)
- Demonym: Crépolois
- Time zone: UTC+01:00 (CET)
  - Summer (DST): UTC+02:00 (CEST)
- INSEE/Postal code: 26107 /26350
- Website: crepol.fr
- ^{1} French Land Register data, which excludes lakes, ponds, glaciers > 1 km^{2} (0.386 sq mi or 247 acres) and river estuaries.

Crépol (French pronunciation: [kʁepɔl]; Arpitan: Crèpôl) is a rural commune in the southeastern Drôme department in the Auvergne-Rhône-Alpes region in France. It is located northwest of Valence, not far from the departmental border with Isère, in the Dauphiné historical region.

In 2023, it was the scene of the Crépol stabbing, which received international news coverage.

== Demographics ==
Historical population
Year	Pop.	±% p.a.
1968	430	—
1975	341	−3.26%
1982	374	+1.33%
1990	424	+1.58%
1999	470	+1.15%
2007	476	+0.16%
2012	552	+3.01%
2017	563	+0.40%
2023	523	−1.22%
Source: INSEE

== See also ==
- Communes of the Drôme department
