= C à vous =

French talk show

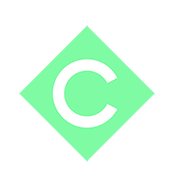
Logo of the 7th season of C à vous

C à vous (French: [se a vu]) is a French TV show hosted by Anne-Elisabeth Lemoine that has been broadcast on the channel France 5 since 7 September 2009. The name is a pun on the French expression "C'est à vous" (in English, roughly, "The floor is yours"). The show is shot in an informal format in a Parisian loft. Lemoine and her columnists discuss current affairs with guest(s) of the day around a table, while a chef (occasionally a famous chef) prepares a dish for them to enjoy. The show airs Monday to Friday at 7 p.m.

== History ==
The TV show C à vous was created in September 2009 and was presented by Alessandra Sublet until June 2013.

A new segment called C à vous la suite (C à vous Continued), the next part of the show, has been broadcast since August 2010. This segment lasts around 12 minutes and introduces a dessert guest, who joins the dinner guest(s). It usually ends with a live song. From August 2010 to May 2013, it was broadcast at 8.25 p.m. Since June 2013, it has been broadcast at 8 p.m. after the main show, following a short advertising break.

Since September 2010 a selection of the best moments chosen from that week's shows has been broadcast every Saturday. It is called, C à vous, le meilleur (The best of C à vous). The scheduling of this Saturday show has changed several times. It was broadcast at 12.30 p.m. from September 2010 then at 5.55 p.m. from September 2011, at 7 p.m. from September 2013, then back at 12.30 p.m. and finally at 1 p.m. in 2014.

C à vous celebrated its 500th show in February 2012. For this occasion the guests of honor were Bruce Toussaint and Jean-Pierre Pernaut, two ex-bosses of Alessandra Sublet, who by that time was the presenter of the show. This special show was watched by 1.1 million viewers and produced 5.1% viewer share.

Anne-Sophie Lapix hosted the show from 2013 to 2017 and Anne-Élisabeth Lemoine, assisted by Patrick Cohen since then.

=== 2024 editorial controversy ===
On 14 February 2024, the Regulatory Authority for Audiovisual and Digital Communication issued a formal citation against France 5 as a result of a complaint over an editorial about the death of Thomas Perotto that was broadcast on the 27 November 2023 edition of C à vous. Patrick Cohen, who had presided over the editorial, had been accused of presenting information about the attacks that led to Perotto's death from the perpetrators' perspective, even though it had not yet been clarified by investigators. The authority determined that the remarks that were made during the editorial did not meet the standards and practices of France Télévisions.
