= Alessandra Sublet =

French radio and television presenter (born 1976)

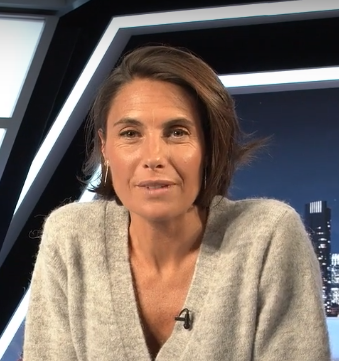
- Alessandra Sublet in 2020.
- Born: Alexandra Sublet; October 5, 1976 (age 50); Lyon, France
- Occupations: Radio presenter, television presenter
- Years active: Since 1997
- Notable credit(s): La France a un incroyable talent C à vous Un soir à la Tour Eiffel; Action ou Vérité; C'est Canteloup
- Television: M6 (2006–09); Canal+ (2004–06); France 5 (2009–15); France 2 (2010–15); TF1 (2003–04, 2015–)
- Height: 5 ft 3 in (1.60 m)

Alessandra Sublet (born Alexandra Sublet; (Note: Her parents gave her the name Alessandra because of her Italian origins but the employee of the vital records never wanted to register the choice of that spelling.) 5 October 1976) is a French radio and television presenter. She hosted the daily television program C à vous from September 2009 to June 2013 on France 5.

== Early life and education ==
Alessandra Sublet was born in Lyon, the daughter of Joël Sublet, a former soccer player of the Olympique Lyonnais in the 1970s. She is the cousin of soccer player Willy Sagnol. As a child, she prepared a sport studying course in classical dance at the Alain Astié school of Lyon and attempted to join the Opéra de Paris but was rejected because of her height (1.60 m). After obtaining her baccalauréat, she studied communications and audiovisual at the ISCPA of Lyon.

== Television career ==
Alessandra Sublet began her television career in 2003, working for a year for Match TV as a columnist in J'y étais and for TF1 as a columnist for the program Combien ça coûte ?. She was also a columnist for La Matinale on Canal+ from 2004 to 2006. From September 2007 to June 2008, she co-hosted Le Grand Morning on RTL2.

She joined the channel M6 in 2006. In September, she replaced Virginie Efira to host the program Classé Confidentiel. In November 2006, 2007 and 2008, she hosted the three first seasons of La France a un incroyable talent. In December 2006, she hosted the second season of L'amour est dans le pré (French version of Farmer Wants a Wife), replacing Véronique Mounier while she was pregnant. In 2007, she hosted Nouvelle Star, ça continue, a follow-up of the program Nouvelle Star from M6 broadcast during the second part of the evening on W9, another channel of the same group. In August 2008, she participated at an advertisement for the perfume Magnifique, a new fragrance of Lancôme, broadcast live on M6 from the Musée Rodin.

She left M6 in June 2009 to join the channel group France Télévisions. In September 2009, she began hosting the daily television program C à vous on France 5. She co-hosted in December 2009 on France 2 a show from the Telethon with Cyril Hanouna. In January 2010, she co-hosted with other presenters from France Télévisions a show dedicated to help the victims of the 2010 Haiti earthquake broadcast on France 2.

In April 2011, she hosted Les grandes voix du Sidaction during the first part of the evening on France 2. In May 2012, she was replaced for hosting C à vous due to maternity leave. She hosted again in September 2012, but announced in May 2013 that she will not host the next season. She has been replaced by Anne-Sophie Lapix. Since September 2013, she presents Fais-moi une place on France 5, a monthly program in which celebrities present a place where they like to spend their time.

Since January 2014, she presents on France 2 the variety program Tenue de soirée exigée. The first broadcast was dedicated to crooners, American charm singers. She started presenting in October 2014 the talk show Un soir à la Tour Eiffel on the second part of Wednesday evening, where she receives guests on a stage located on the second floor of the Eiffel Tower. The broadcast of the program ended in June 2015.

She arrives on TF1 in September 2015 to present entertainment programs in prime and develop new formats, where she will host Stars à domicile, a program that had already been presented on the same channel by Flavie Flament from February 2001 to April 2004. She began hosting on December 4, 2015 on TF1 an anniversary concert to celebrate the 30 years of the AccorHotels Arena (formerly Bercy Arena) where more than 50 singers were invited to perform live.

She co-hosts on January 8, 2016 the program La Grande Histoire de la Télévision - les 40 ans de l'Ina, produced by Arthur, where she retraces 40 years of television through pictures of archives in company of about twenty television presenters of all generations. Since March 2016, she presents on TF1 a new talk show entitled Action ou Vérité. She then hosts on 9 June 2016 the opening of the UEFA Euro 2016 in direct from the Champ de Mars with famous French and international celebrities.

Since 2018, she presents the French talk show C'est Canteloup with Nicolas Canteloup.

== Radio career ==
Alessandra Sublet began a career in radio on Nostalgie in 1997 before joining the channel MTV in New York City. On her return to France, she joined Radio Nova in 2000 and FG DJ Radio in 2003.

In September 2010, she joined the radio France Inter to present a weekly program on Sunday morning titled Je hais les dimanches. In February 2011, she left France Inter for a full-time career in television.

In September 2014, she arrives on Europe 1 to host a program every Sunday in the late morning titled Petit dimanche entre amis. One year later, she left the radio station to focus on hosting programs on France Télévisions.

== Personal life ==
Sublet married in April 2008 before separating in June 2009. She gave birth to a girl named Charlie on 28 June 2012 from her relationship with Clément Miserez, a film and television producer. They married the same year. She gave birth to her second child in August 2014, a boy named Alphonse.

Alessandra Sublet is also well known for her short haircut. She has stated herself that she has never felt comfortable with long hair and that her short haircut was a way to impose herself. She also added that she feels much better with short hair and that it suits her perfectly.

== Bibliography ==
- Flammarion, ed. (2013). T'as le blues baby ? (in French). p. 190. ISBN 9782277010265.
