= Ensemble Aleph =

French musical ensemble

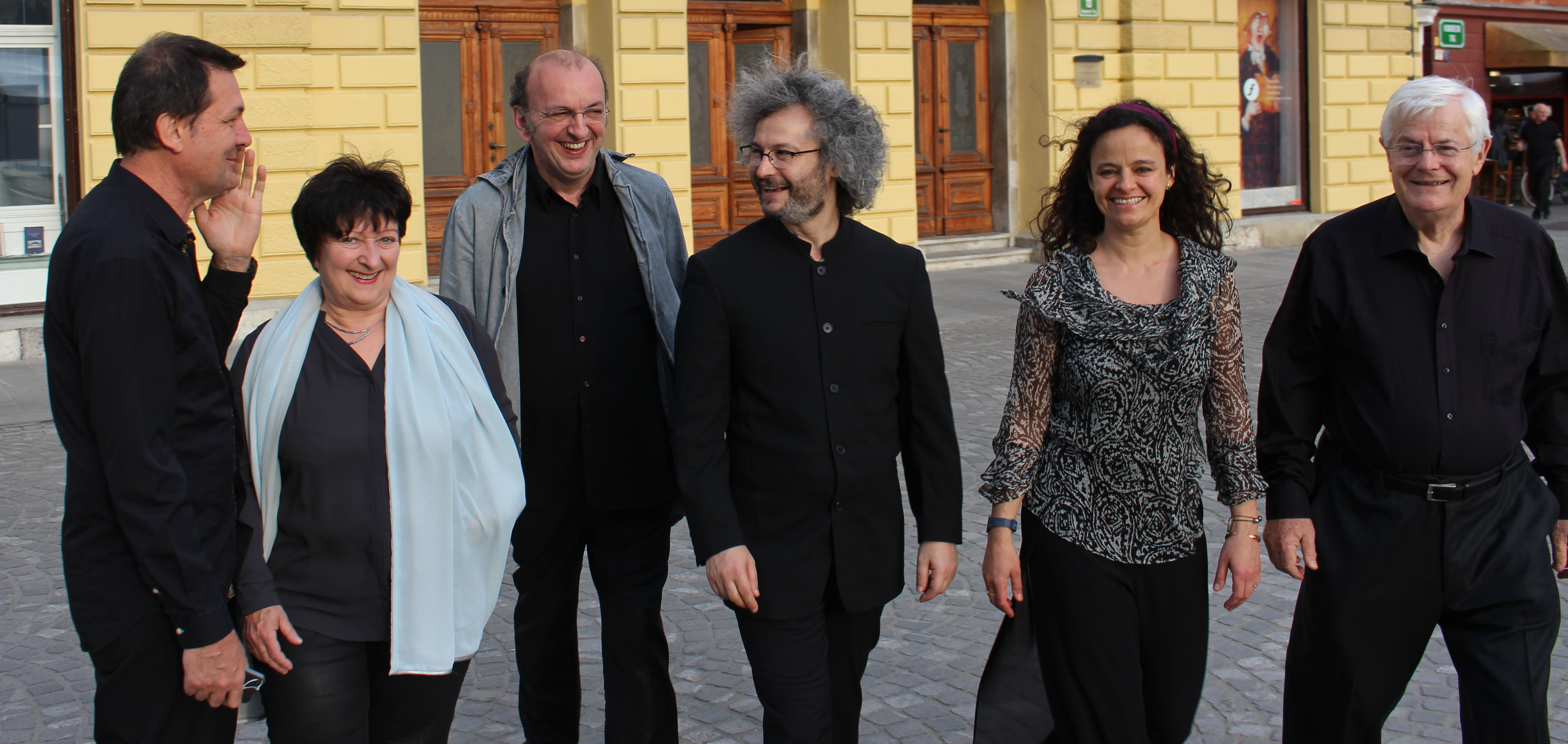
The Ensemble Aleph at the Slowind Festival of Ljubljana (2015).

The Ensemble Aleph is a French musical ensemble composed of performing musicians and composers created in 1983.

The members of this collective are currently: Dominique Clément - clarinet, Sylvie Drouin - piano, Jean-Charles François - percussion, Monica Jordan - voice, Christophe Roy - cello, Noëmi Schindler - violin and Michel Pozmanter - conductor.

== History ==
Since its creation, the Ensemble Aleph has been developing collective projects and sharing musical techniques and practices with young and varied audiences, notably within the framework of the International Forum of Young Composers (project selected in 2000 by the European Commission "Culture 2000 Programme", with 61 composers from 26 countries - 7th Forum in 2014). In 2008, the Ensemble created the LIEU, Laboratoire Instrumental Européen, which brings together international musicians, ensembles and composers around musical creation. This programme was named "Live In Lieu" in 2013.

== Selected discography ==
- Mauricio Kagel: La Rose des vents (2015/2016, 2CDs Evidence Classics EVCD030). OCLC 1005721479
