= Frédéric Anton =

French chef

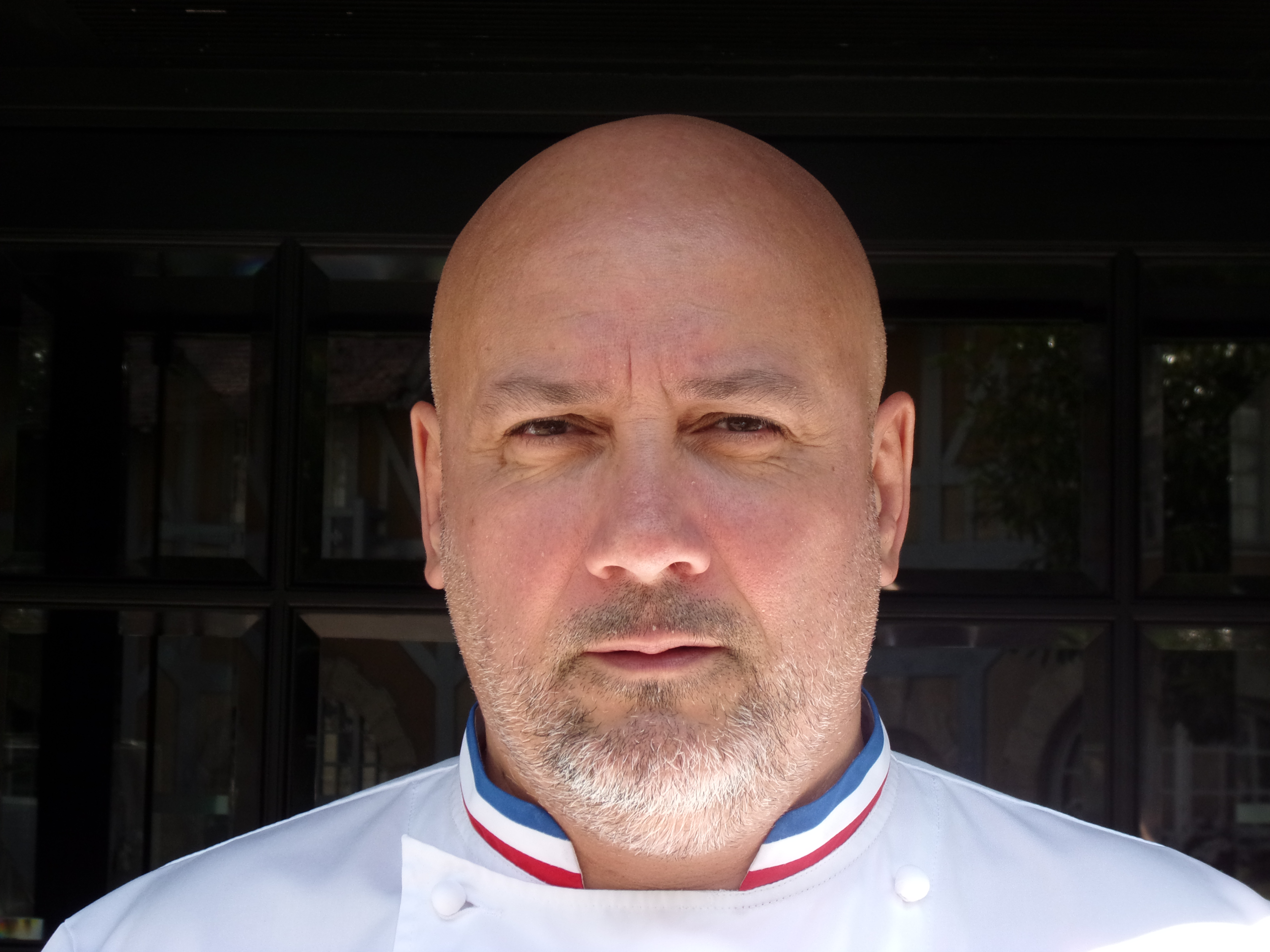
- Frédéric Anton in 2019.
- Born: 15 October 1964 (age 62); Nancy, Meurthe-et-Moselle, France
- Culinary career
- Rating
- Michelin stars
- Current restaurants
- Le Pré Catelan (Paris); Le Jules Verne (Paris)
- Television show
- MasterChef (France)
- Website: restaurant-precatelan.com precatelanparis.com

Frédéric Anton (French pronunciation: [fʁedeʁik ɑ̃tɔ̃], born 15 October 1964) is a French chef, Meilleur Ouvrier de France and three stars at the Guide Michelin since 2007. He is the chef of Parisian restaurants Le Pré Catelan (within the Bois de Boulogne) and Le Jules Verne (in the Eiffel Tower).

== Life and career ==
Frédéric Anton was born in Nancy but grew up in Contrexéville in the department of Vosges. He started his training course at the high school of Gérardmer in the same department.

His career began in 1984 with Gérard Veissiere at the Capucin Gourmand, a famous restaurant located in Nancy, and then in 1986 in Lille, where he worked with Robert Bardot. He then worked with chef Gérard Boyer at the Château des Crayères in Reims.

From 1988 to 1996, he worked for 7 years with chef Joël Robuchon at Jamin and avenue Raymond Poincaré in the 16th arrondissement of Paris, where he became the chef.

In 1997, the group Lenôtre gave him access to the restaurant Le Pré Catelan, a Napoléon III style restaurant owned by the famous pastry chef Gaston Lenôtre with a Belle Époque style dining room. The restaurant is located in route de Suresnes at the Bois de Boulogne.

In 1999, he obtained two Michelin stars and became Meilleur Ouvrier de France in 2000. In 2007, he received at age 43 his third Michelin star.

In 2011, he was also a judge in an episode of the Belgian show Comme un chef, on RTBF.

In 2018, in partnership with Sodexo, he took over the restaurant Le Jules Verne, located on the second floor of the Eiffel Tower.

On 13 February 2019 he appeared during an episode of season 10 of Top Chef.

In 2020, he won a first star for his Parisian restaurant Le Jules Verne, only 6 months after its opening.

At the end of 2024, he was named Chef of the Year 2025 by the Gault et Millau guide.

== MasterChef ==
Since 2010, he is a member of the jury in the French version of MasterChef with chef Yves Camdeborde, journalist Sébastien Demorand, and Amandine Chaignot since 2013.

== Honours ==
- 2000 : Meilleur Ouvrier de France
- 2007 : Three stars at the Guide Michelin
- 2011 : Chevalier (Knight) of the Legion of Honour

== Books ==
- Frédéric Anton, Chihiro Masui (illustrations : Richard Haughton), Anton : le Pré Catelan, Glénat, 2008, 351 pages (ISBN 9782723466950)
- Frédéric Anton, Christelle Brua, Chihiro Masui (illustrations : Richard Haughton), Petits gâteaux, Chêne, 2011, 288 pages (ISBN 9782812304859)
- Frédéric Anton, Christelle Brua, Chihiro Masui (illustrations : Richard Haughton), Pommes de terre, Chêne, 2012, 288 pages (ISBN 9782812306778)
- Frédéric Anton, Christelle Brua, Chihiro Masui (illustrations : Richard Haughton), Tartes, Chêne, 2013, 288 pages (ISBN 9782812306785)

== See also ==
- List of Michelin starred restaurants
