= Hazmieh =

City in Mount Lebanon Governorate, Lebanon

Coordinates: 33°51′04″N 35°32′29″E

Hazmieh (Levantine Arabic: حازمية, romanized: al-Ḥāzimīyeh; also romanized as Hazmiyé, Hazmie, Hazmiyeh, Hasmiyeh, Al Ḩāzimīyah, and El Hâzmîyé) is a city in Mount Lebanon Governorate of Lebanon, and a suburb of Beirut, part of Greater Beirut.

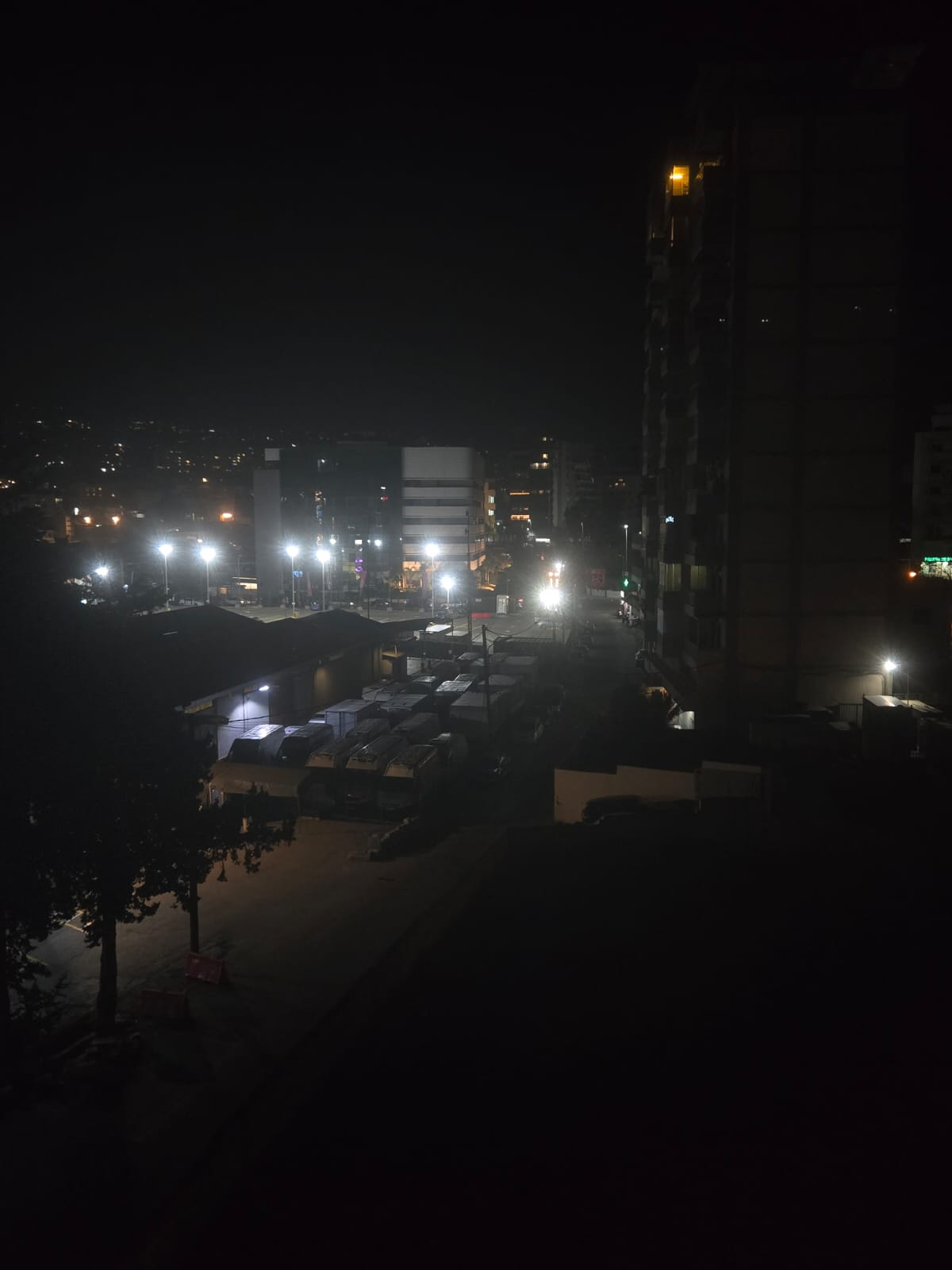
View of Mount Lebanon Hospital University Medical Center in Hazmieh from apartment w. City Centre next to it.

== Geography ==
Hazmieh covers an area of 2.73 square kilometers directly southeast of Beirut, at an elevation of between 50 and 200 meters above sea level. Its borders are defined by the Beirut River and Sin El Fil Boulevard to the north, Camille Chamoun Boulevard to the west, by El Sayad Roundabout and Rihaniyya Junction to the south, and a military school to the east.

== History ==
Hazmieh, along with other suburbs to the east of Beirut, has historically been a predominantly Christian area.

For eighty-six years Hazmieh was the location of the Ashfuriyyeh mental hospital. Founded in 1896 by Theophilus Waldmeier, Ashfuriyeh was the first hospital in the Near East dedicated to the treatment of mentally ill patients. Waldmeier was influenced by the thinking of Daniel Tuke and the example of The Retreat hospital in York.

In 2002, Elie Hobeika was assassinated along with three bodyguards in an explosion in Hazmieh. Hobeika had commanded troops in the Lebanese Civil War. Another bombing in 2008 killed Wissam Eid, a Lebanese intelligence official, who had been investigating militant groups in the country.

== Economy ==
Hazmieh hosts a variety of businesses and commercial establishments, contributing to its reputation as a local hub for commerce and services. The area has experienced notable urban development and is recognized for its mix of residential neighborhoods and commercial districts, supporting its role as a business center within the greater Beirut metropolitan area.

== Name ==
According to Anis Freiha in his book Names of Lebanese Cities and Villages, the name Hazmieh comes from two Aramaic words: "haza" which translates as "watch," "monitor," or "observe"; and "mayya," which translates to "water" - he speculates the name refers to a guardian of water. Less credited resources attributed the name to other sources:

- The words Hazmieh may come from the Arabic root "Hazm" (حزم), which means "corral," because it was a meeting point for caravans heading into the mountains.
- It refers to an unknown prince named Hazem (حازم)
- It has Syriac roots from two words: "Haza," meaning deep; and "Mayya," meaning water, since there are springs in the vicinity.

== Notable people ==
Élias Sarkis, former Lebanese president

Aline Asmar d'Amman, leading architect in France and Lebanon, was born here in 1975.

Sabah, singer and actress

Samira Tewfik, singer

Wadih El Safi, singer and actor

Walid Toufic, singer
