= Nicolas Canteloup =

French impressionist

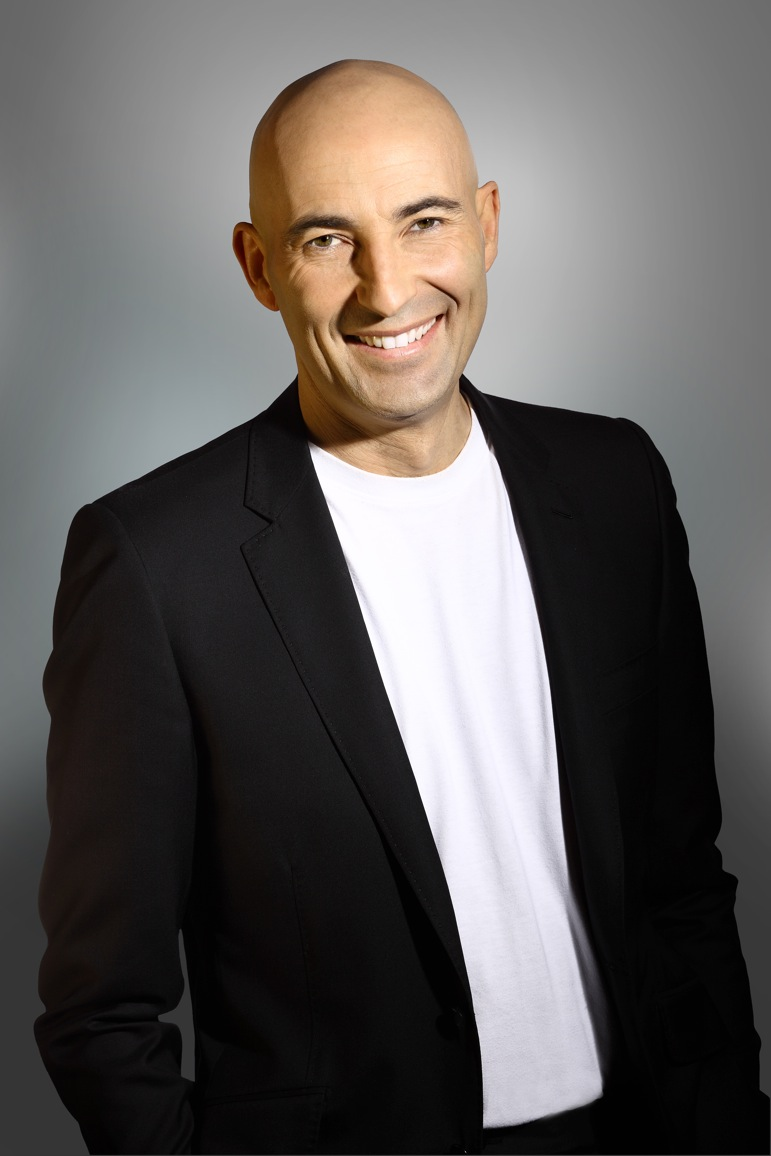
- Canteloup in 2013
- Born: 4 November 1963 (age 62); Mérignac, France
- Occupation: Comedian
- Children: Anouk Canteloup

Nicolas Canteloup (born 4 November 1963) is a French comedian and impressionist. He began his career as a host at Club Med in the early 1990s, later transitioning into radio and television. Known for his impersonations, Canteloup gained prominence through appearances on French television shows such as Les Guignols de l'info and C'est Canteloup.

== Biography ==
=== Early life and career ===
Canteloup was born in Mérignac, Gironde. He studied at Fernand Daguin High School before attending the UCPA center in Segonzac, Corrèze, where he earned a horse-riding instructor certification. During this time, he started performing imitations for friends and neighbors. In 1991, he joined Club Med in Pompadour as a "Gentil Organisateur" (G.O.), working in entertainment.

He is a graduate of the l'École nationale d'équitation de Saumur and remains an avid equestrian.

=== 1995–2011 ===
From 1995 to 2011, Canteloup provided voice impressions for the satirical puppet show Les Guignols de l'info on Canal+, impersonating over forty personalities. His television debut came on Drôle de scène in 2001. He later appeared regularly on Michel Drucker's Vivement dimanche prochain on France 2. He performed live shows, including appearances at the Olympia in Paris.

Starting in 2005, he became a regular on Europe 1's morning show with La Revue de presque. The sketches were written by Philippe Caverivière, Laurent Vassilian, and Arnaud Demanche, and produced by Jean-Marc Dumontet.

=== 2010s ===
Canteloup gained his own television show, Après le 20H c'est Canteloup, on TF1 in 2011, co-hosted with Nikos Aliagas. The show satirized current events. Despite a contract dispute with Canal+, the show was a success and was rebranded as C'est Canteloup in 2013.

In 2012, he joined the charity music group Les Enfoirés.

In 2017, he faced criticism for a controversial sketch perceived as homophobic, for which he later apologized.

=== 2020s ===
On 22 July 2021, Jean-Marc Dumontet announced Canteloup's departure from Europe 1 after 16 years. His exit was speculated to be linked to changes in the station's management following the arrival of media mogul Vincent Bolloré.

Despite this, C'est Canteloup continued airing into its 13th season in 2023–2024.

=== Equestrian ===
In 2016, Canteloup became vice-champion of France in eventing for competitors over 40 years old.

== Awards and honors ==
- Ordre des Arts et des Lettres (2007)

== Selected works ==
=== Stage shows ===
- 2001: Tous des guignols
- 2002: Méfiez-vous des imitations
- 2004–2005: Nicolas Canteloup au palais des glaces
- 2008–2010: Deuxième Couche
- 2011–2013: Nicolas Canteloup n'arrête jamais

=== Television ===
- 2020: I Love You Coiffure (TV film by Muriel Robin) – role: Mr. Pralon
