= Nicolas Demorand =

French journalist (born 1971)

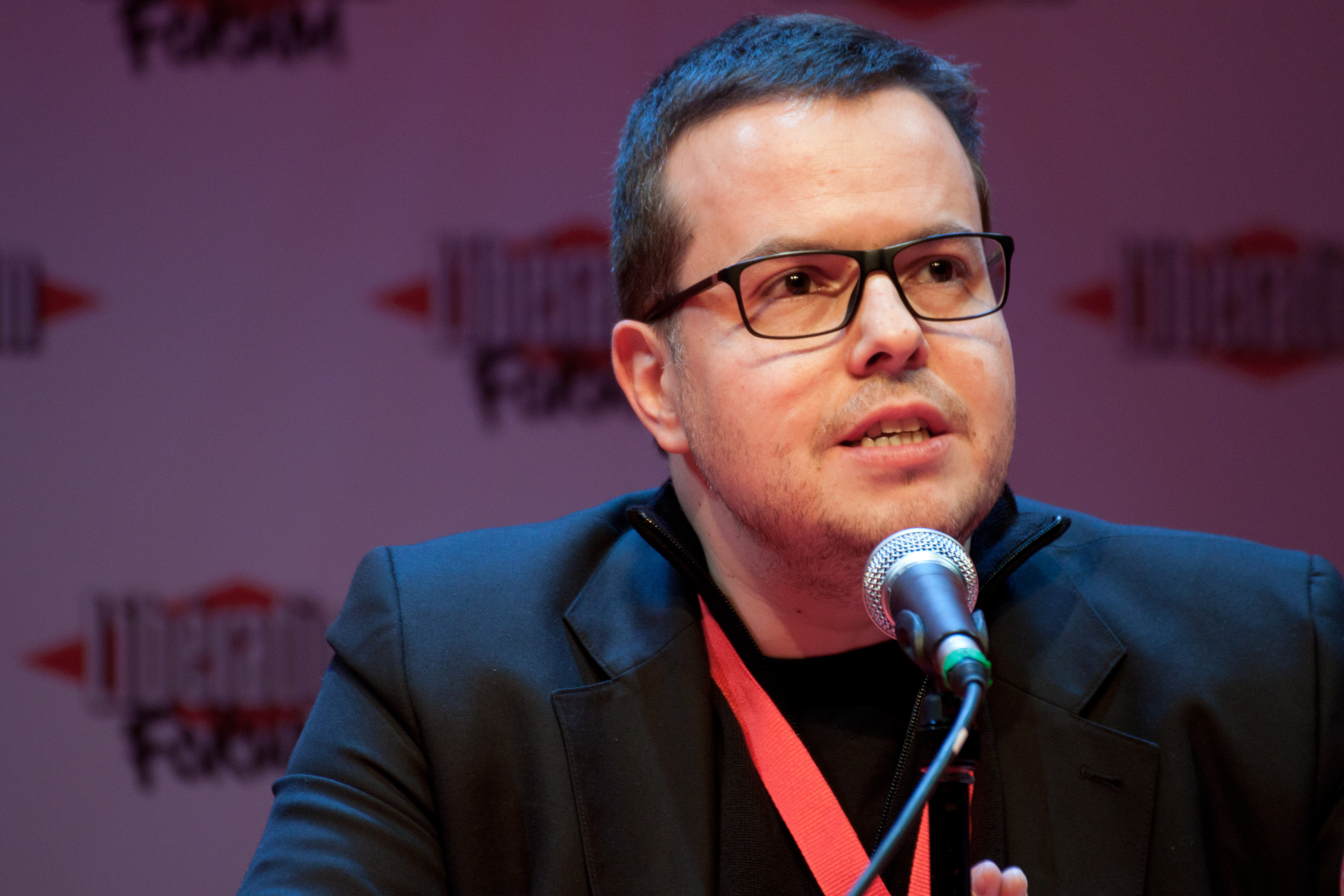
- Demorand in 2012
- Born: 5 May 1971 (age 55); Vancouver, British Columbia, Canada
- Education: Lycée Henri-IV; ENS Fontenay-Saint-Cloud
- Occupation: Journalist
- Employer: France Inter

Nicolas Demorand (born 5 May 1971) is a French journalist who works as a producer, host and editor of French public radio station France Inter. He was the executive editor of French daily newspaper Libération from 2011 to 2014. Since 2017, he has co-hosted Le 7/10, France Inter's morning show, with Léa Salamé until June 2025 and then with Benjamin Duhamel. He previously worked for France Culture, Europe 1, and I-Télé.

== Early life ==
Demorand was born on 5 May 1971, in Vancouver, British Columbia. He is the son of Jacques Demorand, former chief of staff of Secretary of State Roland Dumas and Jewish pied-noir Jacqueline Bouaniche. He is the younger brother of late food critic Sébastien Demorand and Catherine Demorand, a visual artist.

Demorand has lived in Canada, the United States, Japan, Belgium, and Morocco. He studied in Tokyo, Brussels, Rabat (Lycée Descartes) and Sceaux (Lycée Lakanal).

Winner of the French general competition and former student of the École normale supérieure de Fontenay-Saint-Cloud, Demorand has a degree in philosophy and is an agrégé in modern literature. He has also been a teacher at a vocational high school in Cergy and in preparatory classes for the grandes écoles.

== Career ==
=== 1997–2006: France Culture ===
After working as a food critic and freelance journalist for Les Inrockuptibles, Demorand joined France Culture in 1997, contributing to Antoine Spire's Staccato and then Sylvain Bourmeau's La Suite dans les idées before producing Cas d'école.

From September 2002, he was the presenter of the station's morning show, Les Matins de France Culture, a position he held until June 2006 when he left to join France Inter.

=== 2006–2010: France Inter and I-Télé ===
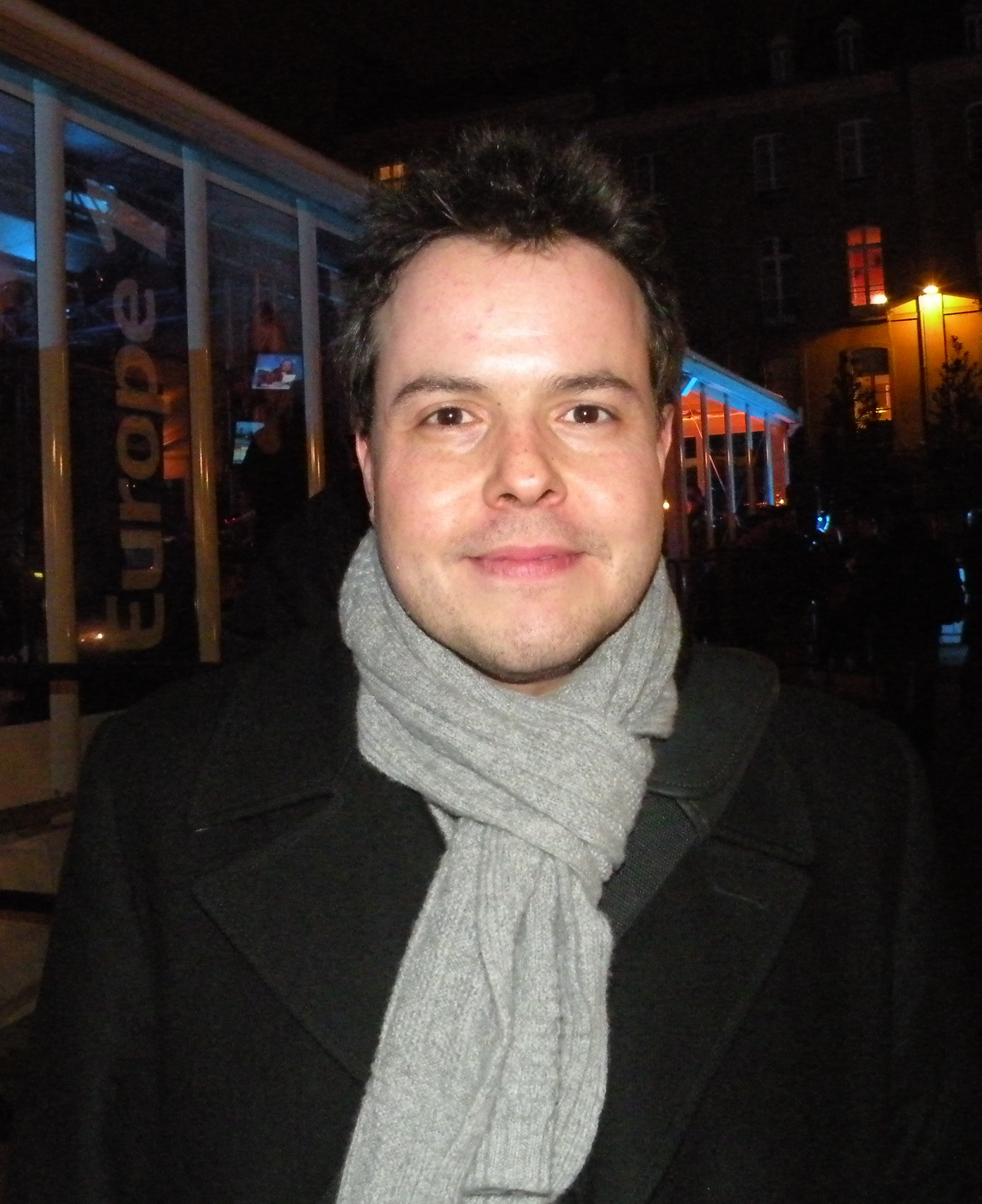
Demorand in Rennes in January 2011.

In August 2006, Demorand joined France Inter, then headed by Frédéric Schlesinger, and succeeded Stéphane Paoli as presenter of the morning news program. He presented Sept neuf trente, which became Le Sept dix in September 2007 and then Le Six trente dix in January 2010.

Meanwhile, on television, from September 2008 to April 2009, he hosted the 6 p.m. to 8 p.m. slot on the rolling news channel I-Télé, alongside Maya Lauqué.

He then hosted a political debate program called "C politique" on France 5 between September 2009 and February 2011, which follows on from Serge Moati's Ripostes.

He left France Inter's morning show in June 2010 amid controversy surrounding the new director of the public station Philippe Val, and subsequently left the station, after thirteen years at Radio France. He was then replaced by Patrick Cohen.

=== 2010–2011: Brief appearance on Europe 1 ===
Starting in the 2010 media season, Demorand took over the 6:00 p.m. to 8:00 p.m. slot on Europe 1. In this new time slot on this station, he continues to conduct a live interview with a guest. After a short time, he left Europe 1 on 18 February 2011 when his ratings were deemed disappointing, leaving his seat to Nicolas Poincaré to join Libération.

=== 2011–2014: Libération, RTL, Canal+ ===
On 1 March 2011, Demorand succeeded Laurent Joffrin as co-editor-in-chief of the newspaper Libération alongside Nathalie Collin, who had been co-president of the daily newspaper since 2009. He was approved by employees with 118 votes in favor and 90 against, or 56.7 percent to 43.3 percent. One of his first decisions was to close four local editions, the Libévilles in Lille, Strasbourg, Rennes and Orléans.

In June 2011, the staff of Libération made a no-confidence vote against Demorand, with 78 percent voting in favor, criticizing his isolation, absence, and management style.

In April 2012, the Libération staff union denounced the "sensationalist editorial line and autocratic attitude" of Demorand.

The editorial staff criticized Demorand for combining the roles of editorial director and chairman of the board, a position he relinquished on 19 June 2013 in favor of Fabrice Rousselot. Journalists also criticized him for "sensationalist headlines", such as "Casse-toi riche con! (English: “Get lost, you rich jerk!”), addressed on 10 September 2012 to Bernard Arnault, and "Une possible affaire Fabius" (English: “A possible Fabius affair”), from 8 April 2013, relaying a rumor about a Swiss bank account belonging to Laurent Fabius, which was denied a few days later.

Financially, after a 9.5 percent jump over one year thanks to the 2012 French presidential election, sales fell by 15 percent in two years, with single-issue sales collapsing by nearly 30 percent. The plan to save three to four million euros proposed by Demorand at the request of the newspaper's shareholders, including the revision of journalists' social agreements, was rejected in a vote of no confidence on 27 November 2013, with 89.9 percent voting in favor.

On 6 February 2014, employees launched a 24-hour strike and demanded for the third time the departure of Demorand and co-chairman of the board Philippe Nicolas. The following day, they opposed the publication of a text supporting the shareholders' plan to diversify the company by leveraging its brand, responding on 8 February with a statement: "We are a newspaper. Not a restaurant, not a social network, not a cultural space, not a TV studio, not a bar, not a start-up incubator."

On 13 February 2014, Demorand announced his resignation in an interview with the newspaper Le Monde.

During his tenure at Libération, he continued to contribute to various media outlets: as a columnist on RTL in the program On refait le monde, and RTL's morning show at the start of the 2011 academic year, then on the program Le Supplément on Canal+ in the fall of 2012.

=== 2014–present: Return to France Inter and France 3 ===
Demorand returned to France Inter in the fall of 2014, after the public radio station's management had just changed and Frédéric Schlesinger, his former director at France Inter, was now deputy director of broadcasting and programming at Radio France.

Every evening, he hosts Un jour dans le monde, an international news magazine reminiscent of Et pourtant elle tourne, a program presented at the same time between 2006 and 2010 by Jean-Marc Four, the station's editorial director.

During the summer of 2015, on Sundays, he presented Homo Numéricus, a program devoted to the digital world.

Following the strong ratings for his show and the departure of Hélène Jouan, he presented the 6 p.m. to 8 p.m. slot from Monday to Thursday with Mickaël Thébault, also taking over the presentation of Le téléphone sonne.

At the start of the 2016 academic year, he presented the political program Agora in place of Stéphane Paoli, every Sunday from 12 p.m. to 2 p.m. In addition, in fall 2016, he also presented a cultural magazine program, Drôle d'endroit pour une rencontre (English: A Strange Place for a Meeting) on France 3 on Fridays.

At the start of the new school year in September 2017, he continued hosting Le Sept dix|Le 7/9, which became Le 7/9.30 in 2022 and then Le 7/10 in 2023 with Léa Salamé, following the departure of Patrick Cohen. Les Inrockuptibles devoted their front page to him on this occasion, under the headline “Morning Star,” painting a "portrait of an intellectual geek, a workaholic on the microphone and a great audience builder."

On 28 August 2018, the Minister of Ecology Nicolas Hulot announced his resignation from the French government on France Inter, He and his co-host, Léa Salamé, were criticized for posting a self-congratulatory video on the France Inter website a few minutes after the resignation was announced.

== Personal life ==
His partner is the French public radio station France Culture journalist Louise Tourret, with whom he has two children born in 2007 and 2009. In March 2025, Demorand revealed that he has bipolar disorder and had been diagnosed eight years earlier, which he discussed in his book Intérieur nuit, which was very well received by critics and became a bestseller.
