= Daniel Picouly =

French writer (born 1948)

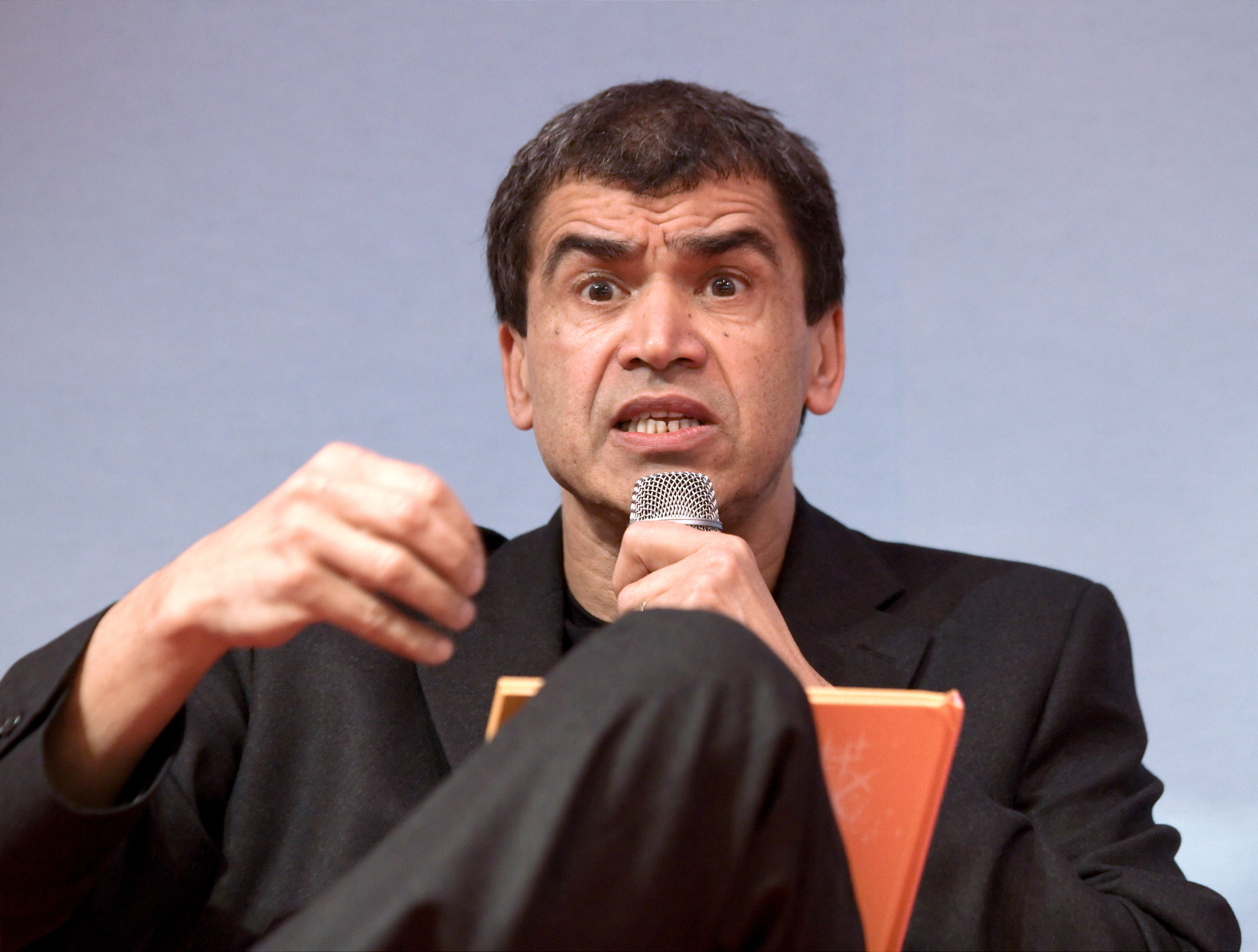
- Daniel Picouly in March 2010
- Born: 21 October 1948 (age 77); Villemomble, France
- Occupation: Writer

Daniel Picouly (born 21 October 1948 in Villemomble) is a French writer.

Picouly was reared in a family of 13 children. His parents were born in the French overseas territory of Martinique. He became a professor of economics in Paris.

In 1992 he published his first novel, The Light of fools, with the help of Daniel Pennac. He had great success in 1995, with The Field of people. In this book, as in many others, he recounts his childhood in a novel. He played himself in the film Imposture (2005).

He was the host of a cultural program on France 5, Café Picouly. From September 2008 to June 2009, he presented Café littéraire on France 2, before returning to France 5 in September 2009 with its Café Picouly.

He is a jury member on Le Prince Maurice and RFO prizes.

== Bibliography ==
- La lumière des fous (The Light of fools), 1992; Iuniverse.Com, 1999, ISBN 978-1-58348-160-8
- NEC, le Grand livre du mois, 1996
- Les larmes des chefs, 1994; Gallimard, 2004, ISBN 978-2-07-030025-9
- Le champ de personne (Nobody's fields), Flammarion, 1995, ISBN 978-2-08-067127-1, Grand prix des lectrices de Elle
- Cauchemar Pirate (Pirate's Nightmare), 1995
- Vive Noël! (Merry Christmas!), 1995
- Lutteur de Sumo (Sumo fighter), 1996
- Paris, rive noire, Editions Autrement, 1996, ISBN 978-2-86260-606-4
- Fort de l'eau, Flammarion, 1997, ISBN 978-2-08-067488-3
  - L'ultima estate. Feltrinelli Editore. 2000. ISBN 978-88-07-81614-7.
- Le 13è but, Hoëbeke, 1998, ISBN 978-2-84230-061-6
- La coupe du monde n'aura pas lieu, 1998
- Tête de Nègre, 1998; J'ai lu, 2004, ISBN 978-2-290-34573-3
- L'enfant léopard: roman, Librairie générale française, 1999, ISBN 978-2-253-15074-9
- On lit trop dans ce pays (we read too must in this country), Rue du monde, 2000, ISBN 978-2-912084-37-8
- Paulette et Roger, Librairie générale française, 2003, ISBN 978-2-253-15416-7
- La Donzelle: Un bâton rouge dans le chargeur, Editions du Rocher 2004, ISBN 2-268-05074-2
- Un beau jeudi pour tuer Kennedy, 2005; Grasset & Fasquelle, 2006, ISBN 978-2-246-62191-1
- Le coeur à la craie: roman, Librairie générale française, 2007, ISBN 978-2-253-11567-0
- La treizième mort du chevalier: roman, Librairie générale française, 2006, ISBN 978-2-253-11586-1
- Un bâton de rouge dans le chargeur: roman, Rocher, 2004, ISBN 978-2-268-05074-4
- Le coeur de craie 2005; Librairie générale française, 2007, ISBN 978-2-253-11567-0
- 68, mon amour: roman, Grasset, 2008, ISBN 978-2-246-71261-9

=== Children's books ===
- Lulu Vroumette, 2002; Magnard, 2005, ISBN 978-2-210-62411-5
- Hondo mène l'enquête: Trois énigmes pocières: Cauchemar pirate; Le lutteur de sumo; La coupe du monde n'aura pas lieu, Flammarion, 2002, ISBN 978-2-08-161358-4
- Retour de flammes (Backdraft), Illustrator José Muñoz, Casterman, 2003, ISBN 978-2-203-33494-6
- L'arche de Lulu, Magnard jeunesse, 2003, ISBN 978-2-210-97968-0
- Lulu et le sapin orphelin, Magnard, 2004, ISBN 978-2-210-97974-1
- Lulu et le loup bleu, Illustrator Frédéric Pillot, Magnard jeunesse, 2004, ISBN 978-2-210-97973-4
- Lulu a un amoureux, Magnard jeunesse, 2005, ISBN 978-2-210-97975-8
- Lumières d'enfance: La journée d'un enfant dans le monde, Michel Lafon, 2005, ISBN 978-2-7499-0346-0
- Le cirque de Lulu, Magnard jeunesse, 2006, ISBN 978-2-210-97977-2
- La maîtresse de Lulu a disparu, Illustrator Frédéric Pillot, Magnard jeunesse, 2006, ISBN 978-2-210-97976-5
- Lulu, présidente!, Illustrator Frédéric Pillot, Magnard Jeunesse, 2007, ISBN 978-2-210-97978-9
- Lulu et la cigogne étourdie, Magnard jeunesse, 2007, ISBN 978-2-210-97979-6
  - Thumbelina of Toulaba. Translated by Claudia Zoe Bedrick. Illustrator Olivier Tallac. Enchanted Lion Books. 2007. ISBN 978-1-59270-069-1.
- Lulu et l'ours pyjama, Illustrator Frédéric Pillot, Magnard, 2008, ISBN 978-2-210-97992-5
- Lulu princesse, Illustrator Frédéric Pillot, Magnard jeunesse, 2008, ISBN 978-2-210-97993-2
- Lulu et le dernier des dodos, Magnard, 2009, ISBN 978-2-210-97994-9
- La cuisine de Lulu la gourmande, Magnard, 2010, ISBN 978-2-210-01703-0

== Awards received ==
- 1996 Elle Reader's Prize for Le champ de personne
- 1999 Prix Renaudot for L'enfant léopard
- 2005 Prix des Romancières for Le cœur à la craie
