= La Quotidienne (TV series) =

French television programme

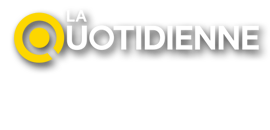
- Logo of La Quotidienne
- Presented by: Maya Lauqué; Thomas Isle
- Country of origin: France
- Original language: French
- No. of series: 2

Production
- Producers: France Télévisions; Jara & Co
- Production location: Vanves
- Running time: 72 min.

Original release
- Network: France 5
- Release: 30 September 2013 – present

La Quotidienne is a French television magazine programme devoted to consumer affairs, broadcast live from 30 September 2013 on France 5 from Monday to Friday, initially at 12:00, then at 11:45 from 10 February 2014. It is presented by Maya Lauqué and Thomas Isle.

A second series was announced for September 2014, following a summer "Best-Of" run.

== Concept ==
This programme is devoted to new forms of consumption, whether collaborative, supportive or economic. Surrounded by reporters, Lauqué and Isle are interested in initiatives and experiments implemented in these areas. The show is presented on a TV tray located near the headquarters of France 5 Vanves in Hauts-de-Seine.

The chief editor is Sylvie Cenci.

It occupies the lunch time slot, previously used for the children's strand Zouzous (now shown only in the morning) on France 5.

== Columnists ==
- Madeleine Ably
- Laetitia Barlerin, veterinary section
- Fabien Bordu, in matters of money and wealth
- Farida, kitchen
- Valerie Durier for consumption
- Philippe Gaudin, for consolidated information
- Gérard Michel, lawyer
- Charlotte Savreux, for testing products

== Sequences ==
=== Current sequence ===
- Helper: new sequence on home carers.
- Consolidated information: the current information on consumption, the economy etc.. Philippe Gaudin has a consolidated info every day.
- Record of the day: the experts and witnesses who are invited on the show answer questions from viewers.
- Test Bench (Monday and Friday): Charlotte Savreux tests food or medical products with columnists.
- Favourite food (Tuesday and Thursday): Farida shows recipes for cooking ideas.
- Miss veto (Wednesdays only): Veterinary sequence by Laetitia Barlerin.
- Case study: columnists answer questions from viewers.

=== Former sequences ===
- 2.0 Conso: old sequence on consumption 2.0 with Madeleine Ably.
- C'est déja demain: old news sequence with Philippe Gaudin.

== Audiences ==
After market shares below 1% at the launch of the show, La Quotidienne gradually gained audience with peaks of 180,000 and 200,000 viewers from the beginning of 2014, respectively, 1.5% and 2% audience share.

N°	Hearings	Market share
1	109.000	1%
2	96.000	1%
3	85.000	0.8%
4	68.000	0.7%
5	95.000	1%
6	87.000	0.8%
7	78.000	0.8%
8	70.000	0.6%
9	67.000	0.6%
10	95.000	0,9%
11	74.000	0.7%
12	71.000	0.7%
13	89.000	0.8%
14	98.000	1%
15	72.000	0,7%
16	92.000	0.8%
17	72.000	0.6%
18	68.000	0.6%
19	70.000	0.6%
...	...	...
80	182.000	1.5%
88	204.000	2%

== See also ==
- Consumption
