= Le sept neuf =

French news radio program

Le sept neuf ("The seven nine") – sometimes styled Le 7/9 – is the name of the main weekday morning news sequence broadcast by France Inter, the French public-service generalist radio network. Consisting of news bulletins, background reports, commentaries, press reviews, interviews, and a phone-in debate with listeners (including e-mailed comments), it goes out every weekday between 7.00 and 9.00 (hence the name). It debuted in 2010.

The weekend editions of the program, entitled Le sept neuf du samedi and Le sept neuf du dimanche, give greater coverage to leisure-time pursuits. Those editions are currently presented by Patricia Martin and Fabrice Drouelle.

The program's main weekday presenter as of December 2010 is the radio journalist Patrick Cohen.
