= Salut les copains (magazine) =

Defunct French music magazine

- Salut les copains No. 122, October 1972
- Categories: Music magazine
- Frequency: Monthly
- Founded: 1962
- Final issue: April 2006
- Country: France
- Language: French

Salut les copains (meaning Hi friends in English), later changed to Salut!, was a French music variety magazine published between 1962 and 2006. Launched by Frank Ténot and Daniel Filipacchi as supporting media to the Europe 1 radio program Salut les copains, the magazine covered French music as well as American and British pop and rock acts. At its peak, its circulation exceeded one million copies per issue.

On 22 June 1963, to celebrate the magazine's first anniversary, Europe 1 organized a concert in Place de la Nation. The concert was attended by 200,000 people, with performances by Sylvie Vartan, Vic Laurens, Richard Anthony, Dick Rivers and Les Chats Sauvages, Danyel Gérard, Les Gam's, Nicole Paquin and Johnny Hallyday. After the event, sociologist Edgar Morin in an article in the French daily Le Monde dubbed it the "yé-yé generation" giving rise to the French style of music known as "yé-yé".

The magazine's success prompted the launching of similarly titled German, Spanish and Italian editions of the magazine. It also resulted in many youth-oriented French publications being launched including Âge Tendre, Bonjour les amis, Best, Extra and Nous les garçons et les filles.

As interest slackened in both the radio program and the yé-yé style of music it supported, the magazine was renamed Salut! in January 1994. Its licence was sold to Edipresse, which turned it from a monthly to a bimonthly publication, with coverage expanding to general interest articles for youth. Faced with reduced readership, the magazine folded in April 2006.
