= Vincent Hervouët =

French journalist (born 1957)

- Born: 13 September 1957 (age 68); Nantes, France
- Education: Centre de formation des journalistes Paris-Sorbonne University
- Occupation: Journalist
- Known for: Editor-in-chief of LCI
- Title: President of L'Association de la presse diplomatique
- Term: 2010–2014
- Predecessor: Bruno Fanucchi
- Parent: Daniel Hervouët (father)
- Relatives: Philippe Hervouët (brother); Dominique Hervouët (brother); Gabriel Hervouët (grandfather)

Vincent Hervouët (born 13 September 1957) is a French journalist. Formerly the head of the Foreign Affairs department at LCI, the TF1 Group's 24-hour news channel, from 2008 to 2021, he has been a commentator on Europe 1's morning show, covering international news. He also appears regularly on the program L'Heure des pros, hosted by Pascal Praud on the television channel CNews. He also writes a weekly column in JDNews, a news magazine published every Wednesday as a supplement to Le Journal du dimanche.

== Early life ==
Vincent Hervouët was born on 13 September 1957 in Nantes. He is the son of Daniel Hervouët (1919–1982), professor at the Centre hospitalier universitaire de Nantes and Clinic Head at the Saint-Jacques Hospital, as the sixth of seven children. He has two brothers who are also journalists working in western France: Philippe and Dominique.

== Career ==
A graduate of the Centre de formation des journalistes (CFJ) in 1980, Hervouët worked for Radio France Internationale and then France Info. Meanwhile, he helped create two radio stations: Alouette in Vendée and Medi1 Radio in Morocco.

In 1994, Hervouët helped create the 24-hour news channel LCI. From 2001 onwards, he worked as presenter for Journal du monde, a news program devoted to international current affairs, which he always ends every show with the phrase: "Ainsi va le monde. L'info continue sur La Chaîne Info." (English: "Such is the way of the world. The news continues on La Chaîne Info.") As head of the news channel's international department, his responsibilities expanded in 2008 when he took charge of the division created by the merger of the foreign department of LCI and the senior reporters of TF1. He also presents the weekly program Le Forum de l'Histoire on Histoire TV. In 2010, and again in 2012, he was elected president of L'Association de la presse diplomatique.

On 21 April 2008, Hervouët interviewed the President of the French Republic Nicolas Sarkozy during a program hosted by Patrick Poivre d'Arvor and David Pujadas, with the participation of Véronique Auger and Yves Calvi. Broadcast live from the Élysée Palace, this 90-minute interview was aired simultaneously on TF1 and France 2.

On 13 July 2017, on the radio, Hervouët was recruited by Europe 1 to take charge of international news on Patrick Cohen's morning show. He continues to deliver his column on international issues in Europe Matin, which follows on from Cohen's, presented by Nikos Aliagas (2018–2019), Matthieu Belliard (2019–2021) and Dimitri Pavlenko (2021–present).

== Awards and achievements ==
In November 2003, Hervouët was made a Knight of the French Ordre national du Mérite.

In December 2010, he received the Grand Prix de la Presse in the "television" category from the Foreign Press Association for his work on international news on LCI.

In June 2014, he was elected to the Académie des sciences d'outre-mer.

== Controversies ==
In mid-December 2014, a whistleblower named Chris Coleman disclosed on Twitter emails received by an executive at the Moroccan intelligence and counter-espionage service Direction générale des Études et de la Documentation (DGED), several of which were from a Moroccan journalist, Ahmed Charaï, who forwarded them (in the body of the email, and not as attachments) emails supposedly sent by various French (including Hervouët) and American journalists demanding payment for services rendered in support of the "Moroccan Sahara" thesis, in particular through accusations of links between the Polisario Front and Al-Qaeda in the Islamic Maghreb (AQIM). Dominique Lagarde, José Garçon, and Mireille Duteil, three journalists also implicated by Chris Coleman, denied his claims, and echoed the hypothesis put forward by certain Moroccan media outlets that this "Chris Coleman" is in fact an agent of the Algerian secret services, a hypothesis also taken up in an article in the daily newspaper Le Monde devoted to the case.

When contacted by the website Mediapart, Hervouët replied, "Some emails are completely false, others are three-quarters false, and in others, only a single word has been changed." On the other hand, the news site Arrêt sur images considers these emails to be likely authentic, after verification of the metadata in these documents, and also points out that Hervouët is also a shareholder in two companies created by Ahmed Charaï, Audiovisuelle Internationale (which oversees the Radio Med radio service), and Media South, created last May with a share capital of 300,000 dirhams (27,000 euros).

On 31 March 2022, Hervouët spoke about the issue of farmers' discontent on the French television show L'Heure des Pros 2 and accused Muslims of being partly responsible, saying, "Farmers... one hangs himself every working day in France. Their fields, their machinery, their fuel... We're entering Ramadan, and it will be the sheep that will be stolen... During Eid, there are sheep thefts everywhere! In short, there is a real sense of absolute loneliness among farmers." On 24 April 2022, the Collective Against Islamophobia in Europe (French: Collectif contre l'islamophobie en Europe) announced that it had filed a complaint for "racial defamation" and "incitement to hatred" following his comments.

== Publications ==
- Articles de voyage (Atlantic, 2002)
- Ainsi va le monde, 100 chefs d'État à la question (Albin Michel, 2014)
