= Salut les copains (radio program) =

- The popular artists in France pictured in 1966, including Johnny Hallyday, Serge Gainsbourg, France Gall, Françoise Hardy, Claude François and Adamo.
- Genre: Music show
- Running time: 2 hours (5:00 pm – 7:00 pm)
- Country of origin: France
- Language: French
- Home station: Europe 1
- Hosted by: Frank Ténot, Daniel Filipacchi
- Original release: 1959 – 1969

Salut les copains was a famous French variety pop music radio program broadcast between 1959 and 1969, from Monday to Friday for 2 hours (5 to 7 pm) on French radio station Europe 1. It was known to have originally promoted and launched the success of the French musical genre of yé-yé.

== Background ==
The program was created by Jean Frydman and presented by Frank Ténot and Daniel Filipacchi on Europe 1 and was launched on 19 October 1959. The program enjoyed a huge following, with a survey saying more than 40% of French youth between 12 and 15 years listened to it at its peak season.

The name of the program is taken from a 1957 song by Gilbert Bécaud called "Salut les copains". The lyrics had been co-written by Bécaud and Pierre Delanoë. Delanoë at the time was the director of programming on Europe 1 and named the program after the song.

The program, initially (and for a brief period) a weekly broadcast, was soon turned into a five-days-a-week show. The program proved to be a cultural and social phenomenon when during a concert in Place de la Nation organised by the station on 22 June 1963 (to celebrate the first anniversary of launching of the magazine Salut les copains), 200,000 youth attended to hear Sylvie Vartan, Richard Anthony, Dick Rivers et les Chats sauvages, Danyel Gérard, les Gams, and Johnny Hallyday.

The program also prompted popular French rock artist Johnny Hallyday to release an album of the same title in 1961.

== Discography ==
- Coffret Salut les copains, 50e anniversaire, Les cent tubes de Salut les copains – 4 CDs, Europe 1/Universal Music/Editions Montparnasse (3 November 2009).
- Box collector Salut les copains, 50e anniversaire – reissue of discs on a CD of twenty 45 rpm, plus booklet, poster realised by Jean-Marie Périer, Europe 1/Universal Music/Editions Montparnasse (30 November 2009)

== Videography ==
- Coffret Salut les copains, 50e anniversaire, 3 DVDs, Europe 1/INA/Editions Montparnasse, 2009.
- Jingles of the radio program, 120 songs of the 1960s, featured interviews and news of the epoque
