= Longwave transmitter Europe 1 =

German radio station

Coordinates: 49°16′49″N 6°40′41″E

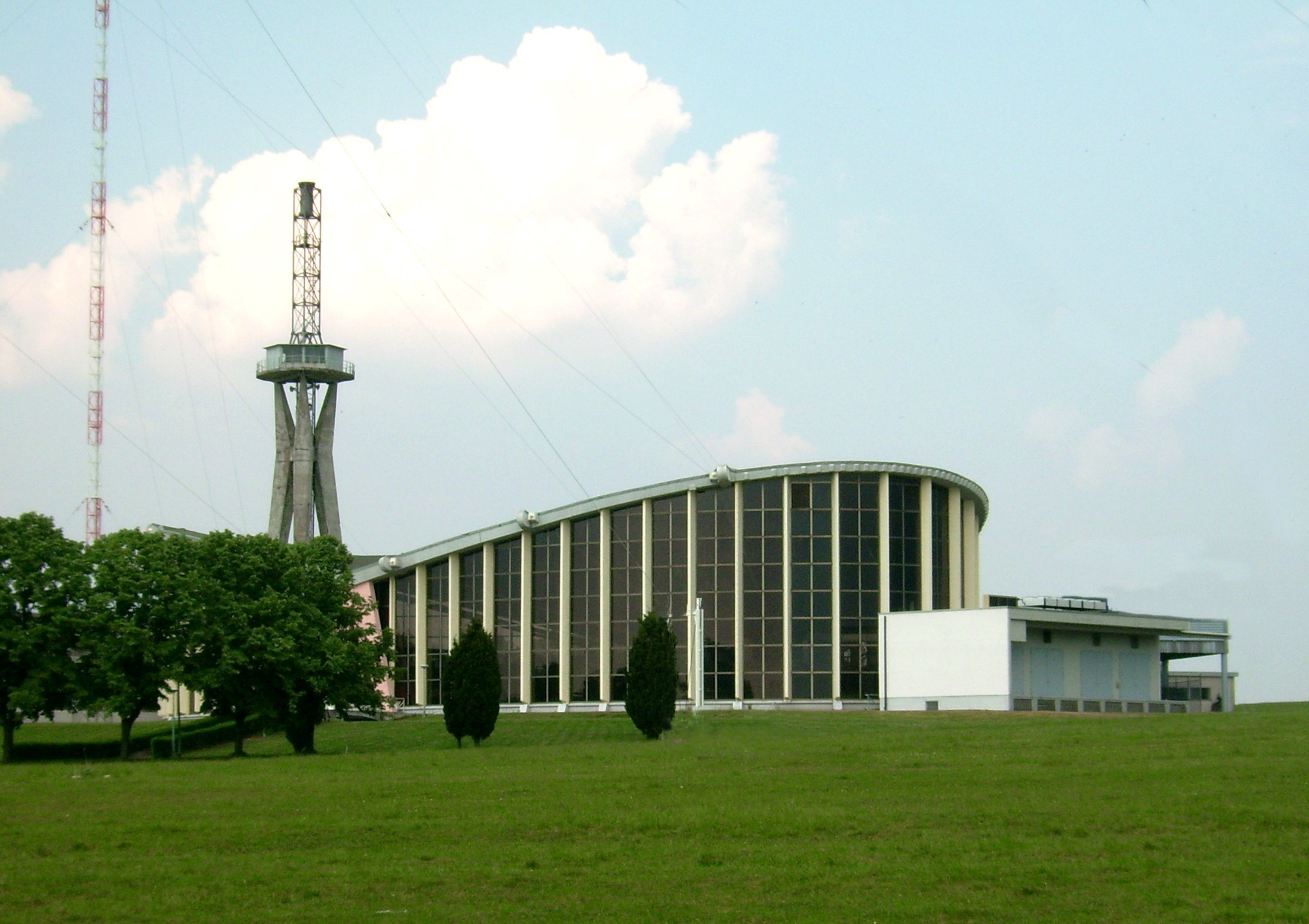
Transmitter building of Europe 1 with one of the radio masts in the background

The Longwave transmitter Europe 1 was the oldest privately owned radio station in Germany, situated between Felsberg and Berus/Saar, Germany. It transmitted on 183 kHz with a power of 2,000 kilowatts a French speaking programme, Europe 1 toward France. It was the highest power radio broadcasting transmitter in Germany. Longwave transmissions stopped on 31 December 2019.

It was owned by Broadcasting Center Europe (BCE), a subsidiary of RTL Group. In 2020 the last masts were blown up.

== Technical details ==
The transmitter used directional aerials of four guyed, insulated radio masts which are 270, 276, 280, and 282 metres (886', 905', 919' and 925') high. Furthermore, there is a backup aerial, which consists of two guyed insulated radio masts with a height of 234 metres (768 ft).

Due to the strong south-west directional characteristic of the antenna, reception to the northeast of the transmitter (i.e. in the largest part of Germany) is poor or distorted.

The building, in which the transmitters are situated, has a length of 82 metres (269 ft), a width of 43 metres (141 ft), and a height of 16 metres (52 ft). Its surface area is 2,700 square metres (29,000 sq. ft.) and its volume 31,000 cubic metres (40,000 cu. yd.). In front of this building, there is a telecommunication tower, which was used for broadcasting the programme of Telesaar.

A new transmitter house with new 2x750 kW transmitter was built in 2015 next to the backup aerial, that was used until the shutdown in 2019.

On the morning of 8 August 2012 an 80 meters (262') tall part of the 280 meters (919') high transmitting mast broke down. This was caused by a ragged guy wire. The damaged mast was demolished on 19 November 2012. Mast 1 was demolished on 13 June 2013, because it was useless without mast 2.

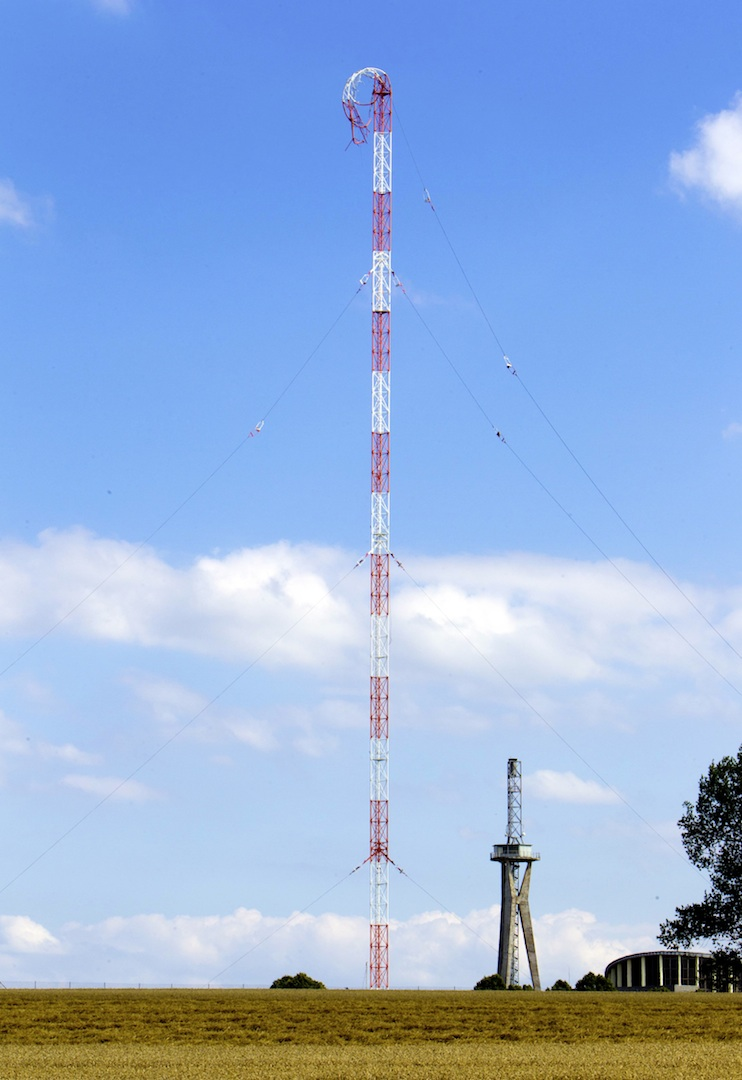
Partially collapsed mast

== History ==
The longwave transmitter traces its existence to the special state of the Saar Protectorate in the 1950s: Occupied by France in 1946, the French military authorities allowed the people to organize elections and govern themselves, becoming a Protectorate using the French Franc as money. It was integrated to the Federal Republic of Germany in 1957 as a compromise between France and Germany, after the Saar people decided by referendum against a "special European district" status they were proposed. The transmitter was built in 1954, broadcasting since 1 January 1955, on land which is now located inside German borders. In 1959, one of its main masts was relocated to vertical.

== See also ==
- List of masts
- Transmitter Building Europe 1
- List of famous transmission sites
- http://www.saar-nostalgie.de/europeno1.htm
