= Pascal Praud =

French journalist, media personality and television producer

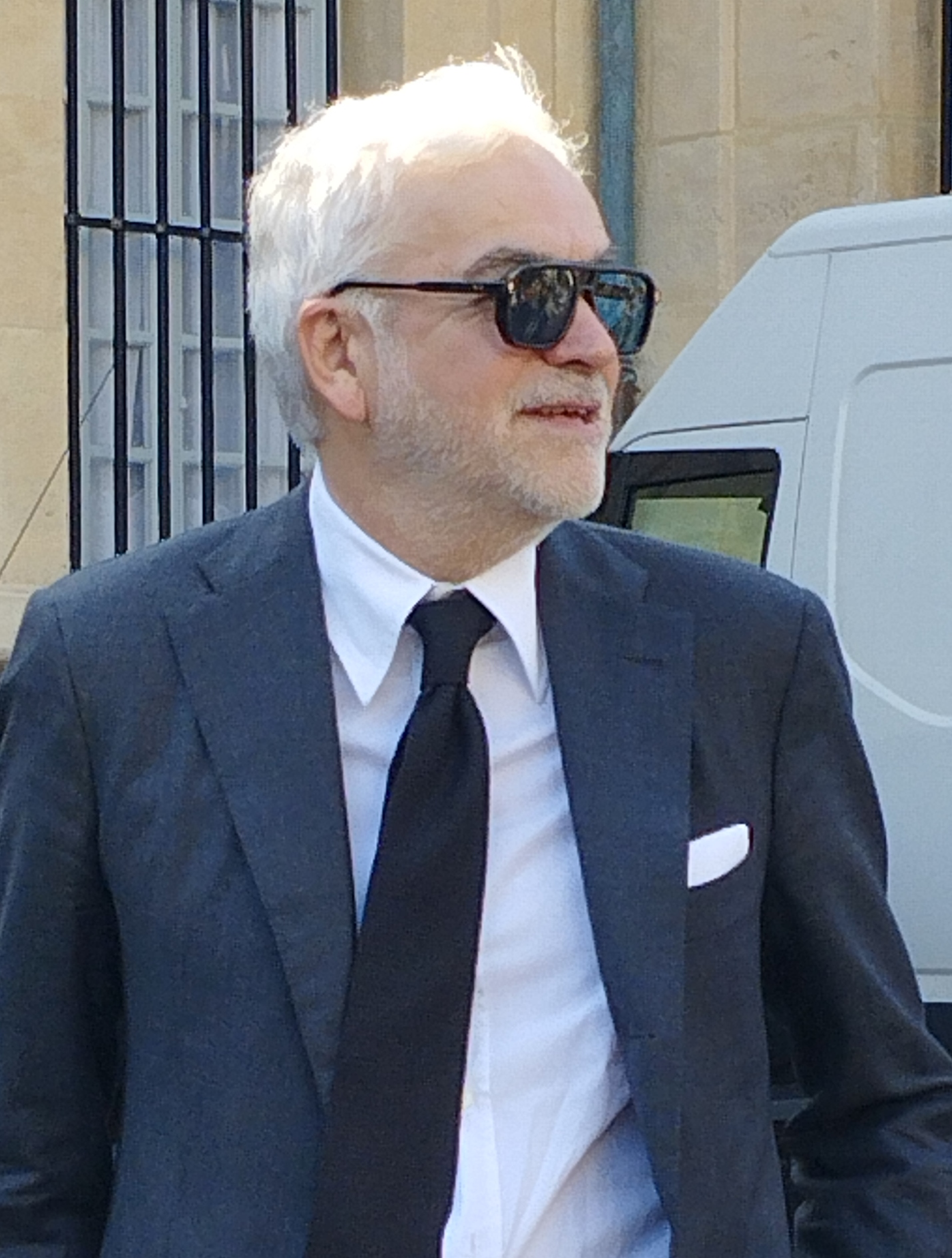
- Pascal Praud arriving at the funeral of Philippe Labro at the church of Saint-Germain-des-Prés, 2025.
- Born: 9 September 1964 (age 62); Nantes, France
- Occupation: Journalist L'heure des pros
- Employer(s): CNews; Europe 1
- Known for: Football

Pascal Praud (born 9 September 1964) is a French far-right personality, sports journalist, radio columnist, radio host, television presenter and producer.

After 20 years with TF1, especially alongside Thierry Roland on Téléfoot, he became general manager in charge of communication and marketing of FC Nantes in 2008 for two years. On radio, since 2010, he has hosted several sports broadcasts on RTL, also writing a column for the station's morning show from 2014 to 2018. On television, since 2017, he has produced and hosted several shows on CNews dealing with football as well as current affairs and politics.

In the French media, according to some, Pascal Praud would participates in the normalisation of the ideas of the French far-right, notably those of Éric Zemmour, and in the archconservative political positions held by Vincent Bolloré. He has generated controversy on multiple occasions for positions he espoused during his broadcasts. These include denying the existence of climate change and tying the spread of bedbugs to immigration. He has also been accused of misogyny towards many of his female colleagues.

== Biography ==
He is the son of Roger Praud, apprentice footballer at FC Nantes who fought during the Algerian War, and Michelle Dubois.

== Radio ==
In 1988–2012 he commented on On refait le match, a broadcast by Eugène Saccomano on RTL. In 1988–2008 he hosted Tirs au but on RTL. In 2010–2018 he co-hosted Multiplex RTL-L'Équipe et du Grand match de Ligue 1 on RTL, alongside Christian Ollivier. In 2012–2018 he hosted On refait le match on RTL. In 2014–2018 he was an editorialist on Le Praud de l'Info in Yves Calvi's daily morning show, as well as L'Actualité de la semaine écoulée on Saturdays on RTL. From 2018 to 2023 he has hosted Les auditeurs ont la parole on RTL.

In July 2023, Praud formalized his departure from RTL and his transfer to Europe 1. Since September 2023 he has hosted the show Pascal Praud et vous broadcast on Europe 1 at midday.

== Political positioning and controversies ==
=== Far-right in the media ===
Pascal Praud is considered a figure of the far-right in the media, alongside personalities like Éric Zemmour. He contributed to the mainstreaming of far-right theses on French television. Alexis Lévrier supports that his program involves promoting the ideas of Éric Zemmour. Marlène Laruelle, a professor at George Washington University, sees his show as one of the three flagship programs on the CNEWS channel in terms of far-right.

For example, during the 2022 French presidential election, Praud supported Zemmour by stating, among other things, that "the other candidates don't interest anyone" or, after comments from Emmanuel Macron, "he (Zemmour) is better than the others. (...) His statement is the most accurate, the most intelligent". Praud also denied the existence of the far right in France. He plays a central role in the ultra-conservative media policy led by Vincent Bolloré. Lucie Guimier categorized him within the "anti-system and reactionary nebula" in an article published by the academic journal Hérodote.

In 2021, Pascal Praud told the magazines Le Point and Valeurs actuelles: "I am very conservative regarding culture, history, authority, and security. I no longer recognize the France in which I grew up because the transmission did not happen. I am also very progressive on societal issues, such as same-sex marriage, assisted reproduction, surrogacy. And, economically, I am liberal". In the same context, Benoît Hamon refused to meet with him and debate on his show that year. According to Philippe Ridet, a journalist at Le Monde, Pascal Praud is a "master of invective"; "Macho, populist, right-wing, 'pub owner' are now words associated with his name". In June 2018, Les Inrockuptibles described the commentator as an "uninhibited right-winger". According to Middle East Eye, he is populist and "openly Islamophobic".

In 2022, on CNews, Pascal Praud acknowledged the channel's proximity to the ideas of Éric Zemmour.

In 2023, after the publication of a parody sketch of Pascal Praud's show by the French comedian Malik Bentalha, which was viewed 33 million times in a month, he reacted by stating, "They portray me as a reactionary when I'm more of an anarchist. I value freedom above all".

During the 2024 French legislative elections, Praud supported a "union of the right" between The Republicans (LR) and the National Rally (RN). During the same campaign, he clearly favored far-right candidates by attacking and demonizing the New Popular Front (NFP).

=== Far-right rhetoric ===
According to Renaud Maes, a Belgian left-wing sociologist and researcher specializing in the far-right, Pascal Praud and Eric Zemmour employ the same rhetorical techniques as right-wing populists, the extreme right, and neo-fascists. He writes in an academic article dedicated to the issue of "cancel culture":

"Pascal Praud, Éric Zemmour, etc., do not hesitate to claim that they are prevented from speaking publicly. The mention of a supposed threat to one's public and media speech, even while expressing oneself publicly in a media without interruption or real opposition, is a rhetorical stratagem widely used by right-wing populists, the extreme right, and neo-fascists worldwide. This allows them to spread the conspiratorial idea of an 'internal threat' aiming to 'destabilize society.'"

The French left-wing researcher Valérie Robert, an associate professor at Sorbonne-Nouvelle University (Paris III) and director of the Franco-German journalism master's program at the same university, compared the media strategies of CNews and Fox News, using Pascal Praud as an example. She suggested that French media and public discourse leaned "strongly" towards the far-right as a result. This comparison with Fox News was also made by the Financial Times, noting that Pascal Praud often chooses "topics favored by the far right, such as anti-police protests, the veil worn by some Muslim women, and skepticism towards climate change". The New York Times made a similar analysis, which was then echoed and confirmed by the researcher Robert E. Gutsche. Alan Ouakrat, an associate professor at Sorbonne-Nouvelle University, stated, in connection with the issue of hate speech in the French public space, that 'L'Heure des Pros', i.e Praud's program, is "the starting point and anchor of hate speech and argumentative pieces compiled by users to assert their arguments and reinforce the certainty of the validity of their opinions". Left-wing semioticians Jean-Maxence Granier and Éric Bertin argued that Pascal Praud's show establishes the rhetorical technique of the "false debate", describing it as follows:

"This false debate relies on a rhetorical artifice that transforms a point of view into an obvious truth, under the guise of 'speaking the truth,' making it the voice of the French people and common sense. In this discursive power move, the primacy of arguments and the recognition of actors are evacuated."

Jean-Maxence Granier dedicated an additional article to the subject, where he stated:

"Conservative, Catholic, traditionalist ideas, deeply rooted on the right, supported by an identity and civilizational populism, are championed by individuals such as Éric Zemmour, Pascal Praud, or Sonia Mabrouk. These ideas are primarily framed within a perspective of decline, nationalism, making Islam the central problem in France, associated with immigration issues and law enforcement, while identifying 'wokeism' as the other major danger that needs to be combated."

=== Minimization of sexual violence ===
Pascal Praud has repeatedly been criticized for comments perceived as minimizing or casting doubt on the testimony of women who are victims of sexual violence, often within a broader “anti-woke” or anti-feminist framing. In 2018, in Le Point, Praud declares about the pedophile, he calls a "marvelous writer" : "I very much like Gabriel Matzneff, whose books I believe I own in full. I like his style, his phrasing, his rhythm. I like what he says and the way he says it."

Praud repeatedly criticized also what he described as “media justice” surrounding Gérard Depardieu, or Ary Abittan, suggesting that television investigations and public outrage were replacing proper judicial process. During the Pelicot rape case, he said "At the risk of displeasing some, I do not feel guilty about anything. The men who entered Mrs. Pelicot’s room are the only ones responsible for their actions.

On 1 April 2025, he was accused of Victim blaming and promotting Rape culture when he talked about “women who were never looked at by men”, during a debate about including consent more explicitly in the legal definition of Rape in France, Pascal Praud, pretexting a “feeling of revenge” coming from “radical feminists” or “ultra-feminists,” and a “generational divide”. He also criticized a "questionable" link between pedophilia, the Church and during the Bétharram scandal with the prime minister François Bayrou. These statements came notably during controversy surrounding the continued presence of Jean-Marc Morandini on air, on his channel CNews, despite his conviction for corruption of minors.

== Filmography ==
He played himself in a short appearance in the film Trois Zéros by Fabien Onteniente (2002).
