= Filipacchi =

Filipacchi is a surname. Notable people with the surname include:

- Amanda Filipacchi (born 1967), American writer
- Daniel Filipacchi (born 1928), the Chairman Emeritus of Hachette Filipacchi Médias

== See also ==
- Hachette Filipacchi Médias (HFM), the largest magazine publisher in the world
- Hachette Filipacchi Media U.S. (HFM U.S.), subsidiary of Hachette Filipacchi Médias, based in New York City
