= Saargau =

The Saargau was a Frankish Gau county (Gaugrafschaft). Today the name is given to the ridge between the rivers Saar and Moselle in Germany and, in the south, the region between the Saar and the French border.

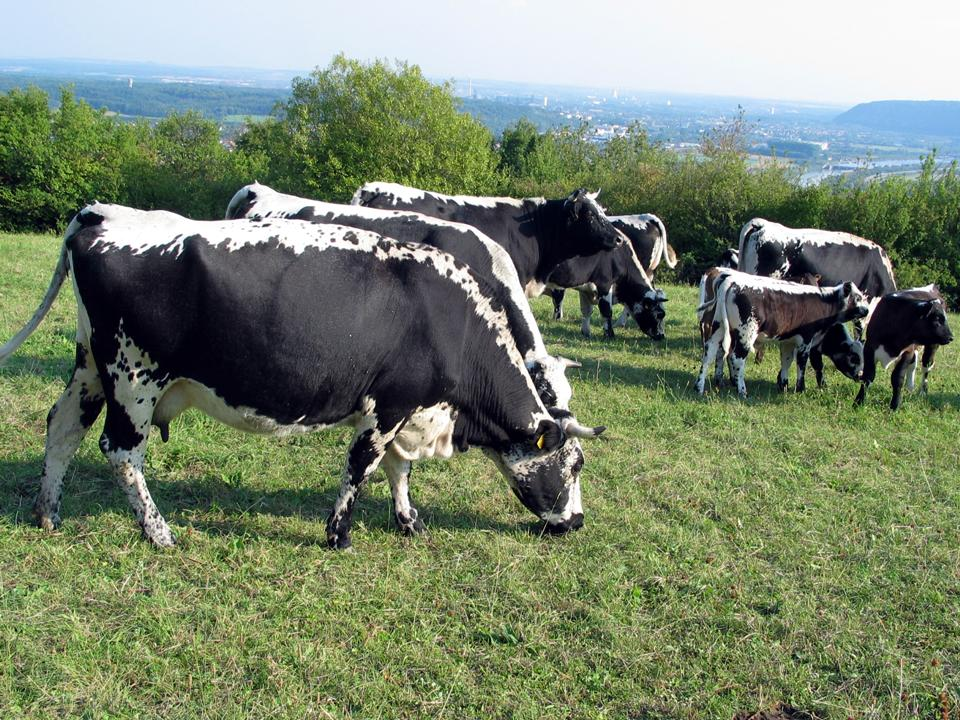
Herd of Vosges cattle on the Wolferskopf with a view of the Saargau

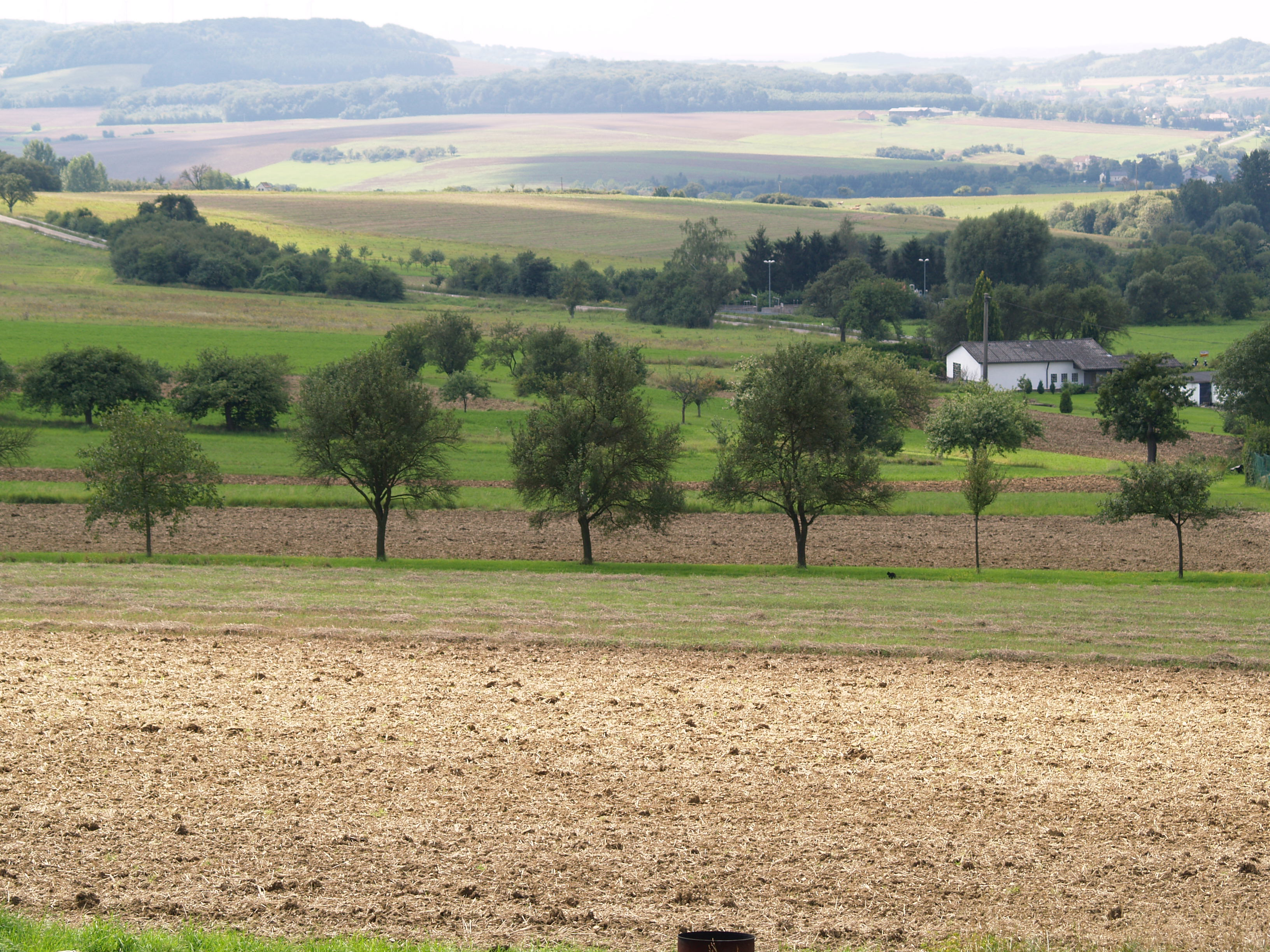
The Saargau near Korlingen

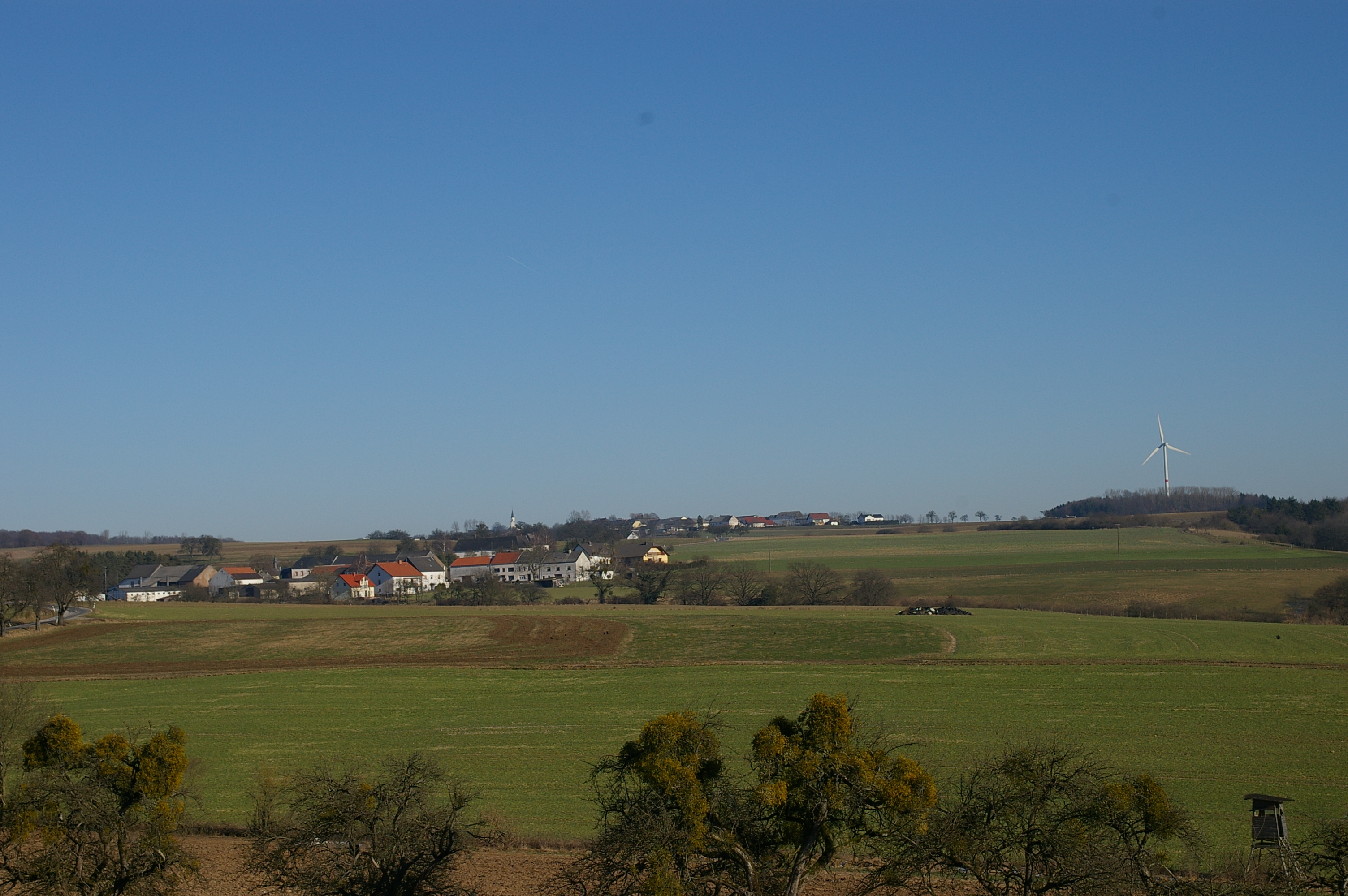
The Saargau near Merzkirchen

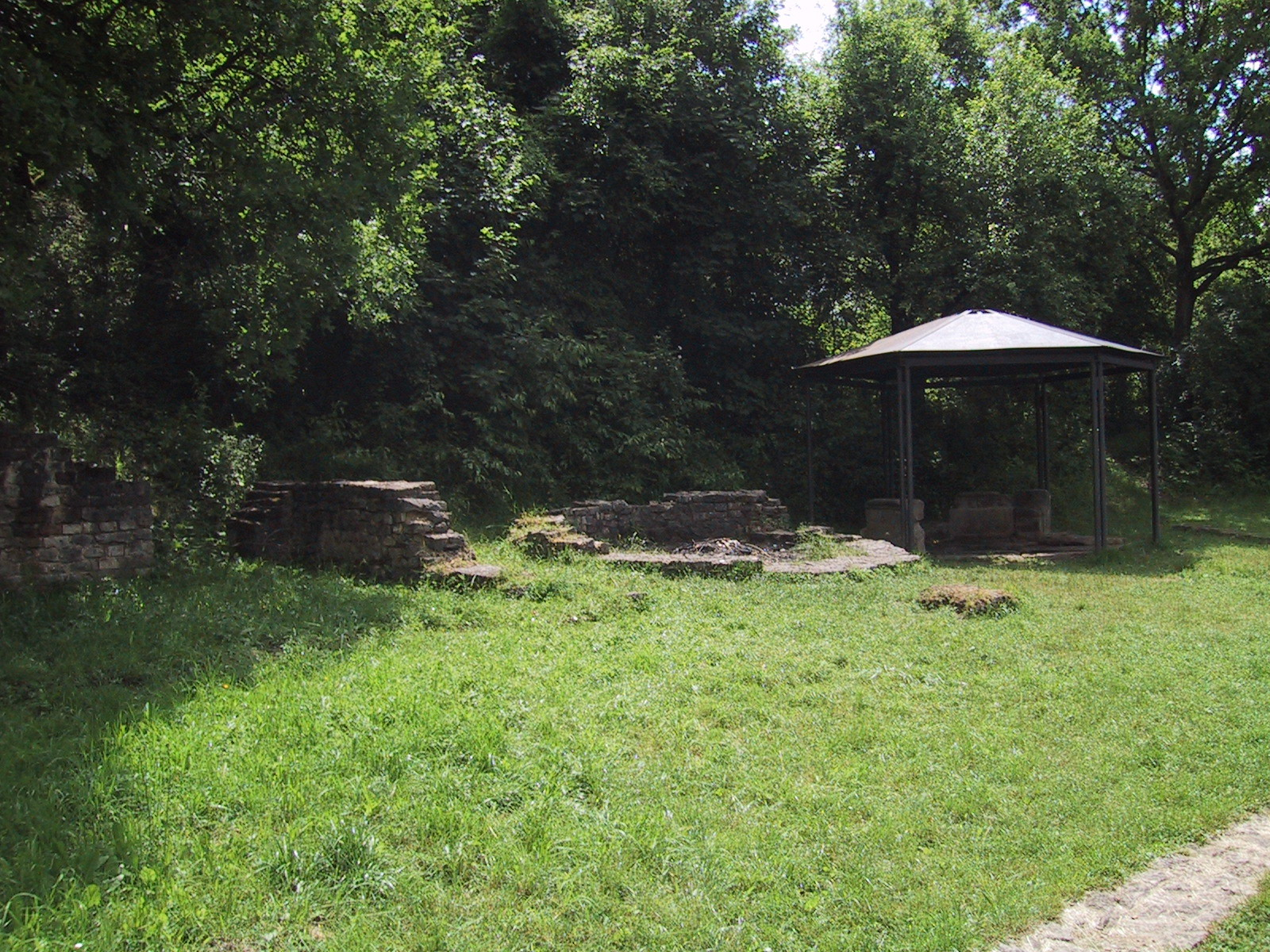
Sudelfels spring sanctuary

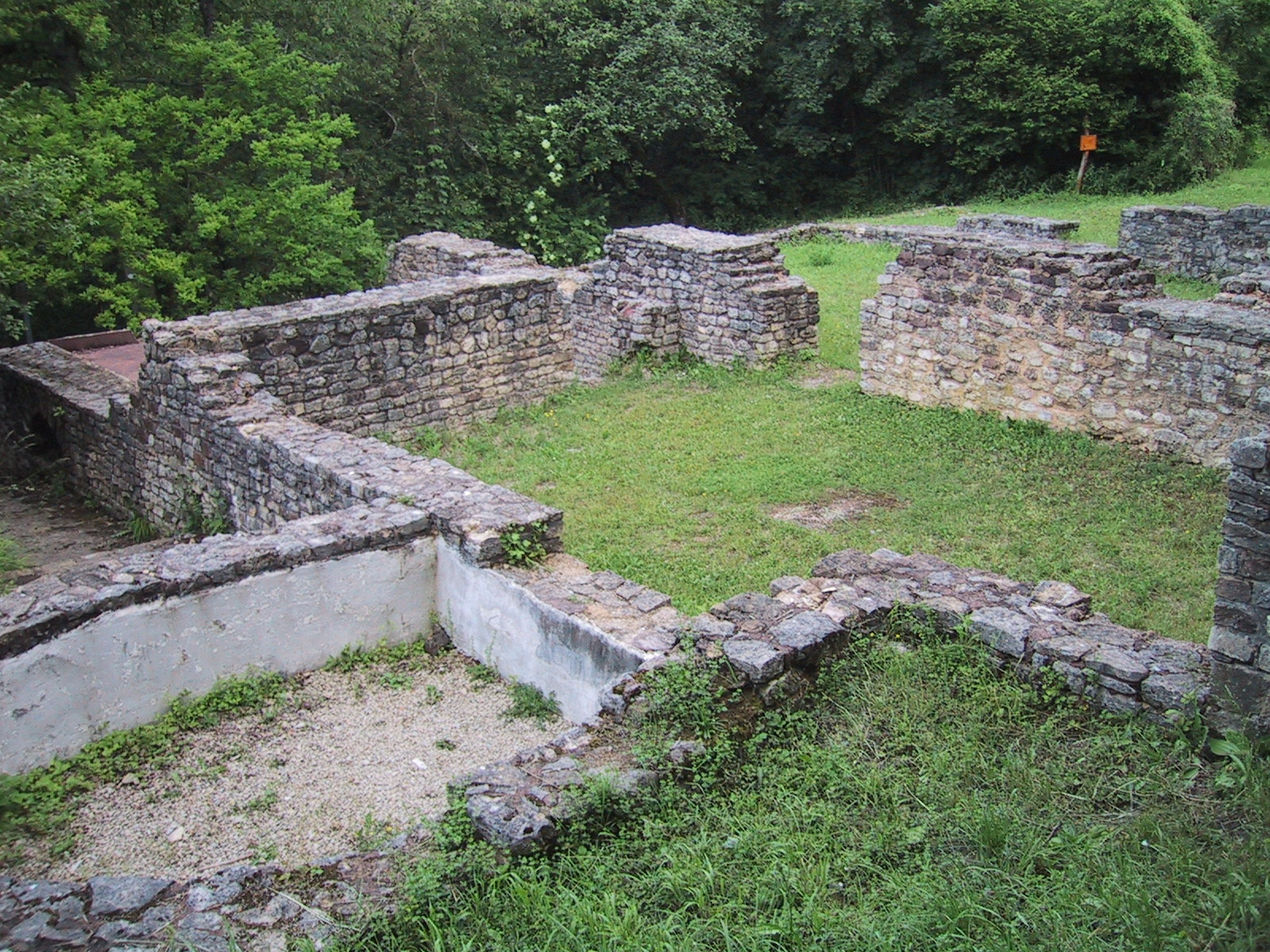
Ruins of the Roman cult site in Ihn

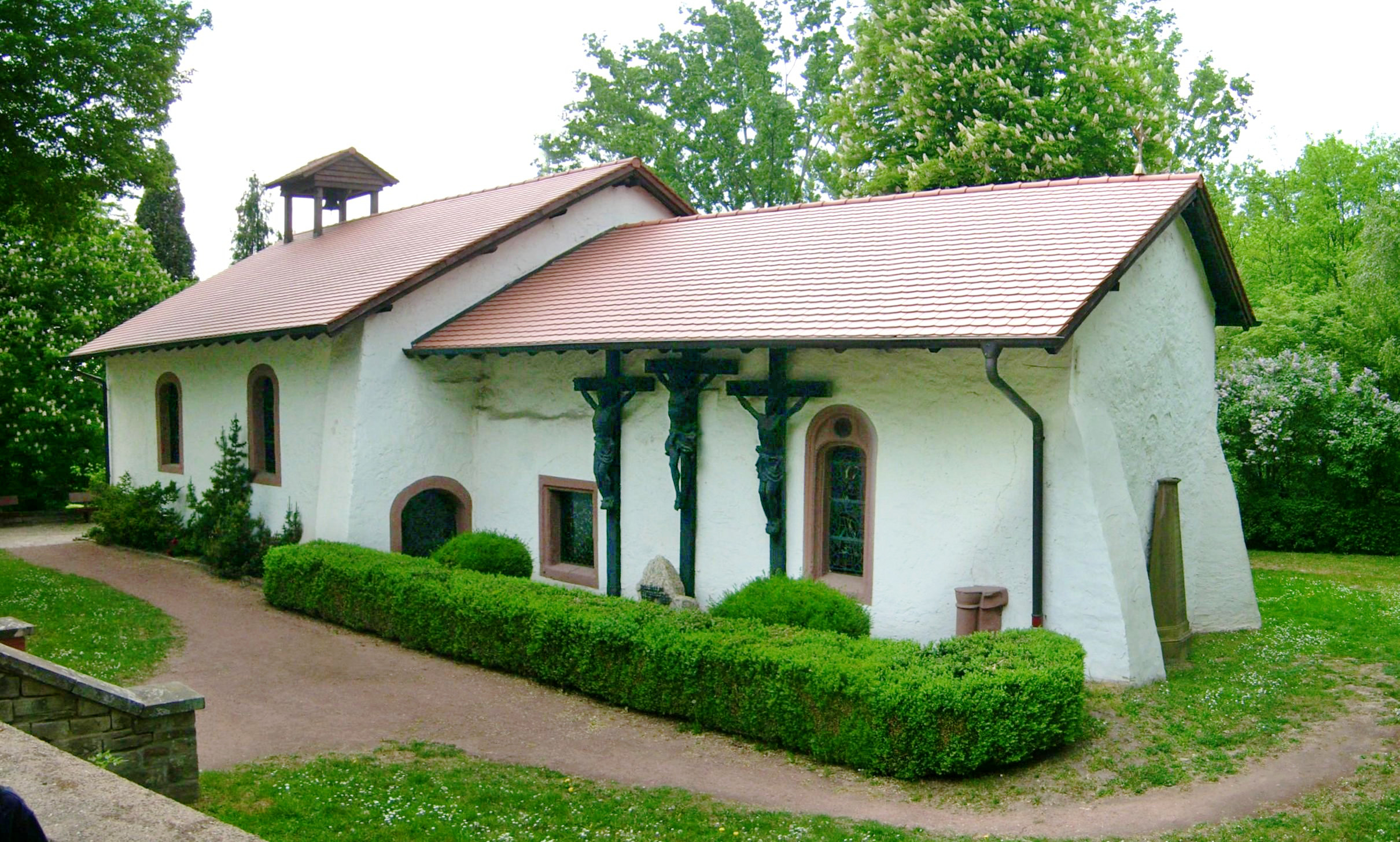
The Oranna Chapel near Berus

== County of Saargau ==
The Saargau was a Frankish gau county that is recorded as early as the 7th century and, at that time, also included that part of the Saar valley which is today in France. In the Treaty of Mersen (870 A.D.) two Saar counties are named: comitatus Sarachuua inferior (Lower Saargau) and comitatur Sarachuua subterior (Upper Saargau), of which only the Lower Saargau continued to bear the name Saargau.

== Landscape of Saargau ==
The Saargau is a ridge west of the River Saar. It begins in the south near Berus, runs northwards along the French border, from the Saarland over to the neighbouring state of Rhineland-Palatinate. The northern part is bounded in the west by the Moselle and ends near Konz, where the Saar empties into the Moselle.

The eastern edge of the Saargau, in the Saarland, drops steeply down to the Saar valley. To the west, towards Lorraine and over the Franco-German border, the gau landscape is rather flat and broad with gently rolling hills. Geologically, the Saargau, belongs to the Lorraine Scarplands, which rise every few kilometres from west to east in steep escarpments, the land sloping almost imperceptibly between each pair of escarpments. On the western foothills of the Saargau, in the area of the Moselle, wine is grown. The predominant grape here is the Elbling.

The gau landscape is mainly characterised by heavy muschelkalk soils. In the area of the villages of Borg, Oberleuken, Büschdorf, Eft-Hellendorf, Sinz, Münzingen, Kesslingen and Faha crops are grown and it is described as the breadbasket of the Saarland. This intensively farmed region extends into Rhineland-Palatinate which borders it to the north, especially around the villages of Merzkirchen, Fisch and Mannebach (near Saarburg). In addition, there are meadow orchards everywhere and, immediately around the villages of Tettingen-Butzdorf and Borg commercial fruit is grown. The Viezstraße road runs over the Saargau. The steep hillsides of the eastern foothills of the Saargau that descend towards the Saar are mostly covered in woods. In the northern area around the Saarburg there are also vineyards where the well known Rhineland-Palatine Saar Riesling is grown.

The Saargau reaches heights of around 400 metres above sea level (NN) in the north (Nitteler Höcht 390 m, Helenenkreuz near Wincheringen 413 m); further south it rises to nearly 450 metres (Eiderberg near Freudenburg 440 m, Kewelsberg near Tünsdorf 442 m).

== Sights ==
- Berus: Remains of the medieval town fortifications, parish church of St. Martin, Europa Monument, Oranna Chapel
- Felsberg: Teufelsburg (Saarland). Europe 1 transmitter
- St. Barbara: Roman copper mine
- Ihn: Roman spring sanctuary on the Sudelfels rock
- Siersburg: Siersburg castle site. Valley of the Nied
- Niedaltdorf: dripstone cave.
- Wellingen: Steine an der Grenze sculptures
- Orscholz: Cloef (Viewing point on the Saarschleife),
- Borg: Reconstruction of a Roman Villa
- Kastel-Staadt: Klause high above the Saar
- Gisingen: Haus Saargau Museum
- Beckingen: Wolferskopf Nature Reserve and Fischerberghaus (orchid colonies, mother cow herd and Vosges cattle, circular walk)
