= Praud =

Praud is a surname. Notable people with the surname include:

- Antoine Praud (born 2003), French para-athlete
- Pascal Praud (born 1964), French journalist
