= Europe 1 Transmitter Building =

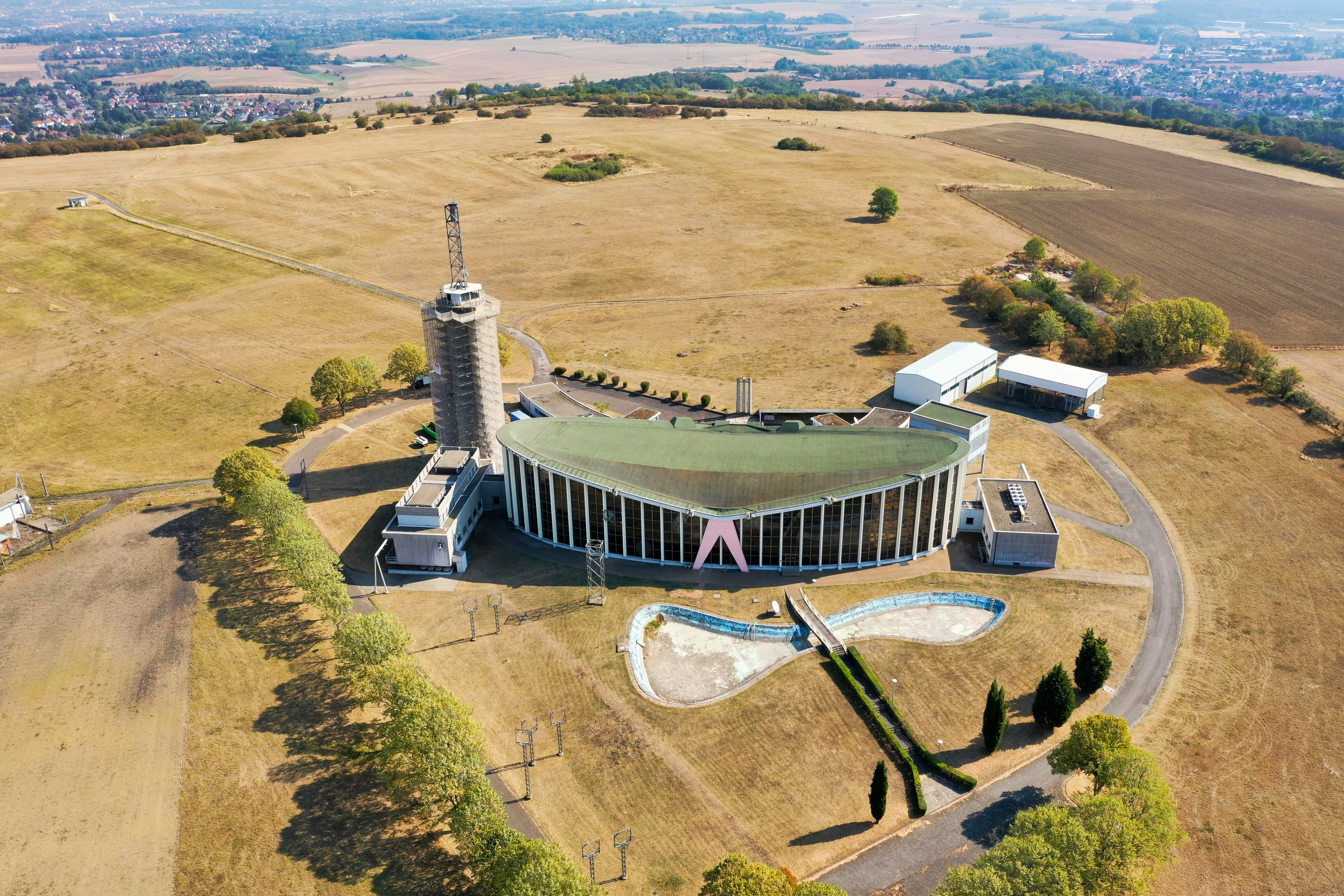
The broadcasting hall from above

The Europe 1 Transmitter building is located in Felsberg, a part of the municipality Überherrn, Germany close to the French border. It was built in 1954 to house the transmitter device of Europe 1, and the maiden transmission was made on January 1, 1955.

The building is a very remarkable concrete construction without support pillars, and is nowadays under monumental protection. In front of the building, there is a telecommunication tower of reinforced concrete, which should be used for transmitting the programme of Telesaar. It has a length of 82 metres, a width of 43 metres, a surface area of 2,700 square metres (from which are 1770 square metres of glass) and a volume of 31,000 cube metres. Waste heat generated by the transmitters is cycled to heat the inside of the building.

== See also ==
- Longwave transmitter Europe 1
