= Nadia Daam =

French journalist (born 1978)

- Born: 24 October 1978 (age 47); Strasbourg, France
- Education: La Sorbonne Nouvelle University
- Occupation: Journalist
- Employer: Arte

Nadia Daam (born 1978) is a French radio and TV journalist. She is a reporter for Radio Europe 1 and for 28 Minutes, a programme of the Franco-German TV channel Arte. She is known for reporting on trolling and cyber-bullying, and has been targeted as a result of her work.

In 2017 Daam reported on attacks against an "anti-pest" telephone hotline that women could give to men who were pressuring them for a phone number. Daam was then threatened in the forum "Blabla 18–25 ans" of the website Jeuxvideo.com and elsewhere. Daam and Radio Europe 1 filed a complaint with the French police, and in 2018 some of her harassers were convicted under Article 222-17 of the French Penal Code. The legal case has been described as "a turning point for online harassment cases" in France, establishing that "what is illegal offline is also illegal online", and "demonstrating that those responsible for cyber-harassment of journalists can be held accountable to the law".

== Life ==
Brought up in Strasbourg to a Moroccan family, Daam obtained a Baccalauréat in 1996 at the International School of Pontonniers. She studied at Lycée Victor-Hugo in Paris, she also obtained a bachelor of performance art, at La Sorbonne Nouvelle Paris 3.

She started to work for the newspaper Libération in 2000. For two years she was in charge of personal ads. In 2008, she published the essay Mauvaises mères! and became a columnist at Les Maternelles on France 5. Subsequently, she collaborated with Slate, Arte (a 28-minute show) and Europe 1, among others.

== 2017-2018 harassment and court case ==
In 2017, French feminist activists Clara Gonzales and Elliot Lepers set up an “anti-relou” (anti-pest) telephone hotline. Women were advised to give the hotline's mobile phone number to inappropriately persistent men who tried to get their phone number. Calling the number resulted in an SMS message about inappropriate behavior: “Hello! If you’re reading this message it’s because you have made a woman uncomfortable … It’s not complicated: if a woman says ‘no’ don’t insist. Learn to respect women’s freedom and their decisions. Thank you.” Over three days, the anti-harassment phone number was subjected to a concerted trolling campaign, receiving 26,000 messages, with each SMS reply costing the organizers 16 centimes. On Monday afternoon, over 20,000 of the calls were hate messages, some of them death threats. The organizers were publicly identified on social media, including by writers of the forum "Blabla 18–25 ans" of the website Jeuxvideo.com. Their personal information and home address were released and they were victims of online and offline harassment.

On 1 November 2017, Daam discussed the attacks on the “anti-relou” (anti-pest) telephone hotline on the program Europe 1. She identified Blabla 18-25 ans, and called it among other things "a non-recyclable rubbish bin".

This was followed by personal attacks against Daam which included online abuse, rape and death threats, threats against her child, attempts to hack her phone, and an attempt to break into her home. By November 3, Europe 1 radio and other media had posted a petition in Daam's support, signed by a hundred journalists, designating members of the online forum as "cowardly, shabby and despicable beings" ("des êtres lâches, minables et méprisables"), and calling on "the police and the community of the web" to prevent further harm. Secretary of State for Equality between Women and Men Marlène Schiappa called Twitter and Webedia, the company owning jeuxvideo.com. There were also calls for advertisers to boycott Jeuxvideo.com, which resulted in pasta manufacturer Barilla suspending its ad campaign.

The director of Jeuxvideo.com, Cédric Page, condemned "these actions" while defending the forum, saying that "it is simply the expression of this generation". The forum was regularly blamed for propagating hate speech and otherwise known according to the newspaper Libération to be a scaremonger for anti-feminist activists. In response to public pressure, the owner of Webedia, the company owning jeuxvideo.com, said that "the topics evoking this Nadia Daam were systematically erased as a preventative measure". The company stated that they would join in a complaint against the stalkers, and increase moderation of the website.

Daam and Europe 1 radio jointly filed a complaint with the police. Upon investigation, the police identified seven possible perpetrators, and charged two of those men with making rape and death threats. In 2018, the case was successfully prosecuted under Article 222-17 of the French Penal Code, which criminalizes threats to commit a crime. The men were given suspended prison sentences and fined. The Paris Court of Appeal ruled that the incriminating messages met the high evidentiary burden required for Article 222-17, as they were “intended to ‘punish’ Daam as a journalist” and “deserved a sentence sufficiently dissuasive to prevent a new offence, particularly via the internet, a communication tool perfectly mastered by the accused who, acting under a pseudonym, which proves his cowardice, could only be identified thanks to the cyber investigations of the police”. Later, a third man was arrested, prosecuted, and given a suspended sentence for making death threats.

The legal case been described as an important one in France, as "a turning point for online harassment cases", establishing that "what is illegal offline is also illegal online", and "demonstrating that those responsible for cyber-harassment of journalists can be held accountable to the law". It is referenced internationally by organizations such as Reporters Without Borders, International Center for Journalists, Mapping Media Freedom and the Organization for Security and Co-operation in Europe, in discussions of the cyberbullying and harassment of journalists, particularly women journalists.
