= Les Chaussettes Noires =

French rock band

Les Chaussettes Noires (English: 'The Black Socks') were a French rock and roll band founded in 1960, that was among the pioneer of rock music in France, together with Les Chats sauvages.

It was originally composed of Claude Moine, a.k.a. Eddy Mitchell (vocals), William Benaïm (guitar solo), Tony D'Arpa (rhythm guitar), Aldo Martinez (bass guitar), and Jean-Pierre Chichportich (drums)

Les Chaussettes Noires signed in late 1960 with Barclay Records, under which the band recorded a score of successful gramophone records, including: "Be-Bop-A-Lula" (1960), "Tu parles trop" (1960), "Daniela" (1961) — which remains their biggest hit, "Eddie Sois Bon" (1961) — a French adaptation of Chuck Berry's 1958 song "Johnny B. Goode", "Hey Pony" (1961), "Madame Madam" (1961), "Dactylo rock" (1961), "La leçon de twist" (1962), "Le twist du canotier" (1962) with Maurice Chevalier, and "Parce que tu sais". They also recorded a cover version of Ernie Maresca's self-penned 1962 hit, "Shout! Shout! (Knock Yourself Out)".

In 1962, the band released their only studio album Le 2.000.000eme disque des Chausettes Noires.

The band declined from 1962 with the departure of Mitchell for his military service. He started a solo career in 1963. The group stopped recording in late 1964.

As a result of replacement or integration, the following musicians were also part of the band: Michel Santangeli (drums), Arturo Motta (drums), Armand Molinetti (drums), Gilbert Bastelica (drums), Michel Gaucher (saxophone), Mick Picard (saxophone), and Paul Benaïm (rhythm guitar).
