= Benoît Clair =

French journalist and author (born 1953)

Benoit Clair
- Born: 1953 (age 72–73)
- Occupations: Journalist; author
- Children: 2
- Writing career
- Genre: Non-fiction

Benoit Clair (born 1953) is a French journalist and a published author.

== Career ==
After studying journalism, sciences politiques and law in University in Paris and Tours (France), Benoit Clair began his career as the French Parliament liaison for Remy Montagne, who was deputy of the 3rd district of Louviers, in the Eure area. In 1974, Clair was a correspondent for French media like Radio France and Europe 1. He was one of the first French journalists to cover the war in Lebanon (1974–1975), with Gabriel Dardaud. Founder of the free radio Paris FM in 1981, which three years later became a subsidiary of Europe 1, Clair was appointed its co-director together with Robert Namias. Located in the Montparnasse Tower, Paris FM later changed its name to 95.2 FM, then Fun Radio Group, which is still in business.

In 1985, the prestigious French publication Paris Match delegated Clair as special envoy to the Johnson Space Center in Houston, Texas, to observe the training of two CNES French spacemen, members of the first Franco-American shuttle crew. A senior writer for Paris Match, Benoit was the first journalist allowed to join the shuttle crew members. He accompanied them 24 hours a day, for the entire training period until their departure for the launch pad at Cape Canaveral. A series of reports on the training was published in Paris Match in 1985 and 1986. Paris Match sold more than one million copies worldwide covering this major event. Benoit's first book, Aujourd'hui le soleil se lève 16 fois (Today, the Sun Rises 16 Times), was the outcome of this assignment and was published in September 1985 by Carrère-Lafon. The book covers the space trip of Patrick Baudry, French payload specialist aboard NASA's Space Shuttle Discovery mission STS-51-G. The book was followed by an audio CD produced by CBS France in January 1986. The series features the narration of the space trip, written by Clair, with voice-over by Michel Chevalet from TF1.

Later, Clair was hired by Aérospatiale as head of Communication of their Ariane 5-Hermès space program. In 1988, Benoit was appointed communications advisor for the political campaign of Raymond Barre, presidential candidate. After the election, he was retained as director of communication and marketing for Europe by the American group AlliedSignal/Bendix Corporation, headquartered in Morristown, New Jersey.

Clair moved to the United States in 1991, as communication consultant and accredited journalist correspondent of French media entities like Le Figaro, Prisma-Presse group (VSD) and RTL. He was the permanent correspondent of Radio Monte Carlo from 1995 to 2007. During his tenure at RMC, he was the producer and host of a daily hit broadcast show, live from New York with numerous shows edited from Hollywood, California. The show lasted from 1996 to 2000. In 1996, 2000, 2004, 2008 and 2012, Clair covered the US Presidential Elections for different French media, like TV5 and published, in 2004, a second book about Senator John Kerry's campaign. The book was John F. Kerry targets the White House; Pierre Salinger, the former press secretary of President John F. Kennedy, wrote the foreword. In 2007, Clair co-wrote the script, produced and directed the film The Truth about Black Dahlia, commissioned by NBC Universal for French TV sub-channel 13ème rue using new digital cinematography cameras, i.e., the RedOne. Clair is currently Senior Correspondent for several French and European media-companies and associate-producer for a series of TV and high-profile HDTV news and documentary videos. He is also Managing Chief Editor at BCLTV Productions, a French-based TV productions company with several subsidiaries through the world (NYC, LA). He is the widower of a 9/11 victim and has two kids.

== Films and writings ==
- The Dream is alive (Le rêve est vivant), 1986: Screenplay and voice-over, IMAX Canada – USA – Japon – France (La Géode)
- "Waiting for Hermès" ("En attendant Hermès") and "Children of the mine", ("Les enfants de la mine"), 1998: Special Envoy to Peru TV station FRANCE 2
- Information Mercenaries (Les mercenaires de l'Info), 52 min.: Screenplay TF1 Prime News
- The Truth about Black Dahlia (La vérité sur le Dahlia noir), 52 min., 2007: Screenplay and Director, NBC Universal and 13ème Rue TV (Paris)
- Several other contributions for entities such as TV5MONDE, LCI TV (TF1), LCP-Assemblée Nationale and CNN
- Today, the Sun rises 16 Times (Aujourd'hui le soleil se lève 16 fois), publisher Carrère-Lafon, Paris.
- John F. Kerry targets the White House (John F. Kerry: Objectif Maison-Blanche), foreword by Pierre Salinger, Publisher Le Felin, Paris.
- FBI - 100 years (FBI - 100 ans d'histoire), in the making, to be published in 2024.
- ‘’Eugène Bullard: a French-American héros ‘’ to be publish in 2024.
- ‘’ Je t’emmènerais dormir en Provence’’ à novel and a feature film about 9/11 aftermath in New-York City, to be published and aired in 2025.
