= Le 2.000.000eme disque des Chausettes Noires =

Studio album by Les Chaussettes Noires
- Released: 1962
- Genre: French rock
- Label: Barclay

Le 2.000.000eme disque des Chausettes Noires (translated The 2,000,000th disc of the Black Socks) is the first studio album released by the French rock and roll band Les Chaussettes Noires. It was released on the Barclay label in 1962. The album was later reissued on compact disc.

The album includes covers of songs popularized by American artists, Joey Dee and the Starliters ("Peppermint Twist"), Elvis Presley ("Little Sister"), Dion DiMucci ("Runaround Sue"), The Righteous Brothers ("Unchained Melody"), and Big Joe Turner ("Shake, Rattle and Roll").

The album was included in Philippe Manœuvre's book of the 123 essential French rock albums.

== Track listing ==
Side A

1. "Peppermint Twist" (part one) (adapted by Georges Aber, music by J. Dee Glover) [2:48]
2. "Peppermint Twist" (part two) (adapted by Georges Aber, music by J. Dee Glover) [2:25]
3. "C'est La Nuit" (The Night Is So Lonely) (adapted by Claude Moine, music by Gene Vincent, C. Simon) [2:35]
4. "Line" (Dream) (adapted by Georges Aber, music by B. Boudleaux) [2:27]
5. "Petite Sœur D'amour" (Little Sister) (adapted by Claude Moine, music by Mort Shuman and Doc Pomus) [2:12]
6. "La Leçon De Twist" (Lucien Morisse, G. Mengozzy) [2:15]

Side B

1. "Le Chemin De La Joie" (D. Hortis, A. Borly) [1:58]
2. "Infidèle" (Runaround Sue) (adapted by A. Grelbin, music by Dion DiMucci, A. Ferreri, Ernie Maresca)[2:55]
3. "Non Ne Lui Dis Pas" (Mountain's High) (adapted by Ralph Bernet, music by D. Saint Jean) [1:57]
4. "Les Enchaînés" (Unchained Melody) (adapted by Pierre Delanoë, music by Hy Zaret, Alex North) [2:52]
5. "Le Temps Est Lent" (Right Now) (adapted by Claude Moine, music by S. Bradfor, A. Lewis) [2:08]
6. "Shake, Rattle and Roll" (adapted by J. Ledrain, G. Bertret, music by C. Calhoun) [2:51]
