= Régis Le Sommier =

French journalist (born 1969)

- Born: 28 October 1969 (age 56); Toulon, France
- Occupation: Journalist
- Employer: OMERTA Media

Régis Le Sommier (born 28 October 1969) is a French journalist.

== Biography ==
Régis Le Sommier was co-editor of Paris Match magazine. As a senior reporter and US Bureau Chief from 2003 to 2009 of the largest French weekly publication and fifth most read in the world, Paris Match, he has made journalistic reports of the most important events of the past decade.

In addition to being the only French journalist to have sat down in the White House with President George W. Bush for a one-on-one, he also interviewed President Barack Obama, Donald Rumsfeld, Colin Powell, Al Gore, Arnold Schwarzenegger, Garry Kasparov, Alan Greenspan, John McCain, General David Petraeus in Baghdad and General Stanley McChrystal in Kabul. He has written journalistic reports about Hurricane Katrina, Guantánamo, immigration and drug trails in Mexico and Central America, and the ravages of foreclosures in Cleveland.

In Central America, he has published articles about Guatemala and Venezuela, including one on El Sistema, the state-run program that gives access to classical music to poor children from the Caracas barrios.

He was a news reporter during the 2004 and 2008 US presidential elections. Between 2006 and 2008 he made three trips to Iraq, and two in 2010 to Afghanistan where he embedded with various units from the Army and the Marines. He also published several stories on wounded veterans.

He joined RT France in 2021 until the Russian media was banned by the French government in March 2022. But actually, he became the managing editor of Omerta in November 2022. He went to Both Ukraine and Russia and reported his observation in the French media.

== Publications ==
He is the author of Les Damnés du Prestige (2003) about the oil spill in Spain and a second book on the Iraq war (L’Irak n’existe plus, March 2008, Ed. du Toucan). In addition, he also published the first biography in French of the former CIA director, David H. Petraeus (David Petraeus, un beau jour dans la vallée du Tigre, 2012, Editions Erick Bonnier). More recently, he published an historical essay ("Les Mystères d’Oradour. Du temps du deuil à la quête de la vérité", 2014, Editions Michel Lafon). And in January 2018 he published a book called Assad that talks about Syria and former president Bashar al-Assad.
