= Frédéric Taddeï =

French journalist and television host (born 1961)

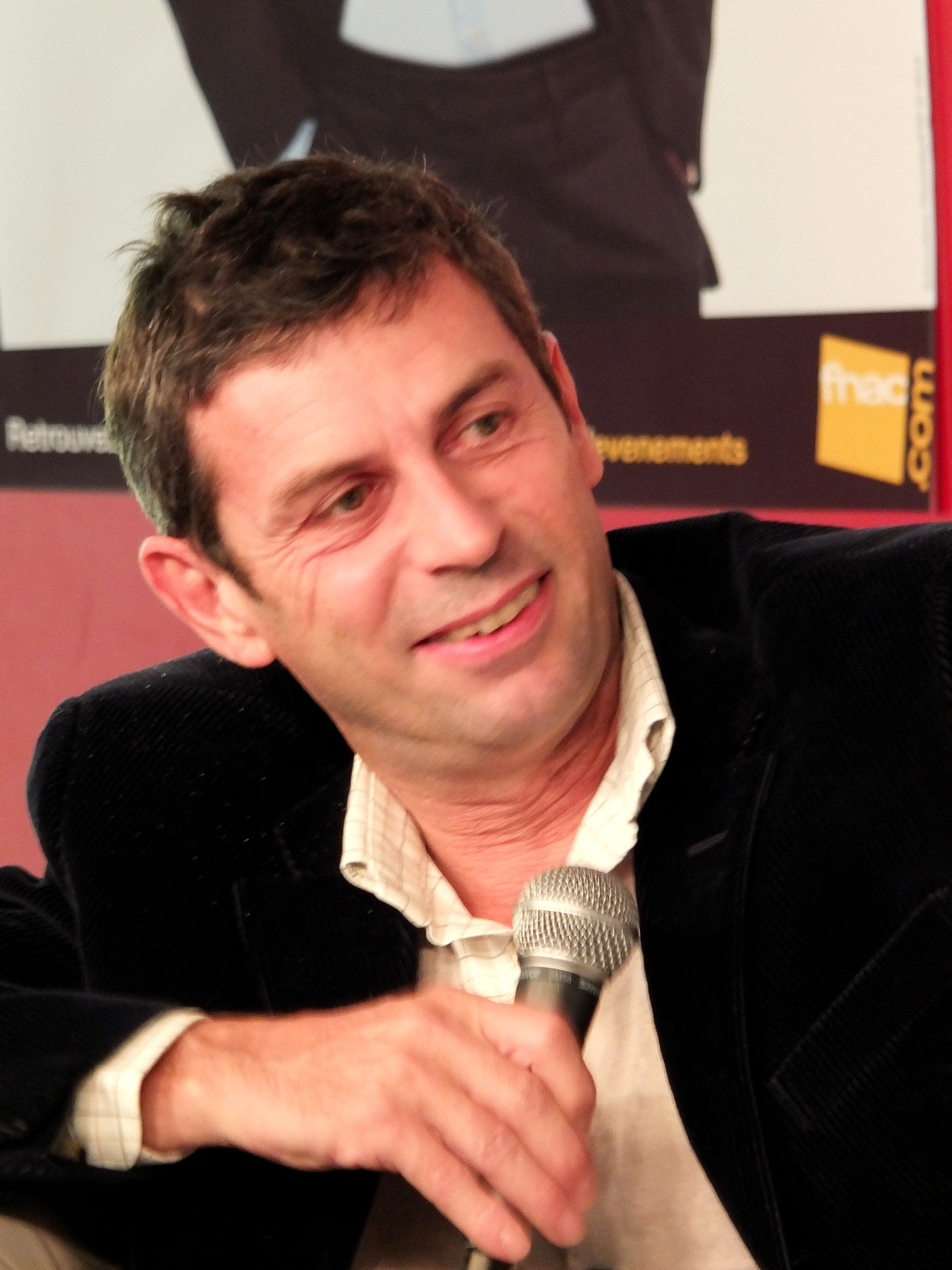
- Taddeï in 2012
- Born: 5 January 1961 (age 65); Paris, France
- Partner: Claire Nebout
- Presenting career
- Show: Ce soir (ou jamais !); Interdit d'interdire
- Stations: France 3, RT France
- Network: France Télévisions, RT
- Country: France

Frédéric Taddeï (born 5 January 1961) is a French journalist and television and radio host.

Taddeï grew up in Boulogne-Billancourt, a Parisian suburb. From 1997 to 2006, he hosted the late night programme Paris Dernière broadcast on the cable television station Paris Première. From 2006 to 2016, Taddeï hosted the cultural talk show Ce soir (ou jamais !) first on France 3 and then on France 2 from 2013, both public television stations. From 2005 to 2011, he also hosted several radio shows on Europe 1.

Taddeï later hosted Interdit d'interdire from 2018 until 2022 on the French-language version of the Russian state-controlled television network RT, when he resigned shortly before Russia invaded Ukraine out of "loyalty towards France".

== Controversies ==
Taddeï has been criticised by other French journalists and public figures like Caroline Fourest and Patrick Cohen because of his vision of freedom of speech. In his television show Ce soir (ou jamais !) he invited controversial French personalities such as Dieudonné, Alain Soral, Jean Bricmont, and Marc-Édouard Nabe. These figures are accused by their critics of having antisemitic opinions; Taddeï was criticised for giving them a platform, even though no complaints were ever made about anything that was aired in eight years of broadcasting, except when Mathieu Kassovitz expressed his doubts about 9/11. Taddeï and Ce soir (ou jamais !) have been defended by personalities such as Bernard Pivot, Régis Debray and Alain Jacubowicz (president of the LICRA, the French League Against Racism and Antisemitism).
