= Hachette Filipacchi Médias =

Magazine publishing company

- Industry: investment funds and similar financial entities
- Founded: 1826
- Founder: Louis Hachette
- Defunct: 21 January 2008
- Headquarters: Paris, France
- Parent: Lagardère Active
- Website: https://www.hachette.com/en/

Hachette Filipacchi Médias, S.A. (HFM) is a magazine publisher. It is a wholly owned subsidiary of Lagardère Active, a division of the media conglomerate Lagardère Group of France.

== History ==
Hachette was founded by Louis Hachette (French pronunciation: [a.ʃɛt]) Brédifin 1826 when he purchased the Librairie Brédif; the company later became L. Hachette et Compagnie.

Hachette was purchased by Matra in 1980, a firm associated with Ténot & Filipacchi. Hachette Filipacchi was nationalised in 1981 but remained a publicly traded firm. It is a subsidiary of Lagardère Media, acquired in 2004.

== Publications ==
Hachette Filipacchi Media publishes Parents, and Le Journal du Dimanche. It also published Paris Match until October 2024, when it was sold by Lagardère to LVMH.

From 1985 the company also publishes various titles abroad. Hachette sold its international titles to Hearst in 2011.
