= Sonia Mabrouk =

French journalist

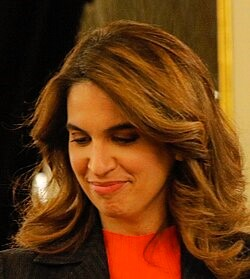
- Sonia Mabrouk in February 2023
- Born: 1977 (age 48–49); Tunis, Tunisia
- Occupation: Journalist
- Employer(s): CNews, Europe 1

Sonia Mabrouk (Arabic: سنية مبروك, romanized: Sanīyah Mabrūk; born 1977) is a Tunisian-born French journalist. After first embarking on an academic career in Tunisia, in 2005 she turned to journalism, writing for the magazine Jeune Afrique. In 2009, she was engaged by the French parliamentary television channel Public Sénat and later hosted political programmes on the radio station Europe 1. In 2017, Mabrouk published her first book Le monde ne tourne pas rond, ma petite-fille.

== Early life ==
Born 1977 in Tunis, Sonia Mabrouk was brought up as an only child in an upper class Tunisian family with connections to President Habib Bourguiba. Her grandfather Mongi Mabrouk was Tunisia's trade minister and her uncle Hédi Mabrouk was a diplomat and foreign minister. After graduating from high school when she was 16, she studied at the Carthage High Commercial Studies Institute, IHEC, graduating in 2002. When she was 20, she earned a master's degree at the Panthéon-Sorbonne University with a thesis on marketing (2004).

== Career ==
After initially spending three years in Tunis as a lecturer at the IHEC, in 2005 she moved to Paris where she first worked as a journalist for Jeune Afrique, conducting interviews with politicians. In 2008, she was hired by Jean-Pierre Elkabbach to become an interviewer on the parliamentary television channel Public Sénat. Despite lack of experience, she quickly made her mark. In 2013, she hosted programmes on the radio station Europe 1, in particular the popular Le Débat des Grandes Voix featuring discussions with political figures. From September 2017, she joined Canal+ where she was one of the hosts on the news programme Voix de l'Info on CNews.

In addition to journalism, Mabrouk published her first book, the conversational Le monde ne tourne pas rond, ma petite-fille in 2017, followed by the novel Dans son cœur sommeille la vengeance in 2018. Both works deal with Islamic terrorism, one of her favourite subjects.

== Personal life ==
She gave birth to a daughter, Soraya, on July 26, 2024; the identity of the father was kept a secret.
