= Europe 1 =

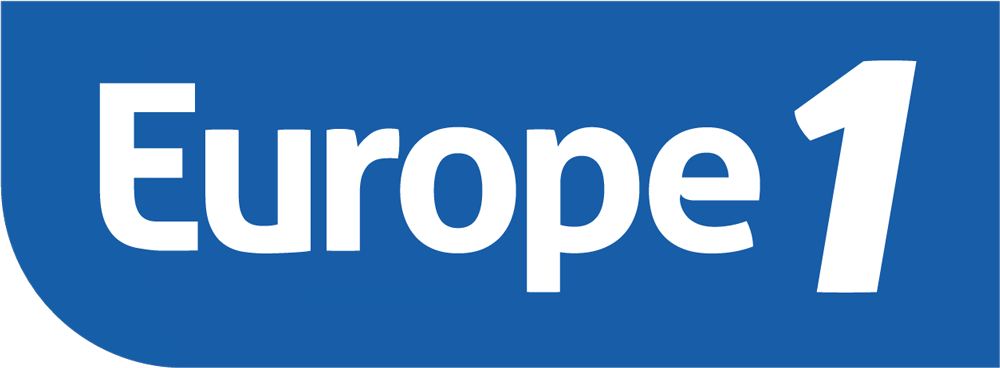
- Paris and Geneva; France
- Broadcast area: France, Switzerland and Belgium
- Frequencies: 104.7 MHz (Paris); 104.8 MHz (Marseille); 104.6 MHz (Lyon); Full list of frequencies in other areas

Programming
- Language: French
- Format: News and talk

Ownership
- Owner: Lagardère News
- Sister stations: Europe 2 RFM

History
- First air date: 1 January 1955; 71 years ago
- Former call signs: Europe n° 1 (1955–1974)

Links
- Website: www.europe1.fr

Europe 1, (Europe un) formerly known as Europe nº 1, is a privately owned radio station created in 1955. It was owned and operated by Lagardère News, a subsidiary of the Lagardère Group. Europe 1 was one of the leading radio broadcasting stations in France and its programmes were received nationwide. In January 2022, the right-wing populist media mogul Vincent Bolloré took over the station.

== History ==
In 1955, to circumvent the prohibition of commercial broadcasting in France after the Second World War, Europe n° 1 was established in the Saarland, a German state that borders France and Luxembourg. Transmissions were not legally authorised, however, until France's post-war administration of the Saarland ceased and sovereignty returned to West Germany in 1957; so, during its first two years (1955–1957), under the direction of Louis Merlin, who had defected from Radio Luxembourg, Europe n° 1 was a pirate radio station. In 1959 the French government bought part of the broadcasting corporation, and this interest was administered today by the Lagardère Group. All programming has always been produced in Paris. For the few parts of France who can't receive the FM signal, longwave broadcast still exists : the programme feed is transferred over ISDN lines to the transmitting station situated on the territory of the villages of Berus and Felsberg in the Saarland, Germany.

From its beginning, Europe n°1's priorities were two-fold: first, news and cultural information with an emphasis on eyewitness accounts rather than an announcer with a script; second, shows aimed at establishing bonds with listeners, including plays, contests, informal talk, popular music, and street-level politics. In both respects, it was a departure from radio formats of the day.

In the 1960s, Europe 1 pioneered a new tone in French radio. Salut les copains became an icon of popular culture and the baby boom generation. Europe 1 played a role in the May 68 political crisis by being the principal source of information untainted by government sanction; it was nicknamed "barricade radio". In the 1970s, President Giscard d'Estaing criticized its "mocking" tone. When the industrialist Jean-Luc Lagardère (mass media and military) became president of Europe 1 group, some feared the network might lose its independent point of view.

Europe 1 also became a supplementary active member of the European Broadcasting Union in 1978 and an active member in 1982.

Since the 1980s, Europe 1 has experienced decreases in audience, and average age of listeners has steadily increased. Both can be traced to the proliferation of FM radio, after socialist President François Mitterrand made FM private radio legal in 1981. In 1986, for equality, the regulation authorities gave FM frequencies to Europe 1 and other peripheral radios still emitting from outside France. A network of Europe 1 FM transmitters was established within France. They later had to be shared with Europe 2. In the 1990s, Europe 1 became a news and talk network. Jean-Pierre Elkabbach became president in 2005. He was dismissed by the CSA (Comité de Surveillance de l'Audiovisuel) after announcing the death of Pascal Sevran prematurely in June 2008 and was replaced by Alexandre Bompard, former Director of the Sports at Canal+.

In the 1990s, Europe 1 was France's fifth most popular network, with the other four being RTL (radio-television Luxembourg), France Inter (state-owned, general), NRJ (music) and France Info (state-owned, news). Then the right-wing media mogul Vincent Bolloré took over the station in January 2022.

== Programming ==
Over the last fifty years, the best-known programs on Europe 1 have included: 'Pour ceux qui aiment le jazz' ("For those who love jazz") hosted by Daniel Filipacchi and Franck Ténot, 'Signé Furax' ("Signed, Furax", a comic adventure serial), 'Salut les copains' ("Hi, friends", a pop music programme), 'Campus' (book reviews, interviews with literary personalities, and chat about current events and culture), 'Vous êtes formidables' (a programme devoted to "demonstrations of solidarity"), 'Bonjour, monsieur le maire' (aimed at rural France), 'L'horoscope de Madame Soleil' (astrology), 'Top 50' (a reprise of the musical charts), and 'Le club de la presse' ("Press Club", political conversation). BBC Radio 5 had a translated version of Top 50 called Le Top (with Marc et La Mèche) from 1990 to 1994.

Noted journalists, presenters, and performers have included: Patrick Topaloff, Maurice Siegel, Jean Gorini, André Arnaud, Pierre Bouteiller, Pierre Bellemare, Francis Blanche, Daniel Filipacchi, Frank Ténot, Lucien Morisse, Robert Willar, Albert Simon, Laurent Ferrari and Madame Soleil. Former is Wendy Bouchard. She was succeeded by Laurence Ferrari in 2014.

In June 2021, Vincent Bolloré, the then new owner of Europe 1, presented the new programming of Europe 1, which revealed an alignment of the station's programming with the news channel CNews, including a joint show presented by Laurence Ferrari.

This announcement led to a strike by the employees of Europe 1 expressing the concern that the station would lose its journalistic independence and become influenced by partisan politics.

Under Bolloré's ownership, Europe 1 and other entities in his media empire have tilted towards the far-right. During the campaign for the 2024 French legislative election, conspiratorial polemicist Cyril Hanouna was invited to host two-hour daily radio show, On marche sur la tête, on Europe 1 in addition to hosting Touche pas à mon poste ! on C8, half of whose viewers voted for the far-right in the European Parliament elections and during which he has made controversial statements leading to fines of €7.5 million. Journalists interviewed by franceinfo claimed that they were told to report on stories reflecting the official editorial line desired by Bolloré, including a particular focus on crimes committed by illegal immigrants and a ban on referring to the National Rally or Reconquête as far-right parties, while mandating that La France Insoumise be referred to as far-left. Two days after the launch of the show, the Regulatory Authority for Audiovisual and Digital Communication issued a first warning to Europe 1 for significantly overrepresenting far-right guests.

== Europe 1 on longwave ==
Europe 1 has been broadcast in France, from France, through a dense FM network since 1986, but the station was also broadcast on longwave by Europe 1's longwave transmitter from 1955 until the end of 2019. The longwave feed was transmitted by Europäische Rundfunk- und Fernseh-AG (European Radio and Television Company), broadcasting on longwave on 183 kHz from Felsberg in the Saarland, Germany on 183 kHz.

For longwave, the Felsberg antenna system beamed Europe 1's signal southwestward towards France. In the easterly direction, transmissions were attenuated, so, in Eastern Europe, there were a weak signal. Following the collapse of one mast in the four-mast phased array on 8 October 2012, the two-mast reserve antenna was used, resulting in a reduced signal in parts of France but a stronger and undistorted signal in northern Europe and the British Isles.

Carrier frequencies on the longwave band are assigned as integer multiples of nine kHz ranging from 153 to 279 kHz. However, the Europe 1 transmitter's frequency, 183 kHz, was offset from the usual nine kHz multiples established under the Geneva Plan.

At the transmitter site Felsberg, four guyed antenna masts were build in 1954 and 1955 with a average 277 metres in height. The building where the transmitters were housed is an architecturally unusual, prestressed-concrete construction that needs no internal supporting columns. It has been designated an architectural monument by the European Union and is a protected structure.

It was reported on 23 December 2019 that an email from Lagardère Active had confirmed that the longwave service of Europe 1 would cease transmission at midnight CET on 1 January 2020. In the event, Europe 1 longwave transmission ceased on 31 December 2019 at 23:30 CET.

== Visual identity ==
=== Logos ===
First old logo of Europe 1 from 1955 until 1965.

Old logo of Europe 1 from 1965 until 2001.

Old logo of Europe 1 from 2001 until 2005.

Old logo of Europe 1 from 2005 until 2010.

Old logo of Europe 2010 until 2022.

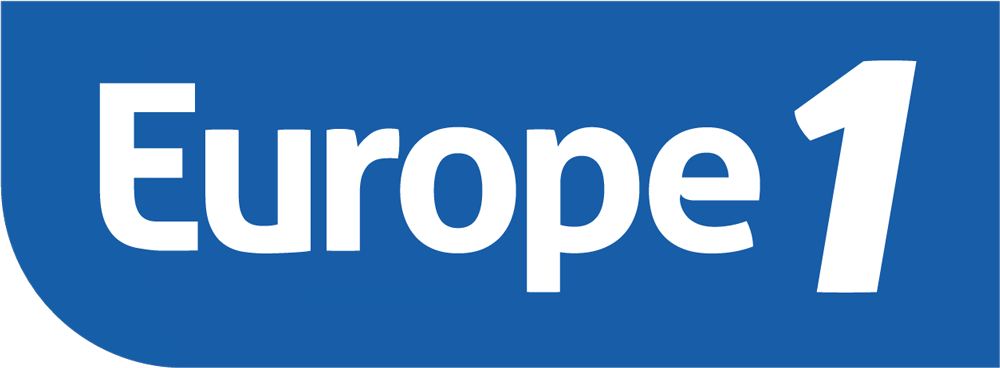
The logo of Europe 1 since 1 September 2022.

== Hosts ==
- Fanny Agostini
- Stéphane Bern
- Wendy Bouchard
- Julian Bugier
- Nicolas Canteloup
- Benoit Clair
- Michel Denisot
- Olivier Duhamel
- Christophe Hondelatte
- Régis Le Sommier
- Sonia Mabrouk
- Catherine Nay
- Anne Roumanoff

=== Former presenters ===
- Nikos Aliagas (2011–2019)
- Arthur (1992–1996)
- Laurent Baffie (2007–2011)
- Pierre Bellemare (1955–1986)
- Maurice Biraud
- Faustine Bollaert (2004–2012)
- Denis Brogniart (1991–2006)
- Daphné Bürki (2017–2018)
- Benjamin Castaldi (2000–2004)
- Coluche (1978-1979 then 1985-1986)
- Jean-Luc Delarue (1987–1995)
- Alexandre Delpérier (2008–2010)
- Michel Drucker (1983-1987 then 2008-2013)
- Franck Ferrand (2003–2018)
- Daniel Filipacchi (1955–1968)
- Marc-Olivier Fogiel (2008–2011)
- Cyril Hanouna (2013–2016)
- Christian Jeanpierre (2006–2008)
- Julia Martin (2006–2017)
- Christian Morin (1972–1987)
- Nagui (2009–2011)
- Jacques Rouland (1978–1984)
- Willy Rovelli (2009–2017)
- Alexandre Ruiz (2008–2011)
- Laurent Ruquier (1999–2014)
- Eugène Saccomano (1996–2001)
- Alessandra Sublet (2014–2015, 2016-2017)
- Frédéric Taddeï (2005–2011)
- Frank Ténot (1955–1968)

==== Former journalists ====
- David Abiker (2010–2019)
- Yves Calvi (1996–2005)
- Aymeric Caron (2009–2011)
- Arlette Chabot (2011–2015)
- Yves Coppens (Summer 2018)
- Antoine Cormery (1991)
- Jean-Claude Dassier (1968–1985)
- Nicolas Demorand (2010–2011)
- Marie Drucker (2008–2010)
- Guillaume Durand (1978–1987, 1999-2004, 2007–2008)
- Benoît Duquesne (1982-1988 then 2007-2008)
- Jean-Pierre Elkabbach (1981–2016)
- Raphaël Enthoven (2015–2018)
- Michel Field (1995–2015)
- Ivan Levaï (1972–1987)
- Nathalie Levy (2019–2020)
- Jean-Marc Morandini (2003–2016)
- Étienne Mougeotte (1968 puis 1974 - 1981)
- Géraldine Muhlmann (2017–2018)
- Natacha Polony (2012–2017)
- Eugène Saccomano (1970–2001)
- Anne Sinclair (2014–2016)
- Benjamin Vincent (2003–2009)

==== Former columnists ====
- Fabrice d'Almeida (2018–2019)
- Pierre Bellemare (2013–2015)
- Valérie Bénaïm (2013–2016)
- Daniel Cohn-Bendit (2013–2018)
- Jérôme Commandeur (2010–2018)
- Jean-Louis Debré (2016–2017)
- Nadia Daam (2017–2018)
- Estelle Denis (2015–2016)
- Louise Ekland (2016–2017)
- Jean-Pierre Foucault (2014–2016)
- Jérémy Michalak (2004–2014, 2016-2017)
- Didier Roustan (2017–2018)
- Julia Vignali (2016–2017)
- Ariel Wizman (2017–2018)

== See also ==
- Longwave transmitter Europe 1
- Transmitter Building Europe 1
- Telesaar
