= Eugène Saccomano =

French journalist and author (1936–2019)

- Born: 23 September 1936; Marseille, Bouches-du-Rhône, Provence-Alpes-Côte d'Azur, France
- Died: 7 October 2019 (aged 83); Suresnes, France
- Occupations: Journalist, author

Eugène Saccomano (23 September 1936 – 7 October 2019) was a French radio journalist and non-fiction author.

== Biography ==
Eugène Saccomano was born on 23 September 1936 in Marseille, southern France.

Saccomano started his career as a journalist for Le Provençal. In 1959, he published Bandits à Marseille, a book about thugs in Marseille. The book was adapted into the 1970 film Borsalino starring Alain Delon and Jean-Paul Belmondo.

He became a radio journalist for Europe 1 in 1970. He focused on sports, especially football. In 2001, he joined RTL, another radio station. In 2012, he joined Sport365, a sports TV channel. He wrote his autobiography, Je refais le match, in 2005.

== Bibliography ==
- Bandits à Marseille (Omnibus, 1959).
- Berlusconi, le dossier vérité (Éditions no 1, 1994).
- Goncourt 1932 (Paris: Flammarion, 1999).
- Je refais le match (Paris: Plon, 2005).
- Les Stars de l'euro 2008 (Éditions Numéro 1, 2008).
- Une romance marseillaise (Buchet Chastel, 2009).
- Les stars de la Coupe du Monde 2010 (Éditions Numéro 1, 2010).
- Le roman noir des Bleus (Éditions de la Martinière, 2010).
- Céline coupé en deux (Le Castor astral, 2013).
