= Daniel Filipacchi =

French media executive and collector of surrealist art (born 1928)

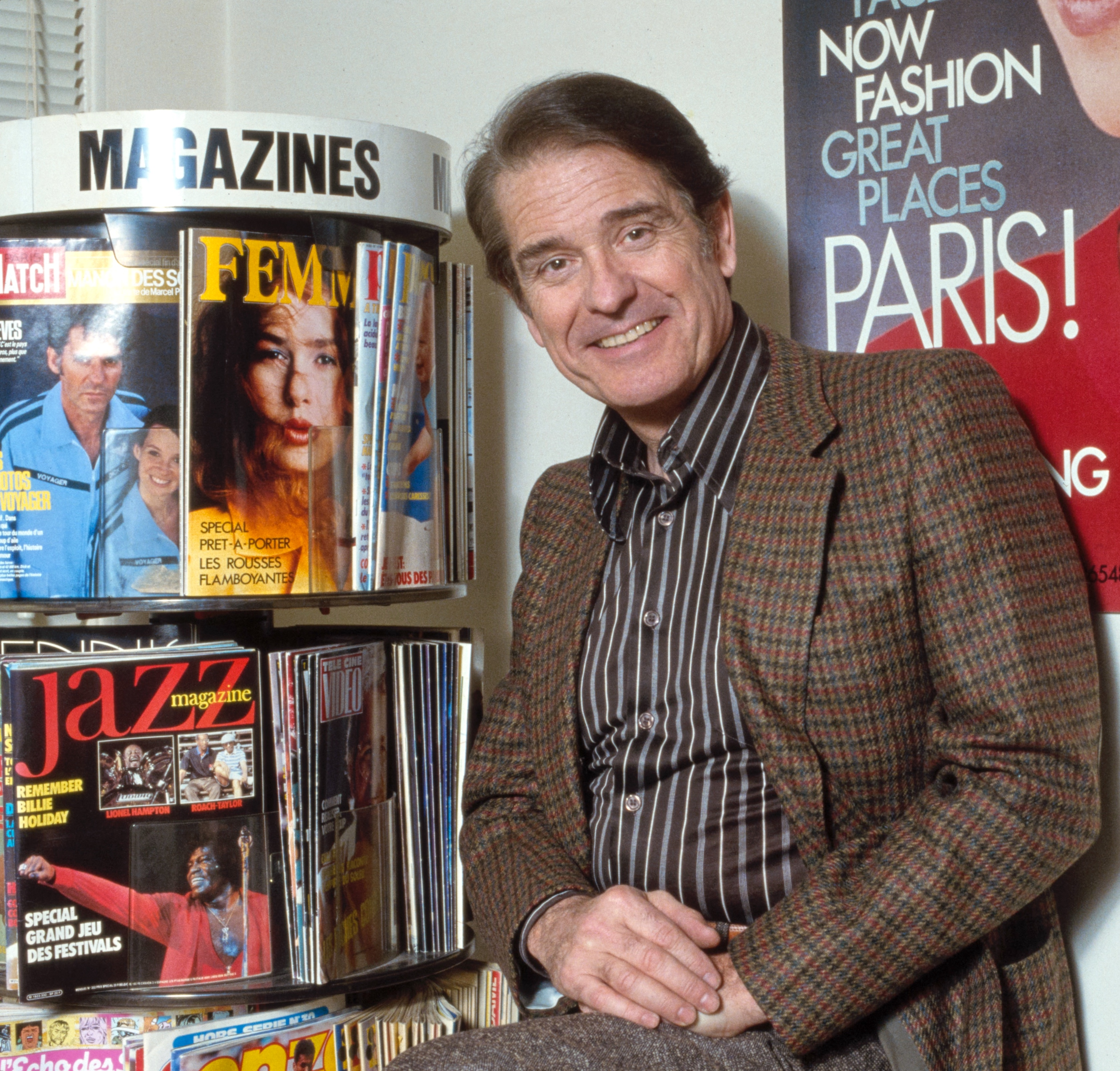
- Filipacchi in New York in 1988 with many of his magazines
- Born: 12 January 1928 (age 98); Paris, France
- Spouse: Sondra Peterson
- Children: 3, including Amanda

Daniel Filipacchi (born 12 January 1928) is the Chairman Emeritus of Hachette Filipacchi Médias and a French collector of surrealist art.

== Career ==
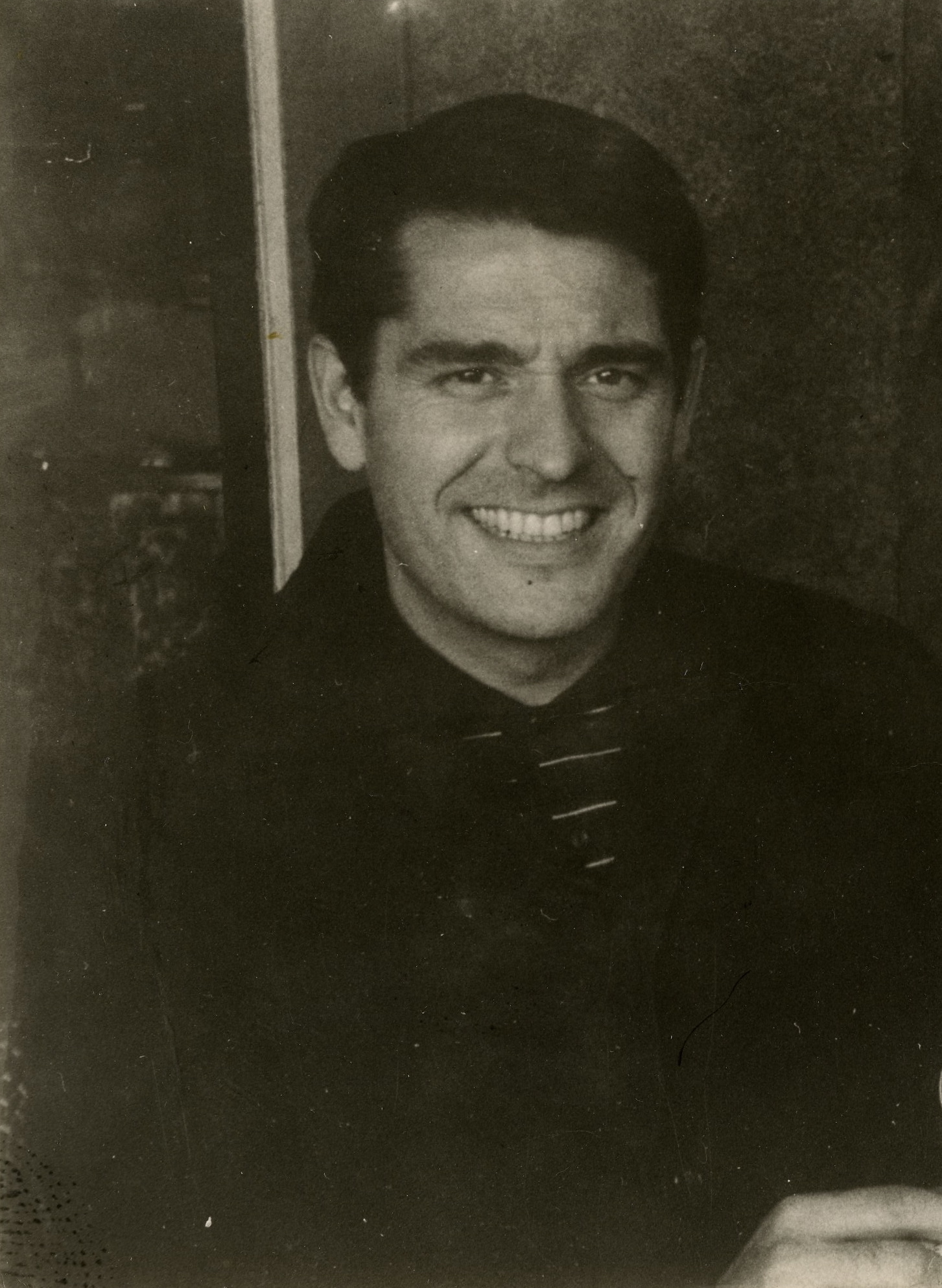
Filipacchi in 1958

Filipacchi wrote and worked as a photographer for Paris Match from its founding in 1949 by Jean Prouvost. Filipacchi later claimed never to have enjoyed taking photographs, despite earning early notoriety as a "well-mannered paparazzo". While working at Paris Match and as a photographer for another of Prouvost's titles, Marie Claire, Filipacchi promoted jazz concerts and ran a record label. In the early 1960s, at a time when jazz was not played on government-owned French radio stations, Filipacchi (a widely acknowledged jazz expert) and Frank Ténot hosted an immensely popular show on Europe 1 called Pour ceux qui aiment le jazz ("For those who love jazz").

In the 1960s, he presented a rock and roll radio show modeled after Dick Clark's American Bandstand and called Salut les copains, which launched the musical genre of yé-yé. The show's success led to his creation of a magazine of the same name. The latter was eventually renamed as Salut! and built a circulation of one million copies. Filipacchi played American and French rock music on this radio show beginning in the early 1960s. Both he and this show are credited with playing important roles in the formation of the 1960s youth culture in France.

Filipacchi acquired the venerable Cahiers du cinéma in 1964. Cahiers was in serious financial trouble and its owners appealed to Filipacchi to buy a majority share in order to save it from ruin. He hired a number of new people and redesigned the journal to look more modern, zippy, and youth-appealing. The revolutionary May 1968 events in France affected the subsequent evolution of Cahiers into a more political forum, under the influence of Maoist director Jean-Luc Godard and others. Filipacchi lost interest in the magazine and sold his share in 1969.

But he remained involved in that world, starting more magazines and acquiring others, such as Paris Match in 1976. He owned specialty magazines, for instance, some were for teenage girls (such as Mademoiselle Age Tendre) and others for men (such as Lui), which Filipacchi had founded in 1963 with Jacques Lanzmann. He also acquired Newlook and French editions of American magazines Playboy and Penthouse.

In February 1979 Filipacchi bought the then-defunct Look. He hired Jann Wenner to run it in May 1979 but the revival was a failure, and Filipacchi fired the entire staff in July 1979.

== Art collecting ==
ARTnews has repeatedly listed Filipacchi among the world's top art collectors. Art from Filipacchi's collection formed part of the 1996 exhibit Private Passions at the Musée d'Art Moderne de la Ville de Paris. His collection (along with that of his best friend, the record producer Nesuhi Ertegün) was exhibited at the Guggenheim in New York in 1999 in Surrealism: Two Private Eyes, the Nesuhi Ertegun and Daniel Filipacchi Collections - an event described by The New York Times as a "powerful exhibition", large enough to "pack the Solomon R. Guggenheim Museum from ceiling to lobby".

Although Filipacchi sued the Paris gallery which sold him a fake "Max Ernst" painting in 2006 for US$7 million, he called its notorious forger Wolfgang Beltracchi (freed on 9 January 2015 after serving three years in prison for his forgeries) a "genius" in a 2012 interview.

== Personal life ==
His father, Henri Filipacchi, who was born in İzmir, Turkey, descended from shipowners from Venice, hence the Italian family name. Filipacchi has three children. The eldest of these, Mimi, was from an early marriage. He then had two children with fashion model Sondra Peterson: Craig and novelist Amanda Filipacchi.
