= Paris Match =

French weekly news magazine

- Alexandre Coste, son of Albert II of Monaco, on the cover of Paris Match, 21 October 2003
- Editor-in-chief: Jérôme Béglé
- Categories: News magazine
- Frequency: Weekly
- Total circulation (2020): 568,115
- Founded: 1949
- First issue: 25 March 1949; 76 years ago
- Company: LVMH
- Country: France
- Based in: Paris
- Language: French
- Website: www.parismatch.com
- ISSN: 0397-1635

Paris Match (French pronunciation: [paʁi matʃ]) is a French-language weekly magazine that features a mix of news and pop culture. It covers major national and international news along with celebrity lifestyle features and photo reporting. Paris Match has been considered "one of the world's best outlets for photojournalism". Its content quality was compared to the American magazine Life. Paris Match's original slogan was "Le poids des mots, le choc des photos" ("The weight of words, the shock of photos"), which was changed to "Life is a true story" in 2008. The magazine was sold by Lagardère to LVMH in 2024.

== History and profile ==
A sports news magazine, Match l'intran (a play on L'Intransigeant), was launched on 9 November 1926 by Léon Bailby. It was acquired by the Louis-Dreyfus group in 1931 and then by the industrialist Jean Prouvost in 1938. Under Prouvost the magazine expanded its focus beyond sports, to a format reminiscent of Life: Le Match de la vie ("The Match of Life") and then Match, l'hebdomadaire de l'actualité mondiale ("Match, the weekly of world news"). Following the outbreak of World War II it became Match de la guerre ("Match of War") in October 1939. Selling for 2 francs a copy, it reached a circulation of 1.45 million by November. Publication was halted on 6 June 1940, during the Battle of France.

The magazine was relaunched in 1949 with a new name, Paris Match. The magazine temporarily ceased publication between 18 May and 15 June 1968 upon the call for a strike by the Syndicat du Livre, the French printers' union.

In 1976, Daniel Filipacchi purchased the ailing Paris Match. It continues to be one of France's most successful and influential magazines. It is published weekly and was until October 2024 part of Hachette Filipacchi Médias, which is itself owned by the Lagardère Group.

On occasion, Paris Match has sold more than one million copies worldwide when covering major events, such as the first flight by a French astronaut, Patrick Baudry, aboard the U.S. Space Shuttle Discovery in June 1985. Benoît Clair, a senior writer for Paris Match, was the first journalist allowed to join the shuttle crew members from training until the departure for the launch pad at Cape Canaveral. A series of reports on the training was published in Paris Match on 22 April 1985, 17 June 1985 and 20 January 1986.

As of 1996 the magazine has adopted an independent political stance.

In February 2024, it was publicly disclosed that the luxury brand LVMH is in talks to purchase Paris Match from the media conglomerate Lagardère SA. LVMH purchased the magazine in October of 2024 for €120 million.

== Circulation ==
Paris Match had a circulation of 1,800,000 copies in 1958. The 1988 circulation of the magazine was 873,000, making it the best-selling news weekly in the country. In 2001 the weekly was the tenth-largest-circulation news magazine worldwide, with a 630,000 sale.

Paris Match had a circulation of 655,000 during the 2007–2008 period. In 2009 the magazine was the best-selling photonews magazine in France, with a circulation of 611,000 copies. Its circulation was 578,282 in 2014 and 568,115 in 2020.
