= Berus =

- Ortsteil of Überherrn
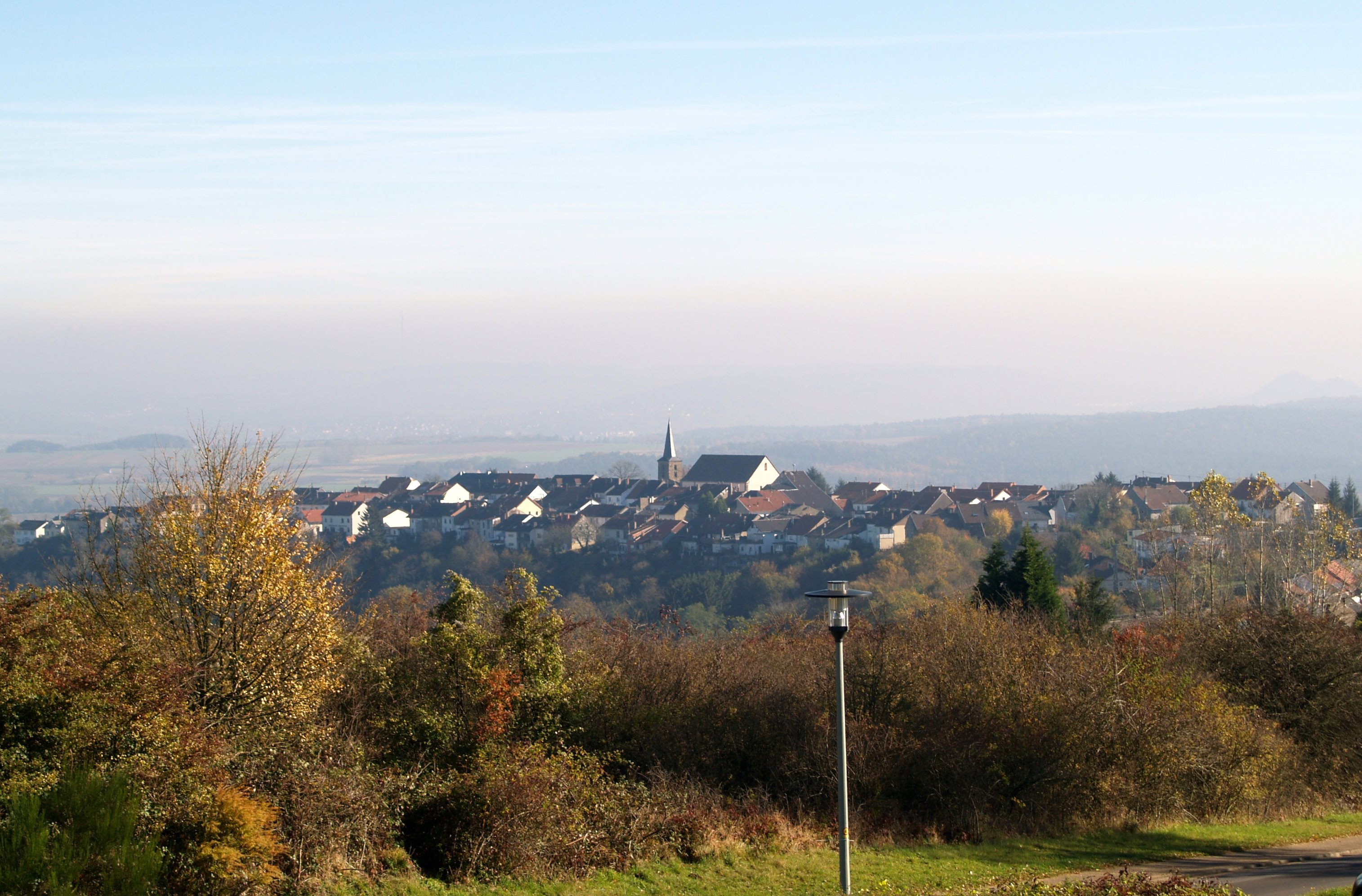

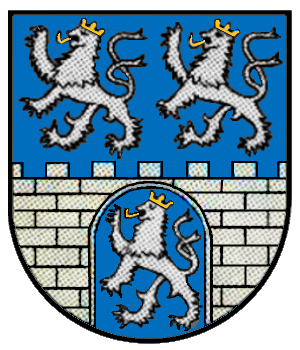
- Coat of arms
- Interactive map of Berus
- Location within Germany Location within Saarland
- Coordinates: 49°15′50″N 6°41′40″E
- Country: Germany
- State: Saarland
- District: Saarlouis
- Municipality: Überherrn

Area
  - Total: 11.80 km^{2} (4.56 sq mi)
- Elevation: 316 m (1,037 ft)

Population (2010-12-31)
  - Total: 2,053
  - Density: 174.0/km^{2} (450.6/sq mi)
- Time zone: UTC+01:00 (CET)
  - Summer (DST): UTC+02:00 (CEST)
- Postal codes: 66802
- Dialling codes: 06836

Berus is a village in the municipality of Überherrn in the district of Saarlouis, Saarland, southwestern Germany. Until December 1973, Berus was a municipality of its own.

== Geography and climate ==
The old centre of the village is situated on a spur of the Saargau overlooking the Saar valley, on the very border to Lorraine (France). The highest position is on 377 m absolute altitude. (Sauberg/French broadcast station Europe 1)

Berus has an oceanic climate (Köppen Cfb). The average annual temperature in Berus is 9.9 °C (49.8 °F). The average annual rainfall is 828.3 mm (32.61 in) with December as the wettest month. The temperatures are highest on average in July, at around 18.9 °C (66.0 °F), and lowest in January, at around 1.5 °C (34.7 °F). The highest temperature ever recorded in Berus was 37.8 °C (100.0 °F) on 25 July 2019; the coldest temperature ever recorded was −20.7 °C (−5.3 °F) on 2 February 1956.

Climate data for Berus (1991–2020 normals, extremes 1951–present)
Month	Jan	Feb	Mar	Apr	May	Jun	Jul	Aug	Sep	Oct	Nov	Dec	Year
Record high °C (°F)	15.0 (59.0)	20.3 (68.5)	24.6 (76.3)	26.8 (80.2)	30.8 (87.4)	35.5 (95.9)	38.2 (100.8)	37.8 (100.0)	32.4 (90.3)	25.9 (78.6)	21.6 (70.9)	16.6 (61.9)	38.2 (100.8)
Mean daily maximum °C (°F)	3.9 (39.0)	5.5 (41.9)	10.1 (50.2)	14.8 (58.6)	18.5 (65.3)	21.5 (70.7)	24.4 (75.9)	23.9 (75.0)	19.2 (66.6)	13.7 (56.7)	8.0 (46.4)	4.3 (39.7)	13.9 (57.0)
Daily mean °C (°F)	1.5 (34.7)	2.3 (36.1)	5.9 (42.6)	9.7 (49.5)	13.4 (56.1)	16.5 (61.7)	18.9 (66.0)	18.5 (65.3)	14.3 (57.7)	9.9 (49.8)	5.3 (41.5)	2.2 (36.0)	9.9 (49.8)
Mean daily minimum °C (°F)	−0.5 (31.1)	−0.4 (31.3)	2.3 (36.1)	5.3 (41.5)	8.9 (48.0)	12.0 (53.6)	14.2 (57.6)	14.0 (57.2)	10.4 (50.7)	6.8 (44.2)	3.1 (37.6)	0.1 (32.2)	6.3 (43.3)
Record low °C (°F)	−17.4 (0.7)	−20.7 (−5.3)	−12.6 (9.3)	−6.3 (20.7)	−3.2 (26.2)	1.6 (34.9)	4.6 (40.3)	5.0 (41.0)	1.7 (35.1)	−4.7 (23.5)	−10.6 (12.9)	−16.1 (3.0)	−20.7 (−5.3)
Average precipitation mm (inches)	79.7 (3.14)	64.6 (2.54)	57.6 (2.27)	44.6 (1.76)	68.7 (2.70)	67.3 (2.65)	64.3 (2.53)	65.6 (2.58)	63.3 (2.49)	73.5 (2.89)	73.6 (2.90)	94.6 (3.72)	828.3 (32.61)
Average precipitation days (≥ 0.1 mm)	18.5	16.3	15.2	13.5	14.3	14.2	13.1	14.3	12.6	16.6	17.5	19.1	182.5
Average relative humidity (%)	89.0	83.8	75.4	69.4	71.9	71.2	68.4	71.0	76.8	86.3	90.8	91.2	77.9
Mean monthly sunshine hours	52.2	81.7	138.9	190.0	212.3	220.5	241.6	218.1	168.2	102.4	51.4	45.3	1,730.9
Source 1: NOAA
Source 2: DWD (extremes)
