= Les Chats Sauvages =

French rock and roll band

Les Chats Sauvages (The Wild Cats) was a French rock and roll band, that was formed in 1961. Together with Les Chaussettes Noires, they were among the first outfits to perform rock and roll music in France.

== Career ==
Les Chats Sauvages was originally composed of Dick Rivers (Hervé Forneri) on vocals, John Rob (Jean-Claude Roboly) on guitar, James Fawler (Gérard Roboly) on guitar, Jack Regard (Gérard Jaquemus) on bass, and Willy Lewis (Wiliam Taïeb) on drums. The later was successively replaced by Armand Molinetti, Dean Shelton and Andre Ceccarelli.

In February 1961, the British music magazine, NME, reported that their concert at the Palais des Sports de Paris, whilst headlining with Vince Taylor, had turned into a full-scale riot.

The departure of Rivers in the summer of 1962, who was replaced by Mike Shannon, affected the band's popularity, which nevertheless continued its career. They charted with the song "Derniers baisers", covered with success by C. Jérôme in 1986 and Laurent Voulzy in 2006.

In 1963, John Rob visited New York with the group's American manager, Andre M. Lauffer, a New York attorney, for the purpose of "making the rounds" of the popular television shows. They met with The Ed Sullivan Show producers and were promised consideration for a future appearance. The laws for overseas entertainers were restrictive and the group could not meet the requirements at that time.

Les Chats Sauvages broke up in 1964, before briefly reappearing twice, including an album release in 1982 with Dick Rivers, to celebrate the twentieth anniversary of their formation.

== Discography ==
=== Albums ===
- Les Chats Sauvages, Pathé-Marconi, 1961
- Les Chats Sauvages, Pathé-Marconi, 1962
- Les Chats Sauvages 1982, RCA, 1982
- Les Chats Sauvages Inédits & titres rares, (unreleased and rare tracks), Pathé-Marconi, 1987

=== Singles ===
- "Ma p'tite amie est vache" / "Le jour J" / "En avant l'amour" / "J'ai pris dans tes yeux" (Pathé, 1961)
- "Je veux tout ce que tu veux" / "Trois en amour" / "Toi l'étranger" / "Hey Pony" (Pathé, 1961)
- "Toi tu es bath pour moi" / "Dis-moi si c'est l'amour" / "Toi quel bonheur" / "Tu peins ton visage" (Pathé, 1961)
- "Sous le ciel écossais" / "Un p'tit je ne sais quoi" / "Les bras de l'amour" / "Laisse-moi rire" (Pathé, 1961)
- "Twist à Saint-Tropez" / "C'est pas sérieux" / "Oh Boy" / "Est-ce que tu le sais ?" (Pathé, 1961)
- "Est-Ce Que Tu Le Sais ? (What'd I Say?)" / "Jamais Tu Ne Feras Rien (Never Mind)" (Pathé, 1962)
- "Laissez-nous twister" / "Un cœur tout neuf" / "L'amour que j'ai pour toi" (Pathé, 1962)
- "Je reviendrai" / "Tout ce qu'elle voudra" / "Toute la nuit" / "Oh Lady" (Pathé, 1962)
- "Sherry" / "Mon copain" / "Derniers baisers" / "Tout le monde twiste" (Pathé, 1963)
- "John, c'est l'amour" / "Horizon" / "Emmène-moi" / "Judy, rappelle-moi" (Pathé, 1963)
- "Générique de 'le roi du village'" / "Thème d'Agnès" / "Venez, les filles!" / "!Moïse twiste!" (Pathé, 1963)
- "Dis-lui que je t'aime" / "Une fille comme toi" / "Quelle nouvelle" / "Allons, reviens danser" (Pathé, 1963)
- "Laisse-moi chanter" / "O Valérie" / "Elle t'aime" / "Moins d'une minute" (Pathé, 1963)
- "Jolie Fille" / "Seul" / "La Route" / "Ericka" (Pathé EG 759 1964)
- "Merci" / "Je suis prêt" / "Obsession" / "Malgré tout ça" (Pathé, 1964)
