= David Abiker =

French journalist (born 1969)

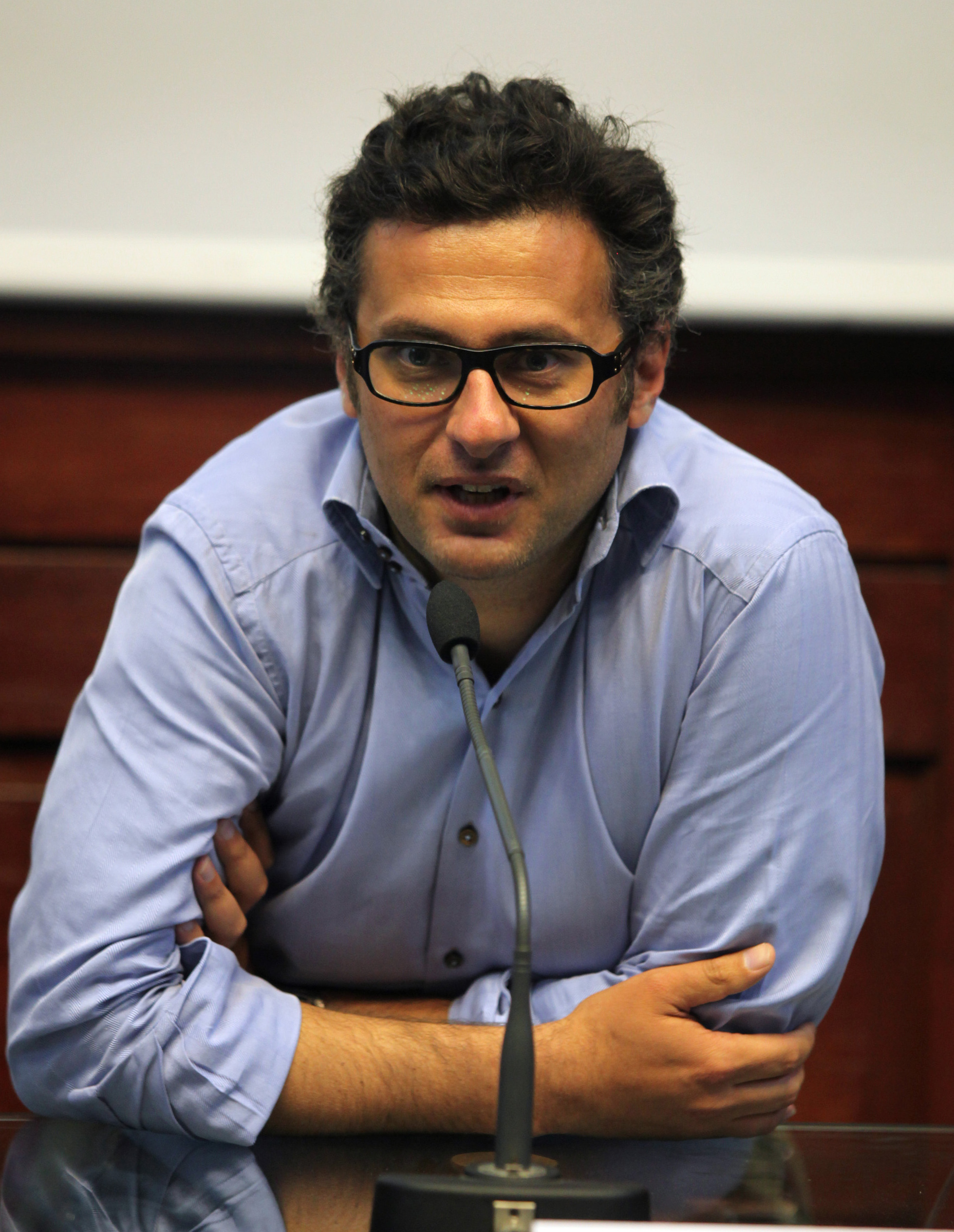
- Born: 11 February 1969 (age 57); Suresnes, France
- Education: Sciences Po
- Occupation: Journalist

David Abiker (born 11 February 1969 in Suresnes, France) is a French radio and television journalist. He graduated from Sciences Po.

== Biography ==
A 1991 graduate of the Paris Institute of Political Studies (Eco-Fi track), David Abiker contributed to the student weekly L'Indépendant de la Rue Saint-Guillaume while attending Sciences Po. He also earned a master’s degree and then a DEA in political science from the Paris-Panthéon-Assas University.
