= Frank Ténot =

Frank Ténot (31 October 1925 – 8 January 2004) was a French press agent, pataphysician, and jazz critic. He managed several publications throughout his long association with Daniel Filipacchi, a publisher of multiple magazines who had started as a photographer and jazz expert. Together, they founded the influential radio show Salut les copains, featuring rock and roll, and the spin-off magazine of the same name. It was later renamed as Salut!.

== Life ==
Ténot discovered jazz in Bordeaux in 1944, where he became president of the Hot Club of France. After World War II, he was based in Paris and employed at the Commission for Atomic Energy, and as a copy editor at the magazine Jazz Hot, alongside Boris Vian. Together, the two men discovered 'Pataphysics.

In the 1950s, he worked at the French Club label with Daniel Filipacchi, then a press photographer. He also worked with him at Jazz Magazine. Until he died in 2004, Ténot wrote a regular column in Jazzman and Jazz Magazine.

He and Filipacchi hosted a radio show on Europe 1, For Those Who Love Jazz, for sixteen years, from 1955 to 1971.

In 1959, he began airing Hi folks, which was highly successful with youth and resulted in developing a magazine of the same name. The two partners created a media group that included Lui, Pariscope, Union and Photo. They bought Paris Match in 1976 before joining forces with Matra and taking control of creating the Hachette Filipacchi Médias.

By 1986, Ténot participated in creating Europe 2. In 1999, he co-founded TSF Jazz with Jean-François Bizot.

Tenot tried to succeed in writing song lyrics with his partner, Daniel Filipacchi. They published under the pseudonym Daniel Frank: their Lil 'Darlin' was sung by Henri Salvador on air and accompanied by Count Basie. They also wrote the song Panne d'essence for Sylvie Vartan, under the pseudonym Dan Frank.

They produced Miles Davis, Louis Armstrong, and Sylvie Vartan concerts at the Olympia theatre in Paris.

Ténot presided over a management company, founded Éditions du Layeur, and was named "Provveditore" of the College Pataphysique.

Elected as mayor of the town of Marnay-sur-Seine in 1995, Ténot served until 2001. The Foundation Ténot supported artistic creation with the art center CAMAC in Marnay-sur-Seine.

== Works ==
- Dictionnaire du jazz, 1967
- Radios privées, radios pirates, 1977
- Jazz encyclopoche, 1977
- Le jazz, 1983
- Boris Vian Jazz à Saint-Germain, 1993
- Je voulais en savoir davantage, 1997
- Frankly speaking : chroniques de jazz, de 1944 à 2004, 2002
