= Ihn (Wallerfangen) =

- Village of Wallerfangen
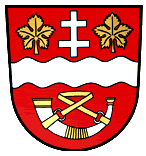
- Coat of arms
- Interactive map of Ihn
- Location within Germany Location within Saarland
- Coordinates: 49°19′24″N 6°36′18″E
- Country: Germany
- State: Saarland
- District: Saarlouis
- Municipality: Wallerfangen

Area
  - Total: 5.71 km^{2} (2.20 sq mi)
- Elevation: 211 m (692 ft)

Population (2008-12-31)
  - Total: 465
  - Density: 81.4/km^{2} (211/sq mi)
- Time zone: UTC+01:00 (CET)
  - Summer (DST): UTC+02:00 (CEST)
- Postal codes: 66798
- Dialling codes: 06837

Ihn (German pronunciation: [iːn]) is a village in Wallerfangen municipality, Saarlouis district, Germany. Until the end of 1973, it was an independent municipality.
