= Dick Rivers =

French actor and singer (1945–2019)

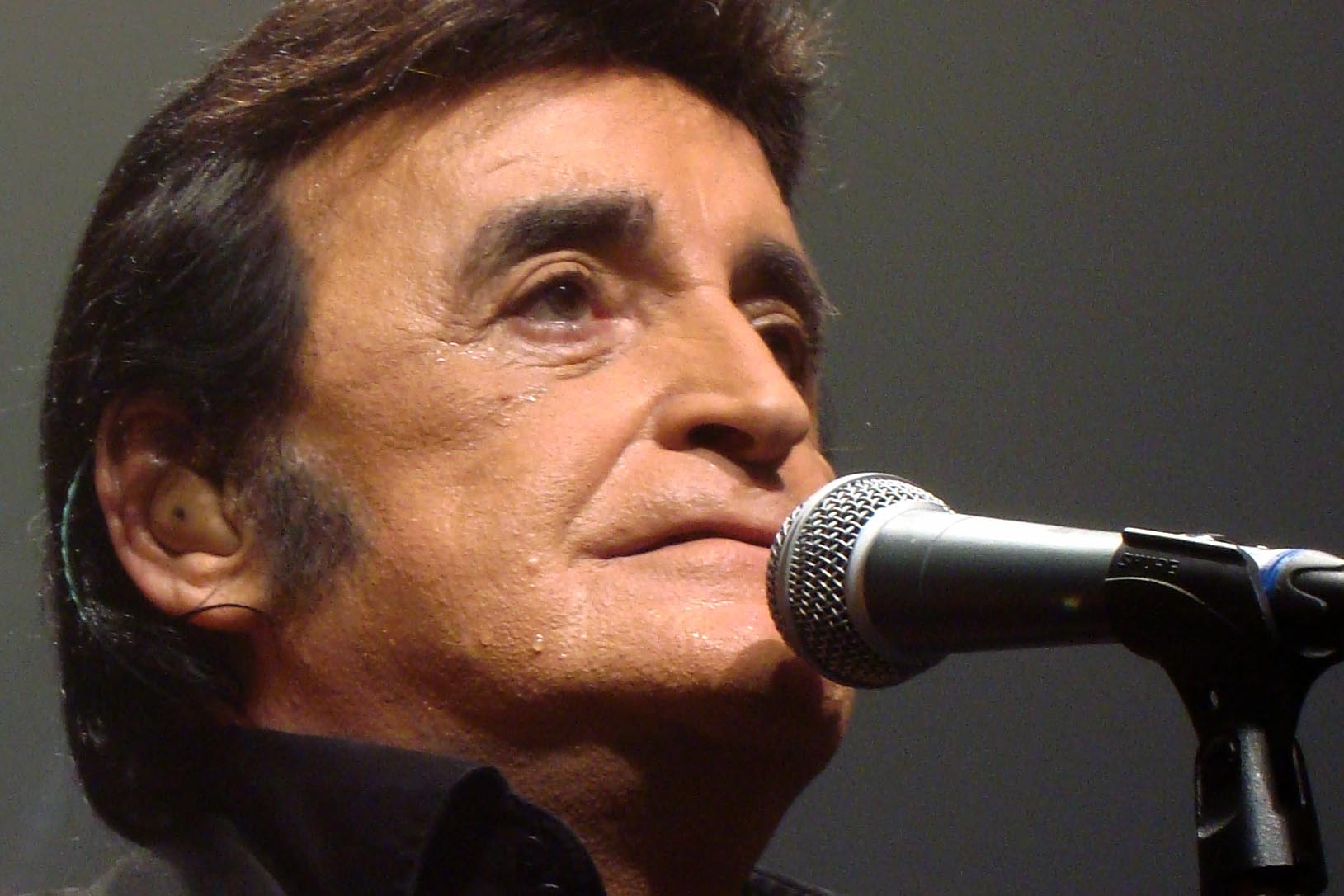

Background information
- Born: Hervé Forneri; 24 April 1945; Nice, France
- Died: 24 April 2019 (aged 74) Neuilly-sur-Seine, France
- Genres: Rock and roll
- Occupation: Singer
- Formerly of: Les Chats Sauvages

Hervé Forneri (French pronunciation: [ɛʁve fɔʁnɛʁi]; 24 April 1945 – 24 April 2019), known professionally as Dick Rivers, was a French singer and actor who began performing in the early 1960s. He was an important figure in introducing rock and roll music in France. He was an admirer of Elvis Presley, who influenced both his singing and looks. His stage name came from the character, Deke Rivers, that Presley played in his second film, Loving You (1957).

== Biography ==
Rivers was born in Nice, France. He started his music career in 1960 as the lead singer of the band Les Chats Sauvages, cutting his first record on his fifteenth birthday. In 1961, the British music magazine NME reported that a Rivers concert with his group Les Chats Sauvages at the Palais des Sports de Paris, whilst headlining with Vince Taylor, had turned into a full-scale riot. Rivers left Les Chats Sauvages in 1962 to pursue a solo career.

His last album, Rivers, was released in 2014.

He died in Neuilly-sur-Seine in 2019, from cancer, on his 74th birthday.

== Selected discography ==
- 1964 Rien que toi
- 1971 Bye Bye Lily
- 1971 Dick n'Roll
- 1972 The Rock Machine
- 1974 Rock & roll star
- 1976 Mississippi River's
- 1994 Very Dick (compilation album)
- 1995 Plein Soleil
- 1996 AuthenDick (live album)
- 1998 Vivre comme ça... entre la terre et l'amour
- 2001 Amoureux de vous
