= Yves Calvi =

French journalist and television presenter

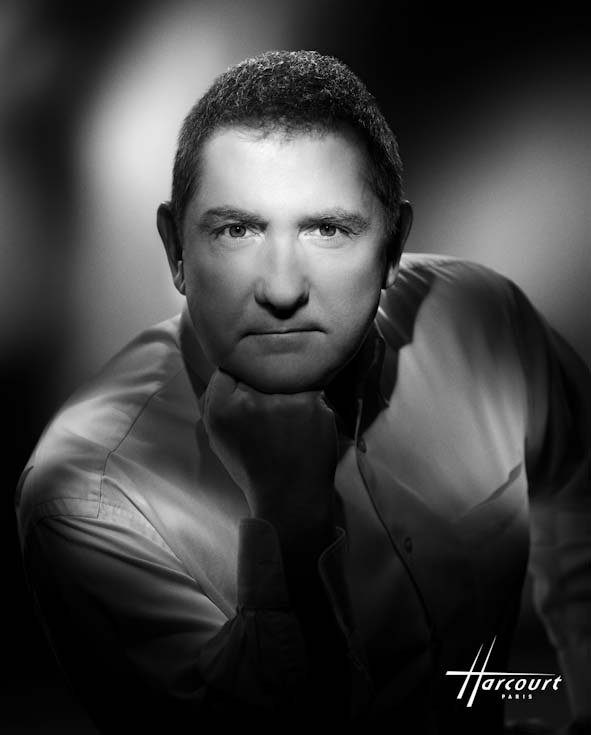
- Yves Calvi pictured in 2010 at Studio Harcourt.
- Born: Yves Krettly; 30 August 1959 (age 66); Boulogne-Billancourt, Hauts-de-Seine, France
- Occupations: Journalist, television presenter
- Years active: 1986–present
- Notable credit(s): C dans l'air Mots croisés L'Info du vrai
- Television: France 5 (2000–2016); France 2 (2005–2014); Canal + (2017–2021)
- Parent: Gérard Calvi

Yves Calvi (born Yves Krettly on 30 August 1959) is a French journalist and television presenter.

== Early career and education ==
Yves Calvi was born in Boulogne-Billancourt in the department of Hauts-de-Seine. He graduated in modern literature and was a former student at the Institut d'Études Politiques de Paris. He decided to change his family name and take the pseudonym of his father, composer and conductor Gérard Calvi, when he joined Radio France Internationale in 1986 and before joining France Info. He was close to one of the founders of France Info and joined him in 1994 when he rectified the station RMC and then Europe 1 two years later.

== Radio career ==
After becoming a television presenter on the local channel Télé Lyon Métropole, Yves Calvi became the familiar voice of the station Europe 1. He presented the discovery radio program Forum for six seasons from 1996 to 2002. He also presented a morning part from Monday to Friday and an afternoon part on Sunday for six seasons. He then presented the program Europe Midi for two seasons from 2003 to 2005. In September 2005, he left Europe 1 to become a television presenter again.

Yves Calvi joined France Inter in September 2007 in the new team to produce and present the new program Nonobstant from Monday to Friday. In 2008, he refused an offer from RTL proposing that he present the morning program; preferring to pursue presenting his own television programs. In August 2010, after leaving France Inter, he joined RTL to host a daily interview called Le choix d'Yves Calvi, pursuing his collaborations with France 5 and France 2.

== Television career ==
Since September 2001, he has hosted C dans l'air on France 5, a television program debating the news and current affairs. In September 2005, since leaving Europe 1, he again presents the bimonthly political program Mots croisés on France 2, succeeding Arlette Chabot, the new news director of the channel who created the monthly political program À vous de juger broadcast on the first part of the evening. Yves Calvi co-hosted the program Le grand tournoi de l'histoire on 27 December 2006 and on 20 February 2007 on France 3.

In April 2008, he questioned the French president Nicolas Sarkozy during a special program hosted by Patrick Poivre d'Arvor and David Pujadas, broadcast live from the Palais de l'Élysée on both TF1 and France 2. In June 2009, at the World Environment Day, he presented on France 2 the broadcast of Home, a documentary film directed by Yann Arthus-Bertrand, and then hosted a debate entitled Comment sauver la planète ?. In January 2010, he co-hosted with other presenters of France Télévisions the program Pour Haïti to help the victims of the 2010 Haiti earthquake broadcast on France 2 and France Inter.

== Bibliography ==
- Yves Calvi and Gilbert Bodinier, Souvenirs historiques du capitaine Krettly, Paris, Nouveau Monde editions, June 2003, 284 pages (ISBN 9782847360219)
