= Telesaar =

First German private television station

Telesaar is the designation of the first German private television station. It was brought in 1954 by the European Broadcast and Television AG, which also operates the transmitter of Europe 1. It broadcast on VHF channel 7 in the French standard until its annexation by West Germany.

This was permitted, because until the end of 1956 the Saarland was not part of the Federal Republic of Germany and therefore not subject to German broadcast laws. Although Telesaar used the French television standard, which German televisions could not receive, the German authorities shut down the Telesaar, and the transmitter had to be adjusted in the middle of 1958. Film material of what remains of the transmissions of Telesaar are in archives of the Saarländischer Rundfunk.

== History ==
The small autonomous state of Saarland, then independent from Germany since 1945 (until 1957) and in economic and customs union with France from 1947 to 1959, adopted a law on broadcasting on June 18, 1952, prepared since 1950. On October 24, Radiodiffusion Saaroise S.A.R.L. is founded whose partners are the Saarland State for two thirds and the Société Financière de Radiodiffusion (Sofirad) for one third, and whose supervisory board includes seven Saarlanders and four French people under the chairmanship of the French Director General of Asset Management Saarland, Frédéric Schlachter.

The general director of Saarland Radio, Frédéric Billmann, decides to establish a television station, but the financial means of his company do not allow him to cover the broadcasting costs, he turns to private operators, which is so unusual. On May 16, 1952, Telesaar/Saarländische Fernseh S.A. and the Saarland Television Production Company were founded. Their main shareholder is the Monegasque company Images et Sons founded by Charles Michelson and hereditary Prince Rainier III of Monaco with the aim of establishing a network of private broadcasting stations in France. This company then planned to operate a new broadcasting transmitter in Felsberg named Europe No. 1 in Saarland to create a “peripheral” radio station escaping the French broadcasting monopoly. In return for authorization from the Saar government for the construction of the transmitter, Images et Sons must install a television station for Télé-Sarre and deliver a free daily three-hour television program. The European Radio and Television Company, a subsidiary of Images et Sons, is therefore building a radio and television transmitter in Felsberg-Berus, 6 kilometers west of Saarlouis on the edge of the French border. Another transmitter located at the Eschberger Hof near Saarbrücken launched Télé-Sarre on the airwaves on December 23, 1953.

The channel had its own Tagesschau which was broadcast daily (the German bulletin of the same name only extended to a seven-day basis in October 1956). Filmed footage was sent from Paris, without sound, but with bulk text. The main edition was broadcast at 8pm and repeated live at 9:45pm before closedown.

Following the reintegration of Saarland into the Federal Republic of Germany in 1957, Telesaar became the country's leading commercial channel. The German Broadcasting Authority, which had controlled Saarland broadcasting since January 1, 1957, saw this channel as a breach of the public broadcasting monopoly which was the sole responsibility of the ARD. The transmitter was closed by the police on January 25, 1958, and on March 10, the Minister of Federal Post ordered the permanent closure of Telesaar in mid-July. Télé-Sarre therefore disappeared on July 15, 1958.
