= Julia Vignali =

French actress and television presenter (born 1975)

- Born: 13 July 1975 (age 49); Paris, France
- Occupation(s): Actress, television presenter
- Years active: 2000–present (television)
- Notable credit(s): Les Maternelles; Le Meilleur Pâtissier
- Television: Canal+ (2010–2012); France 5 (2012–2015); TF1 (2016–2017); M6 (2017–2021); France 2 (2021–present)

Julia Vignali (born 13 July 1975) is a French actress and television presenter.

== Career ==
After studying commerce at the Grenoble School of Management, Julia Vignali briefly worked for the marketing service of Polydor Records at Universal Music, before appearing in several advertisements.

From 2010 to 2012, she presented the weather at La Matinale on Canal+ and then presented Les Maternelles on France 5. She left the program three years later at the end of the 2015 season, replaced by Sidonie Bonnec. The same year, she joined the program C à vous on the same channel, where she is a replacing columnist, while Anne-Elizabeth Lemoine occasionally presents the program.

In September 2016, she is a columnist in the new radio program of Alessandra Sublet titled La Cour des grands and broadcast in the late afternoon on Europe 1. In October 2016, she joined TF1 to present with Laurent Mariotte the morning program #WEEKEND broadcast on every Saturday.

In October 2017, she replaced Faustine Bollaert on presenting the pastry contest Le Meilleur Pâtissier on M6 with Cyril Lignac and Mercotte. That same year, she participated at the special program 40 ans du Puy du Fou : Les animateurs font le spectacle, in which she portrayed one of the dancers from the show Mousquetaire de Richelieu.

On 22 October 2018, she presented at the second part of the evening on M6 a dating program titled Mon admirateur secret. On 30 December 2018, she co-hosted at the first part of the evening on M6 with Ophélie Meunier a retrospective of the year titled Ils ont fait 2018.

In 2021, she announced that she left the channel M6 to focus on film activities and also productions. She announced ending the presentation of Le Meilleur Pâtissier and Mon admirateur secret.

In May 2021, France 2 finally announced the arrival of Julia Vignali for September. Since 23 August 2021, she presents from Monday to Thursday with Thomas Sotto the morning program Télématin.

== Personal life ==
Julia Vignali was born in Paris to Italian parents from Parma in the region of Emilia-Romagna. She is the mother of a boy named Luigi, born in 2006. She married in 2012 a screenwriter named Julien, with whom she has a son. They separated in 2014. In February 2016, she and Kad Merad officialize their relationship at the ceremony of the Magritte Awards in Belgium.

== Television programs ==
- La Matinale as the weather host on Canal+ (2010–2012)
- Les Maternelles on France 5 (2012–2015)
- C à vous as a replacing columnist on France 5 (2015)
- #WEEKEND on TF1 (2016–2017)
- Le Meilleur Pâtissier on M6 (2017–2020)
- Télématin (2021–present)

== Filmography ==
=== Films ===
- Brillantissime (2018) ... the gynecologist
- La Ch'tite famille (2018) ... herself

=== Television series ===
- La vie devant nous (2000) ... Stéphanie
- Le Lycée (2001)
- Le 17 (2002)
- Avocats et Associés (2005)
- Belle et Zen (2007)
- Seconde Chance (2008–2009) ... Audrey Althuy
- Père et Maire (2009) ... secretary of Alexis Caron
