= Le Meilleur Pâtissier =

- Country of origin: France
- Original language: French

Le Meilleur Pâtissier (The Best Pastry Chef) is a French culinary reality show broadcast on M6 since 2012 and in Belgium on RTL-TVI1.

Adapted from the British show The Great British Bake Off, it is hosted by Laëtitia Milot. The jury consists of chef Cyril Lignac and culinary blogger Jacqueline Mercorelli, better known by her stage name "Mercotte". They are frequently joined by guest judges.

There have been fourteen seasons of the main show, in which amateur bakers compete to be crowned The Best Pastry Chef. There have also been two celebrity series, whose winners have published a recipe book; the book's proceeds are donated to the Fondation de France charitable organisation. 2017 saw the introduction of Le Meilleur Patissier: Les Professionnels, which involves professional pastry chefs in a format similar to the UK show's spin-off Bake Off: Crème de la Crème.

The broadcast is followed by an aftershow entitled Le Meilleur Pâtissier: À vos fourneaux (The Best Pastry Chef: To your ovens).

== Production and organisation ==
=== Filming ===
The main series is shot in the grounds of various French castles: the first and eleventh series at the Château de Neuville in Gambais, the fifth at the Château de Maillebois near Chartres and the rest at the Château de Groussay in Montfort-l'Amaury.

Since one episode takes two days to film, it takes six weeks in total to shoot each series.

=== Hosting and voice-over ===
Faustine Bollaert hosted the programme from the launch episode until the second celebrity special series in 2017 (Meilleur Pâtissier, spécial célébrités), just before her departure for France 2. Seasons 6 to 9 were hosted by Julia Vignali. Seasons 10 and 11 have been hosted by Marie Portolano.

Meanwhile, Nathalie Homs has consistently performed the voice-over.

=== Casting and selection of contestants ===
There are several phases involved in the programme's casting process. For each series, the production team receives between 4,000 and 5,000 applications along with candidates’ photos. After reviewing these, only 400 to 600 amateur bakers are selected to visit the production offices where on-camera casting is carried out. Would-be contestants arrive with two cakes. The first is a specific example of traditional French patisserie. The second is a personal creation. A shortlist of forty is selected and a "life-size" test then carried out in a professional kitchen in the presence of Mercotte and the host among others. Here, fourteen candidates emerge who will go on to participate in the programme.

Since season 9, one of the spots is reserved for the winner of En Route pour le Meilleur Pâtissier! (En route for The Best Pastry Chef!), which is a short competition featuring teenage bakers that takes place earlier in the summer.

== Judges ==
Cyril Lignac (from series 1)

Jacqueline Mercorelli, stage name "Mercotte" (from series 1, except for Les Professionnels)

Philippe Conticini (only in series 1 and 2 of Les Professionnels)

Pierre Hermé (only in Les Professionnels)

Frédéric Bau (only in series 1 of Les Professionnels)

Audrey Gellet (only in series 2 of Les Professionnels)

Benoît Blin (only in series 3 of Les Professionnels)

== Format ==
In each episode, amateur bakers compete in a series of timed individual challenges: Cyril's Challenge (le défi de Cyril), Mercotte's Technical Test (l'épreuve technique de Mercotte), and the Creative Test (l'épreuve créative). The best among them across all the challenges is named Pastry Chef of the Week (pâtissier/ère de la semaine). They are awarded the Blue Apron (le tablier bleu), which they get to wear during the next episode. The worst among them is eliminated from the competition. In the final episode, the winner is crowned Best Pastry Chef (le meilleur pâtissier), where they are awarded a trophy and the publication of their own recipe book.

Each episode's challenges are organized more or less along a broad theme, for instance a particular country or French region (e.g. India, the United States, Alsace, Bretagne), a cultural concept (school, rock and roll, vacation, cinema), or a particular story (Snow White, 1001 Nights, or French Fried Vacation 2 [Les Bronzés Font du Ski].) Perennial themes have become show traditions, like the sexy theme "50 shades of cream" (50 nuances de crème), or the regional rivalry pitting North vs South (Nord contre Sud).

There are no themes organized around types of baking. French language and culture distinguish pastry baking (pâtisserie) from bread baking (boulangerie), and this show only features the former. So for each challenge, the bakers must show mastery of different styles of pâtisserie--- cakes, gateaux, desserts, entremets, pies, tortes, etc., to make something fitting the theme and the limits of the challenge.

== The challenges ==
Each episode has three rounds, each testing distinct aspects of patisserie.

=== Cyril's Challenge / Le défi de Cyril ===
This challenge consists of contestants making their own recipes in line with a given theme, usually a particular foodstuff (like the lemon) or a traditional bake (like the tarte Tatin). However, Cyril expects the bakers to revisit classics, revamping them with the kinds of style, flavoring, and meticulous beauty that a professional pastry chef would employ. Oftentimes, Cyril demands a trompe-l'œil that resembles the foodstuff (like a pie that looks like an egg dish), rather than something merely incorporating it.

Contestants do not know what the challenge's theme will be until Cyril unveils it, but they are free to create on the spot any recipe they want with materials and ingredients at hand, or which they had previously brought with them. The judges and host interact with the contestants, and once they've judged the bakes, they announce their "top" ones along with their worst "flops."

=== Mercotte's Technical Test / L'épreuve technique de Mercotte ===
In this challenge, the bakers are tasked with making a particular bake by scrupulously following a recipe provided by Mercotte. These bakes can involve classic desserts of French patisserie, or the latest modern trends going around the internet. Mercotte's bakes tend to be less meticulous than Cyril's, while being more playful and casual with decoration and flavors. Their finishing touches often incorporate elements of Cake decorating (le cake-design).

As in the British original, the recipe is deliberately written with crucial details omitted, forcing the contestants to rely on their technique and know-how. Unlike the original show, Mercotte's recipes are often printed in creative and offbeat ways befitting the theme, such as calligraphy on a scroll or in a spiral on a record. They often come with long accompanying texts that at first seem completely extraneous but which prove to reveal critical information. Mercotte only gives one piece of advice to the contestants: Lisez bien la recette ! 'Read the recipe well!'. The judging is blind, but just as strict as the first round. The judges rank the bakes from worst to first.

=== Creative Test / L'épreuve créative ===
The final phase involves creating and successfully baking a recipe that fits the challenge's theme (for instance, a dessert that is a trompe l'œil of a regional savory dish). The presentation often includes decoration around the bake, which itself is usually grand in scale and sometimes monumental in size. The contestants’ skill, creativity, and aesthetic sensibilities are all put to the test.

A VIP guest (e.g. a Meilleur Ouvrier de France or a top-tier professional pastry chef) joins the judges for this challenge, giving advice to the star-struck contestants and contributing to the commentary during the judging. Starting in season 11, the VIP judge also designates their favorite (le coup de cœur). This award contributes significantly to that contestant's standing in the competition that week.

During the baking, the judges and host interact with the contestants, along with the VIP guest. They offer advice and lay out expectations for the contestants' plans.

=== Deliberation and judgement / Délibération et jugement ===
Once the bakes are completed, the two judges meet alone in a room to compare performances. In doing so, they reveal who is in line for Pastry Chef of the Week/the Blue Apron, and who is at risk of elimination. After this the judges meet with the contestants. The VIP judge announces their coup de cœur, and the host announces who wins the Blue Apron, and who goes home.

Starting in Season 11, the eliminated contestant is kept behind and told that they have a chance to return to the tent, in a side competition, the Secret Kitchen (La cuisine secrète). In this competition, they immediately face off against another eliminated contestant, in a duel to survive. The winner will face the next eliminated contestant the next week. After Week 10, the survivor will be able to rejoin the main competition.

== First season (2012) ==
=== Contestants ===
Contestants	Age	Profession	Origin
Thomas Boursier	24	Laboratory technician	Lille
Sébastien Megner	31	Municipal employee	Lyon
Amandine Gayetin	29	Executive assistant	Lyon
Delphine Mounagne	35	Social worker	Monfort
Élodie Pouset	31	Unemployed	Ermont
Sylvie Coustarot	43	Brand manager	Valencin
Éric Esses	50	Sub-brigadier	Niort
Stéphane Chenique	34	Sales executive	Romorantin
Wilfried Eronise	23	Caregiver	Brugheas
Jacqueline Wilhelm	62	Retired	Namur

== Second edition (2013) ==
=== Contestants ===
Contestants	Age	Profession	Origin
Mounir Badaneu	30	Merchant	Neuchâtel, Switzerland
Gérald Vigne	40	Route driver	Saint-Nabord
Agathe Moreau	27	Laboratory technique	Bauvin
Aurélie Waner	28	Product manager	Paris
Sabrina Martin	31	Communication advisor	Mulhouse
Jean-Marie Evinseké	26	Chemical student	Argenteuil
Stella Degne	55	Fruit wholesaler	Toulon
Jessica Ganeret	31	Stay-at-home mom	Arlon, Belgium
Isabelle de Verês	30	Communication officer	Nantes
Benjamin Simon	34	Restaurant manager	Bagnolet

== Third season (2014) ==
=== Contestants ===
Contestants	Age	Profession	Origin
Anne-Sophie Wassel	29	Vlogger	London, UK
Abdelkarim Sadik	33	IT consultant	Argenteuil
Émilie Vigne	28	Former communications director	Metz
Julien Vesse	36	Flute professor	Nancy
Imane Sorte	33	On parental leave	Saint-Arnoult-en-Yvelines
Benjamin Galaté	27	Territorial technician	Villeneuve-d'Ascq
Pascal Epreveux	43	Former construction worker	Montpellier
Fabienne Trese	58	Unemployed	Gambais
Isabelle Etitimerkel	36	Stay-at-home mom	Bastogne, Belgium
Muriel Simon	58	Maternal assistant	Moisenay
Antoine Dritton	27	Mannequin	Combrée
