= Alexia Laroche-Joubert =

French television producer (born 1969)

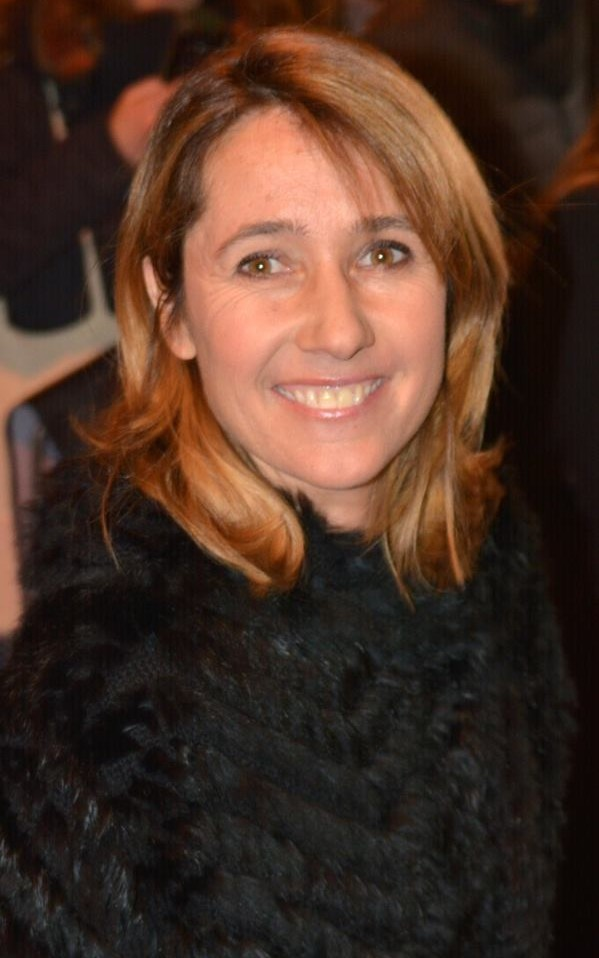
- Laroche-Joubert at the 2018 Globe de Cristal Awards
- Born: 18 December 1969 (age 56); Paris, France
- Education: Paris 1 Panthéon-Sorbonne University
- Occupations: Television producer; businesswoman
- Years active: 1988–present
- Television: Star Academy; Koh-Lanta; Fort Boyard; Miss France
- Spouses: Yan-Philippe Blanc (died 2003) Guillaume Multrier (m. 2007; div. 2010) Alexis Lesueur (m. 2014)
- Children: 2

Alexia Laroche-Joubert (born 18 December 1969) is a French television producer and businesswoman. She is the managing director of the French production company Adventure Line Productions and CEO of Banijay France. Laroche-Joubert is best known for producing the reality television series Star Academy (2001–2008), Koh-Lanta (2016–present), and Fort Boyard (2016–present), and for her role as president of the Miss France Company (2021–2023).

== Early life and education ==
Laroche-Joubert was born on 18 December 1969 in Paris to parents Patrick and Martine Laroche-Joubert (née Gabarra), and raised in the 16th arrondissement. Her father was a publicist, while her mother was a journalist and reporter. Her parents later separated and her mother remarried; Laroche-Joubert has four younger half-brothers. Laroche-Joubert studied law at Paris 1 Panthéon-Sorbonne University, and later received a diplôme d'études supérieures spécialisées (DESS) in intellectual property law; her initial career aspiration was to become a police commissioner.

== Career ==
Laroche-Joubert began her career in 1988, collaborating with her stepfather Michel Thoulouze on programs aired on the Jimmy television channel until 1996. From 1996 to 1998, Laroche-Joubert worked with Michel Denisot and Marc-Olivier Fogiel on the Canal+ programs Télés Dimanche and TV+. In 1998, she became the editor-in-chief of the news magazines and documentaries unit of TF1, later becoming editor-in-chief of the TF1 news magazine series Exclusif in 2000.

In 2007, she hosted Racontons-nous on Europe 1 radio and presented Ma drôle de vie on TMC. From 2010, she hosted the programme Chaps and the city on Equidia1.

In 2001, Laroche-Joubert produced the reality television series Loft Story on M6. In the same year, she also began producing the series Star Academy on TF1, remaining as an executive producer on the series until 2008, and serving as the series's academy director in seasons one, two, five, six, and seven. From 2004 to 2008, Laroche-Joubert served as director of programs at Endemol France. Laroche-Joubert left Endemol France in 2008, in order to create her own production company ALJ Productions, through which she began developing and producing a variety of television programs for broadcasters such as M6 and France 4.

In 2016, Laroche-Joubert became the new managing director of French production company Adventure Line Productions. Later that year, she began producing the reality television series Koh-Lanta on TF1 and Fort Boyard on France 2. In 2017, she became a producer on the children's television series Les Minikeums on France 3. In October 2021, she was hired by Endemol France to serve as the new president of the Miss France Company. She oversaw the production of Miss France 2022 in collaboration with Sylvie Tellier, before beginning a collaboration with Cindy Fabre ahead of Miss France 2023. In July 2023, she was appointed the CEO of Banijay France. In November 2023, Laroche-Joubert announced she would resign from her leadership role with Miss France following the conclusion of Miss France 2024, due to her responsibilities as CEO of Banijay France.

== Personal life ==
Laroche-Joubert gave birth to her first daughter in 2002, with husband Yan-Philippe Blanc, who was a music executive and the director-general of Warner Music France. Blanc later died in a motorcycle accident the following year. Laroche-Joubert married businessman and entrepreneur Guillaume Multrier in 2007, with whom she had her second daughter, before divorcing in 2010. Laroche-Joubert married her third husband, urologist Alexis Lesueur, in 2014.

== Filmography ==
- Loft Story (2001; 2002; M6)
- Star Academy (2001–2008; TF1)
- Nice People (2003; TF1)
- La Ferme Célébrités (2004; TF1)
- Le Pensionnat de Chavagnes (2004; M6)
- Première Compagnie (2005; TF1)
- Secret Story (2007–2017; TF1)
- Une surprise peut en cacher une autre ! (2008; France 2)
- Dilemme (2010; W9)
- Et toi, est-ce que tu buzz ? (2010; France 4)
- Les Ch'tis (2011–2014; W9)
- Les Marseillais (2012–present; W9)
- Véto Junior (2013; France 4)
- Une saison au zoo (2014–present; France 4)
- Y'a que les imbéciles qui ne changent pas d'avis ! (2014; M6)
- École 42, Born to code (2014)
- Le Maillon faible (2014–2015; C8)
- Mission plus-value (2015– 2016; NRJ 12)
- Koh-Lanta (2016–present; TF1)
- Fort Boyard (2016–present; France 2)
- Cut ! (2016–2017; France Ô)
- Les cerveaux (2017; TF1)
- 10 couples parfaits (2017; NT1)
- Le test qui sauve (2017; France 2)
- L'adresse idéale (2017; NT1)
- Undressed (2017; NRJ 12)
- Les Minikeums (2017–2021; France 4)
- École Aventure (2017–present; Télétoon+)
- La Carte aux trésors (2018–present; France 3)
- Fort Boyard : toujours plus fort ! (2018–present; France 2)
- Boyard Land (2019–2021; France 2)
- Cleaners (2020–present; TFX)
- Forces spéciales : l'expérience (2020–present; M6)
- La cuisine de Willy (2020–present; Okoo)
- Le Grand Quiz (2021–present; TF1)
- Le quiz de Cyril Gossbo (2021; Okoo)
- Miss France (2021–2023; TF1)
