= Verrine =

Glass container for serving food

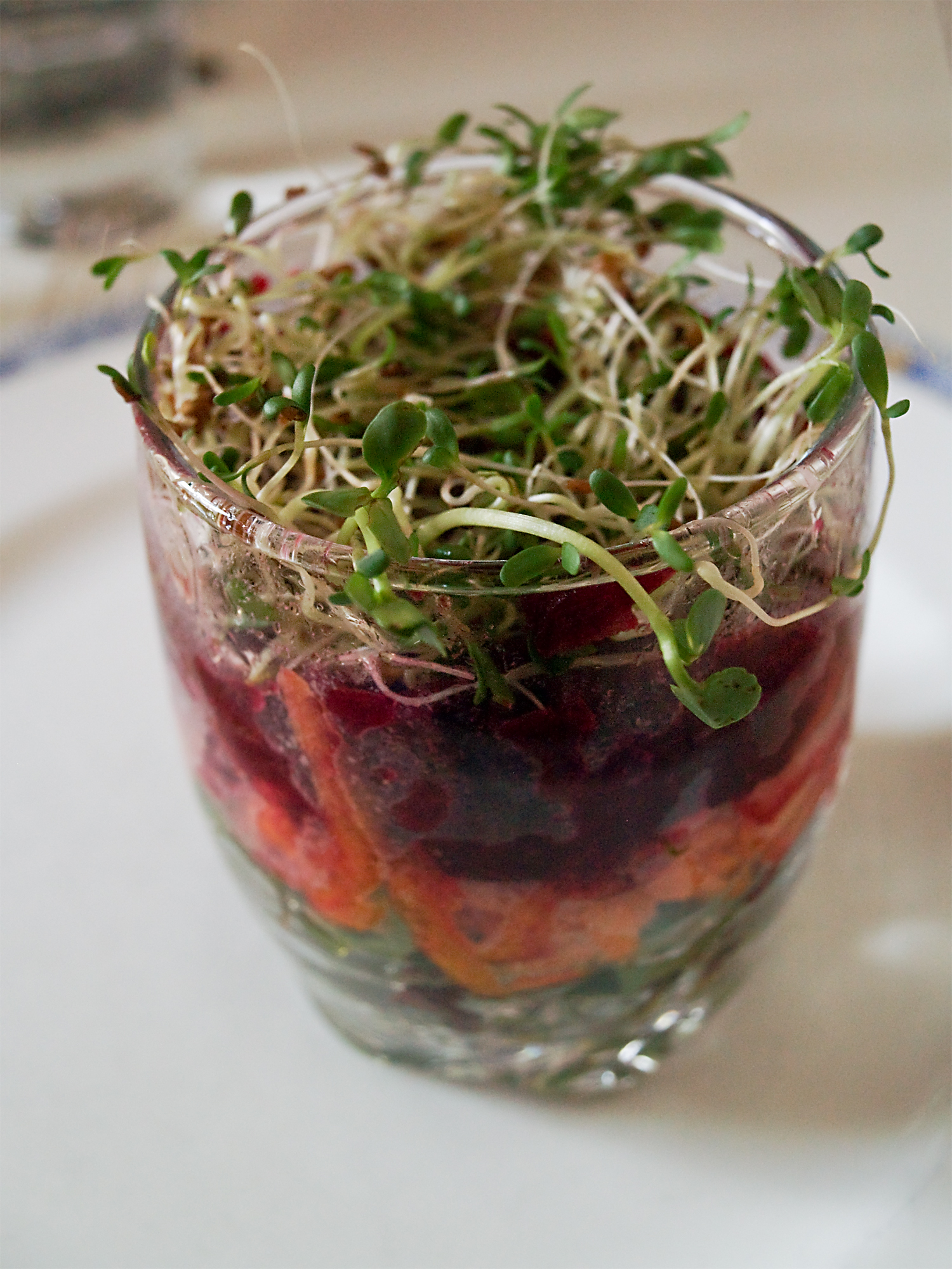
A verrine, here with sprouts.

A verrine (French: [vɛ.ʁin]) is a glass container, often small, in which is served a starter, main course or dessert, rather than a drink. The glass might be able to be used for drinks, but when used for food, it is referred to as a verrine, and indeed the dish itself can be named ″a verrine″. This French word is usually left untranslated because there is no single English word for it.

Metonymously, a "verrine" designates in the cooking world a dish served in a verrine, in a vertical manner, allowing a different aesthetic and gustatory experience compared to a dish served on a plate.

Philippe Conticini was the first (in 1994) to imagine a dessert served in a verrine. He introduced more than a simple evolution of the form, but rather a notable evolution in taste experience.

The verticality and transparency of the verrine allows:

- Immediate visual reading and construction of taste, and
- Completion of the gustatory balance in the mouth rather than in the verrine; sensations of intensity and finish are strengthened and better controlled by the experiencer.

According to the original concept, verrines are composed of three layers, each conveying specific taste characteristics:

- The upper, thin layer is made of an acidic preparation to trigger salivation and prepare the taste buds to receive other tastes
- The intermediate, thicker layer consists of a preparation bringing the "main flavor"
- The lower layer consists of a smooth and silky preparation aimed at coating the taste buds and providing a full-bodied, pleasant finish.
