= Frédéric Bau =

French pastry chef (born 1965)

- Born: 1 April 1965 (age 61); Lorraine, France
- Known for: Pastry chef, television presenter
- Website: fredericbau.fr

Frédéric Bau (born 1965) is a pastry chef and chocolate expert.

After receiving training from Pierre Hermé, Bau opened the culinary training institute École du Grand Chocolat in 1988 with the French chocolate maker Valrhona. Since then, Bau has disseminated his approach to chocolate as an author and television presenter. He has been associated with Valrhona through his career, and in 2012 the company released blond chocolate, a variety of chocolate Bau had created seven years earlier after accidentally leaving white chocolate in a bain-marie for four days. As of 2023, Bau was the creative director of Valrhona.

== Biography ==
Bau was born 1 April 1965 in the Woippy commune in Lorraine, France. As a teenager, he became an apprentice to pastry chef Pierre Koenig, and in 1982, at age 17, Bau won the Best Apprentice in France competition. Based on this win, he was taken under Pierre Hermé's tutelage. In 1988, Bau founded the chocolate school École du Grand Chocolat with the French chocolate company Valrhona. Through classes and textbooks created at École du Grand Chocolat, Bau's approach to chocolate was disseminated. One example is seen in Bau's "rule of three" for making ganache, which advises heated cream should be added in three stages to avoid breaking the emulsion. Over the following years this technique became common practice among chocolatiers.

As of 2004, Bau was still the director of the Valrhona École du Grand Chocolat. In other roles at this time he was a teacher and pastry chef. He hosted a weekly cooking program, Sucre Sucre, on French television and had a reputation as an innovator around chocolate. Bau also gave seminars in Europe and Japan and authored cookbooks aimed at professionals and laypeople. An enthusiastic profile that year in the Canadian newspaper The Gazette described Bau as "one of France's top pastry chefs" who was "considered the leading international chocolate expert", with a "God-like status in chocolate circles."

The following year, in his telling, Bau inadvertently invented blonde chocolate during a demonstration in Japan. According to Bau, he accidentally left white chocolate heating in a bain marie. Upon returning to it four days later, he discovered an aromatic and "blonde" chocolate. Seven years later, Valrhona brought this to market under the name Dulcey, and later lobbied the French government to designate it as a fourth type of chocolate, after the white, dark, and milk varieties.

Through this period he published several books including Fusion Chocolate and Cooking with Chocolate: Essential Recipes and Techniques. In the latter, Bau acted as editor, and the text was nominated for a 2012 James Beard Foundation Award for best book in the category baking and dessert. His books have been cited as a key influence on New York pastry chef Johnny Iuzzini, who described Bau in a 2008 influence as a "master [technician] and very inspiring".

In 2017, Bau sat on the jury of the reality TV cooking competition Le Meilleur Pâtissier. There, he gained a reputation as a harsh critic and as having made contestants cry; he said in a later interview this was not true. Two years later, he co-hosted the pastry competition Rois du Gâteau. As of 2023 Bau was creative director of Valrhona. Bau is close friends with fellow pastry chefs Christophe Felder and Gilles Marchal.

== See also ==
- French chocolate

== Sources ==
- Bruni, Frank (6 May 2008). "Q and A: Johnny Iuzzini". The New York Times.
- Chesterman, Lesley (14 February 2004). "Chocolate dinner for grownups". The Gazette.
- Duvert, Albin (7 August 2017). "Le Meilleur Pâtissier - Les professionnels : Qui est Frédéric Bau ?" [The Best Pastry Chef - The Professionals: Who is Frédéric Bau?]. Télé-Loisirs (in French). Archived from the original on 15 February 2018.
- Hallock, Betty (20 March 2012). "James Beard book award nominees announced; chefs shortlisted". Los Angeles Times.
- LaTempa, Susan; Perry, Charles (2 November 2005). "Shelves and shelves of delicious reads". Los Angeles Times.
- Lecoeuvre, Sarah (2 January 2019). "«Parfois, les gâteaux étaient dégueulasses» : dans les coulisses des Rois du Gâteau sur M6" [Sometimes the cakes were disgusting’: behind the scenes of Les Rois du Gâteau on M6]. Le Figaro (in French). Archived from the original on 2 January 2019.
- Lutaud, Léna (20 September 2013). "Pour les becs sucrés, le soleil se lève à l'est" [For those with a sweet tooth, the sun rises in the east]. Le Figaro (in French). Archived from the original on 21 September 2013.
- Noblet, Stéphanie (9 November 2019). "Cuisine : la ganache pour les truffes" [Cooking: ganache for truffles]. Le Monde (in French).
- Rousseau, Daphné (28 March 2024). "Blond vs pink: French-Swiss battle for 'fourth' chocolate". Agence France-Presse. Archived from the original on 3 April 2024.
- von Bardeleben, Elvire (26 January 2023). "Toujours plus beau, mais toujours plus sain : le dilemme des pâtissiers" [Is sweetening a mistake? How pastry chefs are reinventing their desserts]. Le Monde (in French).
