= Maxime Chattam =

French novelist

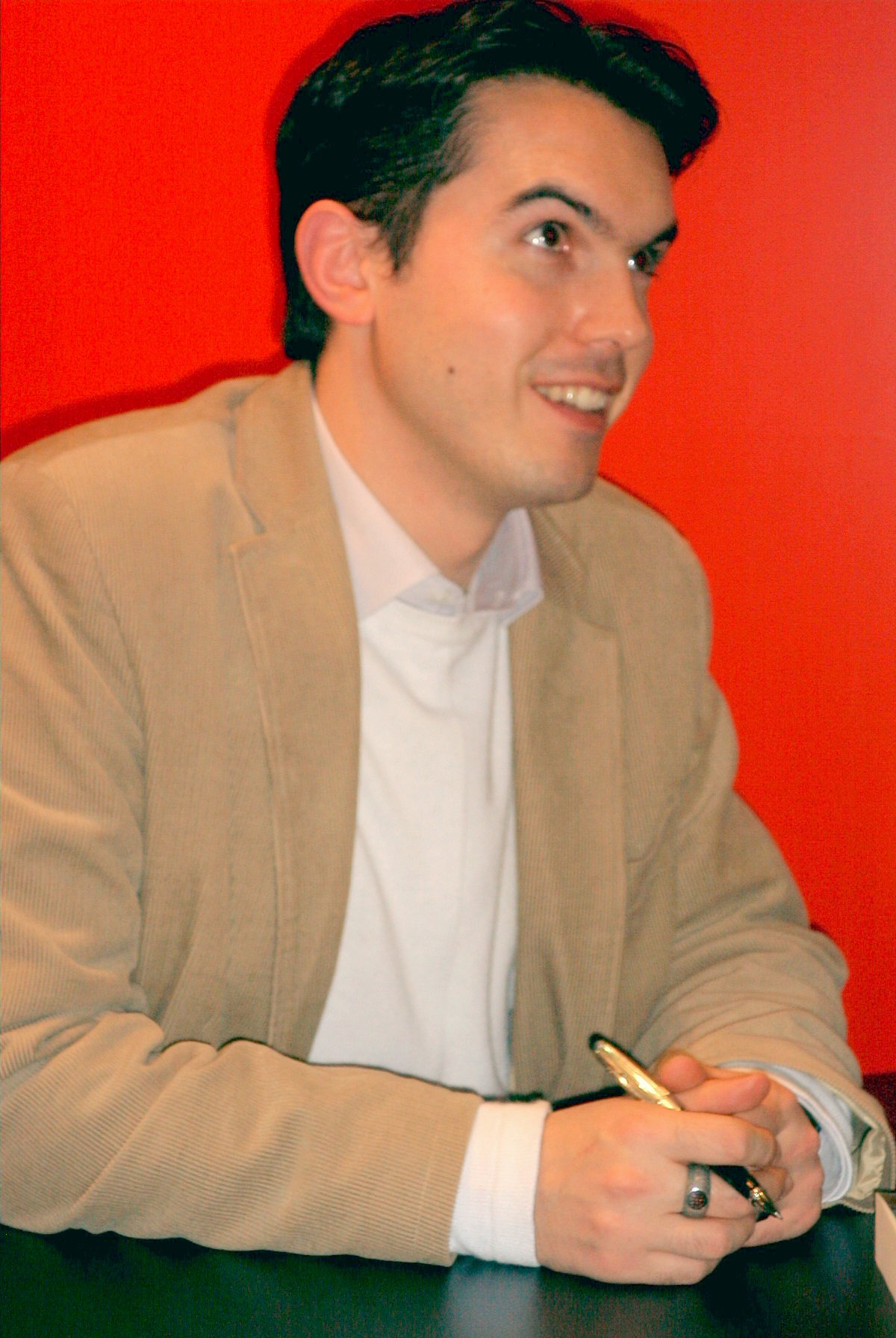
Maxime Chattam

Maxime Drouot, known by his pen name Maxime Chattam or Maxime Williams, is a French novelist who, after studying criminology, specialized in writing crime novels.

== Biography ==
His father worked for a magazine as an artistic director while his mother was an executive secretary Throughout his childhood Chattam would frequently visit the United States. His first visit was to Portland, Oregon which would later inspire his first novel. He completed his schooling at lycée Montesquieu à Herblay, continuing to Sorbonne Paris North University. During his childhood, he wanted to become an actor. He took comedy courses at Cours Simon in Paris.

In 1988, he spent some time in the Thai jungle. While there he wrote a diary, which would become his first experience with writing. He continued writing into the early 1990s. His first literary essays were inspired by the Stephen King film Stand by Me. He drafted his first novel, Le Coma des mortels, which tells the story of a young man fallen into a coma following an accident, which is later revealed as an attempted murder.

He resumed his studies, focused on modern literature. He wrote Le Cinquième Règne, published in 2003 under the pen name Maxime Williams. It would go on to win the fantastic novel prize at the festival de Gérardmer. He then spent a year studying criminology at the université de Saint-Denis. Over the course of this year, he would learn the basics of criminal psychology, police science and techniques, and medical jurisprudence.

L'Âme du mal (published in 2002, under the pen name « Chattam », inspired by a small town in Louisiana) recounts an investigation by Joshua Brolin, ex-FBI agent turned Portland Police officer, aided by a young psychology student. A killer seems to have revived his mutilated victims through a ritual only leaving clues from a black Bible.

The second installment in the trilogy following Joshua Brolin is In Tenebris (published in 2003) set in a dark and gritty New York. A woman found traumatized claims that she has come back from Hell. Officer Annabel O'Donnel leads the investigation, helped by a decommissioned Brolin.

In Maléfices (published in 2004), Brolin and O'Donnel face off against a serial killer who mummifies their victims in a spider web.

From 2008 onward, he published the Otherland saga (Autre-Monde in French), a series of post-apocalyptic fantasy novels that begins with an unexplained catastrophe known as the Storm, an exceptionally violent hurricane accompanied by strange luminous phenomena rising from the ground, which completely transforms the planet and its ecosystems. Following this event, human civilization collapses, technology ceases to function, and adults either disappear or are transformed into dangerous and hostile beings, while adolescents appear to be the only ones spared, without understanding why. In this radically altered world, they must—particularly in the first three volumes—survive, organize themselves, and seek the origin of the Storm, while confronting an environment that has become extremely hazardous, with both human and non-human threats. Otherworld/Autre-Monde is enjoying massive success in Europe.

He would later write a prequel to the trilogy, La Promesse des ténèbres. This novel follows Brady O'Donnel, husband of Annabel O'Donnel.

In 2019, his editor indicated he had sold 7 million copies of his work since 2001.

Chattam is a member of the art collective La Ligue de l'Imaginaire.

== Personal life ==
Maxime Chattam is married to Faustine Bollaert. They have one daughter and one son.

== Selected works ==
=== Trilogy of Evil ===
1. L'Âme du mal, Michel Lafon « Thriller », 2002 Grand prix Sang d'encre 2002
2. In Tenebris, Michel Lafon « Thriller », 2003
3. Maléfices, Michel Lafon « Thriller », 2004
4. Spin-off: La Promesse des ténèbres, Albin Michel, 2009

=== The Cycle of Man and Truth ===
1. Les Arcanes du chaos, Albin Michel « Spécial suspense », 2006
2. Prédateurs, Albin Michel « Spécial suspense », 2007
3. La Théorie Gaïa, Albin Michel « Spécial suspense », 2008

=== The Diptych of Time ===
1. Léviatemps, Albin Michel, 2010 ISBN 9782226215307.
2. Le Requiem des abysses, Albin Michel, 2011 (ISBN 978-2226221414).

=== Ludivine Vancker ===
1. La Conjuration primitive, Albin Michel, 2012 ISBN 222624140X
2. La Patience du diable, Albin Michel, 2014 ISBN 2226311122
3. L'Appel du néant, Albin Michel, 2017 ISBN 2226319476
4. La Constance du prédateur, Albin Michel, 2022 ISBN 978-2226319517

=== Autre Monde ===
Cycle 1: The Alliance of the Three

1. L'Alliance des Trois (2008)
2. Malronce (2009)
3. Le Coeur de la Terre (2010)

Cycle 2: The Breath of Shadow

1. Entropia (2011)
2. Oz (2012)
3. Neverland (2013)

Final Volume

1. Genèse (2016)

Spin-off / Side story:

1. Ambre (2016) – focuses on the backstory of the heroine Ambre.

=== Independent novels ===
- Le Cinquième Règne, sous le pseudonyme de Maxime Williams - Prix du Roman Fantastic'Arts du Festival de Gérardmer 2003, Masque GF, 2003
- Le Sang du temps, Michel Lafon, coll. « Thriller », 2005
- Que ta volonté soit faite, Albin Michel, 2015 ISBN 978-2-226-31244-0
- Le Coma des mortels, Albin Michel, 2016 ISBN 978-2-226-32078-0
- Le Signal, Albin Michel, 2018 ISBN 978-2226319487
- Un(e)secte, Albin Michel, 2019 ISBN 978-2226319494
- L'Illusion, Albin Michel, 2020 ISBN 978-2226319500
- Le Mal, 1995 (Disponible sur le site officiel)

=== Graphic novels ===
- La Trilogie du mal. Volume 1, Le Bourreau de Portland / scénario Maxime Chattam; dessin Michel Montheillet. Coéd. Jungle - Michel Lafon, 2012, 44 p. ISBN 978-2-87442-963-7
- La Trilogie du mal. Volume 2, Écrit sur les portes de l'enfer / scénario Maxime Chattam; dessin Michel Montheillet. Coéd. Jungle - Michel Lafon, 2013, 54 p. ISBN 978-2-8222-0003-5
- La Trilogie du mal. Volume 3, L'Âme du mal / scénario Maxime Chattam; dessin Michel Montheillet; couleurs Brett Smit. Coéd. Jungle - Michel Lafon, 2016, 56 p. ISBN 978-2-8222-1297-7

=== Prefaces ===
- Et dans ce temps, une vie bascule / Mairie de Bessancourt, 2005. Recueil du concours de nouvelles policières de Bessancourt
- L'Ultime voyage de la Fleur de lys / Charles-Antoine Cros. Dammarie-les-Lys : Éd. du Lys noir, février 2010, 118-XXXII p. ISBN 978-2-917039-04-5
- Par-delà les montagnes hallucinées, 6^{e} édition française du jeu de rôle "L'appel de Cthulhu", 2010, éditions Sans-Détour
- "Crimes - Manuel de l'enquêteur" / Yann Lefebvre, SYCKO, 2017, ISBN 979-10-94206-01-0
- Frankenstein / reproduction du manuscrit d'origine de Mary Shelley, Editions Saints-Pères, 2018

Screenplays and directing

2012: Terreur, short film directed with Sébastien Drouin

2014: La Collection: Writing for… One’s Thirties as Seen by Writers — short film, Par acquis de conscience

=== Adaptations ===
- L'âme du mal : téléfilm de 2011, inspiré de son roman
- Le signal : série en préparation annoncée début avril 2022 par l'auteur sur Twitter
