= Philippe Conticini =

French chef (born 1963)

Philippe Conticini (born 16 August 1963) is a French chef and pastry chef. Philippe Conticini has been described by the French press as "a pastry genius" and "one of the greatest pastry chefs of his time".

Having worked in France, in the U.S. and in Japan, he conceived four innovations including verrines in 1994, which present dishes traditionally served on plates in a vertical, transparent container.

After receiving several awards and working in Michelin-starred restaurants (including La Table d'Anvers and Petrossian), he cofounded and became head pastry chef of the Pâtisserie des Rêves, a patisserie with outlets in France, Japan and the UK.

== Biography ==
=== Youth and apprenticeship ===
Conticini was born on 16 August 1963 in Choisy-le-Roi (Val-de-Marne). He spent his childhood in his parents' kitchens at the Restaurant du Rocher in Vitry (Val-de-Marne), then at the Michelin-starred Restaurant du Parc in Villemomble (Seine-Saint-Denis). His apprenticeship began in 1980 at Alain Dutournier's double Michelin starred Trou Gascon, just before taking on pastry-making at Maxim's Roissy outlet.

After earning his Certificat d'Aptitude Professionnelle (CAP) in Pâtisserie (the French equivalent of a British NVQ) in pastry, frozen dessert-making and chocolate-making) he began his career in 1983 as a pastry assistant at Jacques Chibois' double Michelin-starred Gray d'Albion; after two years, he left for Peltier in 1985.

=== Rise ===
In May 1986, Conticini, as a co-owner, opened the restaurant La Table d'Anvers (which was awarded one Michelin star), a restaurant where he was head pastry chef until 1998. During that time, he incorporated techniques originally used only in savoury cooking, such as sauce reduction, minute cooking, deglazing and seasoning.

Elected pastry chef of the year 1991 by the Gault Millau magazine, he distinguished himself in 1994 by inventing verrine desserts, which he described as affording him control over the sensations that diners feel, and transmitting his understanding of taste to others.

His growing reputation led Conticini to serve as a cooking consultant for several food companies (Materne in 1995, Senoble from 2001 to 2005, Ferrero in 2005, Nestlé in 2006), and to appear in various media and shows to popularize 'contemporary' pastry. In 1996, he organized the Des arômes et des hommes (international day of contemporary pastry), cofounded the 'Art et Dessert' association (for popularizing contemporary pastry) and collaborated for two years with Thuriès Gastronomie Magazine, where he wrote a monthly column. He was named president of the jury of the French Dessert making championships in 1997 and 1998.

=== International recognition ===
In 1999, Conticini began a collaboration with the House of Petrossian in Paris and New York, as a cooking consultant, through which he gained recognition outside of France. He became head pastry chef at Petrossian in Paris, a restaurant which was rated 17/20 by Gault Millau two years later. In 2000, he created a café-boutique concept for the 7th Avenue outlet of Petrossian, noted by the 'Dining Out' section of The New-York Times, with the newspaper inviting him to contribute eight successive columns.

Conticini returned to work with the Peltier pâtisseries in Paris and starting from 2002 in Tokyo. In January 2003, he coached the French team to win the world pastry champion title in Lyon. He then turned to personal projects such as launching a high-end catering company, Exception Gourmande (until 2008), then in 2009, the Pâtisserie des Rêves par Philippe Conticini, with a first Parisian outlet on Rue du Bac, a second one on Rue de Longchamp in 2010, and two Japanese outlets opening in Kyoto and Osaka, Japan, in 2012.

He has been named president of the national final of the amateur macaroon competition, and of the 40th edition of the French dessert championship.

== Innovations ==
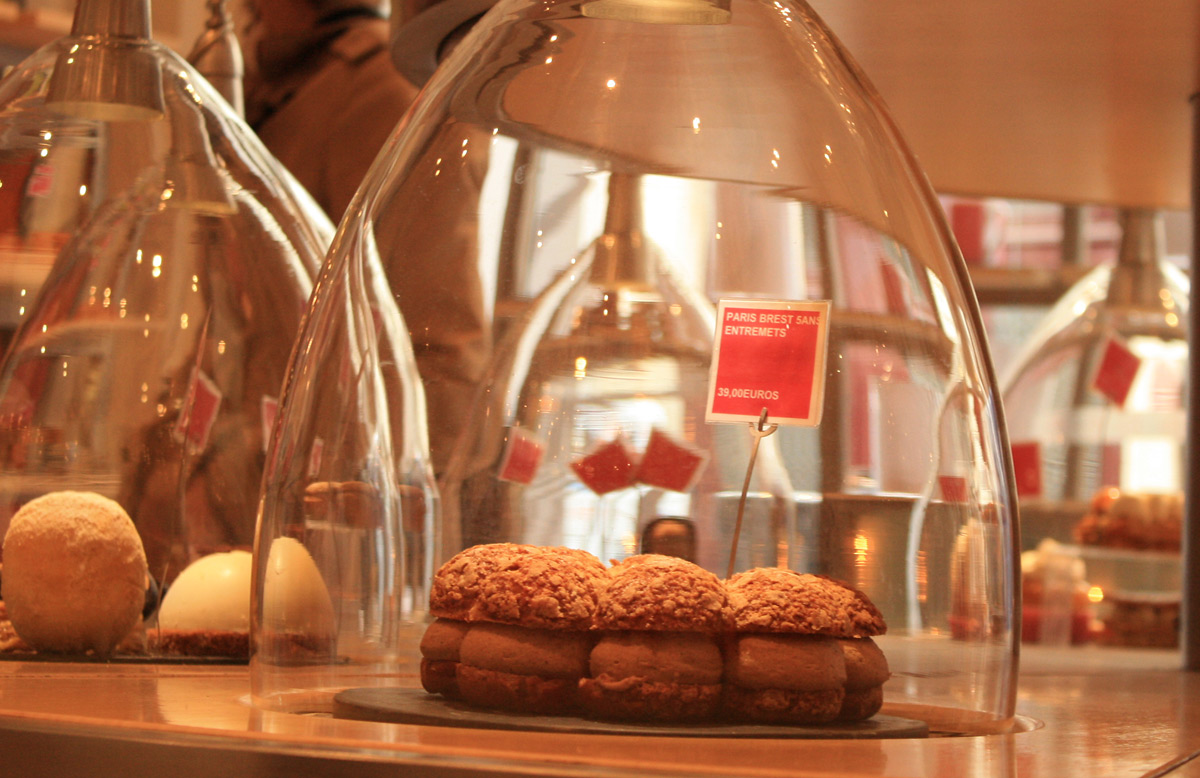
'Paris Brest' pastry variation by Philippe Conticini. 'Pâtisserie des Rêves', Paris.

- Verrines (1994): he transformed the world of gastronomy and pastry by being the first to serve dishes and desserts 'vertically' in glasses rather than horizontally in plates (traditional serving).
- Gourmet cooking with mass consumption products (2004): aiming to show that gastronomy is not reserved for elites, he became among the first chefs to work with mass consumption food products. As early as 1994, at La Table d'Anvers, he began using Coca-Cola, in the jelly of his Cocajou dessert. In Tentations (2004), he published a recipe using Nutella. Ferrero contacts him soon after and he published Sensations Nutella the following year, a book of recipes using the chocolate spread. He then published Concentré de délices (Concentrate of delights), a book of recipes using everyday food products. The book's cover purposely imitated Andy Warhol's Campbell's Soup Cans II artwork; in 2007, he also published Le Thon c'est bon (Tuna is good), a book of recipes using canned tuna as the main ingredient.
- Reinvented classics (2009): Conticini was among the firsts to reinvent classic French pastries, adapting them to today's tastes for less sugar, and lighter, more intense taste. "Just like Ferran Adrià did it with traditional paella, he managed to revisit the great classics of our pastries entirely, bringing the infinite lightness, softness, and simplicity of his own", wrote Joël Robuchon, in his preface of Sensations (2009), notably through his tarte Tatin, his Paris-Brest or his Saint-Honoré.
- The choux bar (2010): Conticini introduced the concept of 'choux-bun bar'. The à la minute assembly allowed a structure of textures (between the cream and the puff pastry) and tastes (between the cracker, the main cream and the insert) capable of retrieving all the taste characteristics of the product far away from the kitchen where it was prepared. Since then, choux-buns have grown in popularity and in favor like macaroons and cupcakes.

== Awards ==
- Elected 1991 Pastry chef of the year by Gault Millau
- Rated 17/20 by Gault Millau, and 1 Michelin star for his work at La Table d'Anvers restaurant in 1986 (Paris)
- Distinguished as one of the most promising figures in cooking by Gault Millau in 2001
- Rated 17/20 by Gault Millau, and 1 Michelin star for his work at Petrossian restaurant in 2002 (Paris)
- Coached the French world pastry champion team in 2003
- Honorary member of the French national cooking academy in May 2003
- Knight of the Ordre National du Mérite in June 2004
- Named Best Paris-Brest in Paris by Le Figaro in 2010
- President of the jury of the Charles Proust competition in 2012
- Knight of the Ordre des Arts et des Lettres in February 2015

== Media ==
Along with his activities as a chef, Philippe Conticini has been eager to pass on his experience of taste. Besides his articles in the specialized press he has participated in editing a number of books, and conceiving several TV shows, such as Jeux de Goûts on Cuisine TV starting from 2006.

=== Bibliography ===
- Christian Conticini, Philippe Conticini, La Cuisine Gourmande des Stars, Paris, Éditions Bilan 2000, 1989
- Philippe Conticini, J'ai perdu 120 kilos, Paris, Éditions J'ai Lu, 1996
- Philippe Conticini, Jacques Fricker, Desserts en liberté: Le plaisir en gardant la forme, Paris, Éditions Odile Jacob, 1999
- Michalene Busico, ed., The Chefs of The Times, New York, St. Martin's Press, 2001 (ISBN 978-0-312-28447-3) (Includes Conticini's "The Chef" columns co-written with Amanda Hesser.)
- Philippe Boé, Blandine Boyer, Philippe Conticini, Tentations, Paris, Éditions Marabout, 2004 (ISBN 978-2-5010-4302-1) (Awarded best chef's book in the world in Stockholm, book of the year in France)
- Philippe Boé, Philippe Conticini, Sensations Nutella, Paris, Éditions Marabout, 2005 (ISBN 978-2-9146-4570-6)
- Philippe Boé, Philippe Conticini, Sandra Mahut, Concentré de délices, Paris, Éditions Marabout, 2006 (ISBN 978-2-5010-4497-4)
- Philippe Conticini, Croquez Monsieur!, Paris, Éditions Marabout, 2007 (ISBN 978-2-5010-5127-9)
- Philippe Conticini, Le Thon, c'est bon !, Paris, Éditions Marabout, 2007 (ISBN 978-2-5010-5586-4)
- Philippe Boé, Philippe Conticini, Verrines du Chef, Paris, Éditions Marabout, 2008 (ISBN 978-2-5010-5987-9)
- Philippe Boé, Philippe Conticini, Sensations: 288 recettes de pâtisserie, Paris, Éditions Minerva, 2009 (ISBN 978-2-8307-1200-1)
- Philippe Conticini, Original Speculoos, Paris, Éditions Agnès Vienot, 2009 (ISBN 978-2-3532-6062-1)
- Philippe Conticini et alii (collectif), Les Desserts: 1000 recettes, 1000 photos, Paris, Editions Solar, 2012 (ISBN 978-2-2630-3172-4)
- Philippe Conticini, La Pâtisserie des Rêves, Paris, Éditions Gründ, 2012 (ISBN 978-2-3240-0326-4)
- Best of Philippe Conticini, Paris, Éditions Alain Ducasse, 2012 (ISBN 978-2-8412-3442-4)
- Pies, 40 tourtes sensationnelles, Paris, Éditions La Martinière, 2013 (ISBN 978-2-7324-5663-8)

=== Articles ===
- Thuriès Gastronomie Magazine: published a monthly column called Tanganyika from 1996 to 1998
- New York Times: publishes eight weekly columns in 2001
- Zeste: publishes a five-page column in each issue starting from September 2012

=== Television ===
From 2006 onward, he has designed and hosted Jeux de Goûts, a TV show produced and broadcast by TV channels Odyssée and Cuisine TV. The programme aimed to explain how Conticini finds the right seasoning using cheap and easy to find ingredients, thereby enabling an inexperienced cook to conceive a quality seasoning by working on taste.

In 2012, he also intervened in Le Meilleur Pâtissier, the TV show broadcast by M6.
