= Sidonie Bonnec =

French radio and television presenter

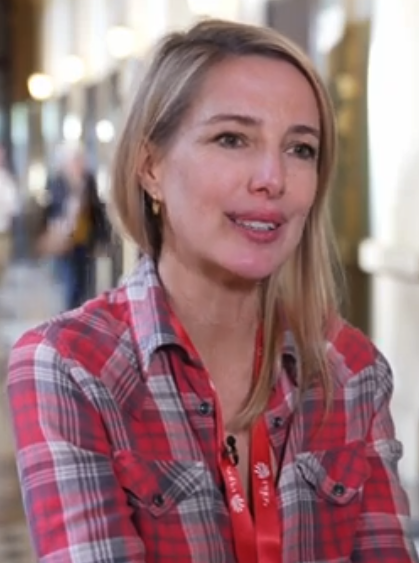
- In a 2025 interview
- Born: 25 February 1977 (age 49); Reims, Marne, France
- Occupations: Journalist, radio presenter, television presenter
- Years active: 2005–present
- Television: W9 (2008–15); France 5 (2015); France 2 (2017–present)

Sidonie Bonnec (born 25 February 1977) is a French radio and television presenter. After having collaborated in several programs as a columnist, she presented the program Enquêtes criminelles : le magazine des faits divers from 2008 to 2015 on W9. She then joined the public service and presented the program Les Maternelles on France 5 during one season, and then the game show Tout le monde a son mot à dire on France 2 since March 2017.

In the same time, she pursues her activity as a journalist presenting documentaries for television in which she is in immersion. Since 2011, she is a presenter on the radio station RTL, especially co-hosting the program La curiosité est un vilain défaut.

== Education and career beginnings ==
Sidonie Bonnec was born in Reims in the department of Marne. After obtaining her baccalauréat at high school in Saint-Malo in 1995, she pursued with literature studies. She graduated with a hypokhâgne at the Chateaubriand high school in Rennes, and then with a master's degree in literature at the University of Rennes 2. She began as a stringer for the daily newspaper Ouest-France.

In 1997, at age 20, she won the contest organized by Ouest-France that allowed her to become a member of the jury at the British film festival of Dinard, under the presidency of Kristin Scott Thomas. The next year, she joined the organization team and became a redactor of La Feuille du Festival from 1999 to 2001.

After graduating in journalism at the CELSA Paris in 2003, she presented her candidature for the contest of the "Endemol Créatif Master". She was part of the five selected out of 1,500 candidates. She then worked for Endemol where she learned how to conceive television programs.

== Television career ==
Sidonie Bonnec began her career on television in 2005 at the beginning of the digital terrestrial television, presenting the program Choc, l'émission on NT1. She then presented on Canal+ a sports chronicle on the program Jour de sport, also appearing on France 4 where she participated at the program Les Agités du bocal until its end.

In September 2007, she presented the musical program Musicronik on W9, where she gave information, commented new albums, concerts and web tendencies, and also interviewed celebrities. From 2005 to 2009, Sidonie Bonnec presented live every Wednesday evening during 5 seasons Nouvelle star, ça continue with Jérôme Anthony and Alexandre Devoise, where she interviews the contestants, musicians, technicians, and members of the jury. In March 2010, Sidonie Bonnec presented Destins extraordinaires on W9, a weekly program of 70 minutes of several reportages portraying people with an uncommon path like anonymous heroes and personalities. On 29 April 2011, she presented on the same channel a special program dedicated to the wedding of Prince William and Catherine Middleton. She conceived and presented a documentary in three parts on W9 in March and April 2012 titled La vie, la nuit. In these series of reportages, she is in immersion with people who work at night like firemen, policemen and emergency doctors.

Since September 2008, she presented on W9 the program Enquêtes criminelles : le magazine des faits divers during eight consecutive years until June 2015 and then being replaced. On 15 December 2014, she presented on the same channel a special program for the tenth anniversary of the 2004 Indian Ocean earthquake and tsunami titled Tsunami, 10 ans déjà, and realizing an excellent audience with 1.1 million viewers. On 4 March 2015, she presented a special program dedicated to the Malaysia Airlines Flight 370, about one year after the disappearance. The program was viewed by 1 million viewers.

In September 2015, she joined the program Les Maternelles on France 5, replacing Julia Vignali for one season.

In March 2017, she arrived on France 2 to co-host daily with Olivier Minne the game show Tout le monde a son mot à dire.

== Radio career ==
In Summer 2011 and 2012, she presented the radio program RTL Autour du Monde du lundi from Monday to Friday in the early afternoon with Jean-Sébastien Petitdemange. She also presented the year-end celebrations on RTL a special program titled En route pour… in 2012–13 and 2013–14. In September 2014, she started presenting the radio program La Curiosité est un vilain défaut in the evening from Monday to Thursday on RTL, a program she co-hosts with Thomas Hughes.

== Personal life ==
Sidonie Bonnec is the daughter of former professional soccer player Yannick Bonnec. She has a brother named Corentin.

She is the partner of the producer and director Jérôme Korkikian since 2009. She gave birth to a girl on 14 August 2014.
