= Mercotte =

French food critic

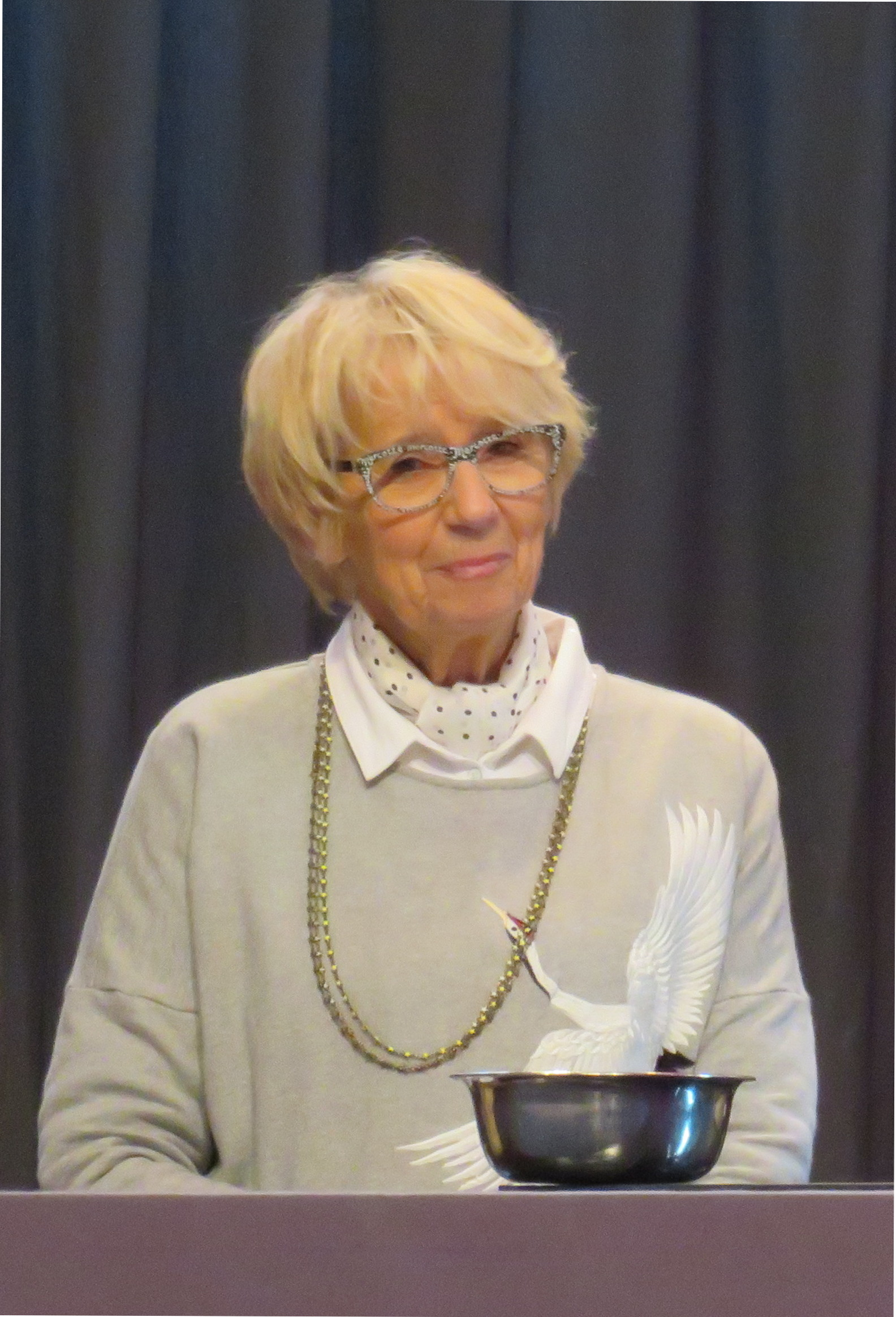
- Born: Jacqueline Pin; 28 September 1942 (age 83); Aix-les-Bains, France
- Other names: Jacqueline Mercorelli
- Education: University of Savoie
- Occupation: Judge Le Meilleur Pâtissier
- Employer: M6
- Children: 4

Jacqueline Mercorelli (née Pin), commonly known by her stage name Mercotte, is a French food critic, blogger, TV presenter and gastronome. She was born in 1942 in Aix-les-Bains. She has become famous through her participation as a judge in the television baking competition Le Meilleur pâtissier, a French adaptation of The Great British Bake Off, broadcast on M6.

== Biography ==
Jacqueline Mercorelli comes from Saint-Alban-Leysse, in the suburb of Chambéry.

After earning her baccalauréat in political science in Grenoble and her BA degree in English, she got married and had four children. It was only when her children left the nest that she really began to cook in a professional way.

In 1987, she wrote her first cookbook, with Monique Lansard, La nouvelle cuisine à votre portée 140 recettes légères, published by S.A.E.P, Colmar.

In 2005, she created her cooking web site La cuisine de Mercotte to share her passion for recipes. Most of the time Mercotte tries to simplify dessert recipes of chefs, in order to make them accessible to everyone.

In September 2007 she published her second book 30 desserts créatifs pour toutes les occasions. The same year she won the first prize in the cooking category at the "Festival d’expression sur internet" that took place in Romans-sur-Isère.

After many years devoted to learning every aspect of baking, she published in 2008 Solution Macaron, a book making make the process of baking macarons accessible for everyone.

In addition to the cookbook, her website and iOS app also provide macaron recipes. Fans can also ask questions on her blog.

Since 2012, with Cyril Lignac, she has been one of the judges of the baking competition Le meilleur patissier.
