= Arno Santamaria =

French singer-songwriter (born 1978)

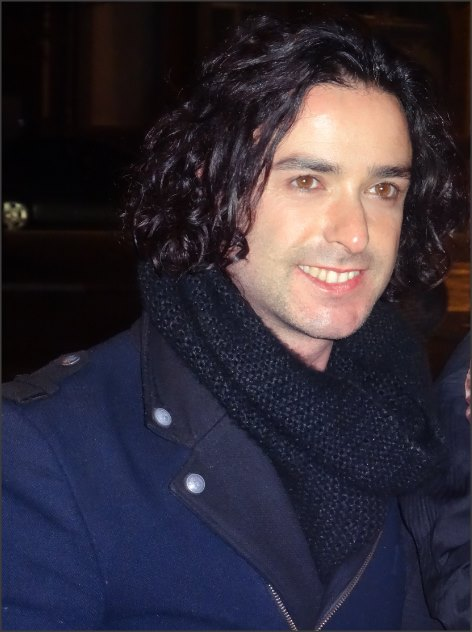
- Arno Santamaria

Background information
- Born: 9 November 1978 (age 47); Argenteuil, France
- Origin: France
- Genres: Chanson, French pop
- Labels: My Major Company, Capitol Records
- Website: http://arnosantamaria.com/

Arno Santamaria (born 1978 in Argenteuil, France) is a French singer-songwriter.

== Biography ==
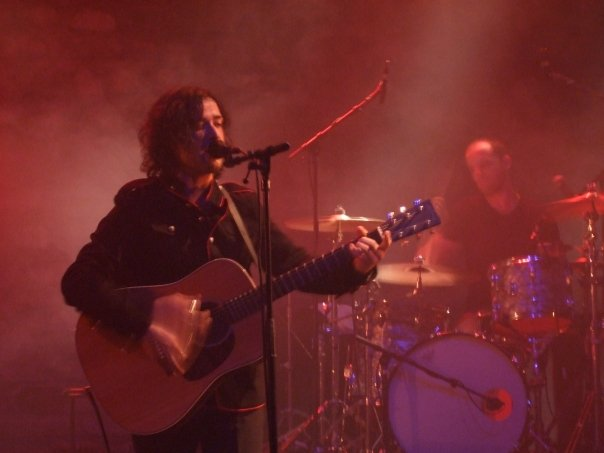
Arno Santamaria – Café de la Danse

Arno Santamaria taught himself to play the guitar alone. At 15 he formed a hard-rock band and played several rock and hard-rock scenes. At 17 he discovered Léo Ferré and began writing songs. He obtained a degree from Schola Cantorum de Paris as an audio engineer.

In 2009, he made his first album via Spidart, a crowdfunding platform.

In 2012, his second album 1362 was made with the help of 1362 producers on MyMajorCompany. He was the opening act for concerts by Murray Head, Gérald de Palmas and Arno.

== Rising Star ==
In 2014, Arno was candidate at the French version of Rising Star. He seduced the audience, and the singer Cali who was in the jury, by singing his own compositions. He finished in second place. After that Arno signed a contract with Capitol Records. In December, an EP with 4 tracks has been released and a third album was released in June 2015.

== Discography ==
=== Albums ===
Year	Album	Peak positions	Certification
Year	Album	FR	Certification
2009	Arno Santamaria	–	
2012	1362	–	
2015	Des corps libres	42	

=== EP ===
- 2014: Debout (je me sens bien)

=== Singles ===
Year	Single	Peak positions
Year	Single	FR
2014	"Debout (je me sens bien)"	155

== Award ==
- 2012 : Discovery by Public Francophone Radios
