= Rising Star (French TV series) =

French reality television series

Rising Star is a French singing reality television series, and the French edition of the international reality television franchise Rising Star. It is based on the Israeli singing reality competition series HaKokhav HaBa. The show's viewers become the instant ultimate juries with expert panelists given only a nominal percentage weight in voting. The French rights were bought by specialized music-oriented station M6.

== Season 1 (2014) ==
Season 1 was launched in 2014 with first season being between 25 September and 13 November 2014. The live broadcasts were held on "Plateau No. 5" of the Cité du Cinéma established by the film director and producer Luc Besson and located in Saint-Denis, a northern suburb of Paris.

=== Hosts ===
The hosts for the series were Faustine Bollaert and Guillaume Pley. The series was won by Corentin Grevost.

=== Panelists ===
The four-member panelists were:

- Cali - singer songwriter
- Cathy Guetta - the event organizer (ex-wife of David Guetta)
- David Hallyday - singer
- Morgan Serrano - director of French NRJ radio station

=== Reception ===
Rising Star French edition realised relatively high viewership at launch with 3.76 million viewers, representing 16.9% of total French audience. But despite the novelty and immediate interactivity created for public voting, the show lost momentum with following episodes as audiences fell below the 2-million benchmark and with 6 November 2014 only 1.52 million viewers capturing just 6.7% of the market.

M6 announced that the French adaptation of Rising Star had failed to attain the figures M6 had anticipated, although its format was welcomed as "audacious" and "innovative". M6 followed that by its decision to cut short the planned series by two episodes, and airing the finals much earlier than anticipated, i.e. by 13 November 2014.

=== The auditions ===
The candidates (or groups) perform live with the series' band behind a big semi-circular screen name "The digital wall" such that they are invisible to the viewing public and the panelists. In real time and throughout the performance, the public votes by a "yes" or "no" through the special app launched with the goal of reaching the 70% set barrier where "the wall" is raised with the candidate moving to the next round called "duel". If he/she fails to reach the 70%, the candidate is eliminated. In this stage 28 candidates were selected to pass to the next round

==== Auditions 1 ====
The first show was broadcast on 25 September 2014 starting 20:55. 6 candidates qualified in day 1

Index

- ✔ : The panelist voted "yes" for the candidate.
- ✘ : The panelist voted "no" for the candidate.

Candidat	Age	Song	Judges' choices				Total percentage	Result
Candidat	Age	Song	David	Cathy	Morgan	Cali	Total percentage	Result
Barbara Lune	24	Chandelier - Sia	✔	✘	✔	✘	43%	Eliminated
Séverine Romanet	39	Wrecking Ball - Miley Cyrus	✔	✔	✔	✔	89%	Qualified
Jackie Deschamps	60	Did not qualify for the wall						Eliminated
Léo Rispal	13	Comme toi - Jean-Jacques Goldman	✔	✔	✔	✔	90%	Qualified
Tarik	22	Hometown Glory - Adele	✔	✔	✘	✔	73%	Qualified
Émanuelle Robitaille	28	I Put a Spell on You - Screamin' Jay Hawkins	✔	✔	✔	✔	89%	Qualified
Louis Deslys	25	Si seulement je pouvais lui manquer - Calogero	✔	✔	✔	✘	54%	Eliminated
Maëva Bellocq	18	Did not qualify for the wall						Eliminated
Larry Lynch	25	Let Her Go - Passenger	✔	✔	✔	✔	94%	Qualified
The Rainbows		Get Lucky - Daft Punk	✘	✘	✘	✔	22%	Eliminated
Solène Le Vezo	18	Il me dit que je suis belle - Patricia Kaas	✔	✔	✔	✔	79%	Qualified

==== Auditions 2 ====
The second episode was broadcast 2 October 2014 at 20:55. Seven candidates qualified for next round.

Candidate	Age	Song	Judges's choices				Total Percentage	Result
Candidate	Age	Song	David	Cathy	Morgan	Cali	Total Percentage	Result
Ann-Shirley	19	Stay with Me - Sam Smith	✔	✔	✔	✔	75%	Qualified
Julien Loko	30	Demons - Imagine Dragons	✔	✘	✘	✔	63%	Eliminated
Hoshi	18	Mistral gagnant - Renaud	✔	✔	✔	✔	67%	Eliminated
Frénésie		Did not qualify for the wall						Eliminated
Tiwayo	28	Another Love - Tom Odell	✔	✔	✔	✔	84%	Qualified
Anne-Sophie Terschan	18	Respect - Aretha Franklin	✔	✔	✘	✔	77%	Qualified
Alexandra Miller	24	Halo - Beyoncé	✔	✔	✔	✘	79%	Qualified
Baby's	14	Pour une folie - Baby's	✔	✔	✔	✔	76%	Qualified
Julien Mueller	25	All of Me - John Legend	✔	✘	✘	✘	68%	Eliminated
MTatiana	25	Jalouse - Mademoiselle K	✔	✔	✔	✔	82%	Qualified
Sarah Sofia	21	Dernière danse - Indila	✘	✘	✘	✘	22%	Eliminated
Ahmed Mouici & The Golden Moments	51	I've Been Loving You Too Long - Otis Redding	✔	✔	✘	✔	74%	Qualified

==== Auditions 3 ====
The third day of auditions was broadcast on October 9, 2014, at 20:55. Seven candidates qualified for the next round.

Candidate	Age	Song	Judges's choices				Total Percentage	Result
Candidate	Age	Song	David	Cathy	Morgan	Cali	Total Percentage	Result
Mathieu Canaby	16	Isn't She Lovely? - Stevie Wonder	✔	✔	✔	✔	82%	Qualified
Jordan Chevallier	24	La Foule - Édith Piaf	✔	✘	✔	✔	76%	Qualified
Audrey Passani	20	Stay - Rihanna	✔	✔	✔	✔	87%	Qualified
Ludovic	28	Did not qualify for the wall						Eliminated
Monsieur Jau	35	Life on Mars? - David Bowie	✘	✔	✘	✔	57%	Eliminated
Corentin Grevost	18	Papaoutai - Stromae	✔	✔	✔	✔	91%	Qualified
Kenny Andra	25	Did not qualify for the wall						Eliminated
Huu	26	Budapest – George Ezra	✔	✔	✔	✔	91%	Qualified
Melody	26	Donne-moi le temps - Jenifer	✘	✘	✘	✘	32%	Eliminated
Sheila Ray Charles	52	Georgia on My Mind - Ray Charles	✔	✔	✔	✔	87%	Qualified
Arno Santamaria	35	Ma mère - Arno Santamaria	✔	✔	✔	✔	87%	Qualified
Whities		Grace Kelly - Mika	✘	✔	✔	✘	39%	Eliminated

==== Auditions 4 ====
The fourth and final auditions round was broadcast on 16 October 2014 at 20:55. Nine candidates were chosen for next round. But one favourite candidate Gaël Lopez died almost immediately after the round and the number of qualified candidates reduced to 8.

Candidate	Age	Song	Judges's choices				Total Percentage	Result
Candidate	Age	Song	David	Cathy	Morgan	Cali	Total Percentage	Result
Tanya Michelle	41	Addicted to You - Avicii	✔	✔	✔	✔	90%	Qualified
Alex Copler	21 ans	Alter ego - Jean-Louis Aubert	✔	✔	✘	✔	72%	Qualified
The Turning		What'd I Say - Ray Charles	✔	✔	✔	✔	69%	Eliminated
Inaya	17	Changer - Maître Gims	✔	✔	✔	✔	88%	Qualified
The Garbo	36	Porque te vas - Jeanette Dimech	✔	✔	✔	✔	72%	Qualified
Mélina Bourad	14	Fallin' – Alicia Keys	✔	✔	✔	✘	78%	Qualified
William Matter		Losing My Religion - R.E.M.	✔	✔	✘	✔	79%	Qualified
Milou Leiz	30	Que je t'aime - Johnny Hallyday	✔	✘	✘	✘	22%	Eliminated
Emma Beatson	26	Wasting My Young Years - London Grammar	✘	✘	✘	✔	49%	Eliminated
Fabien Incardona	29	Prendre racine - Calogero	✔	✔	✔	✔	84%	Qualified
Gaël Lopes	25	Prayer in C - Lilly Wood & The Prick	✔	✔	✔	✔	91%	Qualified
Anouchka Strauss	17	Casta Diva, from Norma - Vincenzo Bellini	✔	✔	✔	✔	90%	Qualified

==== Death of contestant Gaël Lopes ====
Gaël Lopes, a popular candidate from day 4 of the auditions broadcast on 16 October 2014 died on 18 October 2014, two days after the broadcast falling from the 4th floor of a building after a reported "delirium". Lopes had sung "Prayer in C" from Lilly Wood and The Prick, attaining 91% with the close of voting. He was just 25 and prior to Rising Star had also auditioned twice for Nouvelle Star in 2010 and 2012. A homage was broadcast in the next show on 23 October 2014 with participants singing "Prayer in C" again as a tribute.

=== Duels ===
In the second stage of competition, the 28 candidates through in the auditions are coupled into 14 pairs by a lottery to confront each other. The first candidate performs with "the wall" lifted throughout the performance. His aim is to attain the highest percentage possible. The confronting candidate has to perform "behind the wall". To pass through to the next stage, the second contestant has to outdo the first performance in percentage points in order to "raise the wall". The candidate with the lower percentage is eliminated even if he/she has attained the 70% barrier. Just like in the auditions, the vote of each panelist counts for 7% of the vote. During each contestant's performance, random pictures of people voting in his favour will appear on screen.

==== Duels 1 ====
The fifth episode of the series and the first of the two duels rounds was broadcast on 23 October 2014 at 20:55. At the end of the episode, all the candidates sang a tribute to parting contestant Gaël Lopes who had died a few days earlier, just 2 days after performing on the show.

Duel	Candidate	Song	Judge's choice				Total percentage	Result
Duel	Candidate	Song	David	Cathy	Morgan	Cali	Total percentage	Result
1	Corentin Grevost	Éblouie par la nuit – Zaz	✔	✔	✔	✔	79%	Qualified
1	Ahmed Mouici	Black or White – Michael Jackson	✔	✔	✘	✔	54%	Eliminated
2	Audrey Passani	Habits (Stay High) – Tove Lo	✔	✔	✔	✔	80%	Qualified
2	MTatiana	Comme un boomerang – Serge Gainsbourg	✔	✔	✔	✔	74%	Eliminated
3	Larry Linch	The Sound of Silence – Paul Simon and Art Garfunkel	✔	✔	✔	✔	83%	Qualified
3	Léo Rispal	Hurt – Christina Aguilera	✔	✔	✔	✔	78%	Eliminated
4	Anne-Sophie Terschan	All I Want for Christmas Is You – Mariah Carey	✔	✔	✘	✔	67%	Eliminated
4	Jordan Chevallier	Born This Way – Lady Gaga	✔	✔	✔	✔	78%	Qualified
5	Fabien Incardona	SOS d'un terrien en détresse - Daniel Balavoine	✔	✔	✔	✔	79 %	Eliminated
5	Mathieu Canaby	If I Ain't Got You – Alicia Keys	✔	✔	✔	✔	81%	Qualified
6	Séverine Romanet	Set Fire to the Rain – Adele	✔	✔	✔	✔	73%	Eliminated
6	Ann-Shirley	Amoureuse – Véronique Sanson	✔	✔	✔	✔	74%	Qualified
7	Anouchka	O Fortuna from Carmina Burana – Carl Orff	✔	✔	✘	✔	71%	Eliminated
7	Tanya Michelle	Titanium – Sia and David Guetta	✔	✔	✔	✔	88%	Qualified

=== Duels 2 ===
The sixth episode, and the second of two duels was broadcast on 30 October 2014 at 20:55.

Duel	Candidate	Song	Judges' choice				Total percentage	Result
Duel	Candidate	Song	David	Cathy	Morgan	Cali	Total percentage	Result
1	Alexandra Miller	Diamonds – Rihanna	✔	✔	✘	✘	44%	Eliminated
1	William Matter	En apesanteur – Calogero	✔	✔	✔	✔	82%	Qualified
2	Melina Bourad	Pas toi – Jean-Jacques Goldman	✘	✘	✘	✘	43%	Eliminated
2	Solène Le Vezo	Alors on danse – Stromae	✔	✔	✔	✔	64%	Qualified
3	Tiwayo	Stolen Dance – Milky Chance	✔	✔	✔	✔	74%	Eliminated
3	Tarik Debbiche	Goodbye My Lover – James Blunt	✔	✔	✔	✔	81%	Qualified
4	Sheila Ray Charles	Rolling in the Deep – Adele	✔	✔	✔	✔	75%	Eliminated
4	Baby's	Happy – Pharrell Williams	✔	✔	✔	✔	76%	Qualified
5	The Garbo	Déshabillez-moi – Juliette Gréco	✘	✔	✘	✘	27%	Eliminated
5	Arno Santamaria	Debout (Je me sens bien) – Arno Santamaria	✔	✔	✔	✔	87%	Qualified
6	Alex Copler	Un autre monde – Téléphone	✔	✔	✔	✔	76%	Eliminated
6	Huu	Locked Out of Heaven – Bruno Mars	✔	✔	✔	✔	78%	Qualified
7	Inaya	People Help the People – Birdy	✔	✔	✔	✔	89%	Qualified
7	Émanuelle Robitaille	Bohemian Rhapsody – Queen	✔	✔	✔	✔	86%	Eliminated

=== Duels of champions ===
In the duel of the champions stage, two candidates are confronted one to one. The names are decided randomly by a lottery. The weight for the panelists is reduced in this stage to 5% each.

The seventh episode was broadcast on 6 November 2014 at 20:55.

Duel	Candidate	Song	Judges' choice				Total percentage	Result
Duel	Candidate	Song	David	Cathy	Morgan	Cali	Total percentage	Result
1	Corentin Grevost	Au café des délices - Patrick Bruel	✔	✔	✔	✔	80%	Qualified
1	William Matter	A Sky Full of Stars - Coldplay	✔	✘	✘	✔	66%	Eliminated
2	Audrey Passani	Video Games - Lana Del Rey					82%	Qualified
2	Solène Le Vezo	Et maintenant - Gilbert Bécaud					54%	Eliminated
3	Ann-Shirley	Empire State of Mind - Jay-Z feat. Alicia Keys					68%	Qualified
3	Tarik Debbiche	Chanter - Florent Pagny	✘	✘	✔	✔	58%	Eliminated
4	Jordan Chevalier	...Baby One More Time - Britney Spears					73%	Qualified
4	Baby's	I Love Rock 'n' Roll - Joan Jett and the Blackhearts					41%	Eliminated
5	Tanya Michelle Smith	Firework - Katy Perry					52%	Eliminated
5	Arno Santamaria	Chez moi - Arno Santamaria					76%	Qualified
6	Larry Linch	Blue Suede Shoes - Elvis Presley	✔	✔	✔	✘	84%	Qualified
6	Huu	When I Was Your Man - Bruno Mars					40%	Eliminated
7	Mathieu Canaby	Imagine - John Lennon					80%	Qualified
7	Inaya	Le droit à l'erreur - Amel Bent					77%	Eliminated but saved by judges

== Final ==
The final was broadcast on 13 November 2014 at 20:50. The final was originally planned for 27 November 2014, but M6 citing lesser than expected viewership, decided to shorten the series by two weeks and do the finals much earlier. Corentin Grevost won the title of French Rising Star.

Candidates	First song	Second song	Judges' choice				Percentage		Average total	Ranking
Candidates	First song	Second song	David	Cathy	Morgan	Cali	First song	Second song	Average total	Ranking
Corentin Grevost	Toi et moi - Guillaume Grand	All of Me - John Legend					80%	68%	14.8%	1st
Arno Santamaria	Des vents contraires - Arno Santamaria	C'est quand le bonheur - Cali					76%	60%	13.6%	2nd
Larry Lynch	La Corrida - Francis Cabrel	Wake Me Up! - Avicii					59%	75%	13.4%	3rd
Inaya	Price Tag - Jessie J	La Bohème - Charles Aznavour					68%	54%	12.2%	4th
Ann-Shirley	I Will Survive - Gloria Gaynor	J'envoie valser - Zazie					70%	45%	11.5%	5th
Mathieu Canaby	Quelques mots d'amour - Michel Berger	Counting Stars - OneRepublic					67%	43%	11.0%	6th
Audrey Passani	Crazy in Love - Beyoncé	Paris-Seychelles - Julien Doré					63%	43%	10.6%	7th
Jordan Chevalier	Feeling Good - Nina Simone	La Seine - Vanessa Paradis/M					43%	47%	9.0%	8th
