= Dilemme =

- No. of days: 56
- No. of housemates: 15
- Winner: Jean-Charles
- Runner-up: Kévin

Dilemme (English: Dilemma) is a French TV reality show broadcasting on W9 in France. It was a reality TV show which aired live. 15 Contestants, 7 men and 8 women got chosen and were split into 2 equal teams. The two teams then competed together and over time each member of the teams was eliminated. Finally once there are 2 candidates left the winner wins a cash prize in a finale where they compete individually.

This game was invented by producer Alexia Laroche-Joubert, was led by Faustine Bollaert and David Lantin (who was competing with competitors). Finally, on July 15, 2010 Jean-Charles Mougenot won with 40% of public votes.

== Nominations Table ==
	Week 1	Week 2	Week 3	Week 4	Week 5	Week 6	Week 7	Week 8	Nominations received
Jean-Charles	Sarah; Ophélie	Kévin; Jason	Kévin; Jason	Caroline; Jeremy	Kévin; Cindy	Kévin	Nominated	Winner (Day 56)	1
Kévin	Sarah; Marie	Raphael; Samir	Samir; Marie; Jason	Lucie-Ange; Florian	Marie; Florian	Alycia	Exempt	Runner-Up (Day 56)	19
Jeremy	Sarah; Ophélie	Raphaël; Samir	Marie; Samir; Kévin	Lucie-Ange; Florian	Marie; Florian	Alycia	Exempt	Third Place (Day 56)	5
Caroline	Sarah; Ophélie	Raphael; Samir	Samir; Marie; Kévin	Lucie-Ange; Florian	Marie; Florian	Alycia	Exempt	Fourth Place (Day 56)	5
Jason	Sarah; Ophélie	Raphael; Samir	Samir; Marie; Kévin	Lucie-Ange; Florian	Marie; Florian	Alycia	Exempt	Fifth Place (Day 56)	14
Cindy	Raphaël; Samir	Jason; Kevin	Samir; Jason	Lucie-Ange; Jeremy; Jason	Marie; Jean-Charles	Jason	Nominated	Evicted (Day 49)	5
Florian	Sarah; Ophélie	Samir; Raphaël	Kévin; Jason	Caroline; Jeremy	Kévin; Cindy	Kévin	Nominated	Evicted (Day 49)	5
Anais	Sarah; Ophélie	Raphaël; Samir	Samir; Marie; Kévin	Lucie-Ange; Florian	Marie; Florian	Alycia	Exempt	Walked (Day 49)	0
Alycia	Sarah; Ophélie	Jason; Kévin	Jason; Kévin	Caroline; Jeremy	Kévin; Cindy	Kévin	Evicted (Day 42)		5
Marie	Sarah; Ophélie	Kévin; Jason	Jason; Kévin	Caroline; Jeremy	Kévin; Cindy	Evicted (Day 35)			14
Lucie-Ange	Sarah; Ophélie	Samir; Raphaël	Kévin; Samir	Caroline; Jeremy	Evicted (Day 28)				6
Samir	Sarah; Ophélie	Kévin; Jason	Jason; Kévin	Evicted (Day 21)					15
Raphael	Sarah; Ophélie	Jason; Kévin	Evicted (Day 14)						8
Ophélie	Sarah; Marie	Walked (Day 9)							11
Sarah	Lucie-Ange; Marie	Evicted (Day 7)							13
Up for eviction	Ophélie; Sarah	Raphaël; Samir	Jason; Kévin; Samir	Jeremy; Lucie-Ange	Florian; Marie	Alycia; Caroline	Cindy; Florian; Jean-Charles	Caroline; Jason; Jean-Charles; Jeremy; Kévin	
Walked	none	Ophélie	none						
Evicted	Sarah; 45% to save	Raphaël; 30% to save	Samir; 32% to save	Lucie-Ange; 31% to save	Marie; 36% to save	Alycia; 40% to save	Anaïs; Anaïs & Jeremy's dilemma	Jason; Caroline; Jeremy; Kévin; Fewest votes to win	
Evicted	Sarah; 45% to save	Raphaël; 30% to save	Samir; 32% to save	Lucie-Ange; 31% to save	Marie; 36% to save	Alycia; 40% to save	Cindy; Florian; Fewest votes to save	Jean-Charles; 40% to win	
