= Château de Groussay =

Coordinates: 48°46′45″N 1°49′16″E

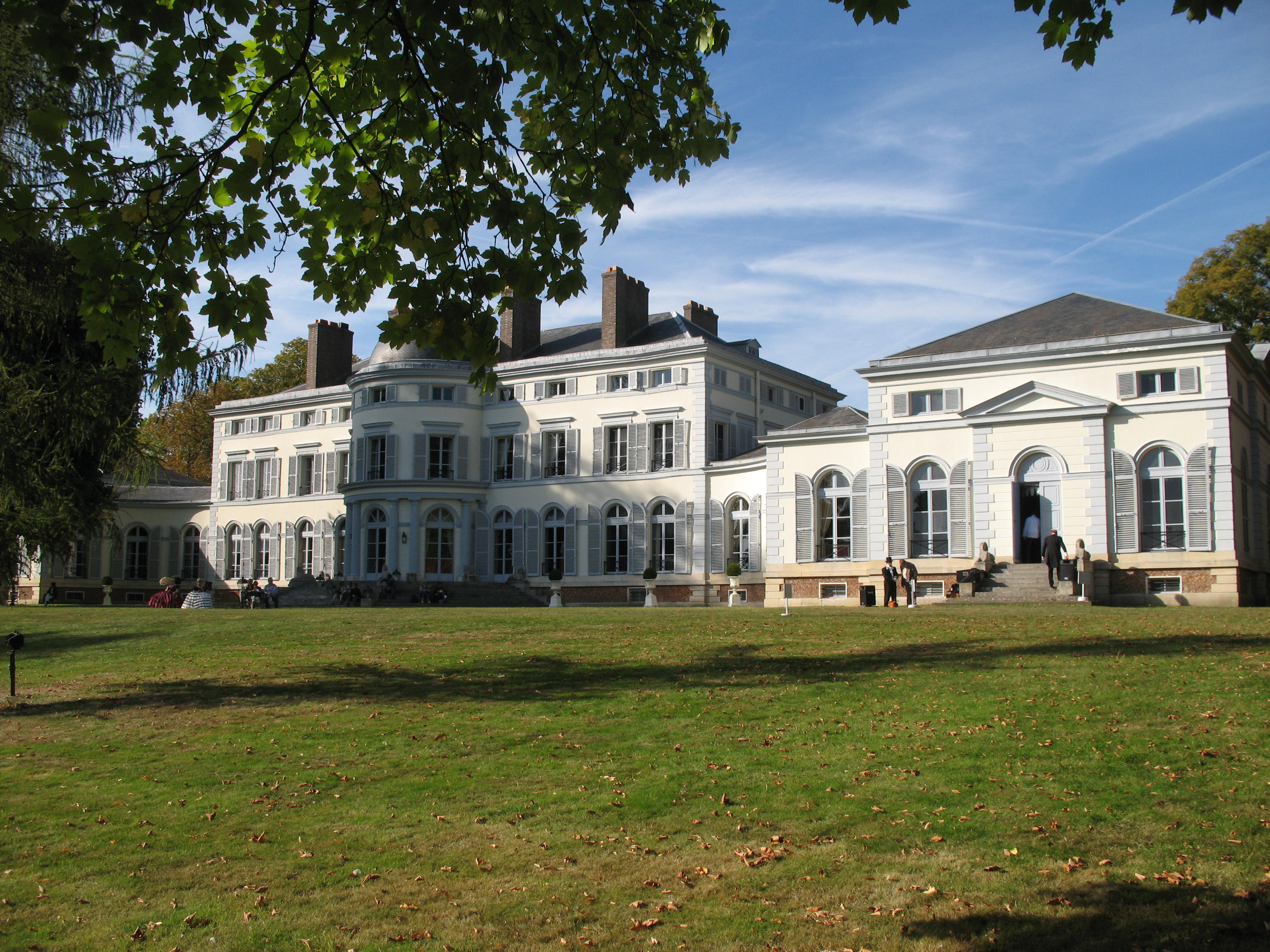
The Château de Groussay's garden front

The Château de Groussay is located in the town of Montfort-l'Amaury, in the Department of Yvelines, west of Paris, in France. The Château was built in 1815 by the duchesse de Charest, a daughter of Louise Elisabeth de Croÿ-Havré, marquise de Tourzel, the governess of the royal enfants de France of Louis XVI and Marie Antoinette.

== History ==
The Château was purchased in 1938-39 by the Spanish aesthete Carlos de Beistegui, who enlarged it, with the professional help of Emilio Terry. Cecil Beaton's inspiration for Henry Higgins' library in My Fair Lady was the library at Groussay.

Beistegui created new gardens, inspired by the Anglo-Chinese gardens of the 18th century and by an 18th-century copper tent in the royal gardens of Drottningholm Palace in Sweden. They feature a Chinese pagoda, a labyrinth, a theater of verdure, a Tartar tent, and other follies. The Gardens are classified by the French government as one of the Remarkable Gardens of France.

After Beistegui's death in 1970, the Château passed to his brother, and then his nephew, who sold it in 1999, realizing $26.5 million for the contents alone, many of which had come from another of Carlos de Beistegui's homes, the Palazzo Labia in Venice. In 2012, it was sold again and the owner is Rubis International managed by Bekhzod Akhmedov.

== Description of interior ==
The British MP and diarist Henry Channon stayed at Groussay as a guest of Beistegui in 1946. Channon (who was noted for the lavish elegance of his own town and country houses) described the Château as being plain and old fashioned. With the aim of 19th century restoration Beistegui had replaced modern bathrooms with Victorian style ones, hung bedrooms with Balmoral tartans and installed stag heads. Channon did however acknowledge "the really remarkable library" as being "sumptuous and superb".

The château and park of Groussay appeared in Marc Allégret's last film Le Bal du comte d'Orgel (1970).

== Gallery ==
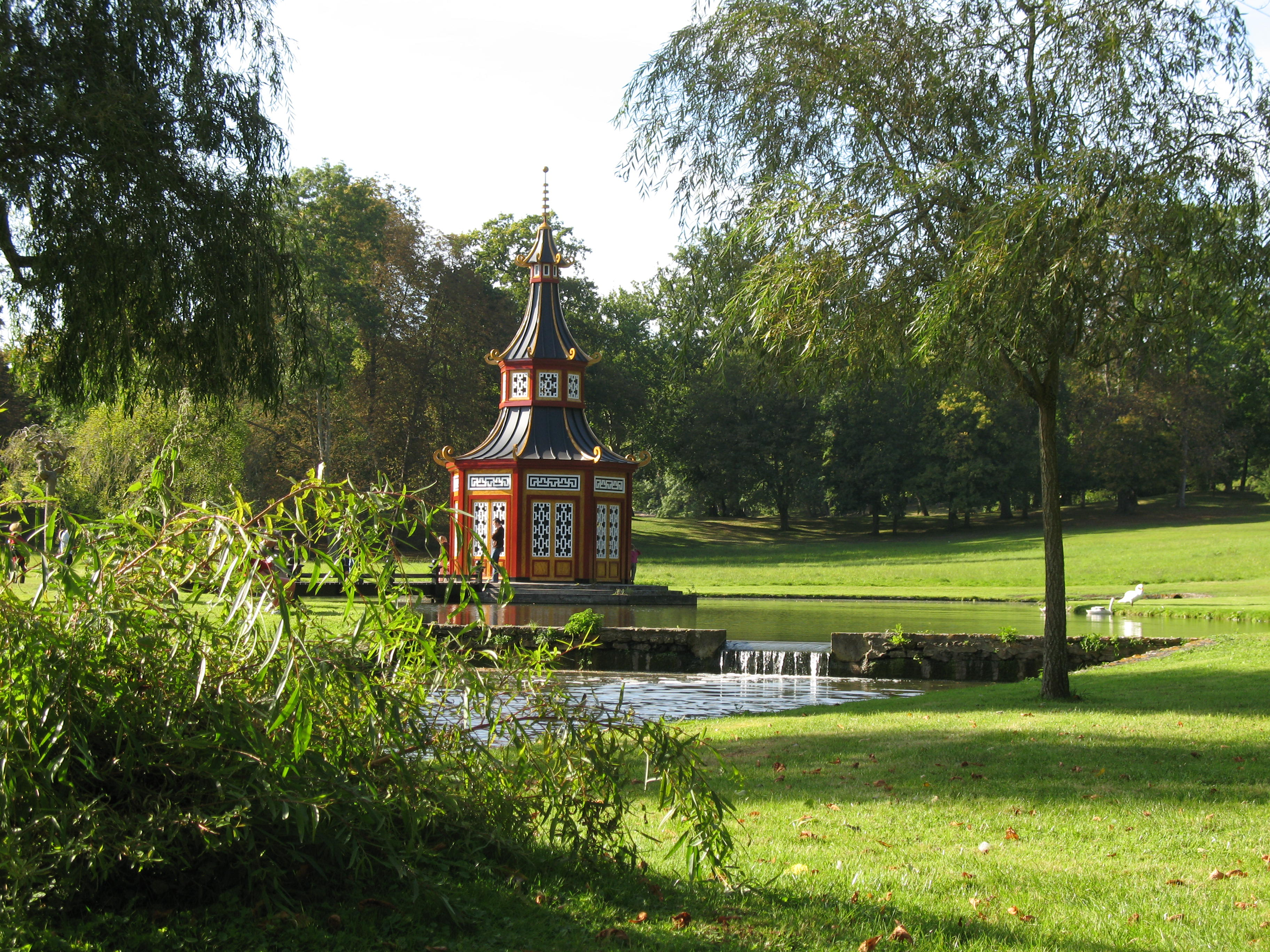
The Chinese pagoda

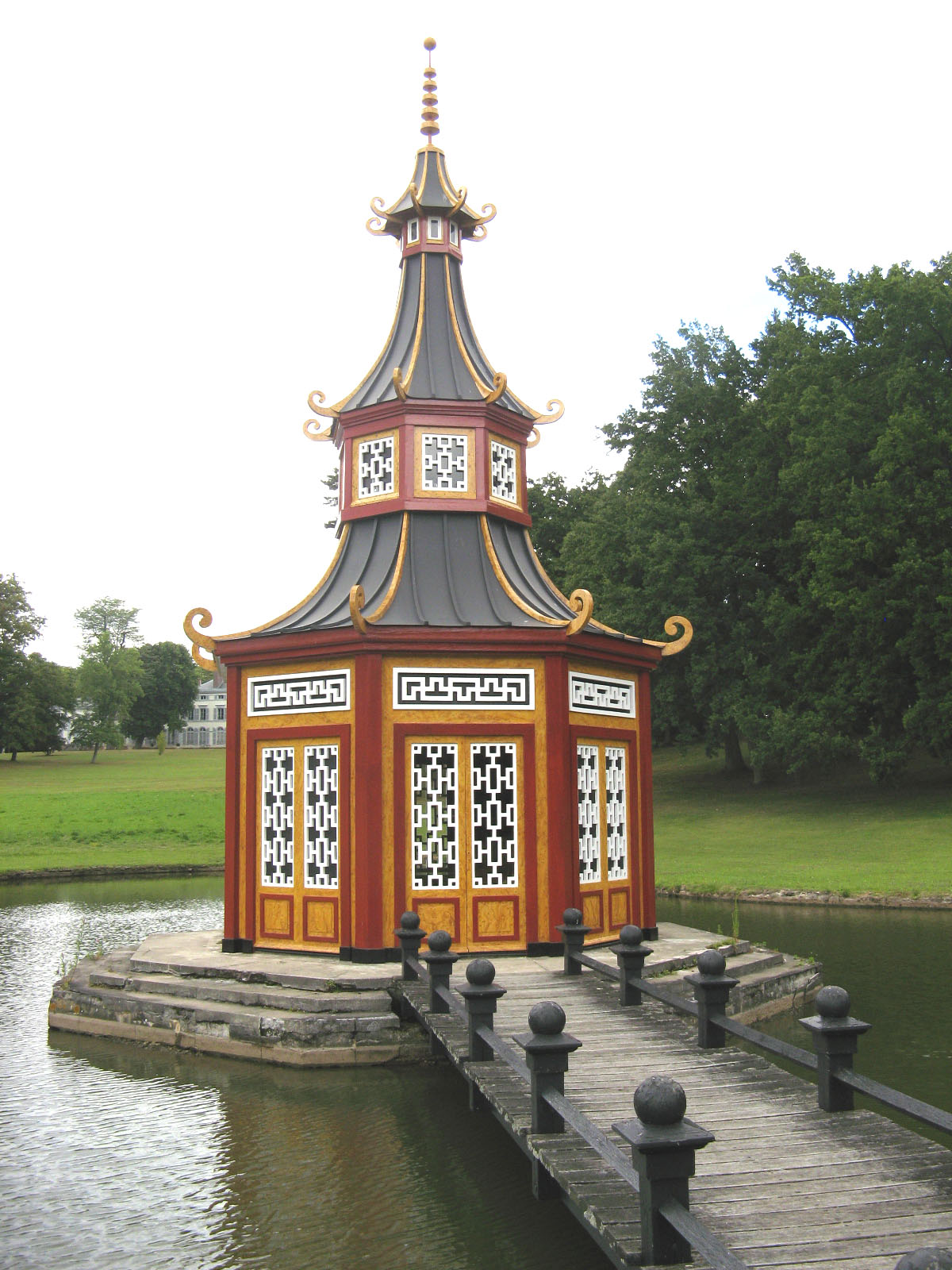
The Chinese pagoda

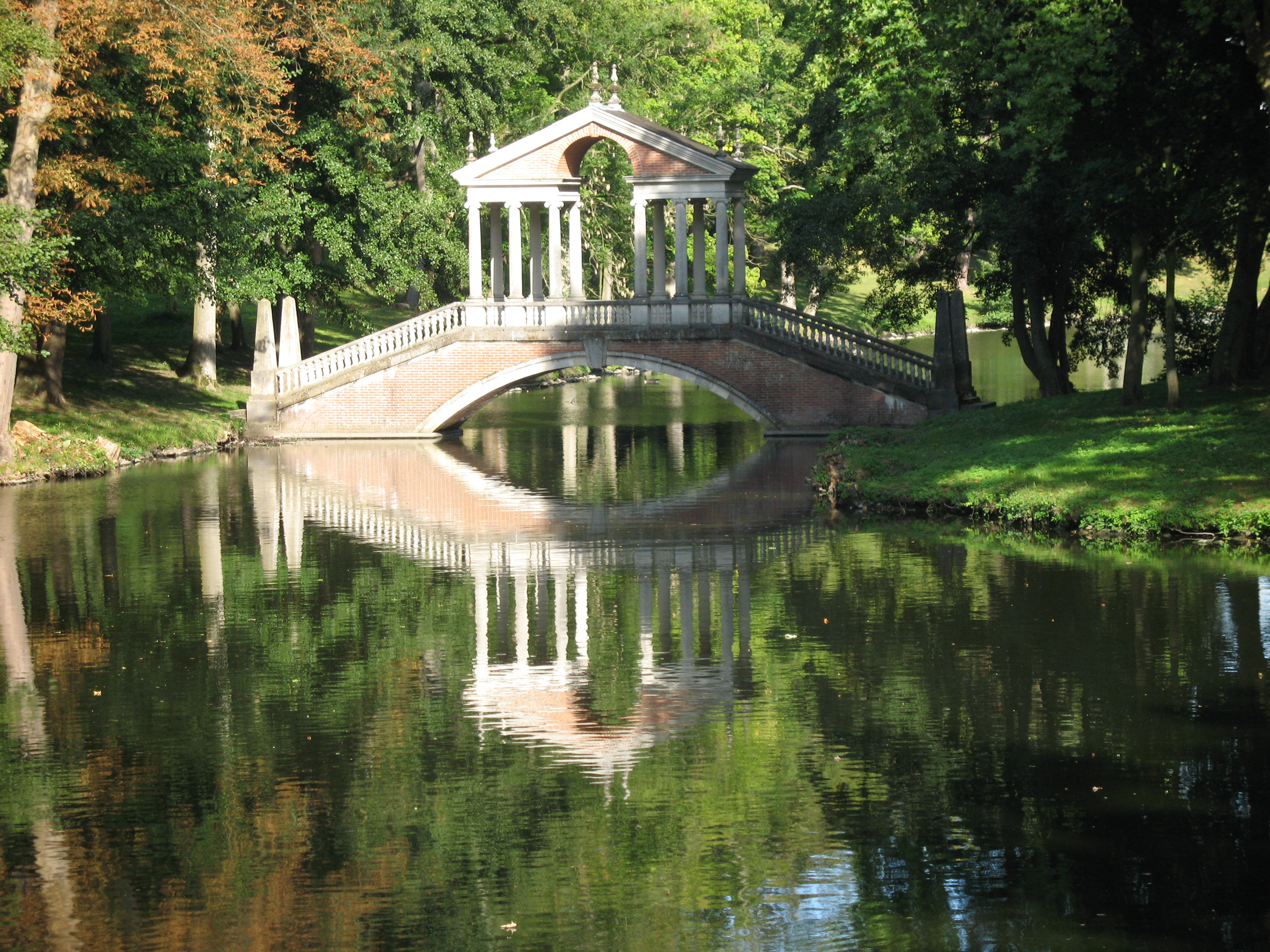
Pont palladien

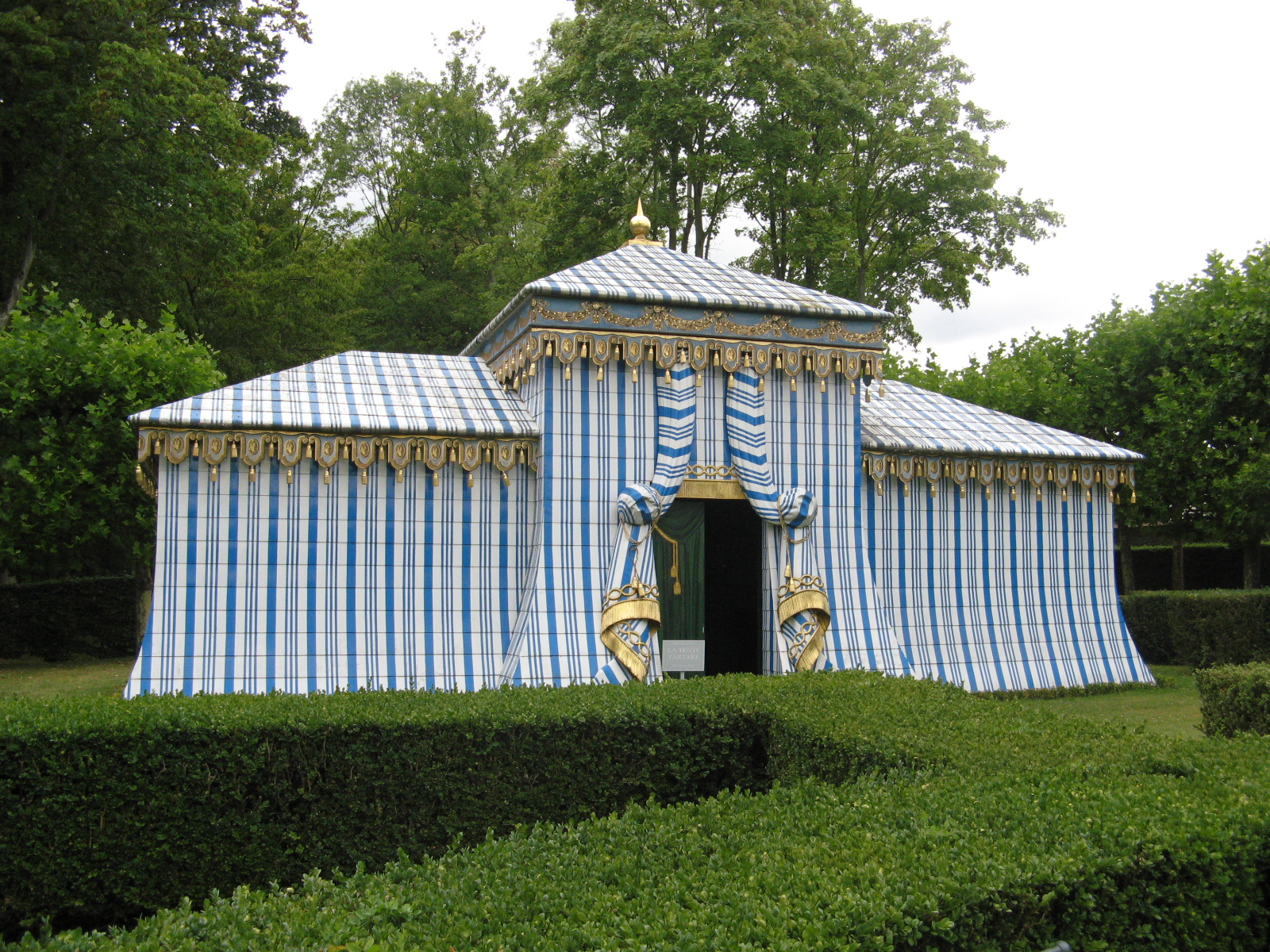
La Tente tartare

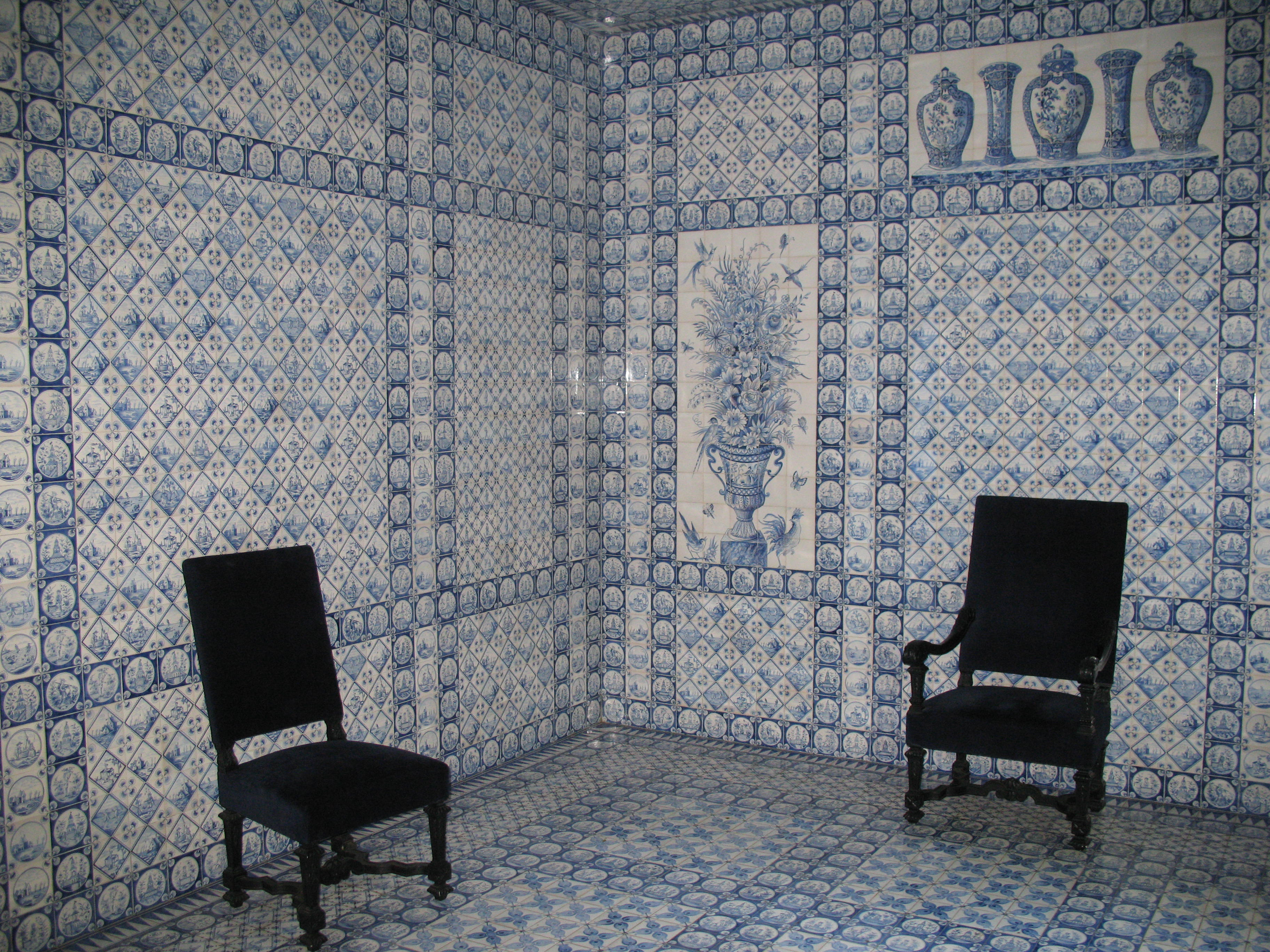
The interior from Tente tartare

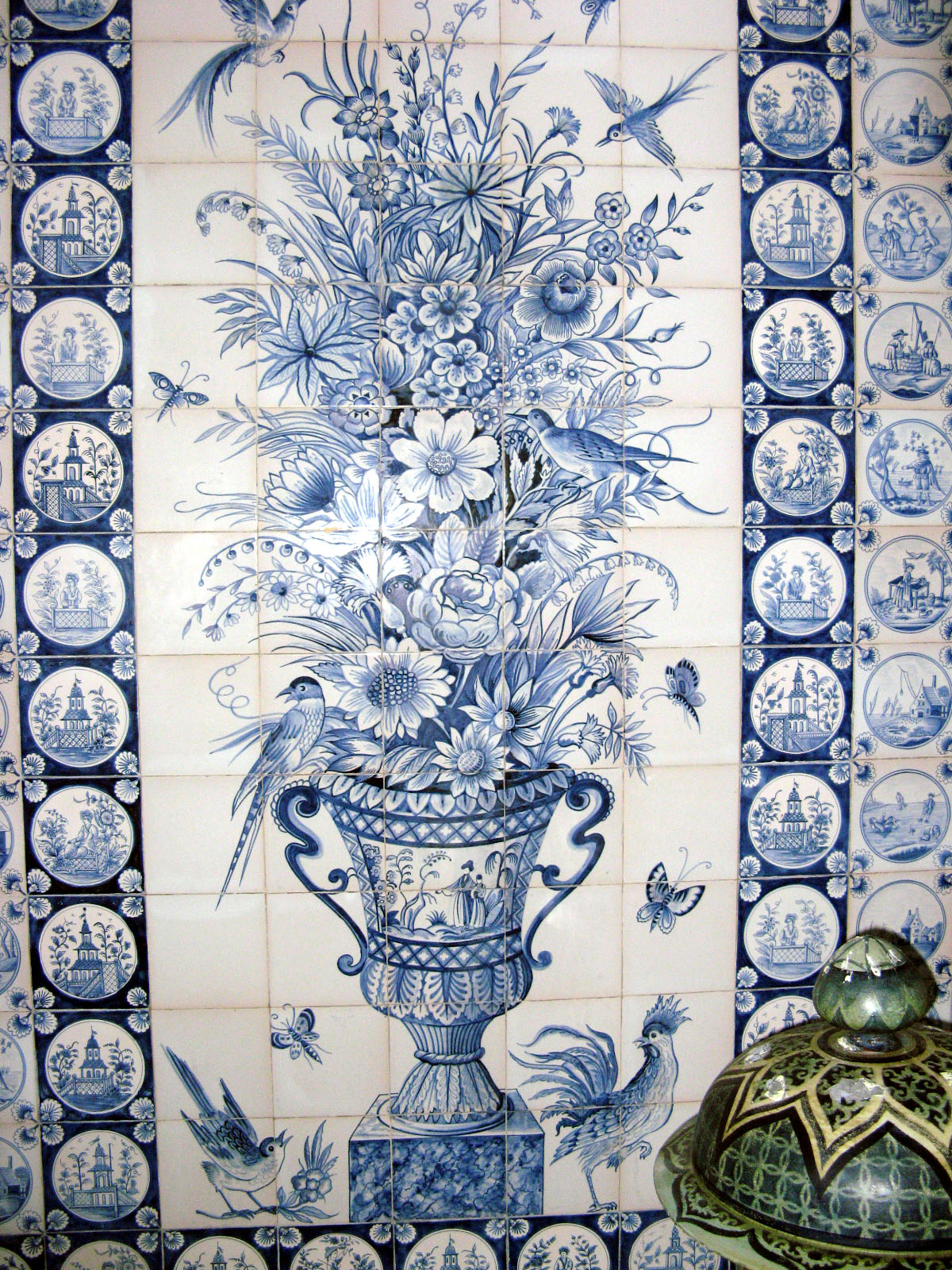
Detail from the interior of Tente tartare

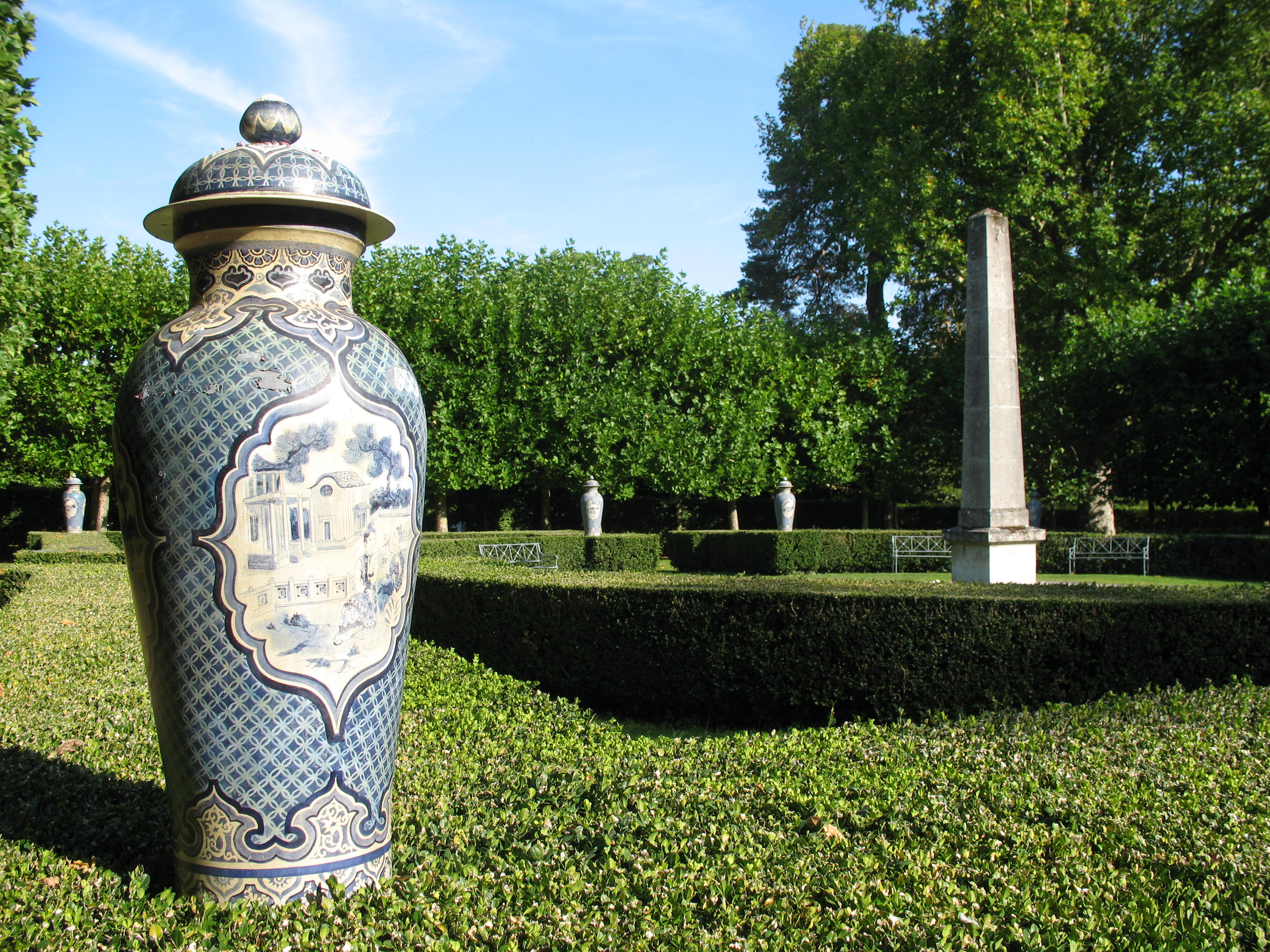
The park

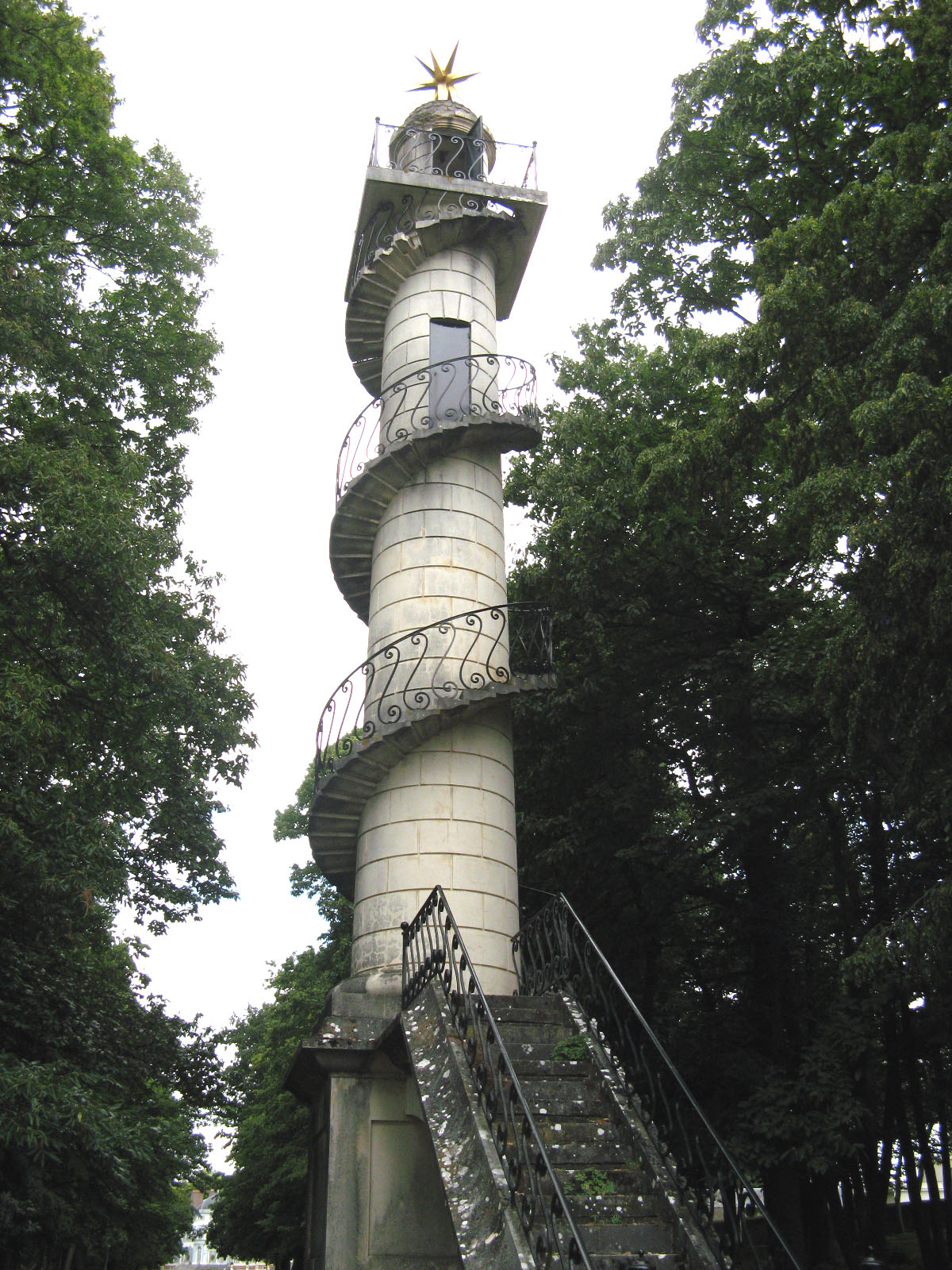
La Colonne Observatoire
