= Faustine Bollaert =

French journalist, radio and television presenter

- Born: Faustine Brigitte Suzanne Faraggi; 20 March 1979 (age 47); Paris, France
- Occupations: Journalist, radio presenter, television presenter
- Years active: 2002–present (television)
- Notable credit(s): Dilemme; Accès privé 100% Mag; Le Meilleur Pâtissier; Rising Star; Ça commence aujourd'hui
- Television: France 2 (2005–2009); W9, M6 (2010–2017); France Télévisions (2017–present)

Faustine Bollaert (born 20 March 1979) is a French journalist, radio and television presenter.

== Early life and career ==
Born Faustine Faraggi in Paris, she is of Breton and Italian descent. She then took the name Faustine Bollaert, the family name of her mother. She studied journalism at the ISCPA (Institut Supérieur de la Communication, de la Presse et de l'Audiovisuel) in Paris.

She began her career in printed press as a journalist for the weekly magazine Télé 7 Jours from 2002 to 2005 and then a journalist for the television section of the weekly magazine Closer.

== Radio career ==
In 2004, she joined Jean-Marc Morandini on Europe 1 and became a columnist for his radio program Le grand direct des médias. In 2007, she hosted the radio program Faut qu'on en parle on Europe 1. From August 2008 to July 2011, she presented the afternoon program Et si c'était ça le bonheur ? on Europe 1 Monday to Friday. In August 2011, she became a columnist for the radio program Faites entrer l'invité, hosted by Michel Drucker on Europe 1. In September 2015, she joined France Bleu to present every weekend an interview program, Je suis d'où je viens.

== Television career ==
In summer 2002, she debuted on television as a columnist for the program Côté vacances on France 3. The next summer, she co-hosted with Stéphane Basset the game show Décrochez vos vacances. She then continued to work as a columnist for various television programs. In September 2006, she was a columnist on the program Vivement dimanche prochain..., which was hosted by Michel Drucker on France 2.

In April 2010, she left France Télévisions to present a new reality program on W9, Dilemme. She presented the program Accès privé on M6 during Virginie Guilhaume's maternity leave and then replaced her after her departure for France 2. From September 2012 to June 2014, she replaced Estelle Denis in hosting 100% Mag.

In November and December 2012, she presented the first season of the pastry contest Le Meilleur Pâtissier broadcast on M6 on Monday evening. She also hosted Le Meilleur Pâtissier, à vos fourneaux, which was broadcast just after. She then presented the next seasons of the contest until the fifth one in 2016.

In September 2014, she co-hosted with Guillaume Pley a new talent show titled Rising Star on M6. It lasted less than the planned 16 weeks because of a low viewership.

She arrived on France 2 to present since 28 August 2017 the early afternoon daily testimonial program Ça commence aujourd'hui. Since 2 September 2019, she presents a spin-off program in the morning titled Ça commence aujourd'hui, des nouvelles de nos invités.

In December 2017, she participated at the presentation of the 31st edition of the Téléthon with Bruno Guillon and the spokesperson Zazie on France 5. She then presented the Christmas program Mon joyeux Noël on France 4 at the first part of the evening.

In July 2018, she presents at the first part of the evening À table ! Mangez sain, dépensez moins on France 2 with Yves Camdeborde, a nutrition program about the food habits of French people that also gives dietetic and practical advices.

Since September 2018, she presents on France 4 the program Il était une fois in company of columnists. On every episode, she talks about a year with a guest.

Since 18 October 2019, she presents on primetime on France 3 the program La boîte à secrets, where she receives three guests who confide their biggest professional and personal secrets.

== Personal life ==
She is married to the French writer Maxime Chattam. They have a daughter and a son.
