= Les Minikeums =

French children's television show (1993–2002)

- Also known as: MNK (2000–2002); Génération Minikeums (2006–2009)
- Genre: Youth; Comedy
- Created by: Arnold Boiseau; Patrice Levallois; Alain Duverne
- Inspired by: Guignols de l'info (Canal+)
- Directed by: Éric Chevalier; Matthieu Bayle; Frank Chiche; Stéphane Subiela; Nicolas Cahen; Pascal Tosi; Pascal Meunier
- Presented by: Les Minikeums
- Voices of: Gérald Dahan; Laurent Almosnino; Lucile Gaut; Sandrine Alexi; Didier Gustin; Mathieu Schalk; Julie Victor; Issa Doumbia; Roddy Julienne
- Composers: Roddy Julienne; Philippe Almosnino
- Country of origin: France
- Original language: French
- No. of seasons: 11
- No. of episodes: Around 4,500

Production
- Executive producers: Adventure Line Productions (ex. Tilt / Anabase / Expand Images)
- Producers: Laurent Almosnino; Alexia Laroche-Joubert
- Production company: ALP (ex. Tilt Productions / Anabase Productions / Expand Images)

Original release
- Network: France 3
- Release: March 31, 1993 – March 31, 2002
- Network: France 4
- Release: December 11, 2017 – August 27, 2021

The Minikeums is a French TV children's TV program with puppets that was broadcast on France 3 from March 31, 1993, to March 31, 2002.

It went on from 1 to 2 hours, that is to say from 7 am (8 am at the beginning) to 9 am, and then from 4h40 pm to 7h40 pm on weekdays, which permitted to broadcast a succession of parodies, cartoons and other sections.

== History ==
Created by Arnold Boiseau and Patrice Levallois, the Minikeums were firstly the caricature of characters the most liked and hated by children. These characters were all imagined at the age of 10 to 13 years. At the beginning, they were 7, and as it became popular, they were about fifteen latex mini celebrities, created by Alain Duverne, livened up and led the youth slot of children. It's a container conceptdesigned to win the loyalty of the public thanks to youth program from France 3. Used like transitions between 2 cartoons with short scenes, they accumulated roles of presenters, famous singers and actors.

Between 2 programs, the puppets made some sketches (Taratatouille, Questions sous un lampion …); then, some stories more longer were added, with appearance of the Cinékeum in 1996 (frequently pastiches of famous works). Panikeum in 2000 is a movie which stages them, which has been broadcast on December 31, 1999. The puppets also recorded many songs, one of the most famous is Ma Mélissa, which is a cult parody (quite corrosive for a youth program) of boysbands, become gold disc in 1997, which is the most important proof of their passing. It's important to note that Minikeums were the only to have made a hit which was in favour of the Blues during the Football World Cup in 1998 (We will win it).

For this program, Jean-Marc Lengien, the author - dialogue writer – scriptwriter, was inspired by people who makes him laugh: "from Charlot to Tati for the veine visuelle, from the brothers David and Jerry Zucker to Mel Brooks for all that is zany, a great dose of Monty Pythonet for English humour, Woody Allen for hassles, from de Funès, a little of Spendid, some of Deschamps, because we like French humour, a dash of Desproges so that to darken humour, a bristle of comic strip to fill in the squares and then a tear from Queneau or Perec for the love of words."

== Puppets ==
Most puppets is caricatures, in youngers, of celebrities of the 1990s.

Coco (Antoine de Caunes): the Minikeum who appears most of the time. He is unlucky, fearful, clumsy, grouchy, and has others faults which make him very funny. In the Cinékeums, he always plays a role of anti-heroes, and sometimes a role of a bad guy (but more idiot than really cruel). Despite his faults, Coco is sometimes a really good friend. He also tries to charm girls who catch the eye to him (literal as figurative sense). That’s the real star of the Minikeums.

Diva (Ève Baron) : in the Cinékeums she often plays a role of femme fatale.

Jojo (Johnny Hallyday): he is the lover of the group; he is joker, singer and seducer. He is the official boyfriend of Vaness. Jojo reproduces sometimes sentences and gestures of his model.

Nag (Nagui): he is close to Coco; he is simple, blunderer and naïve, but very joyful and friendly with about everybody. He is in love with Zaza, which makes him well. He is big-hearted and comfort sometimes his friends. His recurrent reply is “Hou là!” when he does a blunder.

M’se (MC Solaar): energetic and rebel, he loves rap. He is the one that we see least [je trouve qu'il manque qlq ch, alors peut-être que He is the less showed irait mieux], he is the more present in sketches.

Vaness (Vanessa Paradis) : Jojo’s girlfriend and best friend of Zaza. She is a much less pretentious and nicer than Diva, and that gives to her a lot of success close to boys. She often plays roles of princess.

Zaza (Elsa Lunghini) : The youngest sister of Minimeuks. Very juvenile (she lisps) and naïve, she is the best friend of Vaness. Bernard is her first boyfriend (see the song of the 32 of July), then scriptwriters will prefer her in love with Nag. In the most recent stories, Zaza has often the leading actor, thanks to her sweet but brave personality.

=== Animated Series ===
- The Adventures of Tintin
- Angela Anaconda
- Alvin and the Chipmunks
- Jackie Chan Adventures
