= Cyril Lignac =

French chef (born 1977)

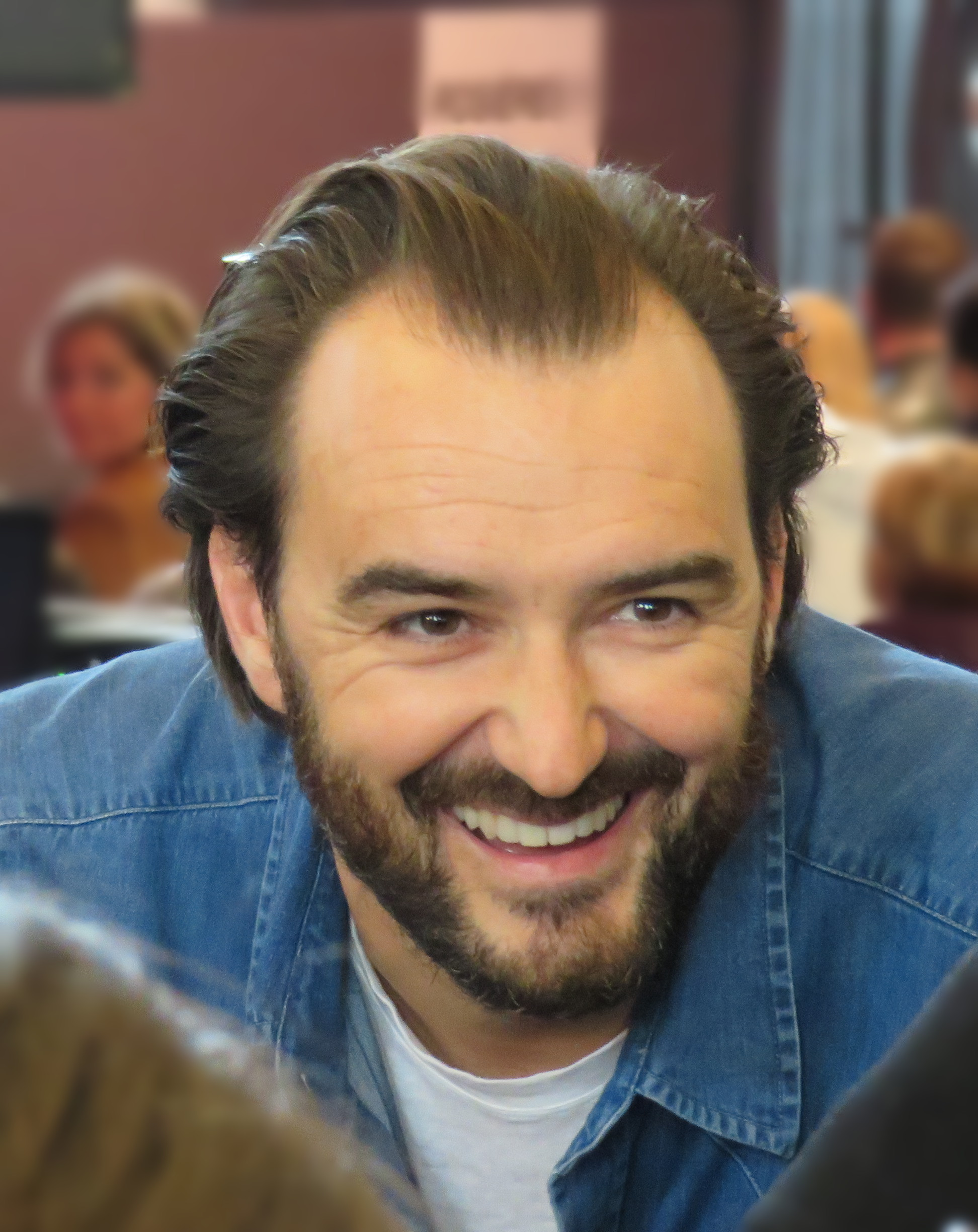
- Cyril Lignac during a signing session at the Salon du Chocolat 2017
- Born: 5 November 1977 (age 48); Rodez, France
- Culinary career
- Current restaurant(s): Le Quinzième (one Michelin-starred), Le Chardenoux, Aux Prés
- Television show(s): Yes chef !, chef, the recipe, Live in canteen !, Get Chef'd, Top Chef, the Great Bake Off
- Website: www.cyrillignac.com

Cyril Lignac (French pronunciation: [siʁil liɲak]; born 5 November 1977) is a French chef.

He is owner and chef of the gourmet restaurant Le Quinzième (1 Michelin star), also of Le Chardenoux, a Parisian bistro located in the 11th arrondissement of Paris, another bistro located in the Saint-Germain des Près district: Aux Prés and two pastry shops La Pâtisserie Cyril Lignac located in the 11th arrondissement of Paris and in the 16th arrondissement of Paris. Since 2010, his workshop Cuisine Attitude located in the 3rd arrondissement of Paris, had provided cooking and pastry classes. Chef Lignac is also TV presenter for culinary programs on the French television channel M6, and signed a series of more than 40 cookbooks which sold over 3 million copies.

== Biography ==
=== Apprenticeship ===
After an apprenticeship in his native region of Aveyron in Southwestern France, Cyril Lignac made his way to Paris in 2000 to work in the kitchen of L'Arpège, the restaurant of chef Alain Passard. He honed his skills alongside brothers Jacques and Laurent Pourcel at La Maison Blancheand Le Jardin des Sens.

=== Installation in Paris ===
In 2005 he opened his own gourmet restaurant Le Quinzième in Paris. In 2008, he took over the Parisian bistro Le Chardenoux, a listed historical monument. In 2011 he brought the Chardenoux bistro concept to a new venue in the Saint-Germain des Prés when he took over the Claude Sainlouis, renaming it Aux Prés. That same year, Cyril Lignac went into a new project and opened with Benoît Couvrand La Pâtisserie Cyril Lignac in Paris. In 2013, they opened their second boutique in the 16th arrondissement of Paris, in the Chaillot district, facing Galliera Palace.

The chef received his first Michelin Guide star on 27 February 2012, for his gourmet restaurant Le Quinzième.

== Other activities ==
=== TV programmes ===
Cyril Lignac was spotted by the producer Bibiane Godfroid, who bought the rights to the show Jamie's Kitchen by Jamie Oliver and broadcast on Channel 4. He became a media figure by participating in several programs broadcast on M6 channel:

- 2005 : Oui chef !;
- 2006 : Chef, la recette !;
- 2007 : Vive la cantine !;
- 2009 : Chef Contre Attaque;
- 2010 : MIAM : Mon invitation à manger, performed by his own production company KFP (Kitchen Factory Productions);
- from 2011 until today: "100% Terroirs" broadcast every Friday in 100% Mag program;
- 2012 : Le Chef en France, programs dedicated to French regions and their culinary heritage;
- 2012 : Le Meilleur Pâtissier, the French version of The Great British Bake Off, an amateur pastry competition.
- 2020 : Tous en cuisine, program where he cooks a meal live with 6 families on their webcams.
- 2020 : Chef contre chef.

=== Publications ===
Cyril Lignac has published about forty cookbooks, including Génération Chef, Cuisine Attitude, or Le Chardenoux, edited by Hachette Pratique. At spring 2012, he signed a Best of in collaboration with Alain Ducasse edition and in September 2012 Le Chardenoux des Près. La cuisine de mon bistrot with Hachette. From 2007 to 2011, he was editorial adviser for the bimonthly magazine Cuisine by Cyril Lignac, published by Paper Box.

=== Community involvement ===
In 2008 Cyril Lignac was chosen to support Un fruit pour la récré by the French ministry of Agriculture, a program of free fruits distribution in schools.

== Distinctions ==
On 11 May 2009 Michel Barnier gave him the title of Chevalier of the Order of Agricultural Merit.

In 2012 Cyril Lignac received his first Michelin Guide star for his gourmet restaurant Le Quinzième. At the same time, GQ Magazine recognized the chef when they named him "Chef of the Year".

== Personal life ==
In 2012 through the end of 2013, Lignac was in a personal relationship with French journalist and television presenter Marie Drucker.
