= La France a un incroyable talent: La Bataille Du Jury =

La France a un incroyable talent: La Bataille Du Jury aired from June 23, 2020 to July 14, 2020 as a spin-off to the main show, La France a un incroyable talent. Éric Antoine, Hélène Ségara, Marianne James and Sugar Sammy all returned as judges. David Ginola returned as the TV presenter of the show. Each judge chose a team of six contestants, which included five contestants from previous seasons of La France a un incroyable talent and one contestant from an international version of the series, including acts from Britain's Got Talent and America's Got Talent. The winner of the season and the €100,000 prize was motorcyclist Kenny Thomas from team Hélène Ségara. The runner-up was improvisational comedic singer Thomas Boissy from team Éric Antoine.

== Contestant Overview ==
The season featured 24 different acts, 23 of which had previously competed on either La France a un incroyable talent, America's Got Talent or Britain's Got Talent. These acts included previous winners, runner-ups, finalists and semifinalists. One act, Red Devils (on team Marianne James), had not previously competed on any Got Talent show.

Participant	Act	Got Talent History	Team	Result
Antonio	Magician	FGT 11: Winner	Éric Antoine	Eliminated (The Duels)
Ben Blaque	Crossbow Shooter	BGT 10: Semifinalist AGT 7: Quarterfinalist	Sugar Sammy	Eliminated (The Finals)
Berywam	Beatboxing Group	FGT 13: 3rd Place AGT 14: Quarterfinalist	Éric Antoine	Eliminated (The Finals)
Caroline Costa	Singer	FGT 3: Runner-Up	Sugar Sammy	Eliminated (The Duels)
Cécile & Roman	Aerialist Duo	FGT 10: 4th Place	Éric Antoine	Eliminated (The Finals)
Dakota & Nadia	Dance Duo	FGT 13: Runner-Up AGT 14: Participant	Sugar Sammy	Eliminated (Top 6)
David Stone	Magician	FGT 13: Finalist	Hélène Ségara	Eliminated (The Duels)
Die Mobiles	Shadow Dance Group	FGT 7: Winner	Marianne James	Eliminated (The Duels)
Duo MainTenanT	Acrobatic Dance Duo	FGT 5: Finalist AGT 14: Participant	Hélène Ségara	Eliminated (Top 6)
Farès	Rapper	FGT 13: 5th Place	Sugar Sammy	Eliminated (The Duels)
Jean-Baptiste Guégan	Singer	FGT 13: Winner	Éric Antoine	Eliminated (The Finals)
Jessie & Vivien	Dance Duo	FGT 11: 5th Place	Hélène Ségara	Eliminated (The Duels)
Katya & Nikita	Aerialist Duo	FGT 13: Semifinalist	Hélène Ségara	Eliminated (The Duels)
Kenny Thomas	Motorcyclist	FGT 11: 4th Place AGT 13: Participant	Hélène Ségara	Winner
Les French Twins	Multimedia Magic Duo	FGT 11: Finalist AGT 12: Participant	Marianne James	Eliminated (Top 6)
Les Fréres Chaix	Control Line Plane Duo	FGT 6: Finalist	Marianne James	Eliminated (The Duels)
Les Frères Jacquard	Band	FGT 13: Finalist	Marianne James	Eliminated (The Duels)
Marc Métral	Ventriloquist	BGT 9: Semifinalist	Hélène Ségara	Eliminated (The Duels)
RB Dance Company	Tap Dance Group	FGT 13: 4th Place	Sugar Sammy	Eliminated (The Finals)
Red Devils	Dance Group	N/A	Marianne James	Eliminated (The Finals)
Rémi Martin	Pole Acrobat	FGT 13: Finalist	Marianne James	Third Place
Tape Face	Comedian	AGT 11: Finalist	Éric Antoine	Eliminated (The Duels)
Thomas Boissy	Comedy Singer	FGT 6: 4th Place	Éric Antoine	Runner-Up
Uekusa	Novelty Act	FGT 13: Finalist BGT 12: Semifinalist AGT 13: Participant	Sugar Sammy	Eliminated (The Duels)

== The Duels ==
The first round of the season featured duels between two acts from different teams. After both performances, the audience and the two judges who did not have acts from their team competing in the duel would vote on which act should move on to the next round. Each of these three voting parties would count for one-third of the total vote. Whichever act received the majority of the votes would remain in the competition, and the opposing act would be eliminated. 12 out of 24 acts advanced to the next round.

Episode 1

Duel	Order	Participant	Act	Team	Audience Vote	Éric Antoine	Hélène Ségara	Marianne James	Sugar Sammy
Duel 1	1	Caroline Costa	Singer	Sugar Sammy					
Duel 1	2	Jean-Baptiste Guégan	Singer	Éric Antoine					
Duel 2	3	Die Mobiles	Shadow Dance Group	Marianne James					
Duel 2	4	Kenny Thomas	Motorcyclist	Hélène Ségara					
Duel 3	5	Antonio	Magician	Éric Antoine					
Duel 3	6	Dakota & Nadia	Dance Duo	Sugar Sammy					
Duel 4	7	Thomas Boissy	Comedy Singer	Éric Antoine					
Duel 4	8	Marc Métral	Ventriloquist	Hélène Ségara					

Episode 2

Duel	Order	Participant	Act	Team	Audience Vote	Éric Antoine	Hélène Ségara	Marianne James	Sugar Sammy
Duel 1	1	Cécile & Roman	Aerialist Duo	Éric Antoine					
Duel 1	2	Les Frères Jacquard	Band	Marianne James					
Duel 2	3	Les Fréres Chaix	Control Line Plane Duo	Marianne James					
Duel 2	4	Ben Blaque	Crossbow Shooter	Sugar Sammy					
Duel 3	5	Duo MainTenanT	Acrobatic Dance Duo	Hélène Ségara					
Duel 3	6	Uekusa	Novelty Act	Sugar Sammy					
Duel 4	7	Berywam	Beatboxing Group	Éric Antoine					
Duel 4	8	David Stone	Magician	Hélène Ségara					

Episode 3

Duel	Order	Participant	Act	Team	Audience Vote	Éric Antoine	Hélène Ségara	Marianne James	Sugar Sammy
Duel 1	1	RB Dance Company	Tap Dance Group	Sugar Sammy					
Duel 1	2	Katya & Nikita	Aerialist Duo	Hélène Ségara					
Duel 2	3	Farès	Rapper	Sugar Sammy					
Duel 2	4	Les French Twins	Multimedia Magic Duo	Marianne James					
Duel 3	5	Tape Face	Comedian	Éric Antoine					
Duel 3	6	Rémi Martin	Pole Acrobat	Marianne James					
Duel 4	7	Jessie & Vivien	Dance Duo	Hélène Ségara					
Duel 4	8	Red Devils	Dance Group	Marianne James					

== The Finals ==
The second round of the season featured six more duels between two different acts, who were selected at random. These duels did not require the acts competing against each other to be from separate teams. After both performances, the audience and the two judges who did not have acts from their team competing in the duel would vote on which act should move on to the final six and have the opportunity to win the Battle of the Judges and the €100,000 prize. Each of these three voting parties would count for one-third of the total vote. Whichever act received the majority of the votes would remain in the competition, and the opposing act would be eliminated. 6 out of 12 acts advanced to the next round.

In the event that a duel featured two acts from the same team competing against each other, after both performances the audience and the three judges who did not have acts from their team competing in the duel would vote on which act should move on to the final six. Each of these four voting parties would count for one-fourth of the total vote. Whichever act received the majority of the votes would remain in the competition, and the opposing act would be eliminated.

Episode 4

Duel	Order	Participant	Act	Team	Audience Vote	Éric Antoine	Hélène Ségara	Marianne James	Sugar Sammy
Duel 1	1	Rémi Martin	Pole Acrobat	Marianne James					
Duel 1	2	RB Dance Company	Tap Dance Group	Sugar Sammy					
Duel 2	3	Duo MainTenanT	Acrobatic Dance Duo	Hélène Ségara					
Duel 2	4	Ben Blaque	Crossbow Shooter	Sugar Sammy					
Duel 3	5	Berywam	Beatboxing Group	Éric Antoine					
Duel 3	6	Thomas Boissy	Comedy Singer	Éric Antoine					
Duel 4	7	Dakota & Nadia	Dance Duo	Sugar Sammy					
Duel 4	8	Cécile & Roman	Aerialist Duo	Éric Antoine					
Duel 5	9	Jean-Baptiste Guégan	Singer	Éric Antoine					
Duel 5	10	Kenny Thomas	Motorcyclist	Hélène Ségara					
Duel 6	11	Les French Twins	Multimedia Magic Duo	Marianne James					
Duel 6	12	Red Devils	Dance Group	Marianne James					

== Final 6 ==
The third and final round of the season featured the acts who won the previous six duels in the finals. Based on their performances from the previous round, the audience voted for the act that they thought deserved to win the competition. The winner of the season was motorcyclist Kenny Thomas from team Hélène Ségara. He received the €100,000 prize. The runner-up was improvisational comedic singer Thomas Boissy from team Éric Antoine, and the act finishing in third place was pole acrobat Rémi Martin from team Marianne James.

Final Results

Placement	Participant	Act	Team
Winner	Kenny Thomas	Motorcyclist	Hélène Ségara
Runner-Up	Thomas Boissy	Comedy Singer	Éric Antoine
3rd Place	Rémi Martin	Pole Acrobat	Marianne James
Bottom 3	Dakota & Nadia	Dance Duo	Sugar Sammy
Bottom 3	Duo MainTenanT	Acrobatic Dance Duo	Hélène Ségara
Bottom 3	Les French Twins	Multimedia Magic Duo	Marianne James
