= La France a un incroyable talent series 4 =

La France a un incroyable talent
- Series 4
- Winner: Les Echo-liés
- Runner-up: Skorpion

Release
- Original network: M6

Series chronology
- Next → Series 5

Series 4 of La France a un incroyable talent aired from 24 November to 30 December 2009, and saw contestants compete by showcasing their talents before judges. The winner of the series was Les Echo-liés, a dancer.

== Background ==
Auditions for the fourth series started in late 2008 and successful contestants were notified in December 2008. Filming began on 15 January 2009.

The season was presented by Alex Goude and Sandrine Corman, replacing Alessandra Sublet, host of the previous three seasons. The jury consisted of producer Gilbert Rozon, who was the only judge to return from the previous season, and newcomers actress and director Valérie Stroh and comedian and humorist Smaïn, who replaced Sophie Edelstein and Patrick Dupond.

== Semi-final 1 ==
Order	Semi-Finalist	Act	Buzzes and Judges' Vote			Result (August 5)
Order	Semi-Finalist	Act	Rozon	Stroh	Smain	Result (August 5)
1	The Echos-Related	Dance Troupe				Advanced
2	Michael	Speed Painter				Eliminated
3	Isabelle	Dancer				Eliminated
4	Christina	Dog Act				Eliminated
5	Agnieszka	Singer				Advanced
6	Batuc'ados	Batucada Percussionists				Eliminated

Order	Semi-Finalist	Act	Buzzes and Judges' Vote			Result (August 5)
Order	Semi-Finalist	Act	Rozon	Stroh	Smain	Result (August 5)
1	So United Crew	Dance Troupe				Advanced
2	Mohammed Cheddadi	Magician				Wildcard
3	Melody & Marjolaine	Singing Duo				Eliminated
4	Simon	Motorcyclist				Eliminated
5	Franky Filing	Ventriloquist				Eliminated
6	Lea	Pianist / Singer				Advanced

Order	Semi-Finalist	Act	Buzzes and Judges' Vote			Result (August 5)
Order	Semi-Finalist	Act	Rozon	Stroh	Smain	Result (August 5)
1	Secrets Of Moonwalk	Dance Troupe				Advanced
2	Lola	Singer				Eliminated
3	Tao	Magician				Eliminated
4	Coy Balls & Bubbles	Jugglers				Eliminated
5	Sabrina	Aerial Contortionist				Advanced
6	Rachid	Danger Act				Eliminated

Order	Semi-Finalist	Act	Buzzes and Judges' Vote			Result (August 5)
Order	Semi-Finalist	Act	Rozon	Stroh	Smain	Result (August 5)
1	Skorpion	Dance Troupe				Advanced
2	Gwendal	Singer				Eliminated
3	Naomi & Fanny	Acrobats				Eliminated
4	Florian	Magician				Eliminated
5	Othentik 59	Dance Troupe				Eliminated
6	Celine	Singer / Songwriter				Advanced

The winner was announced 30 December 2009.

Final

Ordre	Finsished	Act	Performance
1	5 {10,98 %}	So United Crew	Dance Group
2	8 {5,37 %}	Mohammed Cheddadi	Magic
3	10 {3,10 %}	Sabrina	Contortionist
4	7 {5,78 %}	Agnieska	Singer
5	1 {21,16 %}	Les Echo-liés	Dancer
6	2 {17,03 %}	Skorpion	Dancer
7	6 {7,21 %}	Léa	Singer
8	3 {15,12 %}	Florian	Magic
9	4 {11,23 %}	Céline	Singer
10	9 {3,12 %}	Secrets of Moonwalk	Dancer
