= Agathe Lecaron =

French radio and television presenter (born 1974)

- Born: 8 March 1974 (age 51); Paris, France
- Occupation: Television presenter
- Years active: 2008–present
- Notable credit(s): On n'est pas que des cobayes Les Maternelles
- Television: AB3, RTL-TVI, TF1, M6, France 5

Agathe Lecaron (born 8 March 1974) is a French radio and television presenter. She lived and worked for 15 years in Belgium for the radio stations NRJ Belgique, Bel RTL and RTL2 or for television channels like AB3, RTL-TVI, TF1, M6 or France 5.

== Life and career ==
Agathe Lecaron was born in Paris. She graduated with a master's degree in foreign languages at La Sorbonne. She then left for Belgium where lived her best friend and joined the NRJ Group.

She was engaged in 1998 at NRJ Belgique, and was then contacted at the creation of the Belgian home shopping channel LTA. She was then engaged at AB3 to present the television program Permis de séduire. She shifted to a concurrent channel, RTL-TVI, the most watched private Belgian channel. She presented a number of programs including 1000 secondes, dedicated to cooking, and All Access, one of the entertainment programs of the channel. At the RTL Group, she presented the program Lifestyle on Plug RTL. She also presented the radio program Duel on Bel RTL and the television program Le Mot gagnant on RTL-TVI.

She was a presenter on the radio station RTL2 where she hosted the program Le Grand Morning from Monday to Friday with Christophe Nicolas. She announced her departure on 10 July 2013 and was replaced by Louise Ekland. She joined the channel TMC to present a new version of the program Incroyable mais vrai alternating with Sandra Lou broadcast on TF1 from 2002 to 2007. Soon after, Agathe Lecaron was chosen to co-host with Jean-Pierre Foucault the return on TF1 of the program Sacrée Soirée.

During summer 2010, she should have arrived on M6 to present the reality summer event Trompe-moi si tu peux, first broadcast since middle of July on the second part of Thursday evening. But this program was suspended two days before the broadcast for the respect of a contestant of the program who committed suicide right after. In December 2010, she presented Le Grand Bêtisier with Alex Goude on M6. The program was allowed to have a prime time on 19 December and then every day during two weeks replacing 100 % Mag. Agathe Lecaron replaced Sandrine Corman on this program. In 2011, she also replaced Sandrine Corman with Stéphane Rotenberg for the second season of the French version of Top Chef on M6, also broadcast on RTL-TVI.

On 4 July 2011, she announced leaving M6 to join France 5. She presented since October 2011 on that channel the program On n'est pas que des cobayes on Friday during the first part of the evening. Pregnant of her first child, she suspended her participation at the end of the year 2013. In May 2016, she was announced to present the program Les Maternelles still on France 5.

== Personal life ==
Agathe Lecaron married François Pellissier in 2014 and has two sons named Gaspard and Félix, born in 2014 and 2016.

== Television programs ==
- 1000 secondes with chef Yves Mattagne on RTL-TVI
- Life Style on Plug RTL, weekly program about the news of the latest tendencies
- Ça vous fait rire ? with Maria Del Rio on RTL-TVI
- Incroyable mais vrai on TF1
- Top Chef (season 2) with Stéphane Rotenberg on M6 and RTL-TVI
- On n'est pas que des cobayes on France 5
- La Maison des Maternelles on France 5
