= La France a un incroyable talent series 5 =

La France a un incroyable talent
- Series 5
- Winner: Axel et Alizée
- Runner-up: Iya

Release
- Original network: M6

Season chronology
- ← Previous; Series 4 Next → Season 21

The fifth season of La France a un incroyable talent, the French adaptation of the Got Talent franchise, was broadcast on M6 from November 3 to December 22, 2010. The series followed the traditional format of the franchise, seeking out the most unique and impressive talents across France, whether singers, dancers, magicians, comedians, or novelty acts. After weeks of competition, the season concluded with the victory of Axel Sampino and Alizée Bois, a young dance duo who captured the public’s heart with their emotive performances and exceptional chemistry on stage. The grand prize for the season was a cheque for €100,000 and the chance to perform at the prestigious Just for Laughs Festival in Montreal, offering winners a springboard for international exposure and professional growth. The season was made up of eight episodes, including auditions, three semi-finals, and a live final, with the format offering a blend of both jury and public influence over the outcome.

== Presenters & Judges ==
Judges and Hosts for La France a un Incroyable Talent Series 5

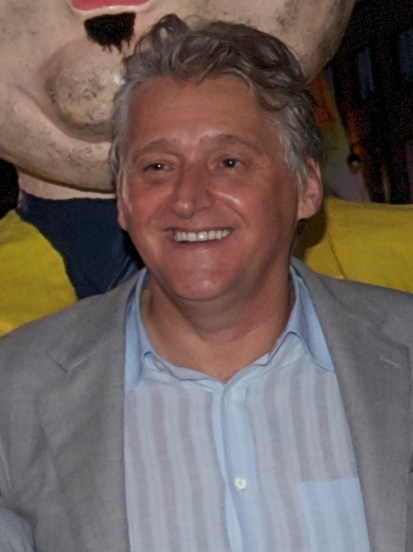
Gilbert Rozon (Judge)

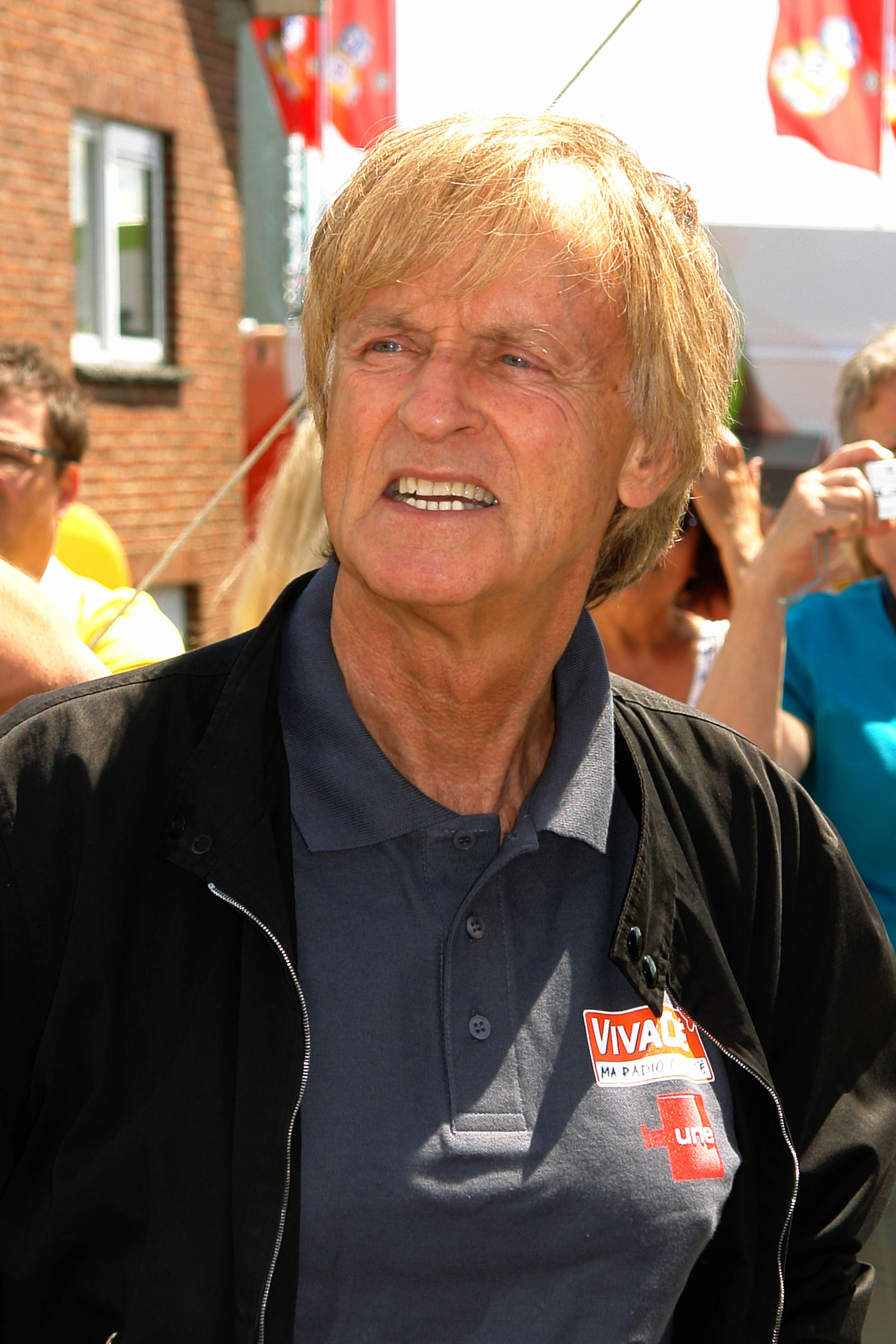
Dave (Judge)

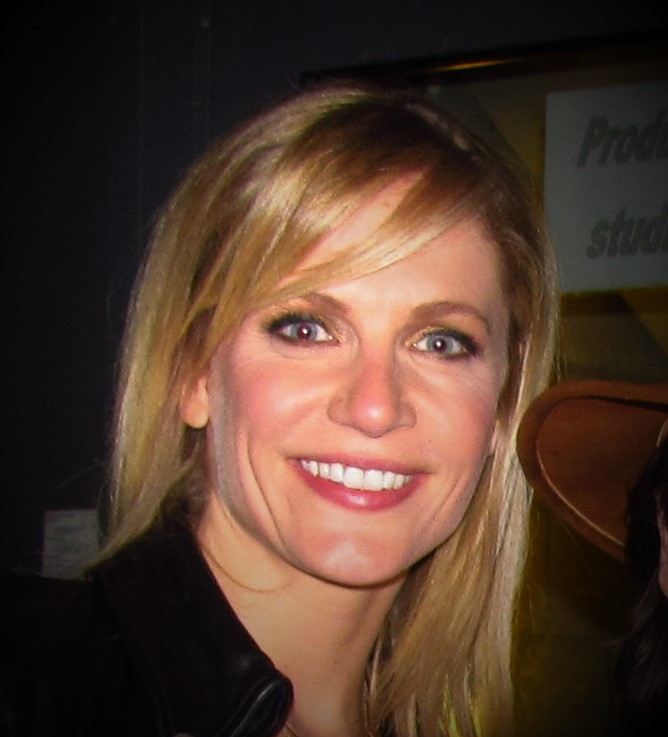
Sandrine Corman (Host)

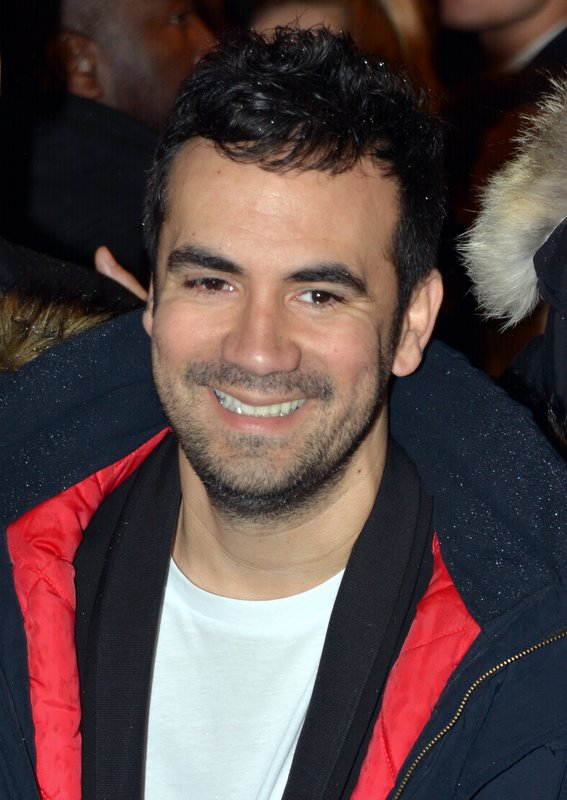
Alex Goude (Host)

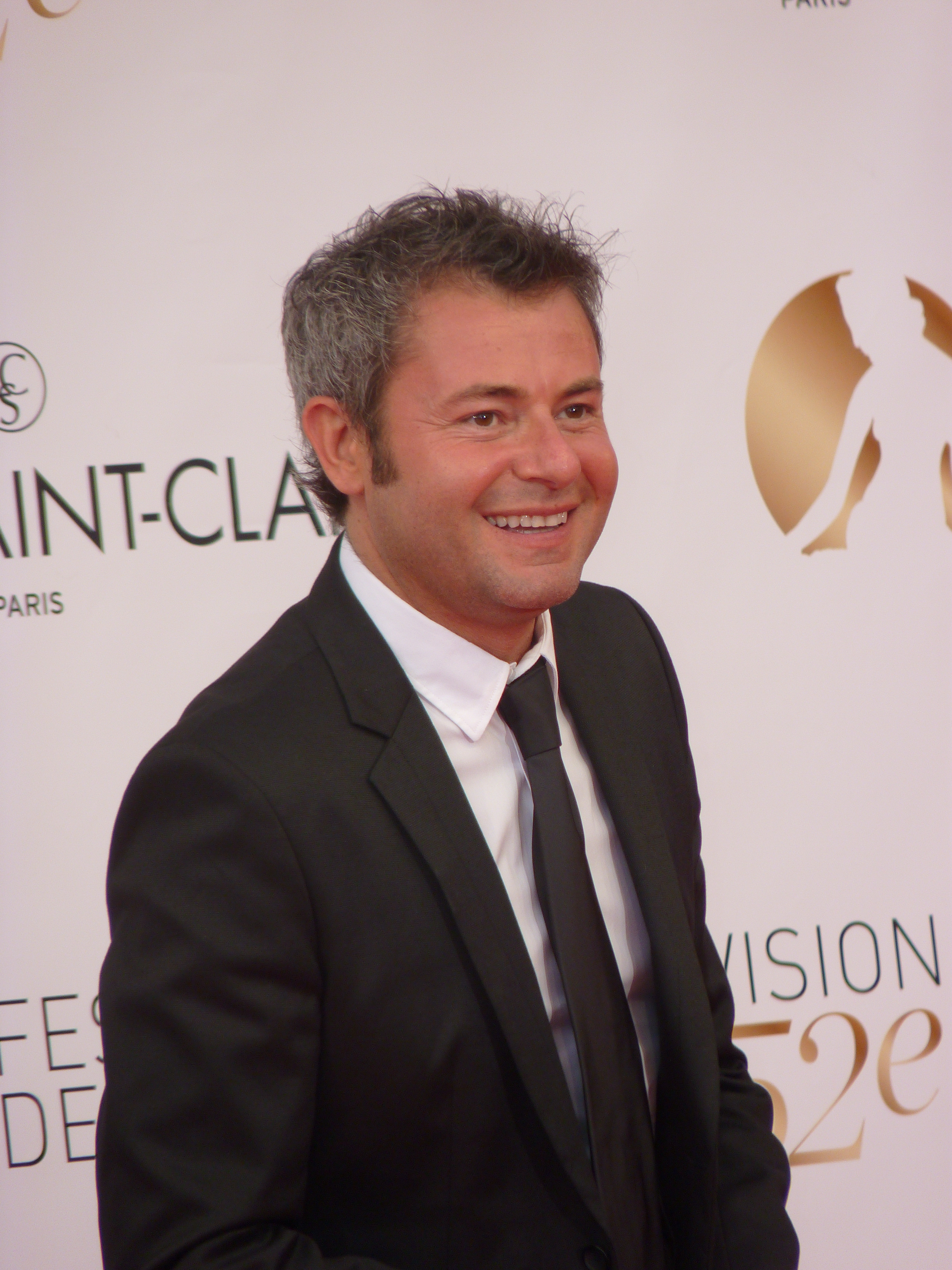
Jérôme Anthony (Ca continue)

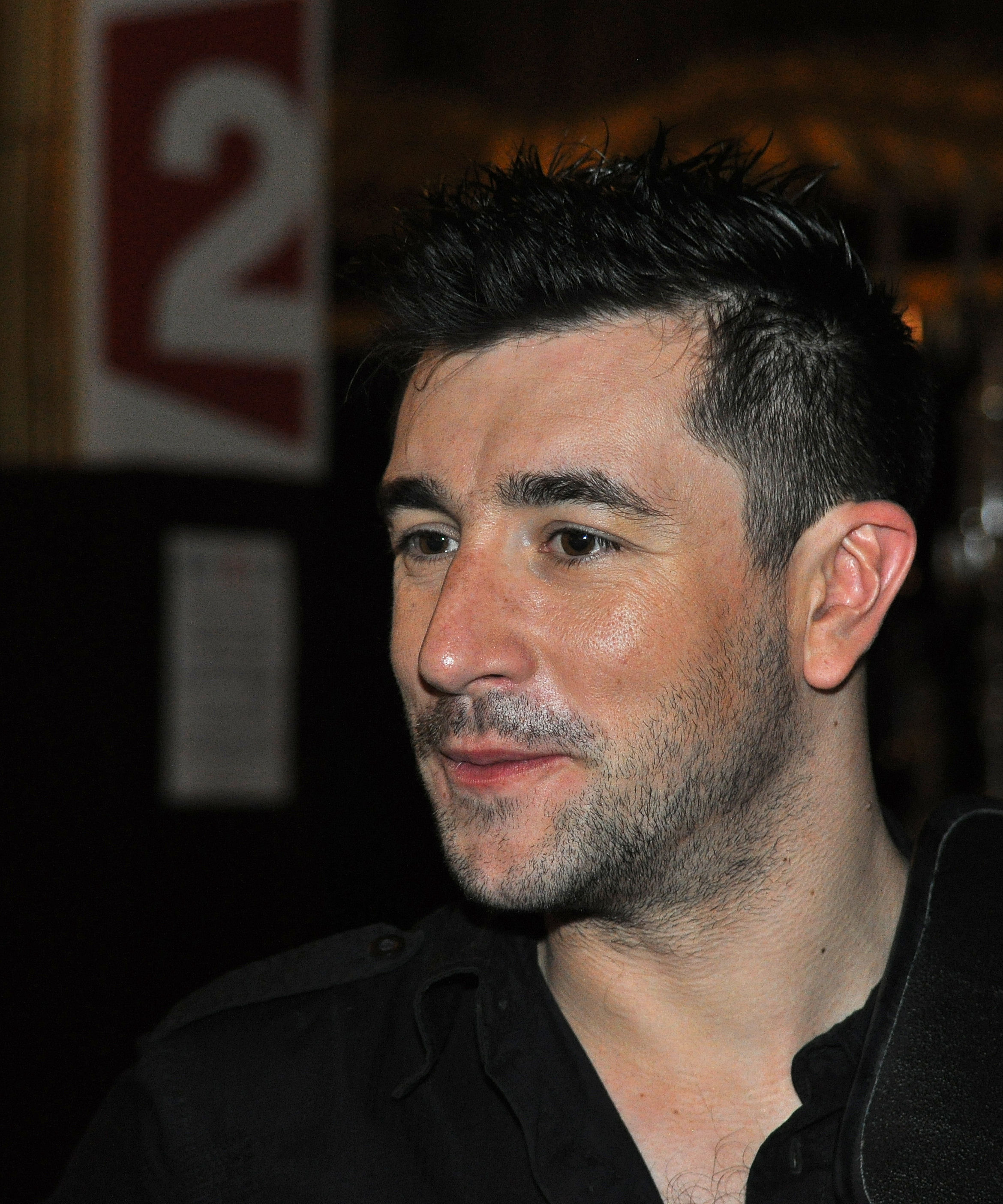
Anthony Joubert (Ca continue)

The main show was hosted once again by Alex Goude and Sandrine Corman, who returned following their previous season’s successful run as presenters. Their chemistry and energy contributed to the show's dynamic pacing and light-hearted tone between acts.

The late-night spin-off, La France a un incroyable talent, ça continue, continued to air after each main episode. It was presented by Jérôme Anthony, accompanied by Anthony Joubert, a former finalist from the 2008 season. The spin-off show provided behind-the-scenes content, exclusive interviews, and extended coverage of the acts and judges’ reactions, giving fans a deeper look into the competition and its contestants.

The judging panel remained consistent from the previous season, featuring a trio of well-established personalities. Gilbert Rozon, a producer and founder of the Just for Laughs Festival, served as the veteran judge, having been on the panel since the show's inception. Joining him were Sophie Edelstein, the artistic director of Cirque Pinder, and Dave, a singer and entertainer with decades of experience in the French music industry. The combination of these three judges brought a balanced dynamic to the panel. Rozon often served as the no-nonsense critic, Edelstein emphasized performance artistry, and Dave offered both technical insight and warmth. All three were equipped with buzzers and had the power to stop an act mid-performance if all three pressed in unison.

== Auditions ==
The auditions took place over four days, from September 15 to 18, 2010, at the Palais des Arts et des Congrès in Issy-les-Moulineaux, a suburb of Paris. Around 150 acts were invited to showcase their talents in front of the judging panel and a live audience. Each act was given a brief time slot to perform, after which the judges would individually vote “yes” or “no” based on what they had just seen. Acts required at least two "yes" votes to progress to the next round.

In addition to voting, each judge had access to a buzzer, which could be pressed at any moment during a performance. If all three judges buzzed an act, it would be immediately stopped and rejected on the spot—adding an extra layer of pressure for the performers. After the auditions concluded, the judges selected 30 acts from the successful pool to move on to the semi-final stage.

== Semi-Finals ==
The semi-finals were broadcast live over three weeks, from December 1 to December 15, 2010, with ten acts competing in each of the three shows. These ten acts were divided into two groups of five. Within each group, the public voted for one act to advance to the final. Then, the judges selected an additional finalist from the remaining acts, specifically from those who finished second or third in the public vote—though the precise ranking of those runners-up was not always disclosed.

The judges continued to have access to their buzzers during the semi-finals, and a fully buzzed-out act would be stopped in real time, even during the live broadcasts. This stage of the competition was critical, as it brought the mix of jury critique and public opinion into sharper focus. At the end of the semi-finals, 12 acts had secured their places in the grand final—six chosen by the public and six selected by the judges.

=== Semi-final summary ===
Buzzed out | Judges' vote | Advanced - Public Vote
Advanced - Judges' Vote | Eliminated - Judges' Vote | Eliminated

==== Semi-final 1 (December 1, 2010) ====
Semi-Finalist	Order	Buzzes and Judges' Votes			Result
Semi-Finalist	Order	Rozon	Edelstein	Dave	Result
Axel & Alizee	1				Advanced (Won Public Vote)
Iya	2				Advanced (Won Judges' Vote)
Grace Rose	3				Eliminated
JR Gunter Sacckman	4				Eliminated (Lost Judges' Vote)
Julia Webb	5				Eliminated
Second Group
Haspop	6				Advanced (Won Judges' Vote)
Jovany	7				Eliminated
Duo Now	8				Advanced (Won Public Vote)
Lil'Unit	9				Eliminated (Lost Judges' Vote)
Jasmine Vegas	10				Eliminated

==== Semi-final 2 (December 8, 2010) ====
Semi-Finalist	Order	Buzzes and Judges' Votes			Result
Semi-Finalist	Order	Rozon	Edelstein	Dave	Result
Sacha Frog	1				Advanced (Won Judges' Vote)
Erick Bamy	2				Advanced (Won Public Vote)
Didier	3				Eliminated
Alch3my	4				Eliminated
Pop'n'brothers	5				Eliminated (Lost Judges' Vote)
Second Group
Joe	6				Eliminated (Lost Judges' Vote)
Odette	7				Advanced (Won Public Vote)
Jean-François Martel	8				Advanced (Won Judges' Vote)
Anthony	9				Eliminated
Herve	10				Eliminated

==== Semi-final 3 (December 15, 2010) ====
Semi-Finalist	Order	Buzzes and Judges' Votes			Result
Semi-Finalist	Order	Rozon	Edelstein	Dave	Result
Natalia	1				Advanced (Won Judges' Vote)
Alliance New Gospel	2				Eliminated (Lost Judges' Vote)
Kalidor III	3				Eliminated
Ebony Group	4				Eliminated
Origins	5				Advanced (Won Public Vote)
Second Group
Yaman	6				Advanced (Won Public Vote)
Cormier Family	7				Eliminated
Laure	8				Advanced (Won Judges' Vote)
Robolounge	9				Eliminated
Rockbox	10				Eliminated (Lost Judges' Vote)

== Grand Final ==
The final was broadcast live on December 22, 2010. In a departure from earlier stages, the public held full control over the outcome. The judges no longer had any say in who would win. All 12 finalists performed one last time, showcasing their talents in a bid to secure public support. After the votes were tallied, dancers Axel Sampino and Alizée Bois were crowned the winners of Season 5. Their victory was widely praised, as the duo’s routines combined technical prowess with emotional storytelling, making them stand out consistently throughout the competition. Their win continued the trend of dance acts performing strongly in La France a un incroyable talent, following in the footsteps of earlier winners who brought fresh artistry and innovation to the stage.

=== Final Summary ===
Winner | Runner-up

Finalist	Order	Result	Voting Percentage
Axel et Alizée	1	1st	22.00%
Erick Bamy	2	4th	16.50%
Yaman	3	3rd	17.00%
Sacha la Grenouille	4	8th	3.50%
Odette	5	5th	7.00%
Haspop	6	7th	4.00%
Natalia	7	11th	0.35%
Laure	8	10th	1.75%
Duo MainTenanT	9	6th	5.50%
Iya	10	2nd	20.00%
Jean-François Martel	11	12th	0.15%
Origins	12	9th	2.25%
