= Sam Wills =

New Zealand prop comic, busker, clown, and mime (born 1978)

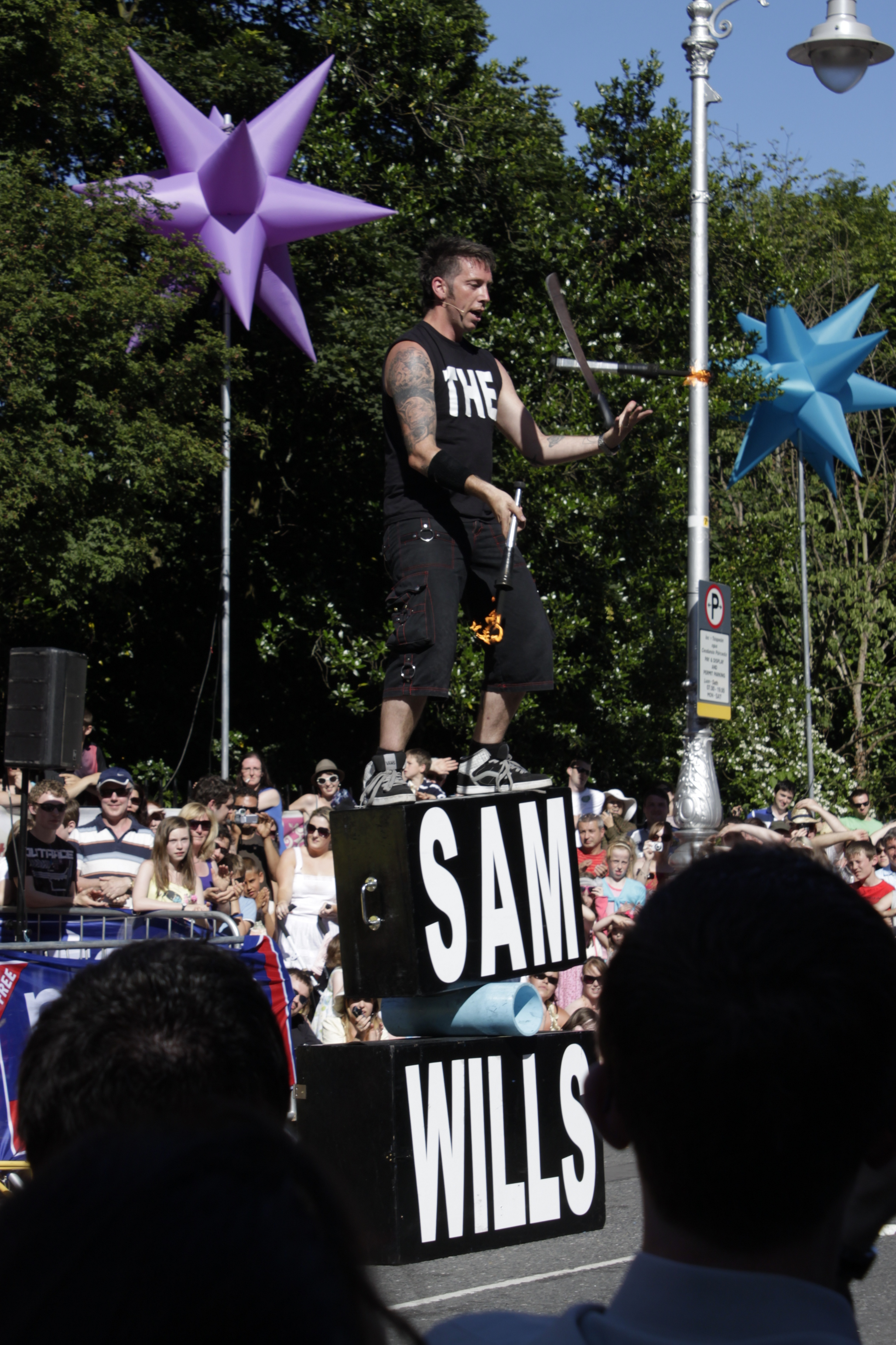
- Wills performing in Dublin, Ireland, in 2010
- Born: 28 August 1978 (age 48); Timaru, New Zealand
- Other names: Tape Face, The Boy With Tape On His Face, Sam Wills
- Education: Christchurch Polytechnic Institute of Technology’s Circus School, earned a Diploma in New Circus, majoring in Juggling and Acrobatics.
- Notable work: Most viewed comedian on YouTube, his performances for America’s Got Talent being viewed over 220 million times worldwide.
- Spouse: Felicity Redman (m. 2009–2017)
- Children: 1 son

Comedy career
- Years active: 1991–present
- Medium: Laughter, surprise
- Genres: prop-comic, comedian
- Website: tapeface.tv

Sam Wills (born 28 August 1978) is a New Zealand prop comic, busker, clown, and mime artist residing in Las Vegas, Nevada, U.S. He performs under the name The Boy With Tape On His Face and, more recently, as Tape Face. He was also half of the two-person act Spitroast and sometimes performed under his own name, Sam Wills. He has been featured in the New Zealand International Comedy Festival, the World Buskers Festival, and was a finalist on the eleventh season of America's Got Talent.

== Biography ==
Wills began his performing career in Timaru at the age of thirteen while he trained as a clown. He uses a diverse range of performance styles and skills. He holds a diploma in New Circus from Christchurch Polytechnic Institute of Technology's Circus School where he has taught juggling for two years. His interest in the phenomenon of traditional circus freak shows and influences such as the Jim Rose Circus and the Tokyo Shock Boys led to experiments with shock comedy, earning him his first Pulp Comedy appearance, the Best New Face award for the 2001 season, and he was called ‘Prince of Cringe’ from Truth and TV Extra magazine.

Until 2001, Wills was active in the Christchurch entertainment scene, appearing at balls, private functions and corporate events; running weekly comedy nights and appearing on local television. In 2002, he moved to Auckland to become a resident comedian at the casino in SkyCity Auckland, where he had a weekly show, the NCB Comedy Hour, blending circus and vaudeville styles. In 2008, Wills took his show The Boy With Tape On His Face to the Melbourne Comedy Festival, where it received critical acclaim. After Melbourne and later in 2008, he moved to London, appearing as a modern mime and wearing the traditional striped shirt.

Wills met his future wife, English burlesque performer Felicity Redman (also known as Lili La Scala), in 2007. They had a "symbolic wedding" on 9 January 2009, in Christchurch as a start to that year's World Buskers Festival in the same spot on the banks of the Avon River where they got engaged a year earlier. This was followed by a legal wedding later that year in England. Their son was born in January 2013.

Wills rarely gives interviews to maintain the impression of not speaking, which was created by taping his mouth for performances. His media strategy is modelled on that of Kate Moss, of whom he has said "She doesn't do any public speaking at all. That makes her even cooler. She just does her job. That is the approach we are taking with this. We want the show to just sell itself."

== Notable performances ==
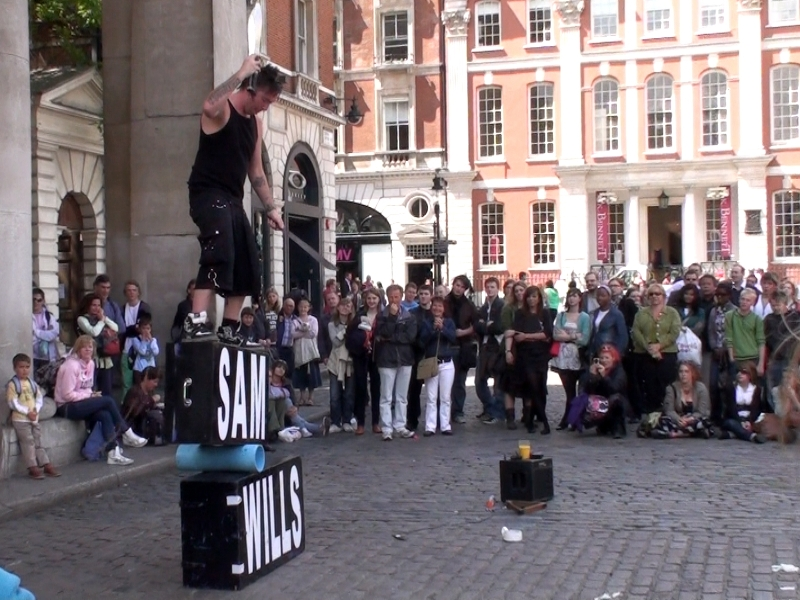
Wills performing in Covent Garden, London (May 2009)

Wills performed as the MC of the Late Club at the Auckland Festival in 2005 (AK05) and for First Night at the Aotea Centre. He also performed at the World Buskers' Festival in 2004, 2005 and 2008. He was a regular performer on Pulp Comedy, during its three seasons on TV2. He performed on the red carpet for the World Premier of The Lord of the Rings: The Return of the King in Wellington. He was the support act for David Strassman's 2003 tour of New Zealand. He has also performed at private functions for the former New Zealand Prime Minister Helen Clark and the King of Tonga George Tupou V. In the UK, he made an ITV appearance on Comedy Rocks hosted by Jason Manford (2011), and also appeared at the first BBC Comedy Prom at London's Royal Albert Hall on 13 August 2011 (broadcast on BBC 2 on 27 August 2011). On 5 December 2011 he performed at the 83rd annual Royal Variety Performance, alongside Tim Minchin and others.

In the Season 11 premiere of America's Got Talent (AGT) on 31 May 2016, shortening his stage name to Tape Face, Wills auditioned and got through to the next round. In Week 8 of AGT, during the Judges' cuts round, Wills successfully auditioned through to the live shows. In Week 1 of the AGT quarterfinals, he advanced to the semifinals. He advanced to the finals on 31 August 2016 by getting the most audience votes in the Dunkin' save, but was later eliminated on 14 September when he did not reach a top five spot. Maria Karvouni of Forbes magazine wrote that Tape Face revives silent film acting, using his facial expressions and body movements to captivate his audience: "His simplicity creates a complexity which results in a lot of laughter." He appeared in a show with America's Got Talent Season 11 winner Grace VanderWaal and runner-up The Clairvoyants in a three-night concert series at Planet Hollywood Resort & Casino in Las Vegas, Nevada, in October 2016. He also appeared in 2019 on Week 4 of America's Got Talent: Champions, on Monday, 28 January, where he placed in the top 4 of that night's acts.

Wills made an appearance in YouTube Rewind 2016.

In 2018 Wills began a residency in Harrah's casino in Las Vegas. In 2023 it moved to the MGM Grand. When he's on tour, his doppelganger T2 performs in his place at the Vegas theater, which is called the House of Tape.

In 2020, Wills appeared on the 15th season of La France a un incroyable talent, the "Battle of the Judges." He was a member of team Sugar Sammy. In the first round of the competition, Tape Face competed in a duel against pole acrobat Rémi Martin from team Marianne James. The audience and judges Éric Antoine and Hélène Ségara all voted for Rémi Martin to move on to the next round, eliminating Wills from the competition.

He is slated to appear in the fifth season of Canada's Got Talent in 2025.

== Awards ==
- In 2001, Wills received Pulp Comedy's Best New Face Award.
- In 2002, he received the Best Marketing award from the New Zealand International Comedy Festival.
- In 2005, he received New Zealand's highest comedy honours, the Billy T Award for his show Dance Monkey Dance: The Evolution of Sam Wills and the "Best Show" award from the New Zealand Comedy Guild.
- In 2006, he received the "Best Show" and "Best Show Concept" awards from the New Zealand Comedy Guild.
- In 2007, he received the "Best Show" and "Best Show Concept" awards from the New Zealand Comedy Guild as well as the "Best Poster" and "Best Show Auckland" awards at the New Zealand International Comedy Festival.
- In 2008, he received the "Peoples Choice" award at the World Buskers Festival and the Groggy Squirrel Readers Award at the Melbourne Comedy Festival. He was also nominated for the 'Best Newcomer' at the Melbourne Comedy Festival.
- In 2011, he won best breakthrough act at chortle live comedy awards 2011 as 'The Boy With Tape On His Face'
- In 2012, he was nominated for the prestigious Fred Award in the New Zealand International Comedy Festival as 'The Boy With Tape On His Face'.
- In 2014, he was nominated for the Barry Award.
- In 2016, he was presented with the International Achievement Award from the Variety Artists Club of New Zealand.
