= Rozon =

Rozon is a surname. Notable people with the surname include:

- Gilbert Rozon (born 1954), Canadian businessman
- James Rozon (born 1963), Canadian gymnast
- Tim Rozon (born 1976), Canadian actor
