= Lego Masters (French TV series) =

2020 French reality television show

- Directed by: Sébastien Pestel
- Presented by: Éric Antoine
- Judges: Georg Schmitt; Fuchsia d'Enfer (5-); Former judges; Paulina Aubey (1-3); Aveline Stokart (4)
- Country of origin: France
- Original language: French
- No. of seasons: 5
- No. of episodes: 20

Production
- Running time: 125 minutes
- Production company: Endemol France

Original release
- Network: M6
- Release: 23 December 2020 – present

Lego Masters is a French reality television show based on the international franchise of the same name that debuted on M6 on 23 December 2020. It is hosted by magician Éric Antoine and is judged by Georg Schmitt and Fuchsia d'Enfer (since season 5). Former judges were Paulina Aubey (season 1-3) and Aveline Stokart (season 4).

== Format ==
Eight teams of two complete two challenges every week, with the judges deciding who gets eliminated. Lego Masters is presented by Éric Antoine, known for being a judge on La France a un incroyable talent. The show's two judges are Paulina Aubey, a visual artist, and Georg Schmitt, France's only Lego Certified Professional. The team that wins the competition gets €20,000 and the work that they made in the final will go on display at the Necker–Enfants Malades Hospital in Paris. The show has been likened to other reality TV shows such as Top Chef and Koh-Lanta.

== Production ==
The series is produced by Endemol France (formerly Endemol Shine France), a subsidiary of Banijay. The show was shot in July 2020 in a studio in Le Pré-Saint-Gervais. No less than 2.5 million bricks were used in the show which were purchased by Endemol Shine and were not provided free of charge. Antoine said in an interview that he had "called everyone at M6 to tell them that I was the man for the job" and that he was a "big fan of construction games". The show was first announced on 1 December 2020 and aired on M6 from 23 December 2020 to 12 January 2021. The series was also shown in Belgium on RTL-TVI from 26 December 2020 to 16 January 2021.

In the second episode the world record for the greatest weight supported by a brick bridge was surpassed by Alban and Xavier and Marguerite and Renaud. Both teams' bridges managed to hold 500 kg, beating the record of 453 kg previously set in the American version of the show. The winners of the first series were David and Sébastien who in the final created a Lego totem pole that represented them. Sébastien is a graphic designer and creator of the magazine Brique Mag who met David when he interviewed him about his Lego prosthetic arm. A second series was confirmed in March 2021.

== Series details ==
=== Series 1 ===
Lego Masters series 1 - Teams
Team	Ages	Profession	Status
David & Sébastien	21 & 46	Student & graphic designer	Winners
Alban & Xavier	42 & 41	Graphic designer & entrepreneur	Runners-up
Guillaume & Loïc	23 & 20	Engineer student & product design student	Eliminated in episode 5
Marguerite & Renaud	26 & 34	Plastic artists	Eliminated in episode 4
Maximilien & Thibault	26 & 27	Journalist & law student	Eliminated in episode 3
Jean-Philippe & Yann	52 & 22	IT technician & computer science student	Eliminated in episode 3
Christelle & Johan	47 & 34	Banker & technical salesperson	Eliminated in episode 2
Ariana & Aurélien	31 & 32	Librarian & camera operator	Eliminated in episode 1

Lego Masters series 1 - Episodes
Episode	Title	Date
1	"Émission 1"	23 December 2020
For the first challenge the teams build their own dream amusement park. For the second challenge the teams are paired up, with one team building a superhero creation and the other team building a supervillain creation.
2	"Émission 2"	29 December 2020
The teams build a model that is then destroyed either by an explosion, a baseball bat or by being slammed into a wall on a sled. For the next challenge the teams find out which of their bridges can hold the most weight.
3	"Émission 3"	5 January 2021
The teams are given ten hours to create a building, they are then given an additional three hours to add a monster to their builds. For the second challenge the teams create the other half of everyday objects.
4	"Émission 4"	12 January 2021
The four remaining teams are each given a period of history that they must recreate in Lego form. For the grand finale the teams have 24 hours to build whatever they want.

==== Lego Masters: Extra Brique ====
Extra episodes were released for every episode in the series. The episodes included unseen footage, behind the scenes and interviews.

=== Series 2 ===
Lego Masters series 2 - Teams
Team	Ages	Profession	Status
Eric & Alex	29 & 24	Civil engineer & carpenter	1st Place
Marin & Alexandre	27 & 28	Logistics seller & graphic designer	Runners-up
Marine & Benjamin	32 & 30	Sales consultant & school teacher	Eliminated in episode 5
Etienne & Christine	38 & 39	Gaming company manager & product developer	Eliminated in episode 4
Aurelien & Vincent	32 & 39	Chef & artist	Eliminated in episode 3
Loïc & Sandor	23 & 23	IT developer & entrepreneur	Eliminated in episode 3
Céline & Stéphane	38 & 40	Training officer & head teacher	Eliminated in episode 2
Laure & Hervé	31 & 32	Graphic designer & EDF service trainer	Eliminated in episode 1

Lego Masters series 2 - Episodes
Episode	Title	Date
1	"Émission 1"	28 December 2021
For the first challenge the teams build an adventure scene to stop a train. For the second challenge the teams' builds are suspended off a wire without a table to support them.
2	"Émission 2"	29 December 2021
The teams build a scene consisting of a hero walking away from an explosion. For the next challenge the teams build a tower that must be at least 1.2m tall and withstand multiple levels of shaking.
3	"Émission 3"	4 January 2022
The teams create a build based on a story and are then given a villain which they have to add to their builds. For the second challenge the teams create a build that is reflected on both halves of a Lego baseplate.
4	"Émission 4"	11 January 2022
The four remaining teams are tasked with constructing a build that is to be placed on a giant tree. For the grand finale the teams have 24 hours to build whatever they want.

== Reception ==
Lego Masters received positive reviews with over 4 million people watching the first episode. James Townley, Global Head of Creative Networks at Endemol Shine Group said "feel-good formats with plenty of optimism that attract a wide family audience are ideal for broadcasters around the world right now and it's brilliant to see a French version commissioned by M6," though some criticised the judges and the fact that fan favourites Guillaume & Loïc did not win the first series.

=== Viewership ===
==== Series 1 ====
Viewership and ratings per episode of Lego Masters
No.	Title	Air date	Viewers (millions)	Ref.
1	"Émission 1"	23 December 2020	4.06	
2	"Émission 2"	29 December 2020	3.73	
3	"Émission 3"	5 January 2021	2.45	
4	"Émission 4"	12 January 2021	2.73	
