= Stéphane Rotenberg =

French journalist and television presenter

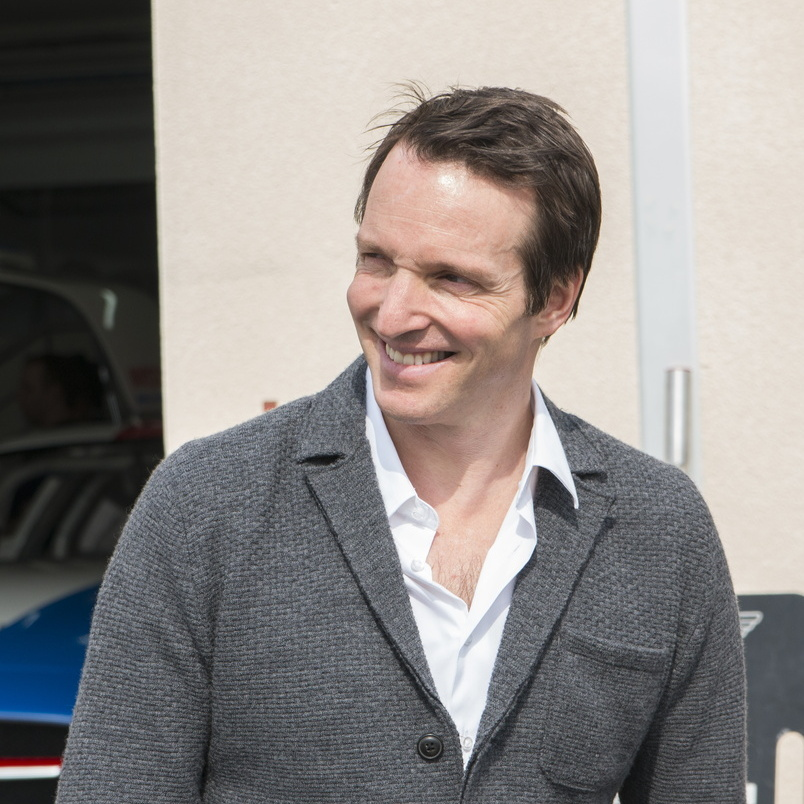
- Born: 21 September 1967 (age 58); Lens, Pas-de-Calais, France
- Occupations: Journalist, television presenter
- Years active: 1991–present
- Television: Bachelor, le gentleman célibataire; Pékin Express; Top Chef; Ice Road Truckers

Stéphane Rotenberg (born 21 September 1967) is a French journalist and television presenter.

== Background and early life ==
Stéphane Rotenberg's grandparents are from Polish families who settled in the Nord-Pas de Calais Mining Basin of Lens. His paternal grandparents, Polish Jews, fled oppression, while his maternal grandparents, Polish Catholics, came to France looking for work. One of his grandfathers is a miner, the other is a furniture manufacturer.

Stéphane Rotenberg was born in Lens, but when he was two and a half years old, his parents left Pas-de-Calais to find work in Paris.

In 1985, he ceased studying for the baccalauréat, France's secondary schooling qualification, three months before the exams, preferring to immediately start a career as a journalist. He then undertook training at a radio school, which allowed him to access media internships.

== Career ==
From 1991 to 1997, he worked in specialized magazines such as Sport Auto or L'Auto-Journal. He also wrote several articles for the general press in VSD, Vogue Hommes and Liberation.

During the 2000s, he hosted various corporate presentations of vehicles and industry promotions for the Citroën group, intended for car salespeople.

=== Journalism ===
Before becoming a television presenter, Rotenberg was a print journalist. From 1991 to 1997, he worked for speciality magazines such as Sport Auto and Auto Journal. He also wrote some articles for the general press like VSD, Vogue and Libération. From 1995 to 1997, he was a reporter and then associate editor of Turbo on channel M6.

In 1998, he became an editorial director of magazine programming for France 2. In 1999, he was an assistant director of magazine and documentary programs at the channel, where he helped initiate programs such as Comme au cinéma, Union libre (with Christine Bravo), C'est au programme and Tout le monde en parle.

=== Television presenting ===
In 2000, the director of programming and production of channel AB Moteurs selected Rotenberg to host its flagship magazine program V6, a show dedicated to motor vehicles. The same year, Rotenberg joined M6, hosting Normal / Paranormal. In 2001, he hosted Comme à la télé, a celebrity talk show on Match TV.

In 2003, he hosted Bachelor, le gentleman célibataire (the French version of The Bachelor) on M6. After the success of the first season, he hosted the following seasons from 2004 to 2005. In 2003, he hosted Stars intimes on M6, in which he talked about the personal life of celebrities.

Since 2006, he has presented a number of programs on M6 such as Magiciens, leurs plus grands secrets, L'Inventeur de l'année and Pékin Express (the French version of Peking Express), all broadcast in 2007. From January to April 2008, he presented the third season of Pékin Express, the fourth season from April to July 2009, the fifth season in April 2010, the sixth season in November 2010, and the seventh season in April 2011.

In January 2009, he presented Ice Road Truckers on channel W9. After the first season, he presented the second season. In 2009, he co-hosted Total Wipeout with Alex Goude and Sandrine Corman on M6. In February 2010, he presented with Sandrine Corman the first season of France's Top Chef. He was the show's sole presenter in its second season in January 2011, the third season in January 2012, and finally the fourth season in February 2013.

In April 2012, Rotenberg hosted the eighth season of Pékin Express, le passager mystère on M6. During shooting on location in the Philippines, he was involved in an accident while riding a motorcycle with a side-car. The vehicle swerved off-course and was hit head-on by an oncoming car. Neither Rotenburg nor the other cycle occupant, a local man and owner of the vehicle, were seriously injured, despite the serious collision. Rotenberg was able to continue hosting duties after treatment. The vehicle was destroyed in the incident. In April 2013, he hosted the ninth season of Pékin Express, le coffre maudit.
