= Jean-Baptiste Guégan =

French singer

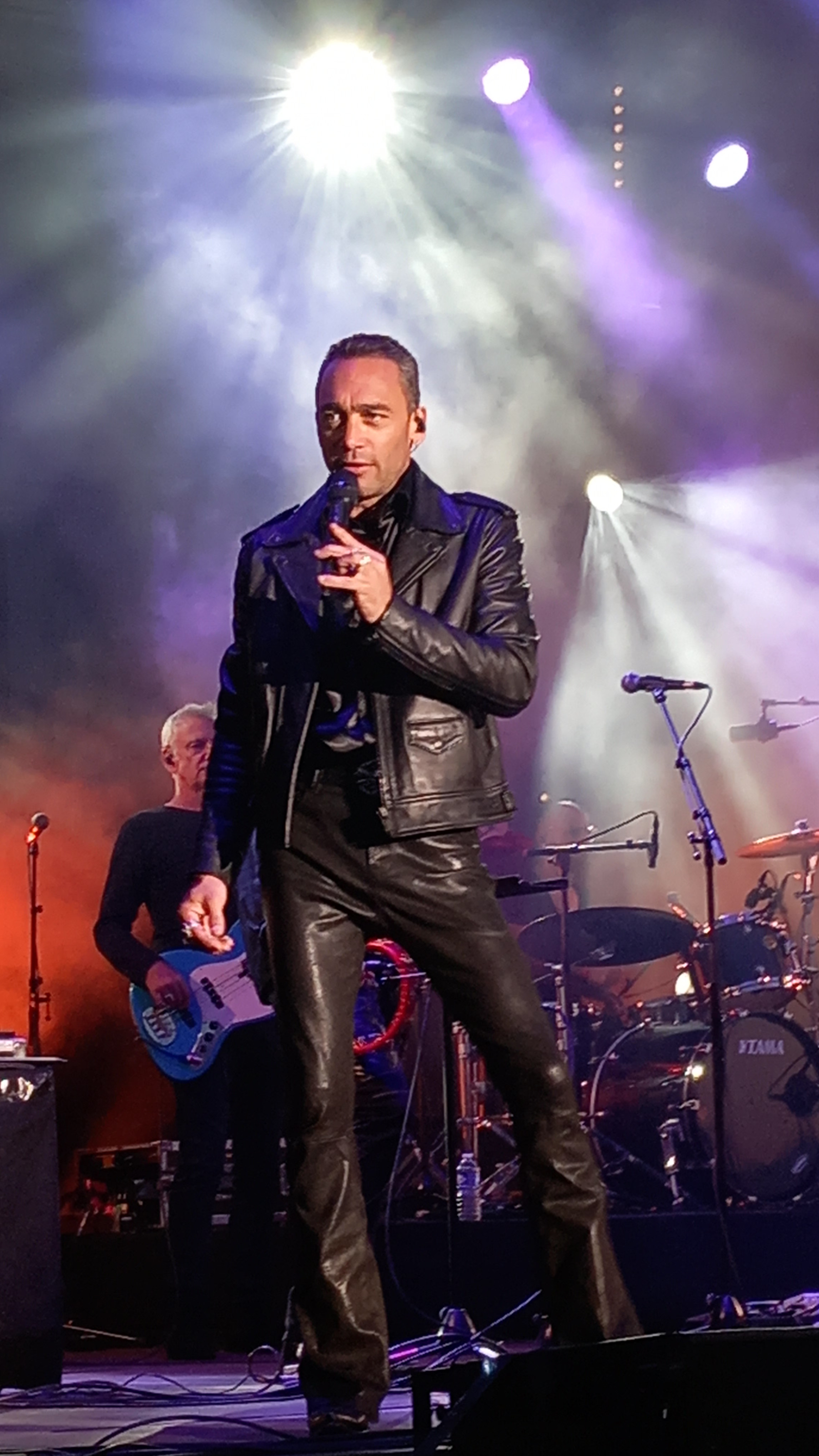
- Jean-Baptiste Guégan, @ Irréductible Festival 2024 (Fr-Quimper).

Background information
- Birth name: Jean-Baptiste Guégan
- Also known as: Johnny Junior, La Voix de Johnny
- Born: 14 May 1983; Trégueux (Brittanny, France)
- Origin: Lannion (Brittanny, France)
- Genres: Rock and roll; pop
- Occupation: Singer
- Instrument: Voice
- Years active: 2018–present
- Labels: Smart
- Spouses: Nadège (m. 2000–2018) (3 ch.: Diego (2013), Ewan & Luna (2017)) Virginie Bustin (m. 2022)
- Website: jbguegan.fr

Jean-Baptiste Guégan (born c. 1983 in Brittany, France) is a French singer known for his interpretations of Johnny Hallyday songs popularly known as "la voix de Johnny" (Johnny's voice). He was a fan of Hallyday since he was 9 years old when he saw Hallyday perform live in Bercy in 1992. He took part in 2018 in the French Got Talent series La France a un incroyable talent interpreting Hallyday songs and winning the title.

He released his debut album Puisque c'est écrit on 30 August 2019. Recorded in Nashville, it contained songs written by Michel Mallory, a major songwriter for Hallyday. The album topped the SNEP French Albums Chart in its first week of release also topping the Ultratop Belgian Wallon (French) Albums Chart and making it number 7 on the Hitparade Swiss Albums Chart. It was certified gold. He also engaged on a tour of 28 dates including many Zénith venues.

== Discography ==
=== Albums ===
| Title | Year | Peak positions | | | | Title | Units | Certifications |
| Title | Year | FRA | BEL (Fl) | BEL (Wa) | SWI | Title | Units | Certifications |
|---|---|---|---|---|---|---|---|---|
| Puisque c'est écrit | 2019 | 1 | 184 | 1 | 7 | No. / Title / Length; 1. / "Retourner là-bas" / 3:41; 2. / "Puisque c'est écrit" / 4:11; 3. / "Coupable" / 3:18; 4. / "Merci" / 3:59; 5. / "La cité des bleuets" / 3:02; 6. / "Par amour" / 3:39; 7. / "J'y crois" / 3:46; 8. / "Quand tu m'aimeras" / 3:46; 9. / "Vers le sud" / 3:53; 10. / "J'arrête demain" / 3:38; 11. / "Guitar Hero" / 3:23; 12. / "Square de la Trinité" / 3:46 | FRA: 243,722 | SNEP: 3× Platinum |
| Rester la même | 2020 | 2 | — | 4 | 8 | | | SNEP: Platinum |
| Toutes les larmes sèchent un jour | 2022 | 5 | — | 16 | 20 | | | SNEP: Gold |
| De l'ombre à la lumière | 2025 | — | — | 14 | — | | | |

=== Singles ===
| Title | Year | Peak positions | | Album |
| Title | Year | FRA | BEL (Wa) | Album |
|---|---|---|---|---|
| "Retourner là-bas" | 2019 | – | 46* (Ultratip) | Puisque c'est écrit |

*Did not appear in the official Belgian Ultratop 50 charts, but rather in the bubbling under Ultratip charts.
