= Arthur Cadre =

French dancer

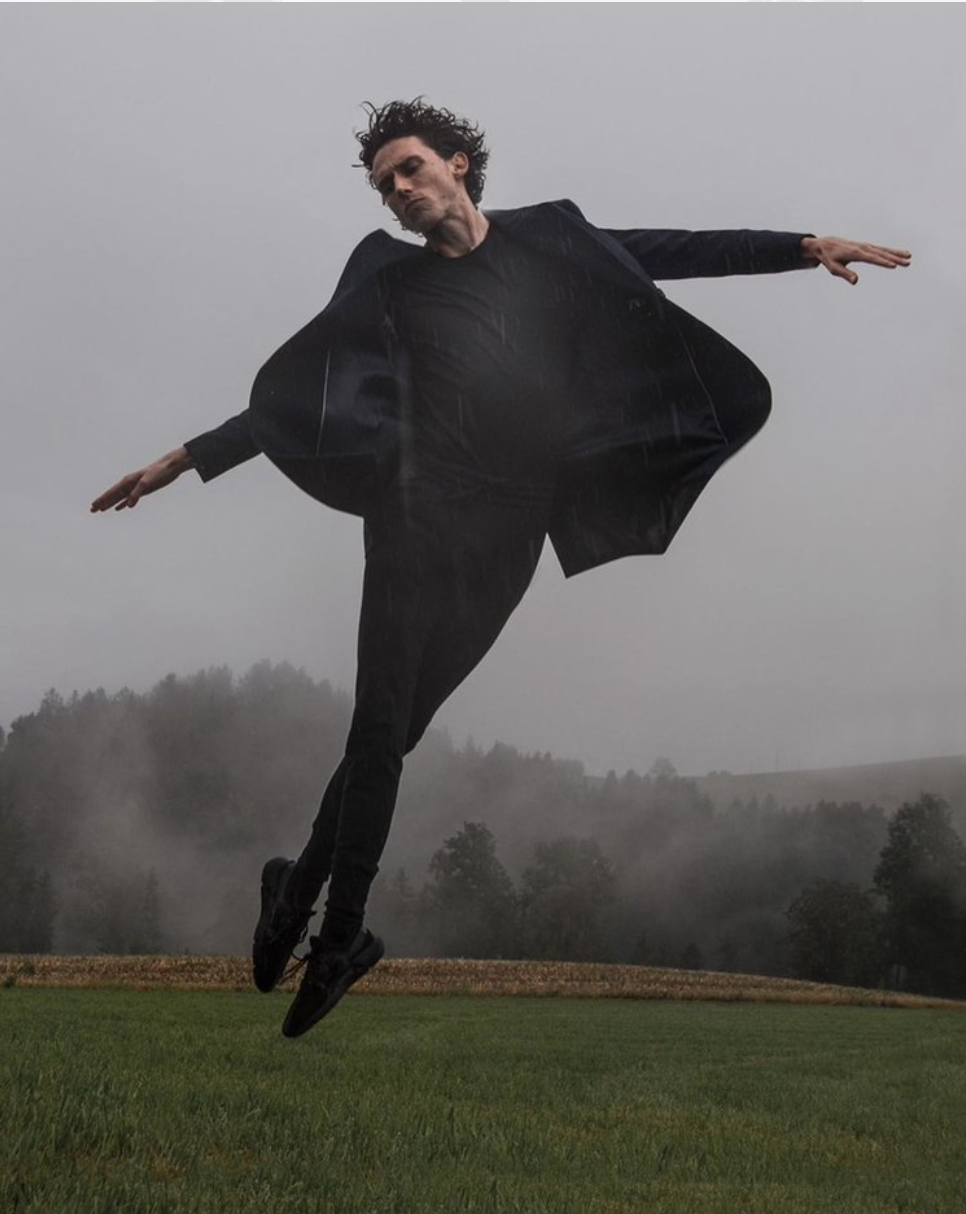
- Born: 1991 (age 34–35); Perros-Guirec, France
- Education: Bachelor of Arts and Science (The Britanny National College of Architecture); Master of Architecture (University of Montreal)
- Years active: 2000–present
- Known for: Yoga breakdance and choreography

Arthur Cadre (born 1991), also known as Lil Crabe, is a French dancer, contortionist, choreographer, model, stage director, magician and former architect. In 2022, he was featured in Forbes' 30 Under 30 list for his contributions to the Art & Culture field.

== Education and career ==
Cadre was born in Perros-Guirec, a small town in western France. His passion for dance began at the age of 9. He made his first television appearance on France's Got Talent when he was 14. During this performance, he introduced a unique dance style which later became known as Yoga Breakdance in 2011. Following his initial breakdancing showcase, Cadre started participating in international breakdancing competitions.

Cadre earned a Bachelor of Arts and Science from the Brittany National College of Architecture and a master's degree in architecture from the University of Montreal in 2014. Throughout his career, Cadre has performed on stages worldwide, collaborating with artists and organizations. He has worked as a lead performer in shows with Cirque du Soleil, an entertainment company, and collaborated with notable figures such as Scott Price, Celine Dion's musical director, and Indian film composer A.R. Rahman.

In 2017, Arthur was one of the lead performers in the show 'La Perle by Dragone' in Dubai. The show was directed by Franco Dragone. In July 2022, Arthur participated as a dancer in the "Dodici Note Tour" of Italian singer, Claudio Baglioni. The show was directed by Giuliano Peparini. He performed at the universal expo 2020, NFL halftime shows and F1Grand Prix. He performed in front of Celebrities such as Jennifer Lopez, Sharon Stone, Zinédine Zidane or Mariah Carey.

He was the stage director of ‘’Asayel’’, an extravaganza horse show with 25 horses & 40 dancers taking place in Riyadh.

Arthur Cadre participated in Alta Moda in Venice, a Fashion Show held in 2021 by Dolce & Gabbana. Additionally, he took part in the Cartier "Into the Wild" exhibition in Dubai in March 2023. He worked with Franco Dragone, the stage manager, and artistic director of Cirque du Soleil. Currently, he is teaching within the yoga community. Described by the Italian GQ as the "french avantguard of dance".

In 2024, he played the lead role of the Golden Voyager in "Records", the show imagined and directed by Thomas Jolly for the Paris Olympics closing ceremony, wearing a gilded costume made from upcycled materials by Swiss designer Kevin Germanier.

== Awards and achievements ==
Arthur Cadre was a finalist on the TV program France Has an Incredible Talent in January and was a semi-finalist in 2007.

In 2022, he was listed in Forbes' 30 Under 30 list for his contributions to the Art & Culture field.

In the same year, Cadre received a Cirque du soleil award for his dance piece.

In 2023, he also received the Dragone Trophee presented to him by Lucas Dragone, the son of Franco Dragone.
