= Sugar Sammy =

Canadian comedian, actor, writer, and producer (born 1976)

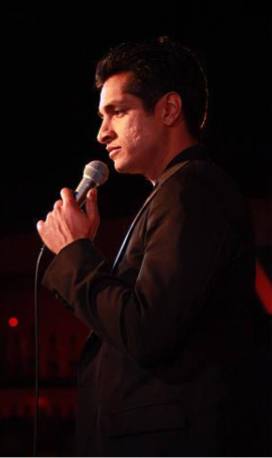
- Sugar Sammy in 2011
- Born: Samir Khullar; February 29, 1976 (age 50); Montreal, Quebec, Canada
- Alma mater: Marianopolis College; McGill University (BA)

Comedy career
- Years active: 1995-present
- Medium: Comedy, television
- Genres: Observational comedy, improvisational comedy
- Subjects: Society, politics, race, sex, pop culture
- Website: www.sugarsammy.com

Samir Khullar (born 29 February 1976), known professionally as Sugar Sammy, is a Canadian stand-up comedian, actor, writer, and producer from Montreal, Quebec. He performs internationally, in English, French, Punjabi, and Hindi. Khullar's comedy speaks to themes of multiculturalism and modern life. He has referred to himself as an "equal opportunity offender," citing early inspiration from the work of comedians Dave Chappelle, Chris Rock, Bill Burr, Ricky Gervais, and Sasha Baron Cohen.

== Early life ==
Khullar was born in 1976 to Indian parents in Montreal, Quebec, Canada. He grew up speaking Punjabi, Hindi, and English, and was made to attend a French-language school as a result of Bill 101.

== Career ==
=== Early Career and Name ===
Khullar performed comedy for the first time at a charity event at Marianopolis College, from which he graduated in 1995. While attending McGill University, Khullar made a living as a party promoter, working on his comedy part-time. During this period, Khullar explained in an interview, he would let women attend the parties he promoted for free and provided them with free drinks, which led to women calling him "Sugar Sammy."

=== Debut ===
In 2005, Khullar debuted in the Montreal Just for Laughs comedy festival alongside comedians W. Kamau Bell, Jo Koy, and Natasha Leggero. The following year, Khullar opened for Dave Chappelle in Toronto.

Khullar staged his first one-man show, Down with the Brown, in 2007. He presented an Indo-Canadian perspective on the topics of life in Quebec, sex, and race. The corresponding comedy album was released in January 2008, coinciding with a Canadian tour.

Khullar toured again in 2009, speaking on topics from arranged marriages to modern relationships. He then released the DVD Sugar Sammy Live in Concert: Direct from Montreal.

Khullar's 2009 HBO Canada special became one of the network's highest-rated specials, airing on Air Canada flights and topping Amazon Canada's stand-up comedy DVD list.

=== You're Gonna Rire ===
In 2011, Khullar debuted You're Gonna Rire, which combined English and French comedy. The show was adapted into a French-language show entitled En Français S.V.P.! ('In French, If You Please!'), the following year.

According to Billboard Boxscore, Khullar was the top-grossing domestic touring artist in Canada between the months of April 2013 and 2014. Khullar responded to the news, saying, “I just found that out. As long as [Nickelback] is taking a break and [Justin] Bieber’s in jail, it works out perfect for me.” Billboard clarified that with a gross of $2.9 million US, Khullar was only top ranking among domestic Canadian artists, not internationally touring Canadian artists like Nickelback and Bieber.

The scripted comedy TV show Ces gars-là co-written by Khullar and Simon-Olivier Fecteau, premiered on Quebec's French V network in February 2014. The show explored the friendship between two buddies with contrasting backgrounds. The series extended into three seasons.

In 2016, Khullar returned to Montreal's Just For Laughs comedy festival to perform You're Gonna Rire for the final time. He returned to the act in his second bilingual show, You're Gonna Rire 2, which he began performing in 2023.

=== Career in France ===
In 2016, Khullar left the Quebec comedy scene to begin work in France. He developed his show "Les préliminaires" specifically for the French market, having lived in Paris for eight months. After rehearsing at Le Point Virgule, a venue with about one hundred seats, he went on to perform the show twenty nights at l'Européen, a venue with a capacity of 350 seats. Khullar continued his residency at the Alhambra theatre until December 2018.

In 2018, the 13th season of the French talent show La France a un incroyable talent premiered with Khullar and singer Marianne James joining singer Hélène Ségara and magician Éric Antoine on the panel of judges. All four judges have returned for each new season of the program, as of 2025.

=== Riyadh Comedy Festival ===
In 2025, Khullar participated in Saudi Arabia's Riyadh Comedy Festival, an event characterized by Human Rights Watch as an effort by the Saudi government to whitewash its human rights abuses.

== Filmography ==
Year	Title	Type	Role	Notes
2001	Just for Laughs: Montreal Comedy Festival	TV special	Self	
2005, 2009	Video on Trial	TV series	Self	
2008	Just for Laughs	TV series	Self	
2009	The Ha!ifax Comedy Fest	TV series	Self	
2009	Good News Week	TV series	Self	Australian TV show
2009	Cracker Night	TV special	Self	Opening night gala showcase of the 2009 Sydney Comedy Festival
2009	Juste pour Rire	TV series	Self	
2011	Secrets of Montréal: Cultural Gems	TV special	Self	
2012	Just for Laughs: All-Access	TV series	Self	
2012	En audition avec Simon	TV series	Sugar Sammy	
2014	Les pêcheurs	TV series	Sugar Sammy	
2014–2016	Ces gars-là	TV series	Sam	
2014	Ces gars-là – Les coulisses	TV mini series	Self	
2018–	La France a un incroyable talent	TV series	Self – Jury	
