= Dave (singer) =

Dutch musical artist

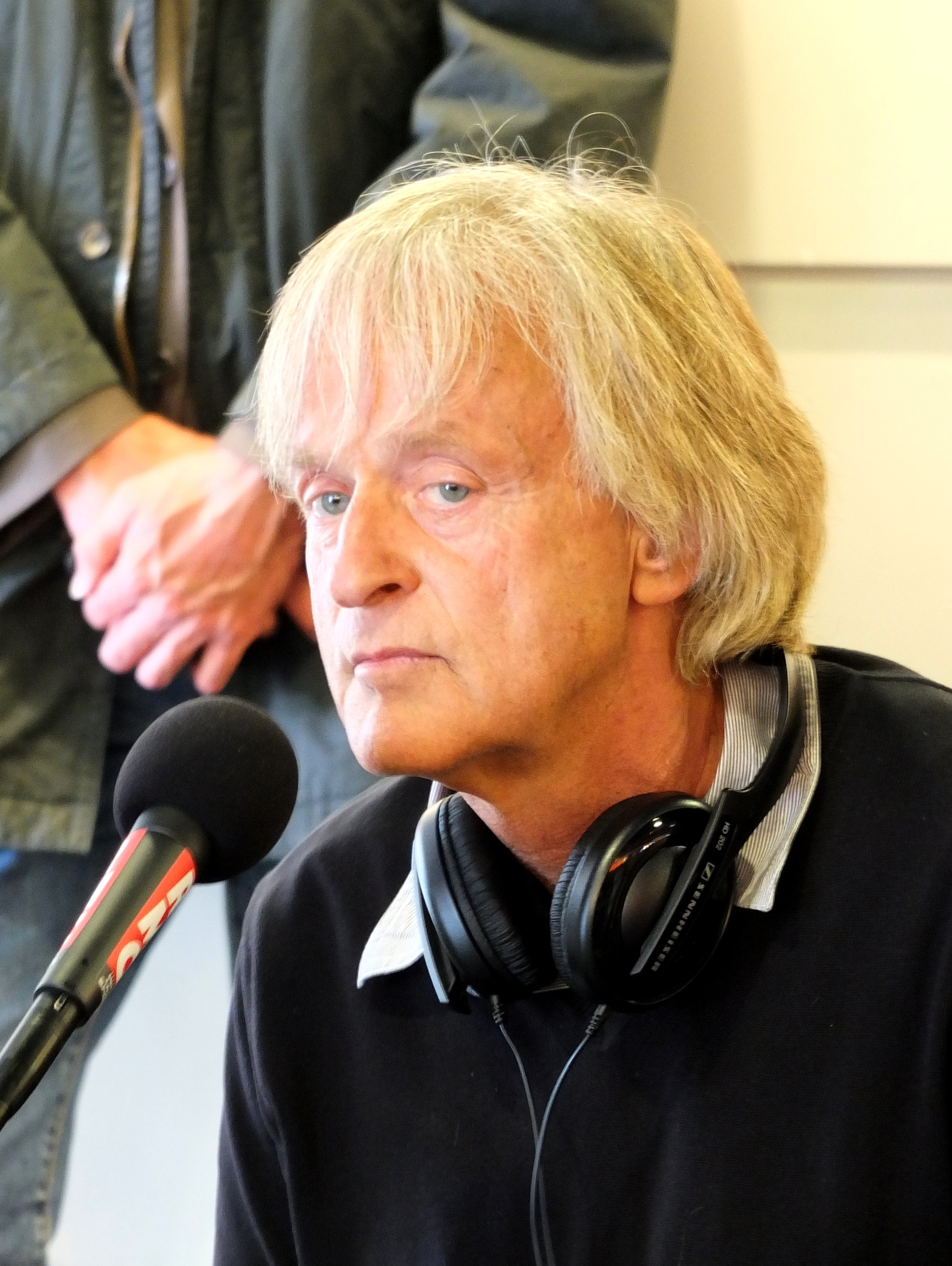
- Dave in 2012
- Born: Wouter Otto Levenbach; 4 May 1944 (age 82); Amsterdam, Netherlands
- Occupations: Singer; television host
- Years active: 1963–present
- Partner: Patrick Loiseau (1970s–present)
- Awards: Knight of the Order of Orange-Nassau
- Musical career
- Genres: MOR; pop; ballad
- Label: Columbia

Wouter Otto Levenbach (Dutch pronunciation: [ˈʋʌutər ˈɔtoː ˈleːvə(m)bɑx]; born 4 May 1944), known as Dave, is a Dutch Francophone singer who had a string of number one hits in France in the 1970s. A native of Amsterdam, he resides in Paris.

== Early life and education ==
Dave was born in Amsterdam. His father was Jewish and an English teacher by trade; his mother was a classical dancer. He has two brothers, Maarten and Lucas, and a sister, Elsbeth. He learned to play the guitar at age 14. He became a very spiritual person who prayed frequently and even planned to study theology; however, he eventually chose to study law.

Among other things, he was inspired by Jack Kerouac's On the Road , a revolutionary novel which encouraged young people to leave home and learn life "on the road", and to communicate with others. Passionate about the sea and rivers (a love which he owes to his grandfather), he left the Netherlands by boat with 1,000 guilders in his pocket (about two months' living expenses).

== Musical career ==
=== 1960s: Beginnings ===
He met Eddie Barclay, the executive for Barclay Records, in Saint-Tropez in 1968; Barclay was responsible for launching Dave's career in show business.

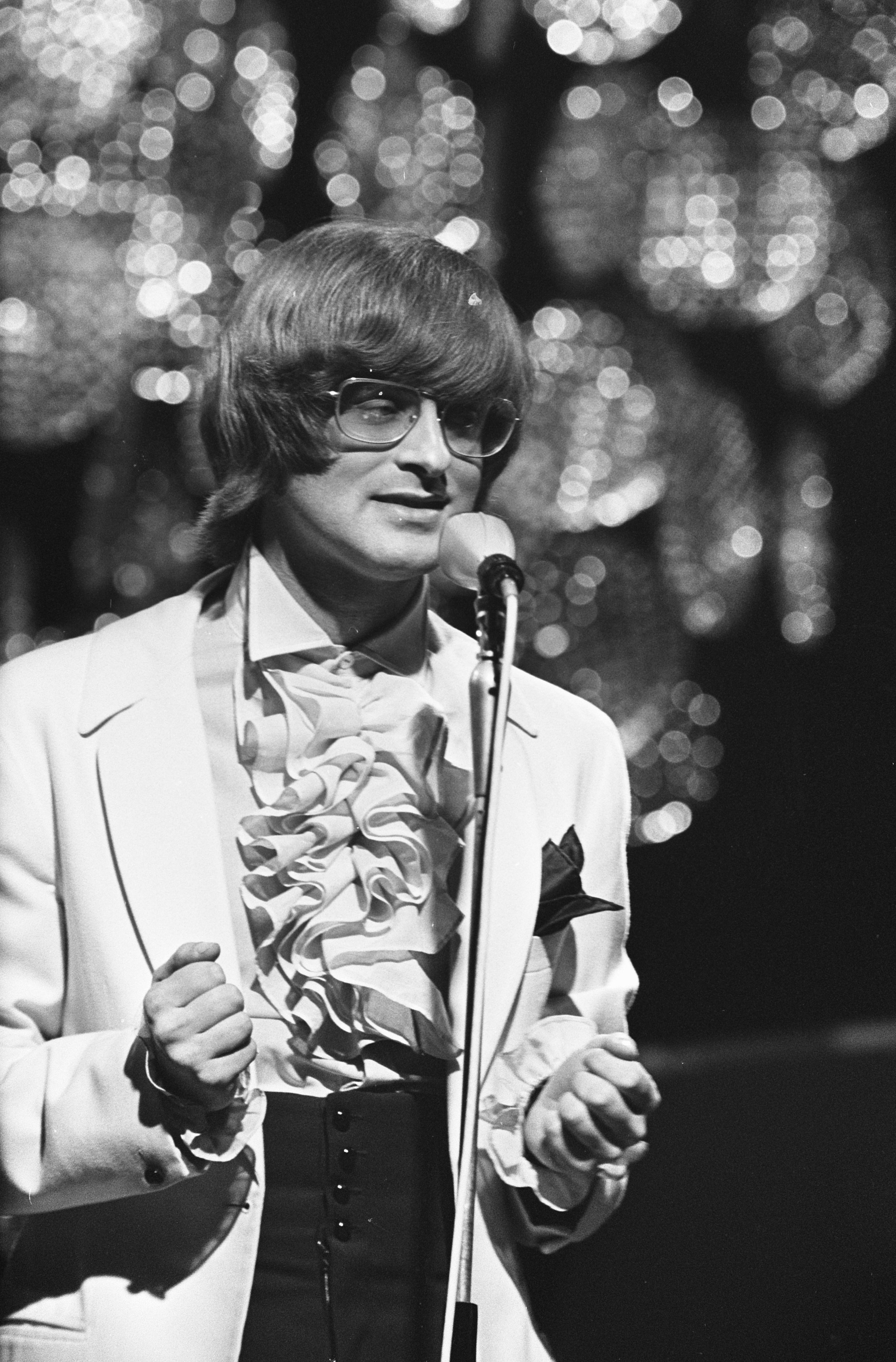
Dave in 1969

On 26 February 1969, he participated in the Nationaal Songfestival, the Dutch pre-selection contest for that year's Eurovision Song Contest with a song called "Niets gaat zo snel", but did not win. In Summer 1969 he reached the Dutch Top 40 charts for the first time with "Nathalie", peaking at No. 28.

=== 1970s: Peak ===
From 1971 to 1974, he was one of the actors in the musical Godspell, making friends with actor Daniel Auteuil, who would become his best friend.

In 1974, he released his first hit "Trop Beau", a French adaptation of The Rubettes' hit "Sugar Baby Love"; later that year, he released "Vanina", his first number one single in France, an adaptation of Del Shannon's "Runaway", adapted into French by Patrick Loiseau. These were followed in 1975 by the three hits "Mon cœur est malade" (based on the melody of The Wombles' "Banana Rock", written by Mike Batt), "Dansez maintenant" (based on Glenn Miller's "Moonlight Serenade") and "Du côté de chez Swann".

His self-titled first album was released at the end of 1975. By that time, he did not only have great success in France and Belgium, but also in his country of origin the Netherlands, where "Dansez maintenant" was a number 1 hit in the top 40 and "Du côté de chez Swann" made the top 10 too.

His later hits included "Lettre à Hélène" (1978), "Comment ne pas être amoureux de vous" (1978) and "Allo Elisa" (1979).

=== 1980s and 1990s ===
In the 1980s, his popularity waned following the advent of FM radio in France. He still had an audience due to live performances and his classic hits. However, he himself likened the ebb to a "crossing of a very pretty desert". In 1993, he released a new album, then in 1994, he made a comeback following the release of a greatest hits album, which sold more than 200,000 copies. He later recorded a new album entitled Toujours le même bleu, which included a title single from which enables him to hit the charts once again. It is also around this time that he came out as homosexual.

In 1996, he appeared in a commercial for Dutch cheese. He later became a co-presenter with Sheila of the TF1 television program Salut les Chouchous; after a year, he assumed the presenter duties alone. In 1997, publisher Lattès Editions published Dave's autobiography, Du côté de chez moi ("Around where I live"). An album, Dave classique, was released, fulfilling his dream to record some classical compositions.

=== 2000s and 2010s ===
From 2001 to 2005 Dave presented together with Flavie Flament and Denis Brogniart the TV event Domino Day on TF1. In 2003, he released another autobiographical book, Soit dit en passant... mes années paillettes, which dealt with his life as a showbiz celebrity in the 1970s. The book also revealed the love story which has united Dave with his lyricist and companion Patrick Loiseau for more than thirty years. The latter also participated in the work to share his version of the events.

In 2006, he released a new album under the name of "Dave Levenbach", Tout le plaisir a été pour moi. In September 2006, he played four special concerts at the Théâtre de l'Européen in Paris.

He was awarded Knight of the Order of Orange-Nassau on 17 April 2015.

== Selected discography ==
=== Albums ===
- 1976: Tant qu'il y aura (# 1/FR)
- 1979: Pour que tu me comprennes (# 1/FR)
- 1996: Toujours le même bleu
- 2004: Doux Tam Tam
- 2006: Tout le plaisir a été pour moi
- 2011: Blue-Eyed Soul !

=== Singles ===
French

- 1968: "Si je chante"
- 1974: "Trop beau"
- 1974: "Vanina" (# 1/FR)
- 1975: "Mon cœur est malade"
- 1975: "Dansez maintenant" (# 1/NL, #1/BE)
- 1976: "Du côte de chez Swann" (# 9/NL)
- 1976: "Ophélie"
- 1976: "Hurlevent"
- 1979: "Allo Elisa"
- 1980: "Maria Magdalena"
- 1996: "Boulevard des sans amour"

Dutch

- 1969: "Nathalie" (# 29/NL)
- 1969: "Niets gaat zo snel"
- 1990: "De eerste keer deed nog pijn"

English

- 1974: "Sugar Baby Love"
- 1974: "Runaway"

German

- 1975: "Mein Mädchen Monika"
- 1975: "Wie schön dich zu seh'n"
- 1980: "Und alles soll plötzlich zu Ende sein"

Italian

- 1969: "Il ricordo di Natalie"

Spanish

- 1975: "Vanesa"

Japan

- 1976: "Ginza Red Oui Oui" (30/JP）

== Filmography ==
=== Film ===
- 1981: Dickie-roi as Dickie-roi
- 1994: La Cité de la peur as himself
- 2006: Poltergay as himself
- 2013: Une chanson pour ma mère as himself

=== Television ===
Usually as a TV presenter

- 1996–1997: Salut les Chouchous (TF1)
- 2001–2002: Eurovision Song Contest (France 3), with Marc-Olivier Fogiel
- 2001–2005: Domino Day (TF1), with Flavie Flament and Denis Brogniart
- 2010–2013, 2015–2016: La France a un incroyable talent (M6), as a judge (2010–2013) and a guest judge (2015–2016)
- 2011–2012: Les années 1980 : le retour and Les années 1990 : le retour et Les années 2000 : le retour (M6), with Sandrine Corman
- 2014–2016: Du côté de chez Dave (France 3 and TV5Monde international)
- 2015: Téléthon (France 3), with Sophie Davant and Nagui
- since 2016: Même le dimanche (France 3), with Wendy Bouchard
