= Thomas Boissy =

French singer and songwriter

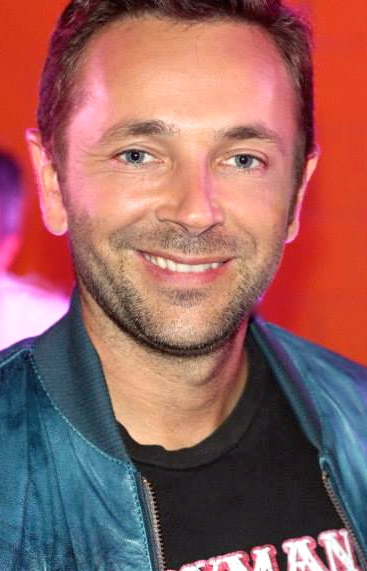

Background information
- Origin: Paris, France
- Genres: Acoustic; Folk; Pop; Rock
- Years active: 2007 to present
- Label: Independent
- Website: http://www.sellaband.com/thomasboissy/

Thomas Boissy is a French singer and songwriter. He began singing in musicals in the Folies Bergère and on French TV. In October 2007, he signed up to Sellaband and in February 2008 he reached the goal of US$50,000 to produce his own CD. He appeared in La France a un incroyable talent.
