= Louise Ekland =

British television presenter (born 1978)

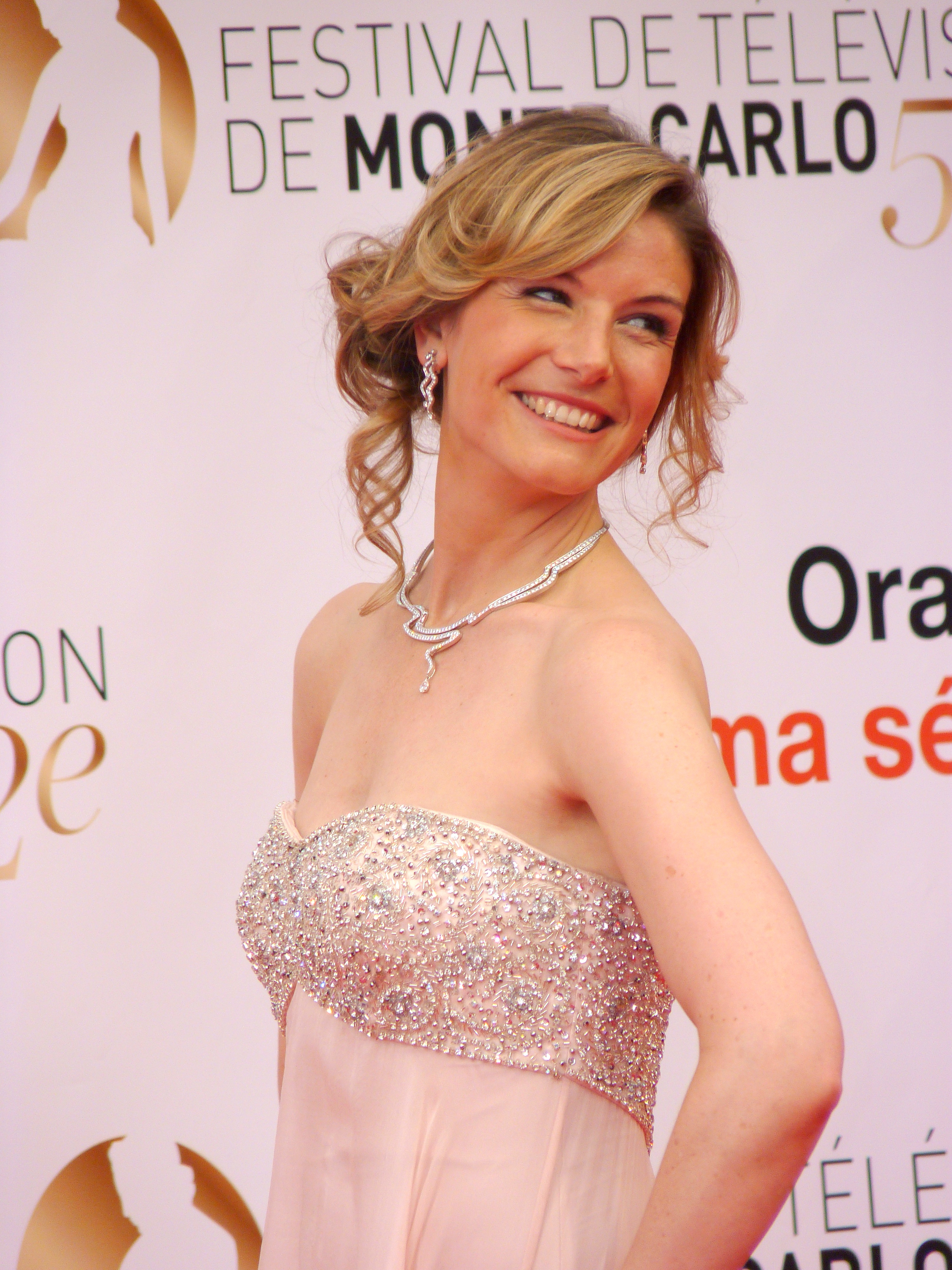
- Ekland at the 2012 Monte-Carlo Television Festival
- Born: 22 July 1978 (age 47); Liverpool, England, United Kingdom
- Occupation: Television presenter
- Years active: 2005–present
- Notable credit(s): Le grand morning Louise contre attaque 100% Mag; La France a un incroyable talent
- Television: Game One (2005–07); M6 (2007–08); Direct 8 (2007–08); France Télévisions (2008–13), (2017–present); BFM TV (2008–12); M6 Group (2014–17)

Louise Ekland (born 22 July 1978) is a British television presenter based in France. After presenting on France Télévisions, BFM TV and the M6 Group, she joined France 3 in 2017. She obtained French citizenship in 2024.

== Television career ==
From 2005 to 2006, Louise Ekland presented Le big show on Game One and Play hit from 2006 to 2007. In late 2007, she joined Direct 8 to present On aura tout vu in the early evening. From 2007 to 2008, she presented M6 music hits flash on M6 from Monday to Friday in the early morning and then the chronicle Le Morning.

In 2008, she joined France Télévisions to present on France 2 Cote & Match, dedicated to lottery games with sport prognostics of the Française des Jeux. The same year, she joined the news channel BFM TV to present a chronicle on show business from Monday to Friday.

In 2009, while still presenting on BFM TV, she presented on France 4 the FA Cup. From April 2009, succeeding Ray Cokes, she has presented the music programme Louise Contre Attaque on the same channel, covering different music festivals. In December 2010, she participated in the presentation of the Telethon on France Télévisions. In February 2011, she presented Frog & Rosbif with Énora Malagré on France 4. In March 2011, she participated as a member of the jury in the French version of Top Chef on M6.

In 2012 while still on BFM TV where she was presenting a daily evening programme, she presented in May La Nuit Doctor Who on France 4 and during the 2012 Summer Olympics in London, she visited the city in a bus every morning at the preamble of the sports broadcasts on France Télévisions.

In June 2012, she participated in the game Fort Boyard for the association "Enfants de la Lune" with Nelson Monfort, Stéphane Diagana, Frédérique Jossinet, Richard Dacoury and Jérôme Alonzo.

In September 2012, she joined the team of the talk show C à vous on France 5 and also participated as a guest in many public service programmes such as Oh les filles and Toute la télé chante pour Sidaction.

In July 2014, she presented the daily programme 100% Mag on M6, and then replaced Faustine Bollaert from September until the end of the broadcast in November of that year. She has also replaced Sandrine Corman as presenter of La France a un incroyable talent.

In September 2017, she returned to France Télévisions to present On a la solution ! on France 3 on Saturday morning.
