= World Buskers Festival =

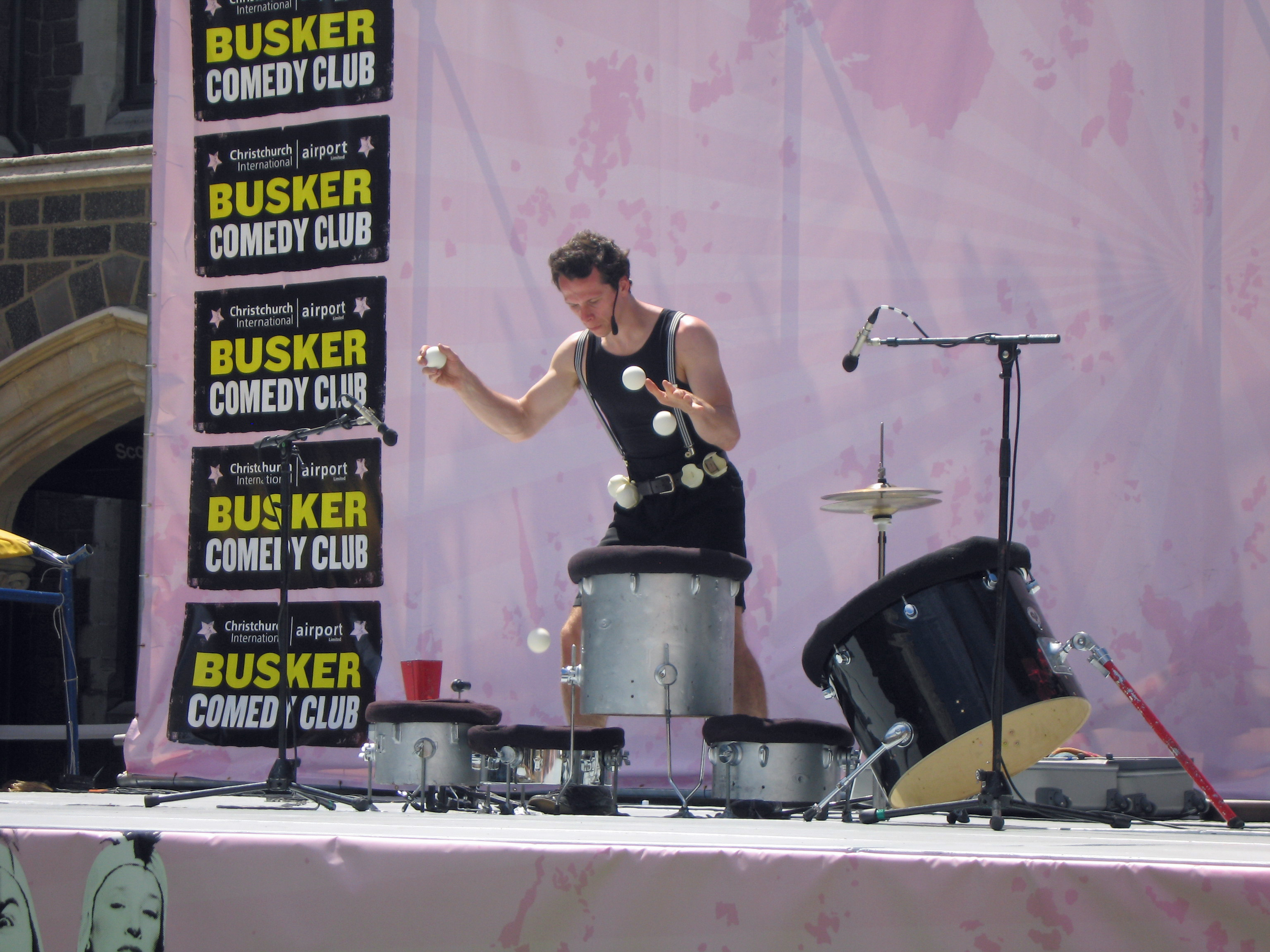
A juggler at the festival (2009)

The World Buskers Festival is a 10-day international festival of street performers that has been held annually since 1993 at the end of January in Christchurch, New Zealand.

"Busker" is originally the English term for street musicians, but in the context of the festival, it encompasses all areas of street art and street theater, such as juggling, acrobatics, clowning, magic, or stand-up comedy.

During the festival, hundreds of free events by street performers from around the world are held on various stages and squares throughout the city. Performances take place in the city centre, especially in Cathedral Square, Victoria Square the Arts Centre, and City Mall. All performers are paid solely from voluntary donations by their audience following each performance. Some clubs and the Arts Centre host evening events that require a mandatory donation as admission. These events are also restricted to adult visitors due to the often risqué nature of the presented comedy and shows.

At the 2009 Buskers Festival, officially 47 artists from eight nations gave over 400 performances, but every year numerous street performers not included in the official festival programme also perform simultaneously. Five of the New Zealand participants were nominated for the New Zealand Comedy Guild Awards.

== Visitors ==
Since the festival takes place without admission fees throughout the city centre, it is difficult to determine the exact number of visitors. According to a study by the Christchurch City Council, the festival attracted approximately 33,000 visitors in 2007, of whom 26,100 were primarily in Christchurch because of the festival. Over 250,000 people perceived the performances as part of daily life in Christchurch. 11.6% of all out-of-town visitors to the city cited the WBF as the main reason for their stay. In 2011, the city estimated approximately NZ$3 million in generated revenue from the festival. No data were collected for 2012 as the festival did not take place in the city centre following the Canterbury earthquakes.

According to the Lonely Planet travel guide, the WBF is one of the four most prominent festivals in New Zealand.
