= Jérôme Anthony =

French television presenter (born 1968)

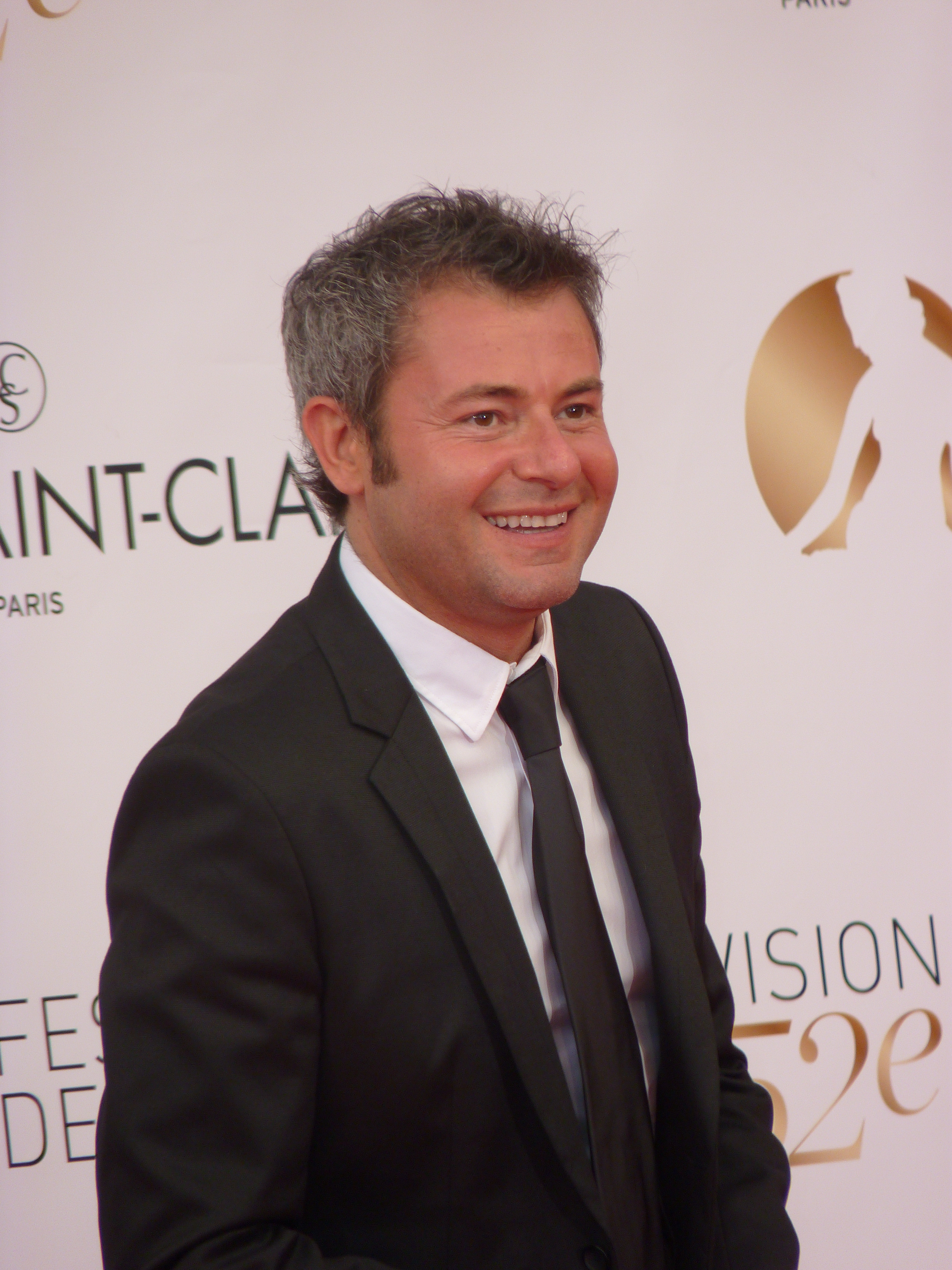
- Born: Jérôme Finkelstejn; 11 November 1968 (age 57); Nancy, France
- Occupation: TV host
- Employer: W9

Jérôme Finkelstejn better known as Jérôme Anthony is a French television presenter. Born in Nancy, France on 11 November 1968, he has presented many entertainment and reality shows on RTL9, TF1, France 2, Disney Channel, W9 and M6. He is the son of the proprietor of the Anthony clothing store and adopted the name as his stage name.

He started broadcasting at the age of 14 as a radio announcer on a weekly show called Bleu Citron on "Rockin' Chair" radio in Nancy. He eventually quit his studies to consecrate all his time to radio and worked on the local Nancy affiliate of Radio Fun for many years. He also produced many jingles and ads, most notably for "Solitair's Club" in Nancy.

His national fame started with the program Sacrée Soirée presented by Jean-Pierre Foucault on TF1, and as a candidate appearing in the talent show Jeune talent staying for 10 consecutive weeks. Then he releasing a CD that included "Quelque part, quelqu'un" composed by Didier Barbelivien.

In 2008-2009, he presented the television show Drôle de réveil! on M6 alongside Zuméo and Amélie Bitoun. He was also a host of Nouvelle Star, a French version of Idol on W9 and later M6 with Estelle Denis and in Nouvelle Star, ça continue with Camille Combal. In 2009, co-presented Absolument Stars and on M6. Also in 2009, he presented La France a un incroyable talent, ça continue as a second follow-up broadcast if the popular La France a un incroyable talent also on M6.

In 2010 he presented the M6 reality show Un trésor dans votre maison. In 2011, it was announced he would co-host the second series of French X Factor alongside Sandrine Corman.

== Television ==
Jérôme Anthony has been host and co-host of:

- Zapping Zone (1997-2004) Disney Channel
- Drôle de réveil! (2008-2009), M6
- Nouvelle Star, ça continue (2008-2009), W9 then M6
- La France a un incroyable talent, ça continue (2009) M6
- Un trésor dans votre maison (2010) M6
- X Factor (2011), M6
