= La France a un incroyable talent =

- Created by: Simon Cowell
- Presented by: Anthony Joubert; Alessandra Sublet; Sandrine Corman; Louise Ekland; Alex Goude; Jérôme Anthony; Donel Jack'sman; David Ginola; Pierre-Antoine Damecour; Karine Le Marchand; Juju Fitcats
- Judges: Valérie Stroh; Smaïn; Patrick Dupond; Jean-Pierre Domboy; Andrée Deissenberg; Dave; Sophie Edelstein; Giuliano Peparini; Olivier Sitruk; Lorie; Gilbert Rozon; Kamel Ouali; Sugar Sammy; Marianne James; Éric Antoine; Hélène Ségara
- No. of seasons: 20

Production
- Running time: 570 minutes
- Production companies: FremantleMedia; SYCOtv

Original release
- Network: M6
- Release: 2 November 2006 – present

La France a un incroyable talent ('France's Got Incredible Talent'), previously known as Incroyable Talent, is a French TV show, based on the Got Talent series. It debuted on M6 on 2 November 2006, and is currently presented by Karine Le Marchand.

== Summary ==
Seasons	1	2	3	4	5	6	7	8	9	10	11	12	13	14	15	16	17	18	19	20	21
Year	2006	2007	2008	2009	2010	2011	2012	2013	2014- 2015	2015	2016	2017	2018	2019	2020	2021	2022	2023	2024	2025	2026
Winner	Salah	Junior	Alex	Échos-Liés	Axel & Alizée	Marina Kaye	Die Mobilés	Simon Heulle	Bagad de Vannes	Juliette & Charlie	Antonio	Laura Laune	Jean-Baptiste Guégan	Le Cas Pucine	Famille Lefèvre	Le Chœur de Saint-Cyr	Rayane	Mega Unity	Mathieu Stepson	Duo EmYo	
Prize	150 000 €		100 000 €																		

Series	Host		Main Judge			
Series	Host		1	2	3	4
1	Alessandra Sublet	—N/a	Gilbert Rozon	Sophie Edelstein	Jean-Pierre Domboy	—N/a
2	Alessandra Sublet	—N/a	Gilbert Rozon	Sophie Edelstein	Patrick Dupond	—N/a
3	Alessandra Sublet	—N/a	Gilbert Rozon	Sophie Edelstein	Patrick Dupond	—N/a
4	Alex Goude	Sandrine Corman	Gilbert Rozon	Valérie Stroh	Smaïn	—N/a
5	Alex Goude	Sandrine Corman	Gilbert Rozon	Sophie Edelstein	Dave	—N/a
6	Alex Goude	Sandrine Corman	Gilbert Rozon	Sophie Edelstein	Dave	—N/a
7	Alex Goude	Sandrine Corman	Gilbert Rozon	Sophie Edelstein	Dave	—N/a
8	Alex Goude	Sandrine Corman	Gilbert Rozon	Sophie Edelstein	Dave	Andrée Deissenberg
9	Alex Goude	Louise Ekland	Gilbert Rozon	Lorie	Giuliano Peparini	Olivier Sitruk
10	Alex Goude	—N/a	Gilbert Rozon	Hélène Ségara	Éric Antoine	Kamel Ouali
11	David Ginola	—N/a	Gilbert Rozon	Hélène Ségara	Éric Antoine	Kamel Ouali
12	David Ginola	—N/a	—N/a	Hélène Ségara	Éric Antoine	Kamel Ouali
13	David Ginola	—N/a	Sugar Sammy	Hélène Ségara	Éric Antoine	Marianne James
14	David Ginola	—N/a	Sugar Sammy	Hélène Ségara	Éric Antoine	Marianne James
15	Karine Le Marchand	—N/a	Sugar Sammy	Hélène Ségara	Éric Antoine	Marianne James
16	Karine Le Marchand	—N/a	Sugar Sammy	Hélène Ségara	Éric Antoine	Marianne James
17	Karine Le Marchand	—N/a	Sugar Sammy	Hélène Ségara	Éric Antoine	Marianne James
18	Karine Le Marchand	—N/a	Sugar Sammy	Hélène Ségara	Éric Antoine	Marianne James
19	Karine Le Marchand	—N/a	Sugar Sammy	Hélène Ségara	Éric Antoine	Marianne James
20	Karine Le Marchand	—N/a	Sugar Sammy	Hélène Ségara	Éric Antoine	Marianne James
21	Karine Le Marchand	—N/a	Sugar Sammy	Eric Antoine	Hélène Ségara	Marianne James

=== Season 1 (2006) ===
The 1st season of the show was presented by Alessandra Sublet, and aired on M6 from November 2, 2006 to December 12, 2006. It was produced by Sébastien Zibi. The judging panel consisted of Gilbert Rozon, Sophie Edelstein and Jean-Pierre Domboy. The first season of the show attracted 5 million viewers. The grand prize was €150,000 and was won by dancer Salah Benlemqawanssa. This was the first Got Talent season that was won by Salah, who also won the 4th season of Arab's Got Talent in 2014.

=== Season 2 (2007) ===
The 2nd season of the show aired from November 6, 2007 to December 11, 2007 on M6. This season attracted an average of 4.3 million viewers. The final was viewed by 4.5 million people. Alessandra Sublet returned as the TV presenter of the show. This season was produced by Massimo Manganaro. Gilbert Rozon and Sophie Edelstein both returned as judges on the show. Jean-Pierre Domboy was replaced by Patrick Dupond. The winner of the season was dancer Junior, who received the €150,000 prize, and Arthur Cadre made it to the semi-finals.

=== Season 3 (2008) ===
The 3rd season of the show aired from October 2, 2008 to November 13, 2008 on M6. Alessandra Sublet returned as the TV presenter of the show. Gilbert Rozon, Sophie Edelstein and Patrick Dupond all returned as judges. The final was watched by over 4.3 million viewers with a peak audience of 5.1 million at 22:35. The winner of the season was fire artist Alexander, who received €100,000. In addition, during the final, pole acrobat Dominic Lacasse was offered an appearance at the International Circus Festival of Monte-Carlo by Princess Stéphanie of Monaco. This season also marked the debut of French singer Caroline Costa, who was 12 years old at her time of participation in the show. She was a finalist on the season and, while she did not win the show, she has since had a successful musical career.

=== Season 4 (2009) ===
The 4th season of the show aired from November 24, 2009 to December 30, 2009 on M6. This season was presented by Alex Goude and Sandrine Corman, who replaced Alessandra Sublet, the host of the previous three seasons. The judging panel consisted of producer Gilbert Rozon, actress and director Valérie Stroh, and comedian Smaïn. This season marked the change of the series' name from Incroyable Talent to La France a un incroyable talent. The season had an average audience of 3,657,000 viewers. The final was watched by 3.7 million people, and the largest audience was 4.2 million viewers, during the first semi-final. The winner of the season was dance group Les Échos-Liés, who received €100,000 and the opportunity to go on tour with magician Arturo Brachetti. The runner-up of the season was breakdancer Skorpion.

This season also marked the premiere of the show La France a un incroyable talent, ça continue... The show, presented by Jérôme Anthony, showcased behind-the-scenes footage and conversations with the contestants.

=== Season 5 (2010) ===
The 5th season of the show aired from November 3, 2010 to December 22, 2010 on M6. Alex Goude and Sandrine Corman returned as the TV presenters of the show. Gilbert Rozon remained as a judge on the show. Sophie Edelstein returned as a judge, after having left the judging panel during season 4. Additionally, the Dutch singer Dave joined the judging panel. The average audience of the show was 3,835,000 viewers. The winner of the season was child dance duo Axel & Alizée, who received €100,000 and a trip to Montreal to represent France at the Just for Laughs festival. The runner-up was soccer ball juggler Iya Traoré, who was a professional soccer player. Iya also later competed on the CBS television series The World's Best in 2019, where he was eliminated in the auditions.

=== Season 6 (2011) ===
The 6th season of the show aired from October 19, 2011 to December 14, 2011 on M6. Alex Goude and Sandrine Corman remained as the TV presenters of the show. Gilbert Rozon, Sophie Edelstein and Dave all returned as judges. The third episode of the season gathered 5.03 million viewers, making it the most-watched episode since the launch of the first season in 2006. The winner of the season was 13-year-old singer Marina Dalmas Kaye, who received the grand prize of €100,000, as well as the opportunity to participate in the Just for Laughs festival in Montreal and an appearance in the first part of the musical Adam and Eve: The Second Chance. The runner-up was child ventriloquist Nans.

=== Season 7 (2012) ===
The 7th season of the show aired from October 23, 2012 to December 26, 2012 on M6. Gilbert Rozon, Sophie Edelstein and Dave all remained on the judging panel. However, Dave was replaced by French composer and actor André Manoukian for part of the third episode while the singer participated in a concert. Alex Goude and Sandrine Corman remained as the TV presenters of the show. The winner of the season was shadow dance group Die Mobilés.

=== Season 8 (2013) ===
The 8th season of the show aired from October 15, 2013 to December 10, 2013 on M6. Gilbert Rozon, Sophie Edelstein and Dave all returned as judges on the show. Andrée Deissenberg was also added as a fourth judge. Alex Goude and Sandrine Corman remained as the TV presenters of the show. The winner of the season was pole acrobat Simon Huelle, and the runner-up was light-up dance group Infanlim, who perform in a similar style to that of the notable America's Got Talent contestant Light Balance.

=== Season 9 (2014–2015) ===
The 9th season of the show aired from December 9, 2014 to January 27, 2015 on M6. Alex Goude returned as a presenter of the show, but Sandrine Corman was replaced by Louise Ekland. Gilbert Rozon returned as a judge on the show. However, Sophie Edelstein, Dave and Andrée Deissenberg were replaced by singer Lorie, comedian and actor Olivier Sitruk and Italian choreographer Giuliano Peparini. The winner of the season was orchestra Bagad de Vannes Melinerion, and the runner-up was opera singer Marianne.

=== Season 10 (2015) ===
The 10th season of the show aired from October 20, 2015 to December 8, 2015 on M6. Gilbert Rozon remained as a judge on the show. Lorie, Olivier Sitruk and Giuliano Peparini were replaced by Hélène Segara, Kamel Ouali and Éric Antoine. Alex Goude returned as the sole presenter of the show. The winner of the season was dog act Juliette & Charlie, and the runner-up was singer Naestro (real name Nabil Rachdi), who used to be a boxer.

=== Season 11 (2016) ===
The 11th season of the show aired from October 25, 2016 to December 13, 2016 on M6. Alex Goude was replaced as the TV presenter of the show by David Ginola. Gilbert Rozon, Hélène Segara, Kamel Ouali and Éric Antoine all returned as judges on the show. The winner of the season was magician Antonio Bembibre, and the runner-up was singer Mickaël Dos Santos.

=== Season 12 (2017) ===
The 12th season of the show aired from November 16, 2017 to December 14, 2017 on M6 with judges Éric Antoine, Hélène Ségara and Kamel Ouali. This was the first season in the history of the show where Gilbert Rozon was not included as a judge due to him stepping down from the position after several sexual harassment allegations were filed against him. The winner of the season was comedic singer and guitarist Laura Laune, and the runner-up was dance group Soda Crew.

=== Season 13 (2018) ===
The 13th season started being broadcast during October 2018. The panel of judges for the show included 2 new members: Marianne James (singer) and Sugar Sammy (comedian). Hélène Ségara (singer) and Éric Antoine (magician) signed a contract to remain as judges for season 13. David Ginola remained as the TV presenter of the show. The winner was singer Jean-Baptiste Guegan, and the runner-up was dance duo Dakota & Nadia.

=== Season 14 (2019) ===
The 14th season began on October 22, 2019. Éric Antoine, Hélène Ségara, Marianne James and Sugar Sammy all returned as judges. David Ginola returned as the TV presenter of the show. The winner of the season was ventriloquist Le Cas Pucine, and the runner-up was stand-up comedian Valentin Reinehr.

=== Season 15 (2020) ===
The 15th season began on October 20, 2020. Éric Antoine, Hélène Ségara, Marianne James and Sugar Sammy all returned as judges, while Karine Le Marchand took over as host. Famille Lefèvre won the season on December 15, 2020.

=== Season 16 (2021) ===
The 16th season began on October 20, 2021. Éric Antoine, Hélène Ségara, Marianne James and Sugar Sammy all returned as judges, while Karine Le Marchand returned to host. The show was won by Le Chœur de Saint-Cyr on December 22, 2021.

=== Season 17 (2022) ===
The 17th season began on October 18, 2022. Éric Antoine, Hélène Ségara, Marianne James, and Sugar Sammy all returned as judges, while Karine Le Marchand returned as host. The show was won by Rayane on December 20, 2022.

=== Season 18 (2023) ===
The 18th season began on October 24, 2023. Éric Antoine, Hélène Ségara, Marianne James, and Sugar Sammy all returned as judges, while Karine Le Marchand returned as host. The show was won by the dance troupe Mega Unity on December 19, 2023.

=== Season 19 (2024) ===
The 19th season began on October 23, 2024. Éric Antoine, Hélène Ségara, Marianne James, and Sugar Sammy all returned as judges, while Karine Le Marchand returned as host. The show was won by illusionist and mentalist Mathieu Stepson on December 20, 2024.

=== Season 20 (2025) ===
The 20th season began on October 14, 2025. Éric Antoine, Hélène Ségara, Marianne James, and Sugar Sammy all returned as judges, while Karine Le Marchand returned as host. The show was won by the dancers and acrobats of Duo EmYo on December 16, 2025.

=== Season 21 (2026) ===
The 21th season began on October 7, 2026. Éric Antoine, Hélène Ségara, Marianne James, and Sugar Sammy all returned as judges, while Karine Le Marchand returned as host.

== Spin-Offs ==
=== La Bataille Du Jury (2020) ===
La France a un incroyable Talent: la Bataille du jury began on June 23, 2020. Éric Antoine, Hélène Ségara, Marianne James and Sugar Sammy all returned as judges. David Ginola returned as the TV presenter of the show. Each judge chose a team of six contestants, which included five contestants from previous seasons of La France a un incroyable talent and one contestant from an international version of the series, including acts from Britain's Got Talent and America's Got Talent. The winner of the season and the €100,000 prize was motorcyclist Kenny Thomas from team Hélène Ségara, who had previously finished in 4th place on season 11 of La France a un incroyable talent. The runner-up was improvisational comedic singer Thomas Boissy from team Éric Antoine, who had previously finished in 4th place on season 6 of La France a un incroyable talent.

== See also ==
- David Ginola
- List of French adaptations of television series from other countries
