= Marianne James =

French singer (born 1962)

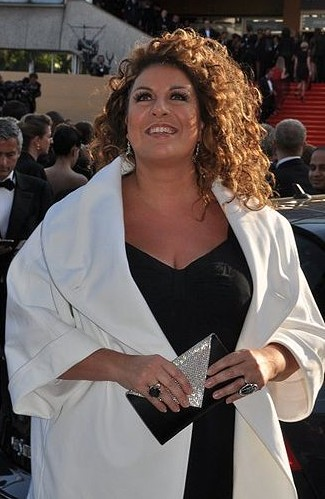
- Marianne James at the 2010 Cannes Film Festival.

Background information
- Born: 18 February 1962 (age 64); Montélimar, Drôme, France
- Genres: Chanson, pop
- Occupations: singer, actress, writer, TV Host, fashion designer
- Years active: 1981–present

Marianne James (born 18 February 1962) is a French singer, writer, actress, TV host and fashion designer. She has co-presented the French coverage of the Eurovision Song Contest.

== Early life ==
Born in Montélimar, Marianne Gandolfi grew up in the family shop, Place du Marché, with her father Maurice, chocolatier pastry chef and nougatier, her mother Jacqueline, from whom she gets her Italian origins, and her sister Pascale, four years older than her.

She took guitar lessons at the age of 11 with Antoine Petrucciani, known as "Tony", a renowned jazz guitarist and father of pianist Michel Petrucciani. From the age of 15 to 23, she took advantage of her holidays to sing in the streets with her sister and a friend.

In 1980, after creating her first group "The Swingums", she graduated with a degree in musicology from Sorbonne University and won a first prize for singing at the Conservatoire de Paris.

In 1981, Marianne James joined the band "Les Démones Loulou" with whom she opened for William Sheller at the Olympia. She continued to sing in the streets of Paris.

== Theater ==
Year	Title	Author	Director	Notes
1991–2002	L'Ultima Recital, les adieux irrévocables	Marianne James & Veronique Vola	Jango Edwards	Molière Award for Best Musical Show (1999); Nominated - Molière Award for Best Musical Show (1997)
2003–2006	Le Caprice de Marianne	Marianne James & Laurence Boccolini	Marianne James	
2008	The Mad Adventures of Rabbi Jacob	Gérard Oury & Danièle Thompson	Patrick Timsit	
2009	Les Insatiables	Hanokh Levin	Guila Braoudé	
2011	Une visite inopportune	Copi	Philippe Calvario	
2013–2018	Miss Carpenter	Sébastien Marnier & Marianne James	Éric-Emmanuel Schmitt & Steve Suissa	
2018–2021	Tatie Jambon	Valérie Bour & Marianne James	Aude Léger	
2022–2025	Tout est dans la voix	Marianne James & BenH	Marianne James	

== Album ==
- 1999 : Les Mandarines
- 2006 : Marianne James
- 2015 : Les Symphonies Subaquatiques
- 2016 : Tous au lit !
- 2018 : Tous heureux !

== Television ==
Year	Title	Role	Notes
2004-2007	Nouvelle Star	Judge	M6
2009	Vive les comédies musicales !	Host	TF1
2010	Un monde tout nu	Host	Jimmy
2010	Rendez-vous en terre inconnue	Guest	France 2
2011	Queens of Pop	Host	Arte
2014–2017	Prodiges	Host	France 2
2015–2017	Eurovision Song Contest	Commentator	France 2 & France 4
2016	Cinq à sept avec Arthur	Columnist	TF1
2016	Gala de l'Union des artistes	Host	France 4
2016–2017	A vos pinceaux	Host	France 2 & France 4
2018–2024	La France a un incroyable talent	Judge	M6
2022	Drag Race France	Guest Judge	France.tv Slash / France 2
2022	Mask Singer	Contestant	TF1

== Filmography ==
=== Actress ===
Year	Title	Role	Director	Notes
2013	La croisière	Amanda Saint-Gil	Pascal Lahmani	TV series (1 episode)
2017	Scènes de ménages: ça va être leur fête	The Singer	Francis Duquet	TV movie
2018	Nina	Valérie	Hervé Brami	TV series (1 episode)
2018	Mongeville	Agnès de Barneville	Bénédicte Delmas	TV series (1 episode)
2024	Face à face	Agnès Tancelin	Jean-Christophe Delpias	TV series (10 episodes)

=== Dubbing ===
Year	Title	Role
2004	Harry Potter and the Prisoner of Azkaban	The Fat Lady
2006	Happy Feet	Mrs. Astrakhan
2012	Madagascar 3: Europe's Most Wanted	Captain Chantel DuBois
2016	Salaire net et monde de brutes	Future Advisor Interim
