= Gilbert Rozon =

Canadian businessman (born 1954)

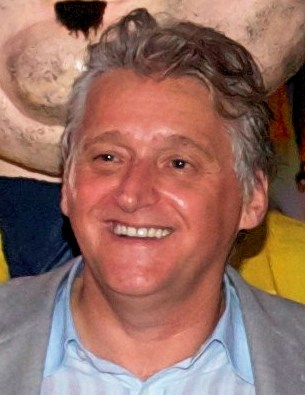
- Rozon in 2010
- Born: October 26, 1954 (age 71); Montreal, Quebec, Canada
- Known for: Founder of Just for Laughs
- Spouse: Danielle Roy
- Children: 3

Gilbert Rozon (born October 26, 1954) is a Canadian businessman and founder of the Just for Laughs (French: Juste pour Rire) comedy festival, which he created on July 14, 1982. He is also responsible for the development and international deployment of the Just for Laughs/Juste pour Rire brand in over 150 countries. The Just for Laughs festival is considered the largest comedy festival in the world.

== Early life and education ==
Gilbert Rozon is the eldest of seven children. Raised in Saint-André d'Argenteuil, he began working at a young age as a paperboy. At the age of 14 he became a gravedigger, salesman, printer, show organizer, publisher of telephone directories business, key to real estate, etc. It is in this context from his work experience that he developed his sense of humour. After a short stay in France at age 20, he studied law at the Université de Montréal where he graduated.

== Career ==
In 1980, he founded the La Grande Virée (English: The Grand Excursion) festival in Lachute which welcomed more than 60,000 spectators in its first year and more than 80,000 in 1981. For its third year, Gilbert Rozon moved La Grande Virée to the Pointe-aux-Trembles neighbourhood in Montreal. It was a failure.

Despite the failure of his first festival in Montreal, Rozon borrowed more than C$1 million to found the Just for Laughs festival in 1982. The festival was based in Montreal, although spread to Toronto, Chicago, Nantes and Paris.

Rozon was the impresario of Charles Trenet until his death. He was the producer of shows featuring Laurent Ruquier, Franck Dubosc, Dieudonné, Florence Foresti, Arturo Brachetti, Stéphane Rousseau, Jean-Marc Parent, Jean-Luc Lemoine, Rachid Badouri, André Sauvé, Christophe Alévêque, etc.

Just for Laughs represents over 75 artists, over 200 hours of television broadcast in over 150 countries each year and hundreds of shows a year. For 25 years, Gilbert Rozon has been at the helm of the festival before giving way to Alain Cousineau with whom he founded the festival in 1983. He remains chairman and CEO of the group.

From 2006 until his firing in 2017, he served as a judge on the French program, La France a un incroyable talent.

== Sexual assault allegations ==
In 1998, Gilbert Rozon received an unconditional discharge from the Quebec Superior Court after pleading and being found guilty of a sexual assault on a 19-year-old woman, because a criminal record would have made it difficult for him to travel internationally for his work. He was also accused of unlawful confinement of a 31-year-old woman but the charge was withdrawn by the police for lack of evidence. Groups of women expressed anger over sentencing they considered as being too lenient.

On October 18, 2017, Rozon announced he was resigning from his position as the President of Just for Laughs as well as the vice-president of the Montreal Metropolitan Board of Trade, amid allegations of sexual misconduct.

On December 15, 2020, following three years of lengthy, drawn out trials, he was cleared of all charges.

Rozon is still the object of civil suits filed by six women, who claim he sexually assaulted them. The total amount claimed is in excess of $9-million.

On March 31, 2026 he was condemned to pay $880,000 to eight of the nine women who accused him of sexual misconduct.
