= Éric Antoine =

French magician and television presenter

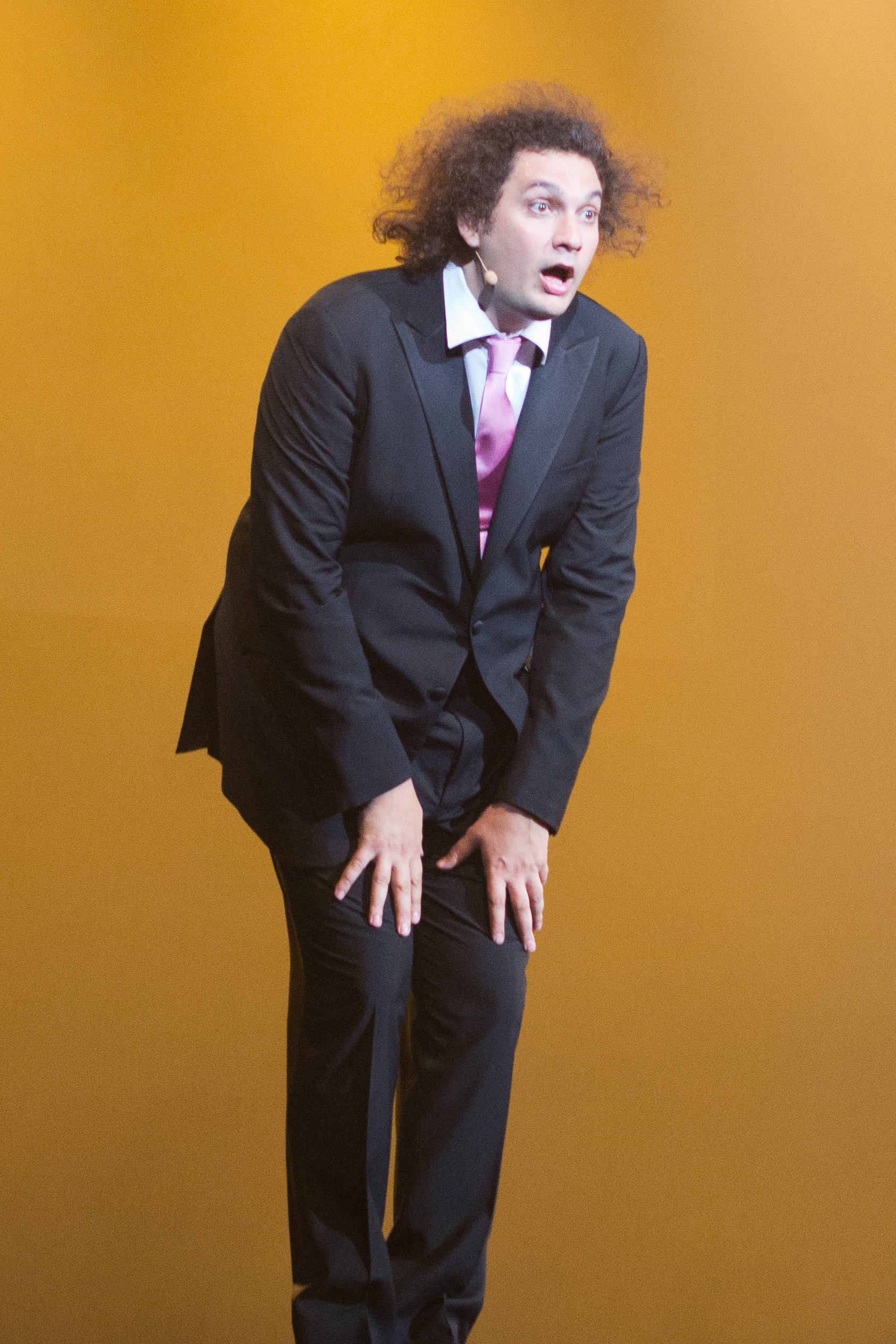
- Antoine at the Casino de Paris in 2012
- Born: 23 September 1976 (age 50); Enghien-les-Bains, France
- Occupations: Comedy magician, theatre director, actor, television presenter

Éric Antoine (born 23 September 1976) is a French comedy magician, theatre director, actor and television presenter.

== Career ==
In 2006, he was a contestant on the first season of La France a un incroyable talent on M6. That same year, he received a Mandrake d'Or. Antoine has been one of the show's judges since 2015. He presented the French version of All Together Now in 2019. He has been the presenter of the French version of Lego Masters since 2020 and Show Me Your Voice since 2021. He has appeared in one episode of the French version of Top Chef in 2018 and has been a contestant on Fort Boyard in 2020.

He has been the TV presenter of Le Juste Prix since 2024, and La Roue de la fortune since 2025 on M6.

== Personal life ==
Since 2025, he is in a relationship with Gennifer Demey.
