= Alex Goude =

French television presenter

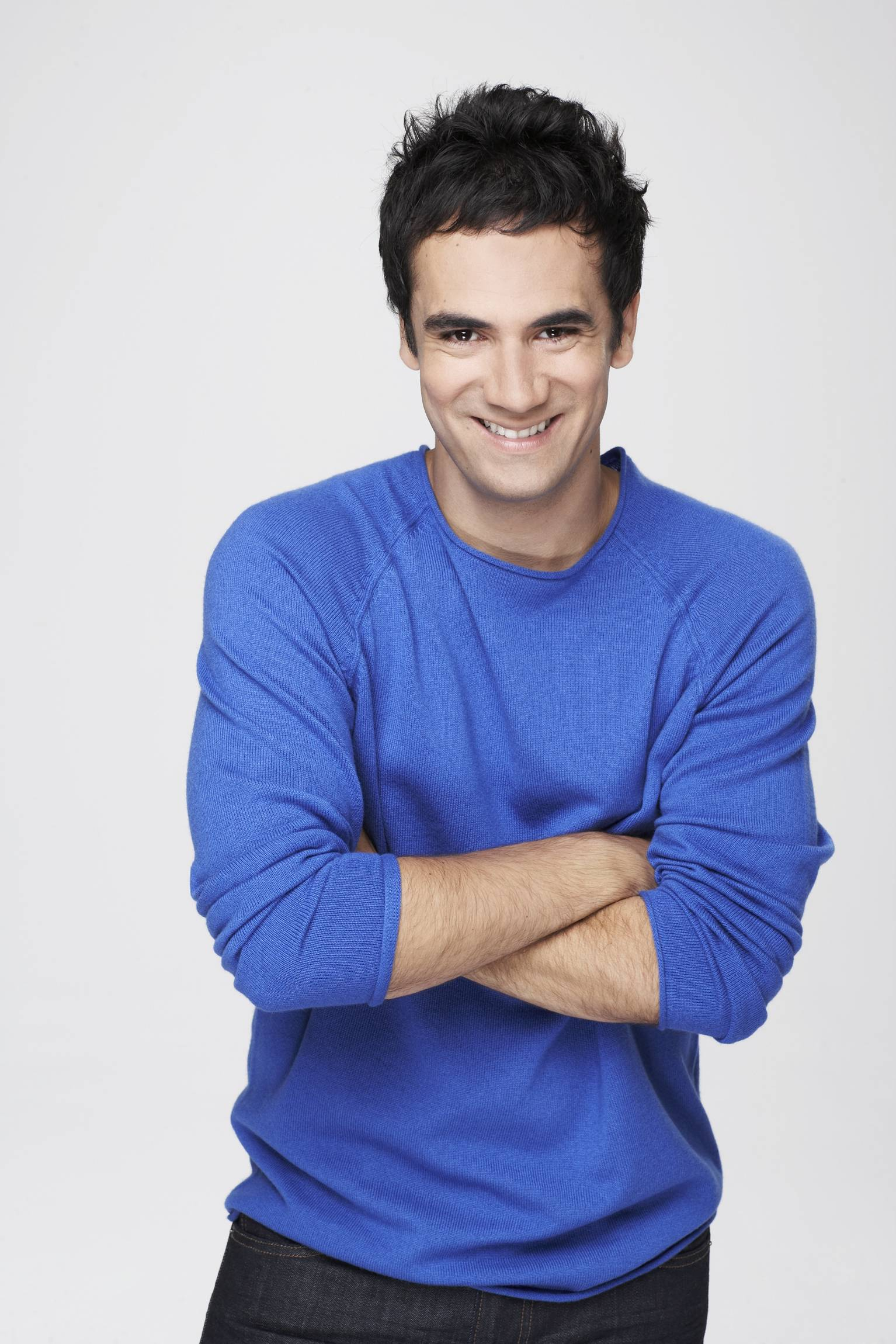
- Goude in 2012
- Born: Alexandre Goudeau; 13 August 1975 (age 51); Neuilly-sur-Seine, France
- Occupation: TV host
- Spouse: Romain Taillandier (m. 2013; div. 2018)
- Children: 1

Alexandre Goudeau (French pronunciation: [alɛksɑ̃dʁ ɡudo]; born 13 August 1975), better known as Alex Goude (/ɡʊd/ "good", French: [ɡud]), is a French television host, author and actor.

== Career ==
He started as a footballer. He started as a journalist in video games including Le Journal de Mickey, for which he still works.

At 25, he took acting classes. He co-wrote and directed Théatrouille Comedia theater in Paris in 2005. He played Les homos préfèrent les blondes for a year at the Temple Theater in Paris.

He began a career as an animator on Disney Channel, then worked on M6, Canal + and France 2.

In 2006, he presented the weather on Canal + and since 2008, on M6 with Cali Morales and Laurence Roustandjee. He is known for his sense of humor during the weather and uses many puns.

On 3 December 2008, he made his first appearance at 8:45 pm on M6 during the match for the UEFA Cup Manchester City - Paris Saint-Germain that he presented alongside, among others, Thierry Roland.

He hosted Le Grand Bétisier de 2008 on 22 December 2008 in prime time alongside Sandrine Corman, Miss Belgium 1997.

During summer 2009, he hosted Total Wipeout alongside Stéphane Rotenberg and Corman.

Since 7 September 2009 to winter 2012, he has hosted the weather at 7:45 pm on M6.

From 2009 to 2015, he presented La France a un incroyable talent, originally with Sandrine Corman until 2013, then Louise Ekland in 2014 and solo in 2015.

== Filmography ==
- 2009: Cloudy With a chance of meatballs: the weather guy
- 2013: Hôtel Transylvania: Jonathan
- 2013: Lanfeust Quest, TV cartoon based on the comic Lanfeust Quest (26 épisodes of 26 mn on M6 and Gulli)
- 2015: Hôtel Transylvania 2: Jonathan

== TV ==
- 2003-2004: Zapping Zone (Disney Channel) TV show host
- 2004-2005: Le Grand Journal (Canal+): weather guy
- 2006: Capman (M6): a super hero
- 2006: On n'a pas tout dit (France 2): funny guy
- 2007: Le People Show (JET TV) TV show host
- 2008-2012: Météo (M6): weather guy
- 2009-2011: A vos casques (M6) TV show host
- 2009: Total Wipeout (M6) TV show host
- 2009: Le Grand Bêtisier des Stars (M6) TV show host
- 2009-2015: La France a un incroyable talent (M6) - seasons 4 to 10 TV show host
- 2010: soccer expert on all Europa League matches (M6)
- 2010: Le Grand Bêtisier de l'été, with Sandrine Corman (M6) TV show host
- 2010: Le Grand Bêtisier de Noël, with Sandrine Corman (M6) TV show host
- 2011: Le Grand Bêtisier de l'Hiver, with Agathe Lecaron (M6) TV show host
- 2011-2016: Le Grand Bêtisier de l'été (M6) TV show host
- 2012: L'Inventeur 2012 (M6) TV show host
- 2012: Pékin Express: Le Passager mystère (M6): guest star
- 2012-2013: 60 secondes chrono (M6) - seasons 1 and 2 TV show host
- 2011-2013: Top Chef (M6): guest cook
- 2014- 2016: Total Blackout (W9) TV show host
- 2015-2017: Fort Boyard-Contestant Theater Actor
- 2002: Le mariage de Figaro (Figaro)
- 2003-2005: Theatrouille (Ben)
- 2005-2008: Les Homos prefèrent les blondes: (Cosmos) 2016: Twisted Vegas (himself)

== Commercial actor ==
- 2009: Microsoft for Windows 10
- 2012: Coca-Cola
- 2012: Intermarché
- 2013: Seat Leon

== Director ==
- 2003-2005: Théatrouille in Theatre Comedia in Paris
- 2009-2010: Private Joke in Theatre le Temple in Paris
- 2012-2013: Dans l'air du temps - One-woman-show with Anne Bernex in Theatre Le Temple in Paris.
- 2014-2015: Tous des malades by Jean-Jacques Thibaud in Palais des Glaces in Paris
- 2016: Timéo by Jean-Jacques Thibaud in Casino de Paris in Paris.
- 2016: Twisted Vegas by Alex Goude and Michael Goudeau at the Westgate Resort in Las Vegas
- 2016: Xavier Mortimer's Magical Dream by Alex Goude and Michael Goudeau at the Planet Hollywood resort in Las Vegas

== Playwright ==
- 2003: Théatrouille
- 2016: Twisted Vegas
- 2016: Xavier Mortimer's Magical Dream
