= Sandrine Corman =

Belgian television and radio presenter

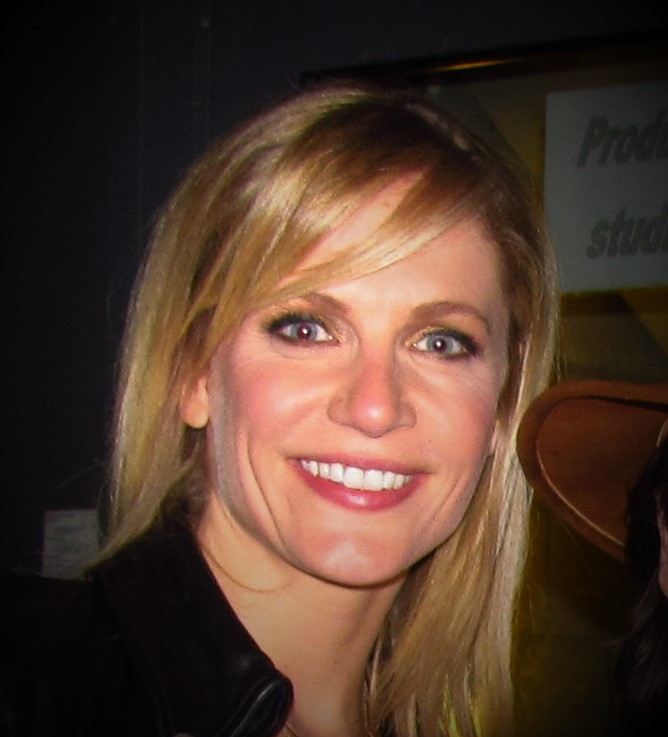
- Born: 12 April 1980 (age 44); Verviers, Liège, Belgium
- Occupation(s): Television presenter, radio presenter
- Years active: 1998–present
- Notable credit(s): X Factor; La France a un incroyable talent Top Chef; Zéro de Conduite; Total Wipeout; Le Grand Bêtisier; L'Inventeur 2012; Accès Privé; Must Célébrités
- Television: RTL-TVI, M6, 6ter, TF1, TMC

Sandrine Corman (born 12 April 1980 in Verviers, Belgium) is a Belgian tv host and beauty pageant titleholder.

== Pageants ==
Corman was Miss Belgium 1997 at the age of 17. She later stated that she was not interested in the contest and that her mother had registered her. She then represented her country at Miss World 1997 and Miss Universe 1998.

== Television career ==
In 1998, Corman began her television career on RTL-TVI on the program Clip Party. Before joining the team of the program Ça alors!, she worked in continuity. She then hosted a number of television programs such as Les balades de Sandrine, Mister Belgium, Si c'était vous, Télévie, and Ça vous fait rire.

In September 2008, she met the director of the programs of M6 who suggested several projects of programs to present. A few months later, Corman started on M6 hosting Le Bêtisier 2008 with Alex Goude. She continued working for Belgian television, and hosted Miss Belgium 2008.

In summer 2009, she hosted with Stéphane Rotenberg and Alex Goude the program Total Wipeout on M6 and RTL-TVI. She has presented since 2008 La France a un incroyable talent with Goude, after the departure of Alessandra Sublet for France Télévisions. In December 2009, she presented Le Grand Bêtisier de l'année with Goude for the second consecutive year. In February 2010, she started presenting with Rotenberg the French version of Top Chef on M6, also broadcast on RTL-TVI. In September 2010, she presented Le Grand Bêtisier de l'été with Goude. She participated in November 2010 in Pékin Express, duos de choc with Stéphane Plaza.

In January 2011, she hosted Miss Belgium 2011 with Véronique De Kock. She also hosted the program Zéro de Conduite with Jérôme Anthony on M6. She presented the second series of X Factor on M6 from March to June 2011. In May 2012, she participated in Pékin Express, la passager mystère. In 2012, she co-hosted the program L'Inventeur 2012 with Alex Goude. In September 2012, she replaced Faustine Bollaert as host of Accès privé on M6. In September 2013, she presented a program similar to Accès Privé titled Must Célébrités; the broadcast ended on 10 May 2014.

She was not present at the ninth season of La France a un incroyable talent in September 2014. After a lack of audience in 2013, the channel wanted to offer a new dynamic vision to the program. Corman then left M6 to join TMC, a channel of the TF1 Group, where she started presenting on 24 June 2015 the French version of Got to Dance, also broadcast on RTL-TVI since 28 June 2015.

She also appeared as a contestant on Fort Boyard in 2017.

== Personal life ==
Corman married in June 2004 the model Xavier Fiams. She gave birth to a son named Oscar in March 2007. She separated of her husband in 2008 because of the importance of her career.

She remarried on 12 September 2014 with Michel Bouhoulle, a tennis teacher and sports consultant. She announced on 11 May 2015 that she was expecting her second child. She gave birth on 3 November 2015 to Harold.

Preceded by Laurence Borremans	Miss Belgium; 1997	Succeeded by Tanja Dexters
