= Bertrand Chameroy =

French television presenter (born 1989)

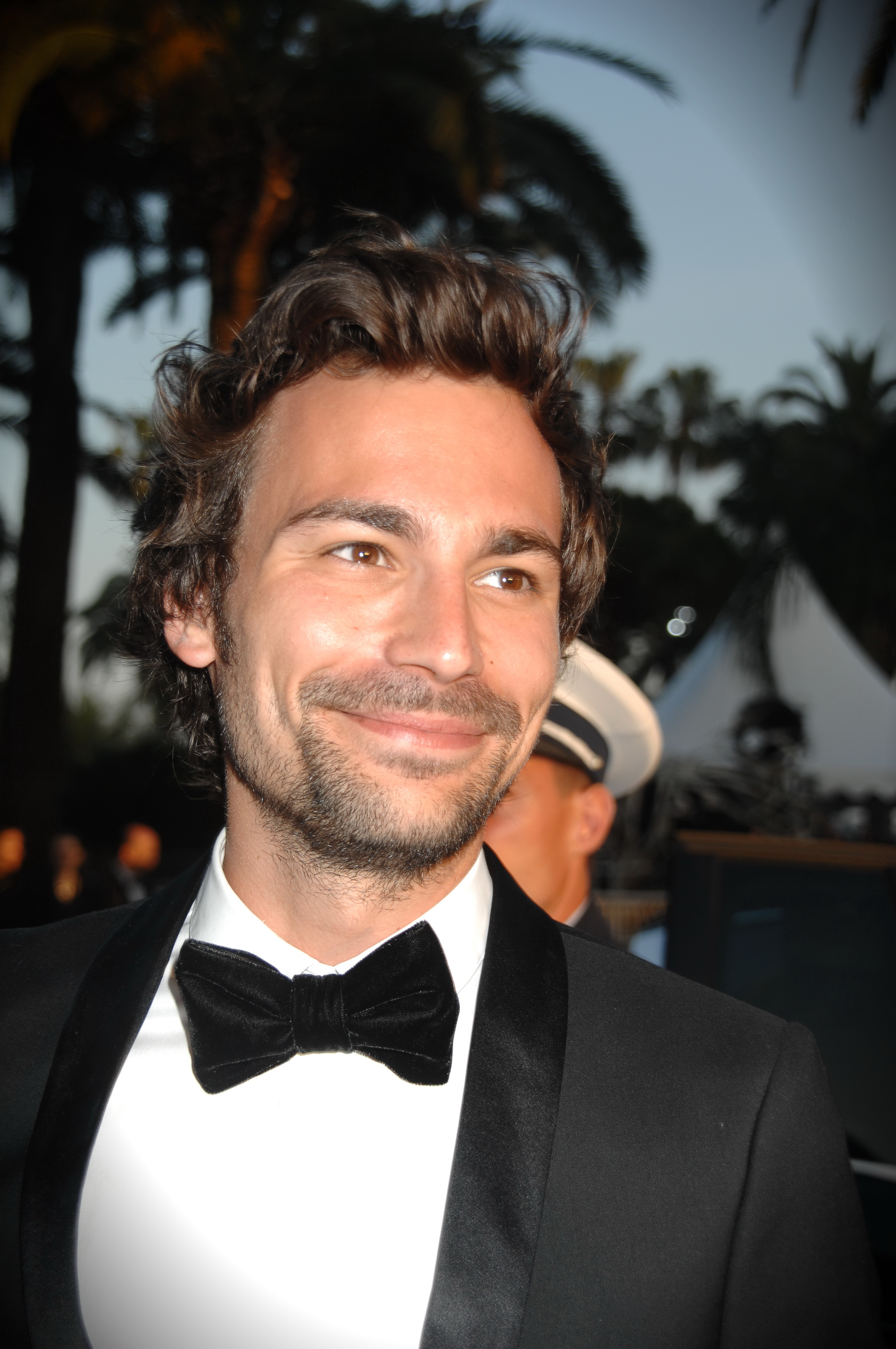
- Chameroy in 2015
- Born: January 28, 1989 (age 37); Nice, France
- Occupations: Radio & television presenter
- Years active: 2009–present
- Employer(s): France Inter; France 2

Bertrand Chameroy (born January 28, 1989) is a French television presenter, columnist and journalist.

== Early life ==
Chameroy was born January 28, 1989, in Nice, France, and grew up in the neighboring commune of Cantaron. He graduated with a degree from the Cannes School of Journalism at the Université Nice-Sophia-Antipolis and began an internship at Le Grand Journal, owned by Canal+.

== Career beginnings ==
In 2009, Chameroy joined Morandini!, which aired on Direct 8, when he was 20 years old. He provided voiceovers for reports and did voice dubbing for foreign clips being translated into French. He made his first onscreen appearance on the show during Le Débrief, where he appeared as a columnist every Monday starting in August 2011. He quickly stood out on the show in part due to his humorous personality.

== Recruitment to D8 ==
In September 2012, Chameroy was scouted by television agent Christelle Graillot, whose organization, Canal+, ended up not using him. He was subsequently recruited by Cyril Hanouna, whose show, Touche pas à mon poste!, was being moved to D8. He made his first appearance on the show on October 8 of that year, hosting the 'La Télé à Cham' portion of the show. The French media ranked it as one of the top three funniest segments.

In the following year, his segment was renamed 'Les News de Cham', and took on a more fast-paced tone. In 2014, it was again renamed to 'Ce qu'il ne fallait pas louper', and broadcast a compulation of gaffes and unexpected moments on television and the internet. It changed again to 'Le Journal de Bertrand Chameroy' and maintained the fast-paced movement of its previous iteration.

On March 8, 2016, he announced that he would be temporarily stepping away from the show due to a lack of enjoyment doing his segment. The announcement came during a period of exposé by Society and the show, with an insider on the show alleging that there was rampant nefarious and uncouth behavior behind the scenes of the show.

Concurrent to his run on the show, Chameroy hosted another show on D8, Le Journal de Bertrand Chameroy, which was a longer-form adaptation of his segment on TPMP. That same year, 2015, he co-hosted Les Pieds dans le plat with Hanouna, Jean-Luc Lemoine, and Valérie Bénaïm on Europe 1.

== Move to W9 ==
On May 26, 2016, only 2 months after Chameroy's departure from D8, GQ France announced that he would start in the fall of 2016 on W9 hosting a weekly show in the latter half of the evening. On September 6, it was announced that he would start on OFNI, l'info reretour on September 27, which would be hosted live and in public. He initially co-presented with Adèle Galloy, and from February 28, 2017 onwards, with Jill Vandermeulen. In September 2016, he stated in an interview that he "no longer felt comfortable with the atmosphere of goofiness that [TPMP] took" and wanted to talk more about news and politics, as opposed to solely making jokes. He claimed that he "cried tears of joy" after resigning, and denied being the insider responsible for speaking to Society magazine.

On March 12, 2017, he presented the Les OFNI Awards de la présidentielle for the 2017 French presidential election, co-hosting with Vandermeulen, making parodies on the various presidential campaigns during the election cycle. In June, the end of the run was announced, with Chameroy presenting the last segment on July 19.

== Europe 1 and C8 ==
Chameroy joined Daphné Bürki in the fall of 2017 to be a contributor on her show, Bonjour la France, which aired on Europe 1. The show only aired for one season and was not renewed. A year later, he returned to D8, which by the time he joined had been renamed C8. That year in 2018, on September 3, he returned to participate in another season of TPMP, hosting a segment called La météo de Bertrand Chameroy, where he presented the weather and did parodies. It was not well-received and was cancelled four days into the air. He appeared on Balance ton post !, another show presented by Hanouna, and announced on September 20 that he would not be appearing in either show in the future.

== France Télévisions and return to radio ==
Following a hiatus, Chameroy returned to the media in 2020 on Europe 1's L'écran de veille with Philippe Vandel. In June 2021, he was part of the morning radio program but was fired following a column attacking Vincent Bolloré during talks of Europe 1 merging with CNews. From October 2020 to June 2021, he presented a column in 6 à la maison, which was presented by Patrick Cohen. Starting on January 5, 2024, he presented Bretrand n'a pas sommeil, which is a talk show in the latter half of the evening on France 2. The show was cancelled the following April.

== Personal life ==
In 2023, Chameroy announced that he had been married for four years.

In January 2025, he stated that he had bee suffering from depression following an absence from television due to a large illness. He has spoken openly about removing the stigma around depression, and came back to air after a twenty-day break and treatment by mental health professionals.
