= Malik Bentalha =

French comedian, actor and screenwriter

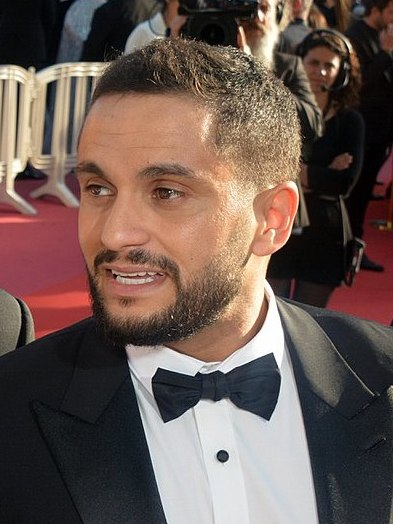
- Bentalha at Cannes Film Festival 2018
- Born: 1 March 1989 (age 36); Bagnols-sur-Cèze, Gard, Occitania, France
- Education: Cours Florent
- Occupation: Humorist
- Notable work: Jamel Comedy Club

Malik Bentalha (French pronunciation: [malik bɛntala], Arabic: مالك بن طلحة; born 1 March 1989 in Bagnols-sur-Cèze) is a French humorist and actor of Algerian and Moroccan descent. He does stand-up comedy and has appeared in films.

== Early life ==
Malik Bentalha studied at the Cours Florent from 2007 to 2008. He started doing sketches in Parisian café-théâtre, such as the Théâtre du Point-Virgule.

== Career ==
In 2010, after Jamel Debbouze noticed him, Malik Bentalha joined the Jamel Comedy Club and was later featured as the opening act for Debbouze's tour, Tout sur Jamel, for two years. He met Gad Elmaleh in Montmartre who asked him to be the opening act for his show at the Palais des Sports the following day. That same year, he was a part of Le meilleur de Paris fait sa comédie on national French television channel France 2.

In 2011 he held a regular segment, Télé Délire, on Le Grand Direct, a radio programme hosted by Jean-Marc Morandini. The segment was held in partnership with Mathieu Madénian at first, and since September 2011 with Benjamin Josse. In 2014, he joined Cyril Hanouna in his radio programme Les pieds dans le plat on Europe 1, with Valérie Bénaïm.

In 2010, he started touring with his first one man show, Malik Bentalha se la raconte, directed by Alex Lutz. In December 2014, a DVD was released. In January 2015, W9 broadcast a live session of his one man show, followed by a TV report, Malik se raconte.

In 2015, he was part of the film Pattaya, directed by Franck Gastambide, in which he held one of the main roles.

He is a godfather for the Theodora Children's Charity.

== Filmography ==
Year	Title	Role	Director	Notes
2011	The Day I Saw Your Heart	A comedian	Jennifer Devoldère	
2011	Insoupçonnable	Policeman	Benoît d'Aubert	TV movie
2013	Eyjafjallajökull	Cécile's friend	Alexandre Coffre	
2013	Né quelque part	Kikim	Mohamed Hamidi	
2013	Scènes de ménages	Patrick	Francis Duquet	TV series (1 episode)
2013	Le débarquement	Various	Renaud Le Van Kim	TV series (1 episode)
2015	Robin des bois, la véritable histoire	Friar Tuck	Anthony Marciano	
2016	Pattaya	Krimo	Franck Gastambide	
2016	La vache	Young commuter	Mohamed Hamidi (2)	
2018	Taxi 5	Eddy Maklouf	Franck Gastambide	
2018	Le doudou	Sofiane	Julien Hervé and Philippe Mechelen	
2020	Sonic the Hedgehog	Sonic	Jeff Fowler	French dub
2022	Sonic the Hedgehog 2	Sonic	Jeff Fowler	French dub

== Television ==
Year	Title	Channel	Notes
2010-2014	Jamel Comedy Club	Canal+	Regular
2010	Le meilleur de Paris fait sa comédie	France 2	Television special
2012	Stand Up TV	Comédie+	
2013, 2014	Marrakech du rire	M6	Humour festival Television special
2013	La Parenthèse inattendue	France 2	
2014	N'oubliez pas les paroles!	France 2	With Élodie Gossuin; Contestant
2014	L'Œuf ou la Poule ?	D8	Season 2, episode 1 Contestant
2014	Qui veut gagner des millions ?	TF1	With Ramzy Bédia; Contestant
2015	Malik Bentalha se la Raconte	W9	One man show Live from the Bataclan
2015	Malik se raconte	W9	TV report
2015	CQFD ! Ce qu'il fallait détourner	D8	

=== Guest ===
Year	Title	Channel	Notes
2011, 2015	Le Grand Journal	Canal+	Talk show
2011, 2014	Vivement dimanche	France 2	Talk show
2013-2015	Touche pas à mon poste!	D8	Talk show Guest several times
2013-2015	Le Grand 8	D8	Talk show Guest several times
2014	Vendredi tout est permis avec Arthur	TF1	Regular
2014	Salut les Terriens !	Canal+	Talk show
2015	Le 19:45	M6	News broadcasting
2015	C'est au programme	France 2	
2015	Le Before du Grand Journal	Canal+	
