= À prendre ou à laisser =

French game show

À prendre ou à laisser (Take it or leave it) was the French version of the television game show Deal or No Deal. It was premiered on 12 January 2004 on TF1. It was originally hosted by Arthur, the former vice-president of Endemol France and a popular radio presenter.

There were 22 boxes representing the 22 regions of France at the time, with each contestant coming from that region. The prizes range from €0.01 to €500,000 and usually three "joke" prizes (e.g. a cup or a coat hanger) and a "joker", containing an amount determined by the number of contestants who answer the "selection question" correctly. The "joker" is €10,000 (sometimes €30,000) multiplied by the number of correct answers.

There has been at least seven winners of the €500,000 prize. On 17 July 2004, Pascal Olmeta dealt at €620,000 after eliminating all the boxes except for the €1,000,000 box and a box which contains the CD. He had the latter in his box. It is always considered as "l'affaire du siècle" (deal of the century).

Other factors particular to the French version are that the prize is shared with a viewer who has phoned in to enter the competition and that offers of an "échange" (change of box) are fairly frequent.

In 2006, the graphics were changed to be more similar to the American version. The top prize was raised to €1,000,000, and the number of boxes was raised to 24. The number of French regions stated on the opening titles was also 24, two more people representing an overseas department (départements d'outre-mer) and an ex-pat. Alongside revised graphics, the set was also heavily revamped.

After the primetime version was axed in late 2006, it was re-commissioned on 5 January 2009 and the prize was lowered back to €500,000, with a new graphics and music being similar to the United States syndicated version and the set being similar to the UK version. It now has a 45-minute slot at 6:30 pm (French hour) every weekday. The show still has 24 boxes, keeping some of the larger prize boxes. Since its comeback, A prendre ou à laisser has had only one €500,000 winner. On 23 January 2009, Marie-Ange had a €500,000 box and she refused all banker's offers (until €210,000).

The last season of the show on TF1 started on 12 April 2010 and ended on 3 June 2010.

A short-lived reboot of the show hosted by Julien Courbet aired on C8 in 2014 and 2015, with the top prize lowered to €100,000. In 2020, the show returned with Cyril Hanouna hosting and a top prize of €250,000. Later in the year, this became a rolling jackpot increasing by €10,000 each time it wasn't won. He was replaced by Christophe Dechavanne for the final series of the revival in 2021.

== Boards ==
=== TF1 era ===
*: may be replaced by joke prizes

12-24 January 2004		27 Jan - 9 Jul 2004		Summer 2004 (primetime)		3 Jan - 23 Dec 2005		2 Jan - 2 Jun 2006 (daytime)		4 Sept - 22 Dec 2006 (primetime)		5 Jan - 24 Apr 2009		12 Apr - 3 Jun 2010	
€0.01	€1,000	€0.01	€5,000	€0.01	€5,000	€0.01	€10,000	€0.01	€15,000	€0.01	€15,000	€0.01	€10,000	€0.01	€10,000
€0.20*	€5,000	€0.20*	€10,000	€0.20*	€10,000	€0.50*	€15,000	Object	€20,000	€1	€20,000	Object	€15,000	€1	€15,000
€0.50*	€10,000	€0.50*	€15,000	€0.50*	€15,000	€1*	€20,000	€5	€25,000	€5	€25,000	€5	€20,000	Object	€20,000
€1*	€15,000	€1*	€20,000	€1*	€20,000	€5*	€25,000	Object	€30,000	€10	€30,000	Object	€25,000	€10	€25,000
€5*	€20,000	€5*	€25,000	€5*	€25,000	€10*	€30,000	€20	€50,000	€15	€50,000	€15	€30,000	Object	€30,000
€10*	€25,000	€10*	€30,000	€10*	€30,000	€20*	Joker	Object	Joker	€20	€75,000	Object	€35,000	€20	€50,000
€20	€50,000	€20	€50,000	€20	€50,000	€50	€50,000	€100	€75,000	€50	€100,000	€50	€75,000	Object	€75,000
€50	€75,000	€50	€75,000	€50	€75,000	€100	€75,000	€250	€100,000	€100	€150,000	€100	€100,000	€100	€100,000
€100	€100,000	€100	€100,000	€100	€100,000	€250	€100,000	€500	€150,000	€250	€200,000	€250	€150,000	€250	€150,000
€250	€250,000	€250	€250,000	€250	€250,000	€500	€250,000	€5,000	€250,000	€500	€300,000	€500	€200,000	€500	€200,000
€500	€500,000	€500	€500,000	€500	€1,000,000	€5,000	€500,000	€10,000	€500,000	€5,000	€500,000	€1,000	€250,000	€1,000	€250,000
N/A		N/A		€1,000	N/A	N/A		N/A		€10,000	€1,000,000	€5,000	€500,000	€5,000	€500,000

From 2005 to 2006, there was one Joker box. Its value depended on correct answers: if a contestant answered correctly, €10,000 was added into the Joker box. Thus, if all 22 contestants gave the correct answers, the Joker box was worth €220,000. On some occasions, each correct answer was worth €30,000, that could result in a €660,000 box.

On a special edition on 2 June 2006, a correct answer was worth €50,000, which could have boosted the value of the Joker box to €1,100,000. However, there were only four correct answers, so the Joker was worth €200,000 on that episode.

== Revival ==
A revival of the show was premièred on 8 October 2014 on D8. It is hosted by Julien Courbet. The first season ended on 5 December 2014. The second season started on 31 August 2015 and ended on 30 October 2015.

=== Board ===
2014		2015		18 May - 18 Jun 2020		31 Aug 2020 - 25 Jun 2021	
Object	Jackpot	Object	€1,000	Object	€1,000	Object	€1,000
€0.05	€2,000	€0.05	€2,000	€0.05	€1,500	€0.05	€1,500
€0.10	€3,000	€0.10	€3,000	€0.10	€3,000	€0.10	€3,000
€0.50*	€4,000	€0.50*	€4,000	€0.50*	€4,000	€0.50*	€4,000
€1*	€5,000	€1*	€5,000	€1*	€5,000	€1*	€5,000
€5	€7,500	€5	€7,500	€5	€10,000	€5	€10,000
€10	€10,000	€10	€10,000	€10	€15,000	€10	€15,000
€25	€15,000	€25	€15,000	€25	€20,000	€25	€20,000
€50	€20,000	€50	€20,000	€50	€30,000	€50	€30,000
€100	€25,000	€100	€25,000	€100	€50,000	€100	€50,000
€250	€50,000	€250	€50,000	€250	€100,000	€250	€100,000
€500	€100,000	€500	€100,000	€500	€250,000	€500	Top prize

The jackpot prize starts at €1,000 and increases by €500 for each time it is not won as a bonus by opening the box containing it within the first three picks. In 2014, it could also be won if it is in the contestant's box and it is not sold. In 2015, if it is not found in the first three picks, it is replaced with an object prize.

Since 31 August 2020, the top prize is replaced by another jackpot, which starts at €250,000 and increases by €5,000 for each time it is not won.

At the end of each game, the contestant is asked if he or she wishes to buy the 25th box (25^{ème} boîte) for the amount already won on the show (except for the jackpot).

In 2014, the box contains one of three cards:

- €0: The contestant wins nothing.
- =: The contestant's winnings remain unchanged.
- ×2: The contestant's winnings are doubled.

In 2015, the "=" is replaced with two new possibilities:

- ÷2: The contestant's winnings are halved.
- +€1000: €1,000 is added to the contestant's winnings.

The banker also proposes a 3rd type of offer: the comeback, where the contestant can return into the game after accepting a money offer.

== Seasons ==
Host	Channel	Season	Start date	End date	Episodes
Arthur	TF1	1	12 January 2004	9 April 2004	55
Arthur	TF1	2	21 June 2004	28 August 2004	41 + 8 specials
Arthur	TF1	3	3 January 2005	29 April 2005	75
Arthur	TF1	4	5 September 2005	2 June 2006	165
Arthur	TF1	5	4 September 2006	22 December 2006	80
Arthur	TF1	6	5 January 2009	24 April 2009	80
Arthur	TF1	7	12 April 2010	3 June 2010	39
Julien Courbet	D8	8	8 October 2014	5 December 2014	41
Julien Courbet	D8	9	31 August 2015	30 October 2015	39 + 2 specials
Cyril Hanouna	C8	10	18 May 2020	18 June 2020	19 + 1 special
Cyril Hanouna	C8	11	31 August 2020	18 February 2021	97
Christophe Dechavanne	C8	12	14 June 2021	25 June 2021	10
