= Camille Combal =

French television and radio presenter (born 1981)

- Combal during ZEVENT 2026
- Born: 18 September 1981 (age 45); Gap, Hautes-Alpes, France
- Education: Aix-Marseille University
- Presenting career
- Show: Touche pas à mon poste !; Danse avec les stars; Mask Singer; Qui veut gagner des millions ?; Une famille en or
- Network: Fun Radio; NRJ; Virgin Radio; Canal+; W9; M6; C8; TF1
- Country: France

Camille Combal (born 18 September 1981) is a French television and radio presenter. He is the current host of Danse avec les stars, Mask Singer, Qui veut gagner des millions ?, and Une famille en or. He was the co-host of Touche pas à mon poste ! for six seasons.

== Personal life ==
Combal was born on 18 September 1981 in Gap, Hautes-Alpes. He went to primary school in Les Orres, and secondary school in Embrun. He studied management at Aix-Marseille University. In 2019, he married Marie in Aix-en-Provence.

== Career ==
In 2006, Combal started as an intern at Fun Radio. In 2007, he replaced Manu Payet at NRJ, working alongside Bruno Guillon and Florian Gazan. In 2008, he joined Virgin Radio, hosting their morning programme alongside Sébastien Cauet. He worked at Virgin Radio until June 2018, when he left to join TF1.

In 2008, Combal also began presenting the Canal+ programme L'édition spéciale. In 2009, Combal joined TV channel W9, and in 2010, he joined M6, working alongside Estelle Denis. He presented the C8 talkshow Touche pas à mon poste ! alongside Cyril Hanouna, before leaving the show in 2018 after six seasons. He also hosted one series of Il en pense quoi Camille ? between 2016 and 2017.

Combal has been the presenter of TF1 programme Danse avec les stars since season 9. Since 2019, he has presented Mask Singer, and Qui veut gagner des millions ?, the French version of Who Wants to Be a Millionaire?. As part of the handover for Qui veut gagner des millions ?, the 2019 series started with a celebrity special hosted by Jean-Pierre Foucault in which Combal was a contestant. He also hosts his own show, Plan C, which uses carpool karaoke. During the COVID-19 pandemic, Combal hosted episodes of Qui veut gagner des millions ? from his living room. In 2020, Combal became the presenter of Une famille en or, a French adaption of the American gameshow Family Feud and the British gameshow Family Fortunes.

== Awards ==
In 2015, Combal was second in the TV Notes award for best presenter, for his work on Touche pas à mon poste !, with 799,000 votes. He won the 2016 TV Notes award for best presenter.
