= Yannick Bolloré =

French businessman (born 1980)

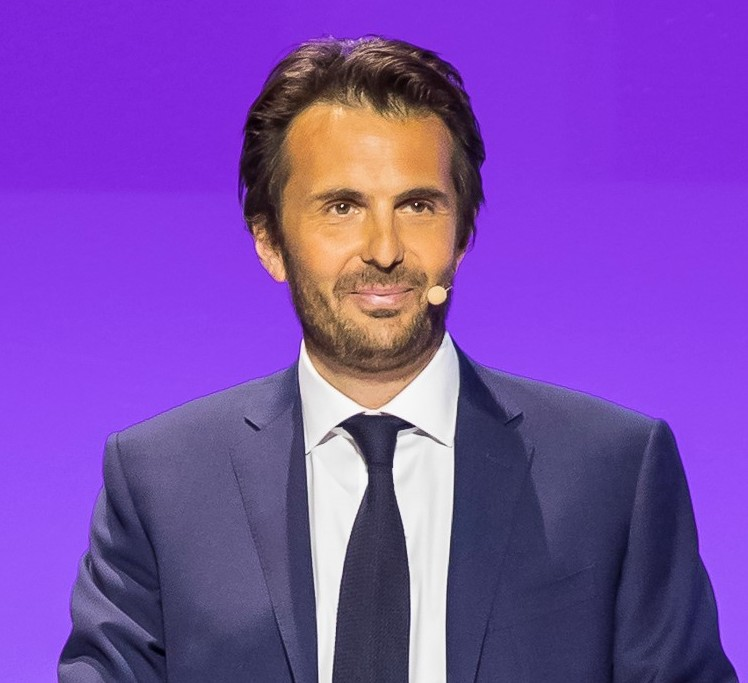
- Born: 1 February 1980 (age 46); Paris, France
- Education: Paris Dauphine University, Saint-Jean de Passy
- Occupations: Chairman and CEO, Havas Chairman of the Supervisory Board, Vivendi
- Spouse: Chloé Bouygues (m. 2006)
- Parent: Vincent Bolloré
- Family: Bolloré family

Yannick Bolloré (born 1 February 1980) is a French businessman. As of 2020 he was the chairman and CEO of Havas, the fifth largest global communications company, and chairman of the supervisory board of Vivendi, a global investment company whose majority shareholder is the family-controlled Bolloré Group chaired by his brother Cyrille Bolloré and his father, Vincent Bolloré.

== Personal life and education ==
Bolloré was born on 1 February 1980 at the American Hospital of Paris in Neuilly-sur-Seine, France. He was educated at the Lycée Jean-Baptiste-Say and Saint-Jean de Passy. He is a graduate of Paris-Dauphine University where he studied audiovisual communications. In 2006, Bolloré married Chloé Bouygues, niece of Martin Bouygues, with whom he has three daughters.

== Career ==
Having begun a DESS (French university degree) in audio-visual communication, Bolloré founded film production company WY Productions along with Wassim Béji in 2002.

In July 2006, he joined Bolloré Group chaired by his father Vincent, as programs director of Direct 8. The TV channel achieved the highest audience growth of any French television channel at the time thanks to the broadcast of the matches of the French women's football team and the creation of the popular Touche pas à mon poste! program presented by Cyril Hanouna. From September 2009 to September 2010, he was CEO of Bolloré Média, which includes TV channel Direct 8, the free paper Direct Matin (largest daily paper in France with over one million circulation) and Direct Soir, the Bolloré Intermédia advertising network, and opinion pollster CSA. In March 2010, he purchased the Virgin 17 television channel from Lagardère and in September relaunched it under a new brand Direct Star. Between October 2009 and June 2010, he founded several companies including Havas Productions, H2O Productions and Direct Cinéma, a joint film production company.

Yannick Bolloré was appointed vice-president of Havas in March 2011. In September 2011, he signed a deal to sell the television business of Bolloré Média, which had become the no. 3 private radio and TV broadcaster in France, to Canal+ Group for close to €465 million in exchange for Vivendi shares, which makes Bolloré Group the largest Vivendi shareholder.

He was appointed chairman and CEO of the Havas Group in August 2013. In July 2017, the Vivendi group acquired Bolloré Group's majority stake in Havas.

As of 2020 he was the chairman and chief executive officer (CEO) of Havas.

Yannick Bolloré has been a director of Bolloré Participations since 1998, Bolloré since 2009, Havas since 2010 and the Rodin Museum since 2015. He has been a member of the influential club Le Siècle.

== Awards and honours ==
- Young Global Leader at the World Economic Forum (2008)
- B'nai Brith Gold Medal, for having "illustrated and defended the individual and universal values of ethics and philosophical and religious morals" (2010)
- Chevalier de l'Ordre des arts et lettres de la République française (Knight of the Order of Arts and Letters of the French Republic) (2012)
