= Adam Zkt. Eva =

Dutch reality television show (2014–2018)

- Genre: reality television dating show
- Presented by: Nicolette Kluijver
- Theme music composer: Martijn Schimmer
- Country of origin: Netherlands
- Original language: Dutch

Production
- Production company: Reinout Oerlemans

Original release
- Network: RTL 5
- Release: March 4, 2014 – October 10, 2018

Adam Zkt. Eva (Adam zoekt Eva, Dutch for Adam seeks Eve) is a Dutch reality television relationship show produced by Reinout Oerlemans which first aired in 2014, on RTL 5. The show's novelty is that all participants are naked, with an additional twist in that a second candidate (also naked) is introduced halfway through the program to compete for the main character's affections. Presenter and former model Nicolette Kluijver, who left BNN, hosts the program. Season 1 of the show contained 8 episodes, and was shot in the Pacific Ocean, on Mogo Mogo Island of the Pearl Islands, Panama. Season 2 also contained 8 episodes, and was shot on Matinloc Island, Palawan, the Philippines.

Because of its depiction of nudity the show attracted controversy. A reviewer for de Volkskrant was not impressed and called it just another dating show (instead of the advertised "unique love experiment"). Tweets by Dutch TV personalities expressed mainly surprise.

Dennis Weening presented the first season of Adam Zkt. Eva VIPS, a season of the show with celebrities. Marieke Elsinga presented the second season of Adam Zkt. Eva VIPS.

== International versions ==
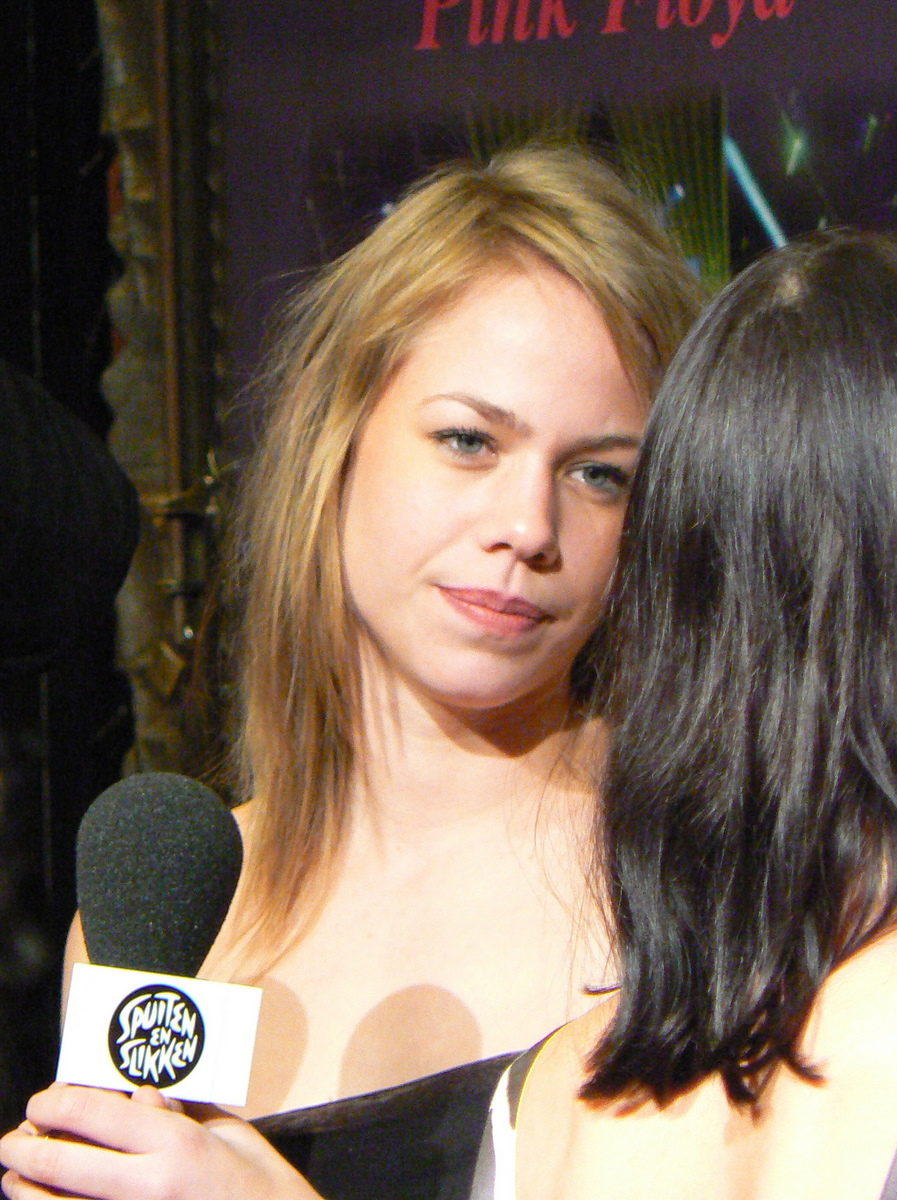
Adam Zkt. Eva host Nicolette Kluijver in 2008

The format has been sold to producers in various European countries.

A Spanish version Adán y Eva, shot in Croatia and hosted by Mónica Martínez, premiered on Cuatro on 21 October 2014. The show was renewed for a second season, which was shot in the Philippines.

The German adaptation Adam sucht Eva premiered on 28 August 2014 on RTL Television. The six episodes of the first season were shot on Tikehau and hosted by Nela Lee.

A French version Adam recherche Ève premiered on 3 March 2015 on D8 and hosted by Caroline Ithurbide.

A Danish version Adam og Eva shot in Greece started to air on 21 January 2015 on TV3.

A Finnish adaptation Aatami etsii Eevaa also shot in Greece premiered on 6 April 2015 on Nelonen.

DeeJay TV produced in autumn 2015 the Italian version as L'isola di Adamo ed Eva, with Vladimir Luxuria as host.

Hungarian Ádám keresi Évát was broadcast in eight episodes on Viasat 3 from April 25 to June 10, 2016.

Portuguese Adão e Eva was broadcast in eight episodes on the SIC Radical Portuguese channel from April 2016.

Region/Country	Name	Channel	Premiere	Presenter(s)
Germany	Adam sucht Eva	RTL	28 August 2014	Nela Lee
Spain	Adán y Eva	Cuatro	21 October 2014	Mónica Martínez
Denmark	Adam og Eva	TV3	21 January 2015	Julie Zangenberg
France	Adam recherche Ève	D8	3 March 2015	Caroline Ithurbide
Finland	Aatami etsii Eevaa	Nelonen	6 April 2015	Noora Hautakangas
Norway	Adam søker Eva	TVNorge	17 September 2015	?
Italy	L'isola di Adamo ed Eva	Deejay TV	7 October 2015	Vladimir Luxuria
Hungary	Ádám keresi Évát	Viasat 3	25 April 2016	?

== Voice overs and subtitles ==
The original Dutch version with a Polish voice-over titled Adam szuka Ewy (Polish for Adam seeks Eve) debuted on Polish TLC on February 3, 2015.

The original Dutch version along with German version with a Slovak voice-over titled Nahí v raji (Slovak for Naked in paradise) debuted on TV JOJ in 2014.

The original Dutch version with English subtitles began broadcasting in Australia on SBS2 on 13 March 2015 as "Adam Looking for Eve", and was rebroadcast starting in May 2016.

The original Dutch version with Portuguese subtitles began broadcasting in Portugal on SIC Radical in April 2016 as "Adam Looking for Eve", with the second season being broadcast in May.

== See also ==
- Dating Naked, an American naked dating show
