= Valérie Bénaïm =

Moroccan-born French journalist, columnist, writer, TV presenter and radio host

- Years active: 1990–present

Valerie Anna Benaim (French pronunciation: [valeʁi benaim]; Arabic: فاليري بنعيم) is a Moroccan-born French journalist, columnist, writer, TV Presenter and radio host. She was born on August 30, 1969, in Casablanca in Morocco.

In 2015, Benaim was elected 2nd Favourite columnist with 37% of the way in a TV poll, behind Anne-Élisabeth Lemoine.

In 2016, she became the godmother of the association Juste Humain.

== Personal life ==
Valerie Benaim is the daughter of insurance professionals, she moved with her family to France at the age of four, settling in the Paris region. She spent her childhood in Le Chesnay, in the Yvelines department, with her younger brother, Laurent.

In 1999, Valerie Benaim married producer Olivier Hallé, with whom she had a son called Tom. Laurent Fontaine, a French TV producer, served as a witness at the wedding before they finally separated. Since 2012, she has been in a relationship with Patrice, an executive at a communication company.

On January 14, 2026, on the set of the TV show Le Prime des Vérités broadcast on W9, she announced that she has a neurodegenerative condition affecting her ear, which has caused partial hearing loss.

== Television ==
Year	TV show	Role	Channel	Notes
1995	Cinémascope	Host	MCM	
1998	La Culture Aussi	Host (replacement)	La Chaîne Info	
1997-1999	Y'a pas photo	Columnist & then Host	TF1	
1999	Photos de vacances	Co-Host	TF1	
1999	Millenium	Host	TF1	
1999-2000	En direct ce soir	Co-Host	TF1	
2000-2001	Célébrités	Co-Host	TF1	
2001	Le journal de la culture	Host	La Chaîne Info	
1999-2002	Défense d'entrer	Co-Host	TF1	
2001-2002	Exclusif	Co-Host	TF1	with Frédéric Joly
2002	L'émission des records	Host	TF1	
2002-2003	Personne n'est parfait	Co-Host	TF1	
2003	Les enfants de la télé	Guest	TF1	with Arthur
2003-2004	Les 100 plus grands...	Co-Host	TF1	with Christophe Dechavanne
2004	Who Wants to Be a Millionaire?	Guest	TF1	with Jean-Pierre Foucault
2004	Le Grand Journal	Guest	Canal +	with Michel Denisot
2004	J'y vais... j'y vais pas ?	Host	France 3	
2005	Jules et les Filles	Host	France 3	
2005	Le Grand Journal	Guest	Canal +	with Michel Denisot
2007	La Grande Illusion	Host	France 3	
2008	Le Grand Journal	Guest	Canal +	with Michel Denisot
2008	On n'est pas couché	Guest	France 2	with Laurent Ruquier
2008	Culture VIP	Host	Direct 8	
2008-2009	Morandini !	Columnist	Direct 8	with Jean-Marc Morandini
2010	L'instant T	Host	13th Street Universal	
2010	Face à l'étrange	Host	Virgin 17	
2012	Quand on n'a que l'humour	Host	TV5 Monde	with David Saada
2013	Le Grand Concours des animateurs	Guest	TF1	with Carole Rousseau; Go in Final but lost versus Estelle Denis
2013	Mag pour le Salon international de l'agriculture	Host	Terre d'infos	
2013	Est-ce que ça marche ?	Host (replacement)	D8	with Camille Combal
2013	On chante tous Disney	Host	D8	with Camille Combal
2013	2013 au Poste	Host	D8	with Énora Malagré
2013–2014	Maîtres de l'humour	Host	D8	
2014	Globes de Cristal Award	Host	D17	
2014	Domino Day	Host	D8	
2014	Les animaux du poste	Host	D8	with Jean-Luc Lemoine
2014	Weakest Link	Guest	D8	with Julien Courbet; Go in Final but lost versus Laurence Ferrari
2015	2015 au poste	Host	D8	
2012–present	Touche pas à mon poste!	Columnist (sometimes Host)	D8	with Cyril Hanouna
2015–2016	Le Grand Match	Host	D8	
2017	Dites-le à Baba !	Co-Host	C8	
2017	Qui sera le génie de la Recup ?	Host	C8	
2017	Les enquêtes de TPMP !	Host	C8	

== Radio ==
Year	Show	Radio	Notes
1993-1997	Bulletins d'informations	Fun Radio	with Sébastien Cauet
2000-2001	Éclats de Vie	RTL	
2002-2004	Planète Arthur	Fun Radio	with Arthur and Emmanuel Levy
2007	La Matinale	Chérie FM	with Alexandre Debanne
2010	On va s'gêner	Europe 1	with Laurent Ruquier
2013–2016	Les pieds dans le plat	Europe 1	with Cyril Hanouna

== Bibliography ==
Year	Book	Notes
2005	La Rose de Stalingrad	written with Jean-Claude Hallé
2009	Carla Bruni-Sarkozy, la véritable histoire	written with Yves Azéroual

== Theater ==
Year	Title	Author	Director	Notes
2012	Les Aventures de Tolu, le petit écolo	Karen Taïeb	Katia Lewkowicz	Petit Théâtre des Variétés
