= Marc Menant =

French writer and journalist

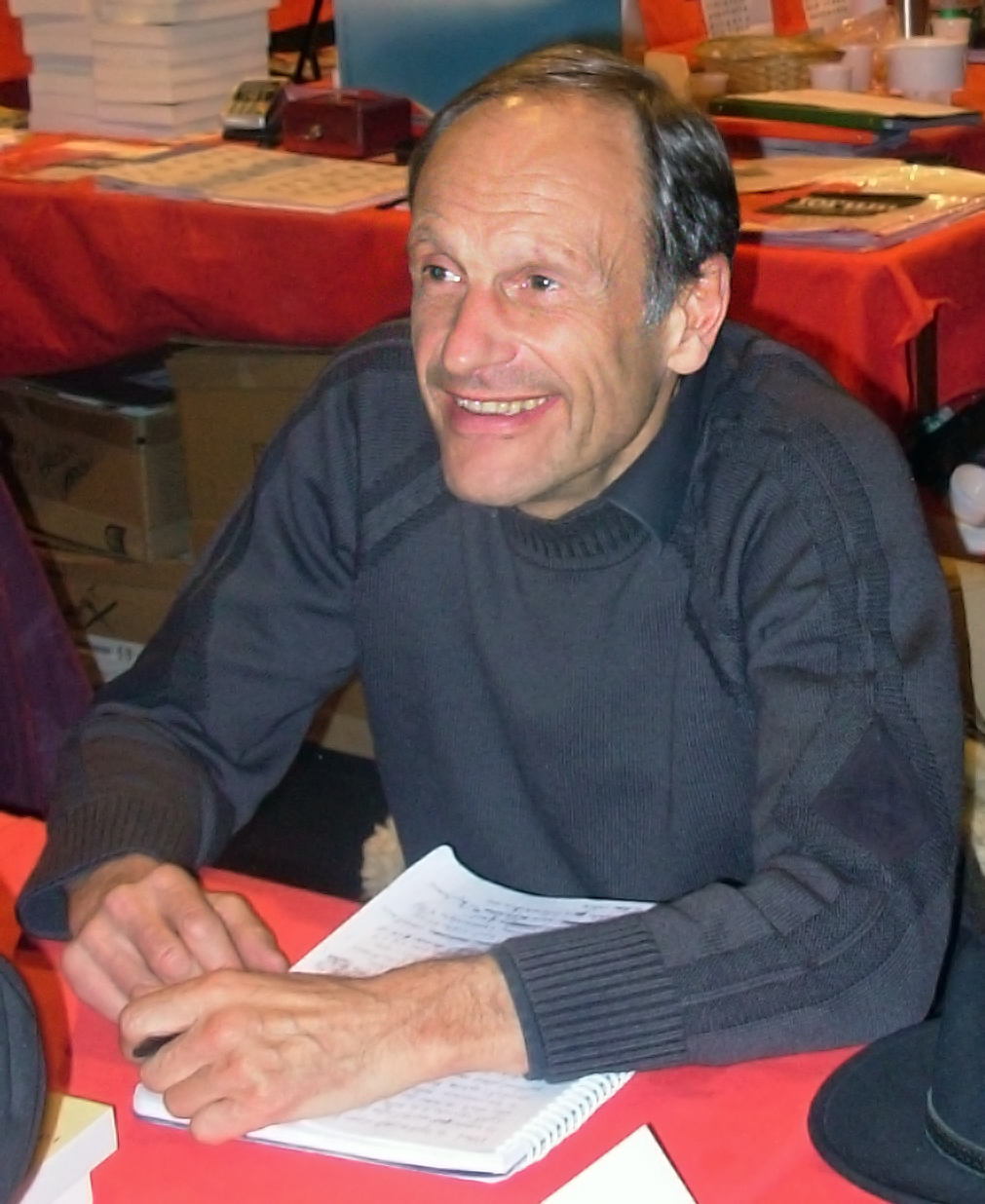
- Marc Menant at a book signing in 2007
- Born: 11 February 1944 (age 81); Hardricourt, Yvelines, France
- Occupation: Journalist
- Employer(s): Direct 8 BFM TV; CNews

Marc Menant (born 11 February 1944) is a French writer and journalist.

== Biography ==
Menant began his career as a sports reporter for RTL. He then joined TF1 and Antenne 2, where he hosted the show Les Jeux de 20 heures and was the weather presenter for Antenne 2's News Channel. From 1997 until 2008, he worked as a Europe 1.

Since 2008, Menant has been a radio host on Direct 8. In addition, he is also currently hosts the show Partageons nos idées on BFM TV.

== Radio ==
- Since 2014 : Les pieds dans le plat on Europe 1
- Since 2019 : Face à l'info on CNews
