= Enora =

Enora or Énora is a Breton female given name. Notable people with the name include:

- Enora Latuillière (born 1992), French biathlete
- Énora Malagré (born 1980), French columnist and radio and television presenter
- Énora Villard (born 1993), French professional squash player
