= Chameroy =

French surname

Chameroy is a surname of French origin. It is derived from the French commune of the same name.

Notable figures with the surname include:

- Bertrand Chameroy (born 1989), French television presenter
- Dan Chameroy (born 1970), Canadian actor
- Marie-Adrienne Chameroy (1779–1802), French ballet dancer
