= Les pieds dans le plat =

- Running time: 2'30
- Country of origin: France
- Hosted by: Cyril Hanouna; Valérie Bénaïm; Jean-Luc Lemoine
- Created by: Cyril Hanouna
- Original release: 26 August 2013 – 9 June 2016
- No. of seasons: 3
- No. of episodes: 624
- Website: http://www.europe1.fr/

Les pieds dans le plat is a French radio show broadcast on Europe 1 which covers news and media reporting. Hosted by Cyril Hanouna, the show is broadcast from Monday to Friday at 4:00 PM.

== Columnists ==
Columnists	Seasons		
Columnists	1	2	3
Valérie Bénaïm			
Pierre Bellemare			
Jean-Luc Lemoine			
Géraldine Maillet			
Jean-Pierre Foucault			
Jean-Marie Bigard			
Olivier de Kersauson			
Roselyne Bachelot			
Marc Menant			
Gilles Verdez			
Jérôme Commandeur			
Malik Bentalha			
Laurent Guimier			
Jérémy Ferrari			
Christophe Bourseiller			
Patrice Leconte			
Estelle Denis			
Sandrine Quétier			
Anggun			
Jean-François Cayrey			

== Guests ==
The show received several guest like Michel Sardou, Francis Huster, François Berléand, Mathilde Seigner, Éric-Emmanuel Schmitt, Nicoletta, Sandrine Kiberlain, Gilles Lellouche, Maxime Le Forestier, Juliette, Jean-Michel Cohen, Daniel Auteuil, Richard Berry, Amanda Lear, Nana Mouskouri, Patrick Chesnais, Gérard Jugnot, Élie Semoun, Valérie Bonneton, Samuel Le Bihan, Arielle Dombasle, Sylvie Vartan, Claire Keim, Pierre Palmade, Philippe Geluck, Franck Dubosc, Jacques Weber, Marc Lavoine, Laurent Baffie, Natalie Dessay, Alizée, José Garcia, Michel Fugain, Dave, Olivia Ruiz, Marion Bartoli, Eddy Mitchell, Bernard Menez, Zazie, Lorànt Deutsch, Gérald de Palmas, Alexandre Jardin, Guillaume Gallienne, Igor and Grichka Bogdanoff, Garou, Denise Fabre, Vincent Delerm, Michèle Laroque, Laurent Voulzy, François-Xavier Demaison, Charles Aznavour, Françoise Fabian, Rachida Brakni, Valérie Lemercier, Laurent Ruquier, Jenifer, Pascal Obispo, Grand Corps Malade, Géraldine Nakache, Pierre Perret, Laurent Lafitte, Pierre Niney, Alexandra Lamy, Josiane Balasko, Patrick Fiori, Anne Roumanoff, Muriel Robin, Francis Lalanne...

== Historical ==
The show started 26 August 2013. The first season was broadcast the morning from 10h30 to 12h30. Then, Laurent Ruquier left Europe 1 for RTL and the show take the afternoon place, broadcast from 16h00 to 18h30 with 30 minutes add.
