= Caroline Ithurbide =

French journalist and television presenter

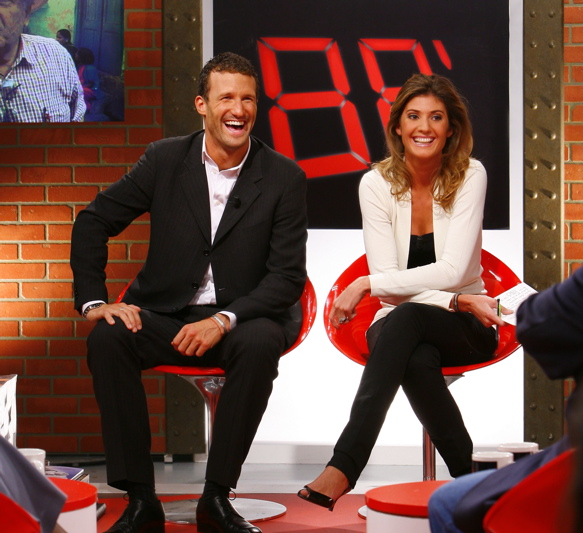
- Ithurbide with Boris Ehrgott on the set of 88 minutes, January 2008.
- Born: 21 July 1979 (age 46); Paris, France
- Occupation: TV host
- Spouse: Polo Anid (m. 2022)
- Partner: Boris Ehrgott
- Children: 2

Caroline Ithurbide (born 21 July 1979) is a French journalist and television presenter.

== Early career ==
After a double MA in Communication and Foreign Languages, Ithurbide worked as a writer for magazines such as Citizen K, Vogue and Vogue Hommes.

== Television ==
In March 2005, Ithurbide was invited by Vincent Bolloré and Philippe Labro to join the channel Direct 8.

In 2015, she appeared as a panellist on the series Touche pas à mon poste!

== Private Life ==
Caroline Ithurbide met the presenter Boris Ehrgott in the show 88 minutes, on Direct 8 in 2005, with whom she had two children, Gaspard Ruben (born in 2008) and Ambre Lilah (born in 2011). Now separated from the father of her children, she has been in a relationship with actor Polo Anid since 2020. On June 10, 2022, in her first wedding, she married him in Paris.
