= Gilles Verdez =

French journalist, television and radio columnist

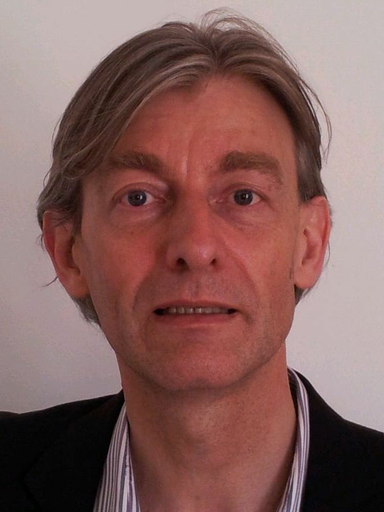
- Born: 8 August 1964 (age 62); Saint-Germain-en-Laye, France
- Education: Centre de formation des journalistes
- Occupation: Journalist
- Writing career
- Language: French
- Genre: non-fiction
- Subject: sports
- Notable awards: Prix de littérature politique Edgar-Faure

Gilles Verdez (born 8 August 1964 in Saint-Germain-en-Laye) is a French journalist, television and radio columnist. He is the co-author of books about football in France and also French politics.

== Biography ==
After graduating from the Centre de formation des journalistes de Paris in 1988, Gilles started his journalism career at "Le Parisien". On 5 May 1992, Gilles went to the Armand Cesari Stadium in the city of Furiani, Corsica, and was one of the wounded. In September 2009, when he was editor at "Le Parisien", he was dismissed by General Director Jean Hornain along with the chief editor Dominique de Montvalon and the editor Phulippe Duley. This happened due to decreasing sales of 4%.

In November 2009, he became deputy sales director of "France-Soir", and then sports department director from August 2011 to January 2012.

As a chronicler of the show we remade the game, on RTL, I-TV, and RFI, and author of five books on football, he was a reporter for "L'Équipe".

He joined the show "Touche pas à mon poste!" as a columnist during 2013–2014, 2014-2015, and 2015–2016 seasons, and teamed up with Cyril Hanouna in broadcasting Feet in the flat on the radio station Europe 1. He appears regularly on CNews.

== Awards ==
- Prix de littérature politique Edgar-Faure en 2013 pour Le Conquistador : Manuel Valls, les secrets d'un destin

Proposal

In February 2017, Gilles Verdez publicly proposed to his girlfriend, Fatou, during Touche Pas à Mon Poste (TPMP) TV show. After expressing multiple reasons that made him loving her, he asked her to marry him. Her reaction, or rather the lack of it, created a media storm.

== Television ==
- Since 2013: Touche pas à mon poste ! (D8) : columnist

== Publications ==
- Les années Jacquet, with Vanessa Caffin, éditions Solar, 1999.
- Les années Lemerre, with Vanessa Caffin, éditions Solar, 2001.
- Le roman noir des bleus, avec Eugène Saccomano, éditions de La Martinière, 2010.
- Verdez, Gilles; Suc, Matthieu (29 September 2011). La face cachée de Franck Ribéry. éditions du Moment. ISBN 978-2354171261.
- Hermant, Arnaud; Verdez, Gilles (24 January 2013). Le PSG, le Qatar et l'argent : l'enquête interdite. éditions du Moment. ISBN 978-2354171933.
- Ramsay, Arnaud; Verdez, Gilles (17 April 2014). Champions du monde 98 : secrets et pouvoir. éditions du Moment. ISBN 978-2354172886.
- Hennen, Jacques; Verdez, Gilles (30 April 2014). Le Conquistador : Manuel Valls, les secrets d'un destin. éditions du Moment. ISBN 978-2354173258.
- Allez le PSG !, avec Eugène Saccomano et Gervais, Pat a Pan éditions, 2013.
- Verdez, Gilles; Evin, Guillaume (2 April 2015). Les Vipères du foot. éditions du Moment. ISBN 978-2354173746.
- Gilles Verdez et Jacques Hennen, Le système Benzema, éditions Mazarine, 2 mars 2016
