= Jean-Luc Lemoine =

French comedian

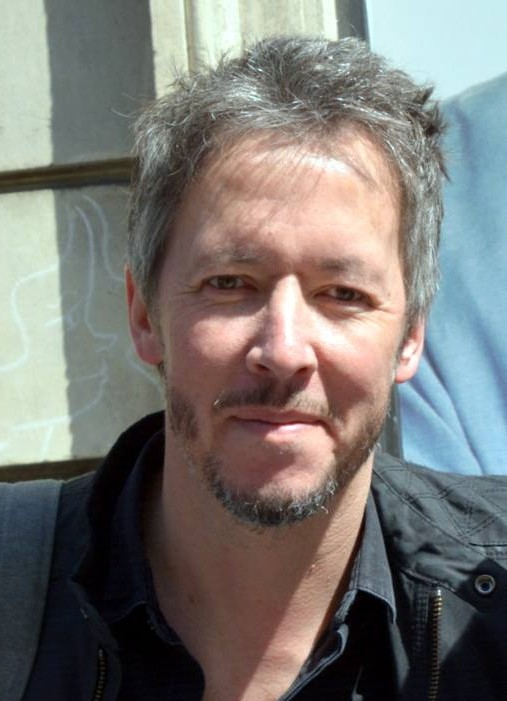
- Lemoine in 2016
- Born: Jean-Luc Marie Lemoine; 6 March 1970 (age 55); 15th arrondissement of Paris, France
- Education: IUT of Sceaux
- Occupations: Humorist, radio host, television presenter, screenwriter
- Years active: 1993–present
- Known for: Les Questions en 4/3
- Notable work: Regular guest on On va s'gêner on Europe 1 hosted by Laurent Ruquier
- Television: On n'est pas couché, L'habit ne fait pas Lemoine and Le Bureau des plaintes on France 2 Touche pas à mon poste! on C8

Jean-Luc Marie Lemoine (born 6 March 1970) is a French humourist, media personality and stand-up comedian.

== Early life ==
A native of Paris, Lemoine grew up in Morangis, Essonne. His first scene was on his high school stage, in front of 800 fellow students.

In 1993, he played at the Théâtre des Blancs-Manteaux in Paris for 15 days and later worked as a columnist for the satirical weekly Infos du Monde, based upon Weekly World News in the United States. He started his television career on local Téléssonne channel. The following year, he played a show during 10 months, directed by Franck Dubosc.

== Career ==
Lemoine was a regular guest on On a tout essayé on France 2 from 2001 to 2006, when he joined On n'est pas couché for two seasons.

From 2011 until 2018, Lemoine was part of the slate of regular guests on Touche pas à mon poste! on France 4 and then D8, when the talk show hosted by Cyril Hanouna switched channels in 2012. He also had a weekly segment called Les Questions en 4/3. In 2015, his segment became a TV special for one prime time.

In 2013, he joined Hanouna on his radio programme Les pieds dans le plat broadcast on Europe 1. From 2016 to 2017 and in 2017 respectively, he hosted the game shows Guess My Age and Couple or Not? on C8, both of which were created by Vivendi Entertainment and have spawned numerous international versions.

Lemoine quit C8 in 2018. He has hosted Samedi d'en rire on France 3 since 2019. He has also been a regular guest on Les Grosses Têtes since 2019.
