= One Man and His Cow =

- Theatrical release poster
- La Vache
- Directed by: Mohamed Hamidi
- Written by: Mohamed Hamidi; Alain-Michel Blanc; Fatsah Bouyahmed
- Produced by: Nicolas Duval-Adassovsky; Laurent Zeitoun; Yann Zenou
- Starring: Fatsah Bouyahmed; Lambert Wilson; Jamel Debbouze
- Cinematography: Elin Kirschfink
- Edited by: Marion Monnier
- Music by: Ibrahim Maalouf
- Production company: Quad Productions
- Distributed by: Pathé
- Release date: 17 February 2016 (France)
- Running time: 91 minutes
- Countries: France; Algeria
- Languages: French; Arabic
- Budget: $5.6 million
- Box office: $8 million

One Man and His Cow (original title: La Vache – The Cow) is a 2016 French comedy film directed by Mohamed Hamidi.

== Plot ==
Fatah, a modest, cheerful and optimistic Algerian farmer who has never left his country, dreams of taking his cow Jacqueline to the Paris International Agricultural Show.

One day, to everyone's surprise, he receives an invitation to participate in the Paris show. He must then borrow money from all of the men of the village to complete his journey. He leaves his wife Naima and his two daughters and takes the boat to Marseille with his cow. But, having spent all his money to cross the Mediterranean, he is forced to walk to Paris. It is the start of a trip through France full of interesting encounters; Fatah finds himself repudiated by his brother-in-law, leading a slightly-too-inebriated village fair, being hosted by a bankrupt count, embroiled in a violent demonstration, is separated from Jacqueline, and finally jailed. Meanwhile, in his village, expectations rise and fall while the local mukhtar tries to make time with Naima, Fatah's wife, telling her husband isn't coming home.

Spotted by the press, the brave walker and his cow become instant sensations on social media, provoking admiration and a few mockers. Despite difficulties, real dangers and despair, Fatah strives to reach the show in time to enter Jacqueline into the contest for the most beautiful Tarentaise cow...

== Cast ==
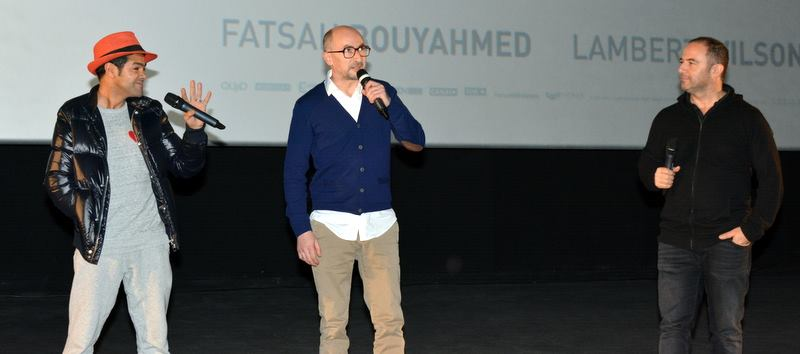
Jamel Debbouze, Fatsah Bouyahmed and director Mohamed Hamidi at a preview.

- Fatsah Bouyahmed as Fatah
- Lambert Wilson as Philippe
- Jamel Debbouze as Hassan
- Ophélia Kolb as Stéphanie
- Christian Ameri as Lucien
- Fehd Benchemsi as Samir
- Abdellah Chakiri as Mokhtar
- Catherine Davenier as Jacqueline
- Brigitte Guedj as Brigitte
- Miloud Khetib as Hamé Hamed
- Karina Marimon as Cathy
- Hajar Masdouki as Naïma
- Charline Paul as Claire
- Thor Schenker as Armand
- Malik Bentalha as The young commuter
- Julia Piaton as The young reporter
- Cyril Hanouna as himself
- Anne-Sophie Lapix as herself
- Élise Lucet as herself
