= Pattaya (film) =

- Theatrical release poster
- Directed by: Franck Gastambide
- Written by: Franck Gastambide; Stéphane Kazandjian
- Produced by: Éric Altmayer; Nicolas Altmayer; Pascal Bonnet
- Starring: Franck Gastambide; Malik Bentalha; Anouar Toubali
- Cinematography: Renaud Chassaing
- Edited by: Laure Gardette
- Music by: Éric Neveux; DJ Kore
- Production company: Mandarin Films
- Distributed by: Gaumont
- Release date: 24 February 2016
- Running time: 97 minutes
- Country: France
- Language: French
- Budget: $7.6 million
- Box office: $13.4 million

Pattaya, known as Good Guys Go to Heaven, Bad Guys Go to Pattaya internationally, is a 2016 French comedy film directed by and starring Franck Gastambide.

== Plot ==
Franky and Krimo plan a trip to the resort of Pattaya, Thailand. To save money, they enter their friend Karim into a local Muay Thai tournament for dwarfs without his knowledge.

== Cast ==
- Franck Gastambide as Francky
- Malik Bentalha as Krimo
- Anouar Toubali as Karim
- Ramzy Bedia as Reza
- Gad Elmaleh as The Moroccan
- Sabrina Ouazani as Lilia
- Sissi Duparc as Alexandra
- Donia Eden as Aurélie
- Sami Bouajila as Krimo's father
- Fred Testot as Pilot
- Melha Bedia as Stewardess
- Cyril Hanouna as Casting Director
