= Xenia Fedorova =

Russian journalist and commentator

- Fedorova in 2018
- Born: 26 December 1980 (age 45); Kazan, Soviet Russia
- Citizenship: Russia
- Occupations: Journalist, political commentator

Xenia Fedorova (born 26 December 1980) is a Russian journalist and political commentator who was the head of RT France from 2017 to 2023. In July 2026, she received an expulsion order from the French Ministry of the Interior for her activities.

== Life and career ==
Fedorova was born in Kazan, Soviet Russia. She joined Russian state media outlet Russia Today (RT) in 2006. In December 2017, she became the head of the newly established RT France. After RT France was banned from France in 2022 and closed down the following year, Fedorova remained in the country. She subsequently became a regular commentator on several French conservative media outlets owned by Vincent Bolloré, including CNews, Europe 1 and Le Journal du Dimanche. In this role, she was described as spreading Russian government narratives, including on the Russo-Ukrainian war.

In March 2025, she published a book called Bannie. Liberté d'expression sous condition (Banned. Freedom of expression with conditions) about her experiences and political views.

=== Expulsion from France ===
On 29 July 2026, Fedorova was issued an expulsion order requiring her to leave France, with the Ministry of the Interior citing her acting as a "conduit for disinformation campaigns led by Russian authorities" and "undermining the fundamental interests of the state". Fedorova criticized this as "censorship of opinions that do not align with the official narrative" and argued she had a right to express her views. Her assets were also frozen for six months and she was required to report to police daily. Fedorova's lawyer stated she was abroad when the order was issued and would not return to France while it was in place. On 3 August, a Paris court rejected Fedorova's appeal against the three measures.

After the order, Fedorova continued to write columns in Le Journal du Dimanche from abroad. On 10 September, Interior Minister Laurent Nuñez warned CNews that they would face criminal charges if Fedorova appeared in their broadcasts.

On 24 September, Fedorova was sanctioned by the European Union.
