= Antoine Bernheim =

French banker and business executive (1924–2012)

- Born: 4 September 1924; Paris, France
- Died: 5 June 2012 (aged 87); Paris, France
- Occupations: Banker and business executive
- Known for: Senior partner of Lazard; chairman of Generali
- Awards: Grand Cross of the Legion of Honour

Antoine Bernheim (4 September 1924 – 5 June 2012) was a French banker and business executive. He spent more than three decades as a senior partner of Lazard and served two periods as chairman of the Italian insurer Generali, from 1995 to 1999 and from 2002 to 2010.

At Lazard he advised entrepreneurs including Bernard Arnault, Vincent Bolloré, and François Pinault. His work on corporate control and succession made him an influential figure in French and Italian finance, and obituaries variously described him as a kingmaker and as a "godfather" of French capitalism.

== Early life and education ==
Bernheim was born in Paris on 4 September 1924 into a Jewish family. He attended the Lycée Janson-de-Sailly. During the German occupation of France, the family left Paris for Grenoble, where Bernheim studied science and became involved with the French Resistance. His parents were arrested in 1943 and killed after being deported to Auschwitz.

After returning to Paris, Bernheim completed studies in law. He later was described as a graduate in both law and science.

== Career ==
=== Early career and Lazard ===
Bernheim began his business career in 1951 with the perfume company Bourjois, which was controlled by the Wertheimer family. He worked on reorganizing the company before leaving in 1955 to manage a real-estate business.

In 1967, banker André Meyer recruited Bernheim to Lazard. Bernheim became a senior partner at the firm's Paris operation and remained a central figure there for more than thirty years. He advised Arnault on the 1984 acquisition of the textile group Boussac, whose assets included Christian Dior, and on the struggle for control of LVMH in 1988. He also helped Bolloré develop the holding-company structure through which the Bolloré group was controlled.

Bernheim's relationships extended into Italian business. He served as vice-chairman of the Milan investment bank Mediobanca from 1988 to 2001. He left Lazard following a dispute with Michel David-Weill over the firm's leadership and direction.

=== Generali and other directorships ===
Bernheim's involvement with Generali began through its French operations. He joined the insurer's board in 1973, became vice-chairman in 1990, and was appointed chairman in 1995. In 1996, Generali sold its holding in the French insurer Axa. The following year, Generali made an unsuccessful bid for Assurances Générales de France.

Mediobanca supported Bernheim's removal as Generali chairman in 1999. He returned as vice-chairman in 2001 and regained the chairmanship in 2002. His second term ended in April 2010 after another disagreement with Mediobanca, Generali's principal shareholder at the time. Across both periods, he chaired Generali for approximately twelve years.

Bernheim also held board positions at companies including LVMH, the Bolloré group, Eurazeo, Ciments Français, and EuropaCorp. He left the LVMH board in April 2012 after about twenty-five years as a director.

== Influence and honours ==
Bernheim was known for advising business owners in transactions that shaped several large French corporate groups. Les Echos credited him with an important role in the development of Arnault's and Bolloré's businesses, while Reuters described his influence as extending across French and Italian finance. His relationships with business and political figures also led French coverage to characterize him as a faiseur de rois, or kingmaker.

In 2007, Bernheim was elevated to Grand Cross, the highest class of the Legion of Honour.

== Personal life and death ==
Bernheim married Francine Bernard in 1947. They had two children, Martine and Pierre-Antoine. Their son, a historian of religion, died in 2011.

Bernheim died in his sleep in Paris on 5 June 2012, aged 87.

== Honours and awards ==
- Grand-Croix of the Order of Legion of Honour (2007)
- Commandeur of the Ordre des Arts et des Lettres (2006)
- Grand-Officier of the Order of Merit of the Italian Republic (1995)
