= Domino Day =

TV show on breaking the record for toppling dominoes

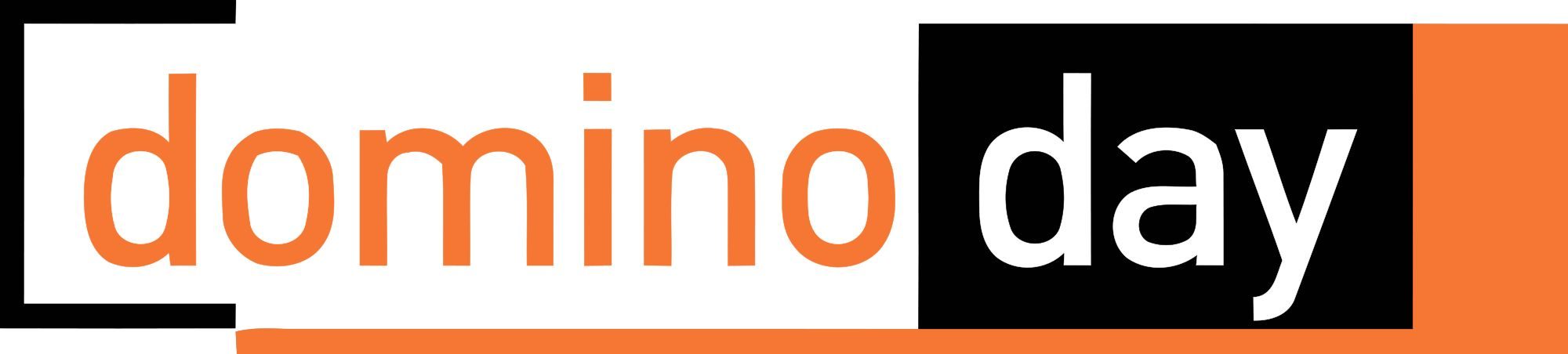
- Genre: Entertainment; Television special Game show
- Created by: Robin Paul Weijers
- Presented by: International host: Linda de Mol (1999–2002); Frauke Ludowig (2004–06)
- Theme music composer: Ruud Mulder
- Country of origin: Netherlands
- Original languages: Dutch, German, English
- No. of seasons: 11
- No. of episodes: 11

Production
- Production company: Endemol

Original release
- Network: Netherlands SBS6; Germany RTL
- Release: 28 August 1998 – 13 November 2009

Domino Day is a world record attempt for the highest number of toppling domino stones, organized from 1998 to 2009 by Endemol Netherlands. Together with Weijers Domino Productions of Robin Paul Weijers, also known as Mr. Domino, parties teamed up to set a new world record. The production was mainly organized at the WTC Expo in Leeuwarden, Netherlands. Domino day did not occur in 2003, because the producer wanted to revise the format.

== Subsequent record attempts ==
Date	Year	Theme	Location	Result	Fallen	Total	%	First Stone toppled by
28 August	1998	Domino D-Day: Visionland	Leeuwarden, Netherlands	Success	1,605,757	2,250,000	71.3	Linda de Mol
5 November	1999	Domino Day: Europa ohne Grenzen (Europe Without Borders)	Zuidlaren, Netherlands	Success	2,472,480	2,500,000	98.9	Hans Klok
3 November	2000	Domino Day: Action - Reaction	Zuidlaren, Netherlands	Success	2,977,678	3,112,000	95.7	Lionel Richie
16 November	2001	Domino Day: Bridging the World	Maastricht, Netherlands	Success	3,540,562	3,750,000	94.4	Kylie Minogue
15 November	2002	Domino Day: Expressions for Millions	Leeuwarden, Netherlands	Success	3,847,295	4,000,000	96.2	Nick Carter
12 November	2004	Domino Day: The Challenge	Leeuwarden, Netherlands	Success	3,992,397	4,250,000	93.9	Shania Twain
18 November	2005	Domino Day: Domino Theatre of Eternal Stories	Leeuwarden, Netherlands	Success	4,002,136	4,321,000	92.6	Anastacia
17 November	2006	Domino Day: Music in Motion	Leeuwarden, Netherlands	Success	4,079,381	4,400,000	92.7	Kim Wilde
16 November	2007	Domino Day: Falling into Life	Leeuwarden, Netherlands	Failure	3,671,465	4,500,000	81.6	Katie Melua
14 November	2008	Domino Day: Celebrating 10 years of Domino Day	Leeuwarden, Netherlands	Success	4,345,027	4,500,000	96.6	Salima Peippo
13 November	2009	Domino Day: The World in Domino - The Show with the Flow	Leeuwarden, Netherlands	Success	4,491,863	4,800,000	93.6	Jeroen de Meij

== Recurring elements ==
=== Builders' Challenge ===
Starting in 2004, each Domino Day has featured Builders' Challenges, with three challenges in 2004 and 2005, and four challenges starting in 2006. Builders are usually chosen in pairs for each Builder's Challenge. The chosen builders then have to complete vital parts of the setup while the dominoes are already toppling elsewhere, in order to allow another field of dominoes to topple. This usually takes the form of trying to bridge the gap(s) in an unfinished setup before the toppling dominoes reach it.

Builders Challenge results
Year	1	2	3	4
2004	Success	Failure	Failure	n/a
2005	Success	Interrupted	Cheated	n/a
2006	Build Fail	Gate Fail	Gate Fail	Success
2007	Failure	Success	Success	Failure
2008	Success	Failure	Success	Success
2009	Failure	Failure	Failure	Success

For the 2005 event, the dominoes which fell during the third builders challenge were not counted for the record as it was determined that one of the builders restarted the flow of the dominoes after they had stopped due to two being placed too far apart. In the 2006 event the second and third builders challenge were successful in that the challenge was completed, but due to incorrect timing the gates did not lift, thus stopping the flow before it reached the fields.

=== Slow Stones ===
Starting in 2006, a series of "Slow Stones" are placed just before the final Builders Challenge. Slow Stones are relatively large, transparent domino stones filled with colored powder, with each Slow Stone containing a different-colored powder. Upon reaching the first Slow Stone, its powder begins to drain (similar to an hourglass) until it becomes light enough to tip over, hitting the next Slow Stone to start its powder draining. The process takes approximately one minute per Slow Stone. The Slow Stones are used as an opportunity to cut to advertising, show highlights from earlier in the show, do interviews, etc. The builders of the last Builders Challenge are also selected during the Slow Stones, and the challenge itself starts after the last Slow Stone has fallen.

== Past Domino Day editions ==
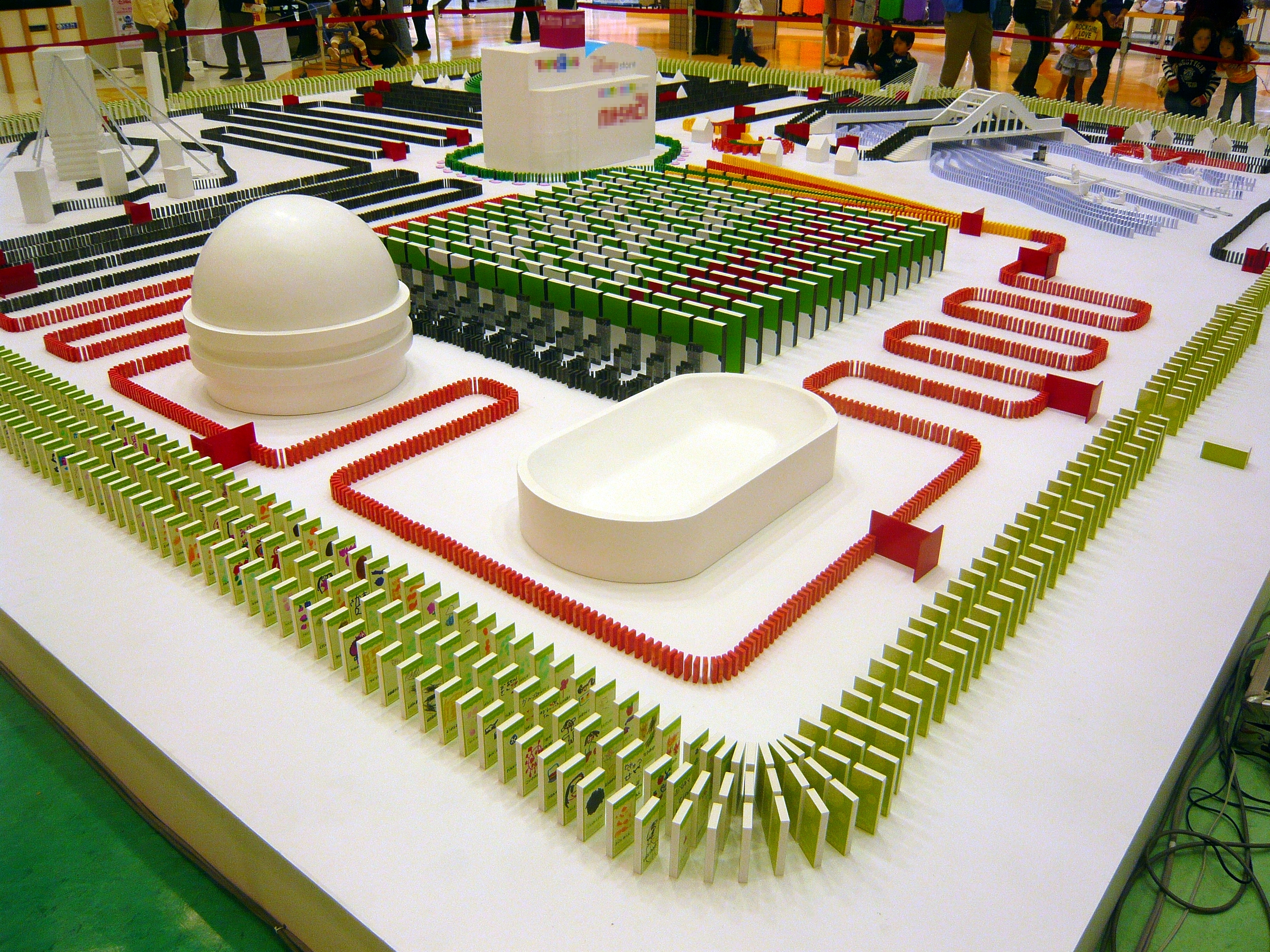
A domino show

=== Domino Day 2005 ===
During the preparations of Domino Day 2005 on 14 November, with only four days to go until event, a sparrow flew into the building and landed on several domino bricks, eventually causing 23,000 of them (out of 4 million) to fall. The sparrow was eventually shot by a hired exterminator. Outraged by the shooting, animal rights groups took court actions against the exterminator and the Domino Day production company Endemol. Public prosecutors in The Hague opened an investigation and eventually issued a €200 fine to the exterminator.

=== Domino Day 2006 ===
A new world record was set on 17 November on Domino Day. 4,079,381 stones were toppled out of the 4,400,000 that were set up. The first three builders' challenges failed so the success of the last challenge was crucial to setting the world record.

The design of the course took about a year and a team of 90 builders took around two months to build it.

The theme, Music in Motion, represents 9 different kinds of music: Rock n' Roll, Classical Music, Pop Star, Schlager, Roaring 20's, Flower Power, World Music, Hip Hop, and Disco Fever.

The Builder's Challenges represent the history of the music players, which are: Record Player, Tape Player, CD Player, and MP3 player.

Each Builder's Challenge has a field with a number of dominoes with the number 4 At the beginning. The record player challenge field contains 400 dominoes, the tape player challenge has a field of 4,000 dominoes, the CD player challenge contains 40,000 dominoes, and the MP3 player challenge contains 400,000 dominoes.

=== Domino Day 2007 ===
The theme of this year was 'Falling into Life'. A total of 4,500,000 stones were placed by 85 builders from 12 countries. Only 81.6% of the dominoes fell, resulting in a final count of 3,671,465.

The theme,'Falling into Life', represents 9 different topics which are part of our Life: Loving, Having Fun, Dreaming, Communication, Consuming, Letting Go, Growing, Struggling, Traveling.

Domino Day 2007 was held on 16 November and appeared to fail mostly because of the unsuccessful final challenge to create a bridge of dominoes on a revolving hammer/clock structure to link up with over 400,000 stones. However, it was later revealed that even if this area had fallen, the 2006 record would not have been broken. It was the first time that Domino Day failed to set a new record.

=== Domino Day 2008 ===
On 14 November 2008 the team of Weijers Domino Productions tried to break the world record domino toppling. They set up 4.5 million dominoes in the WTC Expo convention centre in Leeuwarden to try topping the previous record of 2 years ago, which was at 4,079,381 dominoes toppled.

'Celebrating 10 years of Domino Day - Breaking more World Records than ever' is the central theme of Domino Day 2008. Domino Day celebrates its 10th anniversary this year.

Although the second Builder's Challenge failed, the record was broken with 4,345,027 dominoes toppled. Also, 10 additional world records were attempted and successfully broken. These additional world records were:

1. Longest domino spiral (200 m)
2. Highest domino climb (12 m)
3. Smallest domino stone (7 mm)
4. Largest domino stone (4.8 m)
5. Longest domino wall (16 m)
6. Largest domino structure (25,000 stones)
7. Fastest topple of 30 metres of domino stones (4.21 sec) (the sprinter Churandy Martina ran with the dominoes and achieved the time of 3.81 sec for the same distance)
8. Largest number of domino stones resting on a single domino (727 stones)
9. Largest rectangular level domino field (1 million stones)
10. Most fallen dominoes (4,345,027 stones)

=== Domino Day 2009 ===
The 2009 event is entitled 'The World in Domino - The Show with the Flow'. It was the 11th edition of the show; it showed different aspects of the world with the display moving from continent to continent. The design used 4.8 million dominoes. 4,345,027 dominoes were needed to be toppled in order to break the standing world record. Even though part of the final section of the piece did not fall, and three builder's challenges failed, the number of dominoes toppled was 4,491,863.

The flows for 2009 are: The American Dream, Latin Extravaganza, The African Life, Colors of Europe, Balancing Yin and Yang, Rough Ice, and Sun, Sand, and Sealife.

The 1st and 2nd Builder's Challenges contained 25,000 dominoes representing earth and air, the 3rd Builder's Challenge contained 50,000 dominoes representing water, and the 4th Builder's Challenge had 500,000 dominoes representing all of Earth's continents.

=== 2010–2020 ===
From 2010, until 2020, the show was officially paused due to financial and organizational problems.

== Future ==
On February 3, 2020, EndemolShine Nederland announced Domino Day 2020 through an Instagram post, on 16 June producer EndemolShine announced that the 2020 edition will be postponed to March 2021. On 9 September 2021, Domino Day was postponed to an indefinite date. Currently, no further date has been announced.

== International broadcast ==
Country	Name	Host	TV station	Live	Years
Austria	Domino Day	Marie Christine Giuliani (2000–2002), Armin Assinger (2004–2009)	ORF eins	Yes	2000–2009
Belgium	Domino D-Day (1998); Domino Day	Stefan Van Loock	VTM	Yes	1998–2009
Croatia	Domino Day	Antonija Mandić, Dorijan Klarić	RTL Televizija	Yes	2005–2009
France	Domino Day – Record du monde	Denis Brogniart; Flavie Flament, Dave (2001–2005)	TF1 (2001–2005), TMC (2006–2009)	Yes	2001–2009
France	Domino Day – Les records les plus incroyables	Valérie Bénaïm	D8	No	2014–present*
Germany; Producer	Domino Day	Linda de Mol (1998–2002), Frauke Ludowig (2004–2009)	RTL	Yes	1998–2009
Germany; Producer	Domino Day – Highlights	Linda de Mol	RTL & Super RTL	No	2003
Greece	Ημέρα του ντόμινο	Katerina Karavatou, Fotis Sergoulopoulos	Alpha TV	Yes	2008–2009
Hungary	Dominó Nap	Adolf L. Kósa (2001); Gabriella Jakupcsek (2001–2002); Zoltán Szujó, Lilu (2004–2009); Vanda Dombóvári (2004–2007); Éva Horváth (2008–2009)	TV2 (2001–2002), RTL Klub (2004–2009)	Yes	2001–2009
Netherlands; Original format, Producer	Domino D-Day (1998); Domino Day	Hans Kraay, Jr., Wendy van Dijk (1998–2004), Nance (2005–2009)	SBS6, Net5 (1999)	Yes	1998–2009
Poland	Dzień Domina	–	TVN	Yes	2005–2009
Russia	День Домино	Egor Pirogov (Егор Пирогов)	REN TV	No	2005–2009
Slovakia	Domino Day	Matej Cifra	TV JOJ	Yes	2007–2009
Spain	Domino Day	Constantino Romero (2001–2002), Carlos Sobera (2004–2007)	Antena 3	No	2001–2007
United Kingdom	Domino Day	Christian Stevenson	Channel 5	No	2005–2009
United States	Domino Day 2001	Rich Eisen	ABC	No	2001

(* reruns)

== Ratings ==
=== 1998 ===
- Netherlands (SBS6): 3,800,000
- Germany (RTL Germany): 9,500,000

=== 1999 ===
- Netherlands (Net5): 2,700,000

=== 2001 ===
- Germany (RTL Germany): 11,960,000
- France (TF1): 8,616,000
- Netherlands (SBS6): 3,407,500
- Hungary (TV2): 2,472,970
- Austria (ORF): 1,238,000
- United States (ABC): 9,400,000
- Spain (Antena3): 1,826,000

=== 2002 ===
- Germany: 12,680,000
- France: 7,600,000
- Netherlands: 3,369,602
- Hungary: 1,367,320
- Austria: 926,000
- Belgium: (Kanaal2 & 2BE): 836,400
- Spain: 1,299,000

=== 2004 ===
- Netherlands: 2,366,000
- Hungary (RTL Klub): 3,148,196

=== 2005 ===
- Netherlands: 2,405,000
- Hungary: 2,978,611

=== 2006 ===
- Germany: 6,960,000
- Netherlands: 2,068,000
- Belgium: 342,000
- Hungary: 2,997,817

=== 2007 ===
- Netherlands: 2,658,000
- Belgium: 477,240
- Germany: 6,000,000
- Poland (TVN): 3,000,000
- Hungary: 1,423,000
- Slovakia: 373,000

=== 2008 ===
- Netherlands: 2,742,000
- Germany: 7,570,000
- Belgium: 850,000
- Hungary: 1,410,000

=== 2009 ===
- Netherlands: 3,400,000
- Belgium: 890,000
- Germany: 5,900,000
- Hungary: 1,295,000

== See also ==
- Domino show
