= Julien Courbet =

French journalist and presenter (born 1965)

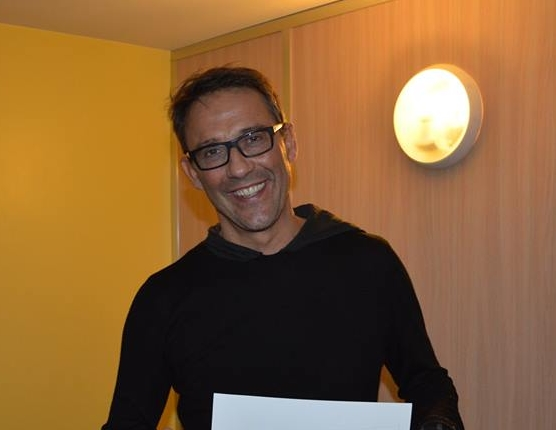
- Courbet in 2014
- Born: Frédéric René Courbet; 7 February 1965 (age 61); Bordeaux, Gironde, France
- Occupations: Radio presenter, television presenter, television producer, game show host
- Years active: 1986–present
- Notable credit(s): Sans aucun doute Ça peut vous arriver Les Sept Péchés capitaux Le Maillon Faible
- Television: TF1 (1994–2008); France 2 (2008–2013) TMC (2013–2014) C8 (2014–2018) M6 (2018–)
- Height: 6 ft 1.25 in (1.86 m)
- Spouse: Catherine Courbet (1998–present)
- Website: www.juliencourbet.com

Julien Courbet (born 7 February 1965) is a French journalist, television presenter and producer.

== Early life and education ==
Julien Courbet was born Frédéric René Courbet in Eysines, a town located in the suburb of Bordeaux, department of Gironde. He studied and graduated at the IUT Techniques de commercialisation in the University Bordeaux IV.

== Radio career ==
Julien Courbet began his career as a presenter on various radio stations in Bordeaux (Radio Angora, NRJ, Fun Radio and Wit FM). From 1986 to 1991, he became a presenter on France 3 Aquitaine. He officiated on Wit FM hosting the program Que fait la police? in the morning on Sud Radio, where he met Hervé Pouchol, who would later become his mediator for La guerre des voisins, and subsequently on NRJ from 1992 to 1994 with the program N'importe quoi.

== Television career ==
=== Career on TF1 ===
He met Gérard Louvin in 1993, who hired him for TF1. After being a columnist on the program Sacrée Soirée, Julien Courbet started presenting programs produced by Gérard Louvin, starting with Sans aucun doute. From 1994 to 2008, he officiated on the channel, where he hosted a number of programs (Code de la route...) and produced some of them (Le Grand Frère, Le Détective...). He rose to fame by becoming the presenter specializing in romance scams, especially with Les Sept Péchés capitaux and Sans aucun doute, which attracted a good audience. He then created in 2004 the program Stop arnaques.

In 2005, he created his new production company La Concepteria, after having sold the previous one Quai Sud Télévisions at TF1, who owned the programs Sans aucun doute and Confessions Intimes. In March 2007, he created a website which is a guide for the consumers, with articles treating about legal terms, explaining the rights, the obligations and the solutions to problems that can have the customers.

=== Career on France 2 ===
In September 2008, he joined France 2 to present until February 2009 the program Service Maximum on prime time. His departure from TF1 was justified by the fact that the channel refused to broadcast a daily program before the evening. France 2 accepted Julien Courbet for the job after his interview with Patrick de Carolis. However, despite his departure from France 2, he continued to produce the program Le Grand Frère for TF1. In 2008, he produced the program Je suis timide mais j'me soigne on channel Direct 8.

His arrival on France 2 was not appreciated by everybody, especially by Nicolas Sarkozy and the Minister of Culture. His new program was also not well received by the audience. In February 2009, the program was not broadcast anymore, but Julien Courbet stayed with France Télévisions.

=== France Télévisions ===
After the failure of Service Maximum, Julien Courbet continued presenting his program of defence for the consumers on RTL, but also managed to present entertainment and game shows on television. In May 2009, he commentated with Cyril Hanouna on the 54th Eurovision Song Contest directly from Moscow, which was won by Alexander Rybak for Norway and where French singer Patricia Kaas was ranked number eight for France. In June 2009, he presented Le Grand défi des animateurs.

In summer 2009, he hosted the game show Le 4^{e} duel from Monday to Friday in the evening. He later presented the game show En toutes lettres on France 2, first alone and then with Pierre Bellemare. In December 2009, he presented the program Soyons sport! on France 2 and France 3 directly from Annecy for the Téléthon with Amel Bent and Sophie Davant. In summer 2010, he hosted once again the game show Le 4^{e} duel for a new season, but this time it was broadcast on weekends.

In the meantime, he continued producing programs for TF1, such as Tous ensemble since 2009, Abus de confiance since July 2010 and Voisins, vont-ils se mettre d'accord since October 2010, featuring former tennis player Henri Leconte, who became a specialist in communication. In September 2010, he continued hosting the game shows En toutes lettres and Le 4^{e} duel. In December 2010, he presented another series of the program Le Grand défi des animateurs.

In June 2011, he presented the program Code de la route : À vous de jouer and, in September 2011, the program Seriez-vous un bon expert ? on France 2. In May 2012, he presented the program La grande révision on the same channel and, in June, another season of the game show Le 4^{e} duel.

== Personal life ==
Julien Courbet married Catherine Courbet in July 1998. They have two children, a daughter Lola (born 20 April 2000) and a son Gabin (born 10 December 2001). As his 60th birthday approached, he decided to cut back sharply on his meat consumption and denounced the mistreatment of animals.

== Television programs ==
=== TF1 (1994–2008) ===
- Pourquoi pas vous ? (1994)
- Vacances à Saint-Tropez (1994)
- Sans aucun doute (1994–2008)
- Si on chantait (1995–96)
- Parlez-moi d'amour (1995)
- Les années pub (1996)
- Les enfants de la guerre (1996)
- Quel cirque ! (1997)
- Intervilles with Jean-Pierre Foucault (1998)
- Les Sept Péchés capitaux (1999–2006)
- Succès (1999)
- Ça peut vous arriver (2001–02)
- Le Coach (2002)
- Le Champion de la télé (2004)
- La Grande Soirée Anti-Arnaque (2005–07)
- La Grande Soirée du sommeil (2005)
- Les 30 arnaques de stars les plus incroyables (2006)
- Les voisins vont-ils se mettre d'accord ? (2006)
- Les maîtres de l'imposture (2007)
- Les 40 arnaques les plus incroyables (2007)
- Code de la route, repassez-le en direct (2008)
- Le Détective (2008)
- Les Rois du Système D (2008)

=== France 2 (2008–13) ===
- Service Maximum (2008–09)
- Le Téléthon (2008–10)
- Le grand défi des animateurs (2009–10)
- Le 4^{e} duel (2009–12)
- En toutes lettres (2009–11)
- Une star peut en bluffer une autre (2010)
- Votre plus belle soirée (2011)
- Code de la route : À vous de jouer (2011)
- Seriez-vous un bon expert ? (2011–13)
- La grande révision (2012)

=== TMC (2013–14) ===
- Sans aucun doute

=== D8 - C8 (2014–2018) ===
- Le Maillon Faible (2014-2015, revival of The Weakest Link)
- À prendre ou à laisser (2014-2015)
- Touche pas à mon poste ! (2014-2018) : columnist and substitute host
- Le Grand Match (2015)
- Les Rois du barbecue (September 2015)
- Faut pas abuser (2016-2017)
- Still Standing : Qui passera à la trappe ? (summer 2016)
- Les Sept Péchés capitaux (2016-2017)
- Abus de confiance (2017)
- La Télé même l'été ! et La Télé même l'été ! Le jeu ! (summer 2017)
- C'est que de la télé ! (September 2017 - June 2018)
- Héritage de Johnny : la guerre des clans (March 2018)
- Nordahl Lelandais, dans la tête du prédateur (June 2018)

=== Producer ===
- Confessions Intimes (since 2001) on TF1
- Voisins vont-ils se mettre d'accord ? (2006) on TF1
- Le Grand Frère (2006–12) on TF1
- Le Monde à l'Envers (2007–08) presented by Jean-Pierre Pernaut on TF1
- Au cœur du couple (2008) on TF1
- Tous ensemble (since 2009) on TF1
- Abus de confiance (2010) on TF1
- Voisins vont-ils se mettre d'accord ? (since 2010) with Henri Leconte on TF1
- Le Resto, l'espoir d'une nouvelle vie since 2011 on TF1
- Le Jour où tout a basculé (since 2011) on France 2
- Le Jour où tout à basculé à l'audience (since 2012) on France 2
- En toutes lettres ! (2009–11)
- Seriez-vous un bon expert ? (2011–13)

== Bibliography ==
- Ôtez-moi d'un doute (1998), Éditions 1 (ISBN 9782863918593)
- Stop aux Arnaques - Le Guide Spécial Logement (2004), Michel Lafon (ISBN 9782749901862)
- Stop aux Arnaques - Le Guide (2004), Michel Lafon (ISBN 9782749900971)
- Stop aux arnaques le guide - Spécial patrimoine (2005), Michel Lafon (ISBN 9782749903613)
- Stop aux arnaques : le guide spécial vacances (2006), Michel Lafon (ISBN 9782749902593)
- Stop aux arnaques, le guide, spécial santé (2007), Michel Lafon (ISBN 9782749906263)
- Le guide du bon voisinage à la ville et à la campagne (2007), Flammarion (ISBN 9782081200975)
- Le Guide du consommer moins cher (2009), Solar (ISBN 9782263048647)
