= Énora Malagré =

French columnist

Enora Malagré
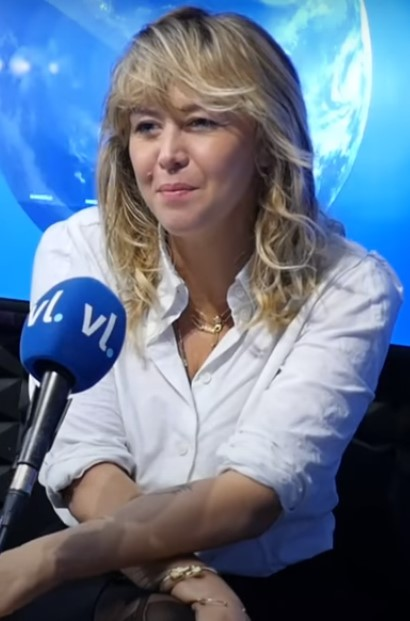
- Enora Malagré (2020)
- Born: Morlaix, Finistère, France
- Occupations: Columnist, radio presenter, television presenter
- Years active: 2004–present
- Notable credit(s): Touche pas à mon poste ! Nouvelle Star, ça continue... Derrière le poste Enora le soir (Virgin Radio)
- Television: D8 (2010–2017)
- Height: 5 ft 1 in (1.55 m)
- Partner: Cut Killer (2001–13)

Enora Malagré is a French columnist, radio and television presenter.

== Early life and education ==
Énora Malagré was born in Morlaix in the department of Finistère in Brittany. She then moved in the department of Yvelines at the age of ten, and at her majority, she then lived in Paris. She was first trained to become a comedian, but then studied law and debuted her career on television.

== Radio career ==
She began her career on radio and media after meeting the co-founder of Radio Nova, who stated that she had a perfect radio voice and then invited her to join the radio station. Enora Malagré debuted on radio in 2004 on Nova where she is sometimes a columnist and sometimes a presenter for six years. From September 2010 to July 2011, she co-hosted with Sébastien Cauet the program C'Cauet on NRJ. She then left NRJ after one year.

In August 2012 and for one year, she co-hosted with Cyril Hanouna the program Hanouna le matin, the morning program on Virgin Radio and the second part of the evening since 26 August 2013 in a program produced by Cyril Hanouna and titled Enora le soir. In June 2013, she became one of the members of the radio program On va s'gêner hosted by Laurent Ruquier on Europe 1.

== Television career ==
Enora Malagré hosted her first television program on Arte in 2005, a musical program titled Juke box memories. In 2008, she is the voice-over on the game show Cash ou tâche on channel RTL9. In 2009, she made sketches for the program La mode la mode la mode broadcast on Paris Première, which marked her real debut on television. She later presented Pouet Pouet croisette on the same channel.

She later joined France Télévisions and became a columnist for the program Le Bureau des Plaintes on France 2 in March 2011. She then hosted on France 4 the program Et toi, est-ce que tu buzz ?. In February 2011, she co-hosted the program Frog & Rosbif with Louise Ekland and in June, she co-hosted Louise contre attaque. In September, she presented Ça va mieux en le disant with Élodie Gossuin on the same channel, a program that ended soon after due to a bad audience.

Since April 2010, Enora Malagré is a columnist in the program Touche pas à mon poste ! hosted by Cyril Hanouna, broadcast on France 4 and then on D8. In October 2012, she is present daily in the program. In December of that year, she co-hosts with Cyril Hanouna the program Virgin Radio Fans in direct on Virgin Radio and D17, and since January 2013, the program Nouvelle Star, ça continue... on Tuesday at the second part of the evening on D8. In 2014, she presents a new program titled Derrière le poste on primetime on the same channel. In 2019, she became a columnist in the program Bons Baisers d'Europe on France 2.

== Advertisement ==
In 2010, Enora Malagré participated at an advertisement for the brand Schweppes and made chronicles in partnership with the brand and Radio Nova.

== Personal life ==
Enora Malagré is openly bisexual. She had a relationship with French DJ Cut Killer from 2001 to 2013. She confirmed being single again during her appearance in the program Salut les Terriens presented by Thierry Ardisson on 20 July 2013 on Canal+.
