= Touche pas à mon poste! =

French live television talk show

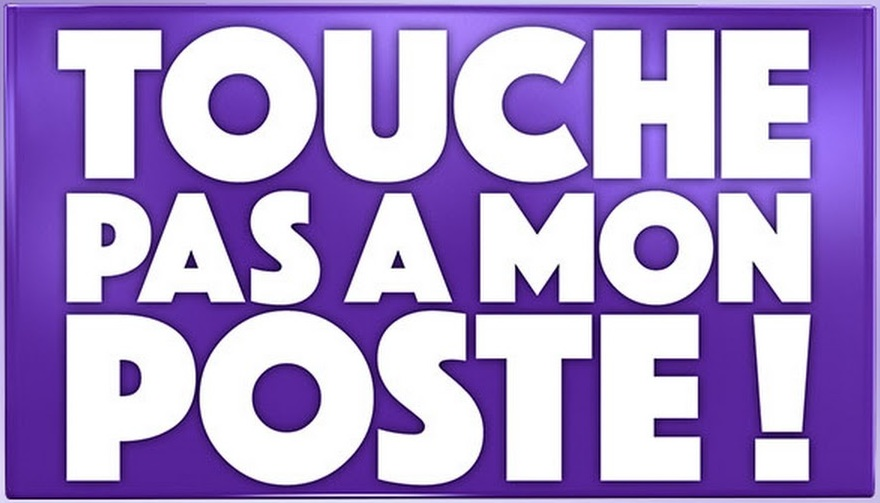
- Logo for "Touche pas à mon poste" (2020)
- Also known as: TPMP
- Slogan: TV is only TV! (French: La télé c'est que de la télé !)
- Genre: Talk show
- Created by: Cyril Hanouna
- Developed by: Stéphanie Guedj (2013–2014); Florence Sebaoun; Julien Lalande (2013–2016); Romain Ambro (2015–2016); Maxime Riou (2016–2017); Émilie Lopez (2016–2017); Sarah Alboulkheir (2017); Pierre-Henri Fouchier (2018, 2023-2024); Théo Macel (2020-2023)
- Written by: Adrien Piquet-Gauthier (2011–2014); Benjamin Veyres (2012–2014); Pierre-Antoine Damecour (2013–2016); Fabien Didier (2014–2016); Benjamin Ifrah (2014–2016); Maxime Dormeau (2016–2017, 2020-); Cédric Cizaire (2016–2017, 2018-2019); Valentin Msika (2016–2017); Jean-Marc Nichanian (2017); Gaëtan Serais (2017); Keusmy (2017–2020); Fabien Delettres (2018-2023); Teddy Férent (2019-2020); Clément Bérut (2020); Kakoumbé (2020-); Adel Jamli (2020-)
- Presented by: Cyril Hanouna; Julien Courbet (2014–2017)
- Starring: Valérie Bénaïm; Benjamin Castaldi; Maxime Guény; Géraldine Maillet; Jean-Michel Maire; Bernard Montiel; Isabelle Morini-Bosc; Ludivine Rétory; Gilles Verdez; Beatrice Rosen
- Opening theme: Rinôçérôse – "Final Lap"
- Country of origin: France
- Original language: French
- No. of seasons: 11
- No. of episodes: 1,423

Production
- Executive producer: Julie Raynaud
- Producer: Cyril Hanouna
- Production locations: La Plaine Saint-Denis, Paris (2010–2012); Boulogne-Billancourt, Paris (2012–present)
- Camera setup: Multiple
- Running time: 125 minutes
- Production company: H_{2}O Productions

Original release
- Network: France 4 (2010–2012); D8/C8 (2012–2025); TPMP (2025)
- Release: April 1, 2010 – March 26, 2025

Related
- Morandini ! (2006–2012); Touche pas à mon sport !; Tout beau, tout neuf

Touche pas à mon poste! (TPMP), literally "Don't Touch My Television Set!", is a French live television talk show that ran from 2010 to 2025. First broadcast on France 4, it moved to D8 (which became C8) from 2012 until the network lost its license. It was produced by H2O Productions. Hosted by Cyril Hanouna, the show was controversial, generating record sanctions of €7.6 million.

== History ==
TPMP's Season 3 logo

Hanouna created "H2O Productions" in March 2010 to produce his own TV program. In 2010 he created the talk show "TPMP" which was first broadcast on France 4. In May 2012, Touche pas à mon poste! was transferred to the new channel, D8. The program offered a new formula, with new sequences led by Camille Combal, or Bertrand Chameroy accompanied by Nicolas Bouvard and occasionally Vincent Desagnat.

On July 24, 2024 Arcom announced the non-renewal of C8's digital terrestrial license, citing TPMP's various controversies over the years.

== Columnists (C8) ==
=== Current columnists ===
- Jean-Michel Maire (2010–present)
- Isabelle Morini-Bosc (2013–present)
- Gilles Verdez (2013–present)
- Kelly Vedovelli (2017–present)
- Valérie Bénaïm (2012–present)
- Géraldine Maillet (2016–present)
- Bernard Montiel (2014–present)
- Danielle Moreau (2017, 2018–present)
- Raymond Aabou (2017, 2018–present)
- Guillaume Genton (2017–present)
- Polska (2023–present)

=== Former columnists ===
- Beatrice Rosen (2022–2023, 2024)
- Benjamin Castaldi (2016–2023)
- Maxime Guény (2017–2024)
- Magali Berdah (2017–2020)
- Ludivine Rétory (2017–2021)
- Capucine Anav (2016–2017)
- Rachid Arhab (2017)
- Agathe Auproux (2017–2019)
- Nadège Beausson-Diagne (2014–2016)
- Nabilla Benattia (2014, 2018)
- Igor and Grichka Bogdanoff (2017)
- Booder (2018)
- Damien Canivez (2016–2017)
- Christophe Carrière (2010–2017)
- Sébastien Cauet (2016–2017)
- Bertrand Chameroy (2012–2016, 2018)
- Elise Chassaing (2012–2013)
- Camille Combal (2012–2018)
- Julien Courbet (2014–2018)
- Matthieu Delormeau (2015–2020)
- Estelle Denis (2015–2017)
- Miguel Derrenes (2014–2015)
- Rokhaya Diallo (2017–2018)
- Issa Doumbia (2015–2017)
- Dominique Farrugia (2017)
- Laurent Fontaine (2014)
- Justine Fraïoli (2011–2012, 2014–2016)
- Elodie Gossuin (2010–2012, 2014)
- Christine Kelly (2018–2019)
- Alexia Laroche-Joubert (2012–2013)
- Caroline Ithurbide (2015–2017)
- Annie Lemoine (2013)
- Jean-Luc Lemoine (2011–2018)
- Emilie Lopez (2015–2017)
- Angela Lorente (2015)
- Gérard Louvin (2012–2014, 2015)
- Énora Malagré (2010–2017)
- Emmanuel Maubert (2014–2015)
- Pierre Ménès (2017)
- Thierry Moreau (2010–2017)
- Erika Moulet (2015–2016)
- François Ouisse (2012–2013)
- Renaud Revel (2017)
- Nicolas Rey (2012–2013)
- La Fouine (2015)
- Titoff (2017–2018)
- Phillipe Vandel (2012–2014)
- François Viot (2010–2012, 2014–2017)
- Delphine Wespiser (2018–2023)

== Fines and actions ==
- In June 2017, the show was ordered to suspend all advertising for 3 weeks for two incriminating acts after the show "seriously disregarded its obligation to exercise restraint in the dissemination of images likely to humiliate people. and "misunderstood the provisions of the law of September 30, 1986 against stereotypes, sexist prejudices, degrading images and violence against women".
- In July 2017, the show was fined 3 million euros for a homophobic prank and "having resorted to numerous clichés and stereotypical attitudes about homosexual people". It is considered that by broadcasting this sequence, the company "has seriously disregarded the principle of respect for private life, as well as its obligation to fight against discrimination".
- In February 2020, the show was ordered to pay a fine of 10,000 euros to Karine Ferri after airing unauthorized nude images of her.
- In February 2021, the show was put on notice for invisible advertising.
- In November 2022, the show is put on notice for its coverage of the murder of Lola Daviet, where Cyril Hanouna called for the suspect of the murder to be executed without trial.

== Far-right support ==
Claire Sécail, a researcher at the French National Center for Scientific Research (CNRS) published a study showing that the program "massively" favored the far right during the 2022 French presidential election. As an example, Eric Zemmour, the far-right candidate who scored 7%, received 44% of the airtime on the show while Jean-Luc Mélenchon, the left-wing candidate who scored 21%, received only 1.2% of the airtime. The difference was not only in the airtime but also in the treatment accorded to the candidates, with far-right candidates all receiving privileged treatment while candidates from the left or Emmanuel Macron consistently receiving negative treatment.

The French Senate has opened an inquiry upon Touche pas à mon poste ! among other news networks that tried to promote far-right views.

== Guests ==
Usually, the show welcomes two guests. They are often journalists, singers, actors, hosts or humorists.

Some political personalities have participated to the show, such as: Jean-Luc Mélenchon, Najat Vallaud-Belkacem, Jack Lang and David Douillet.

The TV show has also welcomed international celebrities like Jermaine Jackson, Cher, James Blunt, Eva Longoria, Anastacia, Gary Dourdan, Conchita Wurst, Lenny Kravitz, Nicole Scherzinger, Vanessa Hudgens, Tokio Hotel, Seal, Sacha Baron Cohen, Julian Perretta and the comedians of Violetta.

American singer Cris Cab participated in a film clip in June with Tefa (who used to be TPMP's DJ). He appeared on the show in 2015 to sing his cover of "English Man in New York" live. Meanwhile, Canadian singer Justin Bieber, participated in a sequence where he was interviewed by Cyril Hanouna (Cyril gave Justin his jacket as a present but forgot his credit card in it; he later said that he really left it in the jacket and that it wasn't a joke).

== Audience ==
On 22 April 2010, less than a month after its launch, TPMP had already garnered success for a show airing on a small TV channel like France 4, as 226,000 people were watching it regularly.

In December 2012, the TV show was watched by 700,000 people regularly on D8.

On 29 January 2016, 1,975,000 watched the TV program, the show's historic audience record. That day, Cyril and his team hosted Bénabar and Pascal Demolon.

Audience records's table
Channel	Date	Average audience		References
Channel	Date	People watching the show	PDM	References
D8 (C8)	13 June 2013	670,000	6.2%	
D8 (C8)	29 February 2016	1,975,000	8.1%	
D8 (C8)	21 April 2016	2,047,000	9.7%	
D8 (C8)	29 January 2016	1,234,000	5.7%	

=== Prime-time program ===
channel	Season	Date	Special program	Recorded or live	Duration	average audience		Ref
channel	Season	Date	Special program	Recorded or live	Duration	people watching it	PDM	Ref
France 4	2	19 January 2011	Touche pas à mon poste : on refait 2010	Recorded	2:00	337,000	1.4%	
D8	4	27 December 2012	Touche pas à mon top !	Recorded	1:40	840,000	3.5%	
D8	4	3 January 2013	Touche pas à mon top !	Recorded	1:35	805,000	3.1%	
D8	4	5 March 2013	Touche pas à ma Nouvelle Star !	Live	2:50	755,000	3.8%	
D8	4	23 April 2013	Touche pas à mon Patrick Bruel !	Live	2:05	889,000	3.7%	
D8	4	30 May 2013	Touche pas à mes années 2000 !	Recorded	2:05	1,158,000	5.0%	
D8	4	14 June 2013	Touche pas à mes années 90 !	Live	2:10	1,127,000	5.5%	
D8	4	27 June 2013	Touche pas à mes jeux télés ! (1st édition)	Live	1:50	1,208,000	5.3%	
D8	5	10 October 2013	Touche pas à mes parodies !	Recorded	1:45	977,000	4.2%	
D8	5	8 November 2013	Touche pas à mes directs !	Live	2:00	1,166,000	5.1%	
D8	5	6 March 2014	Touche pas à mon Ardisson !	Recorded	2:15	946,000	4.4%	
D8	5	25 April 2014	Touche pas à mes jeux télés ! (2nd édition)	Recorded	1:30	1,290,000	5.7%	
D8	5	27 June 2014	TPMP refait l'année ! (1st édition)	Live	2:40	1,573,000	8.6%	
D8	6	2 October 2014	Touche pas à mon public !	Live	2:10	1,150,000	5.5%	
D8	6	20 November 2014	Touche pas à mes héros !	Live	2:20	1,257,000	6.1%	
D8	6	28 January 2015	Touche pas à mon prime !	Live	2:00	1,213,000	5.5%	
D8	6	18 March 2015	Touche pas à mon prime ! Spécial Jeux Japonais	Live	1:45	1,029,000	4.6%	
D8	6	2 April 2015	Touche pas à mon poste ! Les 5 ans !	Live	2:20	1,495,000	6.9%	
D8	6	4 June 2015	Touche pas à mon prime ! Spécial Aventure	Live	2:10	1,006,000	5.1%	
D8	6	2 July 2015	TPMP refait l'année ! (2nd édition)	Live	2:45	1,519,000	7.9%	
D8	7	8 October 2015	TPMP ! Les 3 ans de D8	Live	2:30	1,395,000	6.8%	
D8	7	20 November 2015	Touche pas à mon poste ! C'est que de l'amour !*	Live	2:45	1,679,000	8.4%	
D8	7	17 December 2015	Touche pas à mon prime ! Spécial Noël	Live	2:50	1,770,000	8.3%	
D8	7	28 January 2016	Touche pas à mon prime ! Faites vos vœux	Live	2:40	1,885,000 (2,047,000 à J+7)	8.9% (9.1% à J+7)	
D8	7	14 March 2016	Touche pas à mon poste ! Le prime de la vérité	Live	2:50	1,113,000	5.5%	
D8	7	21 April 2016	TPMP Spécial Las Vegas ! Very Baba Trip	Live	2:50	2,032,000	9.7%	
D8	7	19 May 2016	Touche pas à mon Olympia !	Live	2:50	1,473,000	7.3%	
C8	8	20 January 2017	TPMP part au ski !	Live	3:30	1,500,500	7.3%<	

Originally, the 20 November 2015 program was having a paranormal theme, but that program has been replaced by a special program to honor the victims of the terrorist attacks of 13 November 2015 in France (Touche pas à mon poste! it's only love). Finally, the program based on the paranormal is broadcast live in access prime time. Apart from the special program "Touche pas à mon poste ! it's only love" all the emission were cancelled.

==== Special programs ====
None of these were presented by Cyril Hanouna

Channel	Season	Date	presenters	Special program	Recorded or live	Duration	Audience		Ref
Channel	Season	Date	presenters	Special program	Recorded or live	Duration	people watching it	PDM	Ref
D8	5	27 December 2013	Valérie Bénaïm	2013 au poste !	Recorded	1:30	966,000	3.9%	
D8	5	30 May 2014	Chroniqueurs de TPMP	Les animaux du poste !	Recorded	1:45	539,000	2.6%	
D8	6	23 December 2013	Julien Courbet	2014 au poste !	Recorded	2:00	708,000	2.9%	
D8	6	16 January 2015	Camille Combal	Le poste de surveillance de Camille Combal (Part 1)	Recorded	1:45	913,000	3.9%	
D8	6	30 January 2015	Jean-Luc Lemoine	Le Meilleur des 4/3 de Jean-Luc Lemoine (Part 1)	Recorded	2:15	1,054,000	5.0%	
D8	6	28 May 2015	Bertrand Chameroy	Le Journal de Bertrand Chameroy (Part 1)	Recorded	2:00	665,000	3.1%	
D8	7	3 September 2015	Jean-Luc Lemoine	Le meilleur des 4/3 de Jean-Luc Lemoine (Part 2)	Recorded	2:15	782,000	4.0%	
D8	7	3 December 2015	Bertrand Chameroy	Le Journal de Bertrand Chameroy (Part 2)	Recorded	2:20	677,000	3.3%	
D8	7	29 December 2015	Valérie Bénaïm	2015 au poste !	Recorded	1:30	687,000	3.1%	
D8	7	31 March 2016	Bertrand Chameroy	Le Journal de Bertrand Chameroy (Part 3)	Recorded	2:00	541,000	2.6%	
D8	7	14 April 2016	Camille Combal	Camille Combal dans la rue	Recorded	2:00	968,000	4.4%	
D8	7	12 May 2016	Camille Combal	Le Meilleur du Poste de Surveillance	Recorded	2:00	767,000	4.2%	
D8	7	3 June 2016	Jean-Luc Lemoine	Le meilleur des 4/3 de Jean-Luc Lemoine (Part 3)	Recorded	2:20			

== International versions ==
Country	Local title	Network(s)	Host(s)	Premiere
France (original format)	Touche pas à mon poste !	France 4 (2010–2012); D8 (2012–2016); C8 (2016–2025)	Cyril Hanouna; Julien Courbet	April 1, 2010
Algeria	J8; اليوم الثامن	Echourouk TV	Farah Yasmine Nia	2017
Belgium (French)	Touche pas à mon poste !	Plug RTL	Cyril Hanouna; Julien Courbet	September 2, 2013
Italy	Sbandati	Rai 2	Gigi & Ross	October 4, 2016
Jordan	Hakina; حكينا	Ro'ya TV	Muath Eissa	2019
Lebanon	Menna w Jerr; منا و جر	MTV	Pierre Rabbat	December 31, 2015
Tunisia	Omour Jeddia; أمور جدية	El Hiwar Ettounsi	—N/a	2016

== Awards ==
2015: Prize-winner of the best entertainment show (ceremony of the gold price of the TNT)

== Bibliography ==
- Granier, Jean-Maxence (2014). Hanouna, un air du temps télévisuel (in French). Paris: Esprit. pp. 132–136 – via Carin.
- Cormann, Grégory (2016). L'info version Hanouna. La satire télévisée par le tout petit bout de l'écran (in French). Liège: Culture, le Magazine Culturel de l'Université de Liège.
