= Vincent Bolloré =

French businessman (born 1952)

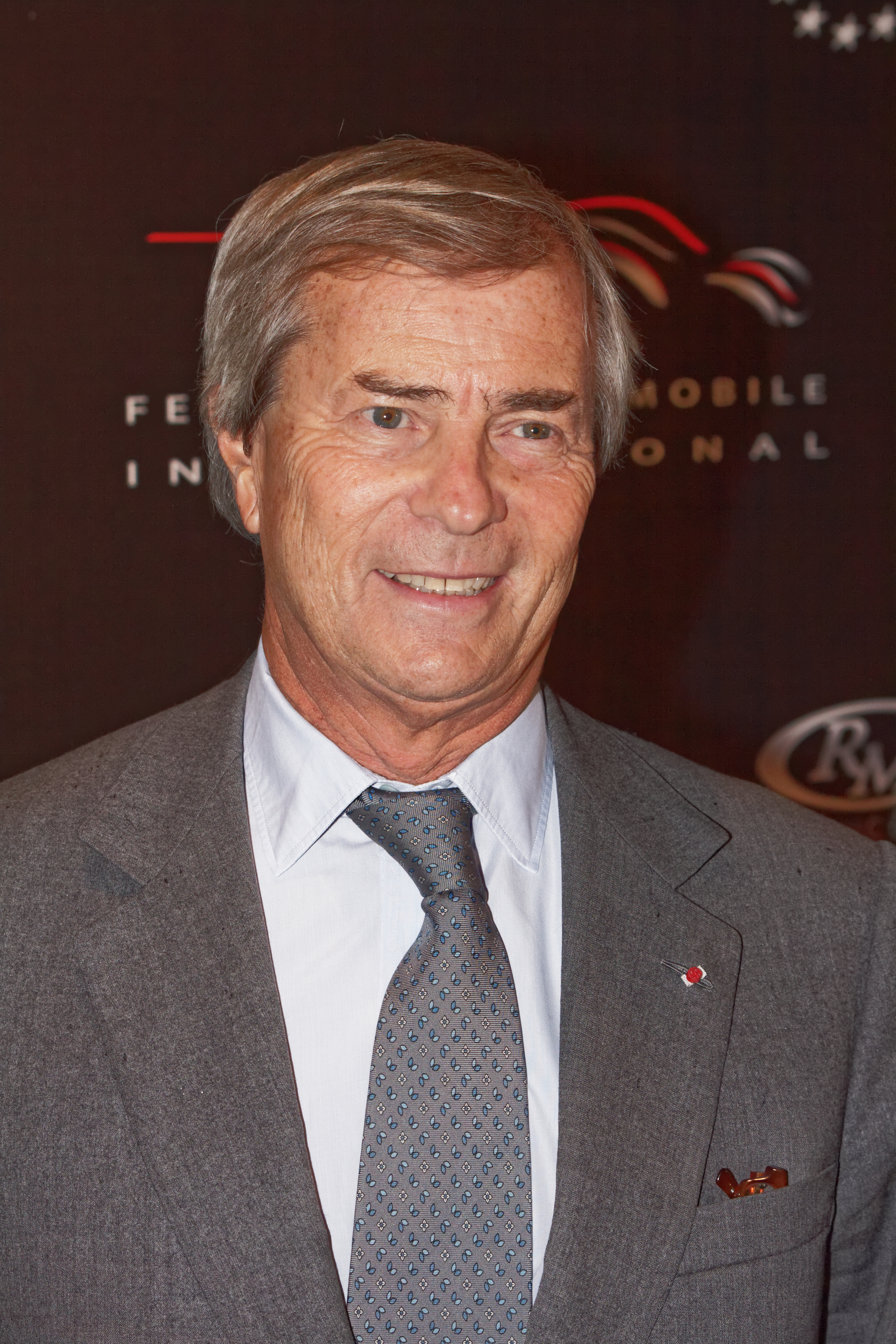
- Bolloré in 2014
- Born: Vincent Marie Claude Bolloré; 1 April 1952 (age 74); Boulogne-Billancourt, France
- Education: Lycée Janson-de-Sailly; Paris Nanterre University
- Occupation: Businessman
- Title: Chairman and CEO, Bolloré
- Spouse: Sophie Fossorier (m. 1972; div. 2004)
- Partner: Anaïs Jeanneret (2014–2021)
- Children: 4, including Yannick
- Family: Bolloré family

Vincent Marie Claude Bolloré (French pronunciation: [vɛ̃sɑ̃ bɔlɔʁe]; born 1 April 1952) is a French billionaire businessman. He was the chairman and CEO of the investment group Bolloré until his retirement from the family business in 2022. In January 2025, his net worth was estimated at US$9.9 billion. Much of his fortune derives from transport and logistics in Africa, as well as corporate raiding. Bolloré has been accused of using his wealth and control of media companies (including Vivendi and Canal+) to push a far-right agenda in France, as well as to suppress criticism of his companies' human rights records. He has plead guilty to corruption in relation to his business in Africa as part of a plea deal, though the deal was rejected and is the subject of an ongoing criminal trial.

== Early life and education ==
Bolloré was born on 1 April 1952 in Boulogne-Billancourt. He is the son of industrialist Michel Bolloré and Monique Follot, daughter of aviator and industrialist Henri Follot and Nicole Goldschmidt. The friendship of his maternal grandmother Nicole Goldsmith with Edmond de Rothschild and the parents of Antoine Bernheim (himself very close to Vincent Bolloré's aunt) is credited by the magazine Le Point as the explanation for "why these "fairy godparents" of the financial establishment took a very close interest in the destiny of the young heir". He attended the Lycée Janson-de-Sailly, before graduating with a law degree from Université Paris Nanterre. Bolloré started his career as an investment bank trainee at Edmond de Rothschild.

== Career ==
Bolloré's personal investment career began when he took over at his family-controlled conglomerate Bolloré, which deals in maritime freight and African trade, and paper manufacturing (cigarette and bible paper). Bolloré employs 33,000 people worldwide. He is a well-known corporate raider in France who has succeeded in making money by taking large stakes in French listed companies, in particular the building and construction group Bouygues, where he left with a sizeable capital gain after a power struggle. He pulled a similar move with French video game company Ubisoft, owning an approximate 27% stake in the company in 2016, before Ubisoft president Yves Guillemot maneuvered a deal to have a coalition of Tencent, among other companies, to buy out Bolloré's shares for about $2.45 billion.

In late 2004, his investment group started building a stake in advertising group Havas, becoming its largest single shareholder. He mounted a coup and replaced Alain de Pouzilhac as CEO in July 2005. In 2005, through his family company, he expanded his media interests by launching the Direct 8 television station. Towards the end of 2005, he began building a stake in independent British media planning and buying group, Aegis. As of July 2006, his stake in Aegis stood at 29%. Direct Soir, a free newspaper, was launched in June 2006. The newspaper, along with Matin Plus, the free morning edition also run by the Bolloré Group, was criticized for presenting an overly rosy picture of African leaders who partnered with Bolloré's conglomerate. In November 2010, the administrative court of Paris ordered an immediate end to the contract between the RATP and the Bolloré Group allowing the latter to distribute Direct Matin and Direct Soir using newsracks in the Paris subway. The following month Direct Soir ceased publication, due to the evening return from work being spread out over several hours, in contrast to the morning rush hour when papers could be handed out more efficiently.

In January 2008, he showed interest in becoming a shareholder of famed, but troubled, Italian car manufacturer Pininfarina. In 2014, as Vivendi president he decided to invest in the Italian telecom company Telecom Italia and in the Italian broadcaster Mediaset, controlled by Berlusconi family's holding company Fininvest. The Bolloré Group also has important positions in the economies of several former French colonies in Africa (in particular Ivory Coast, Gabon, Cameroon, and Congo).

As a result of the Universal Music Group IPO at Euronext Amsterdam, Bolloré came to hold 18 percent of UMG shares. He officially retired as chair of the family business on 17 February 2022.

== Personal life ==
Bolloré married Sophie Fossorier in 1977 with whom he has four children, including Yannick. In the mid-1990s, he separated from his wife and started a relationship with one of Sophie's sisters. Sophie and Bolloré's divorce was finalised in 2004. He was the brother-in-law of politician Gérard Longuet. In 2021, Bolloré was the companion of Anaïs Jeanneret, a French writer. He is a close personal friend of former French President Nicolas Sarkozy. It has been said that their friendship goes back over 20 years. Sarkozy has been criticized for accepting vacations from Bolloré, as was president Georges Pompidou with his father, Michel Bolloré. They have both stated that no conflict of interest exists.

== Media engagement and influence ==
According to the Financial Times, Bolloré views the French media establishment as too left-wing, and has sought to use his wealth to create a right-wing media empire. While prior to the early 2020s Bolloré used his empire to support a centre-right stance, since the early 2020s, Bolloré has increasingly embraced far-right causes and figures. Bolloré was described in July 2024 as "a vocal supporter of Marine Le Pen's hard-right party", the National Rally.

Bolloré has been investing massively in media for several years. He is the main shareholder of the Vivendi media group, which holds a 10-percent stake in Universal Music Group (Bolloré himself owns directly another 18%) in addition to numerous TV stations and newspapers. Bolloré hence controls Canal+ S.A., which includes channels like Canal+, C8, and CNews. In 2022 he has also bought the largest private radio station in France, Europe 1 in time for the 2022 French presidential election. A 2022 essay in The New York Times highlighted Bolloré's media influence, noting the prominence given to far-right, "proto-fascist" politician Éric Zemmour by television news channel CNews. CNews has been compared to having a similar role in the French Media landscape that Fox News does in the United States. CNews subsequently hired Xenia Fedorova, former head of Russia Today in France, who was later expelled by the French government for being a "Kremlin propagandist". Following his acquisition of media companies, Bolloré is known for forcing changes in the media group's output/coverage to favour his political agenda, firing staff who oppose him or disagree with him ideologically, and replacing them with people who share his views. Reporters Without Borders have denounced Bolloré's "repeated attacks on press freedom and the independence of newsrooms" as an "unprecedented threat to democracy".

Bolloré also acquires a reputation for suing journalists in left-leaning media in response to articles criticising his influence. In April 2016, Bolloré launched a defamation lawsuit against the newspaper Bastamag, which had described "catastrophic" human rights conditions on plantations in Liberia affiliated with Bolloré's companies, where "children under 14" were working. In January 2021, Bolloré and two other Bolloré executives pleaded guilty at a Paris court for supplying €370,000 worth of communication services to President of Togo, Faure Gnassingbé, during his presidential campaigns. Bolloré attempted to deny the charges at first, but his defense was "turned against him" instead, which caused him to admit his guilt despite initial denial.

Bolloré also controls the publishing houses Hachette, Fayard, and Grasset. Accusing him of pushing far-right ideas, more than 100 writers quit Grasset in 2026 when it was acquired by Bolloré.

Bolloré and his affiliated news outlets also assisted in the formation of, and promoted (respectively) the Union of the Far-Right alliance between members of The Republicans and the National Rally for the 2024 French legislative election.

In 2024, Bolloré was part of a consortium that acquired the Paris School of Journalism.

Starting in September 2022, Bolloré's channel C8 was the subject of several controversies concerning its integrity, evidence being found that the presenters and guests on the channel were being ordered what to say. The inflammatory language used in its program TPMP was criticised, with the channel being sanctioned €3.5M for having publicly insulted a France Insoumise (a left-wing party) member of Parliament (MP). The insults were directed at the MP right after the MP described Bolloré as one of the ultra wealthy people who made the French suffer in poverty and stated that Bolloré's businesses caused deforestation.

In May 2026, more than 600 French actors, directors, and other film workers, including Juliette Binoche, signed an open letter against Bolloré’s growing power in the French film industry. They warned that his control over media and film companies like Canal+ and StudioCanal could lead to a “fascist takeover of the collective imagination” and harm the freedom of French cinema. Later, international stars such as Javier Bardem, Mark Ruffalo, or Ken Loach also joined this open letter.

== Legal issues ==
On 24 April 2018, Bolloré was brought into custody for questioning concerning perceived links between discount rates for political consulting (through Havas) and port concessions in Lomé, Togo; and Conakry, Guinea. He was subsequently indicted for "corruption of foreign agents", "falsification of documents", and "complicity in breach of trust". If found guilty, he could face a maximum fine of €1 million and up to 10 years' imprisonment. In 2021 as part of a plea bargain, Bolloré plead guilty to corruption regarding the port contracts in Togo and Guinea in exchange for a fine. However later French court rulings regarded this as too lenient, and in 2024 a court ruled that the charge should be subject to a criminal trial. On 19 March 2026, Le Monde and Mediapart reported that Bolloré was brought to trial to face corruption charges.
