= Jean-Pierre Foucault =

French television and radio host (born 1947)

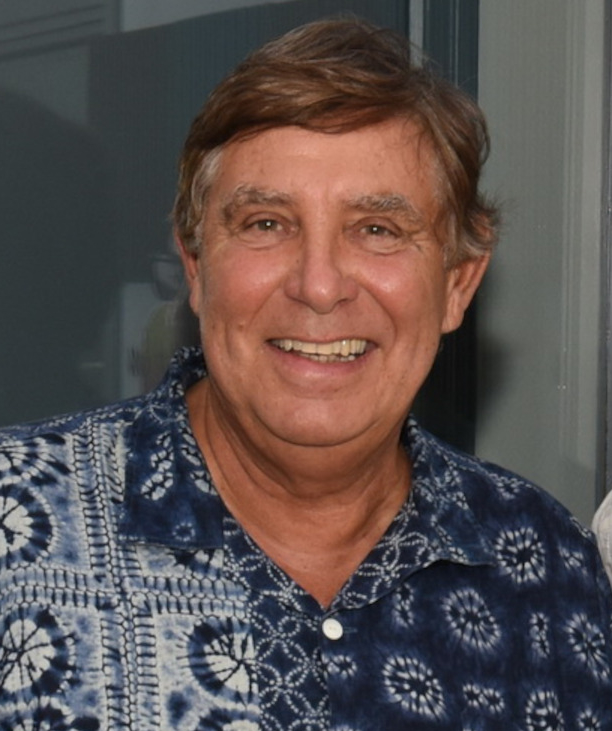
- Foucault in 2018
- Born: 23 November 1947 (age 78); Marseille, France
- Occupations: Television and radio presenter

Jean-Pierre Foucault (French pronunciation: [ʒɑ̃pjɛʁ fuko]; born 23 November 1947) is a French television and radio host. He was the host of Qui veut gagner des millions?, the French version of Who Wants to Be a Millionaire?, and of Zone Rouge, the French version of The Chair. He has been hosting the Miss France pageant since 1996 and hosted the Miss Europe pageant in 2003, 2005 and 2006.

Foucault played himself in the 2006 film Mon Meilleur Ami directed by Patrice Leconte and starring Dany Boon as a taxi driver who wins the top prize in Qui veut gagner des millions ?

Foucault was born in Marseille to a Jewish mother. He shares his life with Évelyne Jarre without being married. He has a daughter from a previous marriage, Virginie Foucault.

== Radio ==
- 2006–2014: La Bonne Touche with Cyril Hanouna (2006–2011) on RTL
- 2014–2016: Les pieds dans le plat on Europe 1

== Filmography ==
- 2000: Most Promising Young Actress, directed by Gérard Jugnot: Himself

| Preceded by Jalaluddin Hassan | Host of Who Wants to Be a Millionaire? 3 July 2000 | Succeeded by Tantowi Yahya |
