= C8 (French TV channel) =

Former French free-to-air television channel

- Country: France
- Broadcast area: France, Belgium, Switzerland (local feed), Africa

Programming
- Language: French
- Picture format: 1080i HDTV (downscaled to 16:9 576i for the SDTV feed)

Ownership
- Owner: Bolloré (2005–2012); Canal+ (2012–2025)
- Sister channels: Canal+ CStar; CNews

History
- Launched: March 31, 2005; 20 years ago
- Founder: Vincent Bolloré; Philippe Labro
- Closed: March 1, 2025; 12 months ago
- Former names: Direct 8 (2005–2012); D8 (2012–2016)

Links
- Website: canalplus.com/chaines/c8

Availability

Terrestrial
- TNT: Channel 8
- Easy TV (Congo): Channel 18

C8 (pronounced [se ɥit]) was a French free-to-air television channel owned by the Bolloré group. Initially named Direct 8, it was renamed D8 after it was sold to Canal+ in 2012, and later renamed C8 in 2016. A subsidiary of the Canal+ group, Vincent Bolloré was its main shareholder.

== History ==
The Direct 8 project was founded on 24 July 2001, date in which the CSA launches a call for offers to interested companies having a channel in the upcoming digital terrestrial television platform, a new mode of broadcasting increasing the number of available channels. Vincent Bolloré presented the Direct 8 in front of the CSA, which received support, and he agreed for a broadcast license on 23 October 2002.

Direct 8 was launched on 31 March 2005. On 7 October 2012, it was renamed D8. Vincent Bolloré would take control of Canal+ in 2015.

D8 changed its name to C8 on 5 September 2016, as announced by Vincent Bolloré.

C8 launched in Belgium on 28 April 2020; the station previously did not air in the country as Plug RTL held the rights to its spotlight programme, Touche pas à mon poste ! until that date.

=== License renewal rejection and wind-down of network ===
On 24 July 2024, Arcom announced that it would not renew C8's DTT frequency, following a number of fines imposed by the regulator amid many controversies around Touche pas à mon poste !, and the channel announced that it would appeal to the Conseil d'État. Its first application for interim relief, challenging the list of shortlisted candidates for the allocation of DTT frequencies, was rejected in September 2024, and its first application on the merits was declared inadmissible as premature on the following 22 November. On 8 December 2024, the group announced the loss of 150 jobs as a direct result of this non-renewal. On 16 December 2024, Arcom issued its refusal decision, which was again contested on the merits and in summary proceedings by the channel. On 30 December 2024, the Conseil d'Etat rejected the second application for interim relief, ruling that the condition of urgency had not been met, and specifying that the appeal on the merits would be examined in a few weeks' time, before the contested decision was implemented at the end of February.

In 2024, C8 was a candidate for the renewal of its authorization to broadcast on national channel 8 of the French digital terrestrial television platform, set to expire on 28 February 2025.

Among the elements that led to the decision of the media authority made public in February 2025, Arcom highlighted the failure of C8 concerning its obligations to offer programming mainly composed of entertainment and magazine shows; and lack of diversity in its schedule, including "the nightly reading program constitutes more than a quarter of the magazine offering". Furthermore, the fiction offering, estimated at 1,700 hours by year, was not original and almost systematically exploited the rebroadcasting of series previously offered by other channels. Arcom also noted that C8 did not respect its request to abandon live broadcast of Touche pas à mon poste !, presented by Cyril Hanouna, without providing a written commitment defining the terms, while the latter has accumulated a record 7.6 million euros in fines for his excesses. Arcom also recalled during its hearing of C8 for the renewal of its frequency that the channel had been fined a total of 7,610,001 euros in the previous 8 years, which is the first. Most of the sanctions were due to the program Touche pas à mon poste !. The organization of the channel had never changed to stop the misconduct despite Arcom's reminders to the channels concerning, among other things, their obligations regarding pluralism of information, control of the antenna, advertising, and broadcasting. L'informé reported in July 2024 that the channel had never generated any profit, and that the amount of its losses since 2005 amounted to 736 million euros.

An unlikely solution considered by experts in the audiovisual sector, C8 could nevertheless survive despite its cessation of broadcasting through the DTT, by exploiting other distribution networks of the Canal+ group, notably via the internet.

C8, alongside NRJ 12, is the third French national private channel to see its broadcasting authorisation removed, after TV6 in 1987 then La Cinq in 1992, following its bankruptcy. After the 1st of March 2025, a temporary static message « LA CHAÎNE C8 A CESSÉ D’ÉMETTRE » would be shown on TV until the 6th of June. (Depending on operators, the message will vary. The new channel 8 would be LCP-AN / Public Sénat. From the 6th of June and onwards.

The network wound down on 28 February 2025 after a showing of the 2019 American film Unplanned, a film which had caused controversy during its original airing on C8 on 15 August 2021, due to its views against abortion (the network had already been fined €100,000 by Arcom in November for a program alleging that abortion was the world's leading cause of death).

== Programmes ==
=== Entertainment ===
- Touche pas à mon poste !, presented by Cyril Hanouna
- Voyage au bout de la nuit, night reading of famous literary works by actors (show named after the eponymous novel)
- Domino Day, presented by Valérie Bénaïm
- Le Grand Bêtisier, presented by Justine Fraioli & Caroline Ithurbide
- Le Zap
- La folle soirée du Palmashow

=== Game shows ===
- L'Œuf ou la Poule ?, presented by Sebastien Cauet
- Le Grand Match, presented by Valérie Bénaïm
- Still Standing, presented by Julien Courbet
- Guess My Age, presented by Jean-Luc Lemoine
- Hold Up!, presented by Benjamin Castaldi
- Big Buzz Quiz, presented by Benjamin Castaldi
- Couple ou pas couple ?, presented by Jean-Luc Lemoine
- Strike, presented by Vincent Lagaf'

=== Infotainment ===
- Focus, presented by Guy Lagache
- Les Mystères, presented by Cécile de Ménibus
- Au cœur de l'enquête, presented by Adrienne de Malleray
- Histoire interdite, presented by Guy Lagache

=== Talk shows ===
- C8 le JT, presented by Émilie Besse
- Langue de bois s'abstenir, presented by Philippe Labro
- La Nouvelle Édition, presented by Daphné Bürki
- Salut les Terriens !, presented by Thierry Ardisson

=== Lifestyle ===
- Les Animaux de la 8, presented by Élodie Ageron and Sandrine Arcizet
- À vos régions, presented by Grégory Galiffi
- À vos recettes, presented by Grégory Galiffi

== See also ==
- Canal+ S.A.-formerly known as Canal+ Group
- Direct 8
- Canal Star
