= Cyril Hanouna =

French radio and television presenter (born 1974)

- Born: Cyril Valéry Isaac Hanouna; 23 September 1974 (age 52); Paris, France
- Other name: Baba
- Occupations: Broadcaster, writer, actor, comedian, singer
- Known for: Touche pas à mon poste !

Cyril Valéry Isaac Hanouna (French pronunciation: [siʁil valeʁi izaak anuna]; Arabic: سيريل فاليري إسحاق حنونة; born 23 September 1974) is a French radio and television presenter, writer, author, columnist, producer, singer and occasional actor and comedian of Tunisian origin. He hosts the French TV show Touche pas à mon poste !

== Early life ==
Hanouna was born into a Jewish family, the son of a general practitioner and a clothing shopkeeper who had both arrived in France from Tunis in 1969. Like his father, Hanouna first chose medical studies. Having experienced academic difficulties in high school, he decided to study management with the goal of becoming a certified accountant, but later abandoned his studies.

== Career ==
=== Highlights ===
Hanouna made his television debut in 1999 on the TV channel Comédie+, where he composed the texts for its trailers. Hanouna became a television presenter in 2002 when he co-hosted the third series of La Grosse Émission alongside the comedy duo Kad et Olivier. In February 2002 he was approached by RTL Radio and he hosted a radio show called Planet Arthur alongside Manu Levy and Valérie Bénaïm. In 2003 he hosted the morning show Morning Live on M6.

Since 2008, Hanouna has been associated with the Eurovision Song Contest. At the 2008 contest, he presented the French tele-votes and provided the French commentary for the 2009 and 2010 contests alongside Julien Courbet and Stéphane Bern.

Currently, Hanouna is affiliated with Europe 1 TV and a host of its program Touche Pas à Mon Poste. Until 2012, it was seen on France 4 before moving with its entire production team to D8 with a 7 October launch. The channel also bought the rights for Nouvelle Star, the French version of the Pop Idol series, and Hanouna became its regular host. In 2011, he acted in the third installment of La Vérité si je mens !.

Hanouna is presently the producer of his own entertainment company, H_{2}O Productions, where he works on some of the most popular TV shows on France's channel C8 (as D8 has been renamed). He is also active on almost all TV channels owned by Vincent Bolloré (Direct 8, Direct Star and Canal+). In 2015 Bolloré spent 250 million euros to retain Hanouna.

In 2019, and in reaction to the French yellow vests movement, Hanouna proposed a television show to be co-hosted by a French politician that would seek to address the everyday concerns of French citizens.

On 12 November 2023, he took part in the March for the Republic and Against Antisemitism in Paris in response to the rise of anti-Semitism in France since the start of the Gaza war.

In May 2025, he announced the creation of his own communications agency, "Chapchak".

=== Controversies ===
Cyril Hanouna has often received satirical awards from Gérards de la Télévision: Industrial Mistake Award 2007, Worst Presenter 2013 and 2014, The Presenter Who Doesn't Need Drugs 2016. In February 2016, he was drawn by Charlie Hebdo as a mosquito sucking out children's brains.

He is described as an annoying clown, switching from hysterical chuckles to vulgarities, and is involved in several affairs such as offering non-existent gifts, ripping a book during a broadcast, humiliating journalists and collaborators and making sexist and homophobic jokes. In February 2016 French journalists Julien Cazarre and Arnaud Ramsay reported that they received threats from Hanouna when they refused to appear on his show. Society magazine compiled a long report about him, describing him as "tyrannical, pretentious, full of anger," managing his team with "unscrupulous practices, temper tantrums, and threats", based on anonymous reports by colleagues. Stéphane Guillon, another Canal+ presenter, describes Hanouna as the "Kim Jong-Il of C8".

In November and December 2016, the Conseil supérieur de l'audiovisuel (CSA) launched two administrative procedures against Touche Pas a Mon Poste because of frequent humiliations and sexist and homophobic statements during the broadcast. In one segment of the show, Hanouna posted a fake gay dating profile online using a torso picture of gay model Max Emerson and mocked the men who responded to the profile while he was live on air. The segment triggered nearly 20,000 complaints to regulators and condemnation from LGBT groups.

In two decisions in 2016, sanctions were leveled on C8 by the CSA, requiring the network to suspend advertising during the program "Touche pas à mon poste" for a period on one-week (3 Nov 2016) and a period of two weeks (7 Dec 2016). In November 2019, the first advertising suspension was deemed unjustified by the Conseil d'État, which condemned the CSA to pay C8 a record €1.1m in lost advertising revenues. In 2017, the CSA levied a record €3m fine for the "baba hotline" segment. The Conseil d'État upheld the two-week advertising suspension and the €3m fine.

In December 2016, the French association of LGBT journalists counted 42 sexist and homophobic jokes, and describes him as an unapologetic promoter of homophobia.

=== Political influence ===
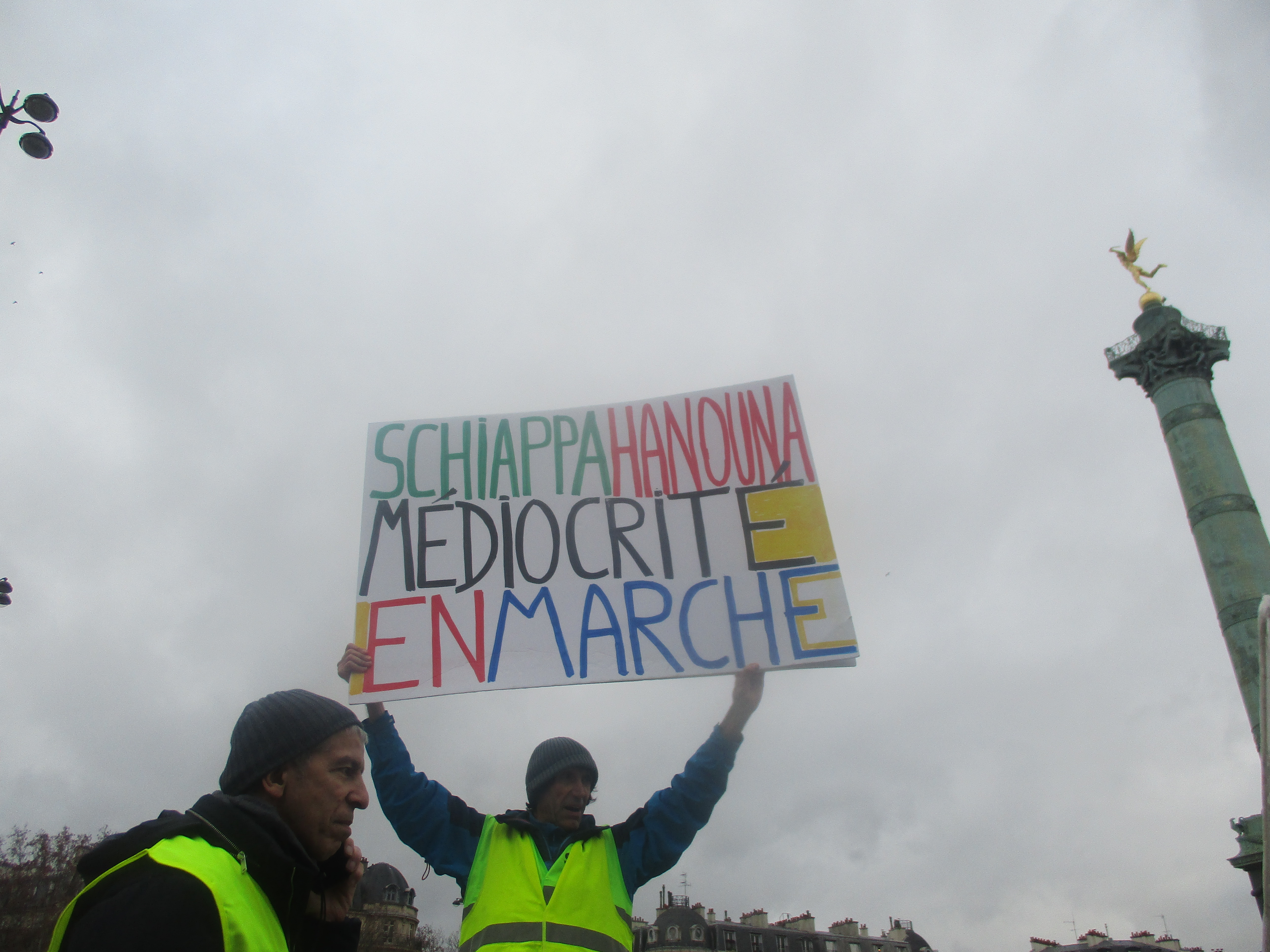
Anti-Macron poster mentioning Hanouna and Marlène Schiappa held by a Yellow Vest at Place de la Bastille in Paris (January 26, 2019)

Several journalists have noted the proximity between Cyril Hanouna and the government of Emmanuel Macron, with close associates of the president regularly appearing on the show Touche pas à mon poste. France Inter journalist Sonia Devillers places Cyril Hanouna within the "media arm of Macronism".

Several media outlets analyzed the political orientation of his show starting in 2021 in the run-up to the 2022 French presidential election: the far-right became the most represented political trend on the set, with the invitation of particularly radical figures without any opposing viewpoints. The announcement of Éric Zemmour's candidacy thus transformed the show, according to CNRS researcher Claire Sécail, into a platform serving the far-right candidate, who accumulated more than 40% of the show's political airtime (ahead of Emmanuel Macron at 25%, followed by Marine Le Pen). The far-right as a whole (Zemmour, Le Pen, Philippot, Dupont-Aignan) held a majority with 51.1% of the total airtime. Zemmour appeared on his new show Face à Baba, where he interviews a political candidate, on 16 December 2021, despite Hanouna having stated a few years earlier that he would never host him.

In June 2024, during the early legislative elections, Hanouna hosted a two-week show on Europe 1, owned by conservative billionaire Vincent Bolloré, dedicated to commentary on the ongoing campaign. Titled On marche sur la tête (We're in over our heads), the show received a warning from the ARCOM, reminding the station of its obligation to "treat electoral news with restraint and honesty" and the need to comply with "the requirement of pluralism in information as it follows". Indeed, many observers noted the political asymmetry in the invited personalities and the overrepresentation of the far-right, with the first episode featuring Béziers Mayor Robert Ménard, former prime minister Manuel Valls, National Rally MEP Matthieu Valet, and Reconquête! President Éric Zemmour.

== Discography ==
=== Singles ===
Year	Album	Peak positions	Certification
Year	Album	FR	Certification
2015	"Bogda Bogdanov"	34	
2016	"Petit Baba Noel"	2	

== Filmography ==
- 2012 : Soda (TV series): the lover (1 episode)
- 2012 : Would I Lie to You? 3 : Hervé Cockpit
- 2015 : The New Adventures of Aladdin : Radio speaker
- 2016 : Pattaya : the casting director
- 2016 : One Man and His Cow : himself
- 2016 : Sausage Party :Kareem Abdul Lavash (French dub)
- 2019 : Huge in France (TV series) : Himself
- 2025 : Guru : Himself

== Radio ==
- 2006–2011: La Bonne Touche with Jean-Pierre Foucault on RTL
- 2011–2013: Hanouna, le matin on Virgin Radio
- 2013–2016: Les pieds dans le plat on Europe 1
- 2024–2025: On marche sur la tête on Europe 1
- 2025: Tout beau tout fun on Fun Radio
