= Direct 8 =

French national TV network

- Country: France
- Broadcast area: France
- Network: Direct Star (48%)
- Headquarters: Puteaux, France

Programming
- Language: French
- Picture format: 576i (SDTV); 1080i (HDTV)

Ownership
- Owner: Bolloré Group

History
- Launched: 31 March 2005
- Founder: Vincent Bolloré; Philippe Labro
- Closed: 7 October 2012
- Replaced by: D8

Links
- Website: www.direct8.fr

Availability

Terrestrial
- TNT: Channel 8

Direct 8 was a national French television channel, owned by Vincent Bolloré. It was available through digital terrestrial television network and the Astra 1H satellite position.

As the name suggests ('direct' is French for 'live'), Direct 8 was originally intended to broadcast live shows only (except during night times and holiday seasons). This is no longer the case.

Following its purchase by Canal Group, the channel was rebranded on 7 October 2012 and relaunched as D8.

== See also ==
- C8
