= Bolloré (surname) =

Bolloré is a surname derived from bod which means bush and lore which means laurel in Breton.

Notable people with the surname include:

- Gwenn-Aël Bolloré (1925–2001), French soldier, businessman, author, and publisher
- Thierry Bolloré (born 1963), French executive
- Vincent Bolloré (born 1952), French industrialist, corporate raider and businessman
- Yannick Bolloré (born 1980), French businessman, son of Vincent Bolloré
