= Bolloré family =

French business family from Brittany

The Bolloré family
- Country: France
- Current region: Île-de-France and Brittany
- Origin: Brittany
- Current head: Vincent Bolloré
- Connected families: Goldschmidt
- Properties: Manoir d'Odet; Maison de Beg-Meil; A house within the Villa Montmorency; Île du Loc'h

The Bolloré family is a prominent French family from Brittany, originally active in industry, logistics and later in media and telecommunications.

The family became most notable through Vincent Bolloré who was prominently associated with the family-controlled conglomerate Bolloré, also called Papeterie de l'Odet, and later the French conglomerate Vivendi.

The Bolloré family belongs to the Breton bourgeoisie, but was originally a family of fishermen. Since 1861, members of the family have included company directors, a general councillor of the Finistère department, a member of the Kieffer commandos and a member of the French Resistance during the World War II.

Today, the family controls about 31% stake in Universal Music Group (18.51% directly and 13.43% through Vivendi), the 3rd-largest publishing conglomerate Hachette through Louis Hachette Group and its "Big Five" US-subsidiary Hachette Book Group, the multinational advertising company Havas and numerous French media, including the multinational media conglomerate Canal+ and France's 1st conservative 24-hour news channel CNews.

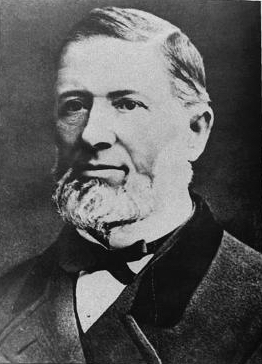
Jean-René Bolloré (1818–1881).

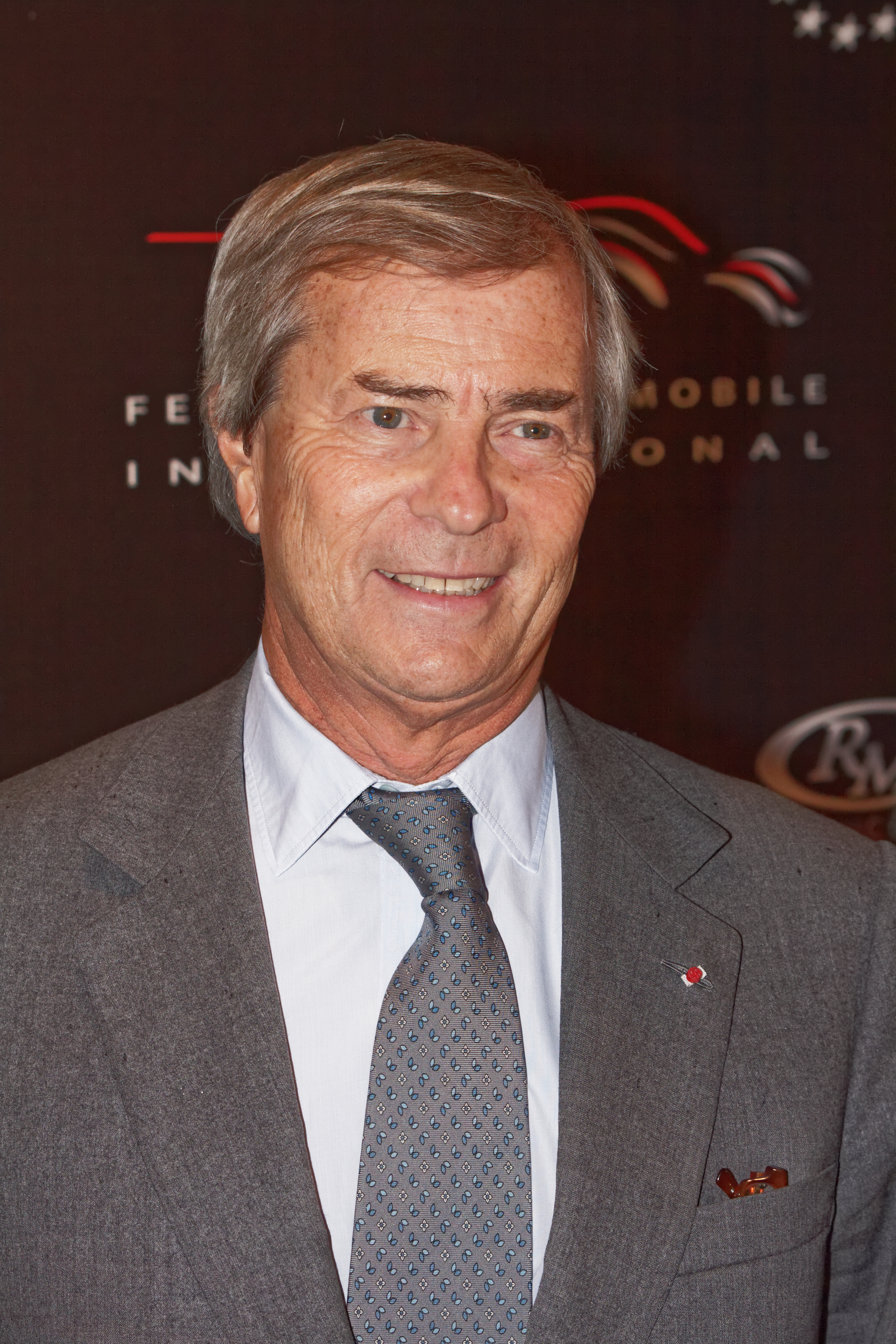
Vincent Bolloré (born in 1952).

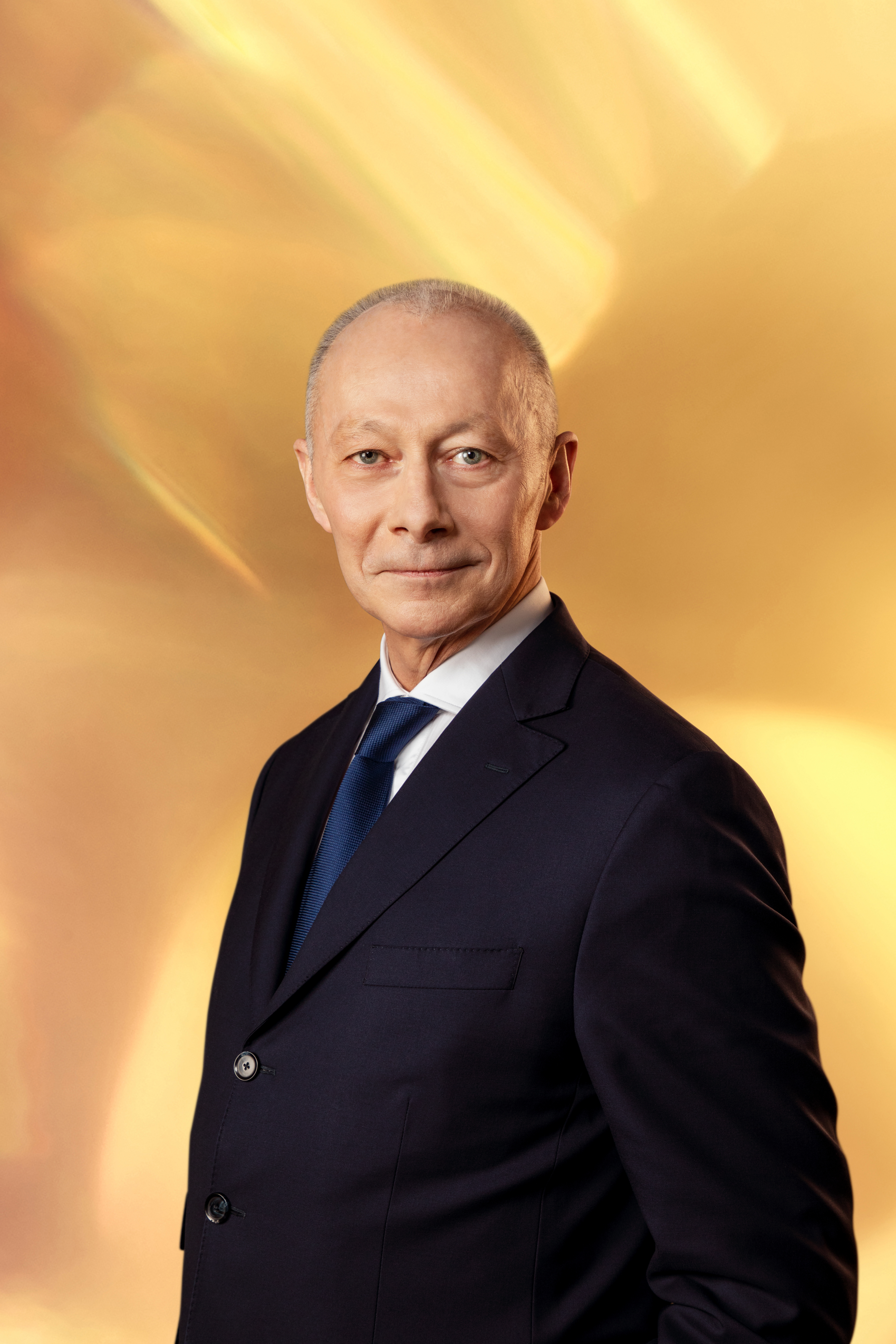
Thierry Bolloré (born in 1963).

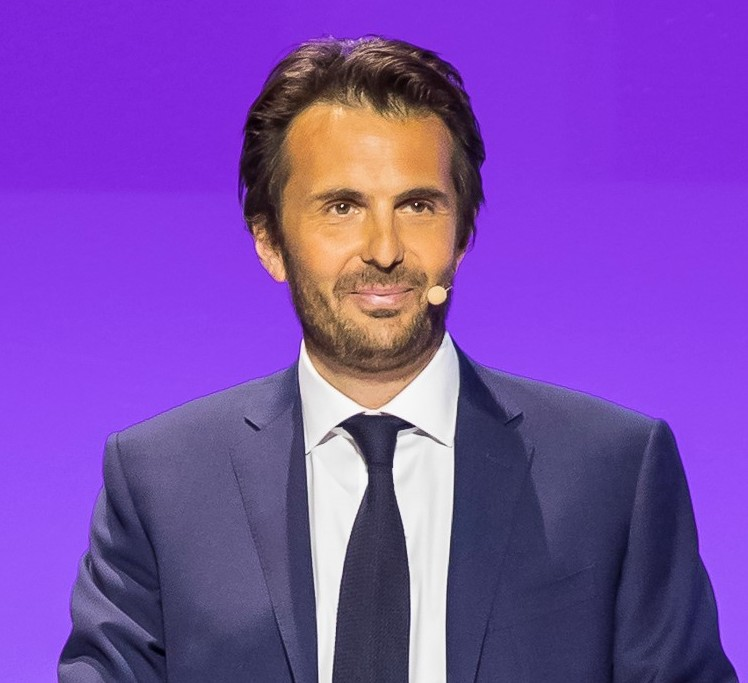
Yannick Bolloré (born in 1980).

== History ==
The family were originally fishermen from Concarneau in Brittany. Their genealogy began in the first decades of the 19th century. The Bolloré family were sailors, then industrialists of the Catholic faith.

The family is made up of two branches:

- The elder branch is represented by Thierry Bolloré, acting CEO of the French multinational automobile manufacturer Renault from 2018 to 2019, and, since 2020, CEO of the British multinational automotive company Jaguar Land Rover, a subsidiary of the Indian automotive group Tata Motors.
- The younger branch descends from Jean-René Bolloré (1818–1881), who was orphaned at the age of twenty. He travelled to the Mediterranean, Brazil and then China, writing a logbook entitled ‘Voyage en Chine et autres lieux’. In 1850, he passed his doctorate in medicine in Paris and graduated from the Naval Medical School in Brest. He married his cousin Élisabeth Bolloré. Following the stroke of his uncle, Nicolas Le Marié (1797–1870), caused by a fall in 1861, he became manager of the latter's paper mill, which he named Bolloré and ran until his death in 1881. He invented OCB thin cigarette paper. He was a general councillor for Finistère from 1871 to 1877.

In 1910 René Bolloré built the Manoir d'Odet in Ergué-Gabéric, to the east of Quimper.

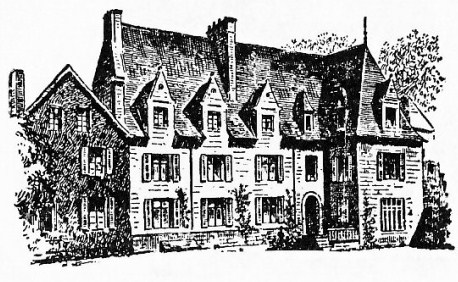
The Manoir d'Odet.

Gwenn-Aël Bolloré and his first cousin, Marc Thubé, were part of the Commando Kieffer, the only French battalion (177 men) in the Normandy landings. Another family member is a member of the Normandy-Niemen fighter regiment.

Vincent Bolloré, born in 1952, is the current head of the younger branch. His father, Michel Bolloré, was a member of the French Resistance during the World War II, and his maternal grandmother, Nicole Goldschmidt, joined Charles de Gaulle in London and the Resistance in the Free France secret service. After the war, under cover of the Red Cross, she pursued a long career as a secret agent in the action department of the SDECE, dealing in particular with her Israeli counterparts. Vincent Bolloré is France's 14th richest person in 2021. In 2014, he took control of the publishing and media conglomerate Vivendi.

In 2022, the Bolloré group, headed by Cyrille Bolloré, son of Vincent Bolloré, took control of the Lagardère Group, still in the publishing and media sector.

== Bibliography ==
- Pinçon, Michel; Pinçon-Charlot, Monique (1999). Nouveaux patrons, nouvelles dynasties (in French). Paris: Calmann-Lévy. p. 278. ISBN 978-2702130391.
- Voyages en Chine et autres lieux, 23 janvier 1839 – 13 mai 1846, Quimper, SFHA, 1979 (préface de Gwenn-Aël Bolloré)

== See also ==
- Bolloré
- Odet
- Ergué-Gabéric (Finistère)
