= SDV =

SDV may stand for:

- Swimmer delivery vehicle for scuba divers
  - SEAL Delivery Vehicle
- Shut down valve
- Switched digital video via cable
- Sde Dov Airport, Tel Aviv, Israel (by IATA airport code)
- Society of Divine Vocations or Vocationist Fathers
- SDV International Logistics
- Source Data Verification, for clinical trials
- Software Defined Vehicle
- Stardew Valley
