= CFAO Group =

French-headquartered pan-African trading and distribution group

- Native name: Corporation For Africa & Overseas
- Formerly: Compagnie Française de l'Afrique Occidentale
- Type: Subsidiary
- ISIN: FR0000060501
- Industry: List: Automotive distribution; Pharmaceutical distribution and retail; Renewable energy; Fast-moving consumer goods
- Founded: 1852; 174 years ago in Marseille, France
- Founder: Charles-Auguste Verminck and Frédéric Bohn
- Headquarters: Paris, France
- Area served: Africa, Asia, Europe, South America
- Key people: Richard Bielle (chairman and CEO)
- Revenue: €9.1 billion (2025)
- Number of employees: 22,990 (2025)
- Parent: Toyota Tsusho
- Divisions: Mobility, Green Infra, Healthcare, Consumer
- Website: www.cfaogroup.com

CFAO Group, short for Corporation For Africa & Overseas, is a French-headquartered company that imports, manufactures, distributes and retails goods and services in Africa and in French overseas territories. Its operations are grouped into four areas: mobility (mainly motor vehicles), Green Infra (renewable energy and infrastructure), healthcare (pharmaceutical manufacturing, wholesale and retail) and consumer goods. It has been a wholly owned subsidiary of the Japanese trading company Toyota Tsusho since 2016.

The group traces its origins to a Marseille trading house founded by Charles-Auguste Verminck in 1852 and has used the name CFAO (originally the Compagnie française de l'Afrique occidentale) since 1887. According to the company, it operates in 40 African countries and six French overseas territories, with 145 operating subsidiaries.

== History ==
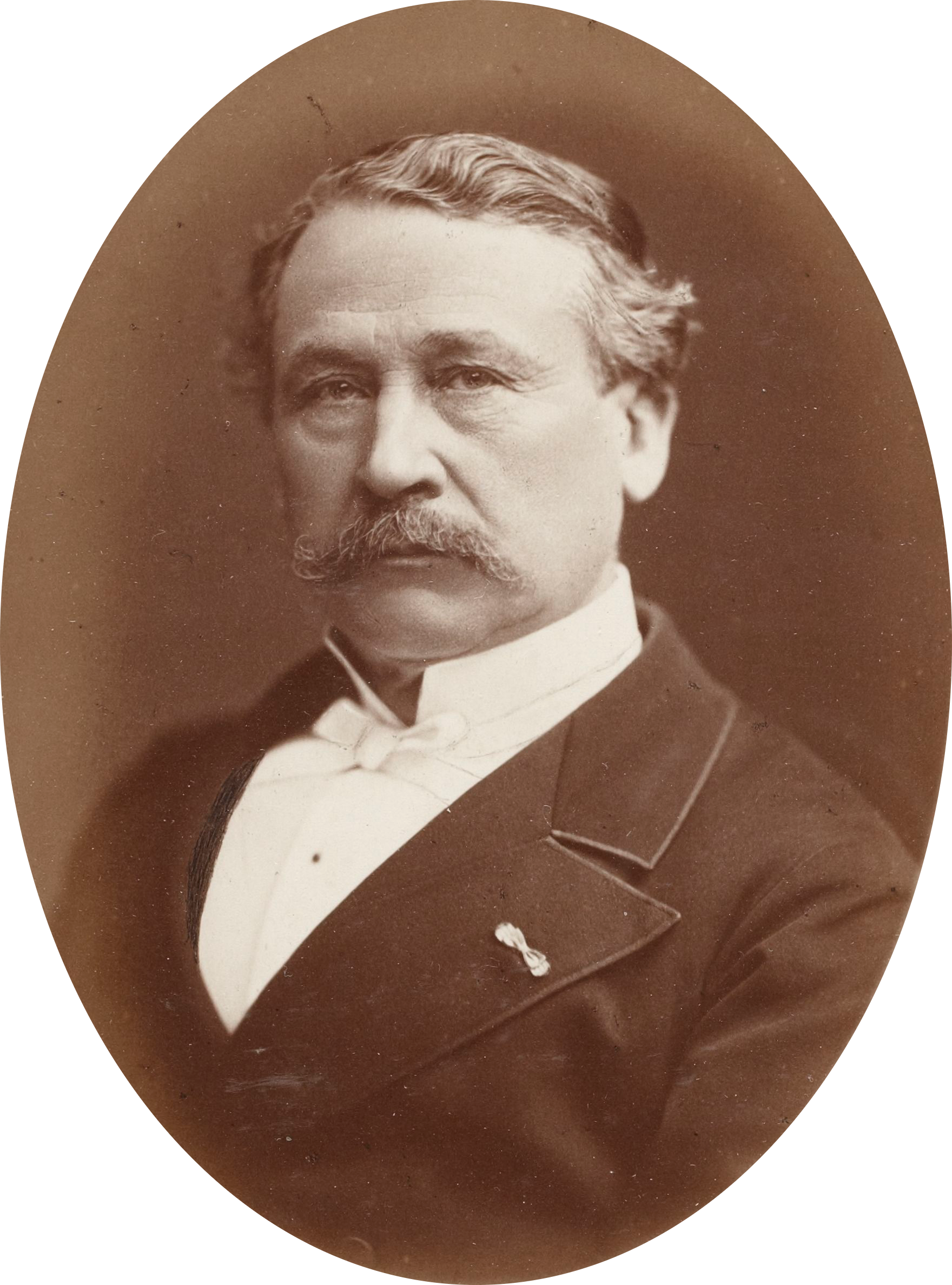
CFAO Founder, Charles-Auguste Verminck

CFAO was founded in 1852 to trade in West African commodities such as groundnuts, cocoa, rubber and soap, with posts in what are now Senegal, Sierra Leone and Ivory Coast. Between 1887 and 1912 its turnover grew and the number of trading posts grew from 46 to 151, extending beyond Senegal, Gambia, Guinea and Sierra Leone into Sudan, Ivory Coast, the Gold Coast, Dahomey and Nigeria.

The business ventured into the motor vehicles market in 1913 when it started selling the Ford Model T in Senegal. Its motor business grew in the 1960s through relationships with Japanese manufacturers, among them Toyota, Isuzu and Subaru;. During this period it also moved into manufacturing, including plastics factories producing Bic pens and razors for West Africa and into local brewing and it expanded its vehicle distribution in East Africa and the French overseas territories.

In 1990 the Pinault group acquired CFAO. In 1996 CFAO bought its long-standing competitor SCOA, which brought in the pharmaceutical distributor Eurapharma, a leading wholesaler in West Africa. A technology division, CFAO Technologies, was created in 2002. CFAO was listed on Euronext Paris in December 2009.

In 2012 Toyota Tsusho made a public tender offer for CFAO as Pinault's successor company (Kering) was withdrawing from retail and distribution and ended up with around 97–98% of the capital. CFAO was delisted from the Paris exchange in 2016, and in March 2017 it became the vehicle for Toyota Tsusho's African operations, which added Toyota Tsusho's businesses in East and Southern Africa to the group.

Notable developments since 2015 include:

- 2015: A retail joint venture with Carrefour was announced and the first PlaYce shopping centre opened in Abidjan in December of that year.
- 2017: CFAO acquired a 51% stake in the Moroccan drug maker Maphar.
- 2019: It bought a 74.9% stake in Unitrans Motors, the motor-retail arm of Steinhoff, giving it a network of dealerships in South Africa.
- 2022: CFAO Healthcare took a minority stake of about 30% in the Kenyan pharmacy chain Goodlife Pharmacy. The PlaYce shopping centre in Yaoundé, Cameroon, also opened that year.
- 2024: CFAO and Eurus Energy formed Aeolus, a joint venture to invest in renewable energy in Africa. In October CFAO Healthcare agreed to acquire Sanofi's consumer healthcare business in South Africa.
- 2025: In July, CFAO Healthcare announced it had acquired 100% of Goodlife Pharmacy from the impact investor LeapFrog Investments; the chain then had nearly 150 outlets in Kenya and Uganda. In December, CFAO Mobility took over the distribution of Toyota and Hino vehicles in Ghana.
- 2026: CFAO Healthcare announced further acquisitions in Southern Africa and the Indian Ocean, including Medswana in Botswana (July) and OPHAM in Madagascar (September).

== Operations ==
CFAO describes its business as covering the value chain from importing and local manufacturing to wholesale and retail distribution. It organises its activities into four areas:

- Mobility – distribution, sales, financing and servicing of motor vehicles and equipment, including Toyota vehicles in a number of markets; CFAO Mobility Kenya, for example, distributes brands such as Toyota, Suzuki, Mercedes-Benz and Hino.
- Green Infra – renewable electricity generation in Africa, including through Aeolus.
- Healthcare – pharmaceutical manufacturing, wholesale distribution and since 2022, retail pharmacies.
- Consumer – food retail and distribution, including supermarkets operated with Carrefour and shopping centres in West and Central Africa.

In 2025 the group reported revenue of €9.1 billion, 22,990 employees and a presence in 40 of Africa's 54 countries, with about 91% of its sales made in Africa. The company's 2025 profile gave 2024 revenue as €8.4 billion.

== See also ==
- CFAO Ghana
- Toyota Group
- Toyota Tsusho
