= Bolloré Logistics =

French transport and logistics company

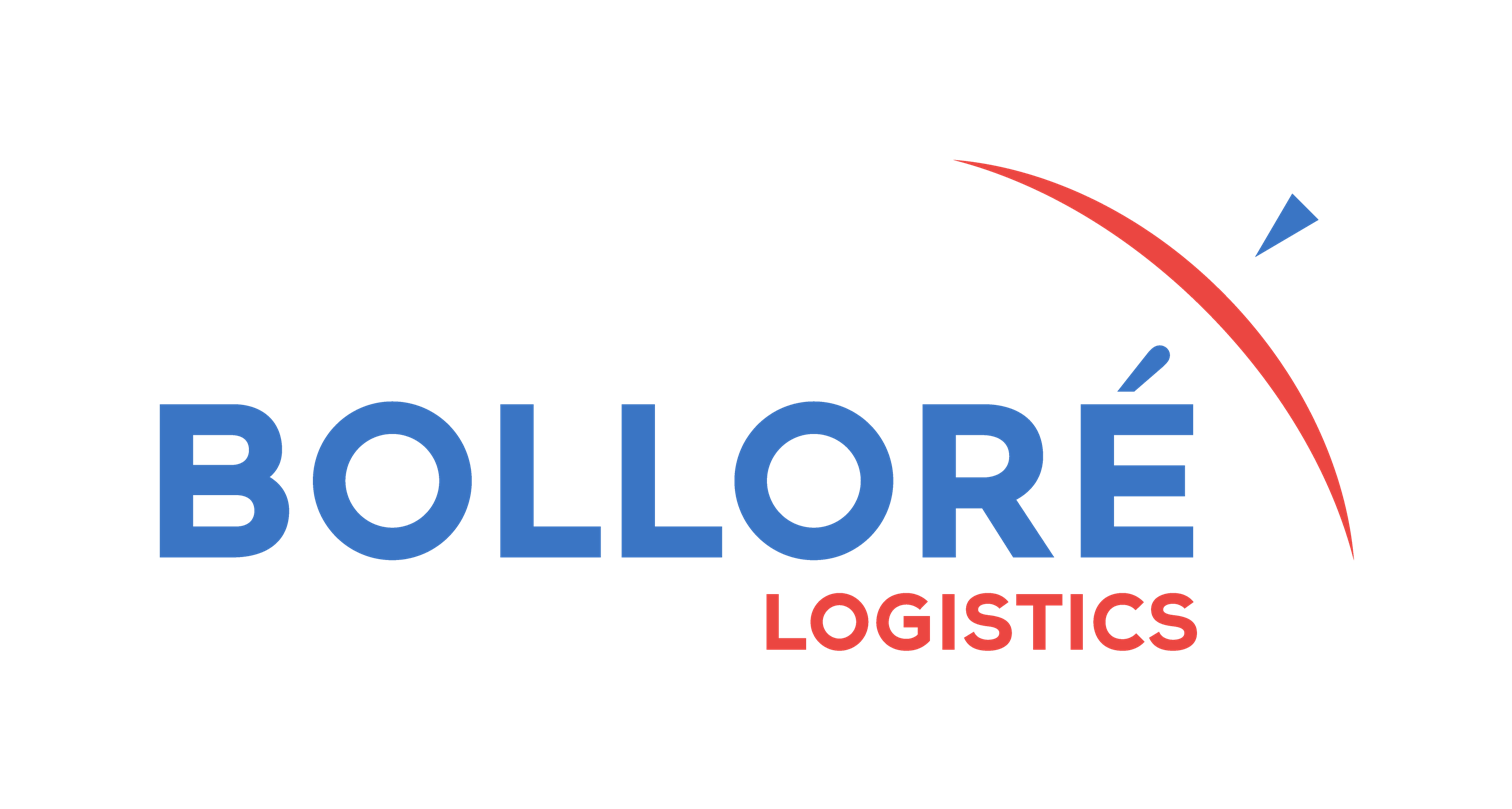
- Formerly: SDV
- Company type: Private Company
- Industry: Transport & Logistics
- Founded: 1986; 40 years ago
- Headquarters: Puteaux, France
- Area served: Worldwide
- Key people: Mathieu Friedberg (CEO)
- Services: Multimodal transport, trade compliance, contract logistics, global supply chain, industrial projects, e-commerce, and customer value
- Owner: Bolloré Transport & Logistics (1986–2024)
- Number of employees: 15,000 (2022) - 110,000 (2024)
- Parent: Bolloré Group (1986–2024); CMA CGM (2024–present)
- Website: cevalogistics.com

Bolloré Logistics is a transport and logistics company of CMA CGM. It offers five types of services, including multimodal transport, customs and regulatory compliance, logistics, global supply chain, and industrial projects.

Based in Puteaux, on the western outskirts of Paris, France, it runs a network of 358 offices and employs 15,000 staff across 146 countries, including 83 partners worldwide . Until 2024, it was a business unit of Bolloré Group.

In February 2024, it was reported that CMA CGM had completed the acquisition of Bolloré Logistics for approximately €4.85 billion.

After being acquired by CMA CGM Group, Bolloré Logistics began rebranding under the CEVA Logistics brand, one of the group's companies.

== History ==
Since 1986, Bolloré Logistics was formerly established in France as a freight forwarder specialized in trade lanes from France to Africa. Until 2024, it was a business unit of Bolloré Transport & Logistics, a fully owned subsidiary of the Bolloré Group.

In March 2016, Bolloré Logistics and the Japanese trading, logistics, and distribution firm Toyota Tsusho announced they had reached a broad cooperation agreement both in Africa and globally. Three years later, Cyrille Bolloré was appointed CEO of the Bolloré Group to succeed his father Vincent Bolloré.

In December 2022, it was announced the Bolloré Logistics subsidiary, Bolloré Africa Logistics Group, had been acquired by the Geneva-headquartered international shipping line, MSC Group.

On May 8, 2023, Bolloré Group received an option from CMA CGM Group to acquire 100% of Bolloré Logistics for an enterprise value of €5 billion; this action is the result of special negotiations announced on 18 April 2023 between Bolloré Group and CMA CGM Group. The acquisition was carried out in February 2024.

After being acquired by CMA CGM Group, Bolloré Logistics began rebranding under the CEVA Logistics brand, one of the group's companies. This transition will consolidate the operations of Bolloré Logistics and CEVA Logistics under a single brand, continuing to offer a range of logistics services, including air and ocean freight, ground and rail transport, and customs solutions.

== Services ==
The company offers seven types of core categories including: multimodal transport, trade compliance, contract logistics, global supply chain, industrial projects, e-commerce, and customer value.

Fields of logistics services cover multiple cargo 'verticals', including aerospace, aid & relief, automotive, consumer and retail, energy, fashion, food and beverage, fragrances and flavors, healthcare, manufacturing and engineering, and perfumes and cosmetics.

In July, 2020, Bolloré Logistics extended its special weekly cargo freight service between Europe and West Africa, the WARA Air Service, until 31 July.

== A wide network ==
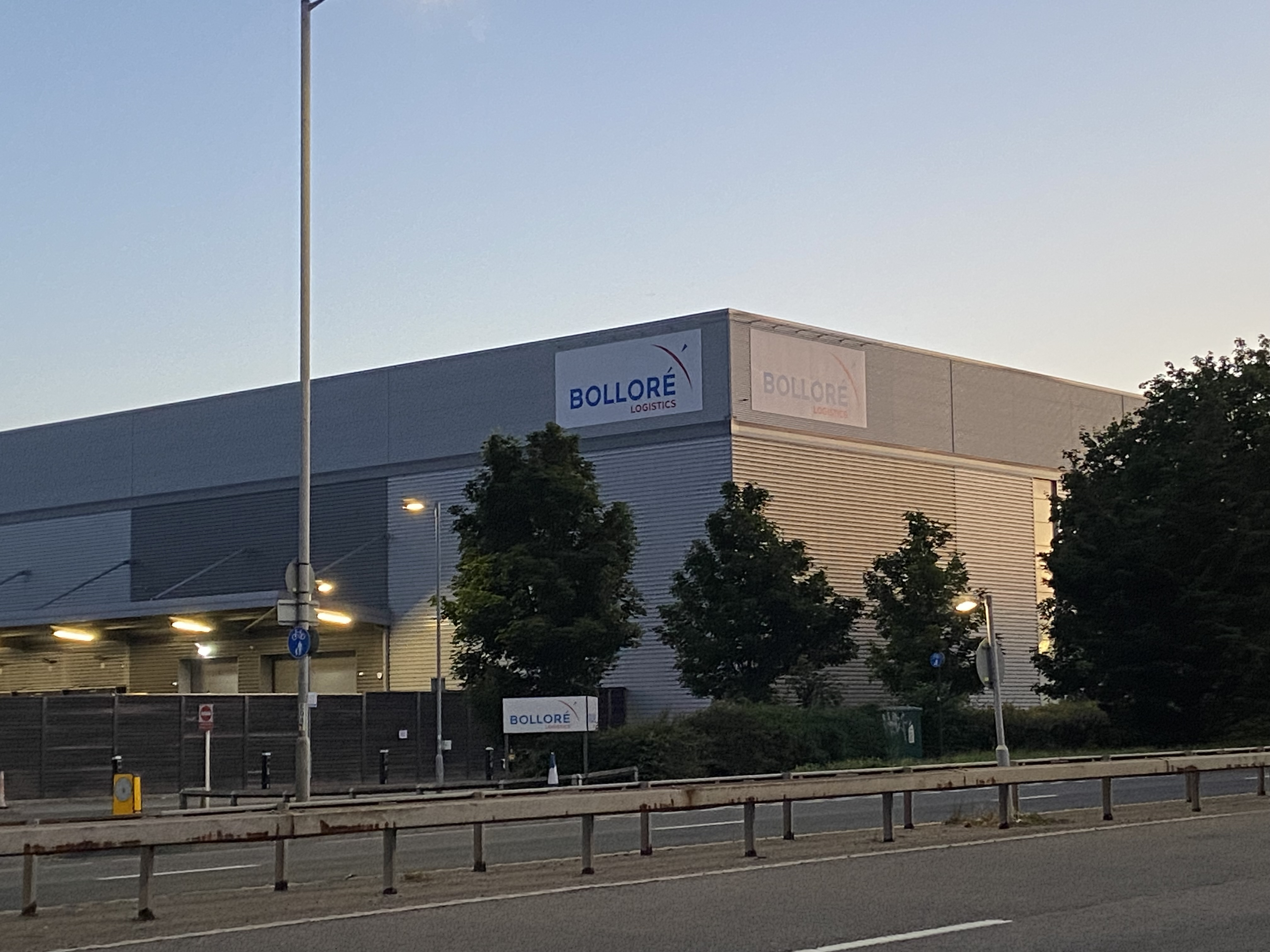
Bolloré Logistics depot near London Heathrow Airport in 2024

=== Africa ===
- 7,111 staff and 244 sites in 48 countries. (Now operating as AGL "Africa Global Logistics" and Owned by msc

AGL are a strategic partner of Bolloré Transport and Logistics

=== Americas ===
- 1,546 staff and 48 sites in 8 countries.
- In 2017, a new site of 20,000 sqm was opened in Miami, USA, to respond to the needs of the Duty Free and Travel Retail industry.

=== Asia-Pacific ===
- 5,353 staff and 84 sites in 18 countries.
- In 2019, Blue Hub was inaugurated in Singapore: a 50,000 sqm facility.

=== Europe ===
- 7,162 staff and 193 sites in 27 countries.
- In 2021, Bolloré Logistics broadened its presence by acquiring Swedish company Global Freight Solutions (G-Solutions) and its Finnish affiliate.
- In February 2021, Bolloré Logistics acquired a majority stake in French digital freight forwarder OVRSEA to broaden its services and offer a 100% digital experience.

=== Middle East - South Asia ===
- 857 staff and 33 sites in 9 countries.
- In 2015, Bolloré Logistics opened a consolidation warehouse in Jebel Ali Free zone.

== Sustainability ==
Bolloré Logistics has since 2018 implemented a Corporate Social Responsibility program called “Powering Sustainable Logistics”. The program aims at boosting the resolution of ethical, social and environmental issues. It involves all the employees and targets in particular eight of the United Nations’ Sustainable Development Goals. The company announced it will reduce its Scope 3 CO_{2} emissions by 30% by 2030 (relative to 2019) to strengthen its commitment in the fight against climate change.

On 27 April 2021, Bolloré Logistics was awarded the Platinum medal by EcoVadis, recognizing the company's structured and proactive efforts in terms of sustainable development.

Air France KLM Martinair Cargo (AFKLMP) and Bolloré Logistics joined forces to launch the first low-carbon airfreight route between Paris Charles de Gaulle and New York-JFK airports.

== Innovation ==
In April 2019, Bolloré Logistics officially opened its first innovation center in Paris, B.Lab, a 500 sqm facility designed to complement efforts towards supply chain transformation. Following this initiative, in November 2019, it unveiled its second B.Lab center in Singapore, boasting a 1,000 sqm facility designed to foster innovation projects.

In 2019, they launched a new Internet of Things-powered (IoT) offering that enables customers end-to-end supply chain visibility.
