= Kim Man-Joong =

South Korean businessman

- 김만중
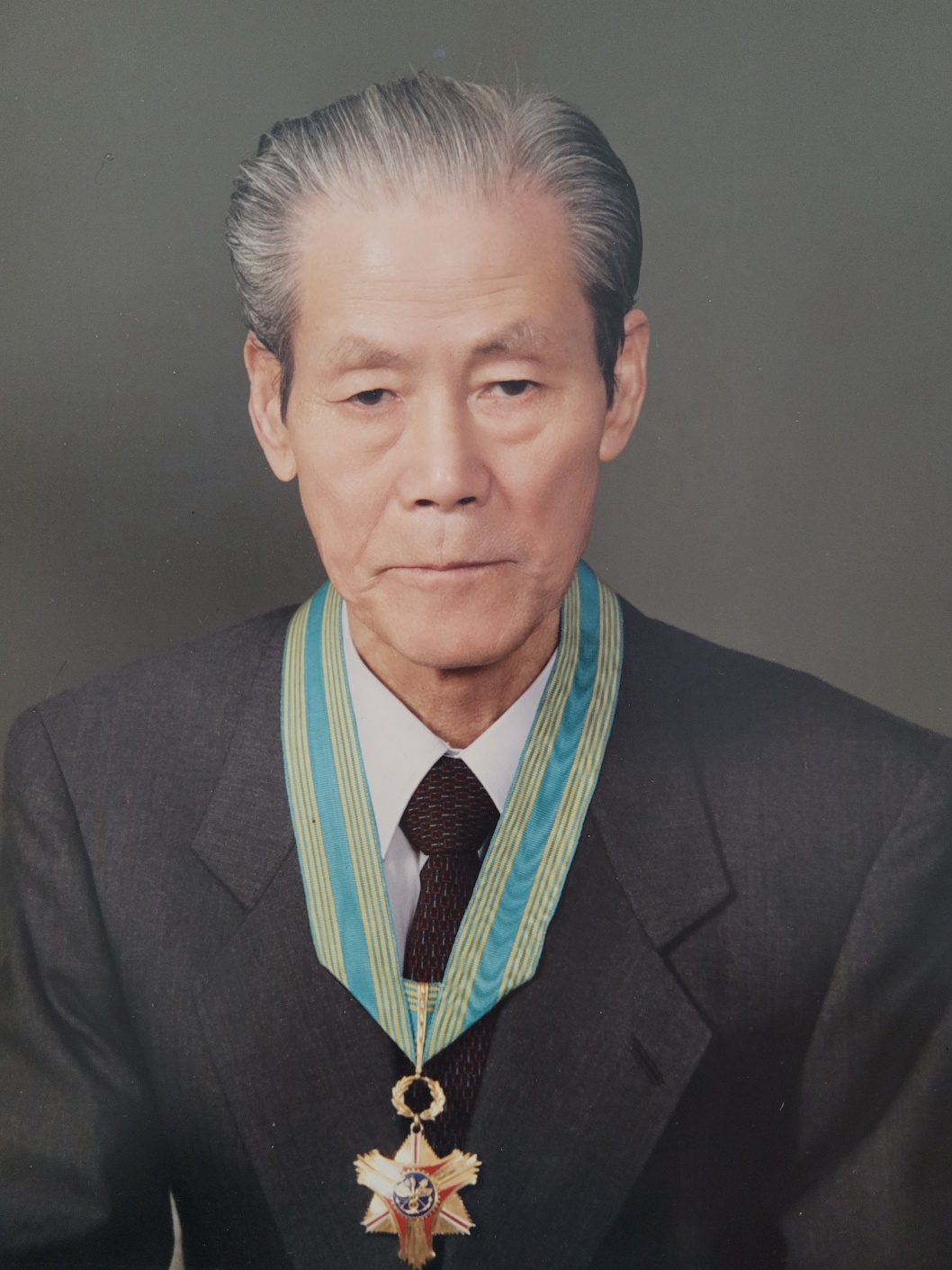
- Born: August 13, 1918; Eonyang-myeon, Ulju County, South Gyeongsang Province
- Died: July 5, 1997 (aged 78); Seoul, South Korea
- Occupation: Businessman
- Organization: Samdo Group
- Known for: Founder of Samdo

Korean name
- Hangul: 김만중
- Hanja: 金萬重
- RR: Gim Manjung
- MR: Kim Manjung

Kim Man-Joong (Korean: 김만중; Hanja: 金萬重; August 13, 1918 – July 5, 1997), (Note: In the Korean calendar (lunisolar), Kim was born on July 7, 1918.) was a South Korean businessman who founded Samdo Group. Kim played a pioneering role in the textile industry, particularly in garment and zipper manufacturing and exporting. Kim is recognized for his contribution to the industrial development and enhancement of the national prestige of South Korea.

The Samdo Group was the first company in Korea to export manufactured clothing goods. It was a conglomerate with offices and manufacturing facilities in 14 countries and about 9,000 employees, focusing on textile, garment and zipper exports, construction, electronics, chemicals, automobile parts, and hotel management. It ranked as one of the top 50 largest companies in Korea until the late 1990s.

== Early life ==
Kim Man-Joong was born on August 13, 1918, in South Gyeongsang Province as the fourth of five sons and two daughters of his father, Kim Young-Jin, and his mother, Lee Bong-Soon.

The family originates from Wolseong, Gyeongju, and Kim is the 37th generation descendant of Prince Yeongbun—the third son of King Gyeongsun, the last king of the Silla Dynasty.

Until his great-grandfather, the family lived in Gyeongju but moved to Eonyang during Kim's grandfather's time. Kim attended Eonyang Primary School (currently Eonyang Elementary School), and after graduating from Busan 2nd Commercial School (currently Gaeseong High School), he began his career.

== Career ==
=== Early career ===
Kim moved to Osaka, Japan, joined Toyota Tsusho Corporation (previously Tomen) in Japan, and worked in Southeast Asia, including Thailand. Kim was in Bangkok when World War II ended. With safety in mind, he saved all his money in a bank, while others bought gold, silver and precious stones. Ultimately, his money in the bank was not useful immediately during the post-war times and to remind himself of the lesson, Kim continued kept the old bankbook containing 1,700 baht, which was equivalent to the cost of 100 large bags of rice in the 1970s.

After Korea regained her independence, Kim returned to Seoul. Building on his experience in textile industry, he joined Chosun Silk Company and focused solely on textiles. In 1951, he entered the trading business and founded Shinkwang Trading Company.

=== Founding Samdo - first to export clothing in South Korea ===
In April 1960, Kim founded Samdo Trading Corporation with a capital of 5 million won, facilitating the export of manufactured clothing goods for the first time in Korea, in collaboration with the trading company Chunwoosa. The first items exported were $4 pants which Kim and Chunwoosa Chairman ventured into bonded processing.

Kim emphasized the sincerity of ascending gradually and a management style that does not harm other companies:

"It is my belief that everything is done according to one's abilities. This is a principle that can be applied not only to businesses but also to households and individuals. Just because someone else goes to the market, you cannot follow along with an empty bag."

Kim has achieved modesty and expertise-oriented management:

"I try to avoid being greedy and pretending to know. In order to not make the mistake of trapping people, I entrust to the professionals and experts and support them to use their abilities to the fullest."

In addition, Kim had a progressive insight on the female workforce problem, which was visionary:

"In the era of manpower shortage, we have come to the point where new techniques must be devised in terms of manpower and production management. If you go to the US or Europe, you can easily witness senior female workers with more than 10 years of experience working earnestly. In comparison, our women either quit or get married after only working for a year or two. It is a huge waste of manpower. Therefore, we are researching how to efficiently utilize the human resources of experienced people in terms of human resource management."

Samdo's sales grew rapidly to $800,000 in 1963, $2.7 million in 1965, and $35 million in 1973, becoming the nation's topmost sewing exporter and specialized clothing exporter. In September 1974, a zipper factory was established, and in November 1979, the corporation achieved, for the first time, an export value of $100 million for a single item of clothing.

=== Expansion diversification of management and succession ===
At the 20th anniversary of the Samdo Corporation in 1980, Kim was appointed chairman of the board of directors, and he expanded the company by adding Samdo General Development and Samdo Construction in earnest. Construction began in the Middle East and Korea, starting with an office building and various infrastructure development.

The Samdo exported audio products as Samdo Electronics and promoted diversification of management by constructing a factory producing Meriyasu. In 1987, Kim passed on the management rights of the Samdo Group and its subsidiaries to his three sons.

=== Decline ===
The Samdo Group faced difficulties due to the quota system overseas and the foreign exchange crisis. It applied for court receivership in 1995 and as a means to resolve, Samdo submitted a plan to the court including the sale of three of the subsidiaries Donghae Terminal, Poongmu Engineering and Samdo Guam Hotel.

== Award ==
His contribution to the South Korean export industry was recognized by award of the Presidential Commendation six times on the annual Trade Day.

In 1968, his company, Samdo, was awarded the Bronze Tower Order of Industrial Service Merit; in 1976, the Silver Tower Order of Industrial Service Merit; and in 1977, the Gold Tower Order of Industrial Service Merit, the highest honor for an export company. In 1979, Samdo was awarded the "100 Million Dollar Tower" in recognition of its contribution to achieving the first export of 100 million dollars with a single item of textile product. After his passing, in 1998, Samdo received the second Silver Tower Order of Industrial Service Merit.

== Death ==
On July 5, 1996, around 3:30 p.m., he died at the age of 78 at the Seoul National University Hospital, and the funeral was held at Samsung Hospital in Seoul Gangnam-gu Ilwon.

== Personal life ==
Kim was married to Chu Young-Soo (1926-2012). They had 4 children; with three sons, Kim Sang-Heon, Kim Jae-Heon, and Kim Jae-Ha, and one daughter, Kim Eui-Sun.

== Other careers ==
- Korean Apparel Export Association, President
- Korea Bonded Products Export Association, President/Vice President
- Baekyang Foundation, President
