= Bolloré =

French conglomerate

Bolloré S.E.

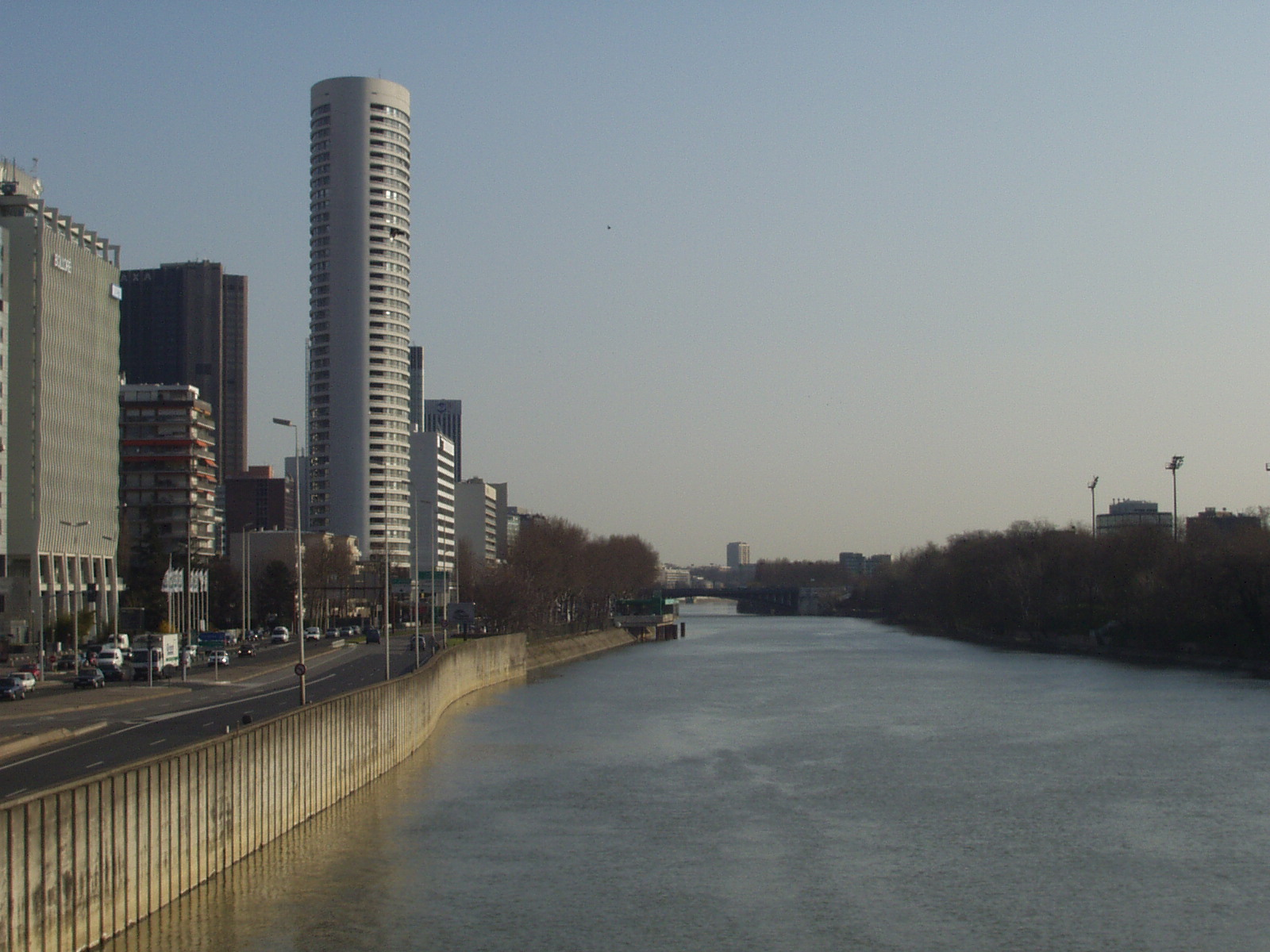
- Type: Societas Europaea
- Traded as: Euronext Paris: BOL; CAC Mid 60 Component
- Industry: Transport
- Founded: 1822; 204 years ago
- Headquarters: Puteaux, France
- Key people: Vincent Bolloré (president and CEO); Yannick Bolloré (vice chairman); Thierry Marraud (CFO)
- Products: Logistics, cargo, paper, automobiles
- Revenue: €24.84 billion (2019)
- Operating income: €1.26 billion (2019)
- Net income: €1.41 billion (2019)
- Owner: Bolloré family
- Number of employees: 79,000 (2021)
- Subsidiaries: Bolloré Energy; Havas; Universal Music Group (28%); Canal+ (31.4%); Louis Hachette Group (31.4%); Vivendi (27.6%)
- Website: www.bollore.com/en

Bolloré S.E. (French pronunciation: [bɔlɔʁe]) is a French conglomerate headquartered in Puteaux, on the western outskirts of Paris, France. Founded in 1822, the company was originally specialized in the fine paper and plastic film industry, its historic business. The group subsequently diversified into international freight transport, oil storage and pipelines in France, solid state batteries, access control systems for buildings, palm oil and rubber in Asia and Africa, olive groves in the US and wine production in France. From the 2000s onwards, advertising, media, and communications were added to the mix. In 2004, the group ranked amongst the top 200 European companies.

In 2009, Bolloré sold its long-standing cigarette paper business. In 2024, the company withdrew from the transport and logistics sectors by selling its subsidiary Bolloré Transport & Logistics to Swiss and French shipping companies MSC and CMA CGM. The group then organized the split of the Vivendi conglomerate, which it controls. Since then, it has directly held 30.4% of each of the new entities created: Canal+ S.A. (audiovisual), listed in London, Louis Hachette Group (press and publishing), Havas (communications) and a much smaller remaining entity retaining the name Vivendi.

The group is also present in the music industry, controlling 18% of Universal Music Group, as well as 10% via Vivendi. The company is listed on the Euronext exchange in Paris, but the Bolloré family retains majority control of the company through a complex and indirect holding structure.

The company is led by Cyrille Bolloré, the son of Vincent Bolloré.

== History ==
The firm was founded in 1822, in Ergué-Gabéric, near Quimper, Brittany by Nicolas Le Marié (1797–1870), as a paper manufacturer named Papeteries d'Odet. Beginning in 1863, it was directed by Jean-René Bolloré (1818–1881), a nephew by marriage who had obtained a medical doctorate in 1863.

The firm remained owned by the Bolloré family. Gwenn-Aël Bolloré was vice-president of the Papeteries Bolloré from 1952 to 1974. In late 2004, the Bolloré group began taking an interest in the advertising sector, and started building a stake in Havas, becoming its single largest shareholder. In a boardroom coup, Alain de Pouzilhac was deposed as president and CEO on July 12, 2005. The Bolloré stake in Havas stood at 26%, and the group had 3 seats on the Havas board as of June 2006. Vincent Bolloré's son, Yannick, became Havas' Chairman and CEO after its previous CEO stepped down in January 2014.

In 2005, Bolloré expanded its media interests by launching the television station Direct 8. The firm also began buying shares of the British media planning and buying group Aegis. Bolloré sold its 26% stake to Dentsu in 2012.

From 6 June 2006 to 22 December 2010, Bolloré launched a free evening newspaper Direct Soir. Lack of readers and advertising revenues made the group focus on its other free newspaper, "Direct Matin", launched in February 2007.

Bolloré manufactures the Bolloré Bluecar, a small electric car, initially produced to showcase the company's range of electric power cells. The Bluecar was introduced in December 2011 as part of the Autolib' carsharing service in Paris. Bluecar deliveries to retail customers began in March 2012.

In 2014, Bollore increased its stake in Havas from 36% to around 83% through a public exchange offer of new Bollore shares for Havas stock. The company said at the time it would like to hold onto a stake well in excess of 50%. In March 2015, Bollore sold a 22.5% stake in the media group for a price of around €600 million.

The next month, in April 2015, Bolloré raised its stake in media company Vivendi from 10.2% to 12.01% at a total cost of €568 million. As of 2016, it owns 20% of Vivendi (30% voting power), 60% of Havas and 9% of Gaumont.

In December 2021, After refusing to comment on market "rumors" announcing its intention to sell its Bolloré Logistics transport and logistics subsidiary in Africa, Bolloré announced it had received an offer from Mediterranean Shipping Company for this subsidiary. In 2022 the sale of Bolloré Africa Logistics was completed.

In September 2024, Bolloré proposed a public buyout of Companie Du Cambodge, Fincière Moncey and Société Industrielle et Fincière de l'Artois in an effort to simplify the groups structure.

== Operations ==
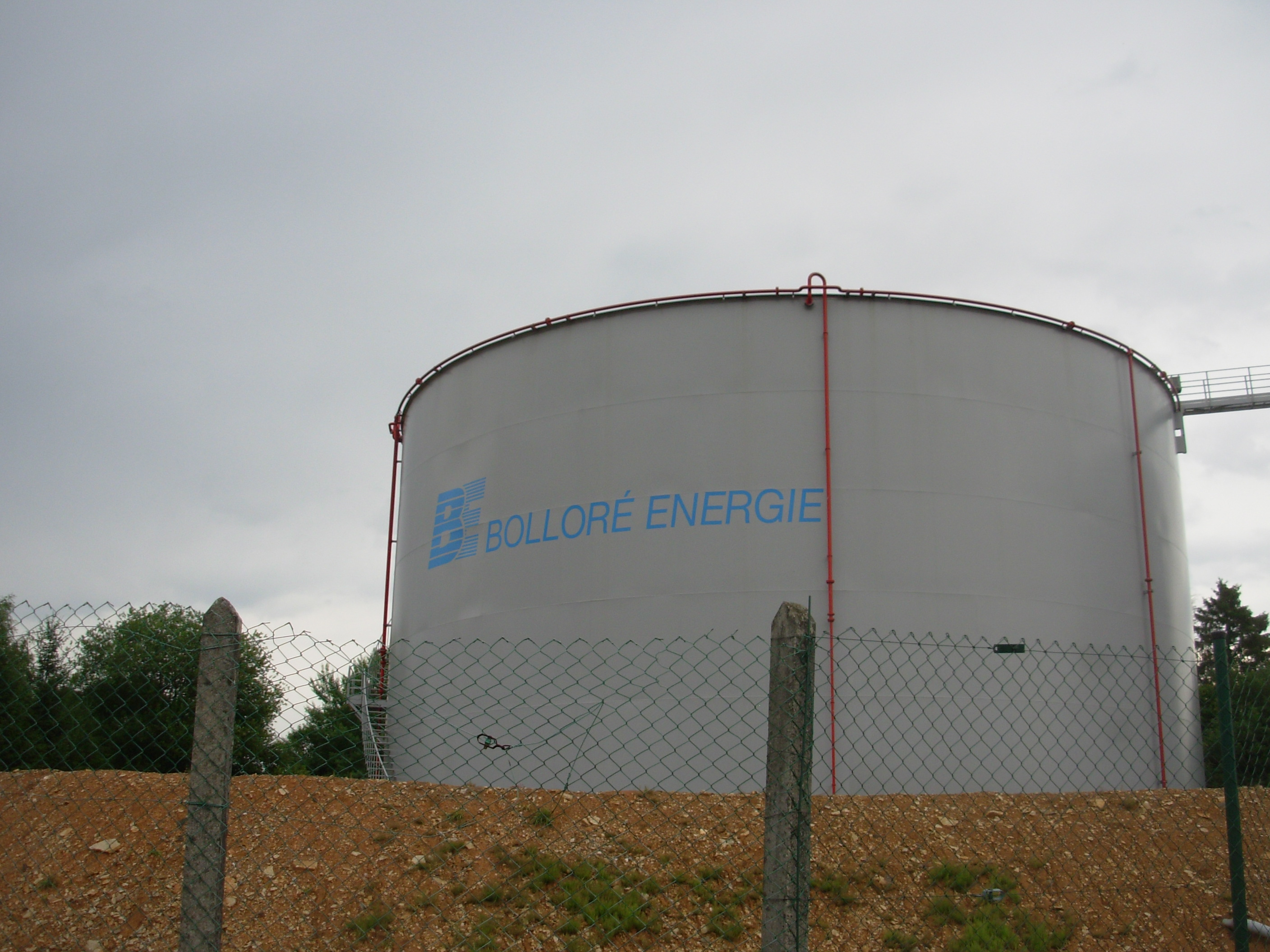
Bolloré Énergie

The Group's principal activities are as follows:

- Plastic Film & Special Papers: polypropylene film for capacitors and packaging, special papers and cigarette paper packs;
- Energy Distribution: distribution of petroleum and coal products;
- Special Terminals: design, production, integration and distribution of intelligent systems and terminals for access control;
- Plantations: rubber and palm oil production in Africa and Asia
- Media & Advertising: owns 60% of the media and communications company Havas, whose CEO—Yannick Bolloré—is also the chairman of Vivendi SA in which Bolloré SA holds a circa 25% stake.
- Telecommunication: owns 90% of Bolloré Telecom, a French WiMAX operator

Bolloré is 63% owned by Financière de l'Odet, the holding company controlled by the Bolloré family. Vincent Bolloré announced that his son, Cyrille Bolloré, would take over the CEO position of Bolloré after the April 15, 2019 shareholders meeting. This was done days before Vincent Bolloré himself "was charged by French police in a bribery case relating to operations in Africa."

== Electric vehicles ==
=== AutoLib ===
There are plans to integrate payment for the bike and car hire schemes with the ticketing systems for traditional modes of public transport. Two electric vehicle manufacturers are said to be in the frame to supply the cars: the Dassault Group and Bolloré. The former has a vehicle called the Cleanova, which employs the body of the Renault Kangoo van, while the Bolloré's Bluecar was developed with Italian styling house Pininfarina and went on sale commercially in 2011.

=== Pininfarina B0 ===
Pininfarina introduced its own electric vehicle concept, the Pininfarina B0 ("B Zero"). The four-seat hatchback features a solid-state lithium-polymer battery, supercapacitors, and a roof- integrated solar panel to achieve a range of 153 miles. Developed in partnership with the Bolloré Group, the vehicle was slated for limited production in 2009. Piniffarina halted contract car making before a finalized revision of the car could make it to market.

=== Bluecar ===
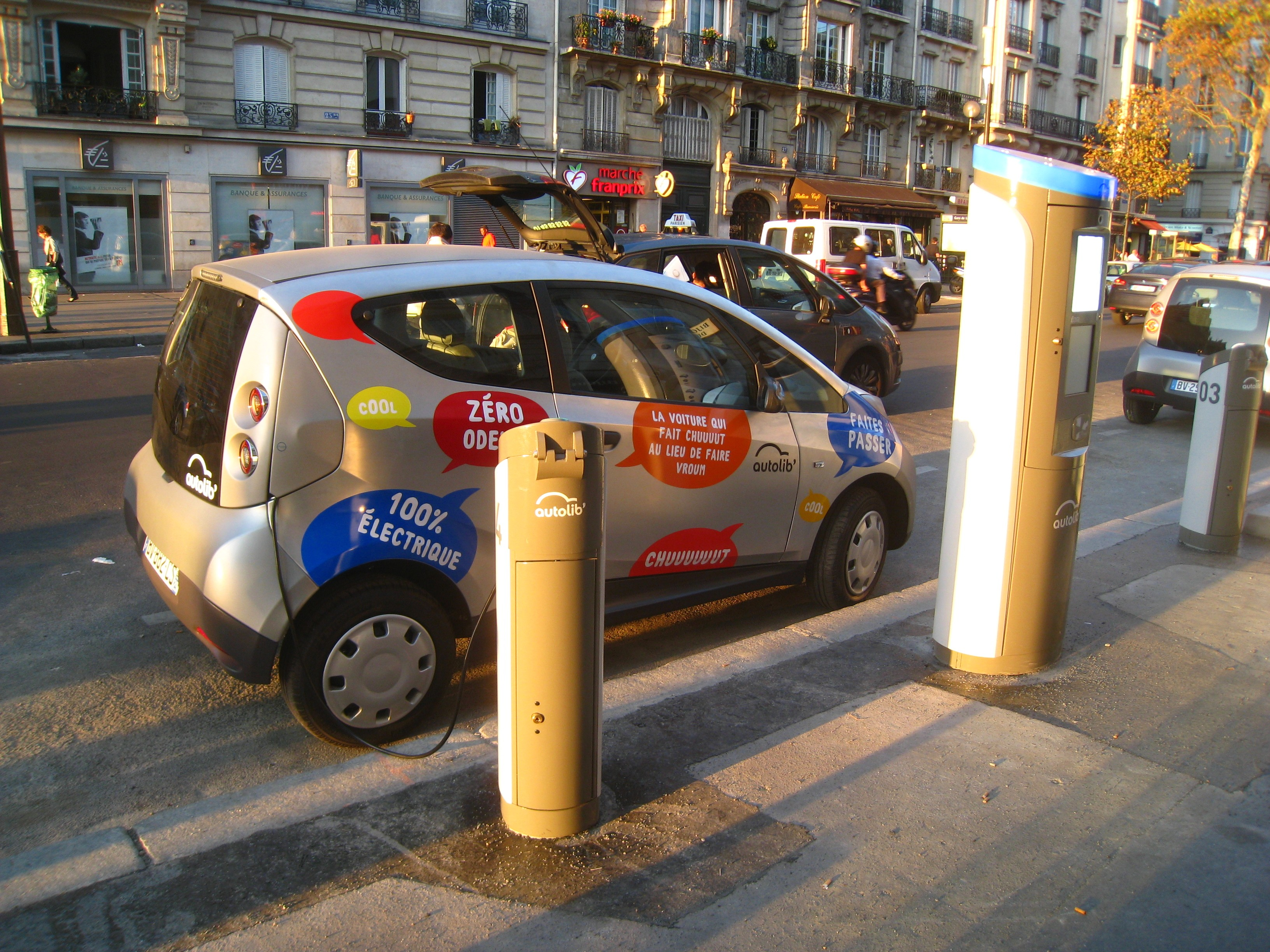
Bolloré Bluecar charging at Autolib' Station on boulevard Diderot, Paris

Bolloré manufactures the Bolloré Bluecar, a small electric car, initially produce to showcase the company's range of electric power cells. The Bluecar was introduced in December 2011, as part of the Autolib' carsharing service in Paris. Bluecar deliveries to retail customers began in March 2012. Bolloré's Bluecar was also used in the Bluecity London car sharing scheme, which existed from 2017 to 2020.

=== Bluebus ===
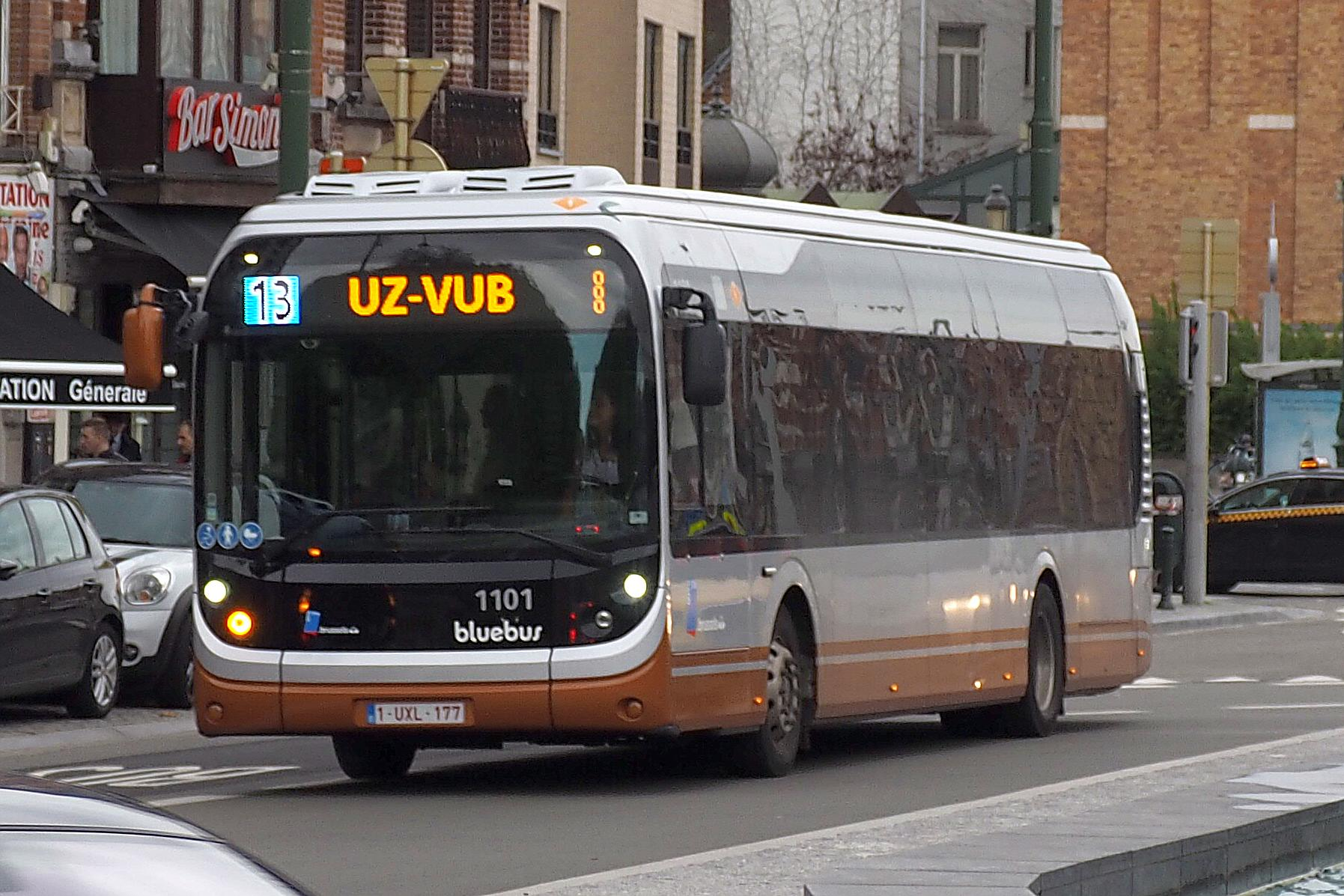
A Bluebus SE in Brussels, Belgium.

Bolloré Bluebus 22 is a 6-metre-long electric microbus with a capacity of 22 passengers. Two copies of this electric vehicle transportation arrived mid-April 2015 to Mulhouse, Haut-Rhin.

Bolloré Bluebus SE is a full-sized (12-metre) low-floor electric citybus that has been produced since 2015. Several Bluebus SE are in commercial use in Paris and in Brussels. In early 2022 RATP, the public traffic provider of Paris, suspended all 149 Bluebus 5SE after a series of busses catching fire.

=== Solar vehicles ===
Hanergy has teamed with Bollore Group to build solar electric vehicles.

== Controversies ==
According to a 2018 New York Times report, the company's air, sea, and land transportation network constitutes a "virtual stranglehold" on West African transport. Bolloré controls 18 ports along the western coast of the continent. In 2022, Bolloré Africa Logistics was sold to the MSC Group.

There are ongoing investigations into the role of drastically discounted Havas communications services accorded to Guinean candidate Alpha Condé and Togolese president Faure Gnassingbé during their presidential campaigns in the awarding of key port concessions in Conakry, Guinea and Lomé, Togo to Bolloré SA. After winning the election, Condé awarded a port-contract to Bolloré, terminating that of the competing Necotrans company. In a settlement, Bolloré paid €2 million to Necotrans without admitting guilt.

In January 2021, Vincent Bolloré and two other Bolloré executives pleaded guilty at a Paris court for supplying €370,000 worth of communication services to Gnassingbé. A 2021 Ghanaian ministerial committee investigation concluded that Bolloré secured an under the table deal with the John Mahama administration for building a new container terminal at Tema with terms strongly favouring the company at the expense of the Ghanaian government.

On March 18, 2025, a complaint was filed against the Bolloré group at the Paris National Financial Prosecutor's Office. This complaint was filed by the Restitution for Africa collective, which is made up of eleven NGOs present in six African countries: Togo, Guinea, Cameroon, Ghana, Ivory Coast, and the DRC, for alleged charges of "concealment" and "money laundering" in the context of its logistics activities in Africa and the management of its ports.
