= Toyota Tsusho =

Japanese company in the Toyota Group

Toyota Tsusho Corporation

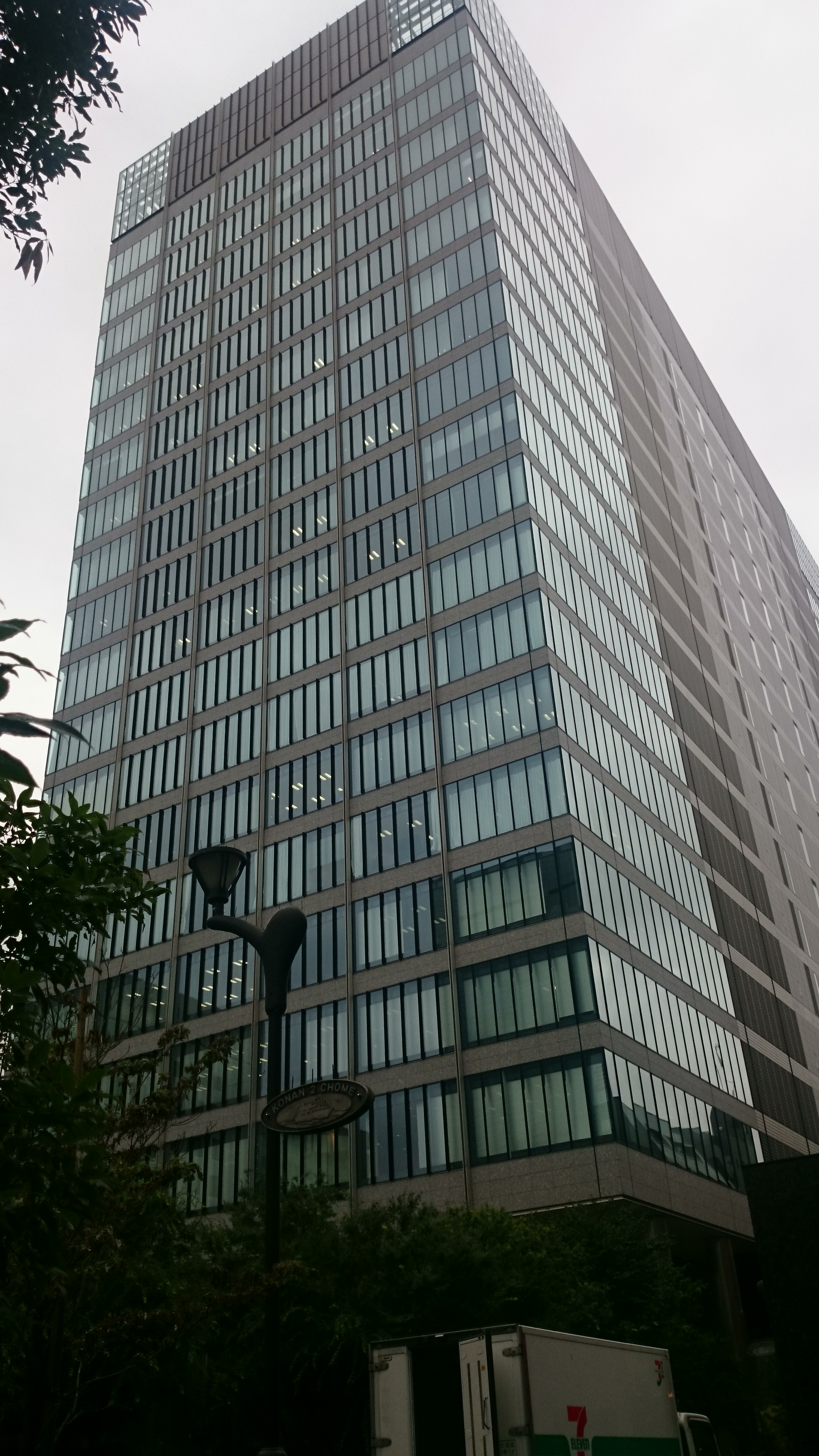
- Tokyo Head Office
- Native name: 豊田通商株式会社
- Romanized name: Toyota Tsūshō Kabushiki-gaisha
- Type: Public (K.K)
- Traded as: TYO: 8015
- Industry: Trading Companies
- Founded: July 1, 1948; 78 years ago
- Headquarters: Nagoya and Tokyo, Japan
- Key people: Ichiro Kashitani, President
- Revenue: US$78.9 billion (2015)
- Operating income: US$1.55 billion (2015)
- Net income: US$616 million (2015)
- Number of employees: 53,241 (2015)
- Parent: Toyota Group
- Website: www.toyota-tsusho.com

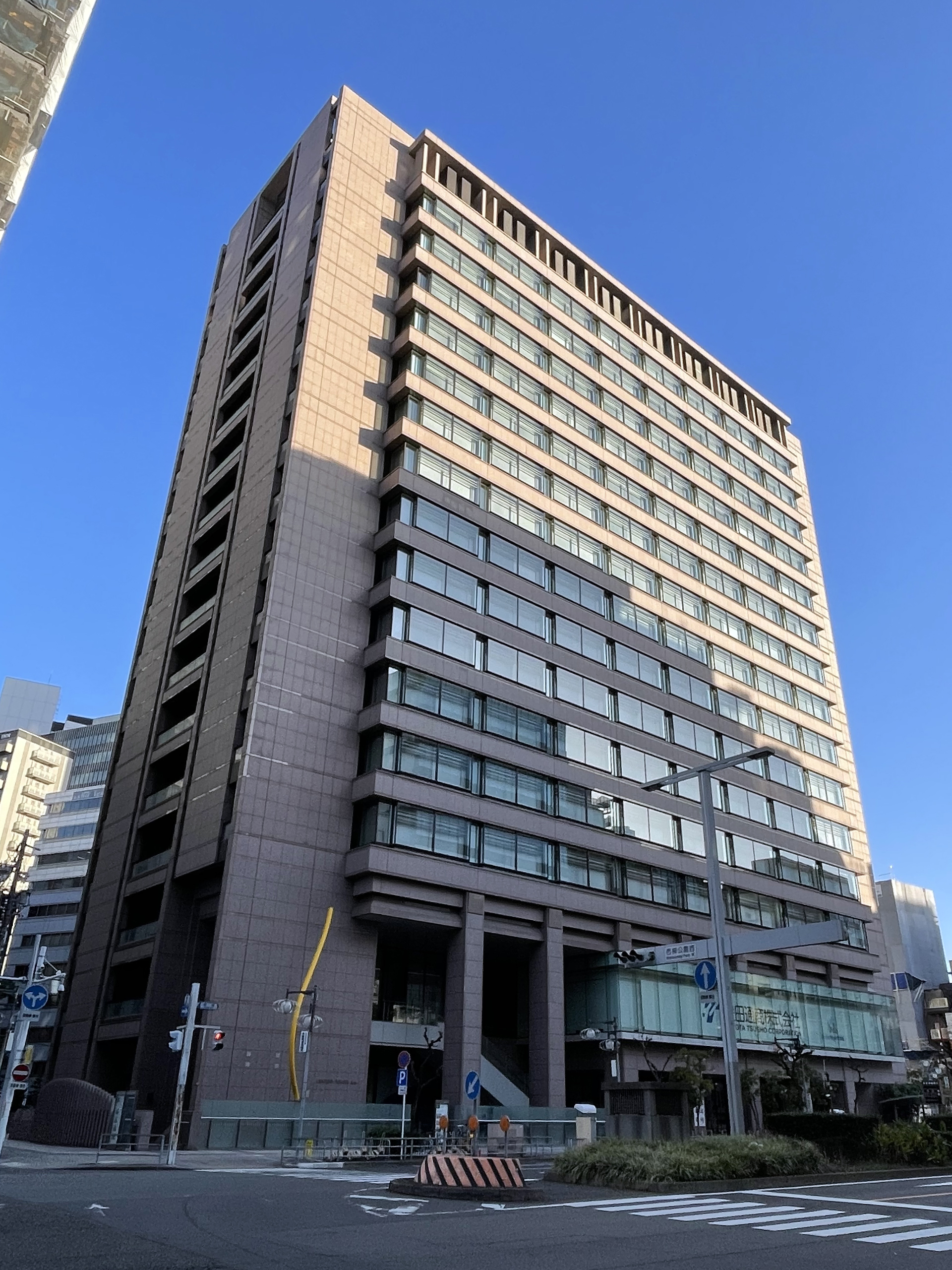
Nagoya Head Office

Toyota Tsusho Corporation (豊田通商株式会社, Toyota Tsūshō Kabushiki-gaisha; TYO: 8015; also Toyota Tsusho) is a sōgō shōsha (trading company) and a member of the Toyota Group based in Nagoya and Tokyo. Toyota Tsusho has a worldwide presence through its many subsidiaries and operating divisions, including over 150 offices and 900 subsidiaries and affiliates around the world. Its main business is supporting Toyota's automobile business and other Toyota Group companies, but Toyota Tsusho's business is very diverse, spanning industrial, commercial, and consumer sectors. Business areas run the gamut, including industrial raw materials, agricultural products, and high technology.

== History ==
Toyota established Toyoda Kinyu Kaisha (トヨタ金融株式會社) in 1936 to provide sales financing for Toyota cars. The dissolution of the Toyota zaibatsu in 1948 led to the trading division of Toyota Finance being spun off to a new company called Nisshin Tsusho Kaisha, Ltd. (日新通商株式会社) This company was renamed "Toyoda Tsusho" in 1956.

Toyota Tsusho began exports of Toyota cars in 1964, starting with exports to the Dominican Republic. By the 1980s it had expanded its business to include overseas production for the Toyota Group, and had established a second head office in Tokyo.

Toyota Tsusho merged with Kasho Company, Ltd. in 2000. Kasho was a trading company focused on the Southeast Asia markets and dealt in rubber, paper, food, chemicals and general merchandise.

Toyota Tsusho then acquired Tomen Corporation, another Japanese trading company, on April 1, 2006. This acquisition expanded Toyota Tsusho's food, textiles, chemicals and energy business and caused it to leapfrog Sojitz to become the sixth-largest general trading company in Japan. Tomen had been founded in 1920 as Toyo Menka Kaisha (東洋棉花株式會社) from the cotton trading business of Mitsui & Co. and was active in grain processing, power generation, agrochemicals and other business areas worldwide. These acquisitions together expanded Toyota Tsusho's business beyond its historical automotive focus.

In March 2016, Toyota Tsusho announced having reached a broad cooperation agreement with Bolloré Logistics, the logistics arm of the Bolloré French conglomerate, to "enhance and secure their foundation as Africa's number one position by the joint business development in various fields including infrastructure and logistics" (quote), both in Africa as well as globally.

In August 2018, Toyota Tsusho began a partnership with Microsoft to create fish farming tools using the Microsoft Azure application suite for IoT technologies related to water management. Developed in part by researchers from Kindai University, the water pump mechanisms use artificial intelligence to count the number of fish on a conveyor belt, analyze the number of fish, and deduce the effectiveness of water flow from the data the fish provide. The specific computer programs used in the process fall under the Azure Machine Learning and the Azure IoT Hub platforms.

On November 14, 2022, OneH2, Inc. have partnership with Toyota Tsusho America, Inc on hydrogen fuel cell technologies.]

In November 2026, Toyota Tsusho group company AEOLUS secured financing for Gulf of Suez Wind Farm III, a planned 900 MW wind farm in Egypt developed jointly with Engie and Orascom Construction. The project was scheduled to begin full commercial operation in September 2028, with electricity sold to the Egyptian Electricity Transmission Company under a 25-year agreement. The financing package totalled approximately US$588 million, including a loan of up to approximately US$285 million from the Japan Bank for International Cooperation.

== Business sections ==
Toyota Tsusho's businesses are divided into 7 business sections:

- Metals: The Metals Division views steel and non-ferrous metals as products with unique properties and functions rather than simple commodities. This approach allows us to provide optimal products and logistics matching the needs of both suppliers and users. The Division is composed of multiple strategic business units (SBUs), all of which manage both steel and non-ferrous products. This ensures that each SBU can respond to customer needs with proposals covering multiple types of metal products.
- Global Parts & Logistics: The Global Parts & Logistics Division's network spans 38 nations, with 177 sites operated by 79 overseas subsidiaries and business entities. It has approximately 14,000 members worldwide.
- Automotive: The Automotive Division exports passenger cars, commercial vehicles, trucks, buses, material handling machineries, motorcycles, and spare parts manufactured primarily by the Toyota Group in Japan to countries around the world, and also exports products manufactured outside Japan to other countries. The Division's global network covers 146 nations, with the Division having its own business management operations in 48 nations. (Including the vehicle business of the Africa Division, this total becomes 175 nations worldwide, with the Division having its own business management operations in 87 nations.)
- Machinery, Energy & Project: The Machinery, Energy & Project Division is engaged in the machinery and equipment business (primarily in the automotive industry), the construction equipment business, the electric power business, the energy business (natural gas, oil, and coal projects), and the plant business.
- Chemicals & Electronics: The Chemicals & Electronics Division takes an integrated approach to its three main businesses: automotive materials, chemicals, and electronics.
- Food & Consumer Services: The Food & Consumer Services Division is contributing to healthier, more prosperous ways of life through initiatives in its four core businesses: grain, food, insurance, and lifestyle.
- Africa: For more than 90 years, Toyota Tsusho has striven to develop markets in Africa from a long-term perspective by growing with communities and their people through trade and investments. In 2012, Toyota Tsusho acquired a capital stake in the largest French trading company, CFAO; in December 2016, Toyota Tsusho made CFAO a wholly owned subsidiary, with the aim of accelerating its business initiatives in Africa. The Africa Division—the company's first division dedicated to a single region—was subsequently established in April 2017.

== Head Offices ==
- Nagoya head office - 9–8, Meieki 4-chome, Nakamura-ku, Nagoya, Japan
- Tokyo head office - 3–13, Konan 2-chome, Minato-ku, Tokyo, Japan

== Major subsidiaries and affiliates ==
- CFAO
- C.I. Toyota Tsusho de Colombia S.A.
- Country Pure Foods
- Elematec Corporation
- Eurus Energy Holdings Corporation
- First Baking Co., Ltd.
- Fukuske Corporation
- Lao-Japan Airport Terminal Services Company Limited
- P.T. Toyota Tsusho Indonesia
- Sanyo Chemical Industries, Ltd.
- SB Energy
- S.C. Toyota Tsusho do Brasil Ltda.
- Tomen Electronics Corporation
- Tomen Devices Corporation
- Toyota Tsusho America, Inc.
- Toyota Tsusho Finance (CAMBODIA) PLC
- Toyota Tsusho Canada, Inc.
- Toyota Tsusho De Venezuela, C.A.
- Toyota Tsusho Argentina S.A.
- Toyota Tsusho Mexico S.A. de C.V.
- Toyota Tsusho Europe S.A.
- Toyota Tsusho U.K. Ltd.
- Toyota Tsusho RUS LLC (TTR), Russia
- Toyota Tsusho Africa Pty. Ltd.
- Toyota Tsusho East Africa Limited
- Tomen Iran Limited Liability Company
- Toyota Tsusho Korea Corporation
- Toyota Tsusho Asia Pacific Pte. Ltd.
- Toyota Tsusho Philippines Corporation
- Toyota Tsusho (China) Co., Ltd.
- Toyota Tsusho (Dalian) Co., Ltd.
- Toyota Tsusho (Tianjin) Co., Ltd.
- Toyota Tsusho (Shanghai) Co., Ltd.
- Toyota Tsusho (Guangzhou) Co., Ltd.
- Toyota Tsusho (H.K.) Corporation Ltd.
- Toyota Tsusho (Taiwan) Co., Ltd.
- Toyota Tsusho (Thailand) Co., Ltd.
- Toyota Tsusho (India) Pvt.Ltd.
- Toyota Tsusho (Malaysia) Sdn. Bhd.
- Toyota Tsusho Vietnam Company Limited
- Toyota Tsusho India Pvt. Ltd.
- Toyota Tsusho (Australasia) Pty. Ltd.
- Toyota Tsusho South Pacific Holdings Pty Ltd
- Toyota Tsusho Electronic (Thailand) Co., Ltd
- Toyota Tsusho Network Integration Thailand Co., Ltd
- Toyota Tsusho Network Integration Asia Pte. Ltd.
- Toyota Tsusho Network Integration India Pvt Ltd.
- Toyota Tsusho Kenya Ltd.
- Toyotsu Machinery Corporation
- Toyotsu Rare Earths India Pvt. Ltd.(INDIA)

== See also ==
- Toyota Group
