= CFAO Ghana =

Ghanaian automobile company

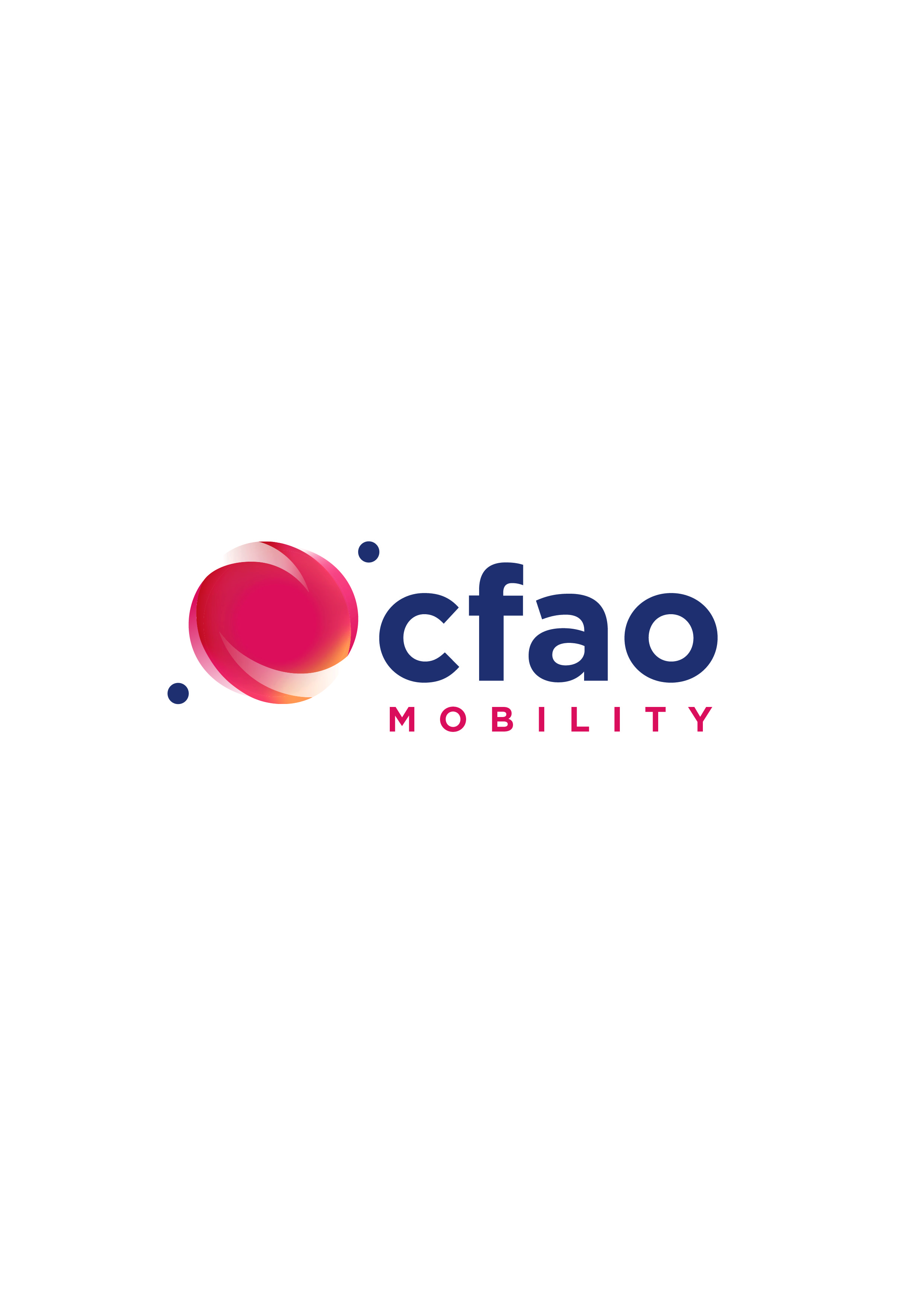
- Type: Public
- Genre: Automotive industry
- Founded: 1909
- Headquarters: Airport bypass Airport Bypass Road BP 70 Accra, Ghana, Accra, Greater Accra, Ghana, Ghana
- Number of locations: Accra, Kumasi, Takoradi, Tema
- Key people: Adedamola Adelabu; Managing Director
- Products: trading – office equipment, automotive, household appliance, industrial
- Services: Servicing – Car Dealership – Equipment
- Website: www.cfaomotors-ghana.com

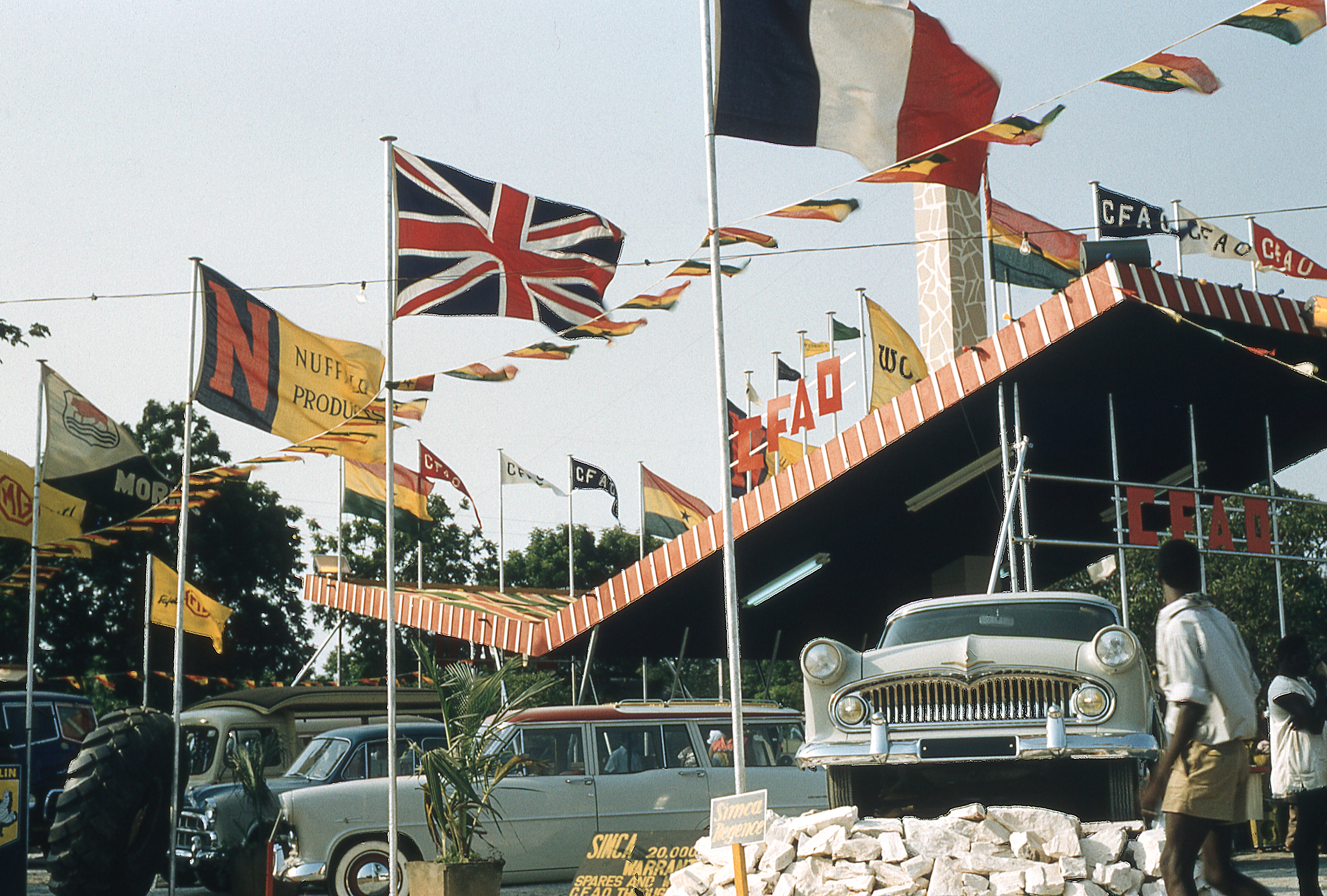

CFAO Ghana, also known as CFAO Motors Ghana, is a Ghanaian automobile company. It was formed in 1909 and is currently headed by Paulo Fernandes.

== Overview ==
CFAO Ghana is a subsidiary of CFAO Automotive, the largest automobile network in Africa and the overseas French territories. It is also the exclusive Ghanaian distributor for seven international brands which are, Mitsubishi Motors, Suzuki, Fuso, DAF Trucks, and Bridgestone.

== Operations ==
CFAO Motors Ghana covers the whole Ghana from its four branches in Accra, Tema, Kumasi and Takoradi. The company comprises over 129 personnel work together in meeting the needs of customers including after – sales service. CFAO works with clients by distributing consumer goods and other equipment. It also deals with motor vehicles. The company is authorized to set up, undertake and operate commercial, technical and industrial enterprises, and any other activities connected therewith. The Company operates in three segments which are Motor, Technologies and Europcar. Motor division is engaged in the sales and services of vehicles and equipment. Technologies division sells and services office equipment and machines. Europcar division is engaged in car rentals and other related activities.

== Executives ==
The following is a list of directors of CFAO Ghana:

- Alhaji Asumah Banda
- E.K. Akyea-Djamson
- Herve Bijonneau
- Jacques Zymelman
