= Ralf Speth =

German automotive executive (born 1955)

Sir Ralf Speth KBE FRS
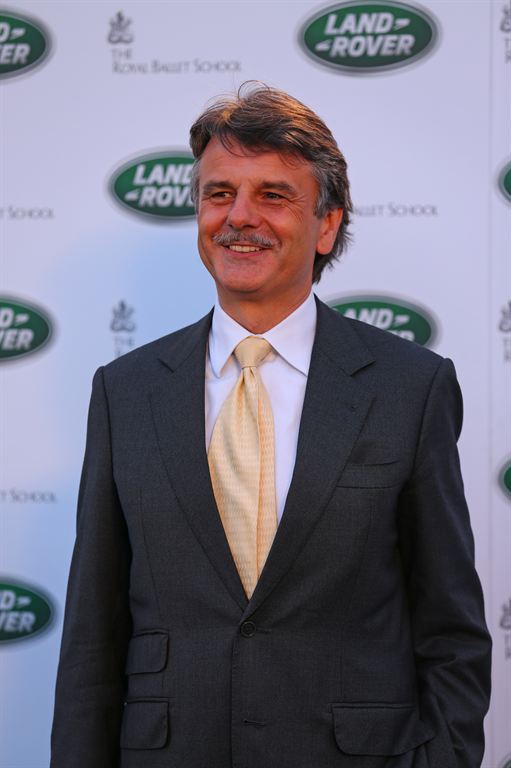
- Speth in 2012
- Born: Ralf Dieter Speth; 9 September 1955 (age 71); Roth, Bavaria, West Germany (Present-day, Roth, Bavaria, Germany)
- Citizenship: Germany; United Kingdom (since 2019)
- Education: Warwick Manufacturing Group
- Occupation: Automotive industry executive
- Known for: Former CEO of Jaguar Land Rover.
- Title: Chairman, TVS Motor Company, Additional director of Tata Sons
- Successor: Thierry Bolloré

Sir Ralf Dieter Speth (born 9 September 1955) is a German automotive executive and a director of Indian company Tata Sons since 2016. From 2010 to 2020, he was the chief executive officer of Jaguar Land Rover. He has also had roles with BMW, Linde and Ford's Premier Automotive Group. Since 2022, Speth is the chairman of Indian automaker TVS Motor Company.

== Education ==
Speth earned a degree in engineering from the Rosenheim University of Applied Sciences, Germany. He later undertook a doctorate of engineering in mechanical engineering and business administration at the University of Warwick.

== Career ==
Speth started his automotive career with BMW in 1980 and worked for them for 20 years.

In 2002, he joined The Linde Group as head of global operations and vice president of operations. He was also chief operating officer and a member of the executive board at its subsidiary KION Group GmbH.

In 2007, Speth returned to the car industry and joined Ford Motor Company's Premier Automotive Group (PAG) as director of production, quality and product planning. Following the sale of two of the PAG marques, Jaguar and Land Rover, to Tata, he became chief executive officer of Jaguar Land Rover (JLR) in February 2010, and a non-executive director of Tata Motors in November 2010.

Under Speth's management, JLR increased the company's workforce significantly. "We have added more than 17,000 people in the course of the last five years," he said in an interview published in June 2015. Speth championed the need for R&D and made much of JLR's investment in R&D. "I guess we are the biggest R&D investor in the UK in the automotive business," he claimed.

In the 2015 Special Honours list, Speth was appointed an honorary Knight Commander of the Order of the British Empire for his services to the automotive industry. In August 2019, the award was made substantive following Speth becoming a British citizen.

In September 2016, Speth was appointed an honorary professor, having previously been an industrial professor.

In October 2016, Speth was appointed an additional director on the board of Tata Sons. On 30 January 2020 he announced his intention to retire from his role as CEO of JLR effective September 2020, but remain on both the JLR and Tata Sons boards. He entered into a non-executive role in the company and was succeeded by the CEO of Renault, Thierry Bolloré.

In 2020, he was elected a Fellow of the Royal Society.

In April 2022, Speth took over the role of chairman of Indian automaker TVS Motor Company, succeeding Venu Srinivasan.

In 2023, Speth was given an honorary doctorate from the University of Warwick.

== Personal life ==
He is married, with two children, and lives between Leamington Spa and Munich.

Business positions
| Preceded by | CEO of Jaguar Land Rover; 2010–2020 | Succeeded by Thierry Bolloré |
