= Samdo =

1960–2002 South Korean conglomerate

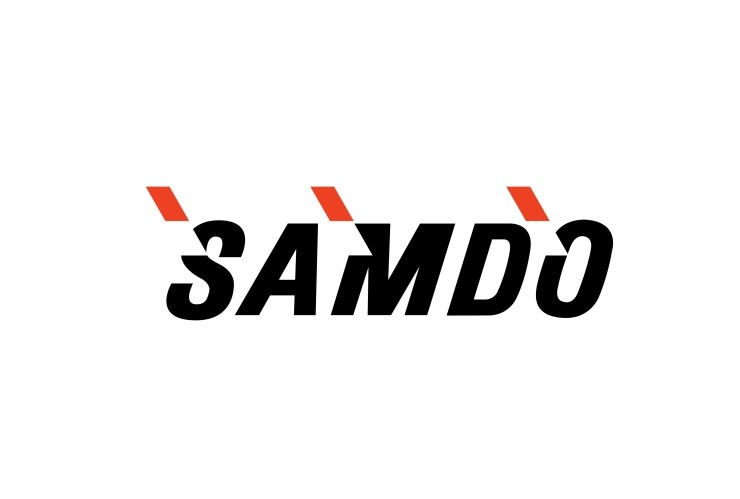
- Native name: 삼도
- Type: Conglomerate (company)
- Industry: Textile, garment and zipper manufacturing, electronic, chemical, automobile parts, construction, etc.
- Founded: 1960
- Founder: Kim Man-Joong
- Defunct: 2002
- Headquarters: Joonggu Sunhwa-dong Samdo building, Seoul, South Korea
- Number of locations: Offices: China (Hong Kong), France (Paris), Germany (Düsseldorf), Japan (Osaka), Netherlands (Amsterdam), Saudi Arabia (Jeddah), United States (Chicago, New York, Los Angeles); Factories: Dominican Republic, El Salvador, Guatemala, Indonesia, Sri Lanka, Vietnam
- Number of employees: 9000 (1981)
- Parent: Samdo Trading Co., Ltd.
- Subsidiaries: Samdo Electronics, Samdo General Construction, Samdo Electric, Samdo Industry, Samdo Apparel, Samdo Chemical, Daeshin Trading, Donghae Terminal, Pungmu Engineering, Samdo Guam Hotel, etc.

Samdo (/sæmdow/ SAM-dow; Korean: 삼도; Hanja: 三都), also known as the Samdo Group (삼도그룹), was a multinational conglomerate of South Korea. It was founded as Samdo Trading Corporation and was involved in textile, garment and zipper manufacturing in 1960s-1990s. Samdo comprised various affiliated businesses including electronics, chemicals, automobile parts and construction.

== Meaning of Samdo ==
Sam-Do (三都) comprises Sam, which means the number three (i.e., heaven, earth, and people), and Do, which means to gather. In other words, the company's management sought appropriate timing, a clear area, and the harmony of people.

== Corporate history ==
Founded in 1960, Samdo Group was a multinational conglomerate that placed in the top 50 in the South Korean economy. It was the first company in South Korea (with Chunwoosa) to export clothing. In 1980s~90s, it operated in 14 countries with approximately 9,000 employees. Samdo received the Gold Tower, the Silver Tower, and the Bronze Tower Order of Industrial Service Merit awards, as well as several Presidential Commendation. In 1979, it was rewarded the "100 Million Dollar Tower" for playing a pioneering role in clothing exports by recording $100 million worth of exports of a single textile product. The Group was dismantled in the early 2000s due to the foreign exchange financial crisis.

=== Founding and growth ===
The Samdo Trading Corporation was founded in 1960 by Kim Man-Joong. It pioneered the export of manufactured clothing products in South Korea.

The company expanded, and factories were established in Suyoung in 1966 and in Eonyang in 1971.

In 1973, Samdo established an additional zipper factory in Eonyang, South Gyeongsang Province, in partnership with German and American zipper brands to support domestic apparel companies that were experiencing difficulties in delivery of manufactured clothing goods. At the time, sewing and manufactured clothing goods were the primary goods of export industry in Korea. Based on the three years of experience with international partners, Samdo developed its own zipper brand, 'DULON’, in 1977 and began producing nylon, plastic, and metal zippers.

In 1963, Samdo Trading Corporation exported $800,000, $2.7 million in 1965, and $35 million in 1973. In November 1979, it achieved $100 million in exports with a single clothing product for the first time in South Korea.

=== Business diversification ===
In 1976, Samdo Trading Corporation went public by listing its shares on the stock exchange. Meanwhile, a new Gyeongju factory was established, and Samdo Electronics, which produced car stereos, was established.

In 1977, Daeshin Trading Co., was acquired, and the zipper factory was doubled.

In 1978, Samdo General Development Co. was established.

In 1979, Samdo General Construction was absorbed and merged with Samdo General Development.

In 1980, Seowoo Co. was acquired.

In 1983, Samyang Textile Co., Daeheung Textile Co., and Dongdo Apparel Co. were absorbed and merged with Samdo Trading Corporation. Sergio Valente was then introduced via Englishtown Sportswear Ltd. in the United States.

In 1987, Saeronball Co., an automobile lamp parts manufacturer, was acquired and changed its name to Samdo Electrics Co. Additionally, Samdo Construction Co. was sold, and Donghae Terminal Co. was acquired.

In the mid-1980s, Samdo Group expanded its business areas to manufacturing and selling leisure goods, art and durable goods. It also expanded to seafood businesses.

In 1990, Samdo Group established P.T Samdonesia in Indonesia in 1989 and Cosmo Macky Industries in Sri Lanka.

=== Financial difficulties and dissolution ===
In the late 1980s, as the textile export economy declined, sales of Samdo Trading Corporation, the parent company, continued to decline. In the 1990s, the corporation was pushed out of the top 50 companies of Korea.

In 1991, a new third office building of 21-story was built in Seoul within the four main gates. It was built on a 1,200-pyeong site across from the Security Headquarters in Sunhwa-dong (currently the National Police Agency), with a total floor area of 13,000 pyeong.

In 1992, Seowoo Co. was renamed as Samdo Apparel. That same year, the U.S. branches, the Chicago branch and the New York branch, which was located in the Empire State Building, were closed.

On February 27, 1995, Samdo Group applied for court receivership. During this period, Samdo Electric, Samdo Industry, Samdo Chemical, Donghae Terminal, Samdo Guam Hotel and Pungmu Engineering were sold. On December 12, it was decided for the Group to begin liquidation.

In 2000, to normalize management, as a merger and acquisition, the Group was taken over by SB Finance Korea (Softbank) in December of that year. Accordingly, in February 2002, the procedure for reorganization was concluded.

== Structure ==
- Parent Company
  - Samdo Trading Co., Ltd. (manufactured and licensed brands: Dulon, Miss Sixty, Absorba, OPT 002, Optilon, Wangja Children's Clothing, Talon, A Comme Ca, Tartine et Chocolat, Commetoi, Sergio Valente)
- Subsidiaries
  - Samdo Electronics
  - Samdo General Construction
  - Samdo Electric
  - Samdo Industry
  - Samdo Apparel
  - Dongdo Apparel
  - Samyang Textile
  - Daeheung Textile
  - Samdo Chemical
  - Daeshin Trading
  - Donghae Terminal
  - Pungmu Engineering
  - Samdo Guam Hotel, etc.

== Key people ==
- Kim Man-Joong – The founder and first chairman of Samdo Group. He is well known as a senior entrepreneur in the textile industry who has played a pioneering role in clothing manufacturing and export. His wife was Chu Young-Soo, and they had three sons and one daughter, Eui-Sun, Sang-Heon, Jae-Heon, and Jae-Ha. From the year of foundation in 1960, Kim ran the company until he passed it on to his sons in 1987. He died in 1996.
- Kim Sang-Heon – The eldest son of Kim Man-Joong. President of Samdo Trading Corporation.
- Kim Jae-Heon – Kim Man-Joong's second son. He led Samdo Group as the Vice Chairman since the 1990s. He graduated from Seoul High School and Hankuk University of Foreign Studies as a French major. Kim received a business administration degree from the University of Southern California in the US. After joining Samdo in 1974, he served as the Head of the Planning and Coordination Office, Head of the US branch, Director of Samdo Electronics and Construction, and Vice President of Samdo Trading Corporation. Kim is married to Jung Myung-Hwa, and they have one son, Jason Kyungmin and one daughter, Nahyun. Jason Kyungmin Kim works on Wall Street in New York, NY, and is married to Seung-Yeon Kang.
- Kim Jae-Ha – The third son of Kim Man-Joong. President of Samdo Apparel.

== Awards ==
At the time, South Korea had few resources and little technology; therefore, earning dollars through exports was regarded as highly patriotic. On November 30, 1964, the total amount of exports in South Korea reached $100 million. This day therefore was designated " Export Day " (now known as Trade Day). Every year, the president of South Korea attends a grand ceremony to award individuals and companies making significant contributions in exports in a given year.

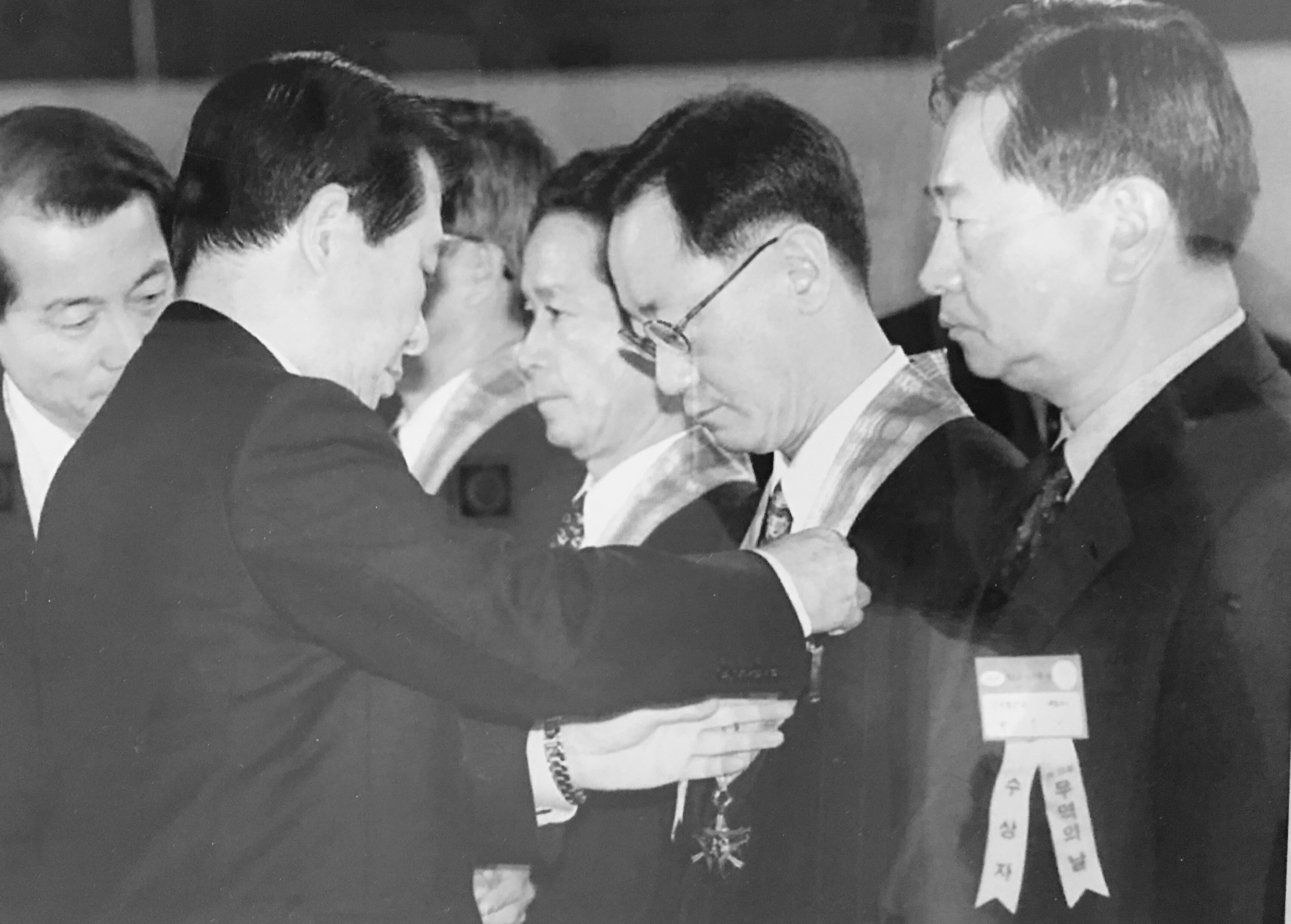
In 1998 Vice Chairman Kim Jae-Heon receiving the Silver Tower Order of Industrial Service Merit from President Kim Dae-Jung

- The Samdo was recognized for its contribution to the South Korean export industry by receiving the Presidential Commendation six times on the annual Trade Day.
- In 1968 on the fifth Trade Day, Samdo was awarded the Bronze Tower Order of Industrial Service Merit.
- In 1976 on the thirteenth Trade Day, Samdo received the Silver Tower Order of Industrial Service Merit.
- In 1977, on the fourteenth Trade Day, Samdo received the Gold Tower Order of Industrial Service Merit, the highest honor for an export company.
- In 1979 on the sixteenth Trade Day, Samdo received the "100 Million Dollar Tower" in recognition of its contribution to achieving the first export of 100 million dollars with a single item of textile product.
- In 1998 on the twenty-fifth Trade Day, Samdo (Daeshin Trade) received the second Silver Tower Order of Industrial Service Merit.

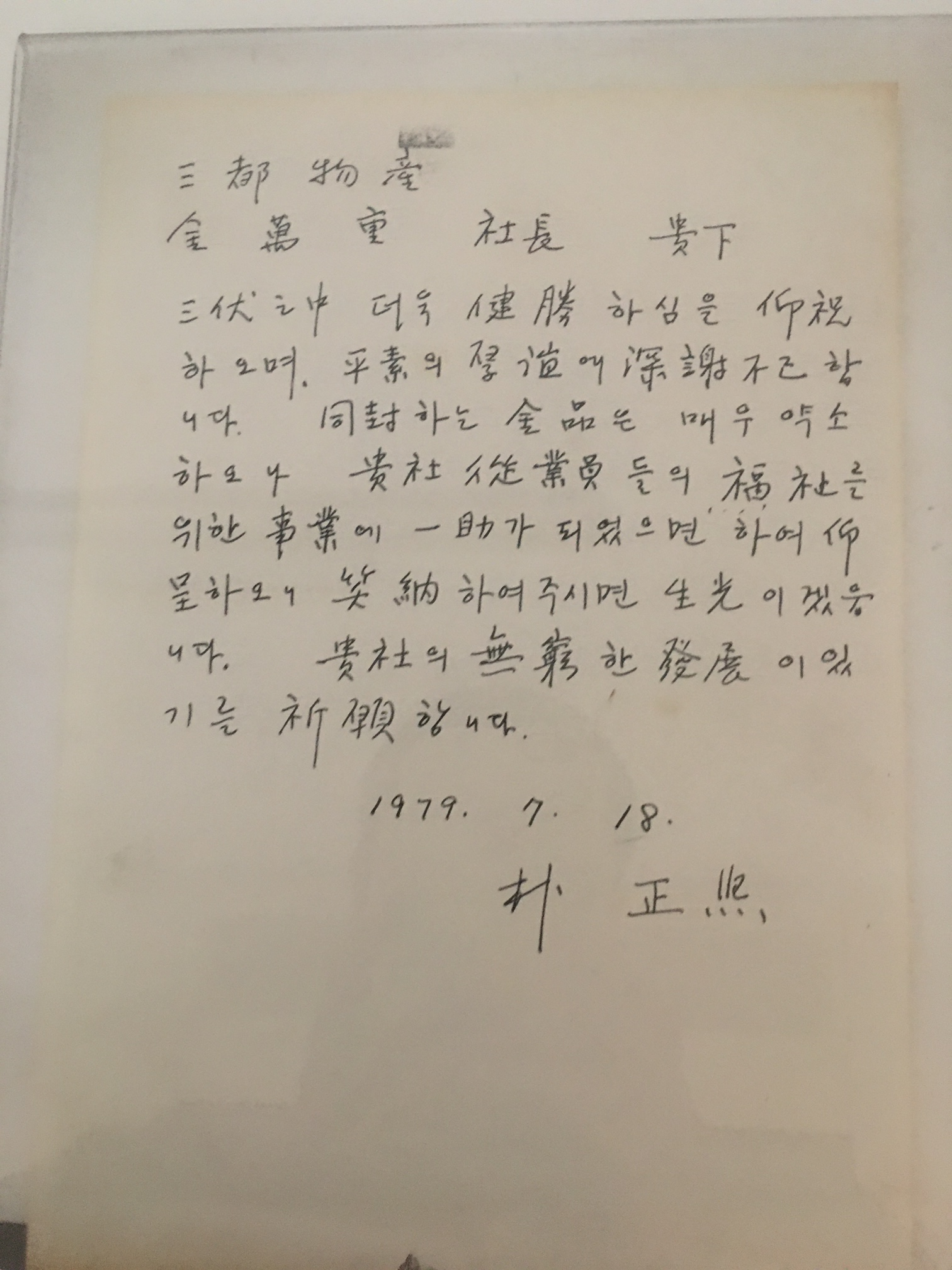
Letter from President Park Chung Hee

Samdo has been recognized personally by the leaders of Korea. The letter (on the left), written by President Park Chung Hee to Samdo Trading Corporation in July 1979 (3 months before he was assassinated), indicates recognition of Samdo's contribution to the national economy and monetary prize to be used for staff welfare and development.

Further, in the 1970s and 1980s, Samdo received the Best Quality Vendor Award from Sears, Roebuck & Company, the largest department store in the U.S. at the time. It also received the Best Supplier Award in the clothing sector from The May Department Stores Company (now Macy's) and the Best Quality Vendor Award from White Stag in the U.S. In addition, Allied named it Best Quality Company. Various overseas partners recognized Samdo as a leading clothing manufacturer.

== Media ==
- Artist Lee Yong-Hwan - Samdo Trading Corporation, 1975
- Samdo Trading Corporation TV Ad 1 - Sergio Valente
- Samdo Trading Corporation TV Ad 2 - Absorba
- Samdo Trading Corporation TV Ad 3 - Wangja Children's Clothing, Commetoi, A Comme Ca
