= SDV International Logistics =

French logistics company

SDV
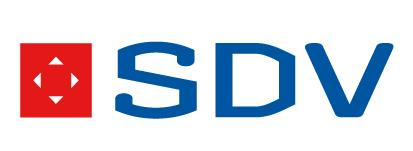
- Company type: Private Company
- Industry: Transport & Logistics
- Founded: 1885
- Headquarters: Puteaux, France
- Area served: Worldwide
- Key people: Herbert de Saint Simon (Chairman), (CEO)
- Number of employees: 35,800 (2014)
- Parent: Bolloré
- Website: www.sdv.com

SDV (SCAC (Société Commerciale d'Affrètement et de Combustibles) Delmas Vieljeux) is a logistics company, a wholly owned subsidiary of the Bolloré Group. It offers services including international transport, customs brokerage, warehousing and distribution, and supply chain management.

With its headquarters in Puteaux, on the western outskirts of Paris, France, the company runs a global network of 600 agencies and employs 35,800 workers in 102 countries.

== History ==
In 1885, SDV was formally established in France as a freight forwarder specializing in trade lanes from France to Africa. Since 1986, SDV has been the main logistics subsidiary of the Bolloré Group.

== Acquisitions ==
The acquisition of the Geis (now SDV Geis) network in Asia and the creation of SDV Geis Germany occurred in 2004. In 2005, SDV acquired India's SWG Logistics. In 2007, SDV also acquired JE Bernard in the United Kingdom to form a single operating organization under the name SDV UK Ltd.

More recently, SDV acquired the majority stake in Italian multimodal transport operator Getco, headquartered in Milan, Italy.

== Organization ==
With a workforce of 35,800 people in the world, SDV is organized in the following five geographical regions:

- Europe
- Africa (Bolloré Africa Logistics)
- ASPAC (regional HQ in Singapore)
- Middle East (regional HQ in Dubai, United Arab Emirates, Delhi, India, and Doha, Qatar)
- Americas (regional HQ in New York City, United States of America)

== Operations ==
It is divided into five main operating segments:

- Multimodal Transport
- Customs and Regulatory Compliance
- Logistics
- Industrial Projects
- Supply Chain

== Services ==
The company offers services to industries such as Oil & Gas, Aerospace, Healthcare, Cosmetics and Perfumes, Fashion, Telecom and High Tech.
