= Eurus Energy =

Japanese energy company

Eurus Energy Holdings Corporation ユーラスエナジーホールディングス株式会社
- Company type: Public KK (unlisted)
- Industry: Wind power industry and Solar power
- Predecessor: Tomen Power Holdings
- Founded: November 1, 2001 (as Tomen Power Holdings)
- Headquarters: Kamiyacho Central Place 7F, 4-3-13, Toranomon, Minato-ku, Tokyo, 105-0001, Japan
- Area served: Japan, Korea, U.S., and Europe
- Key people: Masami Shimizu, President
- Services: Construction and operation of wind farms and solar farms; Project investment; Project finance
- Owner: Toyota Tsusho (60%); TEPCO (40%)
- Number of employees: 184 (as of April 1, 2010)
- Subsidiaries: Eurus Energy Japan; Eurus Energy Korea; Eurus Energy America; Eurus Energy Europe
- Website: Eurus Energy Holdings

Eurus Energy Holdings Corporation is a holding company of the Eurus Energy Group, Japan's largest wind power developer. Eurus Energy is a joint venture of Toyota Tsusho Corporation and Tokyo Electric Power Company (TEPCO). It is headquartered in Minato-ku, Tokyo. It is an Independent Power Producer involved in wind power and photovoltaic power projects in the United States, the United Kingdom, Italy, Spain, Norway, Japan, and South Korea. The total capacity of power plants in operation is 1,986.23 megawatts. "Eurus" is the god of the east wind in Greek mythology.

== Projects ==
Projects in Operation as of February 2016
Region	Wind Power (MW)	Solar Power (MW)	Total (MW)
Japan	648	233	881
Asia/Oceania	191	4	194
America	616	45	661
Europe	865	0	865
Total	2,320	281	2,601

=== Japan ===
Eurus Energy Japan Corporation owns the following onshore wind farms operated by its subsidiaries in Japan.

==== In operation ====
Project	Location	Operator	Capacity (MW)
Tomamae Green Hill Wind Park	Tomamae, Hokkaido	Eurus Energy Tomamae	20
Hamatonbetsu Wind Farm	Hamatonbetsu, Hokkaido	Eurus Energy Hamatonbetsu	3.97
Enbetsu Wind Park	Enbetsu, Hokkaido	Eurus Energy Enbetsu	2.97
Sōya Misaki Wind Farm	Wakkanai, Hokkaido	Eurus Energy Sōya	57
Iwaya Wind Farm	Higashidōri, Aomori	Eurus Energy Iwaya	32.5
Shitsukari Wind Farm	Higashidōri, Aomori	Eurus Energy Shitsukari Hilltop	19.25
Mameda Wind Farm	Yokohama, Aomori	Eurus Energy Yokohama	10.5
Odanosawa Wind Farm	Higashidōri, Aomori	Eurus Energy Odanosawa Wind Park	13
Eurus Hitz Kitanosawa Cliff Wind Farm	Higashidōri, Aomori	Eurus Hitz Kitanosawa Cliff	12
Noheji Wind Farm	Noheji, Aomori	Eurus Energy Noheji	50
Kamaishi Wind Farm	Kamaishi, Tōno, and Ōtsuchi, Iwate	Eurus Energy Kamaishi	42.9
Tashirotai Wind Farm	Kazuno, Akita	Eurus Energy Minami Towada	7.65
Nishime Wind Farm	Nishime, Akita	Eurus Energy Nishime	30
Takine Ojiroi Wind Farm	Tamura and Iwaki, Fukushima	Eurus Energy Takine Ojiroi	46
Satomi Wind Farm	Hitachiōta, Ibaraki	Eurus Energy Satomi	10.02
Aridagawa Wind Farm	Aridagawa, Kainan, and Arida, Wakayama	Eurus Energy Aridagawa	13
Shin Izumo Wind Farm	Izumo, Shimane	Shin Izumo Wind Farm	78
Ōkawara Wind Farm	Tokushima, Tokushima	Ōkawara Wind Farm	19.5
Seto Wind Farm	Ikata, Ehime	Eurus Energy Seto	8
Kihoku Wind Farm	Kihoku, Kagoshima	Eurus Energy Kihoku	20.8

==== Under construction ====
Two wind farms are under construction.

Project	Location	Operator	Capacity (MW)
Date Wind Farm	Date, Hokkaido	Eurus Energy Date	10
Kunimiyama Wind Farm	Kimotsuki, Kagoshima	Eurus Energy Kimotsuki	30

== See also ==
- Wind power in Japan
