= Bolloré Transport & Logistics =

- Type: Public
- Industry: Transport
- Founded: 2008
- Headquarters: 31-32 Quai de Dion Bouton, 92811 Puteaux, France, Cape Town, South Africa
- Key people: Philippe Labonne (CEO)
- Products: Transport, Logistics, Infrastructure construction
- Revenue: € 2.5 billion turnover (2012)
- Number of employees: 25 000 (2013)
- Parent: Bolloré Group
- Website: Bolloré Africa Logistics

Bolloré Group operates in Africa since 1927. In 2008, Bolloré Transport & Logistics was established to consolidate the Bolloré Group infrastructure and logistic activities across the African continent.

Bolloré Transport & Logistics, former Bolloré Africa Logistics, is present in 56 countries worldwide, including 46 in Africa. The company has 250 subsidiaries employing 25,000 permanent staff.

== Network ==
Bolloré Transport & Logistics has active companies in 46 African countries:

Algeria, Angola, Benin, Botswana, Burkina Faso, Burundi, Cameroon, Central African Republic, Chad, Comoros, Congo, Democratic Republic of Congo, Djibouti, Egypt, Equatorial Guinea, Ethiopia, Gabon, Gambia, Ghana, Guinea, Guinea Bissau, Ivory Coast, Kenya, Liberia, Libya, Madagascar, Malawi, Mali, Morocco, Mauritania, Mozambique, Namibia, Niger, Nigeria, Uganda, Rwanda, Senegal, Sierra Leone, South Africa, South Sudan, Sudan, Tanzania, Togo, Tunisia, Zambia, Zimbabwe.

The company also has offices in China, Malaysia, Thailand, Vietnam, India, Australia, the Philippines, Dubaï, the United Kingdom, the United States, Spain, Portugal and France.

== Public-Private Partnership: Ports ==
The company operates 15 container terminals and 11 dry ports through Public-Private Partnerships.

=== Container Terminals ===
TC2 and Abidjan Terminal (Port of Abidjan, Ivory Coast); Bangui Terminal (Port of Bangui, Central African Republic); Benin Terminal (Port of Cotonou, Benin); Congo Terminal (Port of Pointe-Noire, Congo); Conakry Terminal (Port of Conakry, Guinea); Dakar Terminal (Port of Dakar, Senegal); Douala Terminal (Port of Douala, Cameroon); Freetown Terminal (Port of Freetown, Sierra Leone); Misrata Terminal (Port of Misrata, Libya) on-going implementation; Moroni Terminal (Port of Moroni, Comoros); MPS Terminal (Port of Tema, Ghana); Owendo Terminal (Port of Libreville, Gabon); SMTC Terminal (Port of Cotonou, Benin); Tincan Terminal (Port of Lagos, Nigeria); Togo Terminal (Port of Lomé, Togo).

In July, 2020, Conakry Terminal, a subsidiary of Bolloré Ports and operator of the container terminal at the Port of Conakry, officially commissioned the Kagbelen inland container depot located in the municipality of Dubréka, 35 km from the Guinean capital.

=== Dry Ports ===
Lomé (Togo), Lagos (Nigeria), Luanda (Angola), Ngaoundéré (Cameroon), Bélabo (Cameroon), Kinshasa (DRC), Kigali (Rwanda), Kampala (Uganda), Kisumu (Kenya), MCT Mombasa (Kenya); Dar es Salaam (Tanzania).

== Public-Private Partnership: Railways ==
Bolloré Transport & Logistics operates railways under subsidiary companies in the Ivory Coast and Burkina Faso through its subsidiary Sitarail since 1995 and in Cameroon through its subsidiary Camrail since 1999.

== Logistic activities ==
Logistics activities of Bolloré Transport & Logistics are haulage, industrial project logistics, heavy lift, out of gauge transport, rail transport, air transit, barging, port handling, shipping, shipyards, Customs formalities, and Supply chain and warehouse management.

In December 2021, After refusing to comment on market "rumors" announcing its intention to sell its transport and logistics subsidiary in Africa, Bolloré Africa Logistics (BAL), the Bolloré group announced that it had received an offer from the giant Swiss MSC for this subsidiary in Africa.

== See also ==
- SDV
- SAGA
- Bolloré Group
- Camrail
