= Thierry Bolloré =

French businessman (born 1963)

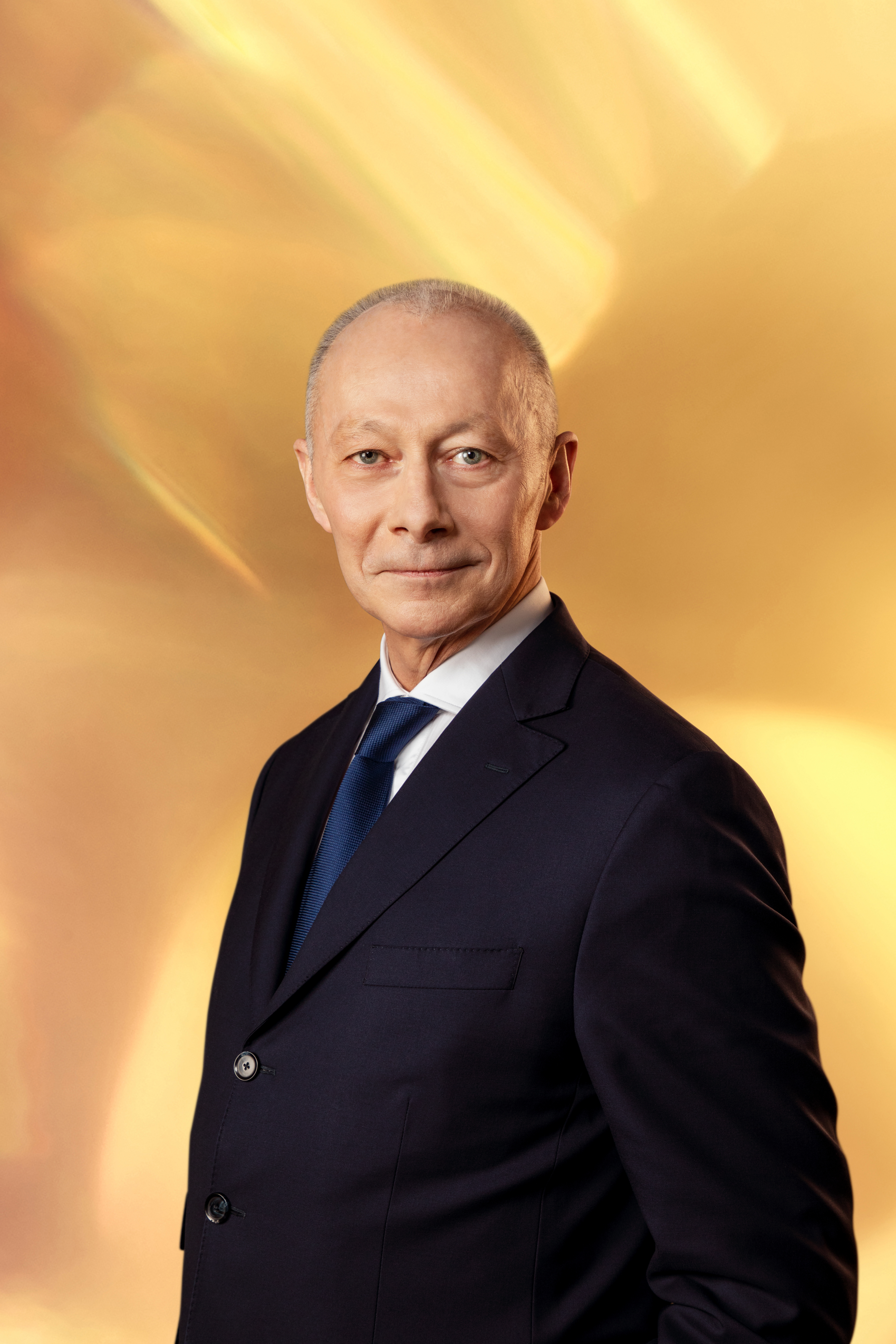
- Bolloré in 2021
- Born: 30 May 1963 (age 63); Quimper, Brittany, France
- Education: Paris Dauphine University (MBA)
- Occupation: Businessman
- Title: CEO of Jaguar Land Rover
- Predecessor: Ralf Speth
- Children: 5
- Family: Bolloré family

Thierry Yves Henri Bolloré (born 30 May 1963) is a French businessman, previously CEO of Jaguar Land Rover. He began his career at Michelin, then joined Faurecia in 2005 and Renault in 2012 as Chief Competitive Officer, then was named COO in 2018, before becoming CEO from November 2018 to October 2019.

Following the arrest of former Renault CEO Carlos Ghosn in November 2018, he was appointed "acting CEO" then CEO of the French carmaker. In October 2019, after growing reports of frictions with Nissan historical partner as well as misuse of company funds in consulting missions with the Boston Consulting Group, he was removed from his position with "immediate effect" by the board gathered for an emergency meeting.

In 2020, he was recruited by British carmaker Jaguar Land Rover as CEO. He resigned from Jaguar Land Rover in November 2022 stating personal reasons.

== Early and personal life ==
Thierry Bolloré was born in Quimper (Brittany, France) on 30 May 1963. He graduated with an MBA from the French Paris Dauphine University.

He enjoys sailing and owns two boats: a Danish sailboat X-37 and a Boston Whaler.

He is the father of five children.

== Career ==
=== Michelin ===
Thierry Bolloré started his career in 1990 when he joined Michelin, the French tyre manufacturer. He was shop manager in a heavy truck tyre factory and then, from 1993, chief of the Process and quality central group for all heavy truck factories worldwide. He then was appointed the head of Method Group for heavy truck business units in Europe, Asia, Africa and South America. Four years later, in 1997, he moved to Japan and became industrial assistant of the Michelin passenger car factory. In 1998, he moved to Thailand, in the role of truck factory production manager. He later became the managing director of truck and aircraft businesses. In 2002, Bolloré was made vice president in charge of industry for Michelin Aircraft Business worldwide.

=== Faurecia ===
In 2005, he left Michelin, moving to China to join Faurecia, an international automotive parts manufacturer, where he was named vice president Asia, exhaust systems product group. He was later made responsible for strategy, marketing, business development and research and development as vice president worldwide. In 2010, he moved to Faurecia Emissions Control Technologies as vice president in charge of Europe and South Africa, then became vice president worldwide, in charge of industry, quality and purchasing.

=== Renault ===
In September 2012, Bolloré joined Renault, the French multinational automobile manufacturer, and one month later he was appointed executive vice president for manufacturing and supply chain. He became chief competitive officer in 2013.

On 19 February 2018, facing insistence from the French state to prepare his succession, Renault CEO Carlos Ghosn appoints Thierry Bolloré as chief operating officer (COO) and second-in-command. The recruitment process, driven by the "compensation committee" of the board and presided by Marc Ladreit de Lacharrière, included both internal and external candidates, although some administrators qualified it as "poorly transparent".

On 19 November 2018, Carlos Ghosn is arrested by Japanese authorities in Tokyo airport. In order to prevent decision-making issues at the head of the carmaker, the board of directors is gathered urgently for an extraordinary session to implement a transitional executive governance: lead independent administrator Philippe Lagayette is appointed chairman and Thierry Bolloré is appointed "Deputy Chief Executive Officer" (acting CEO) "on a temporary basis", "having the same powers as Mr. Carlos Ghosn".

On 24 January 2019, interim governance at the head of the carmaker came to an end, with the nomination of Jean-Dominique Senard as chairman of the board, and Thierry Bolloré as chief executive officer of Renault.

A hallmark of his time as CEO was his worsening relationship with historical industrial partner Nissan. His management style has been commented as "brutal" towards collaborators, leading to a human capital flight of top executives and engineers from Renault to competitors like French carmaker PSA-Peugeot-Citroën, as well as their replacement by managers with poor automotive experience coming from the Boston Consulting Group. The press warns for the first time about an "excessive use of consultants" from the firm.

On 11 October 2019, the board of directors of Renault gathered for an emergency meeting and decided unanimously to dismiss Thierry Bolloré "with immediate effect", condemning his management of men and women of the group and denouncing a hostile attitude towards Japanese industrial partner Nissan. The ousted CEO criticized the decision in the newspaper Les Echos, describing it as a "disturbing coup" and calling for help from the French state (a major shareholder) "in order not to destabilize Renault". The decision from the board was nevertheless backed by the French Minister of the Economy and Finance, reiterating its confidence in chairman Jean-Dominique Senard.

On 18 February 2021, French daily newspaper Le Monde published an investigation into the links between Thierry Bolloré and the American consulting firm Boston Consulting Group. The newspaper reported that after his appointment as Deputy CEO in February 2018, Thierry Bolloré instructed the consultancy to design a transformation program named "Agile@Scale" then "Fast", promising one billion euros additional value for the carmaker, but soon contested. Executives from the group recall "mountains of PowerPoint presentations full with English catch-all terms, jargon and vague principles inondating the company decision-making bodies", written by highly-paid consultants "with a full freedom to come and go around" in the company. The full scope of the contract approximately amounts to 40 million euros. In its response to the newspaper, the Boston Consulting Group "denie[d] categorically all of these interpretations and conclusions" and claimed having been chosen through a "rigorous" tender process. An internal audit has been carried out but its findings have never been made public.

=== Jaguar Land Rover ===
On 28 July 2020, Thierry Bolloré was appointed CEO of English carmarker Jaguar Land Rover, effective in September 2020.

He took office on 10 September 2020 and presented Jaguar Land Rover's new strategic plan on 15 February 2021. Entitled “Reimagine”, this plan aims to reinvent sustainable modern luxury. Jaguar will become a 100% electric brand from 2025 and by 2025, Land Rover will have six 100% electric models. Thierry Bolloré set Jaguar Land Rover a zero carbon target for 2039. In November of 2022, he stepped down from his role at Jaguar Land Rover, citing personal reasons.

BCG were enlisted at JLR too and experience has been similar to that of Renault, described above.

Business positions
| Preceded by Carlos Ghosn | CEO of Renault; 2019 | Succeeded by Luca de Meo |
| Preceded by Sir Ralf Speth | CEO of Jaguar Land Rover; 2020–November 2022 | Incumbent |
