= Ergué-Gabéric =

Ergué-Gabéric An Erge-Vras
- Commune
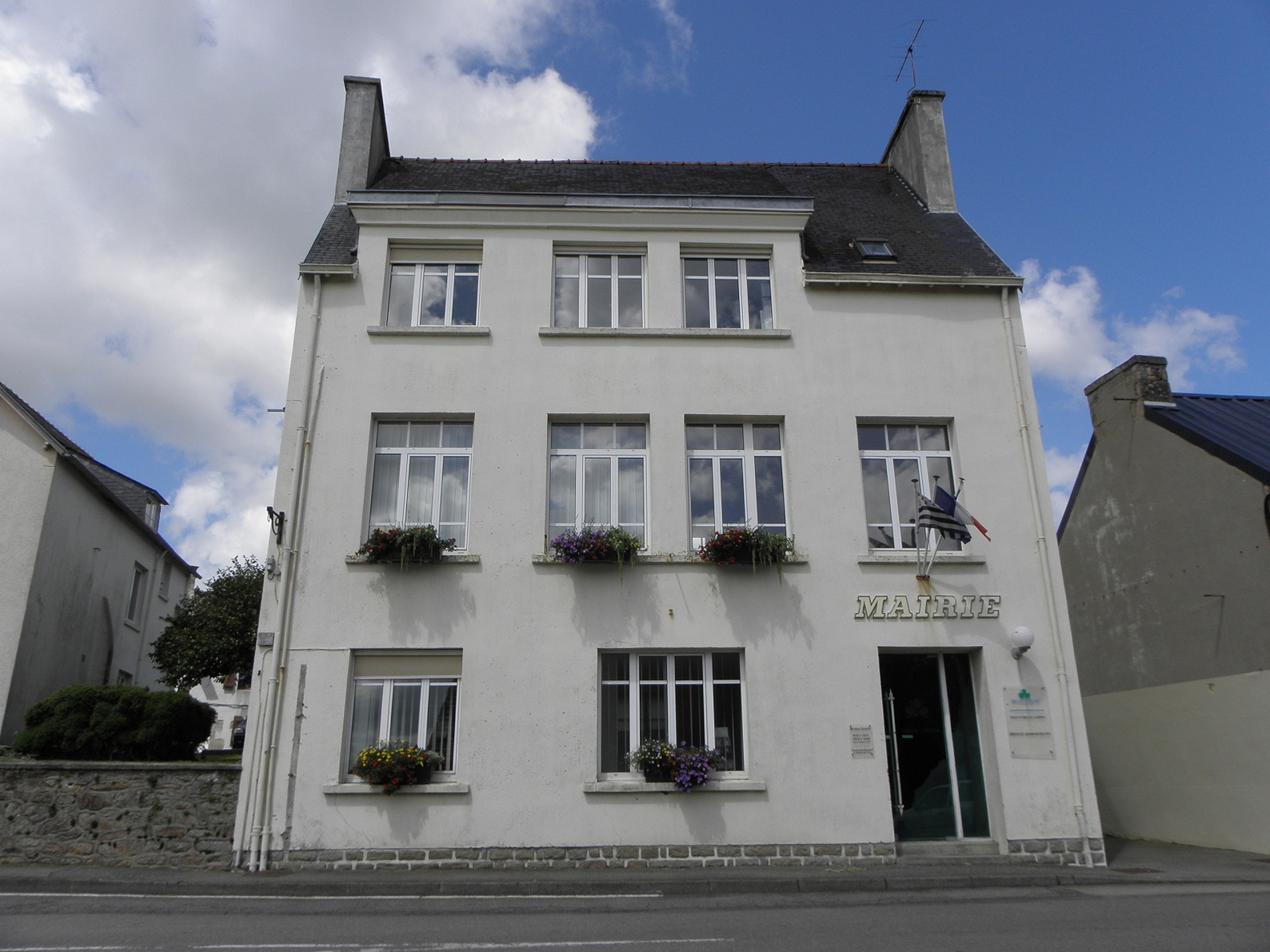
- Ergué-Gabéric Town hall

- Coat of arms
- Location of Ergué-Gabéric
- Location within France Location within Brittany
- Coordinates: 47°59′49″N 4°01′15″W
- Country: France
- Region: Brittany
- Department: Finistère
- Arrondissement: Quimper
- Canton: Fouesnant
- Intercommunality: Quimper Bretagne Occidentale

Government
  - Mayor (2020–2026): Hervé Herry
- Area^{1}: 39.87 km^{2} (15.39 sq mi)
- Highest elevation: 410 m (1,350 ft)
- Lowest elevation: 4 m (13 ft)
- Population (2023): 8,606
  - Density: 215.9/km^{2} (559.1/sq mi)
- Time zone: UTC+01:00 (CET)
  - Summer (DST): UTC+02:00 (CEST)
- INSEE/Postal code: 29051 /29500
- ^{1} French Land Register data, which excludes lakes, ponds, glaciers > 1 km^{2} (0.386 sq mi or 247 acres) and river estuaries.

Ergué-Gabéric (French pronunciation: [ɛʁge gabeʁik]; An Erge Vras in Breton) is a commune in the Finistère department of Brittany in north-western France. It lies on the Odet river. The businessman and publisher Gwenn-Aël Bolloré was born in the commune.

== Population ==
Historical population

Year	Pop.	±% p.a.
1793	1,612	—
1800	1,781	+1.43%
1806	1,813	+0.30%
1821	1,873	+0.22%
1831	2,012	+0.72%
1836	2,025	+0.13%
1841	2,042	+0.17%
1846	2,097	+0.53%
1851	2,158	+0.58%
1856	2,263	+0.95%
1861	2,255	−0.07%
1866	2,286	+0.27%
1872	2,190	−0.71%
1876	2,358	+1.86%
1881	2,319	−0.33%
1886	2,580	+2.16%
1891	2,637	+0.44%
1896	2,529	−0.83%
1901	2,642	+0.88%

Year	Pop.	±% p.a.
1906	2,737	+0.71%
1911	2,828	+0.66%
1921	2,690	−0.50%
1926	2,792	+0.75%
1931	2,684	−0.79%
1936	2,602	−0.62%
1946	2,583	−0.07%
1954	2,610	+0.13%
1962	2,584	−0.13%
1968	2,821	+1.47%
1975	3,950	+4.93%
1982	5,679	+5.32%
1990	6,517	+1.74%
1999	6,925	+0.68%
2007	7,577	+1.13%
2012	8,140	+1.44%
2017	8,208	+0.17%
2023	8,606	+0.79%

Source: EHESS and INSEE (1968–2023)

== International relations ==
It is twinned with Bude-Stratton, Cornwall.

== Sights ==
The church of Saint Gwenhael has a 17th century organ by Thomas Dallam II and his son Toussaint.

== Breton language ==
In 2008, 6.62% of primary-school children attended bilingual schools, where Breton language is taught alongside French.

== Twinning ==
Ergue-Gaberic is twinned with Bude–Stratton in Cornwall, England.

== See also ==
- Communes of the Finistère department
