= Gwenn-Aël Bolloré =

French soldier, businessman, author and publisher

Gwenn-Aël Bolloré (5 September 1925, Ergué-Gabéric – 12 July 2001) was a French soldier, businessman, author, and publisher.

== Biography ==
At the age of 17, Bolloré decided to join in the Free French Forces in England. He sailed across the English Channel in a small boat and met up with his brother René who had arrived in England few months earlier. He lied about his age and his myopia to enroll in the Free French Kieffer Commandos with whom he participated in Normandy Landings on 6 June 1944 by storming the beach and the city of Ouistreham. Bolloré recorded his war memoirs in the book J'ai débarqué le 6 juin 1944: commando de la France libre (I landed June 6, 1944: commando of Free France) and was interviewed in the documentary film Les Grandes batailles du passé (The Great Battles of the Past) produced by Daniel Costelle.

Bolloré was interested in oceanography and earned a doctorate degree from the Oceanographic Museum of Odet. As a filmmaker, he produced several short films and a feature film called "Les naufrageurs (The Wreckers)". He was vice-president of Papeteries Bolloré from 1952 to 1974 and in the 1960s, he was the CEO of La Table Ronde which published a number of books hostile to the Gaullist policy in Algeria and favorable to the OAS.

He was the brother of Michel Bolloré, René Bolloré, Jacqueline Cloteaux and Vincent Bolloré's uncle.

Bolloré wrote books on fishing and England. He has also published essays and poems.

The Prix Bretagne was established at his initiative in 1961.

== Publications ==
- J'ai débarqué le 6 juin 1944 : commando de la France libre , Le Cherche-midi, 2004
- Histoires troubles, Jean Picollec, 1993
- Les Amants de l'espace , Le Cherche Midi, 1985
- Nerfs à fleur de larmes, Saint-Germain-des-Prés, 1982
- Le Diner bleu, La Table Ronde, 1976
- Nous étions 177, France-Empire, 1964
- Destins tragiques du fond des mers, La Table Ronde, 1963
- Guide du pêcheur à, pied. Des conseils pratiques sur tout ce que vous pêchez sur nos cotes, sans bateau, ni canne à pêche et 200 recettes pour accommoder vos prises, La Table Ronde, 1960
- Moïra la naufrageuse, La Table Ronde, 1958
- Anatomie descriptive, Seghers, 1955

== Bibliography ==
- Randa, Phillippe.Les écrivains guerriers. Dualpha, 1998. (in French)
- Bibliothèque littéraire de Gwenn-Aël Bolloré. Sotheby's, Paris, 2002.(in French)
