= Traunstein (electoral district) =

Federal electoral district of Germany

224 Traunstein
- Electoral district for the Bundestag
- Traunstein in 2025
- State: Bavaria
- Population: 283,200 (2019)
- Electorate: 208,678 (2025)
- Major settlements: Traunreut; Traunstein; Bad Reichenhall
- Area: 2,373.6 km^{2}

Current electoral district
- Created: 1949
- Party: CSU
- Member: Siegfried Walch
- Elected: 2025

Traunstein is an electoral constituency (German: Wahlkreis) represented in the Bundestag. It elects one member via first-past-the-post voting. Under the current constituency numbering system, it is designated as constituency 224. It is located in southern Bavaria, comprising the districts of Berchtesgadener Land and Traunstein.

Traunstein was created for the inaugural 1949 federal election. Since 2025, it has been represented by Siegfried Walch of the Christian Social Union (CSU).

== Geography ==
Traunstein is located in southern Bavaria. As of the 2021 federal election, it comprises the districts of Berchtesgadener Land and Traunstein.

== History ==
Traunstein was created in 1949. In the 1949 election, it was Bavaria constituency 11 in the numbering system. In the 1953 through 1961 elections, it was number 206. In the 1965 through 1998 elections, it was number 211. In the 2002 and 2005 elections, it was number 226. In the 2009 through 2021 elections, it was number 225. From the 2025 election, it has been number 224.

Originally, the constituency comprised the independent cities of Traunstein and Bad Reichenhall and the districts of Landkreis Traunstein, Berchtesgaden, and Laufen. From 1976 through 1994, it comprised the districts of Traunstein and Berchtesgadener Land. In the 1998 and 2002 elections, it also contained the Verwaltungsgemeinschaft of Kirchweidach from the Altötting district. It acquired its current borders in the 2005 election.

Election	No.	Name	Borders
1949	11	Traunstein	Traunstein city; Bad Reichenhall city; Landkreis Traunstein district; Berchtesgaden district; Laufen district
1953	206	Traunstein	Traunstein city; Bad Reichenhall city; Landkreis Traunstein district; Berchtesgaden district; Laufen district
1957	206	Traunstein	Traunstein city; Bad Reichenhall city; Landkreis Traunstein district; Berchtesgaden district; Laufen district
1961	206	Traunstein	Traunstein city; Bad Reichenhall city; Landkreis Traunstein district; Berchtesgaden district; Laufen district
1965	211	Traunstein	Traunstein city; Bad Reichenhall city; Landkreis Traunstein district; Berchtesgaden district; Laufen district
1969	211	Traunstein	Traunstein city; Bad Reichenhall city; Landkreis Traunstein district; Berchtesgaden district; Laufen district
1972	211	Traunstein	Traunstein city; Bad Reichenhall city; Landkreis Traunstein district; Berchtesgaden district; Laufen district
1976	211	Traunstein	Traunstein district; Berchtesgadener Land district
1980	211	Traunstein	Traunstein district; Berchtesgadener Land district
1983	211	Traunstein	Traunstein district; Berchtesgadener Land district
1987	211	Traunstein	Traunstein district; Berchtesgadener Land district
1990	211	Traunstein	Traunstein district; Berchtesgadener Land district
1994	211	Traunstein	Traunstein district; Berchtesgadener Land district
1998	211	Traunstein	Traunstein district; Berchtesgadener Land district; Altötting district (only Kirchweidach Verwaltungsgemeinschaft)
2002	226	Traunstein	Traunstein district; Berchtesgadener Land district; Altötting district (only Kirchweidach Verwaltungsgemeinschaft)
2005	226	Traunstein	Traunstein district; Berchtesgadener Land district
2009	225	Traunstein	Traunstein district; Berchtesgadener Land district
2013	225	Traunstein	Traunstein district; Berchtesgadener Land district
2017	225	Traunstein	Traunstein district; Berchtesgadener Land district
2021	225	Traunstein	Traunstein district; Berchtesgadener Land district
2025	224	Traunstein	Traunstein district; Berchtesgadener Land district

== Members ==
The constituency has been held by the Christian Social Union (CSU) during all but one Bundestag term since its creation. It was first represented by Sepp Parzinger of the Bavaria Party (BP) from 1949 to 1953. Wolfgang Klausner of the CSU won it in 1953 and served until 1961. Heinz Brenck was then representative from 1961 to 1969. Matthias Engelsberger served from 1969 to 1990. Peter Ramsauer was elected in 1990, and re-elected in 1994, 1998, 2002, 2005, 2009, 2013, 2017, and 2021. Siegfried Walch retained the seat for the CSU in 2025.

Election	Member	Party	%
1949	Sepp Parzinger	BP	33.6
1953	Wolfgang Klausner	CSU	44.1
1957	Wolfgang Klausner	CSU	55.8
1961	Heinz Brenck	CSU	55.8
1965	Heinz Brenck	CSU	60.5
1969	Matthias Engelsberger	CSU	59.2
1972	Matthias Engelsberger	CSU	63.6
1976	Matthias Engelsberger	CSU	68.4
1980	Matthias Engelsberger	CSU	66.7
1983	Matthias Engelsberger	CSU	68.6
1987	Matthias Engelsberger	CSU	63.3
1990	Peter Ramsauer	CSU	57.4
1994	Peter Ramsauer	CSU	61.1
1998	Peter Ramsauer	CSU	60.1
2002	Peter Ramsauer	CSU	69.0
2005	Peter Ramsauer	CSU	63.9
2009	Peter Ramsauer	CSU	54.6
2013	Peter Ramsauer	CSU	62.6
2017	Peter Ramsauer	CSU	50.3
2021	Peter Ramsauer	CSU	36.6
2025	Siegfried Walch	CSU	46.9

== Election results ==
=== 2025 election ===
Federal election (2025): Traunstein
Notes:	Blue background denotes the winner of the electorate vote. Pink background denotes a candidate elected from their party list. Yellow background denotes an electorate win by a list member, or other incumbent. A ✓ or ✗ denotes status of any incumbent, win or lose respectively.						
Party	Candidate	Votes	%	±%	Party votes	%	±%
CSU	Siegfried Walch	80,507	46.9	▲10.2	66,829	38.8	▲7.3
AfD	Dr. Christoph Birghan	30,995	18.0	▲10.3	34,619	20.1	▲11.5
SPD	Dr. Bärbel Kofler	20,845	12.1	▼4.9	16,925	9.8	▼5.6
Greens	Ulrike Barbara Schweiger	14,985	8.7	▼1.9	17,677	10.3	▼2.0
FW	Hans Jürgen Reiner	10,689	6.2	▼5.2	11,217	6.5	▼6.6
Left	Rudolf Kreuzeder	6,885	4.0	▲1.8	7,515	4.4	▲2.0
BSW					5,905	3.4	
FDP	Albert Walter Duin	3,270	1.9	▼5.6	5,891	3.4	▼6.2
APT					1,450	0.8	▼0.1
dieBasis	Veronika Franziska Herwegh	1,796	1.0	▼1.5	976	0.6	▼1.7
ÖDP	Helmut Kauer	1,782	1.0	▼0.4	1,001	0.6	▼0.3
PARTEI					668	0.4	▼0.3
Volt					662	0.4	▲0.2
BP					441	0.3	▼0.6
BD					134	0.1	
Humanists					86	0.0	Steady
MLPD					28	0.0	Steady
Informal votes		818			548		
Total valid votes		171,754			172,024		
Turnout		172,572	82.7	▲4.2			
CSU hold	Majority	49,512	28.9	▲9.3			

=== 2021 election ===
Federal election (2021): Traunstein
Notes:	Blue background denotes the winner of the electorate vote. Pink background denotes a candidate elected from their party list. Yellow background denotes an electorate win by a list member, or other incumbent. A ✓ or ✗ denotes status of any incumbent, win or lose respectively.						
Party	Candidate	Votes	%	±%	Party votes	%	±%
CSU	✓ Peter Ramsauer	59,555	36.6	▼13.7	51,421	31.5	▼13.1
SPD	Bärbel Kofler	27,644	17.0	▲0.9	25,190	15.4	▲3.6
FW	Andrea Wittmann	18,572	11.4		21,369	13.1	▲10.7
Greens	Wolfgang Ehrenlechner	17,219	10.6	▲2.4	19,985	12.3	▲3.1
AfD	Horst Bernshausen	12,671	7.8	▼2.4	14,027	8.6	▼3.4
FDP	Patrick Weiß	12,268	7.5	▲1.9	15,747	9.7	▲0.5
dieBasis	Martin Hartmann	4,115	2.5		3,669	2.3	
Left	Leon Buchwald	3,537	2.2	▼2.3	3,943	2.4	▼2.9
Tierschutzpartei					1,619	1.0	▲0.2
ÖDP	Bruno Siglreitmaier Jr.	2,372	1.5	▼0.8	1,417	0.9	▼0.2
BP	Stefan Glas	2,160	1.3	▼1.5	1,448	0.9	▼0.9
PARTEI	Marie Stefan	1,857	1.1		1,121	0.7	▲0.2
Pirates					413	0.3	0.0
Independent	Felicitas Englisch	329	0.2				
Volt					265	0.2	
Unabhängige					258	0.2	
Team Todenhöfer					243	0.1	
V-Partei3					153	0.1	▼0.1
Gesundheitsforschung					149	0.1	0.0
Bündnis C					135	0.1	
Humanists					112	0.1	
NPD					101	0.1	▼0.2
du.					85	0.1	
The III. Path					64	0.0	
LKR	Sebastian Oberholzner	295	0.2		56	0.0	
DKP					21	0.0	0.0
MLPD					18	0.0	0.0
Informal votes		1,282			817		
Total valid votes		162,594			163,059		
Turnout		163,876	78.5	▲1.4			
CSU hold	Majority	31,911	19.6	▼14.6			

=== 2017 election ===
Federal election (2017): Traunstein
Notes:	Blue background denotes the winner of the electorate vote. Pink background denotes a candidate elected from their party list. Yellow background denotes an electorate win by a list member, or other incumbent. A ✓ or ✗ denotes status of any incumbent, win or lose respectively.						
Party	Candidate	Votes	%	±%	Party votes	%	±%
CSU	✓ Peter Ramsauer	80,056	50.3	▼12.3	71,196	44.6	▼12.6
SPD	Bärbel Kofler	25,659	16.1	▼1.4	18,916	11.9	▼3.0
AfD	Hansjörg Müller	16,276	10.2		19,191	12.0	▲8.8
Greens	Andreas Herden	12,972	8.1	▼0.4	14,680	9.2	▲0.4
FDP	Alexander Reich	9,034	5.7	▲3.3	14,614	9.2	▲4.8
Left	Norbert Eberherr	7,144	4.5	▲1.5	8,508	5.3	▲2.3
FW					3,811	2.4	▲0.4
BP	Konrad Baueregger	4,547	2.9		2,924	1.8	▲0.5
ÖDP	Agnes Thanbichler	3,537	2.2	▼0.2	1,690	1.1	▼0.3
Tierschutzpartei					1,212	0.8	▲0.1
PARTEI					789	0.5	
Pirates					443	0.3	▼1.2
DM					361	0.2	
NPD					349	0.2	▼0.3
V-Partei³					237	0.1	
DiB					229	0.1	
Gesundheitsforschung					184	0.1	
BGE					175	0.1	
BüSo					22	0.0	0.0
DKP					22	0.0	
MLPD					16	0.0	0.0
Informal votes		1,390			1,046		
Total valid votes		159,225			159,569		
Turnout		160,615	77.0	▲8.7			
CSU hold	Majority	54,397	34.2	▼10.8			

=== 2013 election ===
Federal election (2013): Traunstein
Notes:	Blue background denotes the winner of the electorate vote. Pink background denotes a candidate elected from their party list. Yellow background denotes an electorate win by a list member, or other incumbent. A ✓ or ✗ denotes status of any incumbent, win or lose respectively.						
Party	Candidate	Votes	%	±%	Party votes	%	±%
CSU	✓ Peter Ramsauer	87,598	62.6	▲8.0	80,351	57.3	▲8.5
SPD	Bärbel Kofler	24,570	17.6	▲2.3	20,875	14.9	▲2.3
Greens	Bernhard Zimmer	11,973	8.6	▼3.0	12,334	8.8	▼2.8
Left	Franz Lindlacher	4,117	2.9	▼1.4	4,193	3.0	▼2.1
ÖDP	Wilhelm Winkler	3,390	2.4	▲0.7	1,843	1.3	▼0.1
FDP	Sandra Sonntag	3,313	2.4	▼4.8	6,139	4.4	▼8.5
AfD					4,597	3.3	
FW					2,843	2.0	
Pirates	Christoph Matthias Schmid	3,034	2.2		2,116	1.5	▲0.2
BP					1,808	1.3	▼0.2
Tierschutzpartei					912	0.6	0.0
REP		1,917	1.4		813	0.6	▼0.4
NPD					771	0.5	▼0.6
DIE VIOLETTEN					202	0.1	▼0.1
DIE FRAUEN					187	0.1	
Party of Reason					164	0.1	
PRO					85	0.1	
RRP					43	0.0	▼0.8
BüSo					36	0.0	▼0.1
MLPD					18	0.0	0.0
Informal votes		1,544			1,126		
Total valid votes		139,912			140,330		
Turnout		141,456	68.4	▼1.1			
CSU hold	Majority	63,028	45.0	▼5.6			

=== 2009 election ===
Federal election (2009): Traunstein
Notes:	Blue background denotes the winner of the electorate vote. Pink background denotes a candidate elected from their party list. Yellow background denotes an electorate win by a list member, or other incumbent. A ✓ or ✗ denotes status of any incumbent, win or lose respectively.						
Party	Candidate	Votes	%	±%	Party votes	%	±%
CSU	✓ Peter Ramsauer	76,741	54.6	▼9.3	68,886	48.8	▼8.7
SPD	Bärbel Kofler	21,406	15.2	▼6.4	17,747	12.6	▼7.2
Greens	Bernhard Zimmer	16,188	11.5	▲5.5	16,341	11.6	▲4.5
FDP	Alfred Pecha	10,142	7.2	▲3.6	18,243	12.9	▲4.7
Left	Engelbert Wurm	6,156	4.4	▲1.7	7,122	5.0	▲2.3
BP	Anna-Elisabeth Stefanutti-Bscheidl	2,860	2.0		2,163	1.5	▲0.8
ÖDP	Hermann Hofstetter	2,409	1.7		1,927	1.4	
Pirates					1,868	1.3	
NPD	Patrick Hermann Schröder	2,063	1.5	▼0.1	1,641	1.2	0.0
REP					1,420	1.0	▼0.1
RRP	Roland Lohmeier	1,296	0.9		1,188	0.8	
Tierschutzpartei					864	0.6	
Freie Union	Sebastian Lehrberger	749	0.5				
FAMILIE					727	0.5	▼0.1
DIE VIOLETTEN					325	0.2	
CM					249	0.2	
PBC					245	0.2	▼0.2
BüSo	Alois Krumbachner	608	0.4		139	0.1	0.0
DVU					71	0.1	
MLPD					16	0.0	0.0
Informal votes		1,966			1,402		
Total valid votes		140,618			141,182		
Turnout		142,584	69.5	▼8.2			
CSU hold	Majority	55,335	39.4	▼2.9			

=== 2005 election ===
Federal election (2005):Traunstein
Notes:	Blue background denotes the winner of the electorate vote. Pink background denotes a candidate elected from their party list. Yellow background denotes an electorate win by a list member, or other incumbent. A ✓ or ✗ denotes status of any incumbent, win or lose respectively.						
Party	Candidate	Votes	%	±%	Party votes	%	±%
CSU	✓ Peter Ramsauer	99,041	63.9	▼5.0	89,686	57.5	▼9.6
SPD	Bärbel Kofler	33,582	21.7	▲1.5	30,823	19.8	▲0.7
Greens	Andreas Graichen	9,390	6.1	▼0.4	11,072	7.1	▲0.1
FDP	Arnold Pecha	5,567	3.6	▲1.1	12,844	8.2	▲4.6
Left	Peter Kurz	4,102	2.6	▲2.1	4,339	2.8	▲2.3
NPD	Manfred von Gorkom	2,373	1.5		1,752	1.1	▲1.0
REP					1,776	1.1	▲0.4
BP					1,162	0.7	▲0.5
PBC	Alexander Gehl	1,036	0.7		542	0.3	▲0.2
Familie					952	0.6	
GRAUEN					458	0.3	▲0.2
Feminist					325	0.2	▲0.1
BüSo					125	0.1	0.0
MLPD					51	0.0	
Informal votes		2,553			1,737		
Total valid votes		155,091			155,907		
Turnout		157,644	77.7	▼4.1			
CSU hold	Majority	65,459	42.2				
