= Sebastian Frankenberger =

German politician

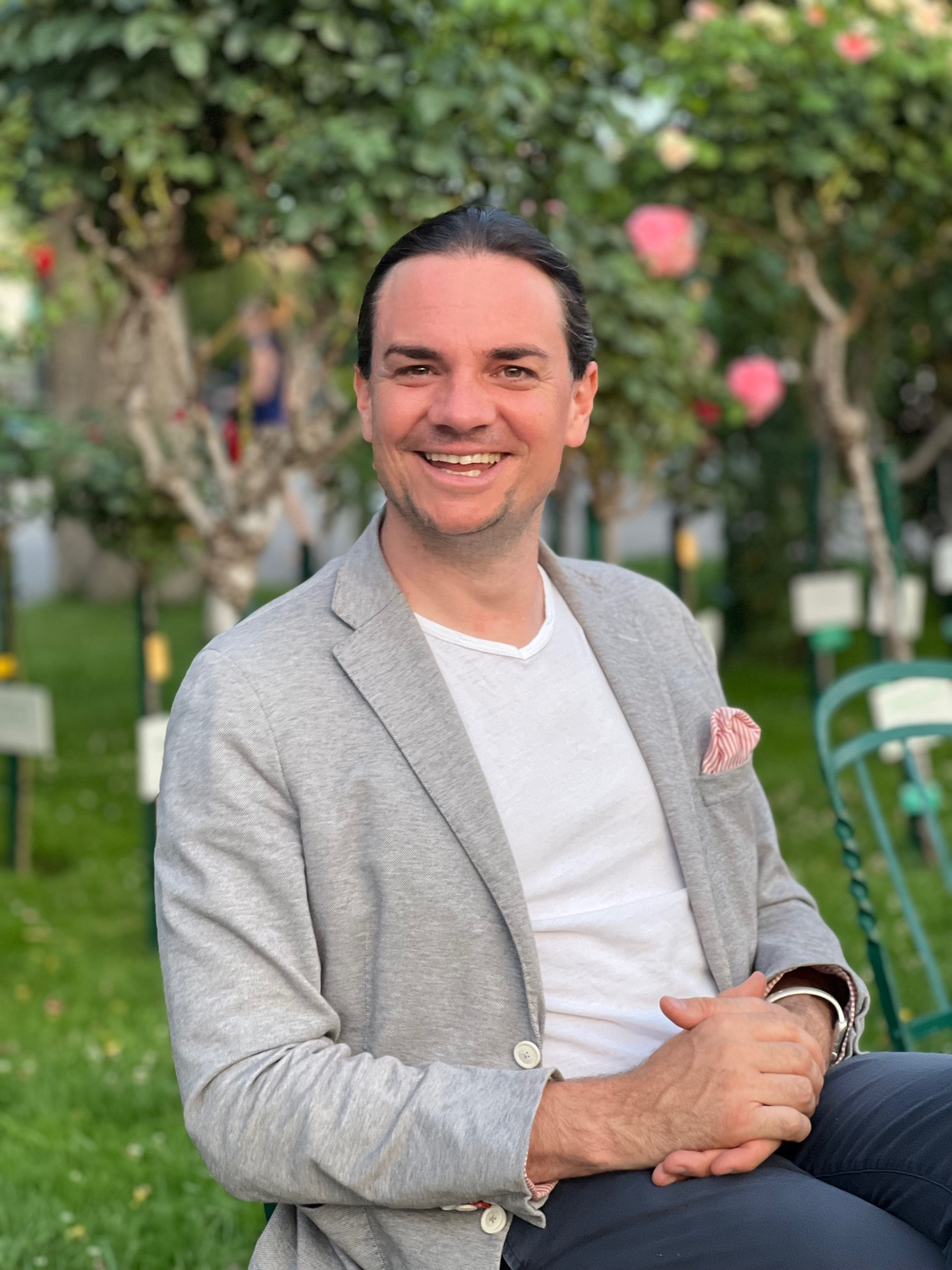
- Sebastian Frankenberger (2024)
- Born: September 17, 1981 (age 45); Passau (Bavaria, Germany)

Sebastian Korbinian Frankenberger (born September 17, 1981, in Passau) is a German politician. He was the federal chairman of the Ecological Democratic Party (ÖDP) from 2010 to 2014 and a member until 2015. He gained nationwide recognition in 2009 as the initiator of the successful citizens' initiative (referendum) "For genuine protection against smoking!" in Bavaria.

== Political Career ==
During his school years, Frankenberger was elected district student representative for Lower Bavaria and later became involved as a student senator at the University of Passau. Initially, he was a member of the Schüler Union (Student Union), which he chaired in Passau, and also a member of the Christian Social Union in Bavaria (CSU). In 2004, he left the CSU and joined the Ecological Democratic Party (ÖDP). He played a key role in the 2008 local election campaign for the ÖDP, was elected to the Passau City Council, and served on it from 2008 to 2011. On February 19, 2015, following internal disagreements, he announced his resignation from the ÖDP and his withdrawal from politics.

In 2026, Frankenberger was elected to the Passau city council as an independent candidate for the FDP.

== Contemporary witness interviews ==
- Initial situation in Bavaria before the ‘non-smokers' protection referendum’ between 2000 and 2008, HdBG 2016, 3 min
- ÖDP initiative for ‘non-smoker protection’, which culminated in the 2009 referendum, HdBG 2016, 4 min
- The course of the ‘non-smokers' protection referendum’ during the 14-day registration period in 2009 and his rise to the face of the campaign, HdBG 2016, 4 min
- Election campaign and victory in the 2010 referendum on smoking bans, HdBG 2016, 4 min
- Media coverage of the ‘non-smokers' protection referendum’ led to hostility and death threats, HdBG 2016, 4 min

== Awards ==
In 2010, Elisabeth Engelsberger-Hinke (CSU; daughter of Matthias Engelsberger) called for the Bavarian Order of Merit for Frankenberger.

== Bibliography ==
- People, Decide! – Visions of a Christian Political Rebel. Autobiography. Kösel-Verlag, Munich 2011, ISBN 978-3-466-37025-2
- "Digital Public Affairs: Social Media for Companies, Associations, and Politics." Essay co-authored with Sofie Langmeier. "The Integrated Campaign: How Digital Media Lead to the Success of a Referendum." Helios Media, Cologne 2011, ISBN 978-3-942263-09-2
