= Christian Ehler =

German politician (born 1963)

Christian Ehler MEP
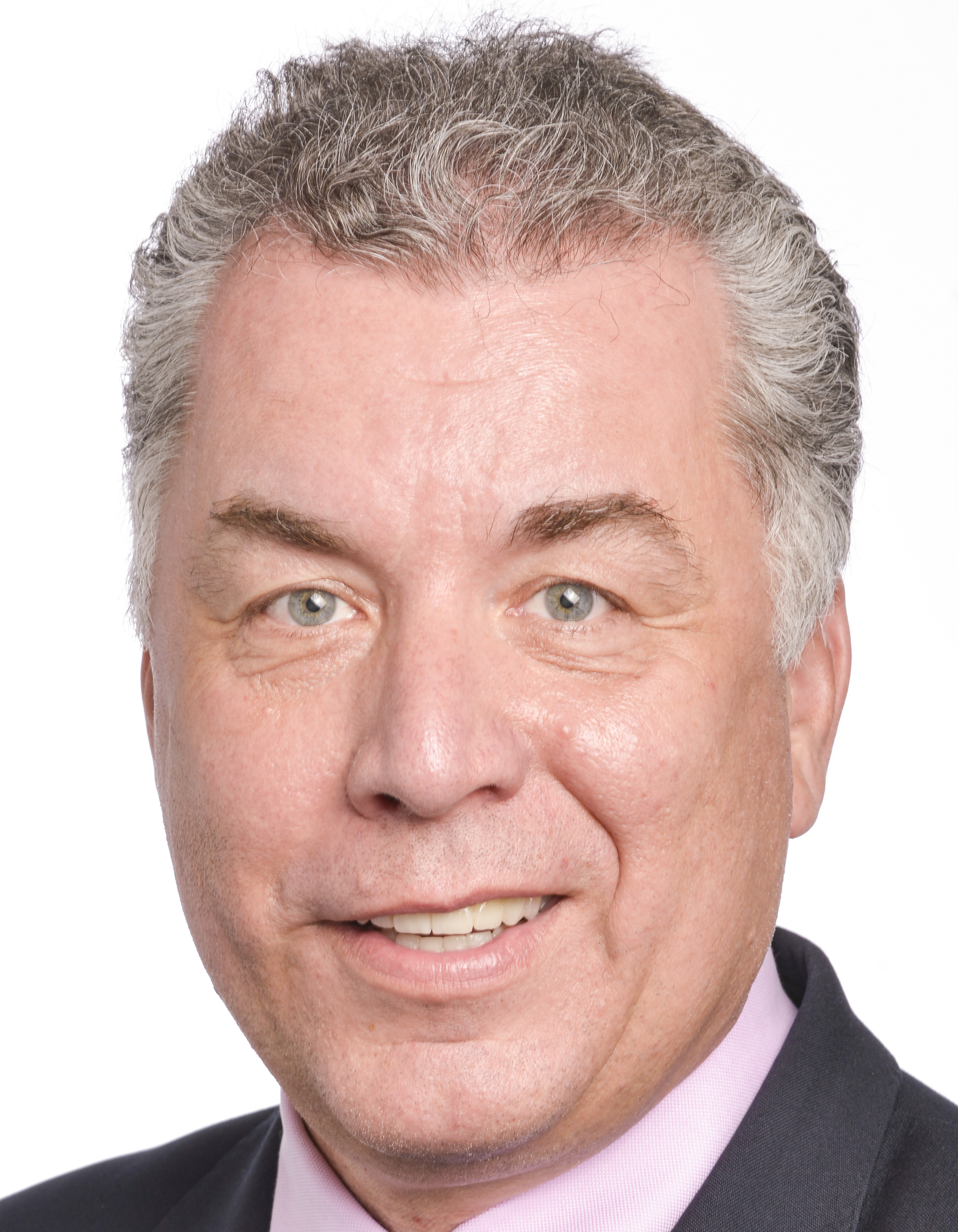

Member of the European Parliament
- Incumbent
- Assumed office 20 July 2004
- Constituency: Germany

Personal details
- Born: Jan Christian Ehler; 17 August 1963 (age 63) Munich, Germany
- Party: German; Christian Democratic Union; EU; European People's Party
- Education: LMU Munich
- Website: www.christian-ehler.de

Jan Christian Ehler (born 17 August 1963) is a German politician who has been serving as a Member of the European Parliament since 2004. He is a member of the Christian Democratic Union, part of the European People's Party.

== Early life and education ==
Ehler grew up in Munich. After completing his Abitur at Gymnasium Staatliches Landschulheim Marquartstein in 1984, he began a three-year training programme at the Deutsche Journalistenschule in Munich. From 1986 to 1993, Ehler studied journalism, political science and economics at LMU Munich.

From 1989 to 1990, he studied economics at the American University in Washington, D.C. During his studies, he completed internships with Dr. Otto Graf Lambsdorff in the German Bundestag and U.S. Senator John Heinz. In 1993, he received a doctorate for his dissertation on U.S. trade policy.

== Professional career ==
Between 1992 and 1997, Ehler worked for the Aigner Group, initially in staff and project management positions and later as managing director. From 1997 to 1998, he was managing partner of the WISO Institute (Institute for Economic and Social Research). From 1998 to 2000, he served as managing director of Projektgesellschaft Bahnerprobungs- und Technologiezentrum Berlin/Brandenburg GmbH. In 2000, he became managing director of Biotech GmbH – BioTechnologieZentrum Hennigsdorf, later known as co:bios Technologiezentrum, a position he held until 2010.

== Political career ==
=== Career in state politics ===
Ehler was elected to the Brandenburg State Parliament during the 1999 elections, where he served until 2004. As a member of the Christian Democratic Union (CDU) parliamentary group, he was the group’s spokesperson for economic and technology policy. He was also a member of the Committee on Economic Affairs and the Committee on European Affairs and Development Policy, and served as a substitute member of the Committee on Budgetary and Financial Affairs.

Alongside his parliamentary work, Ehler held several positions within the CDU and its business association. He became chairman of the Brandenburg branch of the Mittelstands- und Wirtschaftsunion (MIT) in 2000 and served as its federal vice-chairman from 2003 to 2007. He has also been a member of the CDU Brandenburg’s state executive board and presidium since 2003.

=== Member of the European Parliament, 2004–present ===
Ehler has been a Member of the European Parliament since 2004, representing the Christian Democratic Union within the European People’s Party (EPP) Group. During his first parliamentary term, he served on the Committee on International Trade (INTA) from 2004 to 2005 and, on the Committee on Economic and Monetary Affairs (ECON) from 2005 to 2009. He was also a substitute member of the Committee on Industry, Research and Energy (ITRE) and, from 2006, of the Subcommittee on Security and Defence (SEDE).

In 2009, during his second Parliamentary term, Ehler became a full member of both the ITRE and SEDE Committes. From 2009 to 2012, he chaired the Parliament’s delegation for relations with the Korean Peninsula, before becoming chair of the delegation for relations with the United States from 2012 to 2014.

During the 2014–2019 parliamentary term, his third, he served as First Vice-Chair of SEDE and as co-coordinator of the EPP Group in ITRE. He also chaired the delegation for relations with the United States from 2017 to 2019. In 2018, Ehler was appointed rapporteur for the specific programme implementing Horizon Europe, the EU’s research and innovation framework programme for 2021-2027.

Following his re-election in 2019, Ehler became the EPP Group’s coordinator in ITRE and a substitute member of the Committee on Culture and Education (CULT). He continued as a member of the delegation for relations with the United States and became a substitute member of the delegation for relations with Israel and the delegation to the Parliamentary Assembly of the Union for the Mediterranean. Since 2022, Ehler has chaired the European Parliament’s Panel for the Future of Science and Technology (STOA).

Following his re-election in 2024, he remained a member of ITRE and the EPP Group’s coordinator in the committee. He also became a substitute member of the Committee on Budgets (BUDG) and a member of the delegation for relations with the Maghreb countries and the Arab Maghreb Union. In November 2025, he was appointed rapporteur for the Horizon Europe framework programme for 2028–2034 and the European Competitiveness Fund.

== Political memberships ==
- CDU Brandenburg State Association, Board Member
- District Association CDU Potsdam, Board Member and Committee Member
- German Parliamentary Society, Member

== Other activities ==
- lit:potsdam Literature Festival, Member of the Board
- Fashion Council Germany, Member of the Executive Committee
- Freundeskreis Schloss Wiepersdorf - Bettina und Achim von Arnim Museum, Advisory Board Member
- EUNICE University, Advisory Board Member
- Atlantik-Brücke, Member
- International Society for Human Rights (IGFM), Member of the Godparenthood Program for Political Prisoners in Cuba
- Jerusalem Foundation, Member
- Schützenverein Henningsdorf, Member
- United Europe, Member
