= Peter Ramsauer =

German politician (born 1954)

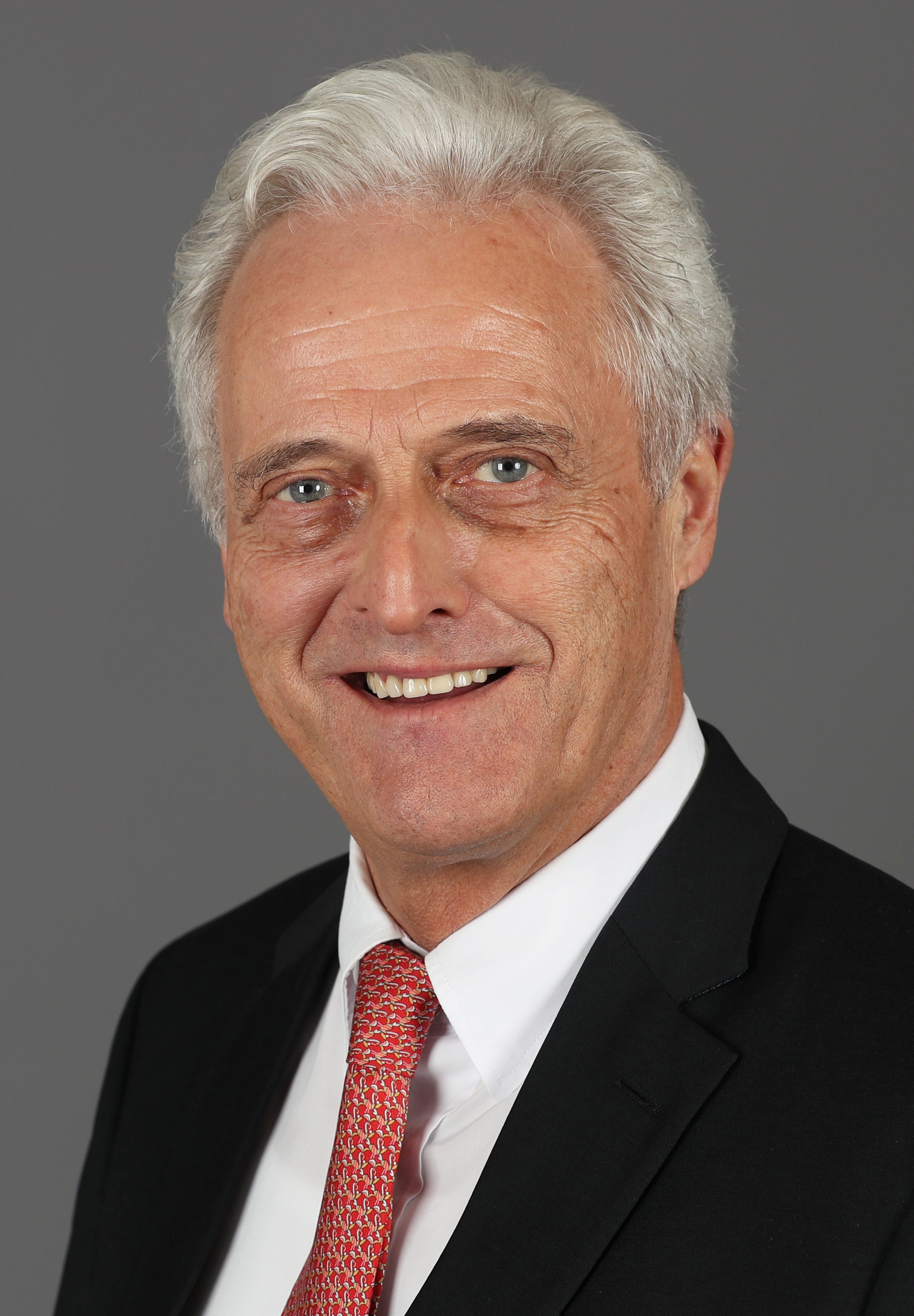
- Ramsauer in 2020

President by right of age of the Bundestag
- In office 26 December 2023 – 25 March 2025
- Preceded by: Wolfgang Schäuble
- Succeeded by: Gregor Gysi

Minister for Transport, Building and Urban Development
- In office 28 October 2009 – 17 December 2013
- Chancellor: Angela Merkel
- Preceded by: Wolfgang Tiefensee
- Succeeded by: Alexander Dobrindt

Leader of the CSU Group in the Bundestag
- In office 21 November 2005 – 28 October 2009
- Preceded by: Michael Glos
- Succeeded by: Hans-Peter Friedrich

Member of the Bundestag; for Traunstein
- In office 20 December 1990 – 25 March 2025
- Preceded by: Matthias Engelsberger
- Succeeded by: Siegfried Walch

Personal details
- Born: 10 February 1954 (age 72) Munich, West Germany
- Party: Christian Social Union
- Spouse: Susanne
- Children: 4
- Education: LMU Munich

Peter Ramsauer (born 10 February 1954) is a German politician of the Christian Social Union in Bavaria (CSU) who served as the Federal Minister of Transport, Building and Urban Development in the Second Merkel cabinet.

== Early life and education ==
Ramsauer completed his Abitur at the Staatliches Landschulheim Marquartstein gymnasium in 1973—with a year abroad at Eton College—and studied business economics at LMU Munich, where he obtained his Diploma in 1979 and his PhD in 1985.

Ramsauer has also qualified as a professional miller in accordance with the traditional occupation of his ancestry. He speaks English and French.

He is married and has four daughters. His wife Susanne, a home economics teacher, is a cousin of German-American actress Sandra Bullock.

== Political career ==
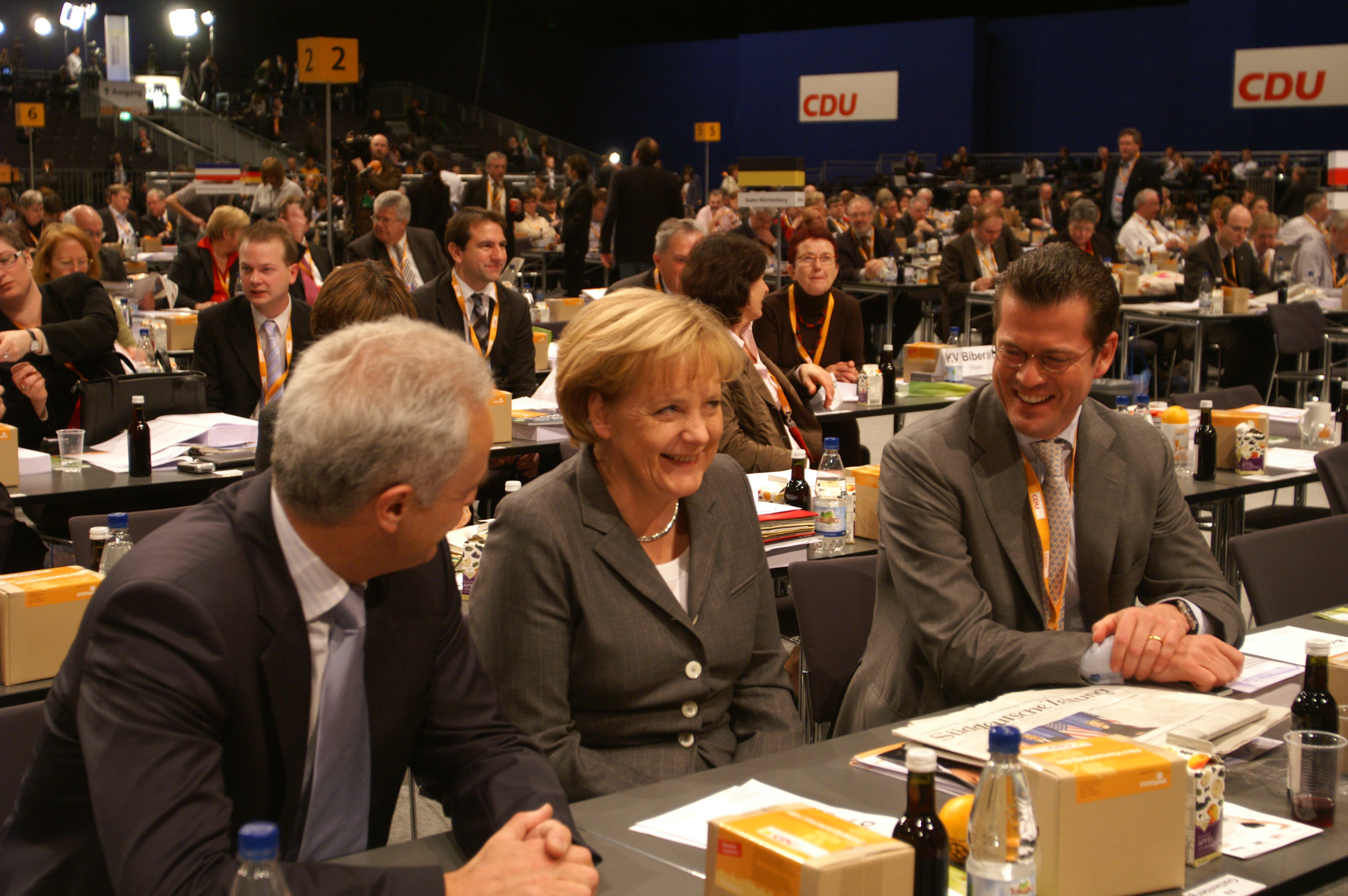
Ramsauer and Merkel with Karl-Theodor zu Guttenberg at a CDU party conference, 2008

Ramsauer joined the conservative Young Union (JU) youth organisation in 1972 and the CSU in 1973. He was elected Bavarian vice-chairman of the JU in 1983 and vice-chairman of the CSU in 2008.

In 1978 Ramsauer obtained a seat in the municipal diet (Stadtrat) of Traunreut and in 1984 became a member of the district assembly of Traunstein.

Ramsauer ran successfully in the 1990 federal election and has been a member of the Bundestag for Traunstein since then. From 1998 to 2005 he served as CSU Chief Whip of the CDU/CSU parliamentary group. As such, he was also a member of the parliament's Council of Elders, which – among other duties – determines daily legislative agenda items and assigning committee chairpersons based on party representation.

Ramsauer was elected to the head of the Bundestag group of CSU parliamentarians in 2005, succeeding Michael Glos; in that capacity, he led the CDU/CSU parliamentary group with his co-chair from the CDU, Volker Kauder. From 2005 until 2009, he also served on the Committee on the Election of Judges (Wahlausschuss), which is in charge of appointing judges to the Federal Constitutional Court of Germany.In the 2009 elections Ramsauer was re-elected by 54.6 percent of the votes cast.

On 28 October 2009 Ramsauer was appointed Federal Minister of Transport, Building and Urban Development at the behest of Chancellor Angela Merkel, succeeding Wolfgang Tiefensee. On the occasion of the sixtieth anniversary of the diplomatic relations between German and India, he participated in the first joint cabinet meeting of the two countries’ governments in Delhi in May 2011.

After leaving government following the 2013 elections, Ramsauer chaired the Committee on Economic Affairs and Energy (2013–2017) and later the Committee on Economic Cooperation and Development (2017–2021). In the negotiations to form another coalition government under the leadership of Merkel following the 2017 federal elections, he was part of the working group on economic policy, led by Thomas Strobl, Alexander Dobrindt and Brigitte Zypries.

In early 2020, Ramsauer co-founded an informal cross-party group of MPs from the CDU, CSU and FDP parties who opposed a potential coalition government between CDU/CSU and the Green Party.

Following the 2021 elections, Ramsauer served on the Committee on Foreign Affairs. In 2023, he became the Alterspräsident (Father of the House) of the Bundestag following the death of Wolfgang Schäuble.

In February 2024, Ramsauer announced that he would not stand in the 2025 federal elections but instead resign from active politics by the end of the parliamentary term.

== Political positions ==
=== Economic policy ===
In 2010, in his capacity as transport minister, Ramsauer rejected plans for an initial public offering of rail operator Deutsche Bahn, arguing that the company first needed to focus on improving quality, security, cleanliness, punctuality and reliability of its trains.

In 2014, Ramsauer publicly criticized France for announcing plans to buy a 20 percent stake in Alstom despite its heavy debts and budget deficit and accused the country's government of showing "ice-cold" national interests in choosing U.S. firm General Electric over German Siemens for an alliance with Alstom. When Deutsche Bank came under pressure after the United States Department of Justice requested it pay $14 billion to settle claims of mis-selling mortgage-backed securities in 2016, Ramsauer accused the Obama Administration of measures that "have the characteristics of an economic war."

In October 2016, Ramsauer accompanied Federal Minister for Economic Affairs and Energy Sigmar Gabriel to Tehran to attend the German-Iranian Joint Economic Commission's first meeting in 15 years.

=== Relations to Russia ===
In 2007, Ramsauer accompanied Minister President Edmund Stoiber of Bavaria to a meeting with President Vladimir Putin. In July 2010, he accompanied Merkel on an official trip to Moscow for meetings with President Dmitry Medvedev.

Amid a 2014 debate over whether Germany needs to rethink its energy strategy and reduce its dependence on Russian gas imports due to the Russo-Ukrainian War, Ramsauer spoke out in favour of considering importing shale gas from the United States, or alternative embracing "domestic resources". In November 2015, in his capacity as chairman of the German Parliament's Committee on Economic Affairs and Energy, he agreed with his Russian counterpart Ivan Grachev to set up an informal German-Russian working group on energy cooperation, convening parliamentarians and business representatives from both countries.

=== European integration ===
On 27 January 2015, Ramsauer voted against the Merkel government’s proposal for a four-month extension of Greece's bailout; in doing so, he joined a record number of 29 dissenters from the CDU/CSU parliamentary group who expressed scepticism about whether the Greek government under Prime Minister Alexis Tsipras could be trusted to deliver on its reform pledges.

=== LGBT ===
In June 2017, Ramsauer voted against Germany's introduction of same-sex marriage.

== Controversy ==
=== Recognition of the Polish-German border ===
During a ballot in Bundestag on 17 October 1991, Ramsauer voted against officially accepting the Oder-Neisse line, which serves as the border between Germany and Poland since the aftermath of World War II, as the final Polish-German Frontier.

=== Alleged racist attack ===
In 2016, Peter Ramsauer was accused of making a racist attack against a photojournalist during a meeting between Greek Prime Minister Alexis Tsipras and German Vice-Chancellor Sigmar Gabriel. During the German Delegation's visit at the Greek Prime Minister's official seat, Ramsauer had an accidental physical contact with the photojournalist. The photographer stated that Ramsauer attacked him saying, "Don't touch me you filthy Greek" first in German language ("Fass mich nicht an, Du dreckiger Grieche") and later in English. Ramsauer denied the insult on several occasions but confirmed having received unpleasant physical contact with a photographer at the event. The incident made the news in Germany and in Greece. Ramsauer had been the most prominent politician in Germany to come out in favour of Greece leaving the eurozone.

== Other activities ==
Peter Ramsauer is a member of a conservative student fraternity based in Munich, Franco-Bavaria, which left its former association Deutsche Burschenschaft in 2013 to distance itself from right-wing extremism.

Since June 2014, Ramsauer has been the President of the Ghorfa Arab German Chamber of Commerce and Industry, an association that facilitates the commercial documents of businesses that want to export to Arab countries. Ghorfa has been the subject of controversy for issuing certificates verifying that no parts of an exported product were produced in Israel.

He has been described as a "shepherd" of the German language, seeking to avoid English loanwords.

=== Corporate boards ===
- La Natura Lifestyle International Holding, Member of the International Advisory Board (since 2024)
- Watzl Group GmbH, Member of the Advisory Board (since 2023)
- Max Streicher GmbH & Co. KG aA, Chair of the Supervisory Board
- Aebi Schmidt Holding (ASH), Member of the board of directors
- Gothaer Versicherungsbank, Member of the Advisory Board
- CNC Communications & Network Consulting, Member of the Board of Experts
- Deutsche Gesellschaft für Internationale Zusammenarbeit (GIZ), Member of the Supervisory Board (2018–2022)
- Münchener Hypothekenbank, Member of the Supervisory Board (2014–2019)
- KfW, ex-officio Member of the Board of Supervisory Directors (2009–2013)
- German Energy Agency (DENA), Member of the Supervisory Board (2009–2012)
- Odewald & Companie, Member of the Advisory Board (2005–2009)
- SKW Stahl-Metallurgie Holding, Member of the Advisory Board (2002–2006)

=== Non-profit organisations ===
- Arab-German Chamber of Commerce and Industry (Ghorfa), President (since 2014)
- Hanns Seidel Foundation, Member
- Quadriga, Member of the Board of Trustees (−2011)
- Ifo Institute for Economic Research, Member of the Board of Trustees (2002–2010)
- German Council on Foreign Relations (DGAP), Member of the Presidium (2005–2009)
- German-Korean Society, Vice-President (1998–2002)
