= Rosenheim University of Applied Sciences =

Rosenheim Technical University of Applied Sciences
- Technische Hochschule Rosenheim
- Type: Public
- Established: 1 August 1971
- President: Heinrich Köster
- Academic staff: 175 WS 2020/21
- Administrative staff: 568, including 251 scientific and artistic staff WS 2020/21
- Students: 6.400 WS 2020/21
- Location: Hochschulstraße 1, Rosenheim, Bavaria, 83024, Germany; 47°52′1.59″N 12°6′26.47″E
- Website: www.th-rosenheim.de

The Rosenheim Technical University of Applied Sciences or TH Rosenheim (from German Technische Hochschule Rosenheim) is a university in Rosenheim, Germany with its main campus in Rosenheim and campuses in Mühldorf am Inn, Burghausen and Chiemgau. The TH Rosenheim is an hour's drive away from the Bavarian capital Munich and the Austrian city of Salzburg. The university's key areas of expertise are business, technology, design, healthcare and social studies. Established in 1971 the university is best known for its Faculty of Wood Engineering and Construction.

== Overview ==
Rosenheim Technical University of Applied Sciences currently offers more than 40 Bachelor's and master's degree courses at four branches. Around 6000 students were enrolled in the 2018/19 winter semester, and more than thousand students successfully completed their studies at the TH Rosenheim in the 2018 examination year.

== History ==
In 1925, regional entrepreneurs, including Rosenheim sawmill owner Hugo Laue (1869–1956), founded the private Holztechnikum. The Holztechnikum was first housed at the Max-Josephs-Square in the city centre of Rosenheim. At the beginning, in May 1925, the school had 22 students, the evening courses for masters and assistants were attended by twelve people. In 1943 this private technical school was nationalized.

In the 1950s the expansion of the Holztechnikum began, a wood economics course and a sawmill technology course were introduced. In addition, the technical school was renamed "Staatliches Holztechnikum Rosenheim - Staatliche Ingenieurschule".

From 1953, a six-semester engineering course in the field of wood was offered.

And in 1958, practice and test facilities were built at the site of today's university.

The latter moved to its present location on Marienbergerstraße in 1970 and was upgraded to Rosenheim University of Applied Sciences in 1971 when the Bavarian Law on Universities of Applied Sciences (Fachhochschulgesetz), came into force. The Rosenheim University of Applied Sciences started with the departments of General Sciences, Business Administration, Wood Technology and Plastics Technology.

Since 2014, the university has had an additional branch to the Rosenheim one with the Campus Mühldorf am Inn. In 2016, the university further expanded to the Campus Burghausen.

At the start of the 2018/2019 winter semester, the last change of the name to Rosenheim Technical University of Applied Sciences took place. The university still has the status of a university of applied sciences.

The Chiemgau Campus in Traunstein opened for the 2019/20 winter semester and is the latest addition to the campus.

== University presidents ==
- 1965 - 1972: Josef Gefahrt
- 1972 - 1986: Josef Meister
- 1986 - 2002: Hans Zang
- 2002 - 2009: Alfred Leidig
- since 2009: Heinrich Köster

== Degree Programmes ==
Programme	Degree	ECTS	Language	Campus
Bauingenieurwesen	B.Eng.	210	German	Rosenheim
Chemieingenieurwesen	B.Eng.	210	German	Burghausen
Elektro- und Informationstechnik	B.Eng.	210	German	Rosenheim
Energie- und Gebäudetechnologie	B.Eng.	210	German	Rosenheim
Energietechnik und Erneuerbare Energien	B.Eng.	210	German	Rosenheim
Gebäudetechnik und Energieeffizienz	B.Eng.	210	German	Rosenheim
Holzbau und Ausbau	B.Eng.	210	German	Rosenheim
Holztechnik	B.Eng.	210	German	Rosenheim
Igenieurpädagogik	B.Eng.	210	German	Rosenheim
Innenausbau	B.Eng.	210	German	Rosenheim
International Bachelor of Engineering	B.Eng.	240	German, English	Rosenheim
International Bachelor of Wood Technology	B.Eng.	240	German, English	Rosenheim
Maschinenbau	B.Eng.	210	German	Rosenheim
Maschinenbau, part-time (Schwerpunkt Konstruktion & Entwicklung bzw. Digitalisierung)	B.Eng.	210	German	Mühldorf, Chiemgau (Traunstein)
Materials Engineering	B.Eng.	210	German	Rosenheim
Mechatronik	B.Eng.	210	German	Rosenheim
Medizintechnik	B.Eng.	210	German	Rosenheim
Nachhaltige Polymertechnik	B.Eng.	210	German	Rosenheim
Plastics Engineering (Kunststofftechnik)	B.Eng.	210	German	Rosenheim
Prozessautomatisierungstechnik	B.Eng.	210	German	Burghausen
Umwelttechnologie	B.Eng.	210	German	Burghausen
Wirtschaftsingeineurwesen	B.Eng.	210	German, English	Rosenheim
Angewandte Psychologie	B.Sc.	210	German	Mühldorf am Inn
Applied Artificial Intelligence	B.Sc.	210	English	Rosenheim
Data Analytics & Statistical Learning	B.Sc.	210	German	Rosenheim
Immobilien- und Facility Management	B.Sc.	210	German	Rosenheim
Informatik	B.Sc.	210	German	Rosenheim
Management in der Gesundheitswirtschaft	B.Sc.	210	German	Rosenheim
Pflegewissenschaft	B.Sc.	210	German	Rosenheim
Physiotherapie	B.Sc.	210	German	Rosenheim
Smart Interactive Media	B.Sc.	210	English	Chiemgau (Ruhpolding), Chiemgau (Traunstein)
Gesundheitsmanagement (until September 2026: Unternehmensführung für Gesundheitsberufe, part-time)	B.Sc.	210	German	Rosenheim
Wirtschaftsinformatik	B.Sc.	210	German	Rosenheim
Wirtschaftsmathematik-Aktuarwissenschaften	B.Sc.	210	German	Rosenheim
Architektur	B.A.	240	German, English	Rosenheim
Betriebswirtschaft	B.A.	210	German, English	Rosenheim
Betriebswirtschaft	B.A.	210	German	Burghausen
Innenarchitektur	B.A.	240	German	Rosenheim
E-Commerce	B.A.	210	English	Chiemgau (Traunstein)
Betriebswirtschaft und Management, part-time	B.A.	210	German	Rosenheim
Pädagogik der Kindheit, part-time	B.A.	210	German	Mühldorf
Soziale Arbeit	B.A.	210	German	Mühldorf
Advanced Industrial Engineering	M.Sc.	90	English	Rosenheim
Angewandte Forschung und Entwicklung in den Ingenieurwissenschaften	M.Sc.	90	German, English	Burghausen, Rosenheim
Circular Economy, part-time	M.Sc.	90	German, English	Burghausen
Informatik	M.Sc.	90	German	Rosenheim
Hydrogen Technology	M.Sc.	90	English	Burghausen
Holztechnik	M.Sc.	90	English	Rosenheim
Nachhaltigkeit im Bauwesen, part-time	M.Sc.	90	German	Rosenheim
Versorgungsforschung und -management	M.Sc.	90	German	Rosenheim
Bauingenieurwesen	M.Eng.	90	German	Rosenheim
Fenster & Fassade, part-time	M.Eng.	90	German	Rosenheim
Gebäudephysik (joint degree with the Stuttgart Technical University of Applied Sciences)	M.Eng.	90	German, English	Rosenheim, Stuttgart
Holzbau und Energieeffizienz, part-time	M.Eng.	90	German	Rosenheim
Ingenieurwissenschaften	M.Eng.	90	English	Rosenheim
Wirtschaftsingenieurwesen	M.Eng.	90	German	Rosenheim
Innenarchitektur und Möbeldesign	M.A.	90	German	Rosenheim
International Management	M.A.	90	German, English	Rosenheim
Management und Führungskompetenz, part-time	MBA	90	German, English	Rosenheim
Wirtschaftsingenieurwesen, part-time	MBA&E	90	German	Rosenheim

== Notable alumni and professors ==
=== Alumni ===
- Marc-André Houmard (1928–2014), Swiss politician (FDP)
- Ralf Speth (born 1955), senior industry executive
- Bärbel Kofler (born 1967), politician (SPD)
- Gerda Stauner (born 1973), author
- Jochen Wirtz (born 1962), Professor of Marketing, Vice Dean MBA Programs

== Facilities ==
=== RO-BERTA ===
The RO-BERTA project (Rosenheims meteorologische Besonderheiten: Eine Regelungs- Technische Aufgabe, Rosenheim's meteorological features: A control task) was launched in 2010 with the aim of supporting anti-hail pilots in selecting the vaccination area and setting up a database for basic research on large-scale weather conditions during hailstorms.

=== roteg ===
The construction of the Rosenheim Technology Centre Energy & Buildings (Rosenheimer Technologiezentrum Energie & Gebäude, roteg) began in July 2016. 800 square metres of state-of-the-art laboratories (ventilation and air-conditioning technology and systems, sound measurement technology, energy and material flow management, solar technology, networks and energy storage systems, sustainable heat generation systems and energy monitoring as well as transparent building envelopes and in situ measurements) are available for the benefit of all engineering and energy and building technology courses at TH Rosenheim. The technology centre also cooperates with companies and is involved in various research projects.

=== wiko ===
The Wirtschaftskolloquium Oberbayern (Business Colloquium Upper Bavaria, wiko) sees itself as a network of regional business associations and federations. The aim is to form a common voice on economic topics in Southeast Upper Bavaria in order to create promising framework conditions for sustainable economic activities and entrepreneurships, to promote economic rationality and to strengthen communication between its members.

Wiko's patron is Dr. Marcel Huber, member of the Landtag of Bavaria. Once a year wiko invites to a highlight event. So far, Manfred Bischoff (2015), Rudolf Staudigl (2016), Wolfgang Clement (2017) and Theo Waigel (2018) have lectured on current economic, political and social topics.

=== ezro ===
Founded in 2012, Energiezukunft Rosenheim (Energy Future Rosenheim, ezro) is an association of the city and the district of Rosenheim, the Rosenheim Technical University of Applied Sciences and public, private and commercial stakeholders. The initiative is active in the fields of agriculture, municipalities, e-mobility, energy and citizens' initiatives, buildings and trade. Ezro annually awards the Energy Future Prize for innovative renovation or new construction measures in the regional private housing sector.

=== Library ===
There are libraries in all three branches of the TH Rosenheim, the largest one is located at the Rosenheim campus. The library there is open to the public. The offer is oriented to university-relevant topics and includes: books, e-books, e-journals, print media, specialist databases and standards.

Guided tours and literature research training courses expand the library's range of services. Numerous workplaces create a concentrated learning atmosphere. Lockers are available too.

=== Family office ===
The university has a family office. This office provides assistance in studying, studying with a child, caring for relatives and with the topic of career and family.

=== University Sports ===
For the students and employees of TH Rosenheim there is an extensive range of sports, which is newly compiled each semester, Currently the university offers courses in over 30 different disciplines and sports. TH Rosenheim itself also participates in championships and tournaments with its own teams. For example, the men's football team took second place in the Bavarian University Cup 2019. At the Bavarian Winter University Championships 2019, the staff took first place in the Alpine Skiing category and 2nd place in the Shooting category.

=== Cafeteria ===
In the main building of TH Rosenheim Studentenwerk München runs the so-called Stu Bistro. In summer the cozy cafeteria garden is also open. In addition to breakfast and lunch menus, there is a salad bar, fruit and snacks, sweets and drinks. At the espresso bar in the cafeteria you can get coffee and other drinks as well as snacks. There are also several snack and drink machines on the campus. Payment is cashless with the Student Card.

=== Rosenheim Observatory ===
The observatory at the TH Rosenheim was built in the 1980s and 1990s by Prof. Aribert Nieswandt. The observatory was and is used also for the education of the students. In addition, there are regular public guided tours and lectures.

=== Awards ===
A team from the university took second place at the Solar Decathlon Europe 2010 in Madrid. For this, the students developed an energy self-sufficient residential building. As part of the Excellence Initiative 2012, the Rosenheim University of Applied Sciences was honoured as a partner of the Technical University of Munich for its pioneering cooperation in the fields of wood technology, timber construction and energy efficiency. In 2014, the Technical University of Rosenheim won the European Satellite Navigation Competition (ESNC) with RO-BERTA, the largest international ideas competition in the field of satellite navigation. The university prevailed against more than 50 universities and institutions worldwide.

== See also ==
- Education in Germany
- List of universities in Germany
- List of forestry universities and colleges
