= Lukas Beck =

Austrian photographer

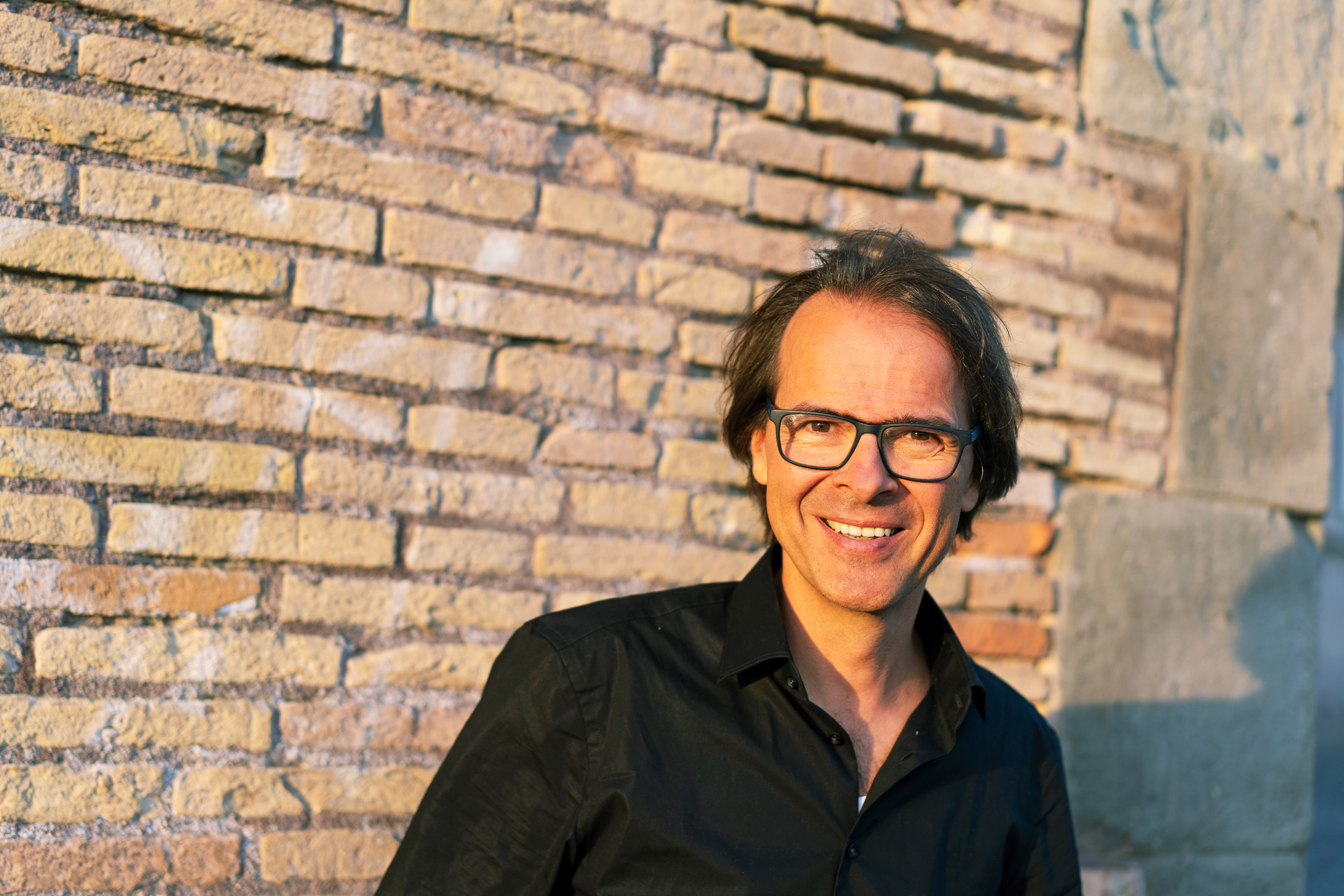
Lukas Beck

Lukas Beck is an Austrian photographer who specialises in music and theatre.

== Life and work ==
He has contributed to virtually all Austrian newspapers and magazines, as well as international papers, such as Die Zeit or The New York Times.

Beck was born in 1967, and educated at the University of Vienna, where he read ethnology. His pictures, in a style all of their own, show a keen eye for detail, colour and light. His work has been shown in Vienna's Leopold Museum, the Westlicht Gallery and the Palais Coburg. Beck has published photo books on various subjects, and has created CD covers and posters. His work has had a deep impact on Austrian photography.

Beck's main focus is man and human nature. His often stunning colour portraits reveal a deep compassion and fondness for his subjects. He has portrayed, among others, the musicians Willi Resetarits and Hans Söllner, actors Dennis Hopper and Christopher Lee, singers Elina Garanca and Edita Gruberova, crime novelist Wolf Haas and a number of Austrian and international high-profile politicians, such as Mohamed ElBaradei.

In 1999, Beck was hired by the Vienna Boys' Choir to help change the choir's image; his unusual photos show the boys as living, breathing youngsters and display an unbridled sense of fun. In 2004, Beck published a photo book on the famous Austrian choir. Since 2003, he has been teaching photography at the ORF (=Austrian National Radio) summer academy.

In 2024, he launched the project ‘ONE HOUR WITH’, in which he photographs artists for an hour without speaking to them.

== Books ==
- Beck (1993), Ostbahnkurti und die "Chefpartie", Edition Tau
- Beck (2002), Räume in Bewegung, Springer Wien New York
- Beck (2003), Luxus Shopping Guide – Vienna, EchoVerlag Wien
- Beck (2004), Kurt Ostbahn und die Combo, NP Verlag St. Pölten
- Beck (2004), Wiener Sängerknaben, NP Verlag St. Pölten
- Beck (2004), Wien, Tradition und Moderne, Schmid Verlag Wien
- Beck (2006), Hans Söllner – Bilderbuch, Trikont München
- Beck (2008), Revanche 2008 Substance Media Wien
- Beck (2010), Ausgezeichnetes Wien in 50 Portraits, Ueberreuter Verlag
- Beck (2011), Leben im Zoo, Echomedia
- Beck (2012), liebe grenzenlos, echomedia, 2012 />
- Beck (2012), Filmgespraeche, Synema
- Beck (2015), Stadtmenschen, Picus
- Beck (2015), Das soziale Gesicht Europas, Falter Verlag
- Beck (2020), Wien pur, Echomedia
- Beck (2021), WienBlick x2 - Mit Handy & Hasselblad, Echomedia

== Movies ==
- 2008: Be A Mensch, ORF
- 2008: MoZuluArt, Universal
- 2010: Faltenradio live, Hoanzl
- 2013: Schönbrunner Tiergeschichten - Leben im Zoo, Universum Doku, ORF
- 2015: Mehrstimmig - Die Wiener Sängerknaben, Doku, ORF
- 2016: Still, Doku, ORF

== Solo exhibitions ==
- 1993: OstbahnKurti und die Chefpartie, Vindobona Wien
- 1995: AugenBlick, Donaufestival Krems
- 2002: Gehört gesehen Westlicht Wien
- 2004: Wiener Sängerknaben, Palais Coburg Wien
- 2004: Wien, Tradition und Moderne, Leopold Museum Wien
- 2008: Fußballkäfig international, Galerie Urbanart Wien
- 2015: "Protest", WAK Wien
- 2018: "Beckstage", Theater am Spittelberg Wien
- 2018: "Sie sollen nicht sagen können, sie hätten von nichts gewußt", Rotor Graz
- 2018: "Best of Lukas Beck", Messe Congress Wien
- 2021: "Wien pur", Galerie Lukas Feichtner

== Awards ==
- 2003: Österreichischer Zeitschriftenpreis
- 2009: Lichtfarben 2009. Österreichischer Preis für interkulturelle Pressefotografie
- 2013: Matsalu Nature Film Festival, Special Prizes of the Tallinn Zoo
- 2014: International Independent Film Awards, Gold Award for Cinematography
- 2018: Goldene Gesellschaftsmedaille der Photographischen Gesellschaft
