= Christopher Lovelock =

British service marketing scholar

Christopher Lovelock (12 July 1940 – 24 February 2008) was a British academic, author, and consultant known for his contributions to the field of Services Marketing. He was born in Saltash, Cornwall, the United Kingdom. Lovelock was also known for his excellent case studies.

Christopher Lovelock earned a Ph.D. from Stanford University, where his dissertation examined the marketing of public transportation. He had previously received an MBA from Harvard University after moving to the US in 1967. Lovelock had also obtained a Master of Arts in Economics and a Bachelor of Arts in Communications from the University of Edinburgh, during which time he appeared on the first series of University Challenge.

Lovelock embarked on his academic career serving, most significantly, on the faculty of the Harvard Business School (USA) for 11 years in addition to other academic appointments at distinguished institutions including the University of California Berkeley (USA), Stanford University (USA) and the MIT Sloan School of Management (USA). Lovelock’s other visiting appointments include those at IMD (Switzerland), INSEAD (France), and the University of Queensland (Australia). In total, Lovelock had taught in over 30 countries on every continent except Antarctica. Besides his teaching appointments, Christopher Lovelock was also an author or co-author of numerous books, articles, and teaching cases. Lovelock’s last academic publication, "Services Marketing: People, Technology, Strategy 6th edition," co-authored together with Jochen Wirtz, has been translated into ten languages. Other books include "Product Plus", "Marketing Challenges" and "Public and Nonprofit Marketing" (the latter two co-authored with Charles Weinberg).

Lovelock’s 60-odd articles were also internationally acclaimed. His paper, "Whither Services Marketing? In Search of a New Paradigm and Fresh Perspectives" co-written with Evert Gummesson won the Best Services Article Award in the American Marketing Association and was a finalist for the IBM award for the best article in the Journal of Service Research. For that and other recognitions, Christopher Lovelock was honored with the prestigious American Marketing Association’s Award for Career Contributions in the Services Discipline.

The 100 or more teaching cases he wrote were also much heralded. Twice, he won top honors in the BusinessWeek "European Case of The Year" awards. Famous series include Southwest Airlines and FedEx. The latter, written in the 1970s, gained FedEx wide exposure to potential clients, indirectly contributing to FedEx’s success today. His teaching cases, revered for their acute insights into marketing challenges, retain their positions on bestsellers’ lists more than a quarter of a century after they were published, displaying a strong relevance even in today’s context. Moving to Eastham, Cape Cod, in 1990, Christopher Lovelock became actively involved with his adopted community. Lending his expertise in areas like education, health care, environmental conservation, and regional transportation, he became an advocate for a variety of issues such as summer traffic to underground utility lines. Most of these can be traced back to pieces found in the Cape Cod Times for which he was an Op-Ed or his advisory position for various local organizations.

== Awards ==
Year	Award	Work	Notes
1984	Alpha Kappa Psi Award	"Classifying Services to Gain Strategic Marketing Insights."	
1993	ECCH European Case of the Year Award	"Federal Express: Quality Improvement Program."	
1995	American Marketing Association Award	"Career Contributions to the Services Discipline."	
1995	ECCH European Case of the Year Award	"Singapore Airlines: Using Technology for Service Excellence."	Shared with Sandra Vandermerwe
1997	European Foundation for Management Development Award	"First Direct: Branchless Banking."	Shared with Jean-Claude Larréché
2000	Business Week / ECCH European Case of the Year Award	"First Direct: Branchless Banking."	Shared with Jean-Claude Larréché
