= Gerd Rasp =

German physician

- Born: 5 October 1960 (age 65); Bad Reichenhall, Germany
- Known for: rhinology and tympanic surgery
- Scientific career
- Fields: otorhinolaryngology
- Workplaces: Paracelsus Private Medical University of Salzburg

Gerd Rasp (* born 10 May 1960, Bad Reichenhall) is a German physician of otorhinolaryngology with the additional specialties of plastic surgery and allergology. He is a professor and chairman of the hospital for otorhinolaryngology and dean for research affairs at the Paracelsus Private Medical University of Salzburg, Austria . He is known for his work in the fields of rhinology and tympanic surgery.

== Scientific contribution ==
At first Rasp undertook experimental work with the active sequencing of the ovinal inter-alpha trypsin inhibitor. Later he focussed on subjects in allergology and rhinology. A focal point was the analysis of local nasal fluid and tissue, mainly regarding inflammation mechanisms, producing the majority of his scientific publications. More, common papers came from work with his team. Rasp's habilitation addressed inflammation parameters of local medical diagnosis of the immune system for the dried nasal mucus. In the context of clinical activities in Munich and Stuttgart Rasp took part in a research network for paraglioms under Hartmut Neumann, Freiburg. In Salzburg Rasp expanded the neuro-otological work group.

== Academic memberships ==
- Verband der Leitenden Krankenhausärzte Österreichs (VLKÖ)
- Österreichische Gesellschaft für Hals-Nasen-Ohrenheilkunde
- Deutsche Gesellschaft für Hals-Nasen-Ohrenheilkunde
- European Academy of Facial Plastic surgery (EAFPS)
- European Academy of Allergy and Clinical Immunology (EAACI)
- Deutsche Gesellschaft für Schädelbasischirurgie
- German Society for Plastic And Reconstructive Surgery (DGPW)

Rasp is or was a member in the advisory board or in the editor committee of the following scientific journals:

- 2012 Laryngo-Rhino-Otologie (coeditor)
- 2012 Laryngoscope (editorial board)

== Awards ==
1996 Editor's choice award of LOOK SMART for the first website in the German otorhinolaryngology

== Publications ==
PubFacts

ResearchGate
