= Matthias Engelsberger =

German politician (1925–2005)

Member of the Bundestag; for Traunstein
- In office 20 October 1969 – 20 December 1990
- Preceded by: Heinz Brenck
- Succeeded by: Peter Ramsauer

Personal details
- Born: 18 July 1925 Siegsdorf, Germany
- Died: 30 October 2005 (aged 80)

Matthias Engelsberger (18 July 1925 – 20 October 2005) was a German politician representative of the Christian Social Union in Bavaria (CSU). Between 1969 and 1990, he was a member of the Bundestag of Germany. Prior to this, he began his political career in Siegsdorf.

Together with Wolfgang Daniels he advocated for the passing of the Stromeinspeisungsgesetz (English: Electricity Feed-In Act), which the Bundestag did in October 1990. In 1988 he was awarded with the Grand Decoration of Honour in Gold for Services to the Republic of Austria.

In 2010, his daughter Elisabeth Engelsberger-Hinke (CSU) called for Sebastian Frankenberger to be awarded the Bavarian Order of Merit for his successful initiative For genuine protection against smoking!" in Bavaria.

== See also ==
- List of Bavarian Christian Social Union politicians
