= Siegfried Walch =

German politician (born 1984)

Siegfried Walch MdB
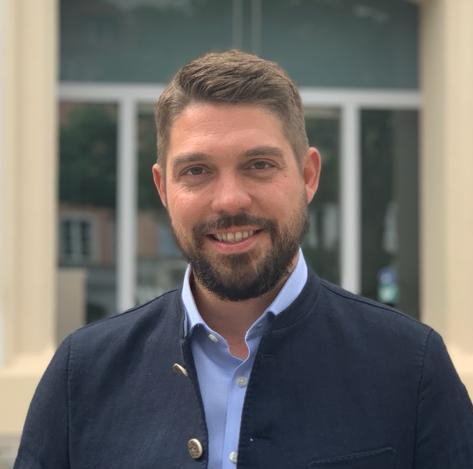
- Walch in 2021

Member of the Bundestag; for Traunstein
- Incumbent
- Assumed office 25 March 2025
- Preceded by: Peter Ramsauer

Personal details
- Born: 8 April 1984 (age 42) Bad Reichenhall, West Germany
- Party: Christian Social Union

Siegfried Sebastian Walch (born 8 April 1984) is a German politician who was elected as a member of the Bundestag in 2025. He has served as district administrator of Traunstein since 2014.
