= Bad Reichenhall =

Place in Bavaria, Germany

- Town
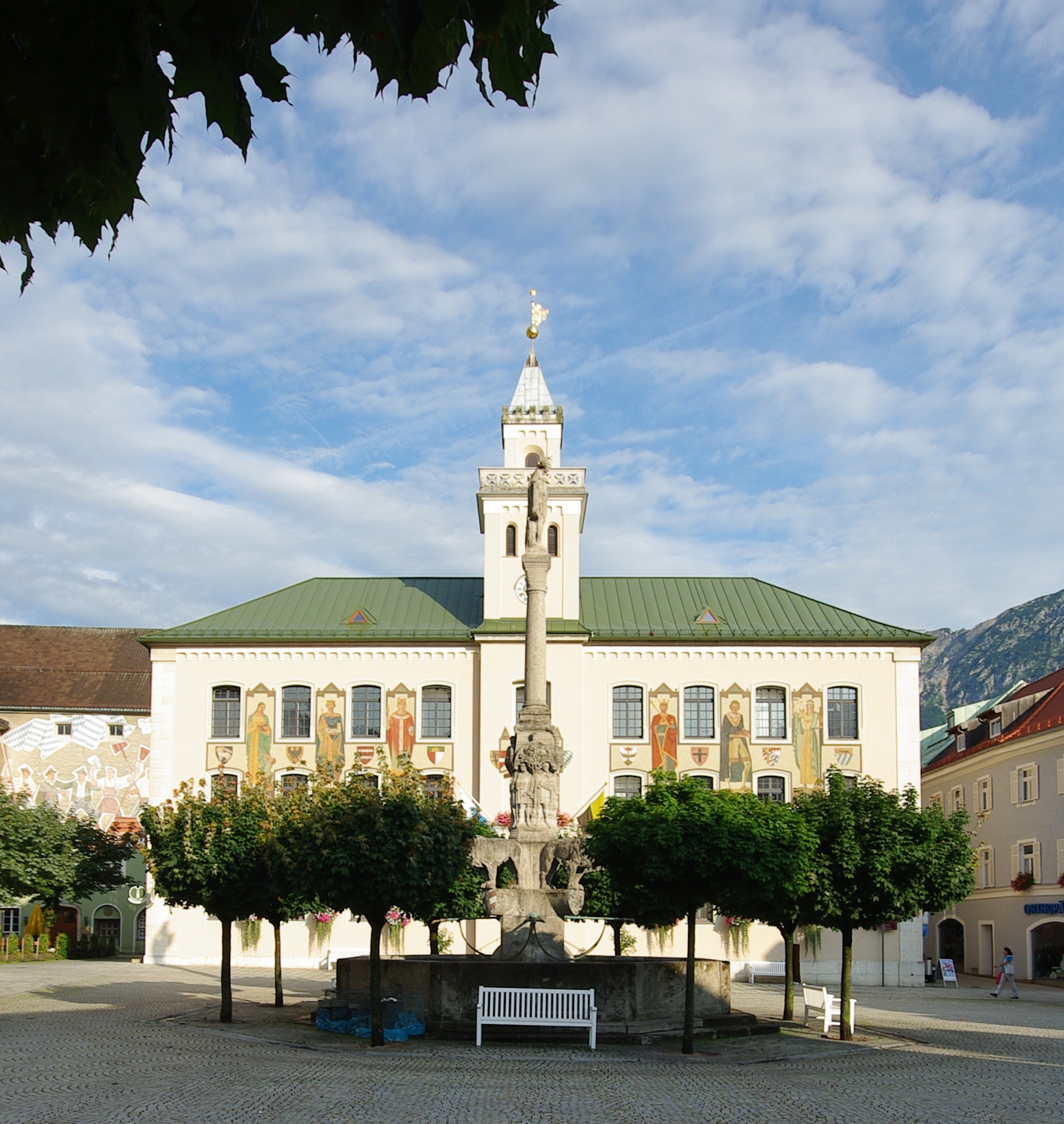
- Town hall

- Coat of arms

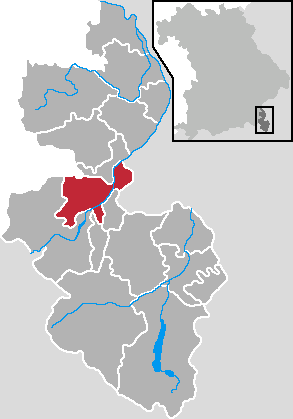
- Location of Bad Reichenhall within Berchtesgadener Land district
- Interactive map of Bad Reichenhall
- Location within Germany Location within Bavaria
- Coordinates: 47°43′29″N 12°52′37″E
- Country: Germany
- State: Bavaria
- Admin. region: Upper Bavaria
- District: Berchtesgadener Land

Government
  - Mayor (2020–26): Christoph Lung (CSU)

Area
  - Total: 41.92 km^{2} (16.19 sq mi)
- Elevation: 473 m (1,552 ft)

Population (2025-12-31)
  - Total: 18,284
  - Density: 436.2/km^{2} (1,130/sq mi)
- Time zone: UTC+01:00 (CET)
  - Summer (DST): UTC+02:00 (CEST)
- Postal codes: 83435
- Dialling codes: 08651
- Vehicle registration: BGL (until 1979: REI)
- Website: www.stadt-bad-reichenhall.de

Bad Reichenhall (German pronunciation: [baːt ʁaɪçn̩ˈhal]; Central Bavarian: Reichahoi) is a spa town, and administrative center of the Berchtesgadener Land district in Upper Bavaria, Germany. It is located near Salzburg in a basin encircled by the Chiemgau Alps (including Mount Staufen (1,771 m) and Mount Zwiesel (1,781 m)). Together with other alpine towns, Bad Reichenhall engages in the Alpine Town of the Year Association for the implementation of the Alpine Convention to achieve sustainable development in the Alpine Arc. Bad Reichenhall was awarded Alpine Town of the Year in 2001.

Bad Reichenhall is a traditional center of salt production, obtained by evaporating water saturated with salt from brine ponds.

== History ==
The earliest known inhabitants of the area were tribes of the Glockenbecher-Culture (a Bronze Age Culture, from about 2000 B.C.) In the age of the La Tene culture (about 450 B.C.), organised salt production commenced utilising the local brine pools. In the same period, a Celtic place of worship is placed at the "Langacker". From 15 B.C to 480 A.D, the city was part of a Roman province, Noricum. 1136 A.D bought the founding of a monastery St. Zeno.

In 1617–1619, a wooden pipeline for brine exportation to Traunstein was built, with a length of 31 km, and more than 200 m in altitude difference.

In 1834, two-thirds of the city's buildings were destroyed by a major fire. The early 19th century saw the beginning of tourism, with Reichenhall becoming a famous health resort. From 1890, Reichenhall became known as "Bad Reichenhall". In 1928, the Predigtstuhl Cable Car was opened, an aerial tramway connecting Bad Reichenhall with the Predigtstuhl mountain top.

During World War II, the area was bombed by Allied forces, killing 200 people on 25 April 1945. The town centre, with many hospitals and the train station, was nearly destroyed; the barracks did not suffer any damage. After the war, the area was under American military governance (1945–1948). After World War II, the Americans established a Displaced Persons camp in the town, where Holocaust survivors lived for several years before immigrating to other countries. In 1947, David Ben-Gurion visited the DP camp, and saw the artworks created by Samuel Bak, one of the Holocaust survivors living at the camp.

On 1 November 1999, a mass shooting took place when a 16-year-old killed his sister and opened fire from a bedroom window, killing three and wounding several others, among them actor Günter Lamprecht, before committing suicide.

In 2001, Bad Reichenhall was named Alpine Town of the Year and a few years later became a member of Alpine Pearls.

On 2 January 2006, a structural collapse occurred at Bad Reichenhall Ice Rink. Fifteen people, twelve of them children, died in the collapse of the Bad Reichenhall Ice Rink on 2 January 2006. Thirty-four people were injured in the accident.

== Transport ==
The nearest airport is Salzburg Airport, which is located 12 km (7 mi) northeast of the town. The airport provides direct flights to some destinations in other parts of Europe. Munich Airport is the nearest large airport located 150 km (93 mi) north west of Bad Reichenhall, which provides most domestic and international destinations.

== Notable people from Bad Reichenhall ==
- Anni Friesinger-Postma (born 1977), speed skater (born in Bad Reichenhall, lived in Inzell ~10 km away and now lives in Salzburg)
- Johannes Frießner (1892–1971), World War II German Army general
- Lore Frisch, well known actress in the 1940s and 1950s. Moved from Traunstein to Bad Reichenhall in the mid-1930s and got her start in acting in Bad Reichenhall before becoming famous in Munich and Berlin.
- Hermann Gassner Jr (born 1988), rally driver
- Walter Grabmann (1905–1992), World War II Luftwaffe General
- Barbara Gruber, ski mountaineer
- Regina Häusl, alpine skier (born in Bad Reichenhall, started for the Ski-Klub Bad Reichenhall, lives in Schneizlreuth since her birth)
- Andreas Hinterstoisser (1914–1936), mountaineer
- Andreas Hofer (composer), composer (1629–1684)
- Michael Neumayer (born 1979), ski jumper
- Georg Nickaes (born 1971), ski mountaineer
- Franz Oberwinkler (1939–2018), mycologist, expert on Heterobasidiomycetes
- Philipp Öttl (born 1996), World Super Bikes motorcycle racer for Team GoEleven
- Günther Rall (1918–2009), World War II Luftwaffe ace, postwar Luftwaffe general
- Gerd Rasp (born 1960), physician of otorhinolaryngology
- Peter Schreyer (born 1953), car designer
- Hans Söllner (born 1955), singer-songwriter
- Walter F. Tichy (born 1952), computer scientist, initial developer of the RCS revision control system
- Karl Ullrich (1910–1996), SS Oberführer
- Siegfried Walch (born 1984), politician, member of the Bundestag

== Gallery ==
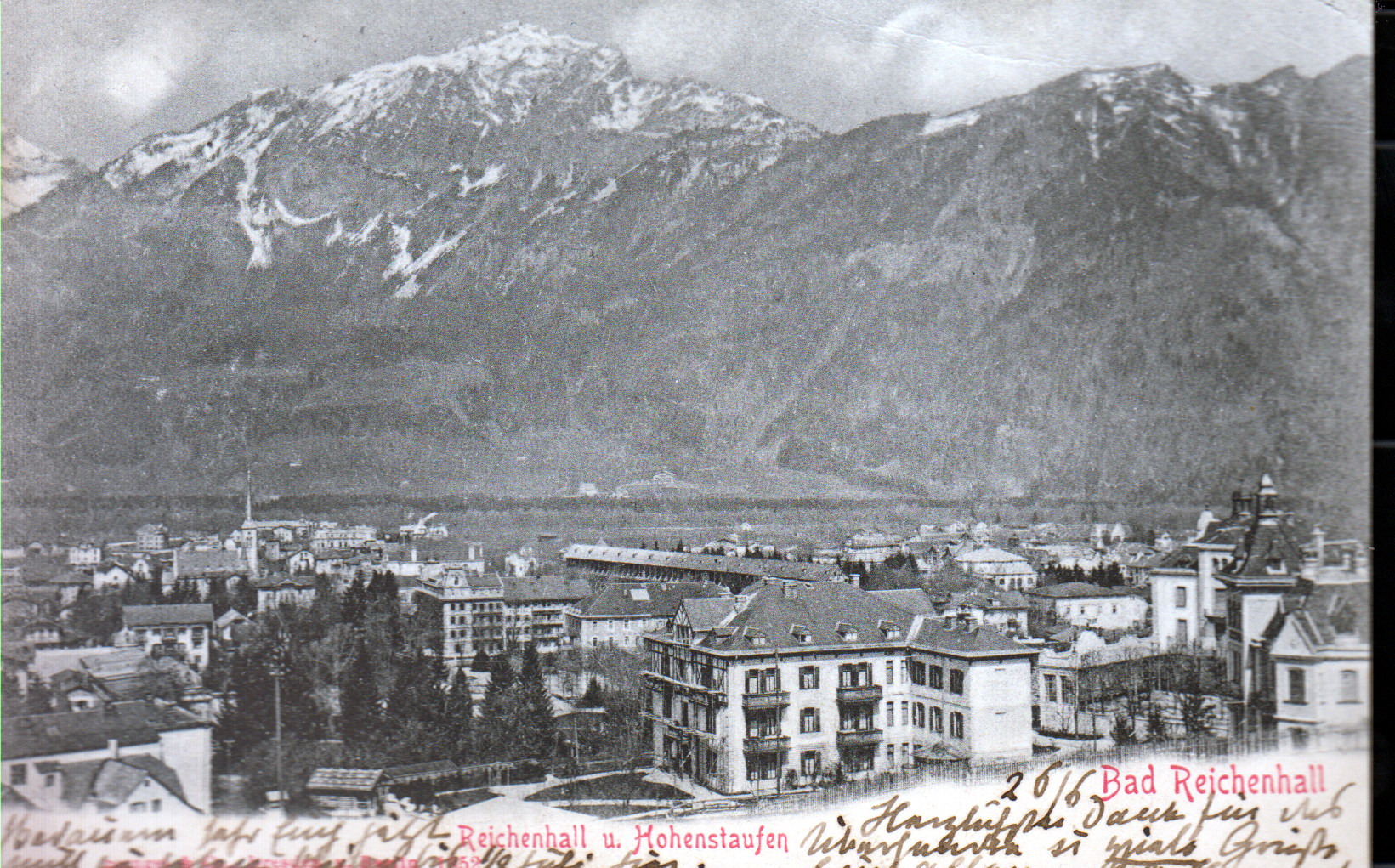
City in 1903

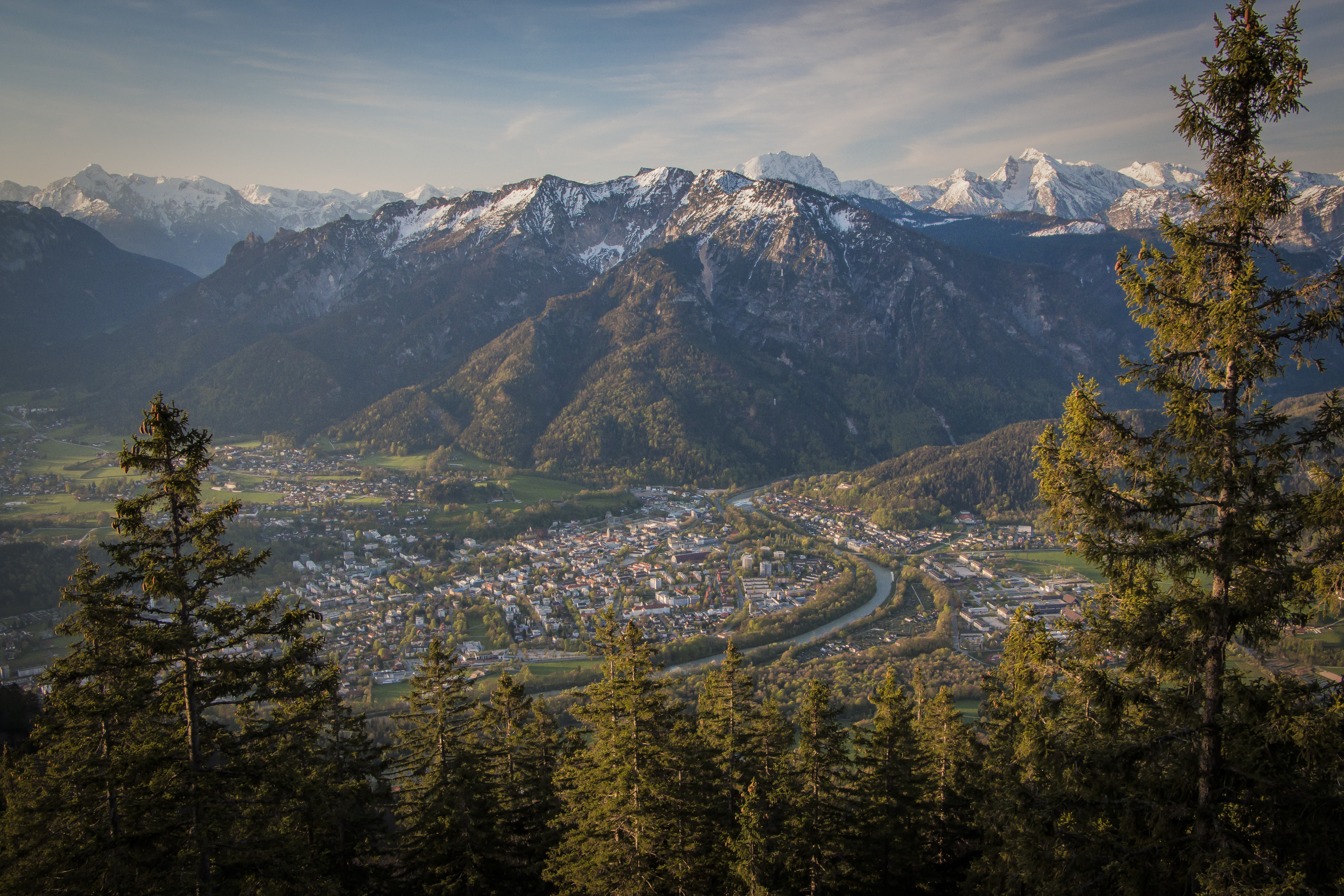
View from above

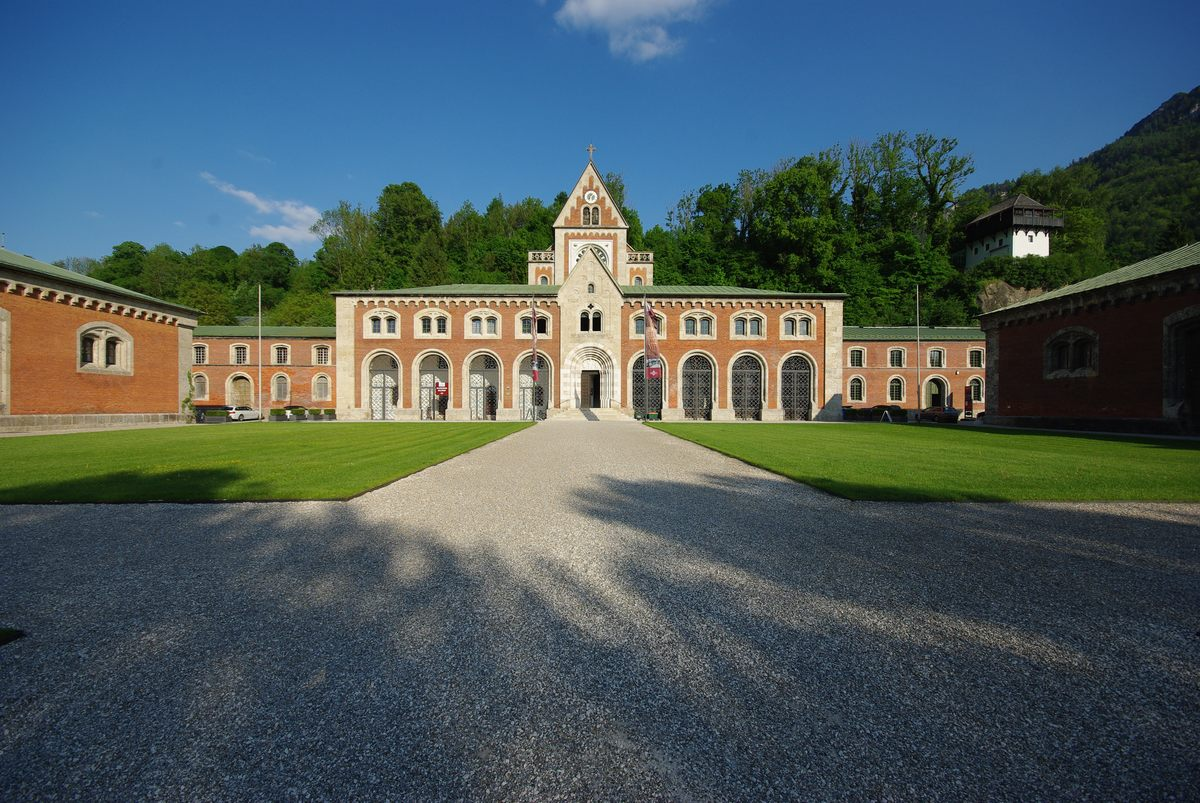
Alte Saline (old saltworks)

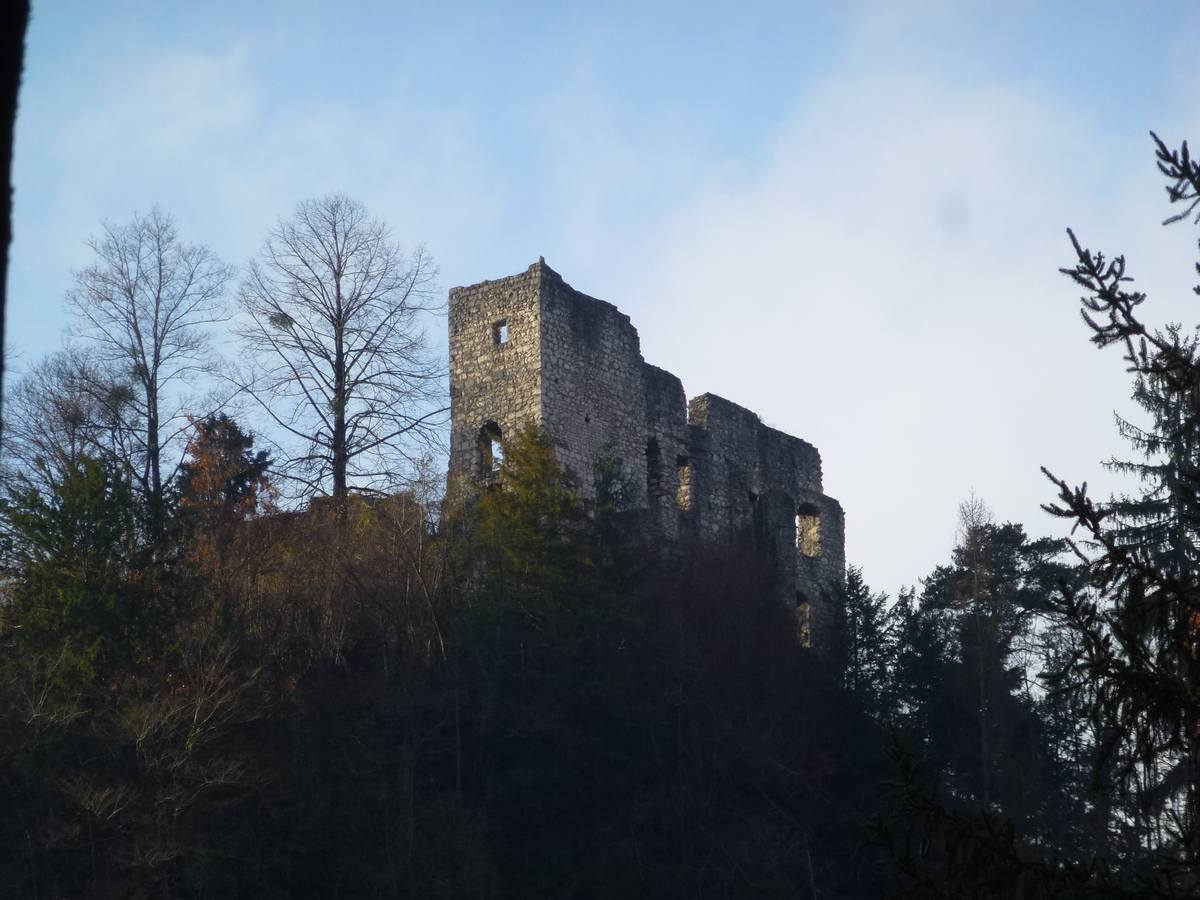
Karlstein castle ruins

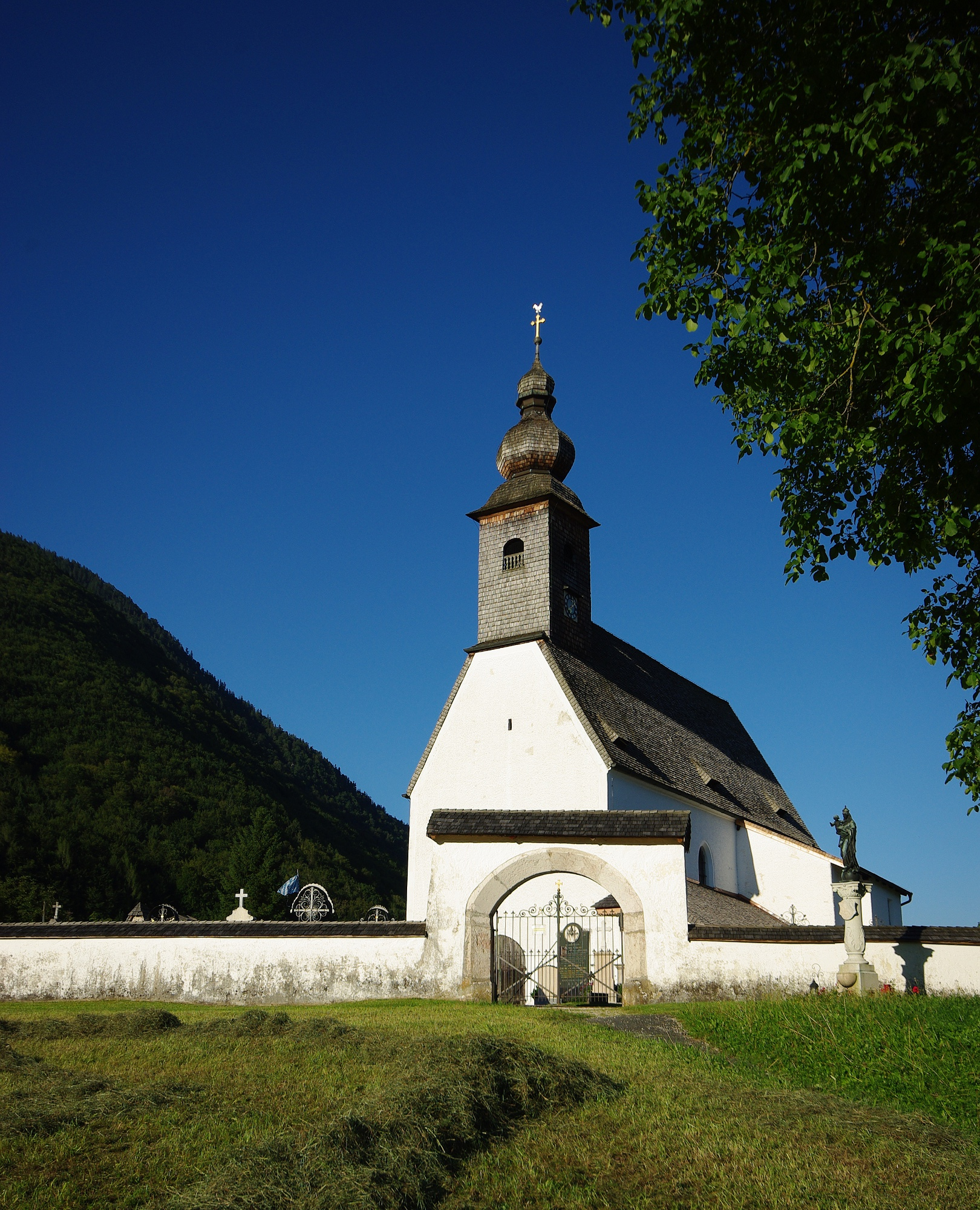
St. George's church

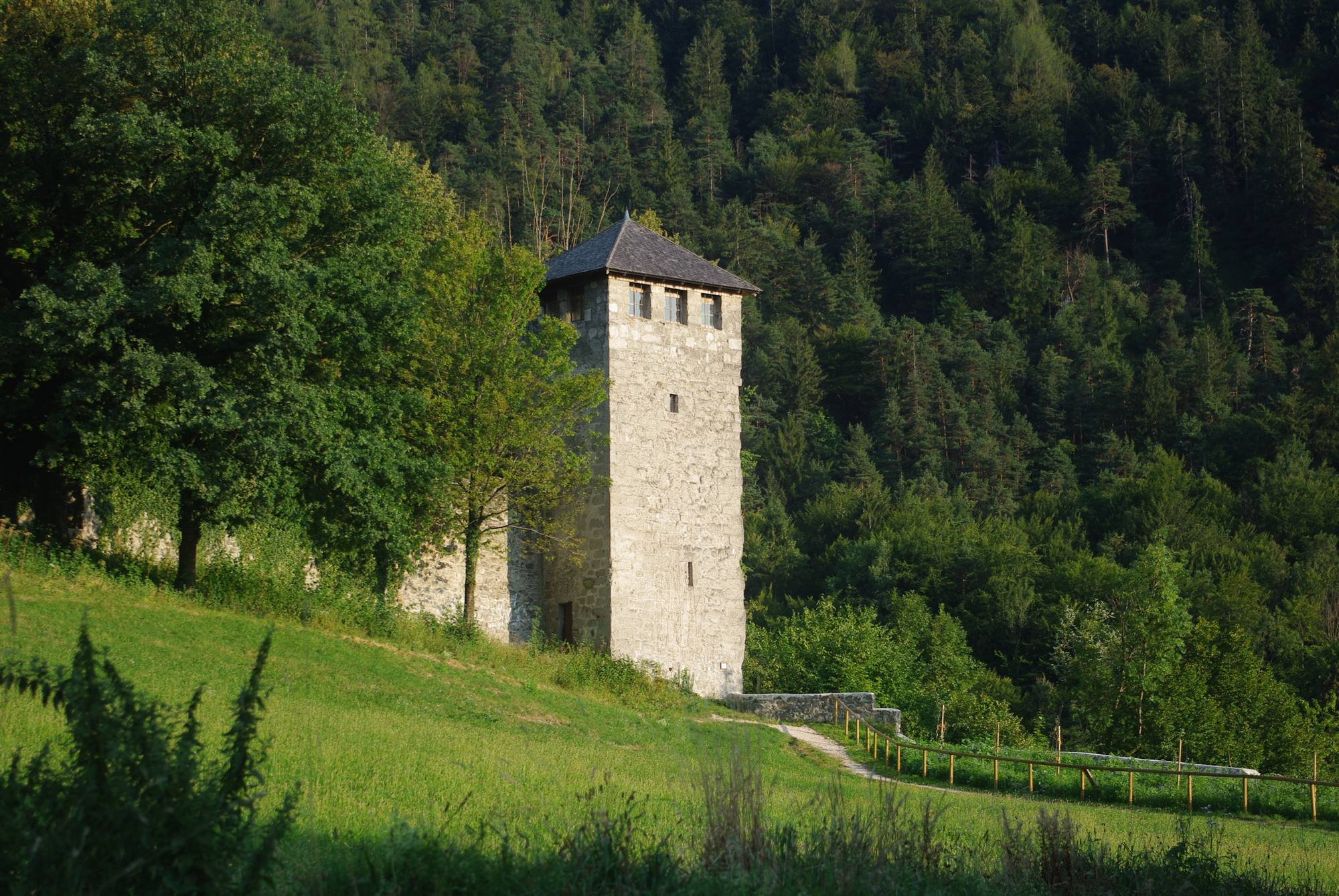
Powder tower

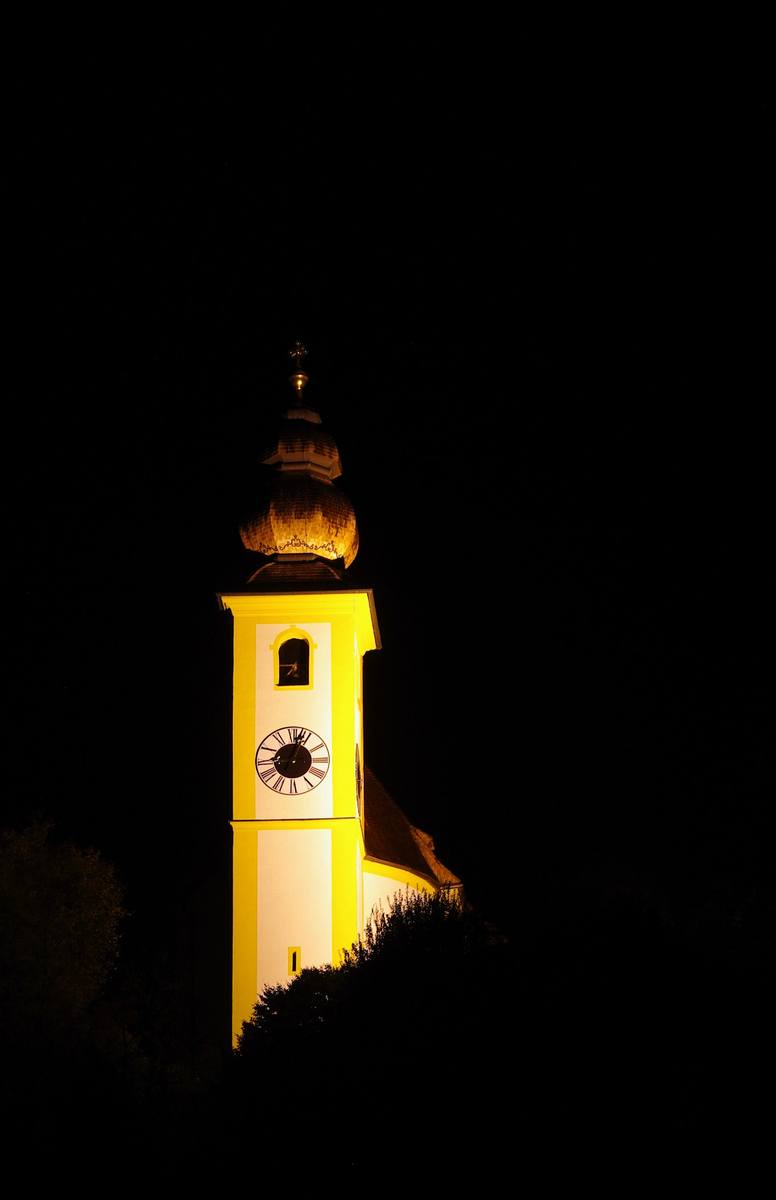
St. Pancras church at night

== See also ==
- Eastern Alps
- Berchtesgadener Land
- Berchtesgaden Alps
- Berchtesgaden
- Jenner
- Hochkönig
