= Bärbel Kofler =

German politician (born 1967)

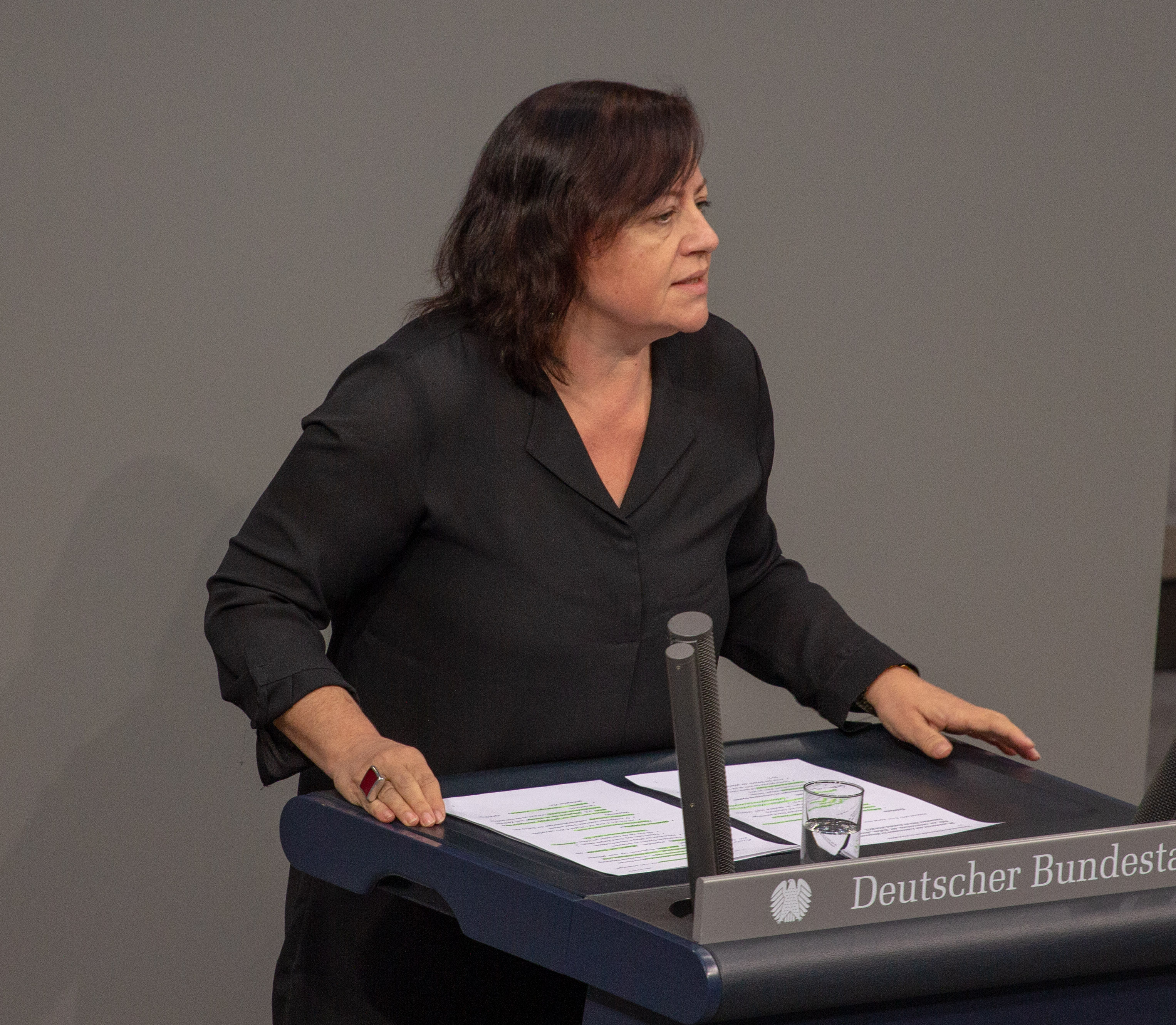
- Kofler in 2019

Federal Commissioner for Human Rights Policy and Humanitarian Assistance
- In office March 2016 – December 2021
- Chancellor: Angela Merkel
- Minister: Frank-Walter Steinmeier; Sigmar Gabriel; Heiko Maas
- Preceded by: Christoph Strässer
- Succeeded by: Luise Amtsberg

Member of the Bundestag
- Incumbent
- Assumed office 2004

Personal details
- Born: 24 May 1967 (age 59) Freilassing, West Germany (now Germany)
- Party: SPD
- Education: Rosenheim University of Applied Sciences; University of Salzburg

Bärbel Kofler (born 24 May 1967) is a German politician of the Social Democratic Party (SPD) who has been a member of the Bundestag from the state of Bavaria since 2004.

In addition to her parliamentary work, Kofler has been serving as Parliamentary State Secretary in the Federal Ministry for Economic Cooperation and Development in the governments of successive Chancellors Olaf Scholz and Friedrich Merz since 2021. From 2016 until 2021, she served as Federal Government Commissioner for Human Rights Policy and Humanitarian Assistance at the Federal Foreign Office in the government of Chancellor Angela Merkel.

== Political career ==
On 21 September 2004 Kofler moved to the Bundestag to replace the late Hans Büttner, representing the Berchtesgadener Land and Traunstein districts.

In parliament, Kofler has been a member of the Committee on Foreign Affairs since 2009. She has also served on the Committee on Economic Cooperation and Development (2005–2016); the Sub-Committee on the United Nations (2006–2009); the Committee on Human Rights and Humanitarian Aid (2004–2005); and the Finance Committee (2004–2005). In addition to her committee assignments, she chaired the German-Ukrainian Parliamentary Friendship Group from 2006 until 2013.

Within the SPD parliamentary group, Kofler belongs to the Parliamentary Left, a left-wing movement.

In the negotiations to form a Grand Coalition of the Christian Democrats (CDU together with the Bavarian CSU) and the SPD under the leadership of Chancellor Angela Merkel following the 2013 elections, Kofler was part of the SPD delegation in the working group on the environment and agriculture, led by Katherina Reiche and Ute Vogt. In similar negotiations following the 2017 federal elections, she was part of the working group on foreign policy, led by Ursula von der Leyen, Gerd Müller and Sigmar Gabriel.

In the negotiations to form a so-called traffic light coalition of the SPD, the Green Party and the Free Democratic Party (FDP) following the 2021 federal elections, Kofler was again part of her party's delegation in the working group on foreign policy, defence, development cooperation and human rights, this time co-chaired by Heiko Maas, Omid Nouripour and Alexander Graf Lambsdorff.

== Other activities ==
- action medeor, Member of the advisory board (since 2016)
- Aktion Deutschland Hilft (Germany's Relief Coalition), Member of the Board of Trustees (since 2016)
- German Institute for Human Rights (DIMR), Member of the Board of Trustees (since 2016)
- Center for International Peace Operations (ZIF), Member of the supervisory board (since 2014)
- German Foundation for World Population (DSW), Member of the Parliamentary Advisory Board
- IG BCE, Member
- IG Metall, Member
- German Corporation for International Cooperation (GIZ), Member of the Board of Trustees (2014–2016)
