= Hans Söllner =

German singer-songwriter

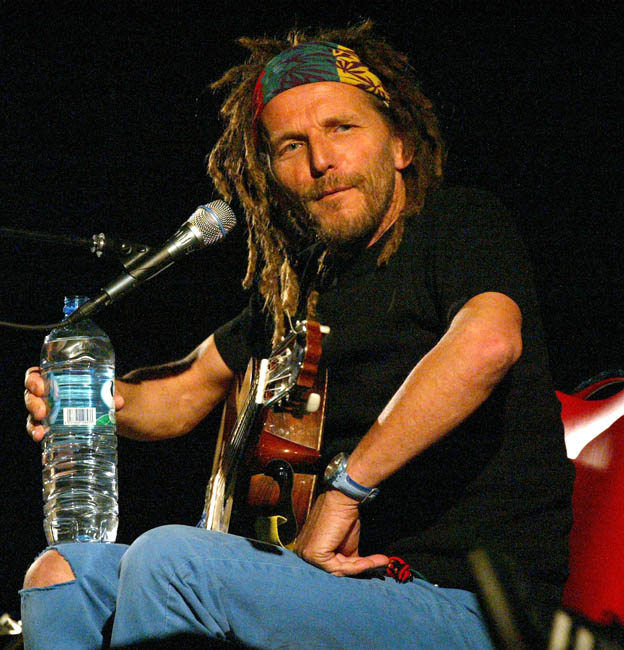
- Söllner in 2005

Background information
- Born: Johann Michael Söllner; 24 December 1955 (age 69)
- Origin: Bad Reichenhall, Germany
- Genres: Reggae; Folk
- Occupation: Singer-songwriter
- Years active: 1979–present

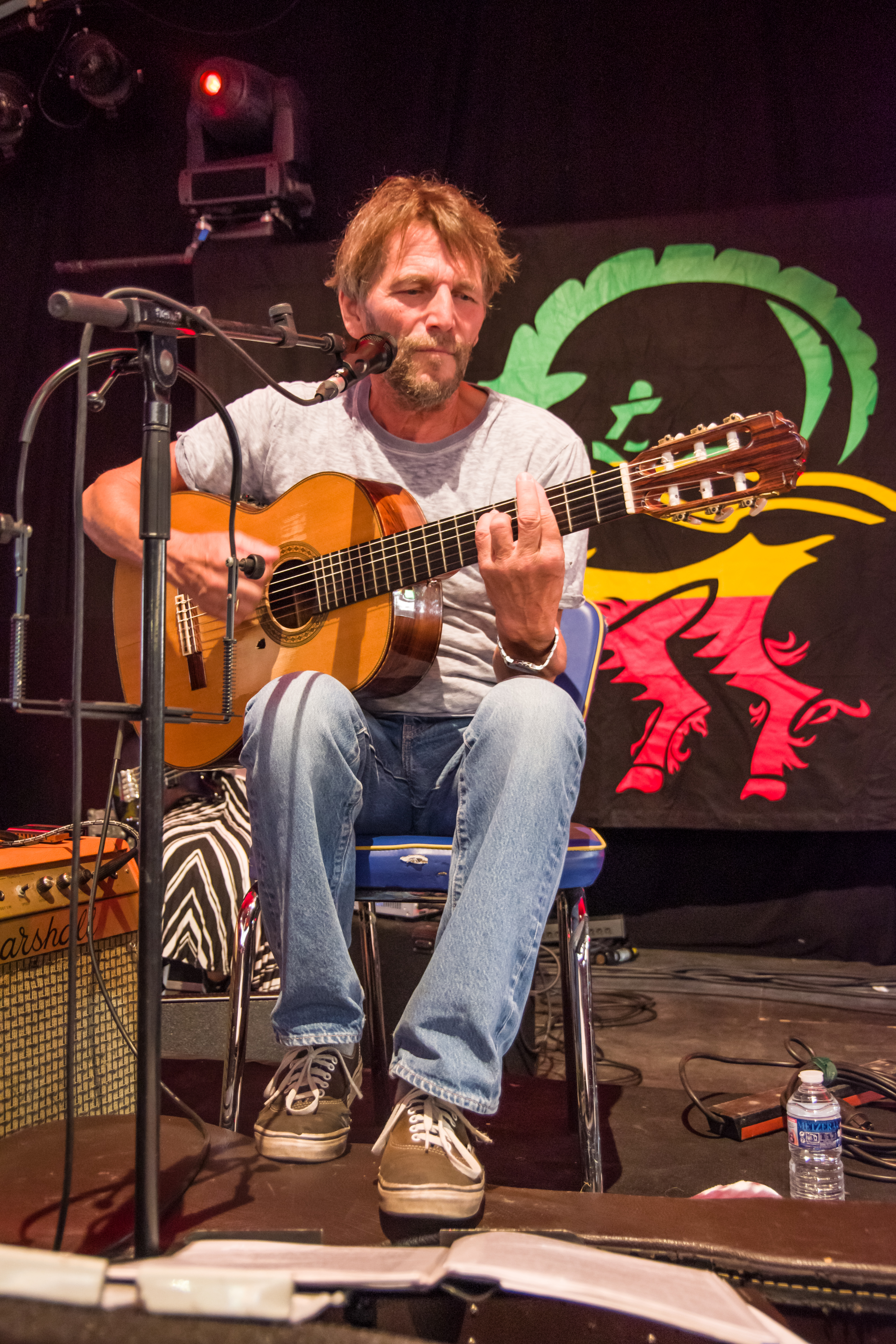
Söllner at the Zelt-Musik-Festival 2018 in Freiburg

Hans Söllner (born 24 December 1955 as Johann Michael Söllner) is a German singer-songwriter. Throughout German-speaking countries, especially in Bavaria and Austria, he is famous for his biting songs and strong political messages in Bavarian-German, publicly criticizing the politicians, government and political systems in general, which sum up to EUR 300'000 on fines. He preaches pacifism and vegetarianism, his lyrics are like stories, as they mainly deal with being in conflict with the law and everyday life problems. Söllner is Rastafari.

== Biography ==
Johann Michael Söllner was born to a Catholic family in the Bavarian town of Bad Reichenhall on 24 December 1955. He attended school in the district of Marzoll, where, in his teenage years, he decided to grow out his hair in defiance of social convention. From 1970 to 1973, he trained to become a cook, but was eventually unable to find employment; a brief spell of mandatory service in the German armed forces failed to inspire a professional commitment – neither did a subsequent apprenticeship as a mechanic.

Unemployed on and off for years in Munich, Söllner took to music as he taught himself to play guitar and began to write his own songs. In 1979, he had his first live appearance at a small venue in Munich. After winning a singing competition three years later, he was offered a recording contract with the independent label PPM (Powerplay Music Records) and made his debut in 1983 with Endlich eine Arbeit. In 1986, PPM released the album Für Marianne und Ludwig, followed a year later by Wos reimt se scho auf Nicki.

Söllner left PPM for the well-regarded independent label Trikont, based in Munich, on which he made his debut with Hey Staat! (1989). Considered by many to be his greatest album, Hey Staat! established him as a protest singer and an up-and-coming talent in the alternative music scene. In 1989, he recorded the studio album Bayerman Vibration, which was released the following year and turned out to be an instant success. In 1991, Söllner and his band Bayerman Vibration released the album Live!, a record that is no longer being published and has hence become a rarity. In 1992, Söllner released Der Charlie, which is, along with Hey Staat!, thought of as one of his greatest and simultaneously most controversial works to date. Der Charlie includes a long narration of his 1986–1987 trip to Jamaica and its influence on him in terms not only of reggae music and marijuana use, but also politics and religion.

In August 1993, Söllner announced that he was abandoning the Roman Catholic faith and converting to the Rastafari movement; he further declared himself a vegetarian and a pacifist. In 1995, he released the album Grea Göib Roud, a studio record dedicated to a friend who had died. In 1997, he released the studio album a jeda. One year later, Trikont reissued his first three albums (Endlich eine Arbeit, Für Marianne und Ludwig, and Wos reimt se scho auf Nicki), which had gone out of print following the demise of PPM. In the late 90s, Söllner was fighting criminal charges of cannabis cultivation and insulting public officials. He argued that it was his religious right as a Rastafarian to smoke marijuana, but was ultimately fined heavily and faced enormous legal expenses.

In 2000, Söllner returned with 241255, a double album composed of various live recordings from the previous years. A year on, he released Babylon, another live album, which first featured the Austrian reggae band Bayaman'Sissdem. In 2004, he released Oiwei I, his first studio effort in seven years; like his other albums from this era, it features Bayaman'Sissdem. A live CD, Im Regen, followed in 2005. In 2007, Söllner and Bayaman'Sissdem returned with a new studio album, Viet Nam. On 18 November 2011, Söllner released the studio album Mei Zuastand, which features re-recorded songs from his entire career. On 26 October 2012, he released SoSoSo, a studio record that contains new songs.

On 12 October 2018, Söllners new album "Genug" was released. It was the first album that contained new songmaterial since 2012's "SoSoSo" and the first album since 2000s "241255" on which he recorded all songs only with his acoustic guitar and without his band "Bayaman Sissdem". The only exception is the live version of the song "Rassist", which he recorded with the Dresden-based reggae combo "BANDA INTERNATIONALE" on the Afrika-Karibik-Festival in Wassertrüdingen.

== Discography ==
=== Albums ===
- 1983 – Endlich eine Arbeit
- 1986 – Für Marianne und Ludwig
- 1987 – Wos reimt se scho auf Nicki
- 1989 – Hey Staat!
- 1990 – Bayerman Vibration
- 1991 – Live!
- 1992 – Der Charlie
- 1992 – Ungehörtes und Unerhörtes
- 1993 – Fang ma do o wo ma neilich aufg'heat ham
- 1995 – Grea Göib Roud
- 1997 – a jeda
- 2000 – 241255
- 2001 – Babylon
- 2004 – Oiwei I
- 2005 – Im Regen
- 2007 – Viet Nam
- 2011 – Mei Zuastand
- 2012 – SoSoSo
- 2013 – Zuastand 2
- 2018 – Genug

One of the well known songs is Söllners birthday song "ois guade zan gebuatstog" (happy birthday), published 1995 on "grea gölb roud" (green yellow red).

Happy Birthday, I hope you live a long life, That you grow and stay healthy, And that you're always doing well. That later on, you don't go bald— Oh man, that would be tough. That you become what you want to be, And not what others tell you to be. That you speak as you've learned, Those who pay attention will understand. And above all, that your sun, Yes, that your sun never sets. That you still dance where others all sit, That you still laugh where others all cry. And that you know that we need you, But that you don't belong to us. And that you know that we need you, But that you don't belong to us.

Happy Birthday, Just make the best of it. And never believe that you're better than others, Please, hey, be careful. And never believe that you're better than others, I'm telling you, hey, be careful.

Happy Birthday, I wish that you never freeze, And that you always have something to eat, And that you have healthy children someday. That later on, you don't get a big belly, And sit in front of your TV. That someday you understand, That you can't always be silent. Don't talk about love or loyalty, Talk about respect—that includes everything. Listen when an old man says something, Even if he talks a lot of nonsense. That you keep going where others stop, That you still greet where no one says anything anymore. And that you know that you're never alone, I'm always somewhere. And that you know that you're never alone, I'm always somewhere.

Happy Birthday, Just make the best of it. And never believe that you're better than others, I'm telling you, hey, be careful. And never believe that you're better than others, I'm telling you, hey, be careful.
