= Haus der Bayerischen Geschichte =

Coordinates: 48°21′56.467942″N 10°53′47.24″E

The Haus der Bayerischen Geschichte (House of Bavarian History), or HdBG, was established in 1983 as an authority of the Free State of Bavaria, Germany and, since 1993, has had its permanent headquarters at Augsburg. On 6 October 1998 it was incorporated into the Bavarian State Ministry for Science, Research and Art (Bayerisches Staatsministerium für Wissenschaft, Forschung und Kunst). The German historian Claus Grimm was director from 1983 until 2007.

== Sources ==
- Ulla-Britta Vollhardt: Geschichtspolitik in Bayern. Das Haus der Bayerischen Geschichte: Idee – Debatte – Institutionalisierung. Utz, München 2003, ISBN 3-8316-0235-2.
