= Jochen Wirtz =

German marketing scholar

- Born: Germany
- Occupations: Academic, author
- Known for: His textbooks and research on services marketing, management, and intelligent automation in services
- Awards: Christopher Lovelock Career Contributions to the Services Discipline Award, Christian Grönroos Service Research Award 2024; American Marketing Science (AMS) Outstanding Marketing Teacher Award, ; National University of Singapore (NUS) Outstanding Educator Award

Academic background
- Education: Ph.D. (1992)
- Alma mater: London Business School
- Thesis: Consumer satisfaction with services. (1992)
- Doctoral advisor: John Bateson
- Other advisors: Andrew Ehrenberg, Mark Uncles, John Williams (Note: Mentioned in his doctoral thesis.)

Academic work
- Discipline: Marketing
- Sub-discipline: Services marketing, Consumer satisfaction, Service management
- Institutions: National University of Singapore
- Website: jochenwirtz.com

Jochen Wirtz is a marketing scholar, academic administrator and author. Wirtz is Vice Dean of MBA Programmes and Professor of Marketing at the National University of Singapore (NUS) Business School. Wirtz is best known in academia for co-authoring the widely adopted textbook Services Marketing: People, Technology, Strategy. The book, which has sold over 1.5 million copies and is widely used at universities globally, was originally initiated in collaboration with Christopher Lovelock of Harvard Business School.

== Early life and education ==
Wirtz earned his Ph.D. in services marketing from London Business School in 1991. His doctoral thesis, titled Consumer Satisfaction with Services, explored the role of performance heterogeneity and affective responses in shaping consumer satisfaction during service encounters. The study examined ways to enhance traditional satisfaction models by addressing the experiential characteristics of services.

== Career ==
Wirtz began his academic career in 1992 when he joined NUS Business School, National University of Singapore (NUS). He has served as Vice Dean for MBA Programs and Professor of Marketing at NUS Business School. He is known for playing a central role in curriculum design, programme management, and educational innovation within the MBA and Executive MBA (EMBA) offerings at NUS.

At NUS, he served as the founding director of the UCLA–NUS Executive MBA Programme from 2002 to 2017. He was also a founding member of the NUS Teaching Academy, the university’s think-tank on education, from 2009 to 2015.

As Vice Dean at NUS, Wirtz introduced reforms to the MBA Program such as pass/fail elective grading to encourage personal development and reduce grade pressure. He also promoted experiential learning through initiatives like the MBA Club Ecosystem, which helps students explore different industries and build networks. He has also embraced digital transformation of marketing, admissions, and program management.

Wirtz co-authored Services Marketing: People, Technology, Strategy, a textbook which has sold over 1.5 million copies including its adaptations and translations to 26 languages and reasons, and is used in more than 500 institutions globally. The book was originally written in collaboration with Christopher Lovelock of Harvard Business School.

Wirtz is an International Fellow at the Service Research Center at Karlstad University in Sweden, an Academic Scholar at the Cornell Institute for Healthy Futures at Cornell University, and a Global Faculty member at the Center for Services Leadership at Arizona State University. From 2008 to 2013, he was an Associate Fellow at the Saïd Business School, University of Oxford.

Wirtz was named one of the Highly Cited Researchers in economics and business by Clarivate’s Web of Science for 2022, 2023 and 2024.

Wirtz has served as a consultant with Accenture, Arthur D. Little, and KPMG. He has also been involved in several startup ventures, including Dataswyft and TranscribeMe.

== Awards ==
- Christopher Lovelock Career Contributions to the Services Discipline Award, American Marketing Association
- Christian Grönroos Service Research Award 2024 for "excellent achievements in service research challenging common understanding and demonstrating significant originality" (Note: The award celebrates leading and innovative advancements in service research.)
- Clarivate Highly Cited Researcher Award 2022, 2023, and 2024 in economics and business (Note: Based on Web of Science Citations high-impact articles.)
- Outstanding Marketing Teacher Award, Academy of Marketing Science
- Outstanding Educator Award, National University of Singapore (2005)

== Selected publications ==
=== Books ===
- Pascal Bornet, Jochen Wirtz, Thomas H. Davenport, David De Cremer, Brian Evergreen, Phil Fersht, Rakesh Gohel, and Shail Khiyara (2025). Agentic Artificial Intelligence: Harnessing AI Agents to Reinvent Business, Work, and Life. World Scientific, 2025.
- Jochen Wirtz. Essentials of Services Marketing. Pearson Education, 2023.
- Jochen Wirtz and Christopher Lovelock. Services Marketing: People, Technology, Strategy. World Scientific, 2022.
- Pascal Bornet, Ian Barkin, and Jochen Wirtz. Intelligent Automation: Learn How to Harness Artificial Intelligence to Boost Business & Make Our World More Human. Independently Published, 2021.
- Jochen Wirtz. Winning in Service Markets: Success Through People, Technology and Strategy. World Scientific, 2016.

=== Articles ===
- Jochen Wirtz and Ruth Stock-Homburg. "Generative AI Meets Service Robots." Journal of Service Research, online first (2025). doi:10.1177/10946705251340487
- Jochen Wirtz, John Bateson, Martina Čaić, Darius-Aurel Frank, and Nina Veflen. "The Healthy Aging and Service Firms: The Promise of Smart Technologies." Journal of Service Management, online first (2025). doi:10.1108/JOSM-10-2024-0426
- Jochen Wirtz, Werner H. Kunz, Nicole Hartley, and James Tarbit. "Corporate Digital Responsibility in Service Firms and Their Ecosystems." Journal of Service Research 26, No. 2 (2023): 173-190. doi:10.1177/10946705221130467
- Jochen Wirtz, Paul G. Patterson, Werner H. Kunz, Thorsten Gruber, Vinh Nhat Lu, Stefanie Paluch, and Antje Martins. "Brave New World: Service Robots in the Frontline." Journal of Service Management 29, No. 5 (2018): 907-931. doi:10.1108/josm-04-2018-0119
- Jochen Wirtz and Valarie Zeithaml. "Cost-Effective Service Excellence." Journal of the Academy of Marketing Science, 46, No. 1 (2018): 59-80. doi:10.1007/s11747-017-0560-7
