= Staatliches Landschulheim Marquartstein =

Location
- Neues Schloss 1 Marquartstein, Landkreis Traunstein, Bavaria, 83250; Germany
- Coordinates: 47°45′09″N 12°28′07″E

Information
- Founded: 1928
- Founder: Hermann Harless
- Website: www.lsh-marquartstein.de

Staatliches Landschulheim Marquartstein is a Gymnasium located in Marquartstein, southern Bavaria, Germany. The school offers a science- and technology-oriented program as well as another one focused on language.

== History ==
Founder Hermann Harless was an influential figure in the reformation of German second education, having worked on a new concept of it alongside Hermann Lietz. The result of their efforts were so-called Landerziehungsheime für Jungen ("Educational Community Home for Boys"). Their focus was put heavily on the development of a student's entire character rather than mere knowledge transfer. Those institutions were to be located away from big cities as to minimize their influence on children.

Harless joined the Neue Deutsche Schule ("New German School") of Alexander Sutherland Neill, who later became the founder of the progressive Summerhill School. After the closure of Neue Deutsche Schule Harless founded his own boarding school in 1928 in the small town of Marquartstein near the Bavarian Alps. In its first year, only 16 students enrolled in Landschulheim Marquartstein.

The concept of coeducation and a boarding school that accepts both girls and boys was new at that time and had only been implemented in a handful of schools across Germany. The success of Harless's approach reflected in a growing number of students and eventually earned him a permit to hold official Abitur graduation exams by 1940. This was a big achievement at the time as students from private schools normally had to take their final exams at a nearby public school.

Hermann Harless was the school's principal until the forced nationalization by the Nazis in 1943. Although now under the regime's control, coeducation and mixed-sex boarding houses remained in place at the Landschulheim. Ironically, the boarding school was closed for female students four years after the end of WWII by ministerial decree. Due to dwindling numbers of boarding school residents, the mixed-sex system was brought back in 1989.

== Locations ==
Landschulheim Marquartstein was situated on Marquartstein Castle for 30 years since it was founded. Male students had their dorms in a nearby farmhouse called Nockerhof. The girls' boarding school was located at an estate in the village of Grabenstätt about 10 kilometers away, which proved difficult at times in terms of transporting students between the two locations.

In 1958, the school moved its facilities to the "new castle" (Neues Schloss) which was eventually purchased in 1965. After the increase of student numbers since the boarding school's reopening for girls, new buildings for specific purposes were built like a science tract with appropriate equipment for Chemistry, Physics and Biology and a new gym.
