= Duhamel Saint-Cricq family =

French family of broadcast journalists and regional press executives

Duhamel–Saint-Cricq family
- Country: France

The Duhamel–Saint-Cricq family is a French family active in broadcast journalism and regional publishing across three generations. Members have worked at France Télévisions, BFM TV and France Inter, among others, and, through the Saint-Cricq branch, at the regional newspaper group La Nouvelle République du Centre-Ouest. Amélie Oudéa-Castéra, of the youngest generation, served as a government minister. The family's simultaneous presence on rival channels has been described in Marianne as an example of the reproduction of elites in French media.

== Background ==
The family relates to the marriage between two popular French journalists, namely Patrice Duhamel and Nathalie Saint-Cricq. The two lines are not blood related to each other. The first, descends from Michel Duhamel, a physician, and his wife Yvonne Bosquet. Their children include the political commentators Alain Duhamel and Patrice Duhamel, the paediatrician Jean-François Duhamel, and Dominique Duhamel, a former human-resources executive at Safran.

The second descends from Jean Meunier (1906–1975), a journalist, Socialist politician and French Resistance member. He was mayor of Tours from 1944 to 1947 and deputy for Indre-et-Loire, and he founded La Nouvelle République du Centre-Ouest. His daughter Mireille Meunier, a sociologist, married Jacques Saint-Cricq, later president of the newspaper's supervisory board. Their children are the journalist Nathalie Saint-Cricq and Olivier Saint-Cricq, president of the group's executive board. The link between the two families stems from Patrice Duhamel's marriage with Nathalie Saint-Cricq.

=== Media coverage of the family lineages ===
Amélie Oudéa-Castéra's 2024 cabinet appointment drew press attention to her family ties with journalists Alain Duhamel, Patrice Duhamel and Nathalie Saint-Cricq. In 2026 Nathalie Saint-Cricq declared her family's media connections as a potential conflict of interest before testifying to a parliamentary inquiry (commission parlementaire) into public-broadcasting neutrality.

Several family members appeared on rival channels on the same evening during France's 2026 municipal elections. Le Parisien and Marianne covered the overlap, and Gala later published a guide to who is who in the family.

== Family tree ==
=== The Duhamel line ===
- Michel Duhamel, physician; m. Yvonne Bosquet
  - Alain Duhamel (b. 1940), political journalist and commentator
    - Arnaud Duhamel, business lawyer
  - Jean-François Duhamel, paediatrician
  - Dominique Duhamel, former human-resources executive at Safran; m. Richard Castéra, senior civil servant
    - Amélie Oudéa-Castéra (b. 1978), businesswoman and politician; m. Frédéric Oudéa, chairman of Sanofi
  - Patrice Duhamel (b. 1945), journalist, former deputy director-general of France Télévisions; partner of Nathalie Saint-Cricq (b. 1960), political editorialist at France Télévisions (see Meunier line below ♧)
    - Alexandre Duhamel (b. 1983), operatic baritone, from an earlier relationship
    - Benjamin Duhamel (b. 1994), political journalist, France Inter

=== The Meunier Saint-Cricq line ===
- Jean Meunier (1906–1975), journalist and politician; mayor of Tours, 1944–1947; founder of La Nouvelle République du Centre-Ouest; m. Raymonde Béguet
  - Mireille Meunier, sociologist; m. Jacques Saint-Cricq, president of the supervisory board of La Nouvelle République du Centre-Ouest
    - Nathalie Saint-Cricq; partner of Patrice Duhamel (see Duhamel line above ♧)
    - Olivier Saint-Cricq, president of the executive board of La Nouvelle République du Centre-Ouest

== Notable members ==
Alain Duhamel, formerly of Le Monde, Europe 1, RTL and BFM TV, is a political commentator. His brother Patrice rose to deputy director-general of France Télévisions and has interviewed eight French presidents. Patrice's partner, Nathalie Saint-Cricq, is the broadcaster's political editorialist and co-hosted the 2017 second-round presidential debate between Emmanuel Macron and Marine Le Pen.

Among the younger generation:

- Amélie Oudéa-Castéra, a former professional tennis player and businesswoman, was Minister of Sports from 2022 to 2024 and, briefly, Minister of National Education in early 2024.
- Benjamin Duhamel, a political journalist, left BFM TV in 2025 to join France Inter's morning programme Le 7/9.
- Alexandre Duhamel is an operatic baritone who has performed at the Opéra Bastille and the Salzburg Festival.
