= Duhamel =

Duhamel is an historic surname from Northern French and Belgian families, especially from Normandy, Picardy and the Romance Low Countries (Artois and Romance Flanders), meaning from the hamlet, or from home as the word hamlet comes from the root word home. By migration, this surname is also frequent in the east of France and Switzerland and by offshore migration in the US and mainly in Canada. The name may refer to:

== People ==
- Members of the Duhamel Saint-Cricq family:
  - Alain Duhamel (born 1940), French journalist
  - Patrice Duhamel (born 1945), French journalist and author
- Antoine Duhamel (1925–2014), French composer
- Denise Duhamel (born 1961), American poet
- Georges Duhamel (1884–1966), French writer
- Helen Duhamel (1904–1991), American businesswoman and broadcaster
- Helene Duhamel (born 1962), American politician and journalist from South Dakota
- Henri-Louis Duhamel du Monceau (1700–1782), French physician, naval engineer and botanist, whose standard abbreviation as a botanist is Duhamel
- Henry Duhamel (1853–1917), French mountaineer, author and skiing pioneer
- James F. Duhamel (1858–1947), American politician and attorney from New York
- Jean-Marie Duhamel (1797–1872), French applied mathematician
- Jean-Baptiste Duhamel (1624–1706), French scientist and theologian
- Jean-Pierre-François Guillot-Duhamel (1730–1816), French engineer
- Jonathan Duhamel (born 1987), Canadian professional poker player and winner of the 2010 World Series of Poker Main Event.
- Joseph-Thomas Duhamel (1841–1909), Canadian clergyman and educator
- Josh Duhamel (born 1972), American fashion model and actor
- Judy Olson Duhamel (born 1939), American politician and educator from South Dakota
- Marcel Duhamel (1900–1977), French actor, screenwriter, translator and publisher
- Maurice Duhamel (1884–1940), French composer and Breton nationalist
- Meagan Duhamel (born 1985), Canadian figure skater
- Miguel Duhamel, (born 1968), Canadian professional motorcycle racer
- Olivier Duhamel, (born 1950), French academic and politician
- Ron Duhamel (1938–2002), Canadian politician
- Yvon Duhamel (1939–2021), Canadian professional motorcycle and snowmobile racer

== Places ==
- Duhamel, Alberta, Canada
- Duhamel, Quebec, Canada
- Duhamel-Ouest, Quebec, Canada

== Others ==
- Duhamel's principle or Duhamel's formula, a general method for obtaining solutions to inhomogeneous linear evolution equations
- Duhamel's integral is used in engineering / response theory to calculate the response of a linear system to an arbitrary excitation, provided the excitation to an impulse function is known
- 19617 Duhamel, an asteroid named for Jean-Marie Duhamel
- the Duhamel procedure, an operation to treat Hirschsprung's disease
