= Muhammad Abdallah Kounta =

French sprinter (born 1994)

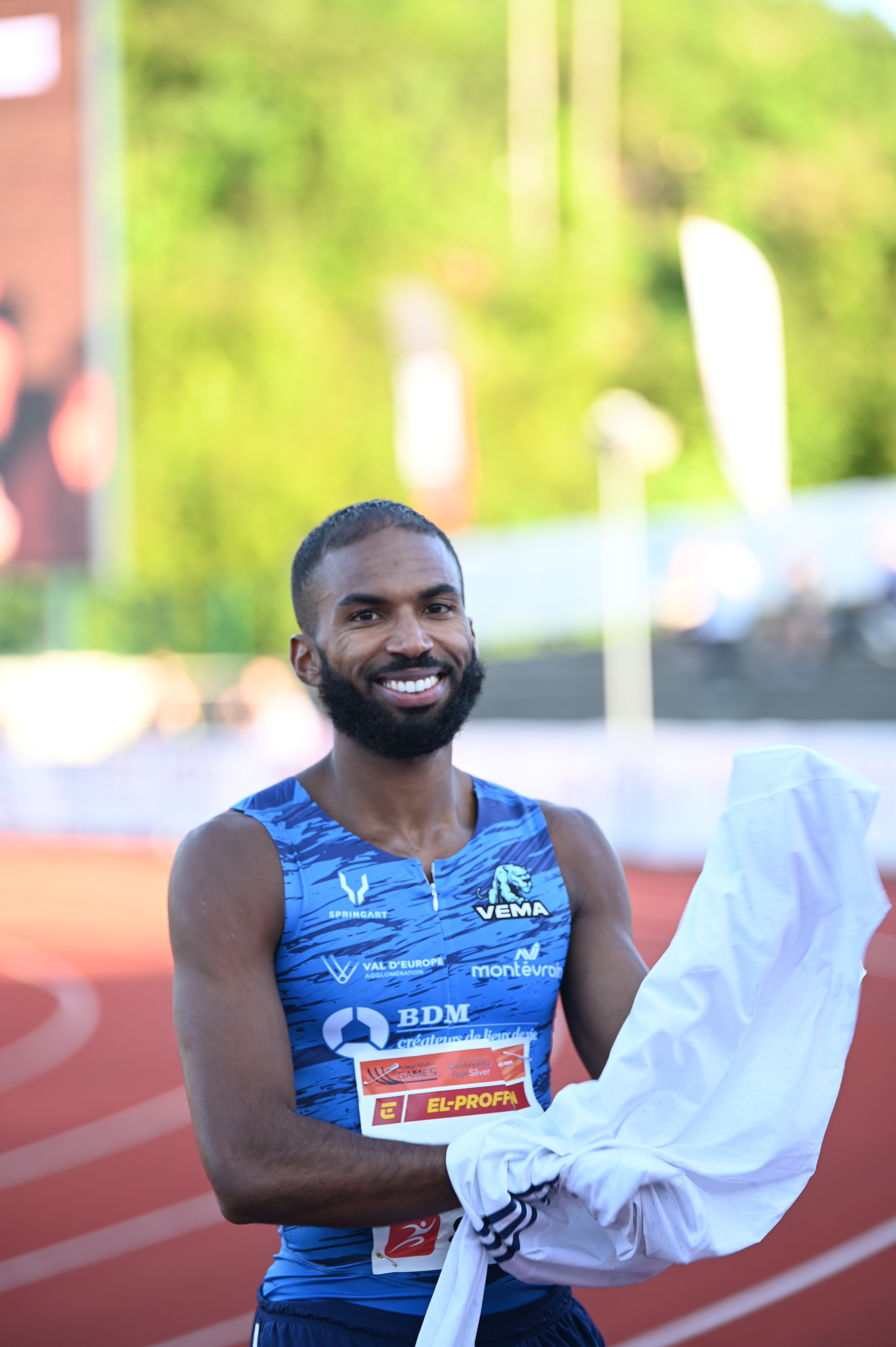
- Kounta in 2026

Personal information
- Born: 27 October 1994 (age 31) Paris, France
- Height: 1.84 m (6 ft 0 in)
- Weight: 75 kg (165 lb)

Sport
- Sport: Athletics
- Event: 400 metres

Achievements and titles
- Personal best: 45.17 (La Chaûx de Fond 2024)
Medal record
Men's athletics
Representing France
European Championships
Silver medal – second place	2026 Birmingham	400 m
European Indoor Championships
Silver medal – second place	2023 Istanbul	4 × 400 m relay

Muhammad Abdallah Kounta (born 27 October 1994) is a French Olympic sprinter. He won the silver medal in the 400 metrea at the 2026 European Championships.

== Running career ==
Kounta won the 2024 French Championships in the 400 meter run. He competed for France in the men's 4 × 400 metres relay event at the 2020 Tokyo Olympics in which France was eliminated in its first heat, and the 2024 Paris Olympics in which France came in last (ninth) in the final.

At the 2026 European Championships in Birmingham, England, Kounta won the silver medal in the 400 metres.

== Controversies ==
In August 2024, Kounta was suspended by the President of the French Athletics Federation for publishing comments inciting hatred on social media, including inciting hatred against France, white people, Christians, and Jews, as well as support for the Islamist group Hamas. Among Kounta's posts, he expressed a desire to "kill Little White."

The Federation President also made a report to the Public Prosecutor, as well as to the Federation's Disciplinary Committee, which will consider banning him permanently. French Minister of Sports Amélie Oudéa-Castéra said Kounta's posts were "as shocking as they are unacceptable." Île-de-France Regional Councilor Patrick Karam, the right-hand man of the President of the Regional Council of Île-de-France Valérie Pécresse, called for the "heaviest sanctions" to be levied against Kounta, including criminal prosecution and Kounta's permanent removal by the Federation's Disciplinary Committee. If prosecuted for inciting hatred, he could face one year in prison and a €45,000 fine.

Kounta returned to international competition in May 2025 after his suspension by the French Athletics Federation was lifted.
