= Patrick Karam =

French personality

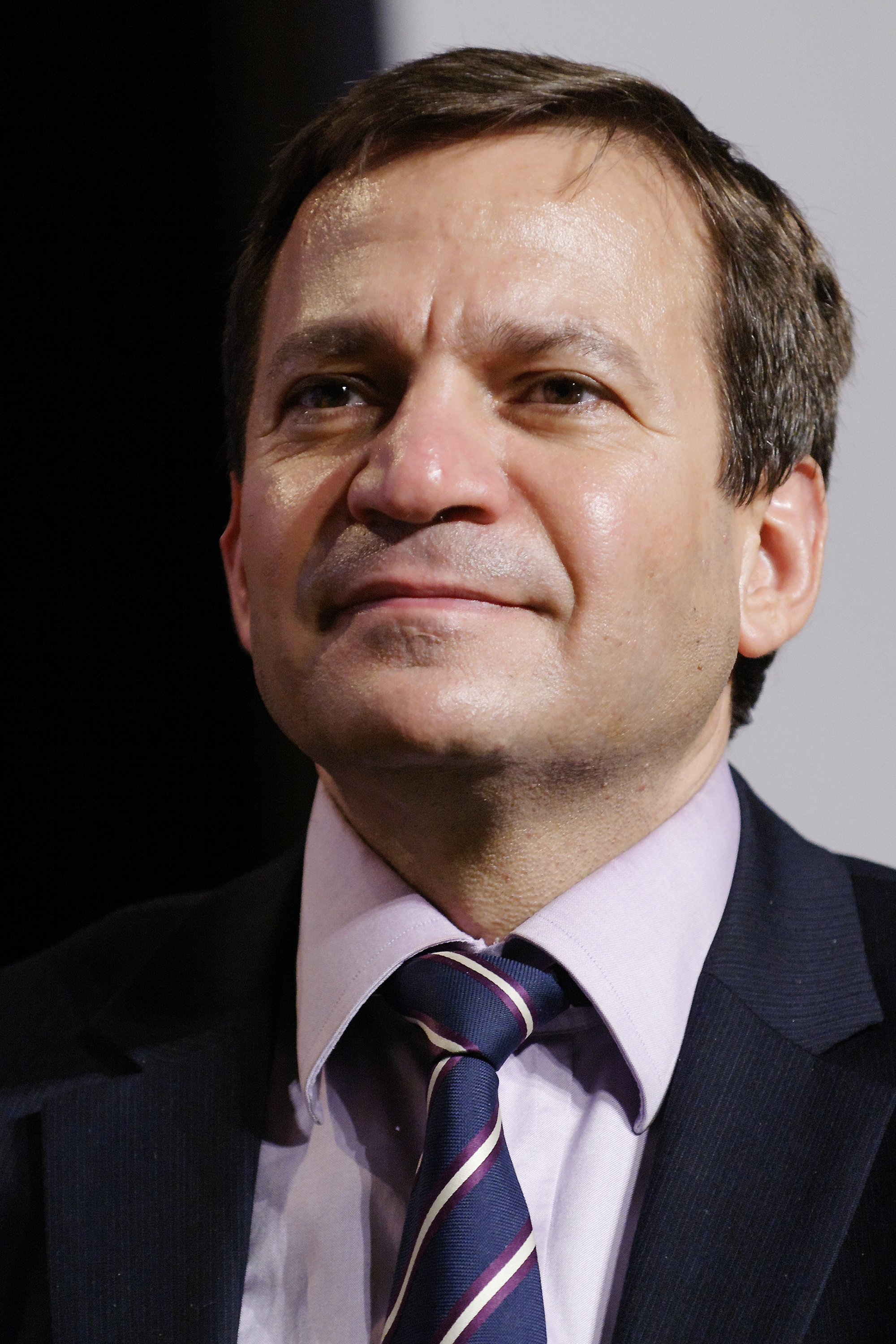
- Patrick Karam in March 2010

Member of the Regional council of Île-de-France
- Incumbent
- Assumed office 26 March 2010
- President: Jean-Paul Huchon; Valérie Pécresse

Member of League of Human Rights - France

Personal details
- Born: 8 February 1961 (age 65) Pointe-à-Pitre, Guadeloupe
- Party: UMP; The Republicans
- Spouse: Samia Badat-Karam
- Education: Paris Descartes University; Pantheon-Sorbonne University; University of Burgundy
- Profession: Lawyer

Patrick Karam (born 8 February 1961) is a French personality defending human rights. He is a researcher in international relations. He is the vice-president of the regional council of Île-de-France, responsible for youth, sports and community life.

== Early life and education ==
Of Lebanese origin, Karam lived and followed his schooling in Guadeloupe and obtained his Baccalauréat C (scientific series of the time) at Lycée Baimbridge in Guadeloupe. He holds a doctorate in political science from the University of Burgundy in Dijon.

== Career ==
A former Interministerial Delegate for Equal Opportunities for French Overseas under President Nicolas Sarkozy, Karam has been serving as regional advisor of Île-de-France (UMP) since 2010, and Inspector General of Youth and Sports since 2011.

He is the president of the Coordination of the Christians of East in Danger (CHREDO) established in September 2013. He is the first president of the Representative Council of the French Overseas.

Since December 2015 Karam has been vice-president of the regional council of Île-de-France, responsible for youth, sports and community life.

In August 2024, after French Olympic sprinter Muhammad Abdallah Kounta was suspended by the President of the French Athletics Federation for publishing comments inciting hatred on social media, including inciting hatred against France, white people, Christians, and Jews, as well as support for the Islamist group Hamas, and including his desire to “kill Little White," Karam called for the "heaviest sanctions" to be levied against Kounta, including criminal prosecution and Kounta's permanent removal by the French Athletics Federation's Disciplinary Committee.

== Human rights ==
From 1987 to 1989, Karam created and directed human rights and inter-youth solidarity, a humanitarian aid organization carrying out sister city of French schools with African schools and Lebanese. He also worked with Operation Save the Children of Lebanon during the 1989 bombings in Lebanese Civil War, which mobilized 150,000 children and thousands of schools (bringing together their drawings, poems, letters ... addressed to four heads of state).

== Political positions ==
Ahead of the Republicans’ 2016 primaries, Karam endorsed Nicolas Sarkozy as the party’s candidate for 2017 presidential elections.
