= Auvergne-Rhône-Alpes =

Administrative region of France

Auvergne-Rhône-Alpes Ôvèrgne-Rôno-Ârpes (Arpitan) Auvèrnhe Ròse Aups (Occitan)
- Region
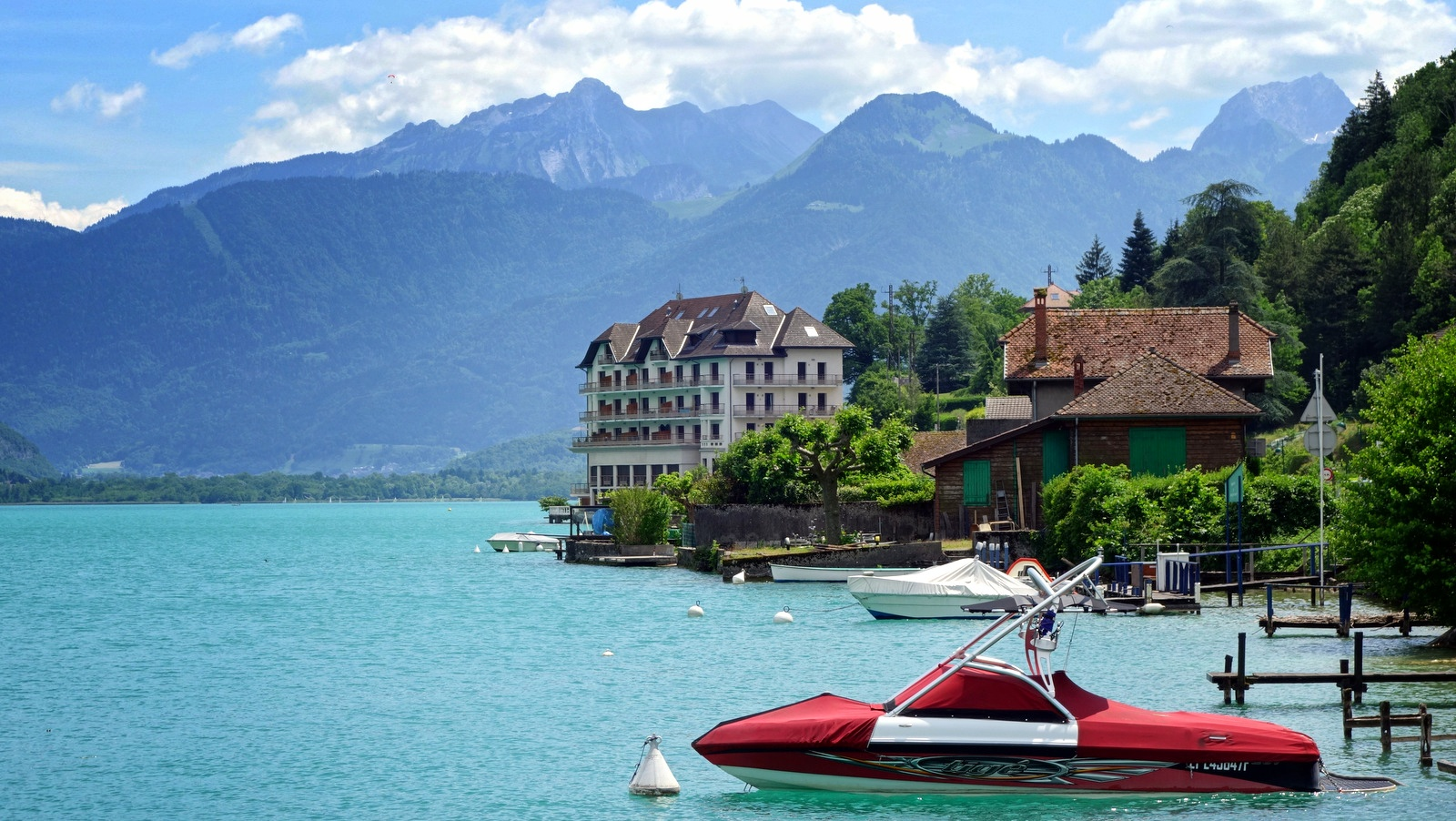
- Lake Annecy in the French Alps

- Flag Coat of arms Logo

- Country: France
- Prefecture: Lyon
- Departments: 13 (12 normal departments, and 1 metropolis): Ain (01); Allier (03); Ardèche (07); Cantal (15); Drôme (26); Haute-Loire (43); Haute-Savoie (74); Isère (38); Loire (42); Grand Lyon (69M); Puy-de-Dôme (63); Rhône (69D); Savoie (73)

Government
  - President of the Regional Council: Fabrice Pannekoucke (LR)
  - Prefect: Fabienne Buccio

Area
  - Total: 69,711 km^{2} (26,916 sq mi)
  - Rank: 4th

Population (2023)
  - Total: 8,205,557
  - Density: 117.71/km^{2} (304.86/sq mi)
- Demonym(s): Auvergnat / Rhônalpin; Aurhalpin (rare & non-official)

GDP
  - Total: €290.877 billion
  - Per capita: €36,500
- Time zone: UTC+01:00 (CET)
  - Summer (DST): UTC+02:00 (CEST)
- ISO 3166 code: FR-ARA
- Website: auvergnerhonealpes.fr

Auvergne-Rhône-Alpes (French pronunciation: [ovɛʁɲ ʁonalp]; AURA) (Note: Arpitan: Ôvèrgne-Rôno-Ârpes or Ârvèrgne-Rôno-Ârpes; Occitan: Auvèrnhe Ròse Aups or Auvèrnhe Ròse Alps; Italian: Alvernia-Rodano-Alpi.) is a landlocked region in Southern France. It was created by the 2014 territorial reform of French regions; it resulted from the merger of Auvergne and Rhône-Alpes. The new region came into effect on 1 January 2016, after the regional elections in December 2015.

The region covers an area of 69,711 km^{2} (26,916 mi^{2}), making it the third largest in metropolitan France; it had a population of 7,994,459 in 2018, second to Île-de-France. It consists of twelve departments and one collectivity with particular status (the Metropolis of Lyon) with Lyon as the prefecture.

This region combines diverse geographical, sociological, economic, and cultural areas, which was already true of Rhône-Alpes, as well as Auvergne, to a lesser extent. While the old Rhône-Alpes and Auvergne regions each enjoyed a unity defined by axes of communication and the pull of their respective metropolitan areas, (Note: except for Haute-Loire which is found in the economic region of Saint-Étienne.) the new combination is heterogeneous; it sustained lively opposition from some local officials after its creation.

== Toponymy, logo, and symbols ==
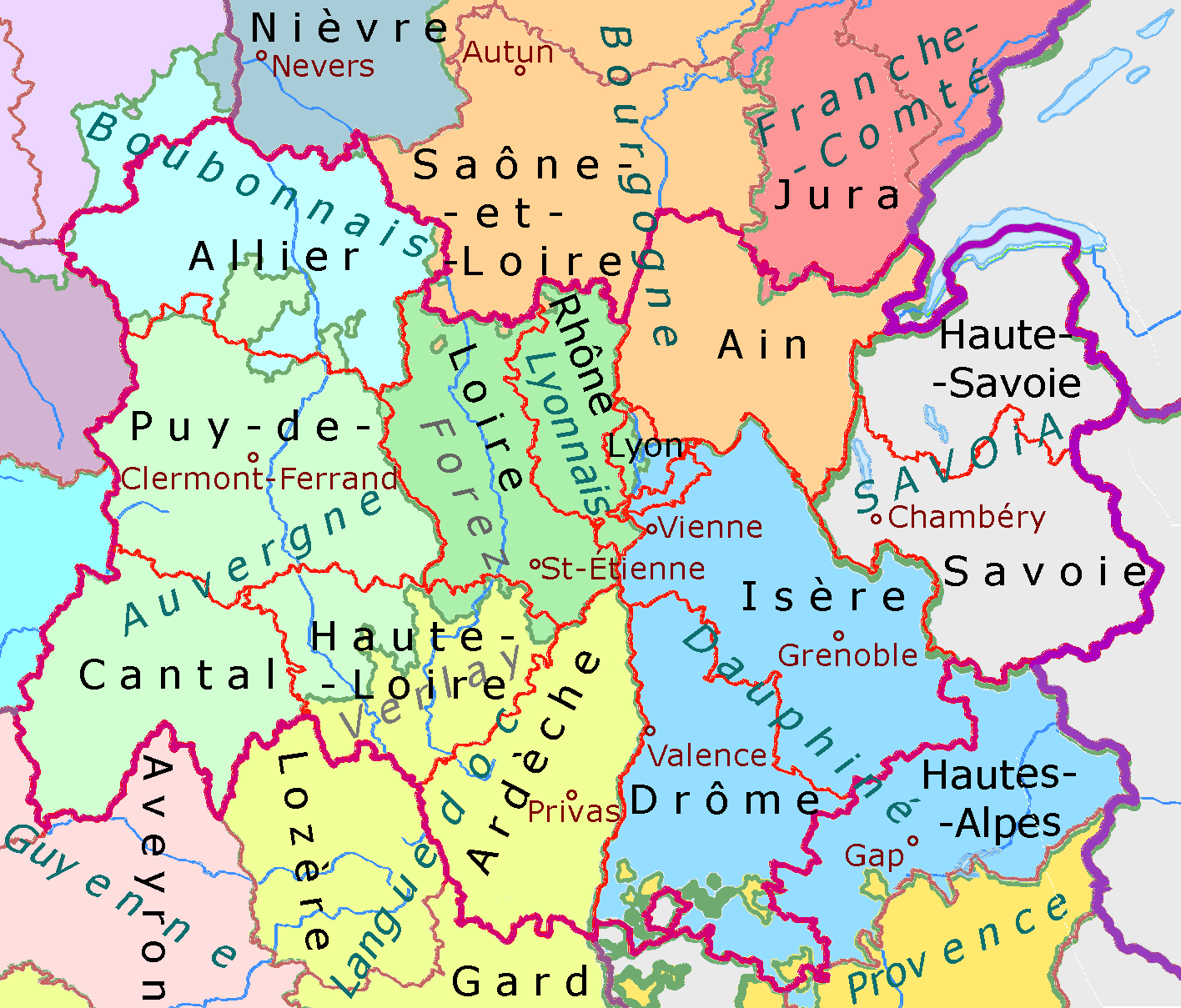
The region Auvergne-Rhône-Alpes and its departments on the background of historical provinces

The text of the territorial reform law gives interim names for most of the merged regions, combining the names of their constituent regions alphabetically, separated by hyphens. Permanent names would be proposed by the new regional councils and confirmed by the Conseil d'État by 1 October 2016.

The interim name of the new administrative region was a hyphenated placename, composed of the historic region of Auvergne, the river Rhône and the French Alps (Alpes). The same name has been chosen as the definitive name, which was officialized by the Conseil d'État on 28 September 2016.

According to several online polls from Lyon Capitale, the name "Rhône-Alpes-Auvergne" led voting, ahead of "Alpes-Auvergne" and "AURA" (an acronym for Auvergne-Rhône-Alpes), which was proposed by Jean-Jack Queyranne, former president of the regional council of Rhône-Alpes. Schoolchildren were consulted about the name of the new region in February 2016; residents were consulted in March.

After adjusting the votes in proportion to the number of inhabitants of the regions (Rhône-Alpes having five times the population of Auvergne) the name "Rhône-Alpes-Auvergne" was still leading, ahead of "Auvergne-Rhône-Alpes" and the acronym "AURA".

Despite this result, Laurent Wauquiez and his team decided not to follow the preference of the citizens of the new region, and the name Auvergne-Rhône-Alpes was put to the vote by the regional council and adopted unanimously on 23 June 2016; it was made official on 28 September 2016 through a decree appearing in the Journal Officiel de la République Française.

In October 2017, the region was given a coat of arms that combines those of Auvergne, Savoie, Lyonnais and Dauphiné. The region also has a flag, which initially consisted of the coat of arms on a white background, but was replaced by a heraldic flag in January 2018. On 9 February 2018, the region formalised the flag and the coat of arms on its website, as implemented by Mattieu Casali, a historical scholar. It was received favourably by the national heraldic commission.

The blazon is described on the region's website (in French) as "Écartelé : au premier d'or au gonfanon de gueules bordé de sinople (Auvergne); au deuxième de gueules à la croix d'argent (Savoie); au troisième de gueules au lion d'argent (Lyonnais); au quatrième d'or au dauphin d'azur, crêté, barbé, loré, peautré et oreillé de gueules (Dauphiné)," which translates roughly to: "Quartered: the first quarter, with an or (gold) background, containing a gules (red) banner fringed with vert (green), representing Auvergne; the second quarter, with a gules background, containing an argent (silver) cross, representing Savoie; the third quarter, with a gules background, containing an argent lion, representing Lyon; the fourth quarter, with an or background, containing an azure dolphin with gules details, representing the Dauphiné."

Official coat of arms, released in 2017 and officialised in 2018.

First flag, which appeared at the same time as the coat of arms.

de facto Flag used since 2018

In Arpitan and in Occitan, two of the three languages that are historically spoken in the region, the name is pronounced: (Note: Auvèrnha or Auvèrnhe in Auvergne and Vivaro-Alpine regions; Ròse as the general Occitan form; Aups in Vivaro-Alpine, Alpas in Auvergnat.)

- Arpitan: Ôvèrgne-Rôno-Arpes [o.ˌvɛr.ɲə.rɔn.ˈar.pə];
- Occitan : Auvèrnha-Ròse-Aups [ɔwˈver.ɲə.rɔz(e).ɔwp].

== Geography ==
=== Location ===
Map of the region (ML is the Lyon Metropolis)

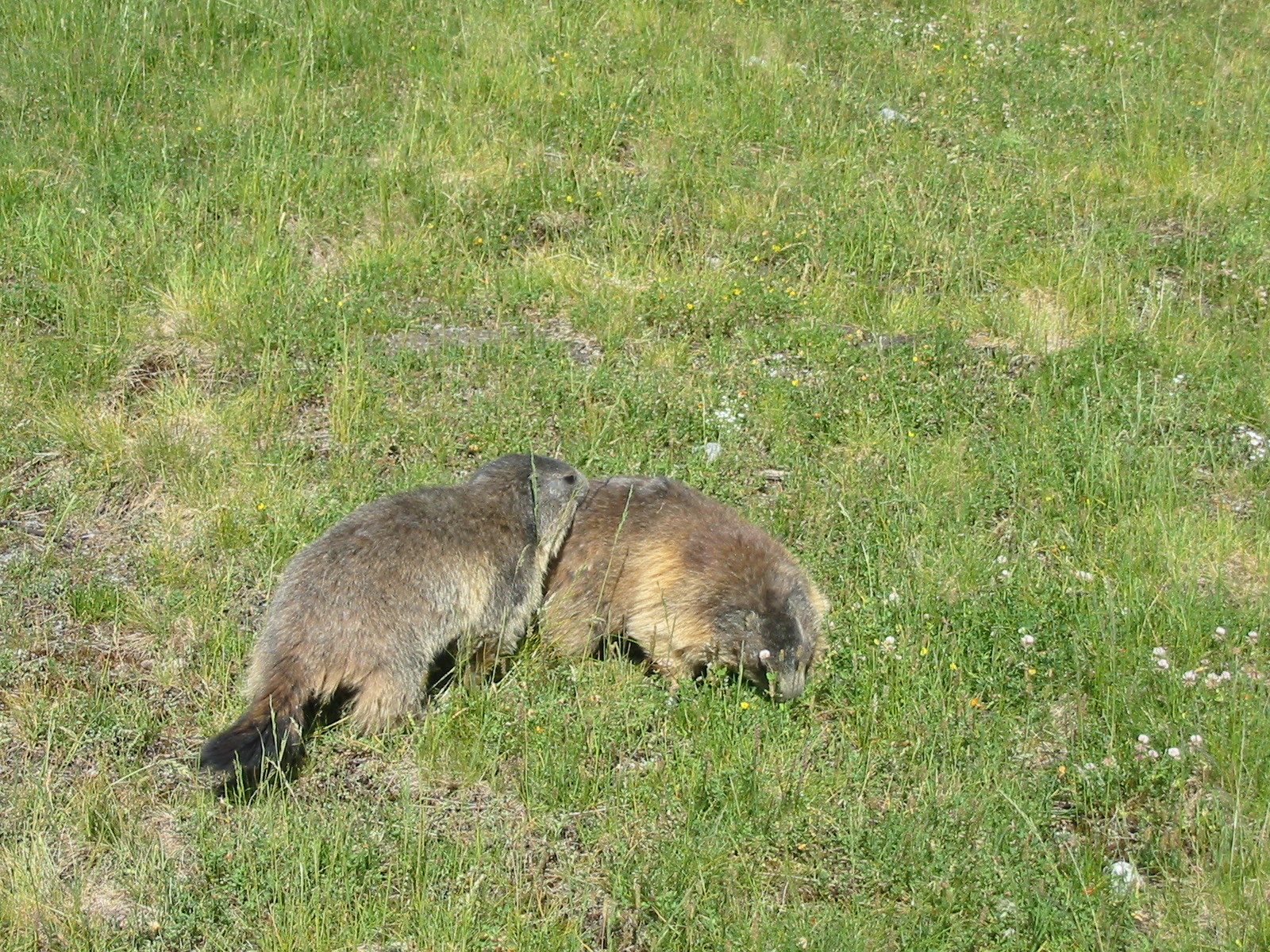
Marmots in an Alpine Meadow of Auvergne-Rhône-Alpes

The Auvergne-Rhône-Alpes administrative region covers an area of 69 711 km^{2} in the centre and east of the south of France. It is a collection of regions of diverse topographies, climates, natural resources, cultures, folklore, architecture, and languages. It is bordered by five other administrative regions: Bourgogne-Franche-Comté to the north, Centre-Val de Loire to the northwest, Nouvelle-Aquitaine to the west, Occitanie to the southwest, and Provence-Alpes-Côte d'Azur to the southeast. It is also bordered by the Italian regions of Aosta Valley and Piedmont to the east and the Swiss cantons of Geneva, Valais, and Vaud to the northeast.

Extreme points:

- North: Château-sur-Allier, Allier (46.804272°N 2.959629°E)
- East: Bonneval-sur-Arc, Savoie (45.403287°N 7.185578°E)
- South: Ferrassières, Drôme (44.115494°N 5.494467°E)
- West: Siran, Cantal (44.976621°N 2.062885°E)

=== Departments ===
Auvergne-Rhône-Alpes comprises twelve departments: Ain, Allier, Ardèche, Cantal, Drôme, Haute-Loire, Haute-Savoie, Isère, Loire, Puy-de-Dôme, Rhône, and Savoie.

=== Metropolitan centers ===
- Lyon (1,693,159; region prefecture)
- Grenoble (454,759)
- Saint-Étienne (375,389)
- Clermont-Ferrand (273,443)
- Chambéry (196,574)
- Annecy (182,901)

=== Important train stations ===
- Lyon Part-Dieu
- Lyon Perrache
- Valence-Ville
- Valence-TGV
- Saint-Étienne-Châteaucreux
- Grenoble
- Bourg-Saint-Maurice
- Chambéry-Challes-Les-Eaux
- Modane
- Clermont-Ferrand
- Geneve Cornavin

== Economy ==
The gross domestic product (GDP) of the region was 270.0 billion euros (327.0 billion dollars) in 2018, accounting for 11.9% of French economic output. GDP per capita adjusted for purchasing power was 30,200 euros or 100% of the EU27 average in the same year. The GDP per employee was 109% of the EU average.

== Transport ==
The region's main airport is Lyon–Saint-Exupéry Airport which provides most domestic and international destinations, it handles more than 10 million passengers per year. Eastern parts of the regions including the city of Annecy are also served by Geneva Airport located 45 km (28 mi) away north of the city, taking advantage of the Schengen Area laws allowing passage in and out of Switzerland.

There are other airports across the region such as Chambéry Airport, Clermont-Ferrand Auvergne Airport and Grenoble Alpes Isère Airport.

== Politics ==
The region is governed by the Regional Council of Auvergne-Rhône-Alpes, consisting of 204 members. The current regional council was elected in regional elections on 20 and 27 June 2021, with the list of Laurent Wauquiez consisting of The Republicans (LR) and the Union of Democrats and Independents (UDI) securing an absolute majority of 136 seats.

2021 regional elections in Auvergne-Rhône-Alpes
Candidate	List	First round		Second round		Seats	+/-
Candidate	List	Votes	%	Votes	%	Seats	+/-
Laurent Wauquiez *	LR-UDI-LMR-VIA	751,375	43.85	960,785	55.20	136	+23
Fabienne Grébert	EÉLV-G·s-GÉ	248,017	14.47	585,039	33.61	51	-6
Najat Vallaud-Belkacem	PS-PRG-GRS-CÉ	195,727	11.42	585,039	33.61	51	-6
Cécile Cukierman	PCF-LFI	95,434	5.57	585,039	33.61	51	-6
Andréa Kotarac	RN-LDP	211,178	12.32	194,789	11.19	17	-17
Bruno Bonnell	MR-LREM-MoDem-Agir	168,292	9.82				
Chantal Gomez	LO	26,742	1.56				
Shella Gill	DIV	11,198	0.65				
Farid Omeir	UDMF	5,684	0.33				
Valid votes		1,713,647	97.30	1,740,613	96.57		
Blank ballots		30,859	1.75	41,392	2.30		
Null Ballots		16,712	0.95	20,502	1.14		
Turnout		1,761,218	32.59	1,802,507	33.35	204	Steady
Abstentions		3,642,126	67.41	3,602,658	66.65		
Registered voters		5,403,344	100	5,405,165	100		

== Visual identity ==
The official pictogram of Auvergne-Rhône-Alpes, designed by Graphéine in 2017.

The visual identity of the Auvergne-Rhône-Alpes region was adopted in 2017 following the territorial merger of Auvergne and Rhône-Alpes. The logotype consists of a two-tone pictogram synthesizing the three geographical components of the territory: a peak for the Alps, a crater hollow evoking the volcanoes of Auvergne in the Massif Central, and a horizontal line representing the Rhône river.

== See also ==
- Regions of France
