= Nathalie Saint-Cricq =

French journalist (born 1962)

- In a 2023 interview
- Born: Nathalie Isabelle Saint-Cricq; 31 July 1962 (age 64); Tours, France
- Education: Sciences Po
- Occupation: Journalist
- Employer: France Télévisions
- Television: L'Émission politique Des paroles et des actes À vous de juger
- Partner: Patrice Duhamel

Nathalie Isabelle Saint-Cricq (born 1962) is a French journalist working for France Télévisions.

== Early life and career ==
Nathalie Saint-Cricq was born in Tours on 31 July 1962. She earned her degree from Sciences Po in 1983, and a "Diploma of Higher Specialised Studies" in marketing in 1985, before gaining a master's degree in literature. Saint-Cricq produced reports for La Cinq and then France 2. From 2006 to 2009, she presented the programme Quand j'étais petit on Europe 1. She was then chief editor for the programmes Des paroles et des actes and À vous de juger on France 2.

At the end of June 2012, Saint-Cricq succeeded Fabian Namias as head of political affairs on France 2. On 3 May 2017, with co-hosted the televised debate of the second round of the 2017 French presidential election between Marine Le Pen and Emmanuel Macron. Since September 2017, she was a commentator on L'Émission politique on France 2, presented by Léa Salamé. In July 2019, she was promoted to become political editorialist of France Télévisions.

== Personal life ==
Saint-Cricq is the daughter of Jacques Saint-Cricq, president of the supervisory board of La Nouvelle République du Centre-Ouest, and the granddaughter of Jean Meunier, founder of the same newspaper, and French Socialist politician, who took part in the French Resistance. The Saint-Cricq family is one of the two controlling shareholders of the Nouvelle République du Centre-Ouest press group, which edits the newspaper of the same name, several other titles in the written press, and owns a 40% share in the channel TV Tours Val de Loire. Saint-Cricq's brother, Olivier Saint-Cricq, is the head of the management board. Saint-Cricq's partner is journalist Patrice Duhamel. In 2009, she signed a petition in support of film director Roman Polanski, calling for his release after Polanski was arrested in Switzerland in relation to his 1977 charge for drugging and raping a 13-year-old girl.
