= Nicorps =

- Commune
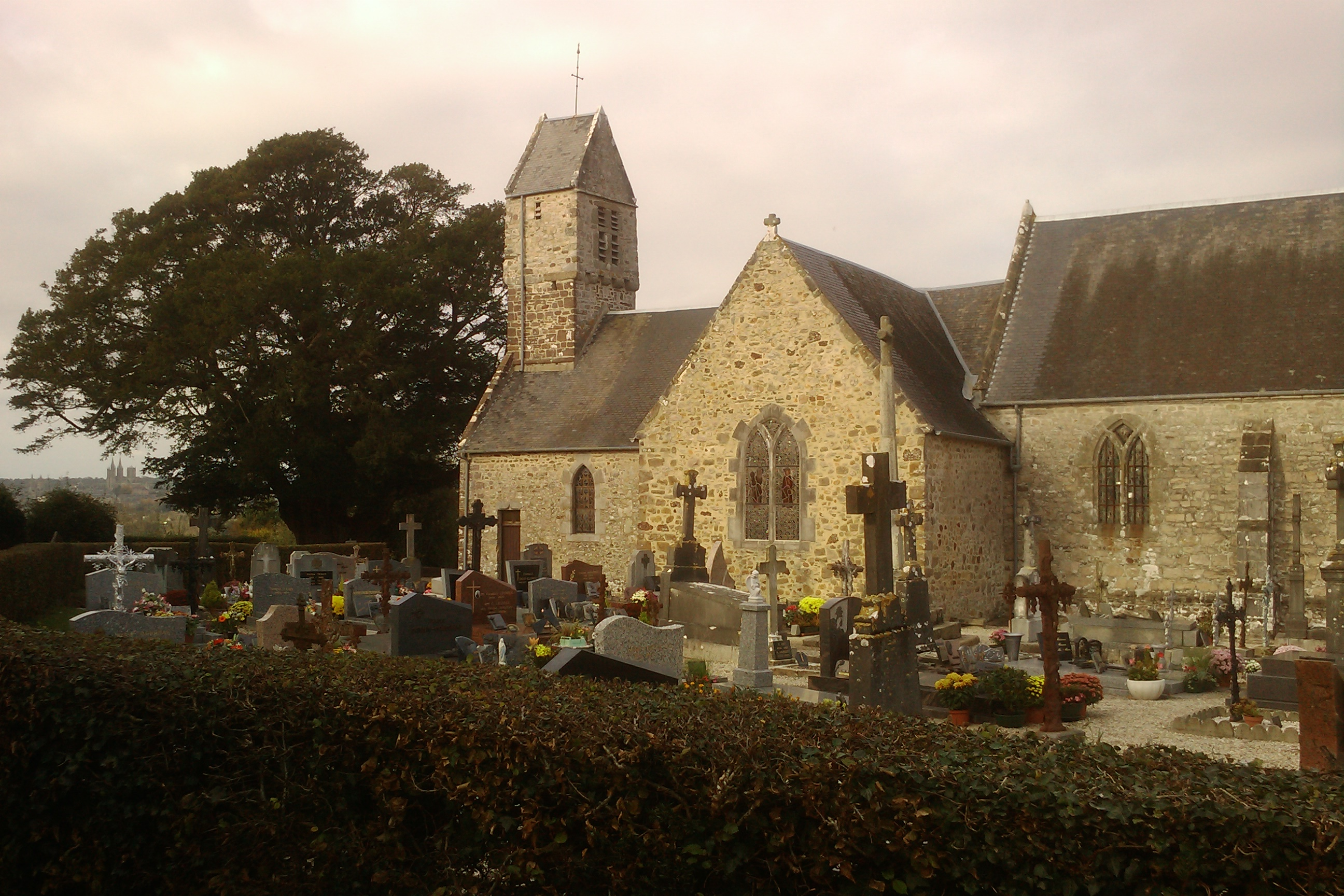
- The church of Saint-Corneille
- Location of Nicorps
- Location within France Location within Normandy
- Coordinates: 49°01′39″N 1°25′11″W
- Country: France
- Region: Normandy
- Department: Manche
- Arrondissement: Coutances
- Canton: Coutances
- Intercommunality: Coutances Mer et Bocage

Government
  - Mayor (2020–2026): Yves Lemouton
- Area^{1}: 5.63 km^{2} (2.17 sq mi)
- Elevation: 100 m (330 ft)
- Highest elevation: 108 m (354 ft)
- Lowest elevation: 15 m (49 ft)
- Population (2023): 354
  - Density: 62.9/km^{2} (163/sq mi)
- Time zone: UTC+01:00 (CET)
  - Summer (DST): UTC+02:00 (CEST)
- INSEE/Postal code: 50376 /50200
- ^{1} French Land Register data, which excludes lakes, ponds, glaciers > 1 km^{2} (0.386 sq mi or 247 acres) and river estuaries.

Nicorps (French pronunciation: [nikɔʁ]) is a commune in the Manche department in Normandy in north-western France.

== Notable people ==
- Jean-Pierre-François Guillot-Duhamel (1730–1816), engineer

== See also ==
- Communes of the Manche department
