= Amsalem =

Amsalem is a surname of Maghrebi Jewish origin. Notable people with the surname include:

- Bernard Amsalem (born 1951), French organizer of athletics
- David Amsalem (born 1971), Israeli footballer
- Dudu Amsalem (born 1960), Israeli politician
- Haim Amsalem (born 1959), Israeli politician
- Reymond Amsalem (born 1978), Israeli actress
- Shimon Amsalem (born 1966), Israeli basketball player
- Nissim Eliad (born Nissim Amsalem 1919), Israeli politician and lawyer

== See also ==
- Gett: The Trial of Viviane Amsalem, 2014 film
