= Amélie Oudéa-Castéra =

French politician (born 1978)

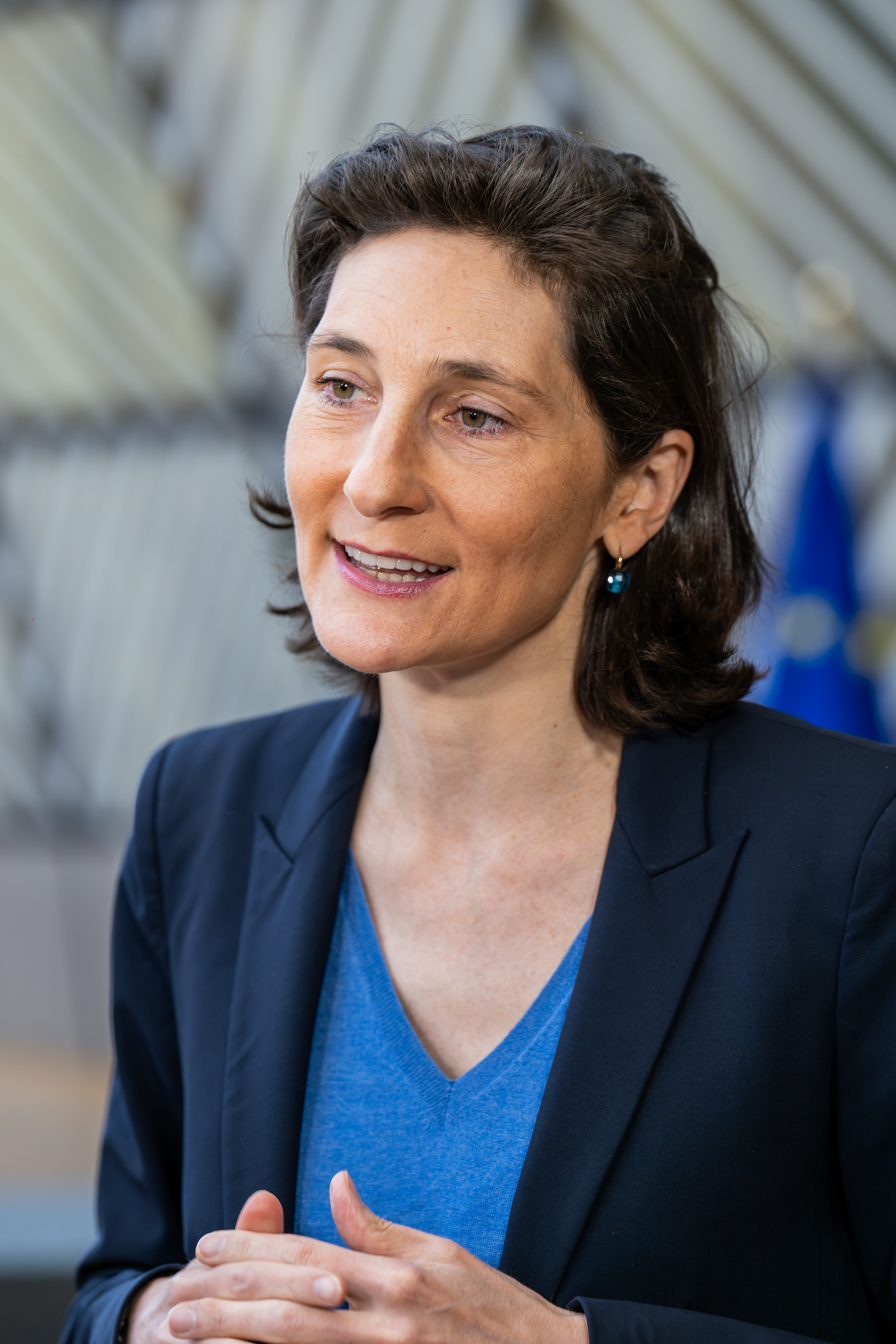
- Oudéa-Castéra in 2024

President of the Comité National Olympique et Sportif Français
- Incumbent
- Assumed office 19 June 2025
- Preceded by: David Lappartient

Minister of Sports and Olympic and Paralympic Games
- In office 20 May 2022 – 21 September 2024
- Prime Minister: Élisabeth Borne; Gabriel Attal
- Preceded by: Roxana Maracineanu
- Succeeded by: Gil Avérous

Minister of National Education
- In office 11 January 2024 – 8 February 2024
- Prime Minister: Gabriel Attal
- Preceded by: Gabriel Attal
- Succeeded by: Nicole Belloubet

Personal details
- Born: Amélie Castéra; 9 April 1978 (age 48) Paris, France
- Party: Renaissance
- Spouse: Frédéric Oudéa (m. 2006)
- Children: 3
- Education: Sciences Po; ESSEC Business School; École nationale d'administration
- Tennis career
- Retired: 1996
- Plays: Left-handed
- Prize money: $35,797

Singles
- Career record: 68–56
- Highest ranking: No. 251 (8 May 1995)

Grand Slam singles results
- French Open: 1R (1994)

Doubles
- Career record: 8–23
- Highest ranking: No. 296 (1 April 1996)

Amélie Oudéa-Castéra ([ameli udeakasteʁa]; born 9 April 1978) is a French politician, businesswoman, and former professional tennis player who served as Minister of Sports and Olympic and Paralympic Games in the government of successive Prime Ministers Élisabeth Borne and Gabriel Attal from May 2022 to September 2024.

== Tennis career ==
Born in Paris, Castéra was the 14-and-under Junior Orange Bowl champion in 1992. She was a girls' singles semi-finalist at the 1993 US Open, 1994 French Open and 1994 Wimbledon Championships.

As a professional player she reached a best singles ranking of 251 in the world. Castéra competed as a wildcard in the women's singles main draw at the 1994 French Open, where she lost in the first round to Sabine Appelmans. On the WTA Tour she qualified for two tournaments, the 1994 Internationaux de Strasbourg and 1995 Eastbourne International.

== Career in business ==
Oudéa-Castéra was the Director General of the French Tennis Federation (FFT). She was the former head of e-commerce, data, and digital at French retailer Carrefour. She was also a former senior executive at insurance firm AXA.

== Political career ==
Oudéa-Castéra briefly held the additional portfolio of National Education under Prime Minister Gabriel Attal in January 2024. Following her nomination, however, she became the subject of public criticism after claiming her "frustration" over teacher absences in her eldest son's state school had been behind the choice to move him to the private, catholic Collège Stanislas. Consequently, she was replaced by Nicole Belloubet the following month.

In March 2024, Oudéa-Castéra revealed that since the year 2020, sex abuse complaints had been filed against 1,284 coaches, teachers and sports officials, with 186 facing criminal proceedings and 624 being sanctioned with temporary or permanent bans. According to Oudéa-Castéra, more than 300 French coaches, teachers and sports officials were accused of sexual abuse or covering up sex abuse in the year 2023.

On 13 July 2024, Oudéa-Castéra swam in the River Seine for a television crew from BFM TV to help assauge concerns about the cleanliness of the waterway and its proposed role in the upcoming 2024 Summer Olympics.

In August 2024, after French Olympic sprinter Muhammad Abdallah Kounta was suspended by the President of the French Athletics Federation for publishing comments inciting hatred on social media, including inciting hatred against France, white people, Christians, and Jews, as well as support for the Islamist group Hamas, and including his desire to "kill Little White," Oudéa-Castéra said Kounta's posts were "as shocking as they are unacceptable."

== Later career ==
Since 2025, Oudéa-Castéra has been serving as president of the French National Olympic and Sports Committee.

== Personal life ==
In 2006, Oudéa-Castéra married banker Frédéric Oudéa, who is the former CEO of Société Générale and current president of the board of Sanofi. She has three children.

She belongs to the Duhamel family, prominent in the French media for multiple generations.

== ITF finals ==
=== Singles (0–1) ===
Legend
$10,000 tournaments

Outcome	No.	Date	Tournament	Surface	Opponent	Score
Runner-up	1.	2 May 1994	Balaguer, Spain	Clay	(Spain) Rosa María Pérez	4–6, 4–6
