= Kassya (opera) =

French-language opera in 4 acts and 5 tableaux

Kassya is a French-language opera in 4 acts and 5 tableaux by Léo Delibes to a libretto by Henri Meilhac and Philippe Gille after a novella by Leopold von Sacher-Masoch. Unfinished on Delibes' death in 1891, it was completed and orchestrated by Jules Massenet in 1893.

The opera was premiered at the Opéra-Comique, Paris, on 24 March 1893, with the following cast:

- Sonia – Cécile Simonnet
- Kassya – Mme De Nuovina
- La Bohémienne – Mlle Elven
- Nidda – Mlle Delorn
- Lacka – Mlle Robert
- Cyrille – M. Gibert
- Le comte de Zévale – Gabriel Soulacroix
- Kotska – M. Lorrain
- Kolénati – M. Challet
- Mockou – M. Bernaert
- Un sergent – M. Artus
- Yahn – M. Troy

Source: Les Annales du théâtre et de la musique, 1893.

The opera was respectfully received, but the general view was that it showed the composer's creative gifts in decline. It ran for twelve performances. A modern critic considered that the libretto was weak, but the last two acts, with the stamp of Massenet most in evidence, are the best, with the ballet full of Hungarian colour.

The work was performed in concert in July 2018 in Montpellier with Cyrille Dubois as Cyrille, Véronique Gens in the title role, Alexandre Duhamel as the count, and Anne-Catherine Gillet as Sonia, conducted by Michael Schønwandt.

== Sources ==
- Noël, Édouard; Edmond Stoullig (1894). Les Annales du théâtre et de la musique, 1893 (in French). Paris: G Charpentier. OCLC 777138181.
