= Jacqueline Baudrier =

French journalist (1922–2009)

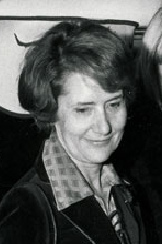
- Baudrier in 1977

Permanent representative of France to UNESCO
- In office 1981–1985
- President: François Mitterrand
- Preceded by: François Valéry
- Succeeded by: Gisèle Halimi

Personal details
- Born: Jacqueline Hélène Vibert; 16 March 1922 Beaufai, Orne, France
- Died: 2 April 2009 (aged 87) 16th arrondissement of Paris, France
- Spouse(s): Maurice Baudrier; Roger Perriard
- Education: University of Paris

Jacqueline Hélène Baudrier (French pronunciation: [ʒaklin elɛn bodʁije]; born Jacqueline Vibert, 16 March 1922 – 2 April 2009) was a French radio and television journalist, UNESCO ambassador and in 1975 became President-General Director of Radio France.

== Early life ==
Baudrier was born Jacqueline Vibert on 16 March 1922 in Beaufai, Orne, France.

== Career ==
Baudrier began her career at Radio Guadaloupe in 1948 before moving to RTF (for Radiodiffusion télévision française) in 1950.

From 1950 to 1960, she held numerous posts in print, radio and television for RTF. As a foreign policy columnist for the Spoken Newspapers, she became known as a voice of French radio on "News from Paris" to "Paris Inter," which became "France Inter." Later as a television journalist (1960–1962), she presented the news on ''France Inter.'' From that time on, she assumed positions of increasing responsibility in journalism.

- Editor and editor-in-chief of the ORTF (Office de Radiodiffusion Télévision Française) Newspaper (1966–1968)
- Deputy Director of Broadcasting, Information Officer (1968–1969)
- Director of Information for the second television channel (1969–1972)
- Managing director of the first television channel (1972–1974)
- President and Chief Executive Officer of Radio France (1975–1981)

A Gaullist, she was among the few journalists who did not go on strike during May 68, and was not fired afterward. According to one biography, while working at Radio France she improved the status of women by "contributing to the presence of 42 percent of women in Radio France, including key positions… the orchestras of Radio France stand out with 31 percent women."

=== Debate moderator ===
In 1974, she was one of two moderators of the first nationally televised debate between two presidential candidates (Valéry Giscard d'Estaing and François Mitterrand) during the final round of a national election. Her co-host was journalist Alain Duhamel. Baudrier called it a "great event without precedent on French television." At the time, the two candidates were tied in popular polling; Valéry Giscard d'Estaing later won that election.

=== Television producer ===
Baudrier was listed as a producer for episodes in French of Le Troisième Oeil (1971), the short documentary film Jeanne Raconte Jeanne (1970) and parts of the television series Le grand échiquier (1972).

=== Notable positions ===
- President-General Director of Radio France (1975–1981)
- Member of the High Committee on the French Language (1980–83)
- UNESCO Ambassador, Permanent Delegate of France (1981–1985) and Member of the Executive Board (1984-85)
- Member of the National Commission for Communication and Freedoms (often abbreviated as CNCL), the French audiovisual regulator (1986–1989)
- President, program committee for La Cinquième, the public television channel now known as France 5 (1994)
- Vice president of the French National Commission for UNESCO (1996)

== Personal life ==
Baudrier studied history at the Sorbonne in Paris. She was married first to Maurice Baudrier and then to journalist Roger Perriard. She was also known as Jacqueline Baudrier-Perriard.

She died in Paris on 2 April 2009 at the age of 87.

== Honors and distinctions ==
This list includes some of Baudrier's honors and awards.

- Commander, Legion of Honor (1999)
- Commander, National Order of Merit
- Grand Officer, Italian National Order
- Officer of the National Order of the Ivory Coast
- Knight of the Order of Cedar of Lebanon

Recipient of the Maurice Bourdet Prize (1960), Ondas International Prize (1969), Unda Prize (1972), and Louise Weiss Foundation Prize (1997).
