= Benjamin Duhamel =

French political journalist (born 1994)

Benjamin Duhamel is a French political journalist. After a long career at BFM TV, he began work on the France Inter morning broadcast beginning in late summer 2025.

== Biography ==
=== Private life ===
Benjamin Duhamel was born March 15, 1994, to Patrice Duhamel, the former director of France Télévisions, and Nathalie Saint-Cricq, former head of the politics division at France 2. His family owns a majority stake in the Nouvelle République du Centre-Ouest, a media conglomerate based in Tours. He is the nephew of Dr. Jean-François Duhamel, RTL and BFM TV editor Alain Duhamel, and Dominique Castéra (née Duhamel), thus cousin of Amélie Oudéa-Castéra, Minister of Sports and the Olympic & Paralympic Games from May 2022 to September 2024 (and briefly Minister of National Education and Youth from January to February 2024). He has four brothers, Jean, Nicolas, Alexandre, and Raphaël.

Duhamel is in a relationship with political journalist Agathe Lambret.

=== Early life and education ===
After completing his secondary studies at the École Jeannine-Manuel and Lycée Henri-IV, Duhamel enrolled at the Institut d'études politiques de Paris (Sciences Po), where he received a diploma in 2017.

=== Professional career ===
After completing an internship with a cabinet minister, Duhamel was hired out of college by RTL, the start of his journalistic career. He went on to join the editorial team at LCI in 2018, then became a political journalist for BFM TV at the end of 2019. By September 2023, he was host of the Sunday political interview hour at noon, and evening host of the broadcast C'est pas tous les jours dimanche.

In 2024, Duhamel took over for Yves Calvi as host of the 6:50 – 8pm time slot for BFM TV.

In June 2025, Duhamel left BFM TV to join the France Inter morning broadcast Le sept neuf. He first aired alongside Nicolas Demorand and Sonia Devillers on August 25, 2025.
