= Gil Avérous =

French politician (born 1973)

Minister of Sports, Youth and Community Life
- In office 21 September 2024 – 23 December 2024
- Prime Minister: Michel Barnier
- Preceded by: Amélie Oudéa-Castéra
- Succeeded by: Marie Barsacq

Mayor of Châteauroux
- Incumbent
- Assumed office 30 March 2014
- Preceded by: Jean-François Mayet

Mayor of Fontguenand
- In office 16 March 2008 – 30 March 2014
- Preceded by: Bernard Favraud
- Succeeded by: Alain Moreau

Member of the Les Bordes City Council
- In office 18 June 1995 – 18 March 2001

Personal details
- Born: 12 July 1973 (age 53)
- Party: Independent (2023–present)
- Other political affiliations: RPR (1995–2002); UMP (2002–2015); LR (2015–2023)

Gil Avérous (born 12 July 1973) is a French politician who briefly served as Minister of Sports, Youth and Community Life in the government of Prime Minister Michel Barnier in 2024.

Since 2014, Avérous has been serving as mayor of Châteauroux. Until 2023, he was a member of The Republicans.
