= Patrice Duhamel =

French journalist and author (born 1945)

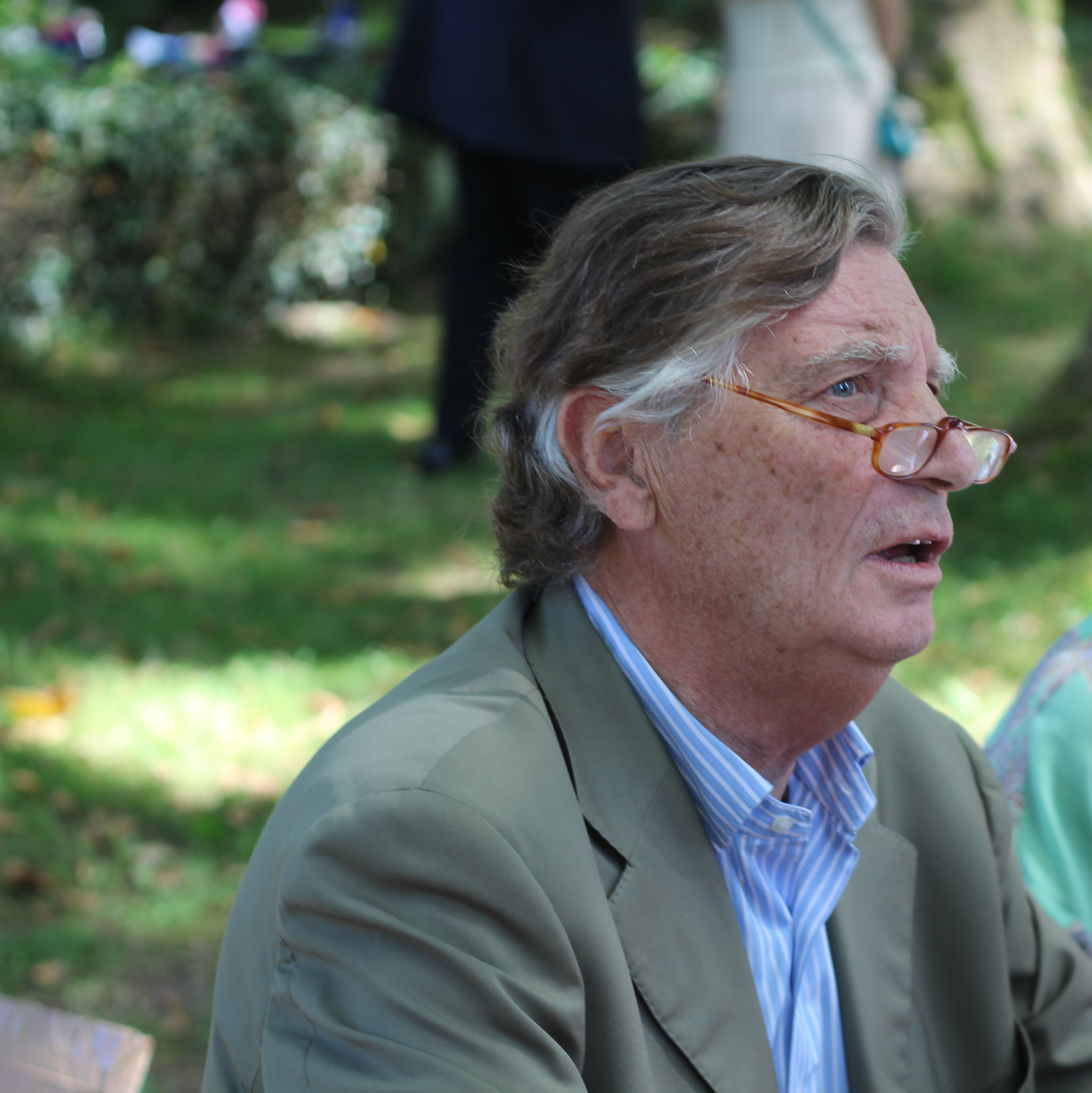
- Patrice Duhamel in 2014
- Born: 12 December 1945 (age 80); Boulogne-Billancourt, France
- Occupation: Journalist
- Partner: Nathalie Saint-Cricq
- Relatives: Alain Duhamel, Jean-François Duhamel (brothers)

Patrice Duhamel (born 12 December 1945), in Boulogne-Billancourt, is a French journalist and author.

After starting his career at ORTF, he worked at TF1, then RMC before returning to France 5.

Patrice Duhamel served as program director at France Inter, deputy editor of Figaro Magazine, and later as general director of France Télévisions.

Over the course of his career, Duhamel has interviewed eight French presidents and 24 prime ministers. His new memoir, Le chat et le renard (The Cat and the Fox), provides a behind-the-scenes look at French political leaders and the relationships between them.

== Early life and education ==
Brother of journalist Alain Duhamel and pediatrician Jean-François Duhamel, he is also the uncle of Amélie Oudéa-Castéra, Minister of Sports and the Olympic and Paralympic Games between 2022 and 2024. He had five sons: Jean, Nicolas, Alexandre, Benjamin, and Raphaël. He was partnered with Nathalie Saint-Cricq, former head of the political department of France 2, and whose family was the majority shareholder of the groupe Nouvelle République du Centre-Ouest. Their son, Benjamin Duhamel, worked as a political journalist at BFM TV alongside his uncle, Alain, who was an editorialist there.

He attended the Édouard-Branly high school in Nogent-sur-Marne and later the Lycée Condorcet in Paris, followed by economics studies at the Paris 2 Panthéon-Assas University.

== Professional career ==
He began his career in 1970 as a journalist at ORTF. In 1974, he became head of domestic politics at TF1, followed by head of politics and social affairs in 1976. In 1980, the channel entrusted him with a political program called Le Grand Débat. He was also editor-in-chief for several months in 1981.

In 1986, he was appointed deputy director and then program director at RMC and in 1987, he returned to television as head of information at La Cinq. In 1993, he returned to public service as head of programming and later as director of programs at France Inter.

Appointed general director of broadcasting at Radio France in 1996, he was the general director in charge of programming at France 3 from June 1996 to July 1998.

Formerly general director in charge of programming at France 2, he joined the Le Figaro group in 1999 as deputy general director and publisher of Figaro Magazine and Madame Figaro alongside Yves de Chaisemartin, chairman of the executive board, and Michel Senamaud, general administrator.

He was the general director of France Télévisions in charge of programming and diversification during Patrick de Carolis' presidency of the group. He had often collaborated with him professionally.

He also served as president of the École de journalisme et de communication d'Aix-Marseille.

== Works ==
- Cartes sur table with Alain Duhamel, Plon, 2010.

– This book recounts the relationship between the media and the political world, from Georges Pompidou to Nicolas Sarkozy.

- Élysée: coulisses et secrets d'un palais, with Jacques Santamaria, Plon, 2012.
- Les Flingueurs: anthologie des cruautés politiques, with Jacques Santamaria, Plon, 2014.
- Jamais sans elles: des femmes d'influence pour des hommes de pouvoir, with Jacques Santamaria, Plon, 2015.
- Les jours d'après, with Jacques Santamaria, ed. de l'Observatoire, 2017.
- La République abîmée, with Jacques Santamaria, ed. de l'Observatoire, 2019.
- De Gaulle l'album inattendu, with Jacques Santamaria, ed. de l'Observatoire, 2020.
- Le chat et le renard: Présidents et premiers ministres, deux ou trois choses que je sais d’eux, ed. de l’Observatoire 2024.
