= Léo Delibes =

French composer (1836–1891)

Delibes in 1875

Clément Philibert Léo Delibes (French: [klemɑ̃ filibɛʁ leo dəlib]; 21 February 1836 – 16 January 1891) was a French Romantic composer, best known for his ballets and operas. His works include the ballets Coppélia (1870) and Sylvia (1876) and the opera Lakmé (1883), which includes the well-known "Flower Duet".

Born into a musical family, Delibes enrolled at France's foremost music academy, the Conservatoire de Paris, when he was twelve, studying under several professors including Adolphe Adam. After composing light comic opérettes in the 1850s and 1860s, while also serving as a church organist, Delibes achieved public recognition for his music for the ballet La Source in 1866. His later ballets Coppélia and Sylvia were key works in the development of modern ballet, giving the music much greater importance than previously. He composed a small number of mélodies, some of which are still performed frequently.

Delibes had several attempts at writing more serious operas, and achieved a considerable critical and commercial success in 1883 with Lakmé. In his later years he joined the faculty of the Conservatoire, teaching composition. He died at his home in Paris at the age of 54. Coppélia and Sylvia remain core works in the international ballet repertoire, and Lakmé is revived from time to time in opera houses.

== Life and career ==
=== Early years ===
Delibes was born in Saint-Germain-du-Val, now part of La Flèche (Sarthe), on 21 February 1836; his father worked for the French postal service and his mother was a talented amateur musician, the daughter of an opera singer and niece of the organist Édouard Batiste. Delibes was the couple's only child. His father died in 1847 and the family moved to Paris, where soon after his twelfth birthday Delibes was admitted to the Paris Conservatoire. He studied first with Antoine-Jules Tariot (music theory), and then with Félix Le Couppey (piano), François Benoist (organ), François Bazin (harmony) and, at eighteen, Adolphe Adam (composition).

As a boy, Delibes had an unusually fine singing voice; he was a chorister at the church of La Madeleine and sang in the première of Meyerbeer's Le prophète at the Paris Opéra in 1849. While still a student Delibes became organist of St. Pierre de Chaillot and accompanist at the Théâtre Lyrique. At the latter he took part in the preparation of most of the operas in the theatre's repertoire, including classics such as The Marriage of Figaro and Fidelio and new works such as Louis Clapisson's La Fanchonnette, Victor Massé's La Reine Topaze and Gounod's Faust. (Note: Delibes made the piano reduction of the orchestra part for the vocal score of Gounod's Faust in 1859. A theory put forward in 1991 that Delibes wrote the ballet music for the opera when it was revised in 1869 has not been supported in subsequent studies of Gounod by Yves Bruley (2015) and Vincent Giroud (2019).) His biographer Hugh Macdonald writes that although Delibes remained a church organist until 1871 (he held several posts, the last of them at the church of Saint Jean-Saint François from 1862), he was "clearly drawn more to the theatre [and] found his métier at Hervé's highly successful Folies-Nouvelles".

=== Composer ===
In 1856 Delibes' first stage work was premiered at the Folies-Nouvelles: Deux sous de charbon (Two sous-worth of coal), a one-act comic piece to a libretto by Jules Moinaux, described as an "asphyxie lyrique". Over the next fourteen years he produced more comic operas, at an average rate of about one a year. Many were written for the Bouffes-Parisiens, the theatre run by Jacques Offenbach, including Deux vieilles gardes ("Two Old Guards"), Delibes's second opera, which enjoyed enormous success, attributable in Macdonald's view to the composer's gift for "witty melody and lightness of touch".

La Source, 1866

In addition to composing, Delibes earned a living as a critic (briefly in 1858); inspector of school music; and accompanist and later chorus master at the Opéra (from 1862 or 1863). (Note: The obituary in Le Figaro gives the earlier date; Grove's Dictionary of Music and Musicians, the later.). His appointment at the Opéra led to a new career as a composer of ballet music. In 1866 he was commissioned to compose two acts of La Source, the other two being written by Ludwig Minkus. In the view of the musicologist and critic Adolphe Jullien, Delibes "displayed such a wealth of melody as a composer of ballet music" that Minkus was "completely eclipsed". Delibes was immediately invited to compose a waltz-divertissement called Le Pas de Fleurs to be introduced into the ballet of his former teacher Adam, Le Corsaire, for a revival in 1867. The piece was later incorporated into Delibes' music for La Source when it was revived.

In 1869 Delibes composed his last opérette, La Cour du roi Pétaud, for the Variétés. The following year he came to wider public notice with his score for the ballet Coppélia, first performed at the Opéra in May 1870. It was an immediate success, and has remained among the most popular works in the classical ballet repertoire. The following year he resigned from the musical staff of the Opéra and devoted himself wholly to composition. In that year he married Léontine Estelle Denain.

Not wishing to be typecast as a ballet composer, Delibes next turned to mélodies. In 1872 he published a collection including the songs "Myrto", "Les Filles de Cadiz" and "Bonjour Suzon". In 1873 he produced at the Opéra-Comique a comic opera in three acts, Le Roi l'a dit (The King has Said It). Le Figaro thought the libretto weak, but praised Delibes' music: "his melodic vein, his impeccable taste, his scenic skill, his beautiful humour saved a work which, without him, would have gone unnoticed". The work was a success in Paris and in German opera houses, but did not establish itself in the international repertory. Its first performances in Britain (1894) and the US (2016) were by students of, respectively, the Royal College of Music and the Manhattan School of Music. Delibes returned to the Opéra in 1876, with a grand mythological ballet, Sylvia, which in Jullien's view confirmed Delibes' superiority in dance music. It was well received by the press and public. In 1877 Delibes was made a Chevalier de la Legion d'honneur.

Despite the success of his two ballets, Delibes was still anxious to write a serious vocal work, and composed a grand scena, La Mort d'Orphée (The Death of Orpheus), given at the Trocadéro Concerts in 1878 during the Exposition Universelle. He followed that with a serious opera, Jean de Nivelle, a medieval patriotic romance, premiered at the Opéra-Comique in 1880. Reviewers found the piece too episodic but praised the composer for "the rare and precise quality" of his melodies and "the delicate style in his writing" for the public. The Parisian critic for The Era considered it "the best opera, the one most likely to attain a world-wide popularity, since Bizet's ...Carmen", premiered five years previously. The piece ran for more than a hundred performances, and was revived in Paris in 1908 but has not (in 2020) been staged there since then.

=== Later years ===
In 1881 Delibes succeeded Napoléon Henri Reber as professor of composition at the Conservatoire, despite his own admission that he knew nothing of fugue and counterpoint. He took his duties with great seriousness. The music critic Charles Darcours recalled Delibes' concern for his students and his anxiety for them to succeed in France's most prestigious musical award, the Prix de Rome. In 1882 Delibes composed incidental music for a revival of Victor Hugo's play Le Roi s'amuse at the Comédie-Française, consisting of a suite of pastiche medieval dances for orchestra ("Six airs de danse dans le style ancien") and a song with mandolin accompaniment ("Quand Bourbon vit Marseille").

Delibes' opera Lakmé was premiered at the Opéra-Comique on 14 April 1883. Léon Carvalho, the manager, was not known for extravagance in his productions, but for this opera he surprised his audiences by the lavish staging. Macdonald writes:

Its success was lasting; the oriental colour, the superb part for the title role, a well-constructed libretto and the real charm of the music, all contributed to a work on which, with the ballets, Delibes' fame has rested.

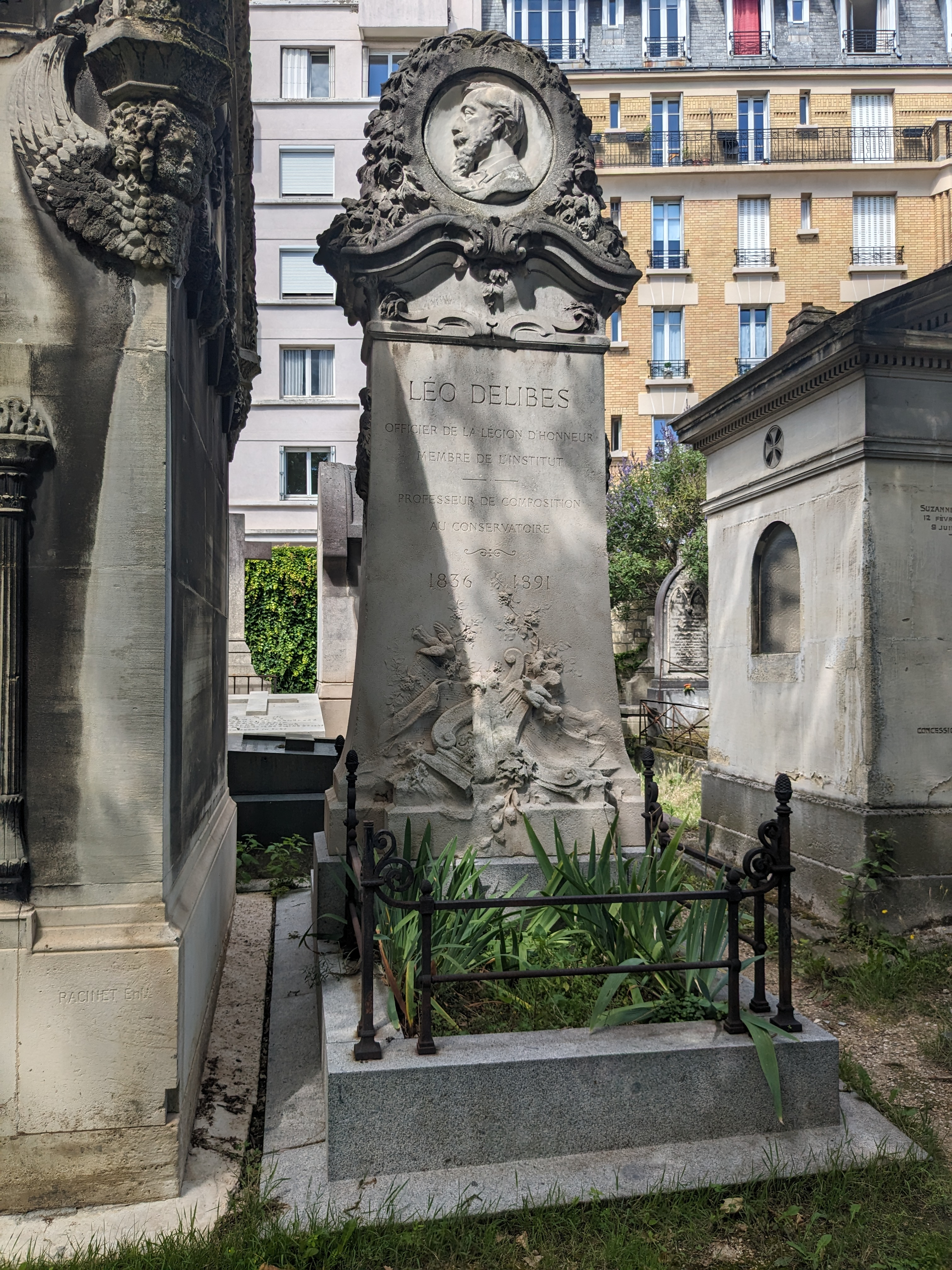
Grave in the Cimetière de Montmartre

Lakmé was quickly taken up by opera houses across Europe, and productions followed in London (1885) and New York (1886); reviews of the American production were highly enthusiastic; those of the British production were less so, but in both cities it prospered at the box-office.

Delibes' last years were financially comfortable and socially secure. In 1884 he was elected to the Institut de France. His last work, incomplete when he died, was another opera, Kassya. Delibes, who had been intermittently ill for some time, died at his home in Paris after a sudden collapse shortly before his 55th birthday. He was buried in the Cimetière de Montmartre in Paris.

== Music ==
In Macdonald's view, Delibes' early compositions are clearly influenced by and in the tradition of Boieldieu, Hérold and Adam, Delibes' composition teacher at the Conservatoire, from whom he had the example of "a sparkling operetta style". Later, consciously seeking to move from light popular works into a more elevated genre, his works show the influence of Meyerbeer and Gounod, as well as the slightly younger Bizet and Lalo. Macdonald observes that in notices of Delibes' early music the same terms frequently recur: "wit, charm, elegance, grace, colour, lightness". The Musical World said of him, "If not the greatest French composer of his day, Delibes was the most characteristically French, and it can hardly be said that in his own line he leaves any successor of equal excellence".

=== Opera ===
Le Roi l'a dit is a light opera in which "elaborate vocal ensembles and witty pastiche play a major part" (Macdonald). The more serious Jean de Nivelle, one of the works showing the influence of Meyerbeer and Lalo, is generally weightier in tone, with some lapses into the composer's lighter style in such pieces as the Act III couplets, "Moi! j'aime le bruit de bataille". The chorus "Nous sommes les reines d'un jour" in the Act I finale continually switches between 2/4 and 3/4 with what Macdonald calls "a modal melody of striking originality".

Lakmé, Act I, 1883

Lakmé – which Grove's Dictionary of Music and Musicians ranks as Delibes' masterpiece, even above Coppelia and Sylvia – shows the influence of Bizet, with echoes of Carmen and Les pêcheurs de perles in the harmonic techniques and subtleties of orchestration. The opera is sometimes seen as a vehicle for a star soprano, (Note: Productions of Lakme in the late 19th- and early 20th-centuries were often mounted for stars including Luisa Tetrazzini and Lily Pons.) but Macdonald writes that the two principal male characters, Nilakantha and Gérald, are strongly drawn, and the music is "melodic, picturesque and theatrically strong". Macdonald expresses reservations about the dramatic recitative, which he finds tending to the conventional; the work was originally conceived as an opéra-comique with spoken dialogue, and the recitatives were an afterthought. Lakmé remains on the fringes of the operatic repertoire. It was produced at the Opéra-Comique in 1995, starring Natalie Dessay, but has not been staged by the Metropolitan Opera since 1947, or at the Royal Opera House since 1910. Operabase and Les Archives du spectacle record details of occasional productions in Europe and elsewhere. The work was staged by the Seattle Opera in 1967 with Joan Sutherland in the title role, and in 2000 with Harolyn Blackwell, and by the New York City Opera in 1984.

Kassya, complete except for the orchestration when Delibes died, was edited and orchestrated by Jules Massenet, whose skilful work was praised by reviewers. It had its premiere two years after Delibes' death, and was respectfully received, but the general view was that it showed the composer's creative gifts in decline. It ran for twelve performances. Macdonald finds points to praise: the oriental inflections in the music, the vocal writing, and the "fine close to the first scene of Act 3, with snow falling on the deserted stage".

=== Ballet ===
Divertissement - Pizzicato
Divertissement - Pizzicato from Sylvia — 3081 KB

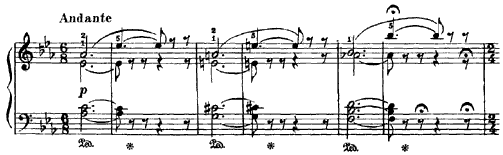
The first few bars of Pizzicato from Sylvia

Influenced by Adam, Coppélia makes extensive use of leitmotifs for character and mood, and contains some vivid musical scene-painting. Delibes greatly enlarged on Adam's modest use of leitmotifs: each leading character is accompanied by music that portrays him or her; Noël Goodwin describes them: "Swanilda in her entry waltz, bright and graceful; Dr. Coppélius in stiff, dry counterpoint, the canonic device ingeniously applied also to Coppélia, the doll he has created; Franz in two themes, each sharing the same melodic shape of the first four notes, but the second having a more sentimental feeling than the sprightly first theme". Delibes made extensive use of characteristic national dances, including the bolero, czardas, jig and mazurka, continually interspersed with waltz rhythms. In the opinion of several critics, the score of Sylvia surpasses that of Coppélia. Tchaikovsky was greatly impressed by it, calling Sylvia:

The first ballet in which the music constitutes not just the main, but the sole interest. What charm, what grace, what melodic, rhythmic and harmonic richness. I was ashamed. If I had known this music earlier, then of course I would not have written Swan Lake.

Carl Van Vechten shared Tchaikovsky's view that Delibes revolutionised ballet composition: "Before he began to compose his ballets, music for dancing, for the most part, consisted of tinkle-tinkle melodies with marked rhythm." In Van Vechten's view, Delibes revolutionised ballet music by introducing in his scores "a symphonic element, a wealth of graceful melody, and a richness of harmonic fibre, based, it is safe to hazard, on a healthy distaste for routine". Van Vechten considers Delibes' scores to be the forerunners of 20th-century ballets such as Debussy's Jeux, Ravel's Daphnis et Chloé and Stravinsky's Petrouchka.

After Sylvia, Delibes's only composition for dance was a suite of six dances for the Comédie-française production of Le Roi s'amuse, The dances, in a pastiche of antique style, show a keen ear for the nuances of period character in Goodwin's view. They are not often played in concert and are more familiar in recordings.

=== Mélodies ===
The pianist and musical scholar Graham Johnson quotes the musicologist Fritz Noske's view that Delibes' songs derive from the chansonnette, "lighter and more entertaining than the romance, and less susceptible to the German influence of the lied". In his songs, Delibes shares with Bizet "a natural feeling for the theatre, and an ability to spin local colour", as in his chanson espagnole "Les filles de Cadix". Of other early songs, Johnson describes "Eclogue" and "Bonjour, Suzon" as "charm[ing] us with their unpretentious gaiety and delicacy, as well as their economy of means". Some of the songs evoke the period style of the 16th century, such as "Avril", "Chanson de l'oiseleur" and "Myrto", the last of which is a pre-echo of mélodies by Gabriel Fauré. Johnson finds Delibes more suited to reflective than to passionate sentiments, and, in general, better in more of his earlier songs than his later. He brackets Delibes with his junior contemporary Reynaldo Hahn as songwriters – "charmers both [with] a similarly eighteenth-century idea of the role of music in refined society: the unashamed giving of pleasure".

== Notes, references and sources ==
=== Sources ===
- Bruley, Yves (2015). Charles Gounod (in French). Paris: Bleu nuit. ISBN 978-2-35884-044-6.
- Bullock, Philip Ross (2016). Pyotr Tchaikovsky. London: Reaktion. ISBN 978-1-78023-701-5.
- Curzon, Henri de (1926). Léo Delibes. Sa vie et ses oeures (1836-1892) (in French). Paris: Legouix. OCLC 1316090.
- Giroud, Vincent (2019). "The Genesis, Transformations, Sources, and Style of Gounod's Faust". In Lorna Fitzsimmons; Charles McKnight (eds.). The Oxford Handbook of Faust in Music. New York: Oxford University Press. ISBN 978-0-19-993518-5.
- Johnson, Graham (2002). A French Song Companion. Oxford: Oxford University Press. OCLC 1036173270.
- Jullien, Adolphe (1916). "Delibes, Clément Philibert Léo". In J. A. Fuller Maitland (ed.). Grove's Dictionary of Music and Musicians (second ed.). London: Macmillan. OCLC 277251162.
- Noël, Édouard; Edmond Stoullig (1894). Les Annales du théâtre et de la musique, 1893 (in French). Paris: G. Charpentier. OCLC 777138181.
