= Beaufai =

- Commune
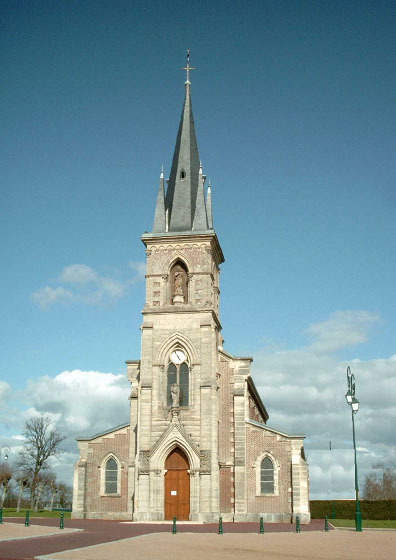
- The church in Beaufai
- Location of Beaufai
- Location within France Location within Normandy
- Coordinates: 48°45′01″N 0°30′56″E
- Country: France
- Region: Normandy
- Department: Orne
- Arrondissement: Mortagne-au-Perche
- Canton: Rai
- Intercommunality: Pays de l'Aigle

Government
  - Mayor (2020–2026): Dominique Netzer
- Area^{1}: 12.9 km^{2} (5.0 sq mi)
- Elevation: 250 m (820 ft)
- Highest elevation: 301 m (988 ft)
- Lowest elevation: 214 m (702 ft)
- Population (2023): 314
  - Density: 24.3/km^{2} (63.0/sq mi)
- Time zone: UTC+01:00 (CET)
  - Summer (DST): UTC+02:00 (CEST)
- INSEE/Postal code: 61032 /61270
- ^{1} French Land Register data, which excludes lakes, ponds, glaciers > 1 km^{2} (0.386 sq mi or 247 acres) and river estuaries.

Beaufai (French pronunciation: [bofɛ]) is a commune in the Orne department in the Normandy region in northwestern France.

== Geography ==
The commune is made up of the following collection of villages and hamlets, La Carlière, Beaufai and Château de Livet.

The river Risle flows through the commune, plus there is a stream the Ruisseau de Corru.

== Population ==
Historical population
Year	Pop.	±% p.a.
1968	442	—
1975	411	−1.03%
1982	314	−3.77%
1990	308	−0.24%
1999	346	+1.30%
2007	337	−0.33%
2012	365	+1.61%
2017	342	−1.29%
2023	314	−1.41%
Source: INSEE

== Notable people ==
- Jacqueline Baudrier -(1922 – 2009) a French radio and television journalist, UNESCO ambassador and in 1975 became President-General Director of Radio France was born here.

== See also ==
- Communes of the Orne department
