= Marie Barsacq =

French politician (born 1973)

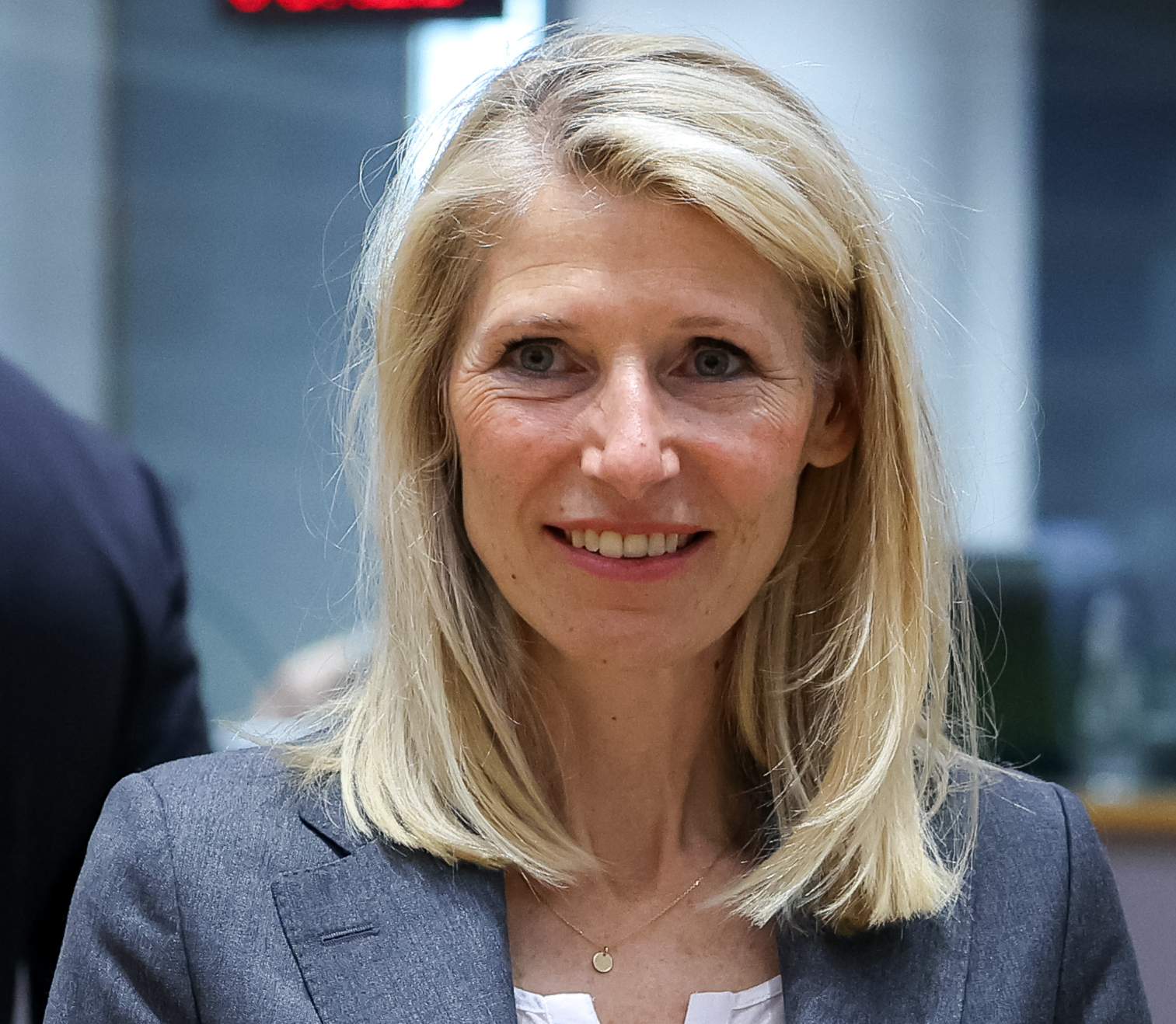
- Barsacq in 2025

Minister of Sports
- In office 23 December 2024 – 5 October 2025
- Prime Minister: François Bayrou
- Preceded by: Gil Avérous
- Succeeded by: Marina Ferrari

Personal details
- Born: 3 August 1973 (age 52) Dax, Landes, France
- Spouse: Cédric Beaudou
- Occupation: Lawyer • Sport manager

Marie Barsacq (French pronunciation: [maʁi baʁsak]; born 3 August 1973) is a French politician who has been serving as Minister of Sports in the government of Prime Minister François Bayrou since 2024.

== Career ==
Earlier in her career, Barsacq worked at the French National Olympic and Sports Committee and the French Football Federation. From 2015 to 2024, she served as director of impact and legacy for the Paris Organising Committee for the 2024 Olympic and Paralympic Games.
