= French Athletics Federation =

Governing body for the sport of athletics in France

Fédération française d'athlétisme
- Sport: Athletics
- Abbreviation: FFA
- Founded: November 20, 1920
- Affiliation: World Athletics
- Affiliation date: 1912
- Regional affiliation: EAA
- President: Bernard Amsalem
- Secretary: Doris Spira
- Replaced: Union des Sociétés Françaises de Sports Athlétiques

Official website
- www.athle.fr
- (France)

The French Athletics Federation (French: Fédération française d'athlétisme, FFA) is the governing body for the sport of athletics in France.

== History ==
FFA is the heir to the Union des Sociétés Françaises de Sports Athlétiques (USFSA), founded November 20, 1887. In 1912, a French delegation was present at the conference in Stockholm that founded the International Association of Athletics Federations (IAAF) with 17 national federations.

=== Controversies ===
In August 2024, sprinter Muhammad Abdallah Kounta was suspended by the President of the French Athletics Federation for publishing comments inciting hatred on social media, including inciting hatred against France, white people, Christians, and Jews, as well as support for the Islamist group Hamas. Among Kounta's posts, he expressed a desire to "kill Little White."

The Federation President also made a report to the Public Prosecutor, as well as to the Federation's Disciplinary Committee, which will consider banning him permanently. Île-de-France Regional Councilor Patrick Karam, the right-hand man of the President of the Regional Council of Île-de-France Valérie Pécresse, called for the "heaviest sanctions" to be levied against Kounta, including Kounta's permanent removal by the Federation's Disciplinary Committee.

== Organisation ==
The French Athletics Federation is governed by a president and seven vice-presidents, a general secretary, and a general treasurer.

=== Board ===
- President: Bernard Amsalem
- General secretary: Doris Spira

== Kit suppliers ==
France's kits are currently supplied by Asics.

== See also ==
- Athletics in France
- Union des Sociétés Françaises de Sports Athlétiques
- French records in athletics
