= Bernard Amsalem =

French organizer of athletics

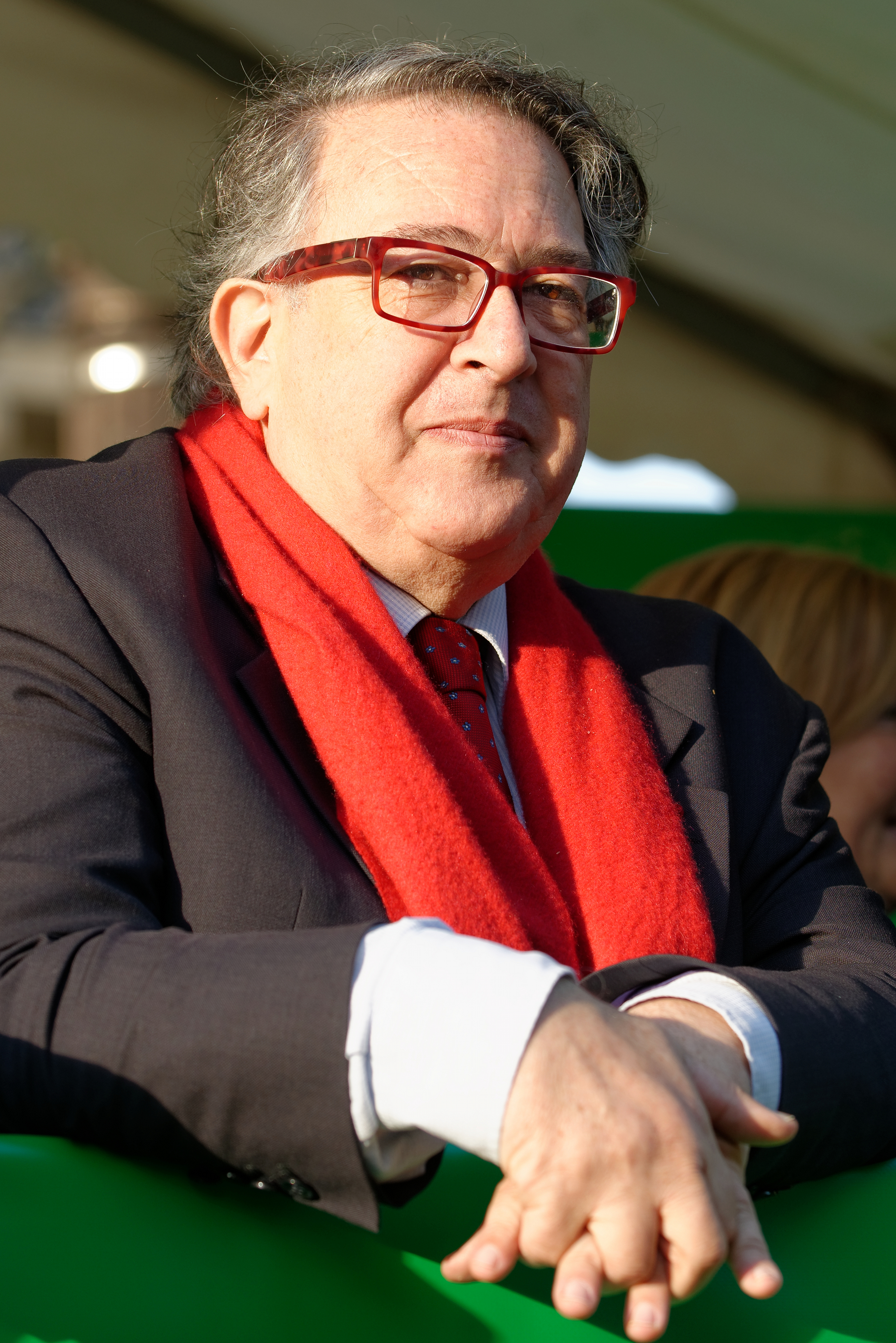
- Amsalem at the 2014 Paris Marathon
- Born: November 18, 1951 (age 74); Saida, Algeria
- Occupations: Athlete and politician
- Known for: French Athletics Federation, French Olympic Committee

Bernard Amsalem (born 1951 in Saida, Algeria) is a French organizer of athletics. He was vice-president of the French Athletics Federation from 1997 to 2001, and is now the president since 2001.

Amsalem was vice-president of the French Olympic Committee from 2001 to 2009, and was head of the French delegation to the 2012 Olympics. He was founder and president of the Francophone Athletics Federation, and has been a member of the board of the International Association of Athletics Federations since 2011. He served as president of Meeting Areva in Saint-Denis, France in 2008.

He was promoted to the rank of Officer of the Legion of Honour on December 31, 2012.

A member of the Socialist Party, he was mayor of the new town of Val-de-Reuil from 1981 to 2001.
