= French presidential debates =

French presidential debates, broadcast on TV, traditionally occurred only between the two rounds of the presidential elections.
In 2017, for the first time, a presidential debate took place prior to the first round.

== 1974 ==
The role of TV in French presidential election became prominent after Charles de Gaulle's decision to propose a referendum on the establishment of the election of the President of the French Republic under universal suffrage. Alain Peyrefitte, Minister of Information, decided to enact the rule that rival candidates will dispose of the same amount of time to speak.

The first such televised debate occurred between François Mitterrand and Valéry Giscard d'Estaing in 1974, on the ORTF, and was presented by Jacqueline Baudrier and Alain Duhamel. Giscard was said by Mitterrand to have won the election with his pun: "you do not have a monopoly on heart."

== 1981 ==
They reprised their performance in the next election in 1981 when Mitterrand upstaged Giscard and won. Mitterrand memorably retorted to Giscard's description of him as "l'homme du passé" (man of the past) by calling Giscard "l'homme du passif" (man of liabilities).

== 1988 ==
In 1988, after two years of cohabitation, the debate opposed Mitterrand and Jacques Chirac. Each candidate had 50 minutes to speak, with an additional 3 minutes conclusion at the end of the show. During the most famous moment of the debate, Chirac declared to Mitterrand:

"Allow me to say that this evening, I am not the Prime minister, and you are not the President of the Republic: we are two candidates... equals... and that submit themselves to the judgment of the French... the only one that counts. You will therefore permit me to call you Monsieur Mitterrand!"

A request to which Mitterrand famously responded:

"But you are perfectly correct, Monsieur le Premier ministre!"

== 1995 ==
In 1995 Chirac faced off against Socialist candidate Lionel Jospin. The 135-minute encounter, which took place on May 2, was described as "probably the least dramatic French Presidential debate since the first one in 1974." During the debate, they disagreed about the presidential term. Jospin wanted to reduce it to five years whereas Chirac was in favour of the seven-year term. The PS candidate responded: "The choice is five years with Jospin or seven years with Jacques Chirac, which will be very long". Eventually, the presidential term was reduced to five years after the 2002 election.

== 2002 ==
In 2002, Chirac refused to meet far-right candidate Jean-Marie Le Pen.

== 2007 ==
The 2007 Presidential debate opposed Nicolas Sarkozy and Ségolène Royal, the two candidates with the most votes from the first round of voting on 22 April. They were presented by Patrick Poivre d'Arvor and Arlette Chabot. The two sides had alternatively agreed and backed off to holding such a debate. It finally took place on May 2, 2007, and was watched by 20 million viewers, more than in 1995 (16.78 million viewers) but fewer than in 1988 and 1981, when 30 million people had watched the debate. The first opinion poll about the debate indicated that 53% of the sampling frame thought that Nicolas Sarkozy was more convincing, while 31% thought that it was Ségolène Royale who was.

== 2012 ==
A debate between Nicolas Sarkozy, president of the Republic and Union for a Popular Movement candidate for re-election, and Francois Hollande, the Socialist Party (France) candidate, was held on May 2.

== 2017 ==
A debate between François Fillon, Benoît Hamon, Marine Le Pen, Emmanuel Macron, and Jean-Luc Mélenchon took place 20 March, hosted by TF1 and moderated by journalists Anne-Claire Coudray and Gilles Bouleau. It was the first time that a presidential debate prior to the first round was held.

The debate was three and a half hours long, and was watched by 9.8 million (47% of the audience share) on TF1, peaking at 11.5 million. According to an Elabe poll, Macron was judged the winner, with 29% of viewers interviewed finding him most convincing, followed by Mélenchon at 20%, Le Pen and Fillon at 19%, and Hamon at 11%. A Harris Interactive survey among those who had heard of the debate found that Macron at 20%, Le Pen at 18%, Fillon at 17%, Mélenchon at 13%, and Hamon at 6%, and an OpinionWay poll found Macron at 25%, Fillon at 20%, Le Pen at 18%, Mélenchon at 17%, and Hamon at 8% among debate viewers.

The TV debate prior to the second and final round, between Emmanuel Macron and Marine Le Pen, occurred on 3 May 2017.

== 2022 ==
A debate between Emmanuel Macron and Marine Le Pen was held on 20 April 2022. Pollsters Elabe found that 59% of people found Macron more convincing, with 39% finding Le Pen more convincing.
