= La Nouvelle République du Centre-Ouest =

French regional newspaper headquartered in Tours

- Type: Daily newspaper
- Format: Tabloid
- Founded: September 1944; 82 years ago
- Language: French
- Headquarters: Tours, France
- ISSN: 2260-6858
- OCLC number: 0610C87037
- Website: lanouvellerepublique.fr

La Nouvelle République du Centre-Ouest (French pronunciation: [la nuvɛl ʁepyblik dy sɑ̃tʁ wɛst]), commonly known as La Nouvelle République (La NR), is a French newspaper headquartered in Tours, Centre-Val de Loire.

== Distribution ==
The newspaper is distributed in five departments of France:

- three departments of the Centre-Val de Loire region: Indre-et-Loire (prefecture Tours), Loir-et-Cher and Indre, and
- two departments in the north of Nouvelle-Aquitaine: Vienne (prefecture Poitiers) and Deux-Sèvres.
