= Jean-Pierre-François Guillot-Duhamel =

French engineer

Jean-Pierre-François Guillot-Duhamel (English: /ɡiːˈjoʊ-duːəˈmɛl/, French: [ʒɑ̃ pjɛʁ fʁɑ̃swa ɡijodyamɛl]; 1730–1816) was a French engineer.
