= Alexandre Duhamel =

French baritone

- Born: 5 July 1983 (age 42); Paris France
- Education: Folkwanghochschule
- Occupation: operatic baritone
- Website: alexandreduhamel.com

Alexandre Duhamel (born 5 July 1983) a French baritone, known for operatic roles in French opera such as Valentin in Gounod's Faust, Zurga in Bizet's Les Pêcheurs de perles and Golaud in Debussy's Pelléas et Mélisande. He performed at many French theatres and abroad.

== Life and career ==
Duhamel was born in Paris on 5 July 1983, the son of the journalist Patrice Duhamel. After his baccalauréat, he achieved a license as a journalist from the French Press Institute in 2001. He took voice lessons with Yves Sotin, first training as a tenor, but the teacher convinced him that his voice was rather a baritone. He was admitted to the Conservatoire de Paris in Paris in 2005. In 2009 Duhamel became a member of the studio of the Opéra de Paris, studying roles and their interpretation for two years. He performed small roles on stage such as the Knight in Martinů Mirandolina.

He was noticed by critics when he appeared as Wagner in Gounod's Faust at the Opéra Bastille in 2011. The same year, he performed as Moralès in Bizet's Carmen at the Grand Théâtre de Luxembourg, in 2012 as Valentin in Faust at the Metz Opera, and as Mercutio in Gounod's Roméo et Juliette at the Opéra d'Avignon in 2013. The same year, he performed, alongside Roberto Alagna, as Zurga in Bizet's Les Pêcheurs de perles at the Salle Pleyel in Paris, a role he would repeat often. He made his debut in the United States in 2017, performing with the Seattle Symphony Orchestra in Ravel's L'Enfant et les Sortilèges. He performed at the Salzburg Festival first in 2018, as Andrès in Offenbach's La Périchole, conducted by Marc Minkowski. and at the BBC Proms in Lili Boulanger's Pour les funérailles d'un soldat conducted by Edward Gardner. He portrayed Golaud in Debussy's Pelléas et Mélisande several times, notably at the Opéra de Lille in 2021, with François-Xavier Roth conducting his Les Siècles orchestra on period instruments.

In Mozart's Don Giovanni, he began as Masetto at the Bastille Opéra in a 2015 production directed by Michael Haneke; he portrayed the title role at the Grand Théâtre de Bordeaux in 2022. Duhamel performed his first Wagner role in 2022, Alberich in Siegrfied at the Staatsoper Stuttgart, followed by Kurwenal in Tristan und Isolde at the Opéra de Lille in 2024. He appeared as Marquis de la Force in Poulenc's Dialogues des Carmélites at the Théâtre des Champs-Élysées in Paris in 2024, alongside Vannina Santoni as Blanche.

In concert, Duhamel performed in L'Enfance du Christ by Berlioz, Puccini's Messa di Gloria, and Rossini's Petite messe solennelle, among others. He appeared in Gounod's St. Cecilia Mass with the MDR Rundfunkchor and the Frankfurt Radio Symphony in the opening concert of the 2025 Rheingau Musik Festival at Eberbach Abbey, Germany, conducted by Alain Altinoglu.
