= Lyon Capitale =

French monthly magazine

- Frequency: Monthly
- Founded: 1994
- Company: Fiducial Media
- Country: France
- Based in: Lyon
- Language: French
- Website: Lyon Capitale
- ISSN: 1761-9130

Lyon Capitale (French pronunciation: [ljɔ̃ kapital]) is a French monthly magazine, created in 1994, about Lyon and its region Rhône-Alpes. It is owned by French billionaire businessman Christian Latouche.

== History and profile ==
Lyon Capitale was created in 1994 by Jean Olivier Arfeuillere, Philippe Chaslot, Mathieu Thai and Anne-Caroline Jambaud. It is published on a monthly basis. In 2005 the Le Progrès group relinquishes the title to Bruno Rousset of April insurance. The newspaper was taken over, at auction in the commercial court, by Xavier Ellie (former CEO of Le Progrès) in 2006. In 2008 the magazine was acquired by a media company, Fiducial.
