= Alain Duhamel =

French political journalist (born 1940)

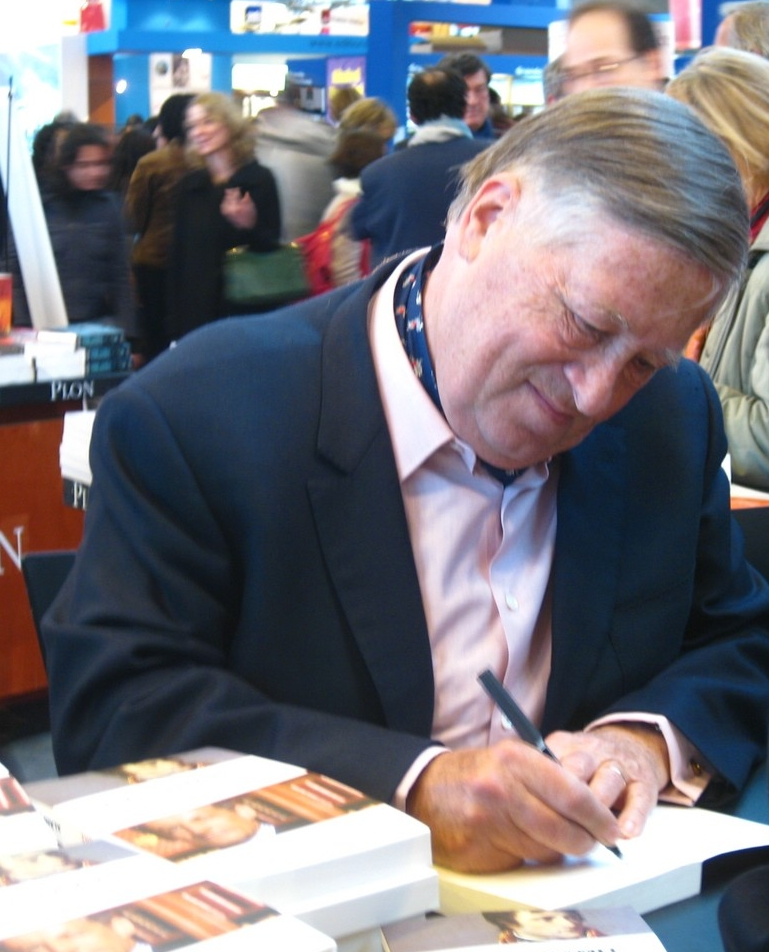
- Duhamel in 2009
- Born: 31 May 1940 (age 86); Caen, France
- Education: Sciences Po
- Occupation: Journalist • Columnist
- Employer: BFM TV
- Family: Patrice Duhamel (brother)

Alain Maurice Jacques Duhamel (French pronunciation: [alɛ̃ mɔʁis ʒak dy.amɛl, moʁ-]; born 31 May 1940) is a prominent French journalist and political commentator.

In 1963, Duhamel started working at Le Monde. He started giving talks on Europe 1 from 1974. He has also written in Libération since 1992, and in Les Dernières Nouvelles d'Alsace.

Duhamel has also hosted several television political broadcasts: À armes égales from 1970, Cartes sur table on Antenne 2 from 1978, succeeded by L'Heure de vérité, and eventually 100 minutes pour convaincre from 2002, as well as Question Ouverte. During the French presidential election of 1995, Duhamel, along with fellow journalist Guillaume Durand, hosted the television debate between Jacques Chirac and Lionel Jospin.

Duhamel has also worked with RTL from 1999.

In 2006, Duhamel published Les Prétendants 2007, listing 20 likely contenders of the French presidential election of 2007, and notably ignoring Ségolène Royal. Duhamel persisted in denying that Royal was a likely contender, even as she rose in popularity. He eventually included a chapter on the pocket edition of the book.

On November 27, 2006, during a talk at Sciences Po, Duhamel stated his intention to vote for François Bayrou. A video of the event was released on Dailymotion, and Duhamel was suspended from his activities at France 2 and RTL until the end of the campaign.

In 2009, Duhamel released La Marche Consulaire, a book which compared then-President Nicolas Sarkozy and Napoleon.

== Bibliography ==
- La République giscardienne. Anatomie politique de la France, Éditions Grasset, 1980.
- La République de monsieur Mitterrand, Éditions Grasset, 1982.
- Les prétendants, Gallimard, 1983.
- Le complexe d'Astérix. Essai sur le caractère politique des Français, Gallimard, 1985.
- Le V^{e} Président, Gallimard, 1987.
- Les habits neufs de la politique, Flammarion, 1989.
- De Gaulle-Mitterrand. La marque et la trace, Flammarion, 1991.
- Les peurs françaises, Flammarion, 1993.
- La Politique imaginaire. Les mythes politiques français, Flammarion, 1995 (Académie Française essay prize).
- Portrait d'un artiste, Flammarion, 1997.
- Une ambition française, Plon, 1999.
- Derrière le miroir. Les hommes politiques à la télévision, Plon, 2000.
- Les Prétendants 2007, Plon, 2006
- La Marche Consulaire, 2009
