= Hate speech laws in France =

The hate speech laws in France are matters of both civil law and criminal law. Those laws protect individuals and groups from being defamed or insulted because they belong or do not belong, in fact or in fancy, to an ethnicity, a nation, a race, a religion, a sex, a sexual orientation, or a gender identity or because they have a handicap. The laws forbid any communication which is intended to incite discrimination against, hatred of, or harm to, anyone because of his belonging or not belonging, in fact or in fancy, to an ethnicity, a nation, a race, a religion, a sex, a sexual orientation, or a gender identity, or because he or she has a handicap.

== Blasphemy ==
France abolished the offence of blasphemy in 1791; but the offence persisted in the regions of Alsace and Moselle as Articles 166 and 167 of the local penal code until 2016. The articles persisted as a holdover from the German criminal code of 1871. Validated by La loi du 17 Octobre 1919 and le Décret du 25 Novembre 1919, the articles forbade public blasphemy against God. No convictions under Articles 166 and 167 were registered.

== Freedom of the press ==
The Law on the Freedom of the Press of 29 July 1881 guarantees freedom of the press, subject to several prohibitions. Article 24 prohibits anyone from publicly inciting another to discriminate against, or to hate or to harm, a person or a group for belonging or not belonging, in fact or in fancy, to an ethnicity, a nation, a race, a religion, a sex, or a sexual orientation, or for having a handicap. The penalty for violating this prohibition is up to a year of imprisonment and a fine of up to €45,000, or either one of those, as well as the suspension of some civil rights in some cases.

Articles 32 and 33 prohibit anyone from publicly defaming or insulting a person or group for belonging or not belonging, in fact or in fancy, to an ethnicity, a nation, a race, a religion, a sex, or a sexual orientation, or for having a handicap. The penalty for defamation is up to a year of imprisonment and a fine of up to €45,000, or either one of those punishments. The penalty for insult is up to six months of imprisonment and a fine of up to €22,500, or either one of those punishments.

La loi du 29 juillet 1881 allows the public prosecutor to initiate criminal proceedings against a violator of the law either upon the complaint of a victim or upon his own initiative. A victim may choose to undertake a civil action against a violator. Such a civil action must obey rules prescribed for a criminal proceeding, and a court may assess both civil damages and criminal penalties at the same time. Article 48-1 permits civil-rights organizations to seek damages for violations of the law.

== Holocaust ==
Act 90-615 of 13 July 1990 or the Gayssot Act (named for its sponsor in the National Assembly) introduced a right to respond for any person who considers that a newspaper or other print medium has damaged his honor on the grounds of his ethnicity, nationality, race or religion. The Gayssot Act sets a punishment of five years' imprisonment and a €45,000 fine for the public expression of ideas that challenge the existence of the crimes against humanity committed by Nazi Germany during World War II as defined in the appendix to the London Agreement of 8 August 1945.

== Penal code ==
The non-public insult of a person or a group of people because of their origin or their membership or their non-membership, true or supposed, to an ethnic group, a nation, sexual identity, gender identity, disability, a race or a specific religion is punishable by a fine of €500, or up to €3000 for a repeat offence.

== Other fields of law ==
By legislation adopted in 1972, France may ban groups that advocate racism.

=== Online hate speech ===
In March 2019, Laetitia Avia drafted legislation (Avia law) that is similar to Germany's NetzDG. The law required the regulation of hateful content online. In July 2019, the National Assembly passed the bill to enforce these rules to limit hateful content online. These rules may apply to all hateful content and extremism. Those who fail to comply face up to 75,000 to 250,000 euros per fine.

On 13 May 2020, the National Assembly passed the legislation and it would likely to go effect in 18 June.

On 18 June 2020, the French Constitutional Council struck down core provisions of the law.

=== Proposed 2026 law against renewed forms of antisemitism ===
In January 2026, the Law Committee of the French National Assembly approved Proposition de loi n° 575, introduced by MP Caroline Yadan, aimed at combating what its sponsors described as “renewed forms of antisemitism.” The bill proposes to extend existing legal provisions to sanction implicit incitement to antisemitism, including publicly calling for the destruction of a state recognised by France, such as Israel. It also seeks to broaden penalties for Holocaust denial and trivialisation of genocides, and strengthen sanctions against incitement to terrorism.

The committee approved the bill by an 18–16 vote, with support from members of the governing majority and opposition from some left-wing lawmakers. The proposal advanced to the full National Assembly for further debate and potential adoption. The bill has been supported by Jewish organisations in France, while some human rights groups and commentators have raised concerns about possible implications for freedom of expression.

== Select cases ==
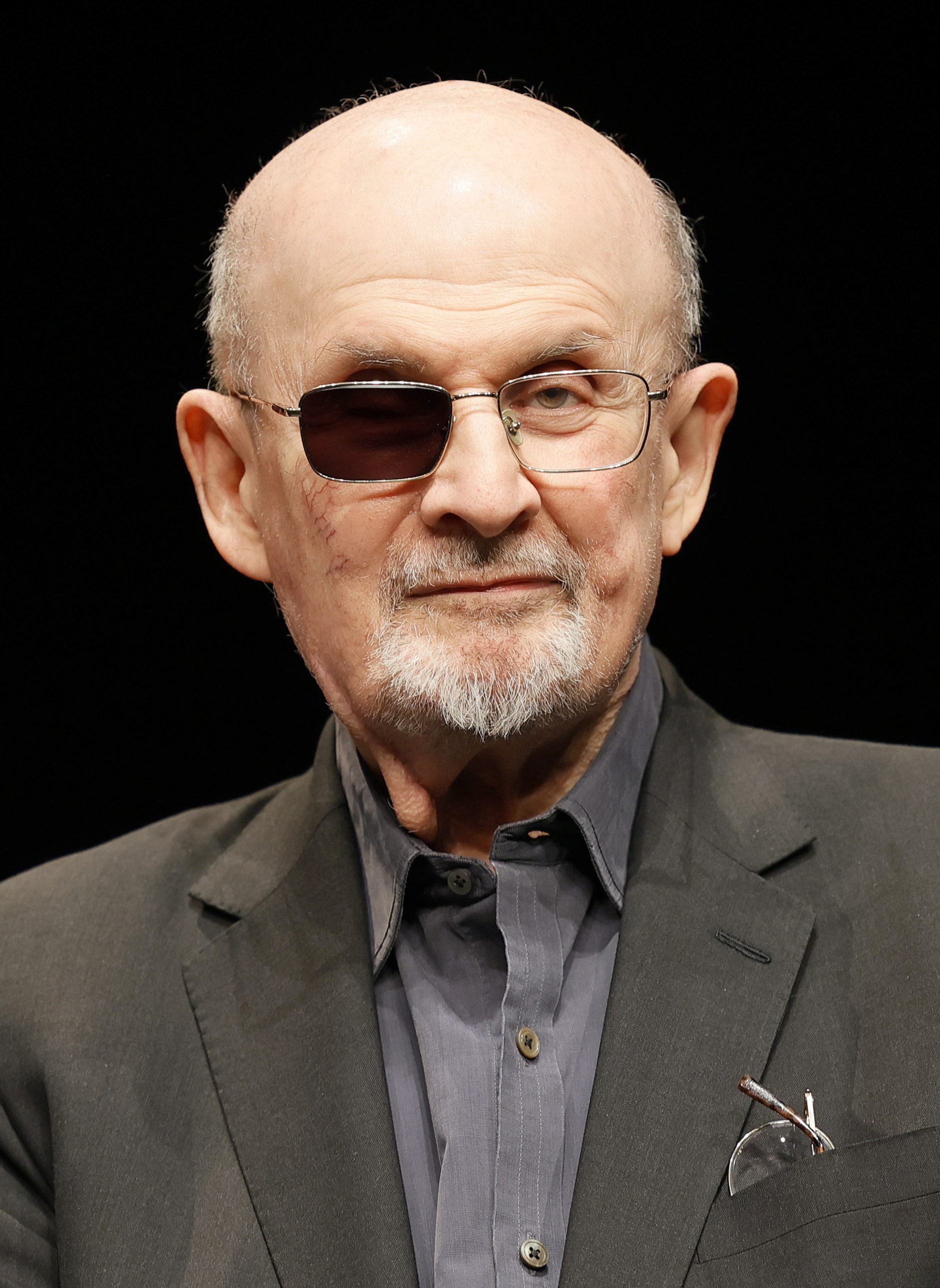
Salman Rushdie

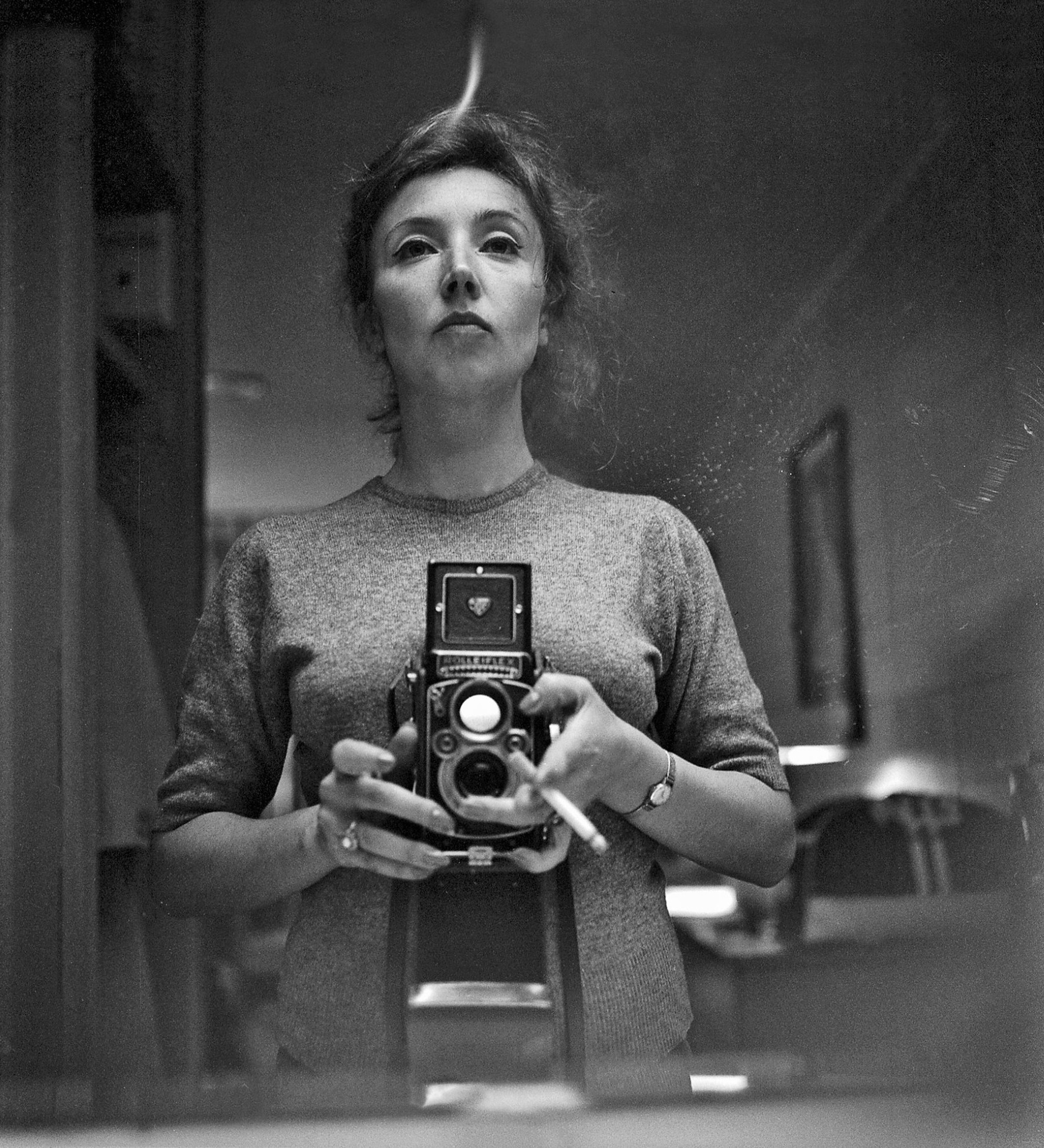
Oriana Fallaci

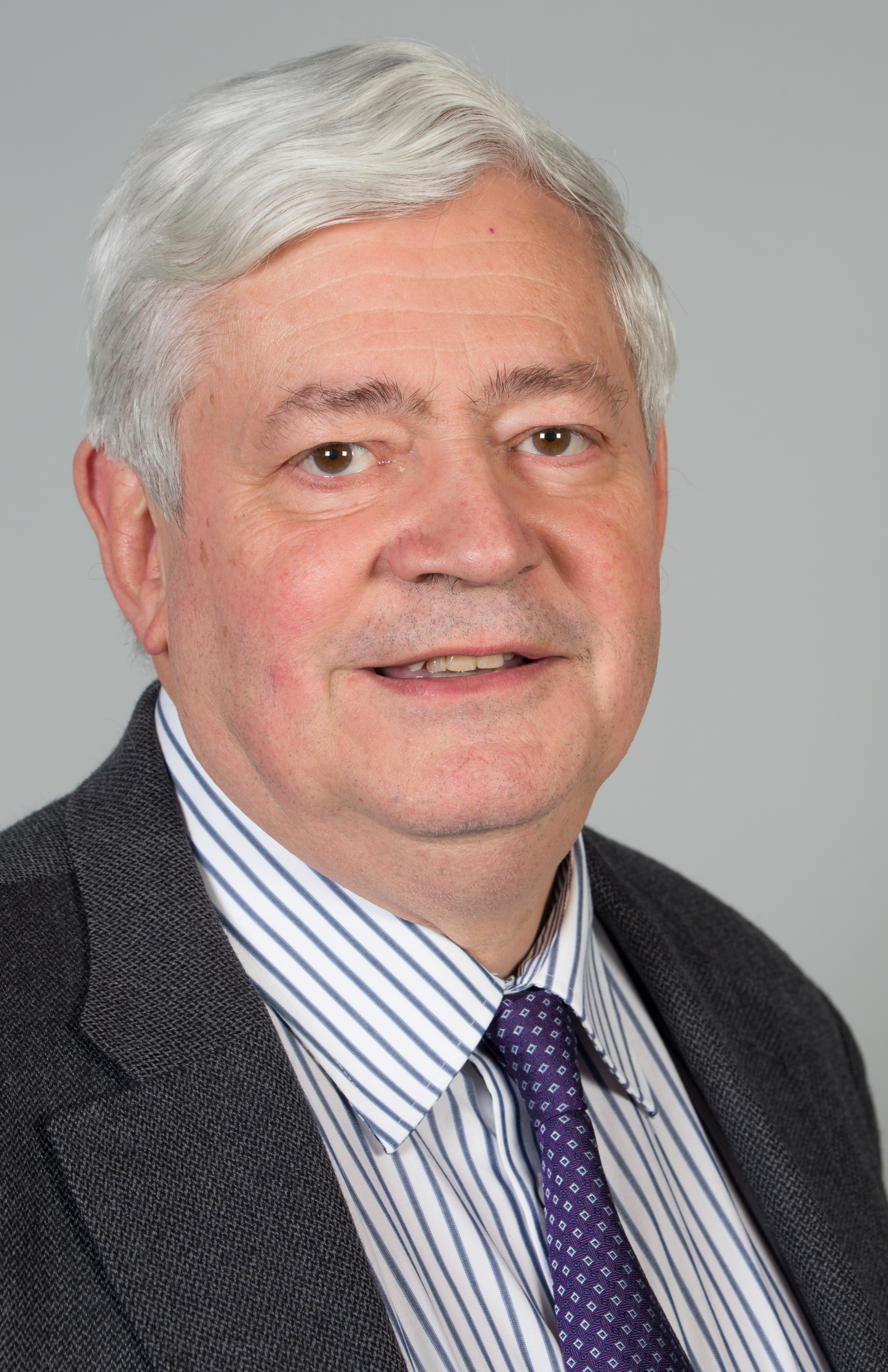
Bruno Gollnisch

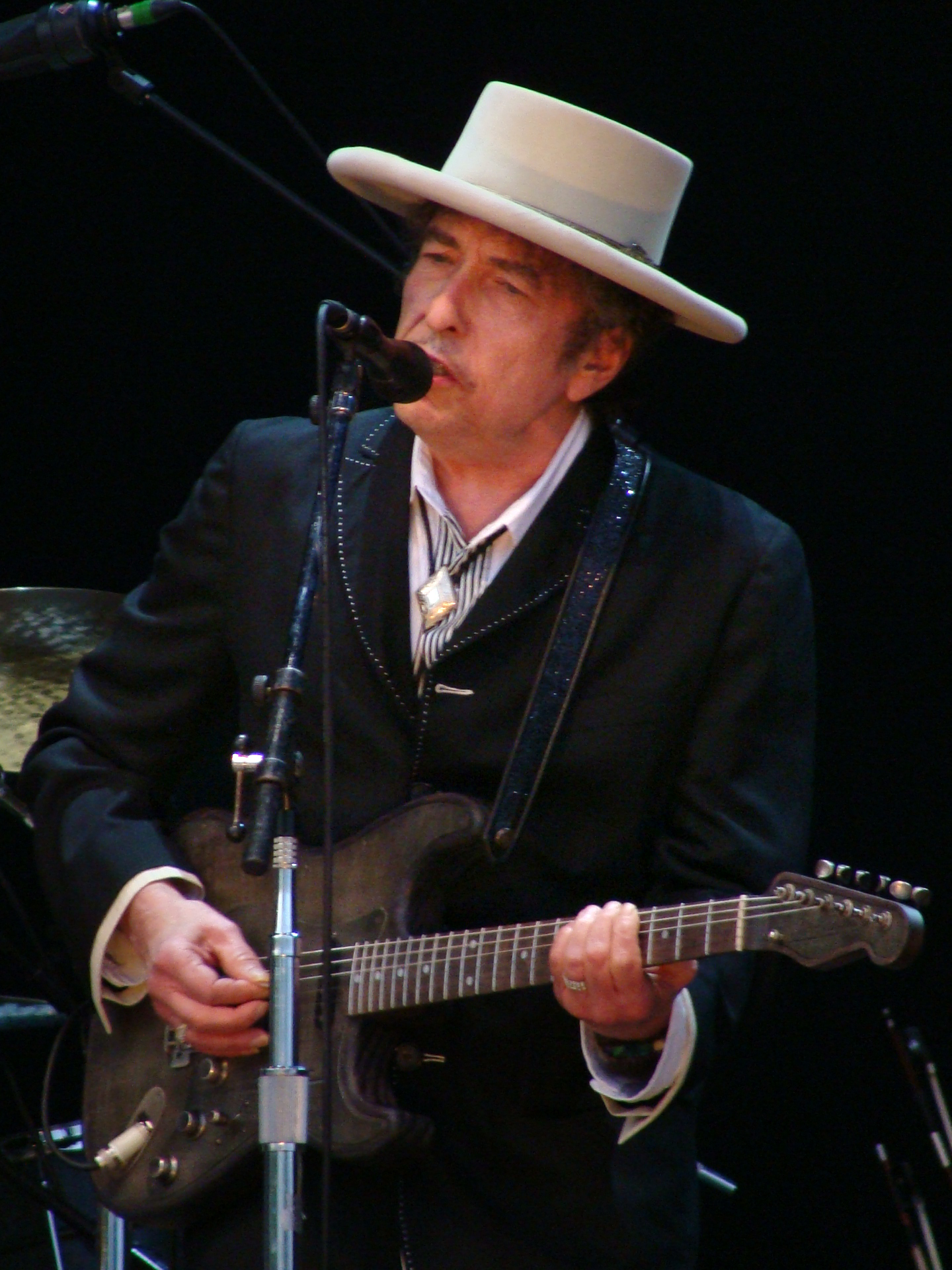
Bob Dylan

=== 1984–99 ===
In 1984, a judge of first instance prohibited a poster that advertised the film Ave Maria by Jacques Richard. The poster showed a young woman, covered only at the waist, with her arms and feet tied to a cross. No appeal was made.

In 1985, three organizations asked a court in Paris to ban the film Je vous salue, Marie by Jean-Luc Godard. The film put the biblical story of Mary and Joseph in a modern setting. The organizations said the film insulted their religion. The court refused to ban the film.

In 1988, a court refused to ban the film The Last Temptation of Christ by Martin Scorsese. Several organizations argued that the film insulted Christians, but the trial judge allowed the film to be shown if it contained the warning—and if its advertising contained the warning—that the film was not an adaptation of the Bible.

In 1989, a court in Paris refused to ban the novel The Satanic Verses by Salman Rushdie for being an insult to Muslims, because the novel was not forced on anyone.

In 1994, the newspaper Le Quotidien de Paris published the article L'obscurité de l'erreur by journalist, sociologist, and historian Paul Giniewski. The article was a reaction to the publication of the papal encyclical Veritatis Splendor. In the article, Giniewski criticizes the Pope, and states that "Catholic doctrine abetted the conception and the realization of Auschwitz". A Catholic organization initiated criminal proceedings on the ground that the article was an insult to a group because of its religion. The court of first instance convicted the newspaper, but the first court of appeal annulled the conviction. The Catholic organization launched a civil action. The court of first instance decided that the article constituted a defamation of Catholics, but the first court of appeal disagreed. The Supreme Court of Appeal held that the first court of appeal had made an error, and referred the matter back to that court. The first court of appeal then held Giniewski liable for defaming Catholics. Giniewski appealed, but the Supreme Court of Appeal rejected his contention that his aim was not to insult Catholics but to present an opinion in good faith. Giniewski appealed to the European Court of Human Rights. The European Court held that the courts of France were wrong.

In 1997, a Christian organization asked for the removal of a poster which advertised the film The People vs Larry Flynt by Miloš Forman. The poster depicted a miniature Woody Harrelson—the actor who played the role of porn-tycoon Larry Flynt—in a loincloth made from the American flag, and suspended as though crucified upon the pubic area of a bikini-clad woman. A court rejected the organization's contention that the poster insulted Christians.

In 1998, a Christian organization asked to ban caricatures published by the satirical magazine La Grosse Bertha. One of its covers represented Christ dying with the inscription: I suck (in French, "je suçe", which pronounces similarly to "Jesus") was his name by Robert Obscene and Alain Porno from the Acadébite (a play on the words Academy and penis), on inside page a cartoon with the Christ saying Why have you forsaken Me Jerk? and the apostles at the foot of the cross carrying banners: pension forced to 33 years, Job insecurity, in back page, a drawing titled miscellaneous news item illustrated with a disemboweled slept naked woman a crucifix crashed in the vagina and on another cover under the title: the Pope at the transvestites, a drawing representing Pope John-Paul II sodomized by a transvestite who exclaims: welcome to Brazil. The courts of first instance and appeal decided that they didn't constitute an incitement to hatred towards the Catholics. The Supreme Court of Appeal held that the first court of appeal had made a procedural error, and referred the matter back to another court which confirmed the absence of conviction decided by the lower courts and considered that mockery of the Catholic religion, the faiths, the symbols, and the rites of the religious practice had not caused any state of mind for incitement to discrimination, hatred, or violence and was no justification to restrict the liberty of the press.

=== 2000–09 ===
In 2002, a Christian organization asked for the removal of a poster which advertised the film Amen. by Costa Gavras. The poster depicted a cross and a swastika, a priest, and a Nazi officer. The organization said the poster was an insult to Catholics. A court found otherwise.

In 2002, a court in Paris considered a complaint by several civil-rights organizations about a remark by Michel Houellebecq, the author of the novel Platforme. During an interview, Houellebecq remarked that Islam is "the stupidest religion." The court decided the remark could neither be considered a racial insult to Muslims, nor an incitement to religious or racial hatred.

In 2002, several civil-rights organizations initiated civil and criminal proceedings against Oriana Fallaci and her publisher for the novel La Rage et l'Orgueil. The organizations argued that the novel insulted Arabs, Muslims, and Islam, and incited discrimination, hatred, and violence on religious and racial grounds. The legal proceedings foundered for procedural reasons.

In March 2005, Marithé François Girbaud, a brand of women's clothing, had a billboard—40 metres long—placed on a building on the Avenue Charles-de-Gaulle in Neuilly-sur-Seine. The billboard featured a photograph of 12 beautiful, well-dressed women and one shirtless man posed round a table in the manner of the characters in the painting The Last Supper by Leonardo da Vinci. A Catholic organization complained that the billboard insulted a group of people because of their religion. The court of first instance convicted Girbaud, and ordered the billboard removed. In April 2005, a higher court upheld the conviction. In November 2006, the Supreme Court of Appeal annulled the conviction.

On 25 April 2005, the daily newspaper Libération published a depiction of Christ—naked except for a big condom—on a cloud above a gathering of bishops. Text on the drawing has a white bishop telling a black bishop that Christ would have used a condom. A Catholic organization complained that the drawing insulted a group of people because of their religion. In November 2005, the court of first instance acquitted Libération. In May 2006, a higher court confirmed the decision of the lower court. In May 2007, the Supreme Court of Appeal confirmed the decisions of the lower courts.

In 2005, the organization Aides Haute-Garonne organized La nuit de la Sainte-Capote (the night of the Holy Condom), an informative evening about the prevention of the human immunodeficiency virus. To announce the event, the organization handed out a prospectus. The prospectus contained a head-and-shoulders image of a woman wearing a nun's bonnet. Near that image was the image of two pink condoms. The prospectus's text asked for the protection of Sainte Capote. A Catholic organization initiated proceedings on the ground that the prospectus insulted a group because of its religion. The court of first instance convicted Aides Haute-Garonne. The first court of appeal, the Court of Toulouse, upheld the conviction. In February 2006, the Supreme Court of Appeal annulled the conviction.

In 2006, the satirical weekly Charlie Hebdo released a special issue which featured cartoons pertinent to Islam, including some from the Danish newspaper Jyllands-Posten. A Muslim organization initiated criminal proceedings against Philippe Val, editor-in-chief of Charlie Hebdo, for insulting a group of people because of their religion. In March 2007, the court of first instance acquitted Val. The first court of appeal confirmed the lower court's judgment on the ground that the cartoons targeted only terrorists or fundamentalists—not the whole Muslim community.

On 18 January 2007, a tribunal in Lyon sentenced Bruno Gollnisch to a three-month, suspended prison-term and a fine of €5,000 for the offense of contesting information about the Holocaust. The court also ordered him to pay €55,000 in damages to the plaintiffs and to pay for the judgment to be published in the newspapers that originally printed his remarks.

In 2007, the Supreme Court of Appeal considered a remark by a comedian during an interview published in the journal Lyon Capitale. The comedian said that "Jews are a sect, a fraud". The court said the remark was an insult to a group defined by their place of origin.

In 2008, legendary French actress Brigitte Bardot was convicted for the fifth time for inciting hatred. The Movement Against Racism and for Friendship between Peoples (MRAP) filed the charge against Bardot because, in a letter to the government about throat-cutting of animals during the Muslim festival of Eid al-Adha, she complained about "this population that leads us around by the nose, [and] which destroys our country."

=== 2010–present ===
In 2013 Bob Dylan was placed under judicial investigation in France for allegedly provoking ethnic hatred of Croats. It followed a legal complaint lodged by a Croat association in France over a 2012 interview Dylan gave to Rolling Stone magazine. In April 2014, the case against Dylan himself was dropped, but the director of Rolling Stone's French edition was ordered to stand trial.
