= Minister of Sports (France) =

French cabinet member

Minister of Sport, Youth and Community life
- Ministère des Sports, de la Jeunesse et de la Vie associative
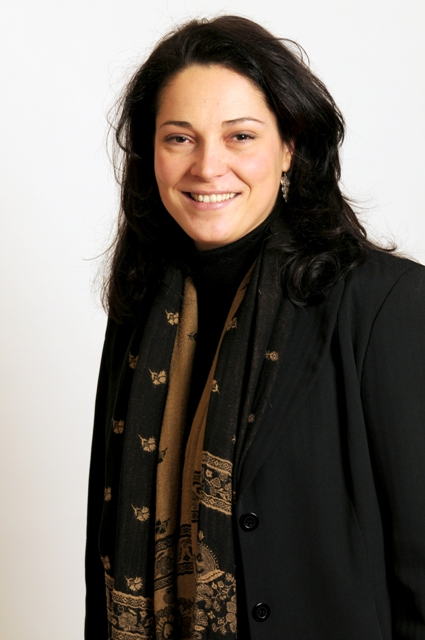
- Incumbent; Marina Ferrari since 5 October 2025
- Member of: Cabinet
- Reports to: President of the Republic; Prime Minister
- Seat: Paris 13^{e}, France
- Nominator: Prime Minister
- Appointer: President of the Republic
- Term length: No fixed term
- Formation: 1921 (Physical education); 4 June 1936 (Sports & leisure)
- Website: sports.gouv.fr

The Minister of Sports (French: Ministre des Sports) is a cabinet member in the Government of France.

The position has changed names a number of times since its creation, having occasionally been discontinued or regrouped with the Minister of National Education. Since 2022 Amélie Oudéa-Castéra has served Minister for Sport and the Olympic & Paralympic Games.

== Officeholders ==
=== Fourth republic ===
- Andrée Viénot (Under Secretary of State of Youth and Sports): 24 June 1946 - 22 January 1947
- Pierre Bourdan (Minister of Youth Affairs and Sports): 22 January – 22 October 1947
- André Morice (Secretary of State of Youth, Sports and Professional Education): 11 September 1948 – 11 August 1951
- Pierre Chevalier (Secretary of State of Youth, Sports and Professional Education): 11 August – 12 August 1951
- Claude Lemaître-Basset (Secretary of State of Youth, Sports and Professional Education): 12 August 1951 – 20 January 1952
- Jean Masson (Secretary of State of Youth, Sports and Professional Education): 20 January 1952 – 28 June 1953
- René Billères (Minister of National Education, Youth Affairs and Sports): 1 February 1956 – 14 May 1958

=== Fifth republic ===
- Maurice Herzog (High-commissar of Youth and Sports) 27 September 1958 – 8 January 1966
- François Missoffe (Minister of Youth Affairs and Sports): 8 January 1966 – 30 May 1968
- Roland Nungesser (Minister of Youth Affairs and Sports): 30 May – 10 July 1968
- Jean-Pierre Soisson (Minister of Youth Affairs, Sports and of Leisure Activities): 5 April 1978 – 22 May 1981
- André Henry (Minister of Free Time): 22 May 1981 – 22 March 1983
- Alain Calmat (Minister of Youth Affairs and Sports): 23 July 1984 – 20 March 1986
- Christian Bergelin (Secretary of State for Youth Affairs and Sports): 20 March 1986 – 13 May 1988
- Lionel Jospin (Minister of National Education, Research and Sports): 13 May 1988 – 16 May 1991
- Frédérique Bredin (Minister of Youth Affairs and Sports): 16 May 1991 – 29 March 1993
- Michèle Alliot-Marie (Minister of Youth Affairs and Sports): 29 March 1993 – 18 May 1995
- Guy Drut (Minister of Youth Affairs and Sports): 7 November 1995 – 4 June 1997
- Marie-George Buffet (Minister of Youth Affairs and Sports): 4 June 1997 – 7 May 2002
- Jean-François Lamour (Minister of Youth Affairs, Sports and Associative Life): 7 May 2002 – 18 May 2007
- Roselyne Bachelot-Narquin (Minister of Youth Affairs, Sports and Health): 18 May 2007 – 14 November 2010
- Chantal Jouanno (Minister of Sports): 14 November 2010 – 26 September 2011
- David Douillet (Minister of Sports): 26 September 2011 – 16 May 2012
- Valérie Fourneyron (Minister of Youth Affairs, Sports and Associative Life): 16 May 2012 – 31 March 2014
- Najat Vallaud-Belkacem (Minister of Women's Rights, Minister of City Affairs, Minister of Youth Affairs and Sports): 2 April – 25 August 2014, with Thierry Braillard as minister delegate for sports
- Patrick Kanner (Minister of the Urbanity, Youth Affairs and Sports): 26 August 2014 – 17 May 2017, with Thierry Braillard as minister delegate for sports
- Laura Flessel (Minister of Sports): 17 May 2017 – 4 September 2018
- Roxana Maracineanu (Minister of Sports): 4 September 2018 – 6 July 2020
- Roxana Maracineanu (Minister Delegate for Sport): 6 July 2020 – 20 May 2022
- Amélie Oudéa-Castéra (Minister for Sport and the Olympic & Paralympic Games): 20 May 2022 – 21 September 2024
- Gil Avérous (Minister for Sports, Youth Affairs and Associations): 21 September 2024 – 23 December 2024
- Marie Barsacq (Minister for Sports, Youth Affairs and Associations): 23 December 2024 – 5 October 2025
- Marina Ferrari (Minister of Sports, Youth and Community Life): 5 October 2025 – incumbent

== See also ==
- Minister Delegate (France)
- Cabinet (government)
