= Anne-Sophie Lapix =

French journalist and television presenter

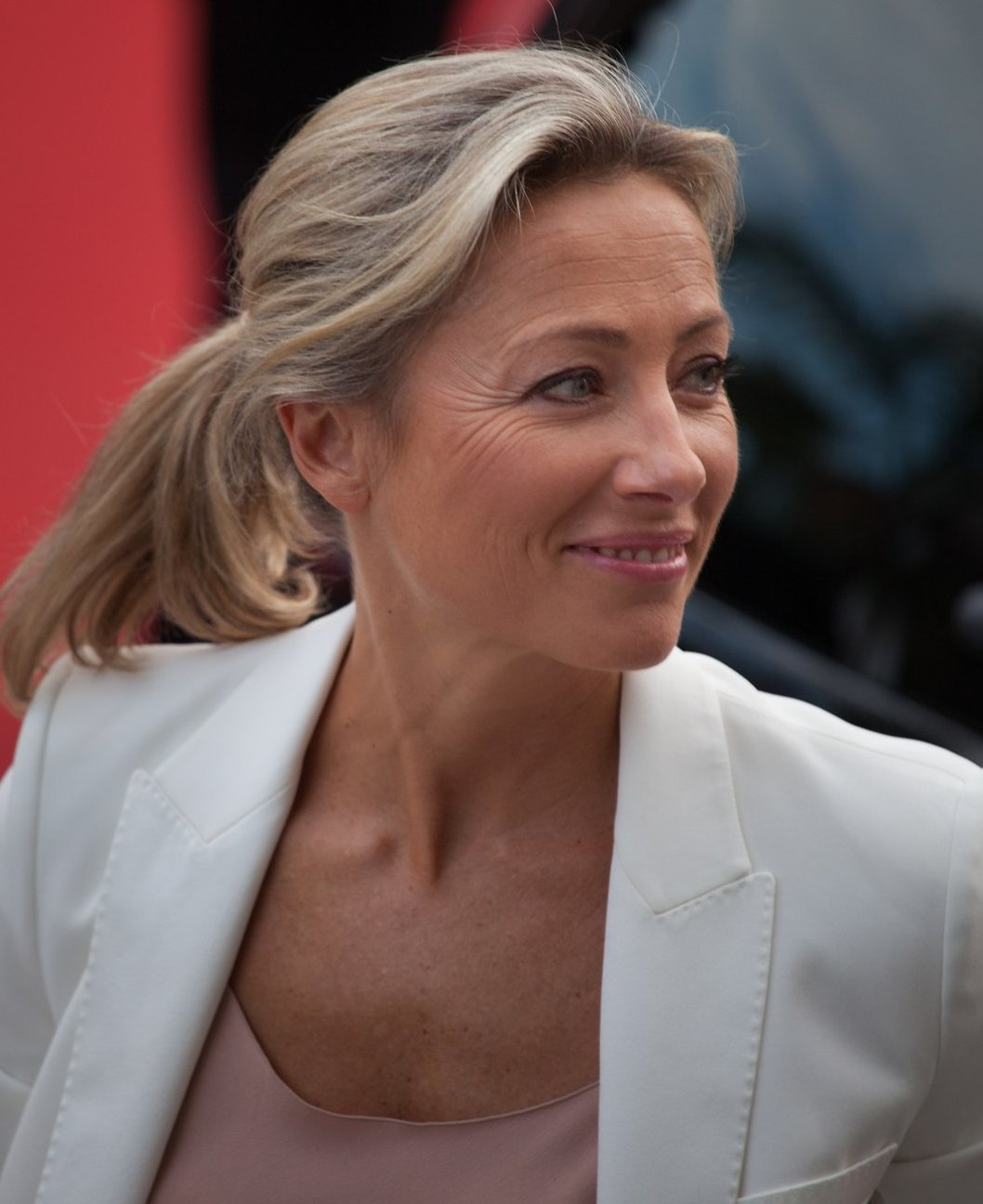
- Lapix in 2018
- Born: 29 April 1972 (age 54); Saint-Jean-de-Luz, Pyrénées-Atlantiques, France
- Education: Sciences Po Bordeaux; CFJ Paris
- Occupations: Journalist; news presenter; television presenter
- Known for: C à vous Journal de 20 heures
- Spouse: Arthur Sadoun (m. 2010)
- Children: 2

Anne-Sophie Lapix (born 29 April 1972) is a French journalist, news anchor, and television presenter. She is best known for presenting the flagship 8 pm news program, Journal de 20 heures, on France 2 from September 2017 to June 2025. Lapix has been described as "regularly feared by the political sphere for her sometimes incisive tone in interviews and for her ability not to spare her interlocutors".

Lapix was born and grew up in Saint-Jean-de-Luz. She studied and graduated from Sciences Po Bordeaux and CFJ Paris, and also spent a year at the University of Bristol. Lapix worked for Bloomberg, TF1 Group's LCI, and M6, where she presented the news magazine Zone interdite, before joining the TF1 team, alongside Claire Chazal. She also presented the Sunday evening magazine program Sept à Huit with Harry Roselmack while at TF1. In 2008, Lapix began presenting the political television program Dimanche+ on Canal+, when her interviewing dexterity in this field became apparent. She presented C à vous on France 5 from 2013 to 2017.

Lapix was the face of France 2's Journal de 20 heures for eight years, until the end of June 2025. Starting in the fall of 2025, she will join the M6 channel to host Sunday interviews and cover major events. She will also join RTL, where she will replace Yves Calvi on the 6 pm to 8 pm news program. Lapix was made an Officer of the Order of Arts and Letters in 2020.

== Early life and education ==
Anne-Sophie Lapix was born on 29 April 1972 in Saint-Jean-de-Luz, Pyrénées-Atlantiques, France. Her father, Claude, was an entrepreneur in the construction industry. Her mother, Claudine, was a trained psychologist. She has an older sister, Gaëlle, who later became a music teacher.

At the age of 10, Lapix considered a career in journalism. With her friends, she launched her newspaper called Le Monde Vu par les Enfants (lit. 'The World Seen by Children'), which she distributed on the streets of the Basque Coast seaside resort, selling the sheet for 5 francs. Lapix was enrolled at the Saint-Joseph school in Saint-Jean-de-Luz, known as the "city of Corsairs", and then at Saint-Thomas. The "good student" grew up near the ocean, remaining close to her mother and sister after her parents' early divorce. She took classical dance and music classes during this time.

After graduating with a baccalauréat diploma, Lapix enrolled in the public affairs course at Sciences Po Bordeaux (IEP). She spent a year at the University of Bristol, England, as part of a contract between Sciences Po Bordeaux and the university, through the Erasmus Programme in politics. It was by listening to French radio that she prepared for her entrance exam to the Centre de formation des journalistes (CFJ) (lit. 'Journalism Training Centre') the same year. Lapix was admitted into both the École supérieure de journalisme de Lille (ESJ Lille) (lit. 'Superior School of Journalism of Lille') and the CFJ in Paris. She chose Paris over Lille because the city was not unfamiliar to her, her mother being Parisian. Entering the CFJ Paris, Lapix moved towards a career in "presentation" and specialising in television. She "studied brilliantly" at Sciences Po Bordeaux and then at the CFJ. She took on many odd jobs during this period, such as giving math and French lessons to children, she said. Lapix graduated from Sciences Po Bordeaux and the CFJ in 1996.

== Career in journalism ==
=== 1995-1996: Regional channels ===
She began her career as a stringer for Sud Ouest in July 1995, producing reports as part of an internship, and later for France 3 Lorraine Champagne-Ardenne. At the beginning of 1996, she made her first television appearance on TV8 Mont-Blanc in Annecy, replacing the absent presenter at the last minute.

=== 1996-1999: Bloomberg TV ===
From October 1996 to April 1999, Lapix was a presenter and interviewer for the business channel Bloomberg TV.

=== 1999-2005: TF1 Group ===
After being spotted by Jean-Claude Dassier, the director of 24-hour news channel LCI, Lapix joined LCI as a presenter in 1999. In parallel, she worked from 2001 to 2002 for Sortie en salle on Cinéstar and presented daily coverage of news from the Cannes Film Festival in June 2002.

Starting in September 2004, Lapix co-presented the Grand Journal de LCI with Damien Givelet.

Lapix had presented more than 6,000 news programs on LCI.

=== 2005-2006: M6 ===
In the summer of 2005, Lapix joined M6 to become the main presenter and managing editor of the news program Zone interdite, replacing Bernard de La Villardière. Starting in January 2006, she began presenting Le 12:50, the then-new midday news program launched by M6, which aired Monday through Friday. On 2 May, she inaugurated 13h10 le Mag, a new daily news magazine following 12:50. Two days later, she announced that she was leaving for TF1. Mélissa Theuriau succeeded Lapix on Zone interdite and Nathalie Renoux succeeded Anne-Sophie Lapix on Le 12:50.

=== 2006-2008: Return to TF1 ===
In the fall of 2006, Lapix became the regular replacement for Claire Chazal for the main 8 pm news program on TF1, presenting the bulletin on weekends.

She co-presented a Sunday program, Sept à huit, alongside Harry Roselmack. She presented her first news bulletin on 5 January 2007.

=== 2008-2013: Canal+ ===
In 2008, Lapix left TF1 to join Canal+, replacing Laurence Ferrari as presenter of the political program Dimanche+ (lit. 'Sunday+'), while Marie Drucker was also considered for this position. Christophe Pinol of the Tribune de Genève said, "very quickly, her qualities as an interviewer made the difference". Over the years she spent at Dimanche+, she frequently infuriated French politicians during her interviews, regardless of their political affiliation, from Arnaud Montebourg to Nicolas Sarkozy.

From September 2010 to June 2012, she also presented a news bulletin on Canal+, airing on Sundays at 12:45 pm on Dimanche+. From the fall of 2012, Dimanche+ was shifted to 2:20 pm, a less favourable time slot.

In 2012, Lapix's interview with Marine Le Pen on the set of Dimanche+ spurred much discussion when the candidate was "destabilised." Lapix was interrogating Le Pen for her economic plan as part of her presidential run, and, confronted with many questions about her plan, "the candidate lost her cool" and pushed back against Lapix for trying to give her an "economics lesson." The muscular exchange was widely viewed on social media.

=== 2013-2025: France Télévisions ===
In June 2013, she announced her arrival on the television show C à vous (lit. 'It's yours'), which led to her being sued by Canal+ because she was bound to the channel by an image contract that was due to expire on 31 August 2013. Canal+ suffered a reversal of fortune, losing its lawsuit and being ordered to pay Lapix €5,000.

From September 2014 to June 2015, she replaced Yves Calvi on the program Mots croisés on France 2, while continuing to present C à vous.

On 11 January 2015 following the Charlie Hebdo shooting on 7 January, she co-presented an evening program alongside Patrick Cohen and Nagui in support of journalists, Je suis Charlie, simultaneously broadcast on France 2, France Inter, France Culture, France Bleu, TV5 Monde, and RTBF.

From Canal+ to France 5, her attacking-style interviews have often sparked conflicting moments between her and members of the National Front. In March 2017, radical-left leader Jean-Luc Mélenchon, Lapix's guest on C à vous, did not appreciate his interview and shortly afterwards described the show as a "trap". C à vous, and previously Dimanche+, regularly reached record audiences.

She hosted France 5's C à vous from 2013 to 2017.

==== Presenter of the Journal de 20 heures on France 2 ====
Lapix permanently replaced David Pujadas as the anchor of the television news program Journal de 20 heures on France 2, beginning on 4 Septembre 2017, to an audience of 5.79 million viewers. Agathe Mercante of Les Echos described Lapix as "A conscientious and diligent student who, in 20 years, has climbed the ladder of the PAF (Paysage audiovisuel français: lit. 'French audiovisual landscape') one by one."

From the fall of 2018, she presented Le Grand Échiquier (lit. 'The Great Chessboard') on France 2, in addition to the 8 pm news.

Known for her "pugnacity during political interviews", Lapix was the target of Emmanuel Macron and [Marine] Le Pen, who both agreed to refuse to participate in their televised debate for the 2022 presidential election if she were to interrogate them.

Many of her interviews with major politicians such as Macron, Le Pen, and Anne Hidalgo were praised for her "well-oiled repartees" and because she doesn't "spare" them. On 5 October 2024, the magazine C l'Hebdo devoted a segment to her titled "Anne-Sophie Lapix: A Politician's Nightmare?" that examined her interview style.

From the fall of 2024, she began presenting a new format for Journal de 20 heures with "an hour of news" between 8 pm and 9 pm, including the weather, and divided into two parts. First, between 7:58 pm and 8:30 pm or 8:35 pm, followed by a second half to 8:50 pm, with a long-format segment lasting between seven and nine minutes.

Charles Bremner of The Times said, "Tenacious and given to light sarcasm, Lapix differs from the traditionally emollient hosts of the '8pm JT'". Télérama wrote that Lapix is "Tough, precise, sometimes murderous" in her interactions with politicians; "she divides people". Offensive with "her mocking tone", the French political class, in general, is not fond of her "vibe", which gives the impression of saying "Tell me more, I'm fascinated".

On 26 May 2025, France Télévisions president Delphine Ernotte-Cunci, announced that Lapix would be removed from the Journal de 20 heures at the end of June 2025. France Télévisions yielded to political pressure, while France 2's 8 pm newscast also encountered a lower audience share compared to TF1's, which maintained a leading position. Georges Pinol, central union delegate of the SNJ-CGT at France Télévisions, said that Lapix "also pays for her will for independence". Lapix was thanked by France Télévisions "for her talent", as well as for "her commitment and her immense professionalism".

Lapix's last Journal de 20 heures occurred on 26 June 2025, after eight years on the France 2 evening program.

=== From 2025: M6 and RTL ===
On 16 June 2025, the M6 group announced that Lapix would join M6 in the fall as an interviewer for Sunday programs and presenter for coverage of major prime-time events. At the same time, she will replace Calvi as presenter of the 6 pm to 8 pm time slot on RTL radio. She will be responsible for the evening news program from 6 pm to 7:15 pm, then transition to a debate program until 8 pm.

== Personal life ==
After two years of living together, Lapix married Arthur Sadoun, CEO of the advertising agency Publicis, on 26 June 2010 at the town hall of the 16th arrondissement of Paris. Lapix has two children from a previous relationship, born in 2003 and 2006. The couple keep their lives private, only being seen on the red carpet of the annual Cannes Film Festival, or at Roland Garros. They reside in a mansion in the 16th arrondissement of Paris, where they used to host monthly dinners with prominent French business personalities, such as Alexandre Bompard and Stéphane Richard, among others. Sadoun was diagnosed with cancer in 2022, which Lapix described as "a huge ordeal".

In 2006, Lapix told a journalist from Elle that she had been practising classical dance for fifteen years. She practices various sports, including hiking, rafting, water skiing and speleology, as well as swimming intensively.

For several years, Lapix has been the patron and reciter of the Classic Festival in Guéthary, a chamber music festival in the Pyrénées-Atlantiques.

== Honours ==
Her "pugnacity under a courteous calm" earned her the Philippe-Caloni Prize for Best Interviewer in 2012.

In 2020, Lapix was conferred the rank of Officer of the Order of Arts and Letters by the French government.
