= Prix Richelieu =

French literary award

The Prix Richelieu is a French literary award that rewards a journalist who "testified by the quality of his own language, his concern to defend the French language". It is awarded annually, under the sponsorship of the association Défense de la langue française and the Éditions Larousse.

== History ==
This prize was created in 1992 on the occasion of the fortieth anniversary of the founding of the "Cercle de presse Richelieu".

The Cercle de presse Richelieu, created in 1952 by Paul Camus, Georges Duhamel, Jules Romains and Jean Cocteau, aims to preserve and expand the linguistic and cultural heritage and to maintain the quality and evolution of the French language in the modern world. It is always chaired by an academician: Léon Bérard, Maurice Genevoix, Jean Mistler, Jean Dutourd, Angelo Rinaldi and Philippe Beaussant.

== Laureates ==
- 2024 - Christine Kelly
- 2023 - Jean-Michel Djian
- 2022 - Emmanuel Khérad
- 2021 - Stéphane Bern
- 2020 - Étienne de Montety
- 2019 - Wendy Bouchard
- 2018 - Bernard de La Villardière
- 2017 - Bruno Frappat
- 2016 - Natacha Polony
- 2015 - François Busnel
- 2014 - Guillaume Roquette
- 2013 - Alain Duault, presenter, moderator.
- 2012 - Yves Calvi, chronicler at RTL.
- 2011 - Éric Zemmour, chronicler at Le Figaro Magazine.
- 2010 - Quentin Dickinson (Radio France) and Jean Quatremer (Libération).
- 2009 - Olivier Barrot, journalist and TV producer.
- 2008 - Claude Imbert, columnist at Le Point.
- 2007 - Frédéric Lodéon, animator and producer at Radio France.
- 2006 - Annette Gerlach and Florence Dauchez, editors and presenters of the "Journal of Culture" on Arte.
- 2005 - Michel Theys, chief editor of the "Européenne de Bruxelles".
- 2004 - Philippe d'Hugues, film critic
- 2003 - Claire Chazal, editor-in-chief and presenter at TF1.
- 2002 - Bernard Le Saux, chronicler and literary critic.
- 2001 - Jean Amadou, chronicler at Europe 1.
- 2000 - Bruno de Cessole, editor-in-chief of the culture pages of Valeurs actuelles.
- 1998 - 1999 - Franz-Olivier Giesbert, présenter of the "Gai Savoir" program on Paris Première.
- 1997 - Jean Lebrun, editor-in-chief of "Culture matin" on France Culture.
- 1996 - Renaud Matignon, chronicler at Le Figaro littéraire.
- 1995 - Jean-Claude Narcy, presenter of the news program of 20 o'clock on TF1.
- 1994 - Philippe Meyer, daily chronicler on France Inter.
- 1993 - Jean Tulard, Considered one of the best specialists of Napoleon Bonaparte and the Napoleonic era (Directory, Consulate and First French Empire), he is nicknamed by his peers "the master of Napoleonic studies". Jean-Pierre Colignon, chief proofreader on Le Monde and author of the section entitled "La cote des mots".
- 1992 - William Leymergie, presenter of the program "Télématin" on France 2.
