= Harry Roselmack =

French journalist

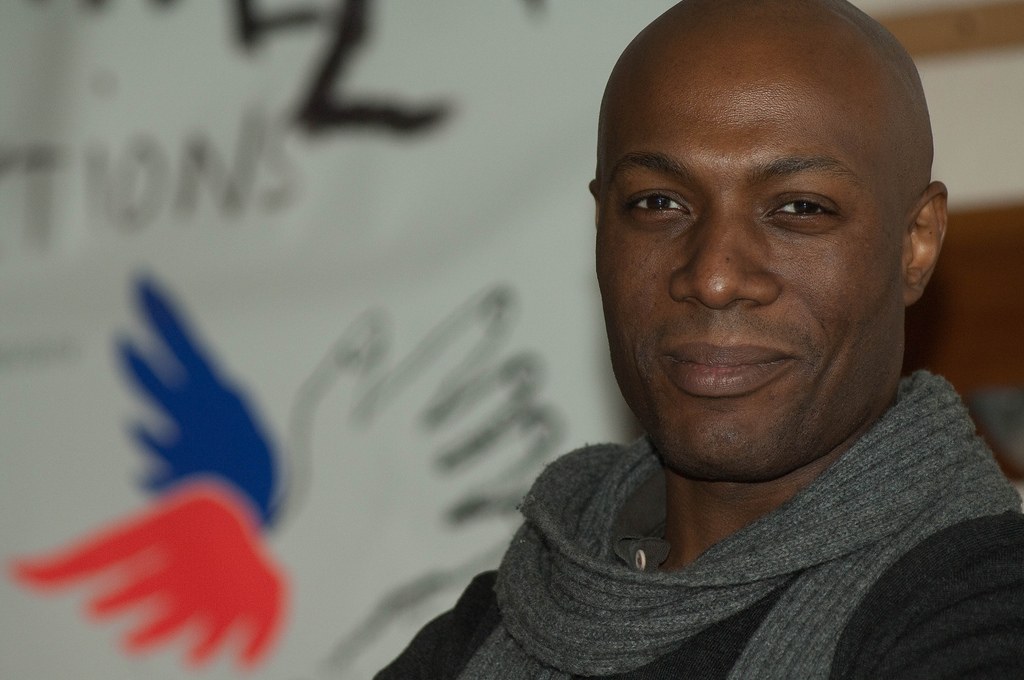
- Born: 20 March 1973 (age 53); Tours, France
- Occupation: Television host

Harry Roselmack (born 20 March 1973 in Tours) is a French radio and TV journalist of Martiniquan descent.

== Career ==
Harry Roselmack graduated with degrees in history (DEUG) and journalism (DUT).

He began to work for a local radio station, during this period. Then, he wrote some sports articles for a regional news paper La Nouvelle République du Centre-Ouest. Roselmack worked with Radio France in 2000 (France Bleu, France Info) before joining Canal+.

In 2006, he was appointed official summer replacement for Patrick Poivre d'Arvor, the evening news anchorman, by TF1. This decision triggered a number of moves between the major networks. Thomas Hugues, who had held this position for many years, left the channel, followed by his wife Laurence Ferrari, who was the official summer replacement of Claire Chazal. Mélissa Theuriau was offered Ferrari's job which she turned down, leaving for M6. Eventually, TF1 hired Anne-Sophie Lapix to succeed Ferrari. She later hosted Sept à huit together with Roselmack, a show which was formerly hosted by Hugues and Ferrari.

Harry Roselmack debuted on TF1 on 17 July 2006, becoming the channel's first black evening news anchorman, and garnering as much as 44.8% of the audience (over 8 million viewers).

In 2014, he directed his first feature film Fractures, which won a special mention at the 2017 Chelsea Film Festival.

== Filmography ==
=== As filmmaker ===
Year	Title	Credited as			Notes
Year	Title	Director	Screenwriter	Producer	Notes
2014	Le 13ème Homme			Yes	Short film
2015	Petits boulots d'été, le rêve!			Yes	Documentary
2015	7jours/7nuit à Courchevel			Yes	Documentary
2016	Dans l'ombre de Teddy Riner			Yes	TV movie documentary
2017	Fractures	Yes	Yes	Yes	feature film Special Mention of Chelsea Film Festival

== Commitments ==
In 2014, he sang On n'oublie pas (written by Serge Bilé) with several artists and personalities including Alpha Blondy, Jocelyne Béroard and Admiral T. This song is a tribute to the 152 Martinican victims of the crash of 16 August 2005, to remember this event and to help the AVCA, the association of the victims of the air disaster, to raise funds.
