= Florence Dauchez =

French journalist (born 1964)

- Born: 9 November 1964 (age 61); Paris, France
- Occupations: Journalist, Television presenter
- Spouse: Christophe de Ponfilly
- Children: 1

Florence Dauchez (born 9 November 1964) is a French journalist and TV host.

== Biography ==
After a Master of Law and modern literature, Florence Dauchez began her career in 1986 in the economics department of the newspaper Le Figaro as a trainee journalist, then became a reporter of foreign affairs for TF1. In 1990 she joined FR3 in the economy department of the La Cinq in 1991.

After the La Cinq ended, Florence Dauchez made a documentary about Algeria. Released on France 3, Rachida, lettres d'Algérie received the Prix Albert-Londres, the Festival international of Leipzig prize, the Prix Ondas and was even nominated for an Emmy Award.

After presenting a monthly magazine show, Autrement dit, and then the editions of the weekend nightly news show on the TV station France 2 from 1994 to 1997, Florence joined M6 in September 1997 (replacing Patrick de Carolis) to host the Sunday investigative reporting show Zone Interdite during the season 1997/1998.

From the end of June 2000, she hosted L'enjeu olympique, a weekly program on La Cinquième. After the failure of her bid for the presidency of CPAC (the Parliamentary Channel) in December 2002, Florence Dauchez joined the Franco-German channel Art in January 2004 to present until June 2005 the show Le journal de la culture, alternating presenting the show with Annette Gerlach.

From September 2005 to June 2007, Florence Dauchez hosted the show devoted to media + Clair, broadcast on the TV channel Canal +. From September 2006 to June 2008, she also hosted the show À juste titre on I>Télé, the news and information channel of groupe Canal+.

In September 2007 Florence Dauchez became the chief editor and presenter of JT de Canal + , a newscast of about twenty minutes, broadcast on Canal + at 18:45 from Monday to Friday, with Charlotte Le Grix de La Salle replacing her from the presentation duties at + Clair. From September 2008, in an evening news supplement on Canal +, she interviewed, in Le grand témoin, a guest each evening at 20:45 on i>Télé. Since September 2014 she has hosted the JT Canal + show on the weekends.

== Private life ==
In 1992, she married the journalist Christophe de Ponfilly, who died in 2006. They have a child, born in 1993.

== Awards and honours ==
Prix Albert Londres, Prix Ondas, and Prix du Festival de Leipzig. She also received the Prix Richelieu in 2006.

Florence Dauchez was named Chevalier l'Ordre national du Mérite.

== Television ==
- 1994 - 1997 : Le journal de la nuit, weekend editions on France 2
- 1997 : Autrement dit on France 2
- 1997 - 1998 : Zone interdite on M6
- 2000 - 2002 : L'enjeu olympique on France 5
- 2004 - 2005 : Le Journal de la Culture on Arte
- 2005 - 2007 : + Clair on Canal+
- 2006 - 2008 : À juste titre on i>Télé
- September 2007 - June 2014 : Le JT du Soir on Canal+
- September 2008 - December 2008 : Le grand témoin on i>Télé
- Since September 2014 : Le JT of the Week-end on Canal+

== Sources ==
- (in French) Portrait of Florence Dauchez on ToutelaTele.com
