= Ophélie Meunier =

French journalist and model

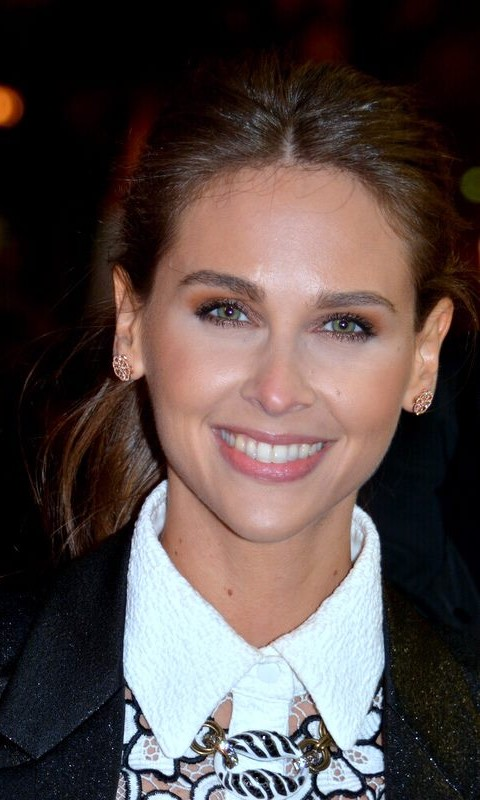
- Ophélie Meunier at the 41st César Awards.
- Born: 17 December 1987 (age 38); Versailles, Yvelines, France
- Occupations: Journalist, television presenter
- Years active: 2013–present (television)
- Notable credit(s): Le Petit Journal; Zone Interdite
- Television: Canal+ (2013–16); M6 (2016–present)

Ophélie Meunier (born 17 December 1987) is a French television presenter and former model.

== Early life and education ==
Ophélie Meunier was born in Versailles in the department of Yvelines. She grew up in a Mormon household in this town and then in Nice. Her father was a seller of alarm systems.

On 14 June 1992, she participated at the age of four-and-a-half in the television show L'École des fans hosted by Jacques Martin on Antenne 2, and with Julio Iglesias as a guest.

She later appeared in the magazines La Redoute and 3 Suisses. At the age of 12, she participated in the TV show C'est mon choix hosted by Évelyne Thomas.

After graduating with a scientific baccalauréat with distinction, she began a modelling career and travelled for five years around France, Europe, and the United States with the modelling agency Metropolitan.

== Television career ==
In 2011, she started reading journalism at the École supérieure de journalisme de Paris. The following year, she began her career as an assistant presenter, obtaining an internship on the channel I-Télé. In November 2012, she auditioned unsuccessfully for the role of Miss Météo on the channel Canal+.

In 2013, Ophélie Meunier presented the section "La Minute Pop" in Le Petit Journal hosted by Yann Barthès on Canal+. In September 2014, she left Le Petit Journal to join La Nouvelle Édition broadcast on the same channel in which the presented a new TV segment.

During summer 2015, she presented the day and evening news on Canal+. From September 2015 to June 2016, she hosted a media show called Le Tube on the same channel. She then joined M6 and hosts the newsmagazine Zone Interdite since September 2016 succeeding to Wendy Bouchard. She is also understudy to the evening news Le 19:45 usual presenter on the same channel since July 2016.
