= Pflimlin =

Pflimlin is a surname. Notable people with the surname include:

- Étienne Pflimlin (born 1941), French high-ranking civil servant and banker
- Pierre Pflimlin (1907–2000), French politician
  - Pierre Pflimlin Bridge, named for the aforementioned
- Rémy Pflimlin (1954–2016), French media executive
