= Explicite =

French online media

Explicite is a French online media. It has been created in January 2017 by a group of 50 journalists after they left I-Tele (now CNews).

Explicite is broadcast via social networks such as Facebook live, Twitter, Periscope, YouTube and Yahoo portal.

Explicite is a non-profit organization (Les Journalistes associés — Explicite) featuring Olivier Ravanello (president), Élodie Safaris, Antoine Genton and Laurent Bazin.
