= Anne-Claire Coudray =

French journalist and television presenter

- Born: 1 February 1977 (age 49); Rennes, France
- Education: University of Rennes; École supérieure de journalisme de Lille
- Occupations: Television journalist News anchor
- Employer: TF1

Anne-Claire Coudray (born 1 February 1977) is a French journalist and television presenter.

== Early life and education ==
Anne-Claire Coudray was born in Rennes in the department of Ille-et-Vilaine, and spent a part of her childhood in Locmariaquer, Morbihan, the native town of her maternal grandparents. Her father Jean Coudray is a psychologist and her mother is an English teacher. She pursued a Catholic education at the Lycée Saint-François-Xavier in Vannes and then preparatory classes at the Lycée Guist'hau in Nantes for two years in both hypokhâgne and khâgne. She then graduated in both Bachelor of Arts degree and master's degree of history at the University of Rennes 2 – Upper Brittany.

== Television career ==
After graduating at the École supérieure de journalisme de Lille in 2000, Anne-Claire Coudray then worked for the Internep agency of Lille, on reports in France and foreign countries for TF1 and Arte Info. She also presented a few programs on France 3. In May 2000, she joined the news service of TF1, arriving in Paris in 2004. She reported the 2008 Summer Olympics, the visit of Pope Benedict XVI in France in September 2008, the United States presidential election of 2008, and even the French military parade on 14 July 2009.

Since June 2009, she presents the society program TMC Reportages on TMC, a channel of the TF1 Group. In summer 2009, she became the replacing presenter of the news on LCI, a continuous news channel of the same group. In 2010, she replaced Bénédicte Le Chatelier after her maternity leave, to present the evening news on LCI. In December 2010, she reported on both TF1 and LCI the Ivorian presidential election opposing Laurent Gbagbo and Alassane Ouattara. In 2011, she reported the Dominique Strauss-Kahn affair in May, and the wedding of Albert II, Prince of Monaco.

In July 2012, she replaced Claire Chazal to present the afternoon and evening news on weekends and the program Reportages on TF1. During autumn 2012, she is a correspondent for TF1 in the United States to report the presidential election of 2012. Since 2013 Anne-Claire Coudray has presented the military parade of 14 July on TF1, with Gilles Bouleau and Jean-Claude Narcy in 2013 and with Louis Bodin and Denis Brogniart in 2014. During the 2017 French presidential election, she hosted alongside Bouleau the debate between the top five candidates on 20 March, as well as the program Demain Président in the lead-up to the first round.
