= Défense de la langue française =

French organisation

Défense de la langue française is a French association whose objective is the defense and promotion of the French language at the national and international level. DLF has received approval from associations for the defense of the French language. Its head office is in Paris.

== History ==
Founded in 1958 by Paul Camus Maurice Rat and others, it is the continuation and extension of the "Richelieu Press Circle" created in 1953 by the same Paul Camus with a view to stopping the degradation of language in the press. Among its first supporters were members of the Académie Française (Louis de Broglie, Jean Cocteau, Georges Duhamel, Maurice Genevoix, Édouard Herriot, Alphonse Juin, André Maurois, Jules Romains, André Siegfried) and the grammarians René Georgin and Émile Moussat.

In 1995, in application of the Toubon Law, it received approval from the Minister of Justice and the Minister of Culture as an association for the defense of the French language, which has been renewed every three years since then.

== Presidents ==
Since its foundation, the association has been chaired by an academic. Its leaders have been Léon Bérard (1958-?), Maurice Genevoix (?), Jean Mistler (?), Jean Dutourd (1989-2009), Angelo Rinaldi (2009-2011), Philippe Beaussant (2011-2016) and Xavier Darcos (from 2016).

== Controversies ==
In March 2011, the association awards the Prix Richelieu to Éric Zemmour, despite his conviction the previous month for incitement to racial hatred by the 17th chamber of the Tribunal de Paris. In protest, the president of the association, Angelo Rinaldi, resigns. He is replaced by Philippe Beaussant.
