= L'étoile du soldat =

L'Étoile du soldat is a French film by the director Christophe de Ponfilly, who made several movies and documentaries in Afghanistan. The film was released after his suicide in 2006.

== Synopsis ==
The film retraces the steps of a Russian guitarist, Nikolaï, from a town outside Moscow. He has a poor relationship with his parents and when Nikolaï is drafted into the Russian army and sent to the 1980s Soviet–Afghan War, his father thinks this will make him into a real man.

We are then shown how the Russian forces have established a base in a remote valley, from where they are trying to root out Mujahideen rebels fighting the Russian-backed regime in Kabul. The new Russian recruits are unprepared and unsure why and who they are fighting. Nikolaï witnesses an ugly incident where a Russian soldier tries to rape an Afghan woman, but she stabs and kills him. Torn in his loyalties, he motions for the woman to escape from his fellow Russian conscripts surrounding the village, since they would certainly have killed her for her actions.

Nikolaï is later captured as a prisoner of war by the Mujahideen. In captivity he is initially scared, and his captors are hostile to this foreigner, who is a symbol of the invasion. But he gradually forges a bond with Commander Massoud of the Mujahideen, questions his own identity, and relates more with the rebel forces than with the Russian troops that constantly attack Afghan homes and villages with tanks and helicopters.

Later in the film, after a young girl, Massoud's niece, tells the Commander of Nikolaï's bravery in allowing the woman to flee and thus sparing her life, he gains the respect of the rebels and is set free. A French war photographer, Vergos (played by the real life war observer Patrick Chauvel), also features in the story. He is also a foreigner in Afghanistan accompanying the rebel forces to document their struggle, which was taking place before satellite communication and thus was largely concealed from international scrutiny. Nikolaï and Vergos establish a friendship, and the two of them escape to Pakistan, with a promise from Vergos that he will take Nikolaï to France. We are led to believe that the pair will reveal to the world the extent of brutality in the war. The film ends with them staring out to the border, with a 10-hour walk ahead of them. A postscript tells us that Nikolaï was later killed in an ambush in Pakistan. A brief image reminds us that the film is based on a true story of a Russian conscript who changed sides after his capture.

Vergos, back in Afghanistan in 2001, looks back on events in the early 1980s. He ruminates on how CIA/American support for the Mujahideen against the Russian-backed regime at that time had the unforeseen outcome of creating more radical Islam. The events in the movie are, therefore, a 'flashback' from 2001 to 1983, and an indictment of ill-advised meddling by both the US and Russia.

== Production details ==
The film was shot in Afghanistan in rural and remote regions in August and September 2005, and October 2005 in Russia. Most scenes are high in the mountains with spectacular vistas, and use many local actors. The writer, Christian Kracht, has a short cameo appearance as a Red Army soldier.

There is a graphic novel version of the story published by Casterman, drawn by René Follet.

== Details ==
- Title: L'étoile du soldat
- Director: Christophe de Ponfilly
- Script: Christophe de Ponfilly, Rim Turki
- Director of photography: Laurent Fleutot, Didier Portal
- Sound: Alain Curvelier, Stéphane Albinet
- Film: Anja Lüdcke
- Music: Jean-Baptiste Loussier
- Production: Albert Films
- Co-Production: NEF Filmproduktion und vertriebs GmbH, AFGHAN FILM, FRANCE 2 CINEMA, EuroArts Medien GmbH
- Distribution: Les Films du Losange
- Country of origin: France
- Format: 35 mm (1:85) – super 16 mm DVHD
- Visa: 112944
- Genre: Documentary fiction
- Length: 1 H 45
- Date: 22
- Budget 3.4 million euros (assistance of E360,000 from Eurimages and E300,000 from Franco-allemandes co-productions.

== Cast ==
- Sacha Bourdo – Nikolaï
- Patrick Chauvel – Vergos
- Philippe Caubère – Narrator of the French soundtrack
- Hanns Zischler – Narrator of the German soundtrack
- Mohammad Amin – Najmoudine
- Ahmad Shah Alefsourat – Assad
- Gol Gotey – Leïla
- Denis Manohin – Mosgh
- Pavel Kuzin – Lieutenant
- Elena Mikheeva – La mère de Nikolaï
- Serguey Sonovsky – Le père de Nikolaï
- Murad Ibrahim Bekov – Zanoviev
- Akbar Aiqhair – Villager
- Mollah Abdellah Amini – Molla
- Abkar Arqahoui – Baba Leïla
- Saïd Azim – Mollawi
- Brehna Bahar – Attacked woman
- Wazir Bakhashi – Ali
- Pacha Barchak – Leonid
- Abdoul Raffar Daouiri – Villager
- Vladimir Davidenko – Igor
- Hayatullah Elmi – Interpreter
- Gollam Farouk – Nailjik
- Ahmad Faycal – Professor Dari
- Sabour Khanji – Afghan Officer
- Ram Khoda – Old man
- Dimitri Koltsov – Sargeant
- German Magnusov – Boris
- Zabi Nabart – Ara
- Igor Naryshkin – Valovdia
- Ahmad Wali Oqhab
- Evgueny Printsev – Andrey
- Ilia Prossekin – Saratov
- Ariq Sakhi – Commander
- Quiam Sidik
- Nathalia Zhitkova – Tania

== Prize ==
- Best film, festival d'automne de Gardanne, France
