= Ophélie =

Ophélie is the French equivalent of Ophelia

== Music ==
- Ophélie, character in Hamlet (opera) by Ambroise Thomas
- "Ophélie", poem by Arthur Rimbaud set by:
  - "Ophélie", art song by Paul Hermann (composer)
  - "Ophélie", art song by Denis Gougeon
- "Ophélie", popular song by Dominique Dalcan
- "Ophélie", song Jad Wio and Nouvelle Vague (band)
- "Ophélie", song Daniel Lavoie
- "Ophélie", song by Vanessa Paradis
- "Ophélie (Douce ennemie)", Angelo Branduardi
- "Ophélie flagrant des lits", Michel Polnareff
- "Ophélie oh folie", Johnny Hallyday
- "Ophélie", piece by Augusta Holmès

== People ==
- Ophélie Winter (1974), French singer
- Ophélie Meunier (1987), French television presenter
- Ophélie Gaillard (1974), French cellist
- Ophélie David (1976), French freestyle skier
- Ophélie Meilleroux, French football player
- Ophélie Aspord (1991), French distance swimmer at the 2012 Summer Olympics

== See also ==
- fr:Ophélie (La Défense), sculpture
- fr:Ophélie (pétrolier)
