= Demain Président =

- Directed by: Thierry Petitdidier; Eric Freslon
- Presented by: Anne-Claire Coudray; Gilles Bouleau
- Starring: Christophe Jakubyszyn
- Country of origin: France
- Original language: French
- No. of episodes: 11

Production
- Running time: 20 minutes

Original release
- Network: TF1
- Release: 10 April 2017 – present

Demain Président (transl. Tomorrow President), is a French political television programme hosted by Anne-Claire Coudray and Gilles Bouleau aired daily on TF1 from 10 to 20 April 2017 at 20:20 CEST. The 20-minute programme, aired during the official campaign of the 2017 French presidential election, seeks to introduce and interrogate the projects presented by the 11 candidates of the presidential election. The broadcast is split into three sections: a portrait on the candidate by Christophe Jakubyszyn, France in 2022, and an opportunity to respond to one or two direct questions from the French people. In general, it shares numerous similarities with L'Entretien politique on France 2.

== List of episodes ==
No.	Air date	Party	Invitee(s)	Viewers	MS	Ref(s)
1	10 April 2017	S&P	Jacques Cheminade	4,850,000	20.8%	
2	11 April 2017	UPR	François Asselineau	4,760,000	20.4%	
3	12 April 2017	PS	Benoît Hamon	4,330,000	19.3%	
4	13 April 2017	LO	Nathalie Arthaud	4,440,000	20.7%	
5	14 April 2017	FI	Jean-Luc Mélenchon	4,663,000	22.5%	
6	15 April 2017	NPA	Philippe Poutou	4,744,000	25.2%	
7	16 April 2017	DLF	Nicolas Dupont-Aignan	4,405,000	22.6%	
8	17 April 2017	EM	Emmanuel Macron	5,910,000	25.1%	
9	18 April 2017	FN	Marine Le Pen	5,695,000	24%	
10	19 April 2017	LR	François Fillon	5,473,000	23%	
11	20 April 2017	R	Jean Lassalle	5,230,000	22%	
