= Thomas Hugues =

French journalist, producer and television host

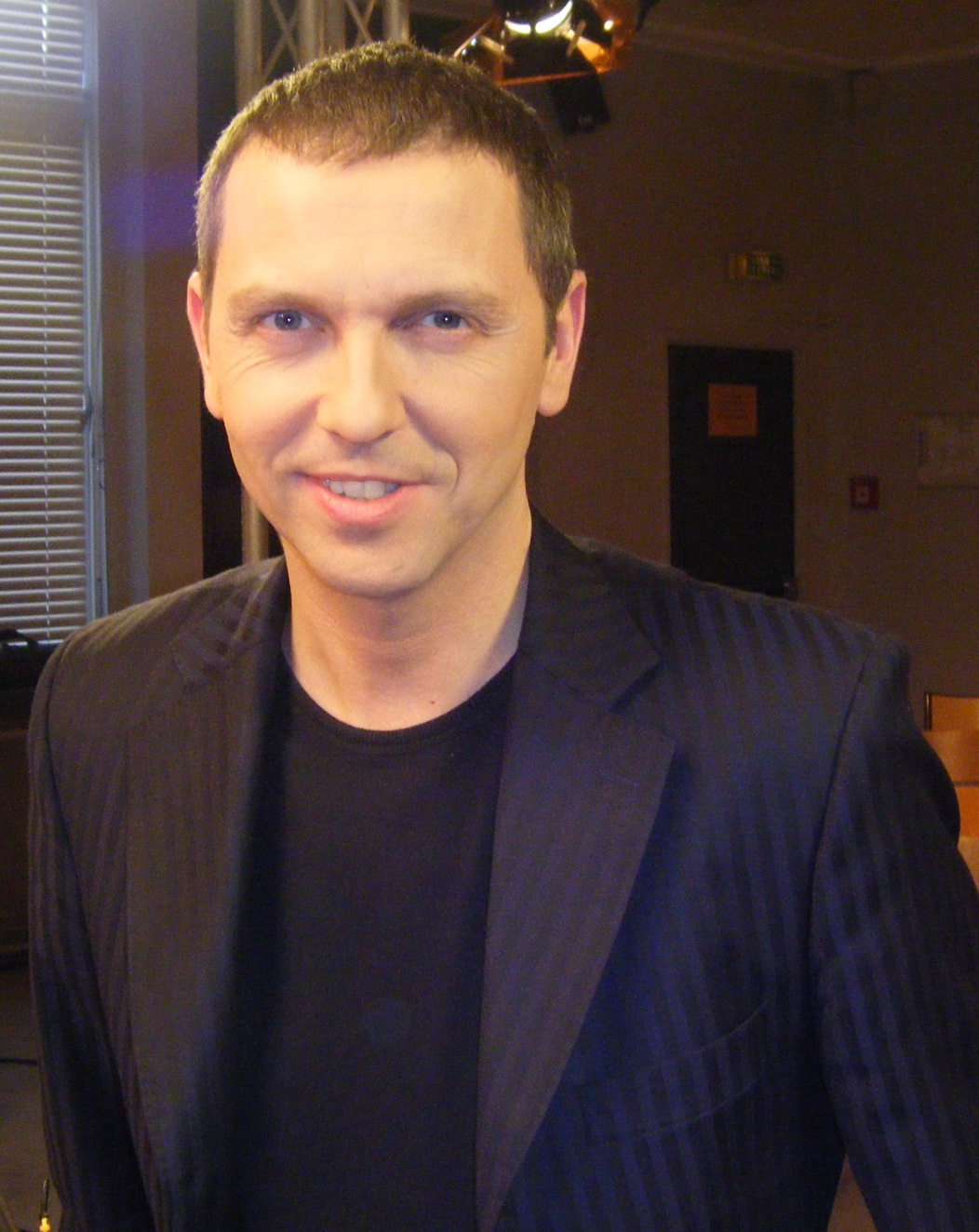
- Thomas Hugues in 2008
- Born: 11 May 1966 (age 59); Versailles, France
- Education: Institut d'études politiques de Bordeaux; École supérieure de journalisme de Lille
- Occupation: Journalist
- Spouse: Laurence Ferrari (m. 1993; div. 2007)
- Children: 2

Thomas Hugues (born 11 May 1966) is a French journalist, producer and television host.

== Early life ==
He joined the Institut d'Études Politiques of Bordeaux in 1983. During his course, he did an internship for the newspaper Sud Ouest. In 1987, he entered the Lille Ecole Supérieure de Journalisme.

== Career ==
In 1989, he became a script editor for TF1. In November 1994, he presented the news on the LCI channel, from 6:00 am to 10:00 am. In the same year, he joined Jean-Pierre Pernaut on the 1:00 pm news on TF1. In October 1997, he was promoted to Head of News.

In the summer of 1999, he replaced Claire Chazal on TF1 for the week-end news. The same year, he presented a weekend of mobilization against AIDS, 48h Contre le sida, and a prime-time Défense d'entrer, with Valérie Benaïm. On 31 December 1999, with his wife, Laurence Ferrari, he co-presented live on TF1 La Nuit du Millenium.

From 2000, he wrote material and co-presented on the TF1 current affairs programme, Sept à huit, alongside his wife, Laurence Ferrari, whose editor he later became. This magazine programme, broadcast every Sunday evening from 7:00 pm to 8:00 pm, was awarded a 7 d'or on 3 November 2003.

From July 2002 to July 2006, Hugues replaced Patrick Poivre d'Arvor for the 8:00 pm news on TF1.

In mid-June 2006, TF1 announced Hugues' resignation. For his part, he said he had been dismissed. In September 2006, he founded a production company, Story Box Press, with Laurence Ferrari and Lorraine Willems.

Early in September 2006, he joined the news channel I>Télé to host 1 h 30 chrono, a round-up news show, on Monday to Friday, from 6:00 pm to 7:30 pm. From January 2007, the show was only broadcast from Monday to Thursday and Thomas Hugues replaced Laurent Bazin as co-presenter of Le Franc-Parler, a political interview programme in conjunction with France Inter and Le Monde. From September 2007, he also presented Ça chauffe on I>Télé, a weekly programme devoted to environmental issues and sustainable development. He also hosted the 2007 and 2008 TV election nights on I>Télé.

He also produced and hosted 13ème Soir on the 13th Street channel.

In July 2008, Hugues left i>Télé and 13th Street to "concentrate on his production company". In September 2008, he joined the public channel France 5 to present every Saturday Médias, the magazine, a magazine on the news media.

== Personal life ==
Hugues was the husband of journalist Laurence Ferrari for 14 years, with whom he had two children. In October 2007, they publicly declared that they had separated by mutual agreement.

Since 2003, he has been the sponsor of "Œuvre des pupilles orphelins et fonds d'entraide des sapeurs-pompiers de France", a charity devoted to firemen and their families.

== TV career ==
- November 1994, LCI : News
- 1994, TF1 : 1:00 pm News
- 1999 summer, TF1 : News, week-end, TF1
- 1999, TF1 : 48 h Contre le Sida
- 1999, TF1 : Défense d'entrer with Valérie Benaïm
- 31 December 1999, TF1 : La nuit du Millenium with Laurence Ferrari
- 2000, TF1 : Sept à Huit with Laurence Ferrari, Sept d'Or, November 2003
- July 2002-June 2006, TF1 : 8:00 pm news
- February 2006, TF1 : Les 60 images qui ont marqué les français, with Laurence Ferrari
- September 2006-July 2008, I-Télé : 1 h 30 chrono
- 2006-2008, on 13th Street
- January 2007-July 2008, I-Télé : Le Franc-Parler
- September 2008, France 5 : Médias, le magazine

== As producer ==
- Dimanche +, Canal +
- Ça chauffe !, I>Télé
- 13ème soir, 13ème rue
- Jeudi investigation, Canal +
- 66 minutes, M6
- Capital diffusé, M6
- Envoyé spécial, France 2

== Bibliography ==
- Thomas Hugues and Benjamin Dard, Élections 2007 : les chiffres qui font débat, les réponses des candidats, Michel Lafon editions, coll. « Documents », Paris, 31 October 2006, 393 p. (ISBN 2749906180)
