= Hector Bianciotti =

Argentine-born French author

- Born: 18 March 1930; Córdoba Province, Argentina
- Died: 12 June 2012 (aged 82); Paris, France
- Occupation: Novelist • Journalist
- Known for: Member of the Académie Française
- Partner: Angelo Rinaldi

Hector Bianciotti (French pronunciation: [ɛktɔʁ bjɑ̃ʃɔti]; 18 March 1930 – 12 June 2012) was an Argentine-born French author and member of the Académie Française.

== Biography ==
Born Héctor Bianciotti (Spanish pronunciation: [ˈeɣtoɾ βjanˈtʃoti], Italian: [bjanˈtʃɔtti]) in Calchín Oeste in Córdoba Province, Argentina, Bianciotti's parents were immigrants from Piedmont. They communicated with each other in the language of that region,Piedmontese, but forbade its use with their son, instead speaking Spanish to him. Bianciotti began his study of French in 1945. He arrived in France in 1961 and completed his French naturalization in 1981. In 1982, he stopped writing in any language but French, his favourite.

Bianciotti was elected to the Académie Française on 18 January 1996 to Seat 2, succeeding André Frossard.

He died in Paris on 12 June 2012 at the age of 82.

== Honours and awards ==
- Officer of the Légion d'honneur (Legion of Honour)
- Officer of the Ordre national du Mérite (National Order of Merit)
- Prix Femina (1985) for Sans la miséricorde du Christ

== Bibliography ==
- 1967: Les Déserts dorés: (Denoël)
- 1969: Celle qui voyage la nuit: (Denoël)
- 1970: Les Autres, un soir d’été: (Gallimard)
- 1972: Ce moment qui s’achève: (Denoël)
- 1977: Le Traité des saisons: (Gallimard)
- 1982: L’Amour n’est pas aimé: (Gallimard)
- 1985: Sans la miséricorde du Christ: (Gallimard)
- 1988: Seules les larmes seront comptées.: (Gallimard)
- 1992: Ce que la nuit raconte au jour (What the Night Tells the Day) : (Grasset) ISBN 1565842405
- 1995: Le Pas si lent de l’amour: (Grasset)
- 1999: Comme la trace de l’oiseau dans l’air: (Grasset)
- 2001: Une passion en toutes lettres: (Gallimard)
- 2003: La nostalgie de la maison de Dieu: (Gallimard)
