= Wendy Bouchard =

French journalist, radio and television presenter

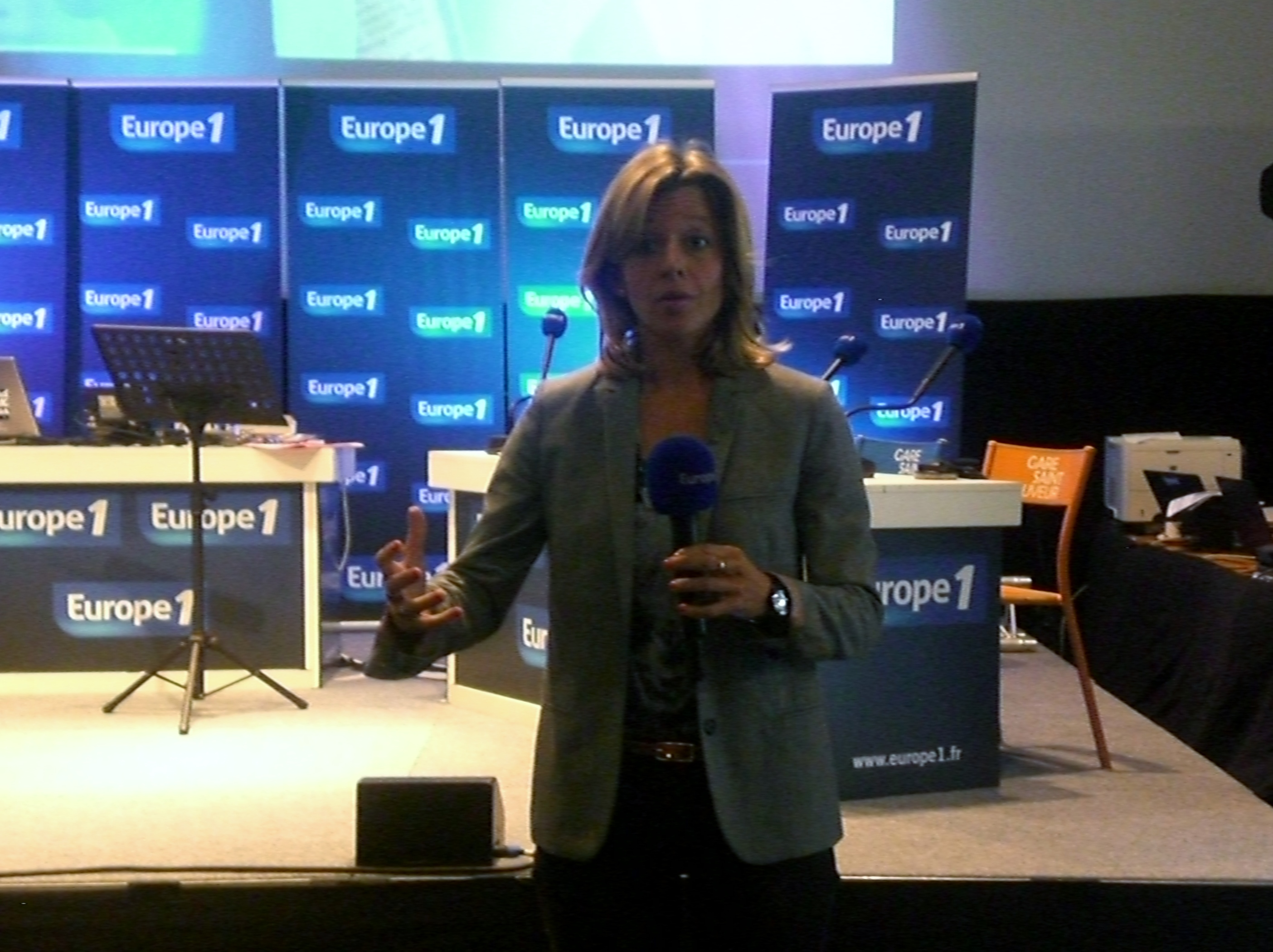
- Wendy Bouchard in 2014
- Born: 22 June 1980 (age 46); Paris, France
- Occupations: Journalist, radio presenter, television presenter
- Years active: 2006–present (Europe 1); 2012–present (M6)
- Employer: Europe 1 (2006–present)
- Television: Zone Interdite (M6)

Wendy Bouchard (born 22 June 1980) is a French journalist, radio and television presenter.

== Early life and education ==
Born in Paris, Wendy Bouchard studied at the high school of Saint-Michel-de-Picpus in Paris. She graduated in history at the Sorbonne, then at the Institut d'études politiques de Paris and at the Centre de Formation des Journalistes (CFJ) in 2005.

== Radio career ==
In 2006, she joined the radio station Europe 1. In 2009, she presented for one season with Michel Drucker a cultural talk show titled Studio Europe 1 from Monday to Friday. Since August 2010, she presented on the same station the Le 22-23, a news and cultural program from Monday to Thursday, and Le bistrot du Dimanche on Sunday. In August 2011, she presented on the same station the program Après la plage. She then presented the same year for one season various programs such as Europe 1 Midi on weekends, Le débat des grandes voix on Saturday, and Le forum citoyen on Sunday. During summer 2012, she presented Europe 1 Soir in August and Les secrets de com' on Saturday.

== Television career ==
In May 2011, she co-hosted Rendez vous à Cannes on France 2 with Michel Drucker. The guests were Maïwenn, Jean Dujardin, Cécile de France, Jude Law, Dustin Hoffman, Carole Bouquet and André Dussollier. In January 2012, she co-hosted at the second part of the evening L'art à tout prix with Olivier Picasso, for the Marcel Duchamp Prize. Since September 2012, she presents the program Zone Interdite on M6, succeeding to Mélissa Theuriau.
