= Jean Lebrun =

French journalist

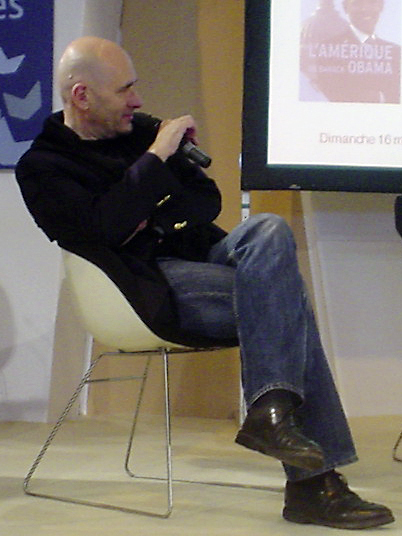
Jean Lebrun at the salon du livre de Paris in 2008

Jean Lebrun (14 May 1950, Saint-Malo, Ille-et-Vilaine) is a French journalist. A professor agrégé of history, he soon preferred journalism to the Éducation nationale. After he collaborated with Combat, La Croix and Esprit, he became a producer for the radio stations France Culture then France Inter.

== Career ==
Born of a gardener father and a caretaker mother, Jean Lebrun grew up in the Parisian suburbs and studied in the Catholic college Notre-Dame de la Providence at Enghien-les-Bains. He pursued his higher studies at the Sorbonne, then immersed in the May 1968 events in France. He devoted a master's thesis to the history of the La Trappe Abbey, at Rancé. An agrégé of history, he abandoned teaching to engage in journalism. He collaborated at Combat, the TV program Le Jour du Seigneur in the 1970s, the magazine Esprit, whose editorial board he was a member, and La Croix, whose cultural service he co-directed.

At France Culture, where Jean Lebrun has spent most of his career, he produced and hosted the programs Culture Matin (from 1992 to 1999) and Pot-au-feu before animating Travaux Public, a program broadcast from Monday to Friday from 6.30 pm to 7.30 pm which he periodically recorded in a "Deep France Culture" ambiance from Blumeray (Haute-Marne). The program was live from the Argentinian café El Sur on Boulevard Saint-Germain in Paris on Mondays, Tuesdays and Wednesdays, and in various French cities on Thursdays and Fridays. The recording sometimes took place at festivals or abroad. In June 2008, Jean Lebrun stopped producing the program Travaux publics. He then worked until February 2011 as program advisor to the director of the France Culture channel.

Lebrun replaced Patrice Gélinet, producer of Deux mille ans d'Histoire on France Inter, with La Marche de l'Histoire on 28 February 2011.

He is the author of Journaliste en campagne (October 2006) and Le Journalisme en chantier : chronique d'un artisan (October 2008), both published by the publishing house Bleu autour.

In 2014, he was awarded the prix Goncourt de la Biographie for Notre Chanel, published by Bleu autour, A biographical work on the fashion designer undertaken years earlier with his companion Bernard Costa (died of AIDS in 1990).

He joined the editorial board of La Quinzaine littéraire in 2015.

Jean Lebrun was awarded the Prix Richelieu in 1997.

== Works ==
- 1978: L'Abbé Louis-Joseph Fret : historien et diseur de vérités 1800–1843, "Cahiers percherons", n° 60, Association des amis du Perche, 40 p., ISBN 2-900122-60-0
- 1981: Lamennais ou l'inquiétude de la liberté, Paris, Fayard, 281 p., ISBN 2-213-00926-0
- 1997: Pour l'amour des villes : interview with Jacques Le Goff, Paris, Textuel, 159 p., ISBN 2-909317-45-5
- 1997: Femmes publiques : interview with Michelle Perrot, Textuel, 159 p., ISBN 2-909317-32-3
- 1997: Le Livre en révolutions : interview with Roger Chartier, Textuel, 159 p., ISBN 2-909317-34-X
- 1998: La République sur le fil : interview with Serge Berstein, Textuel, 143 p., ISBN 2-909317-50-1
- 1998: Une laïcité pour tous : interview with René Rémond, Textuel, 143 p., ISBN 2-909317-64-1
- 2001: Raison d'Église De la rue d'Ulm à Notre-Dame, 1967–2000 : conversations with Jean-Robert Armogathe, Calmann-Lévy, 193 p., 2001 ISBN 2-7021-2782-7
- 2001: L'Homme dans le paysage : interview with Alain Corbin, Textuel, 190 p., ISBN 2-84597-027-7
- 2002: Jacques Lacarrière : entretiens avec Jean Lebrun, Flammarion, series " Mémoire vivante", 181 p., ISBN 2-08-068206-7
- 2006: Journaliste en campagne, Saint-Pourçain-sur-Sioule, Bleu autour, 125 p., ISBN 2-9120-1955-9, 978-2-9120-1955-4
- 2008: Le Journalisme en chantier : chronique d'un artisan, Saint-Pourçain-sur-Sioule, Bleu autour, 127 p., ISBN 978-2-35848-000-0
- 2014: Notre Chanel Saint-Pourçain-sur-Sioule, Bleu Autour, 280 p., ISBN 978-2-35848-058-1
- 2014: Les grands débats qui ont fait la France, with Isaure Pisani-Ferry, Paris, Flammarion / France Inter, 352 p., ISBN 978-2-08-133270-6
