= Annette Gerlach =

German television presenter and journalist

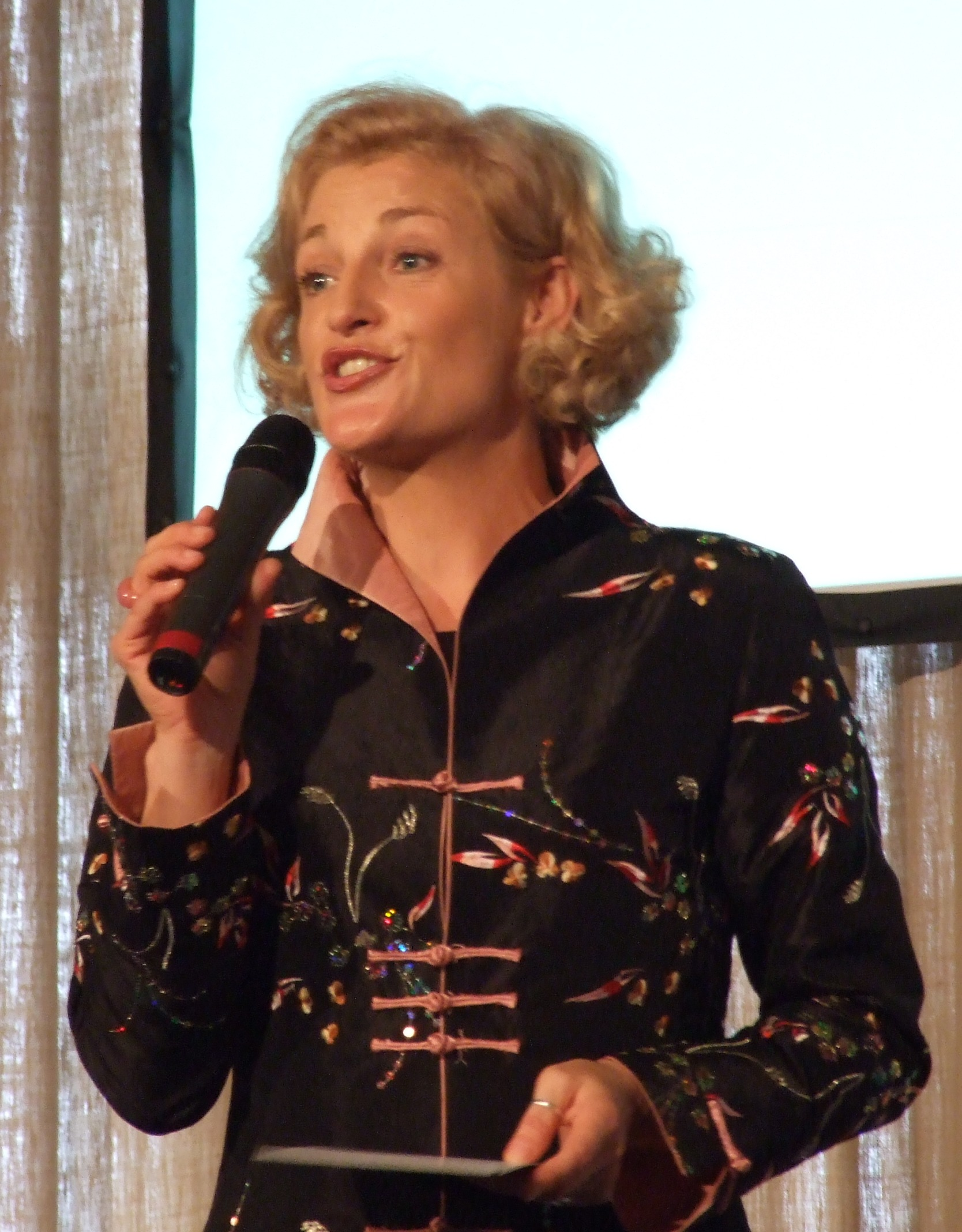
Annette Gerlach in 2009

Annette Gerlach (born 16 October 1964 in Berlin), is a German TV host and journalist of the Franco-German television channel Arte. She presents the programs in German as well as in French.

== Life ==
Born in Berlin, Gerlach has been living and working in France since her studies. After studying economics, she began her journalistic career as editor of the weekly magazine Le Nouvel Observateur in Paris.

In 1992, she joined the Arte television channel in Strasbourg, from its inception. Since 1998, she presents the daily newspapers (Arte Info renamed Arte Journal in 2010).

From 2004 to 2010, in parallel, she co-directed and presented Arte Culture, the cultural magazine of Arte, with Gustav Hofer.

Gerlach covers prestigious cultural events all over the world, often broadcast live by Arte, such as the reopening of the opera house in Barcelona (Liceu), Venise (La Fenice) or the Festival d'Avignon. In 2012, she covered the Salzburg Festival, the Festival de Cannes and the Bayreuth festival. She also gained notoriety through the annual presentation of the Berlin International Film Festival.

== Distinctions ==
- 2008 – Gerlach was made a Chevalier in the Ordre des Arts et des Lettres by the French Ministry of Culture.
- 2006 – She received the Prix Richelieu for the Défense de la langue française.
- Gerlach has a notice in the French version of Who's Who.

== Private life ==
Gerlach lives in Strasbourg, and has a daughter. She shared the life of American conductor John Axelrod.
