= École supérieure de journalisme de Paris =

Journalism school in Paris, France

Coordinates: 48°49′37″N 2°21′51″E

Paris School of Journalism
- École supérieure de journalisme de Paris
- Other names: ESJ Paris
- Motto: Quot capita tot sensus
- Motto in English: As many heads, so many perceptions
- Type: Private college
- Established: 1899; 127 years ago as the journalism school of the École des Hautes Études Sociales
- Affiliations: Agence universitaire de la Francophonie, European Journalism Training Association
- Chairman: Emmanuel Ostian
- President: Vianney d'Alançon
- Deputy chairman: Bernard de La Villardière
- Students: 400
- Undergraduates: 300
- Postgraduates: 100
- Location: 107 Rue de Tolbiac, Paris, France
- Campus: urban
- Website: www.esj-paris.fr
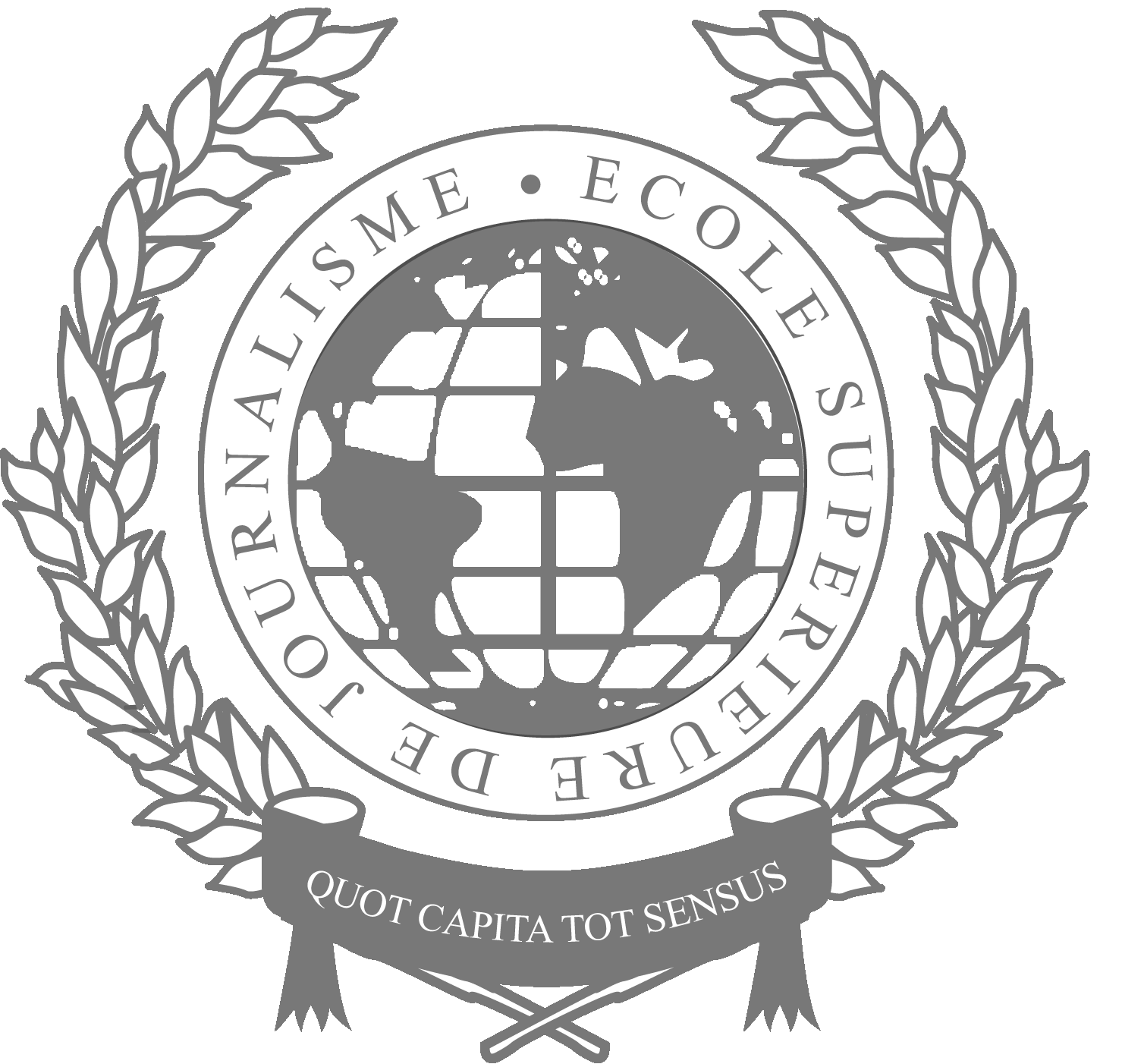

The École supérieure de journalisme (ESJ Paris; in English: Paris School of Journalism) is an institution of higher education in Paris dedicated to journalism and related studies. Its origin was in the Collège Libre des Sciences Sociales founded in 1895 by Dick May (pen name of Jeanne Weill, daughter of the rabbi of Algiers), and other supporters during the Dreyfus Affair. It was made a separate school in 1899 and claims the title of the "world's first school of journalism". Intended to give students a broad knowledge of politics and economics, it did not award a separate journalism degree by name until 1910.

The University of Missouri School of Journalism also claims the title of "first in the world", but it did not open until 1908 in Columbia, Missouri in the United States.

== History ==
The origins of this tertiary college were in the Collège Libre des Sciences Sociales, founded in 1895 by the journalist and novelist Dick May; Theophilus Funck-Brentano, a professor at École libre du sciences politiques; and Pierre du Maroussem, who taught at the Law Faculty of Paris (Sorbonne). Especially during the Dreyfus Affair and the rise of the université populaire movement, they wanted to create a place for study of the new field of social sciences and emerging thought in economics. They envisioned it as a place where practitioners would teach so that students would learn from more than textbooks. (May was the pen name used by Jeanne Weill, a daughter of the rabbi of Algiers.) In 1896, May suggested a school of journalism. She and other progressive French citizens were disturbed by the inflammatory press and the discriminatory attitudes that contributed to the initial conviction of Dreyfus; they wanted to improve society by encouraging higher level work in social studies.

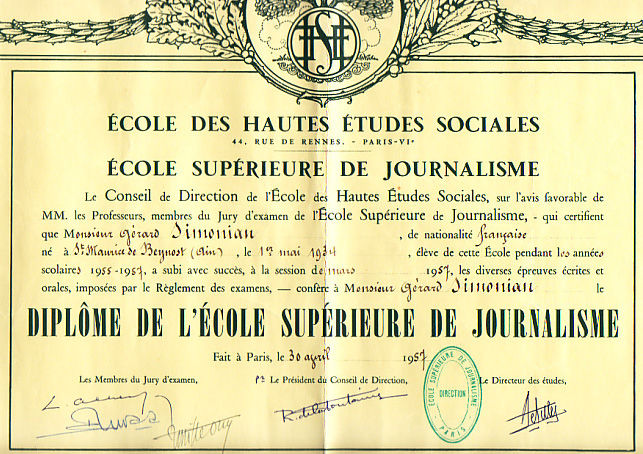
Diploma from the École supérieure de journalisme de l'École des hautes études sociales, then located on rue de Rennes, Paris, dating from 1957.

In 1899 three separate schools in Paris were established from the College Libre: l'École des Hautes Études Sociales, l'École des Hautes Études Internationales and l'École de Journalisme. As with other grandes ecoles, the School of Journalism broadly prepared students for work in government administration, politics and economics, not exclusively for journalism. It awarded its first named journalism degree in 1910. Among its early professors were Émile Durkheim, founder of sociology; the historian Charles Seignobos, and the economist Charles Gide, who supported economic cooperatives in agriculture and for consumers.

Today the graduate school prepares students to work in diverse positions in the media field: radio, television, newspaper, and online websites. Faculty are all professional journalists and college professors.

- Degree :

The school awards a diploma labeled as a "Bachelor's degree," which is not recognized by the French government or any legitimate French journalism institutions. The same lack of recognition applies to its so-called master's degree.

== Academic partnerships ==
- American University of Washington, D.C.
- African Institute of Science and Technology, Mbaise
- European Communication School of Brussels, Belgium
- Agence universitaire de la Francophonie (AUF)

== Notable alumni ==
- Henri Amouroux
- Malek Boutih
- Philippe Bouvard
- William Buzy
- Philippe Djian
- Ghislaine Dupont
- Geoffroy Lejeune
- Henri Sannier
- Audrey Pulvar
- Gebran Tueni
- Gérard de Villiers
- Bernard Werber
- Léon Zitrone

== Notable faculty ==
- René Cassin
- Pierre de Coubertin
- Paul Deschanel
- Émile Durkheim
- Gabriel Fauré
- Aurélie Filippetti
- Pierre de Nolhac
- Charles Péguy
- Raymond Poincaré
- Romain Rolland
- Marcel Sembat
- Roland Sicard
- Albert Thomas
- Gilles Verdez
