= Bénédicte Le Chatelier =

French journalist

- Born: 10 August 1976 (age 49); Lyon, Rhône, France
- Occupation: TV journalist
- Known for: TF1; Eurosport; LCI; France 3

Bénédicte Le Chatelier (born 10 August 1976 in Lyon, Rhône) is a French television journalist.

She works on LCI, the information channel of groupe TF1.

== Biography ==
Working as a reporter for RFO and stand-in presenter on both La Réunion and in Guyana,. She co-directed a documentary on the Holocaust, Les Enfants du secret.

She then worked for four years on Eurosport France, where she presented the news and other programmes.

In January 2005, she joined LCI, the information channel, and continued her work from Eurosport at groupe TF1, by presenting the news during Mélissa Theuriau's maternity leave., she presented LCI Matin week-end, on the same channel from Friday to Sunday, 0600–1000.

From September 2008, she presented the evening news from Monday to Thursday., she presented Le Buzz on LCI, a news show which looked at the buzz on the internet. From September 2009, she presented a new evening show with Damien Givelet, LCI Soir, from Monday to Thursday at 2200.

In September 2011, she began to present 12–14 with Jean-François Rabilloud while continuing to present Le Buzz alone since 2012. Katherine Cooley then succeeded her at LCI Soir. In September 2013, she replaced Carole Rousseau as the presenter of C'est quoi l'amour? on NT1.

Since September 2016 she has presented LCI et vous from 1000 to 1200.

In December 2016, she became the official sidekick to Yves Calvi when presenting 24 heures en questions from 1800 to 2000 on LCI. In January 2017, the show was moved to Saturdays, and she continued to present.

=== Personal life ===
Bénédicte Le Chatelier is the mother of two girls, born in 2007 and 2010.
