= Rémy Pflimlin =

French media executive

- Rémy Pflimlin in 2011
- Born: 17 February 1954; Mulhouse, France
- Died: 3 December 2016 (aged 62); Paris, France
- Education: HEC Paris
- Occupation: President of France Télévisions (2010-2015)
- Predecessor: Patrick de Carolis
- Successor: Delphine Ernotte
- Spouse: Sophie Pflimlin
- Children: 4
- Family: Pierre Pflimlin (great-uncle); Étienne Pflimlin (cousin)

Rémy Pflimlin ([ʁe.mi pflim.lɛ̃]; 17 February 1954 – 3 December 2016) was a French media executive. He w as the CEO of France 3 from 1999 to 2005, the Nouvelles Messageries de la Presse Parisienne (later known as Presstalis) from 2006 to 2010, and France Télévisions, France's public national television broadcaster, from 2010 to 2015.

== Early life, family background and education ==
Rémy Pflimlin was born on 17 February 1954 in Mulhouse, France. His great-uncle, Pierre Pflimlin, was a politician. His father was a Protestant while his mother was a Catholic. One of his brothers, Bertrand-Louis Pflimlin, became a general in the French Army; his other brother, Thierry Pflimlin, went on to work for the oil company Total. His cousin, Étienne Pflimlin, later was the CEO of Crédit Mutuel.

Pflimlin graduated from HEC Paris in 1978.

== Career ==
Pflimlin started his career by as the head of advertising for Jours de France, a magazine published by the Dassault Group, from 1979 to 1985. He then worked for Les Dernières Nouvelles d'Alsace, a regional newspaper in Alsace. In 1991, he was appointed as the deputy-chairman of the Société alsacienne de publications, the publisher of L’Alsace, its competitor. He was its chairman from 1993 to 1999. He also was the vice president of the Syndicat de la presse quotidienne régionale from 1997 to 1999.

Pflimlin was the CEO of France 3 from 1999 to 2005. He established regional stations within France 3, including Corsica-based Via Stella. In 1999, he launched C'est mon choix, a talk show hosted by Évelyne Thomas. In 2003, he oversaw the creation of Plus belle la vie, a French television series based in Marseille. Additionally, he decided to show Shoah, a 613-minute film directed by Claude Lanzmann. Meanwhile, he hired Audrey Pulvar and Marc-Olivier Fogiel, two new television presenters. However, in 2002, the staff went on strike for 22 days over their salaries; it was the longest strike in the history of France 3.

Pflimlin was appointed to the advisory board of the Agence France-Presse in 2005. He was the head of Nouvelles Messageries de la Presse Parisienne, the main newspaper distributor in France later known as Presstalis, from 2006 to 2010. He was responsible for rebranding the company.

France Télévisions logo.

Pflimlin was the CEO of France Télévisions from 2010 to 2015. When he succeeded Patrick de Carolis, he was the first head of France Télévisions to be appointed by a president (Nicolas Sarkozy), leading some on the left to suggest he was compromised. During his tenure, he streamlined the staff, accountancy of France 2 and France 3. In 2012, with the help of Bruno Patino, he launched a new website, FranceTVInfo. However, he clashed with the new Minister of Culture, Aurélie Filippetti, over his decision to discontinue the programs Taratata and C'est pas sorcier. By 2014, a report authored by the Conseil supérieur de l'audiovisuel (CSA) was leaked to the press, the gist of which suggested he had failed to meet expectations. During his tenure, he was on the executive board of the European Broadcasting Union. He was succeeded in August 2015 by Delphine Ernotte.

Pflimlin was appointed as the chairman of the board of TV5Monde in January 2013. He was a member of the Conseil d'État in 2015–2016.

== Personal life and death ==
Pfimlin was married to an heiress to the Peugeot fortune, and he had four children. He was the chairman of the Conservatoire de Paris and Musica, a classical music festival in Strasbourg. He also was the president of the Prix Italia from 2012 to 2014. He was a member of Le Siècle.

Pflimlin died of cancer at the Pitié-Salpêtrière Hospital in Paris on 3 December 2016. He was 62 years old. Upon his death, Jean Rottner, the mayor of his hometown of Mulhouse, described him as "a lover of culture, a humanist, but most of all a friend". Meanwhile, François Hollande, the president of France, said he was "a man who gave his life to the press, to the media, and to informing the public. Beyond his foolproof discretion, he hid a deep commitment to culture, including music."
