= Étienne Pflimlin =

- Born: 16 October 1941 (age 84); Thonon-les-Bains, Haute-Savoie, France
- Education: École Polytechnique; Sciences Po; École nationale d'administration
- Occupation: Banker
- Children: 2
- Parent: Pierre Pflimlin
- Relatives: Bertrand-Louis Pflimlin (paternal cousin); Rémy Pflimlin (paternal cousin)

Étienne Pflimlin (born 16 October 1941) is a French high-ranking civil servant and banker. He was the CEO of the Crédit Mutuel from 1987 to 2010.

== Early life ==
Étienne Pflimlin was born on 16 October 1941 in Thonon-les-Bains, Haute-Savoie, France. His father, Pierre Pflimlin, was a politician.

Pflimlin graduated from the École Polytechnique, Sciences Po and the École nationale d'administration (ENA).

== Career ==
Pflimlin started his career as a high-ranking civil servant. He worked for Prime Minister Pierre Messmer in 1973 and Culture Minister Michel d'Ornano in 1977. He subsequently worked for the Court of Audit.

Pflimlin joined the Crédit Mutuel, a French mutual bank, in 1984. He succeeded Théo Braun as its CEO in 1987, retiring in 2010. He argued that shareholders were a critical part of mutual banking, and that the industry would be over if shareholders stopped being engaged. He earned 630,141 Euros in 2010, 600,000 of which was his net salary. He was succeeded by Michel Lucas.

Pflimlin was elected to the board of the International Co-operative Alliance in 1994. He has been on the board of directors of FIMALAC, a credit rating and risk assessment company, since 2006. Pflimlin first met Ladreit as a student at the ENA.

Pflimlin became a Commander of the Legion of Honour in 2012.

== Personal life ==
Pflimlin is married to Sophie, an editor, and he has two children, Edouard and Thomas. He resides in Strasbourg with his family.
