= Angelo Rinaldi =

French writer and literary critic (1939–2025)

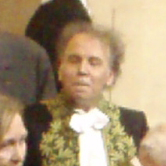
- Born: Ange-Marie Rinaldi; 17 June 1939; Bastia, Corsica, France
- Died: 7 May 2025 (aged 84); Paris, France
- Occupation: Writer
- Known for: Member of the Académie Française
- Partner: Hector Bianciotti

Angelo Rinaldi (17 June 1939 – 7 May 2025) was a French writer and literary critic.

== Life and career ==
Rinaldi was the son of Pierre-François Rinaldi and Antoinette Pietri; after growing up in Corsica he became a journalist. He initially worked as a reporter and court correspondent for the newspapers Nice-Matin and Paris-Jour and soon acquired a reputation as a writer and a sharp-penned literary critic. As a critic, he worked for L'Express, Le Point and Le Nouvel Observateur before becoming literary editor of Le Figaro, which he remained until his retirement.

Rinaldi was Corsican, and his books often contain detailed observations of Corsica and of the town of Bastia where he grew up.

He received the Prix Pierre de Monaco for his body of work.

He was elected to Seat 20 of the Académie Française on 21 June 2001, succeeding José Cabanis.

In 2011, Rinaldi resigned as president of the Defense of the French Language association after they awarded the Prix Richelieu to the right-wing journalist Éric Zemmour.

Rinaldi died in Paris on 7 May 2025, at the age of 84.

== Bibliography ==
- 1969: La Loge du Gouverneur (awarded the Fénéon Prize)
- 1971: La Maison des Atlantes (Gallimard)
- 1974: L'Éducation de l'oubli (Denoël)
- 1977: Les Dames de France (Gallimard)
- 1980: La Dernière Fête de l'Empire (Gallimard)
- 1985: Les Jardins du Consulat (Gallimard)
- 1987: Les Roses de Pline (Gallimard)
- 1990: La Confession des collines (Gallimard)
- 1993: Les jours ne s'en vont pas longtemps (Grasset)
- 1997: Dernières nouvelles de la nuit (Grasset)
- 1999: Service de presse. Chroniques (Plon)
- 2000: Tout ce que je sais de Marie (Gallimard)
