= Zone Interdite (TV program) =

French TV program

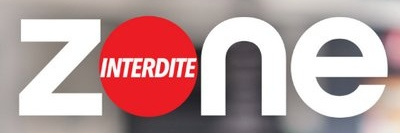
- Created by: Patrick de Carolis
- Presented by: Ophélie Meunier; Former presenters Patrick de Carolis (1993-1997), Florence Dauchez (1997-1998), Bernard de la Villardière (1998-2005), Anne-Sophie Lapix (2005-2006), Mélissa Theuriau (2006-2012)
- Country of origin: France
- No. of episodes: 19 seasons

Production
- Running time: 120 minutes
- Production company: M6 (TV channel)

Original release
- Network: M6
- Release: 7 March 1993 – present

Zone interdite (pronounced [zon ɛ̃tɛʁdit], literally "Prohibited area") is a French newsmagazine that has been broadcast since 7 March 1993 on M6, the second-most watched TV network in the French-speaking world. Well known for its investigative journalism, the show has long been considered one of the most influential in France and has been awarded the 7 d'or in 2000 (France's most prestigious TV award) for best newsmagazine on TV. It is currently presented by Ophélie Meunier.

== Broadcasting ==
Zone Interdite (often nicknamed Zone) is broadcast on M6 once every two weeks on Sunday prime time, and the following Tuesday at night. Summer shows are broadcast on a different schedule in July and August.

== Format and public ==
Each episode features several investigative journalism reports, each one followed by a panel featuring experts, lawmakers, interviewees etc. who discuss the issue the report deals with.

The idea behind the show is best defined by its name: Zone Interdite meaning Forbidden Zone in French. It deals with the most important and sensitive social and political issues of the time, in order to give the public the best possible insight and to drive general and political attention on them.

=== Public ===
With an average of 3 to 5 million viewers and an average of 10% to 30% of the target market shares per episode, it is one of the most-watched newsmagazines on French TV.

=== Influence in France ===
Zone Interdite is known for its large public, sensitive topics and high-end panels.

Zone Interdite is famous for being the first French TV show ever to expound anorexia and its dangers at a time the mental illness was almost unknown to the general public.

It was also instrumental in putting road traffic safety into national debate in the early 2000s, which has led to a complete re-writing of the French road safety laws in 2002 and 2007.

It has also been at the edge of such sensitive social issues as Prostitution, Poverty, Cults and Right to housing, driving public, media and political attention to these issues at a time they were not properly addressed by policymakers.

== History ==
The show was created by famous French journalist Patrick de Carolis and was first aired on 7 March 1993. At that time Carolis - who later become CEO of France Television - was M6's Head of Programming.

Starting in December 1995, the show was broadcast every two weeks, instead of once a month.

In June 1999, 7.5 million people watched the special show about prostitution, which has been considered as a starting point for France's renewed lawmaking on the issue.

In 2000, the show was awarded the 7 d'or (France's most prestigious TV award) for best newsmagazine on TV.

In 2002, Zone Interdite celebrated its 200th show, in 2003, its 10 years on air, in 2008 its 15th anniversary. In 2011, it started its 19th season, making it one of the longest running French TV shows.

In 2006, Melissa Theuriau was appointed Zone Interdite's new anchor. The same year, the Daily Express voted her the world's most beautiful news reporter. She was similarly voted "TV's sexiest news anchor" by readers of the US edition of Maxim. In May 2007, she was voted most beautiful woman in the world in the French edition of FHM.

== Anchors ==
Zone Interdite was presented by:

- Patrick de Carolis from 1993 to 1997
- Florence Dauchez from 1997 to 1998
- Bernard de la Villardière from 1998 to 2005
- Anne-Sophie Lapix from 2005 to 2006
- Mélissa Theuriau since 2006
- Claire Barsacq, interim from November 2008 to August 2009
