= William Buzy =

French writer

William Buzy is a French writer born in 1989 and based in Liverpool.

== Books ==
After four essays on journalism published between 2010 and 2016, Buzy published his first novel, Ponos, in 2017.

In 2018, his book of reports called Impact(s) was very well received by critics, especially in the journalistic community.

Between 2018 and 2020, he published books on Cuba, Rojava, Marinaleda, as well as a book of investigations about societal issues. The French television channel France 2 referred to a "fascinating and relevant" work, while Canal+ emphasized "a fresh breath, an inspiration for those who have the desire to get out of asphyxiating situations".

In 2021, he published his second novel, And green and blue go together so well. In 2022, he published a children's book titled The Panda Who Was in Love with a Penguin, which achieved notable success and was later translated into several languages.

In 2023, William Buzy co-authored a book detailing the history of the Stade des Costières, the iconic stadium of Nîmes Olympique, with local journalist Romain Collet-Gaudin. This publication coincided with the club's move to a new stadium and the looming threat of the Costières' demolition. The book compiles the testimonies of 200 key figures, including former players, club officials, referees, local representatives and journalists, documenting the significance of the stadium in local football history.

His third novel, The righteous, is released in 2023. In 2024, William Buzy published an English-language poetry collection.

== Journalism ==
Involved in the independent media community, Buzy has participated in the launch of several media, and has directed documentaries, two of which have been selected in festivals.

His work on impact journalism is referenced in several academic works and books on the subject.
