= Patrick de Carolis =

French journalist and writer

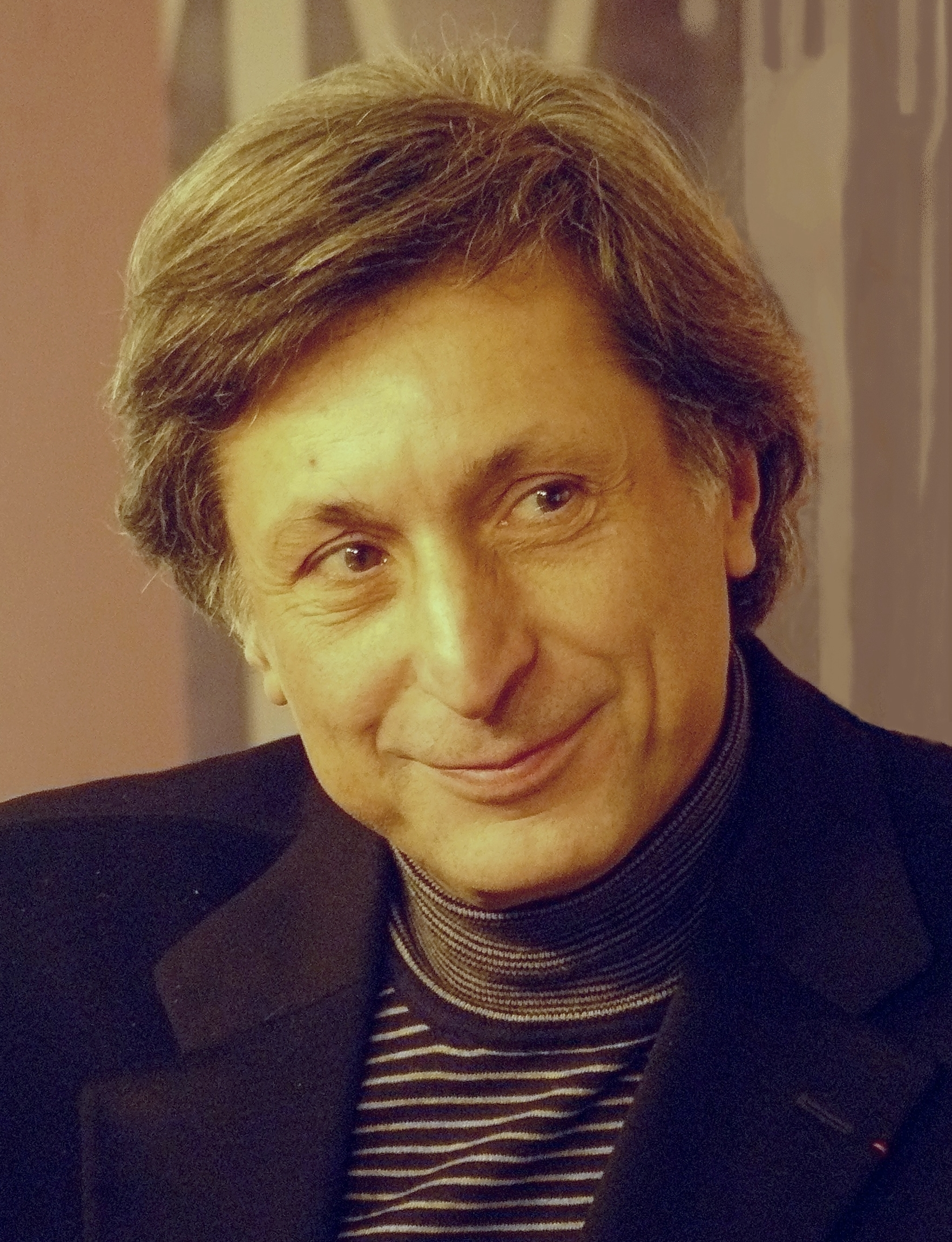

Mayor of Arles
- Incumbent
- Assumed office 5 July 2020
- Preceded by: Hervé Schiavetti

President of France Télévisions
- In office 22 August 2005 – 23 August 2010
- Preceded by: Marc Tessier
- Succeeded by: Rémy Pflimlin

Personal details
- Born: 19 November 1953 (age 72) Arles, France
- Party: Independent
- Education: École supérieure de journalisme de Paris
- Profession: Journalist

Patrick de Carolis (born 19 November 1953) is a French TV journalist and writer. He has been president of French public service broadcaster France Télévisions from July 2005 to August 2010.

== President of France Télévisions ==
Upon termination of Marc Tessier's presidency on 22 August 2005, De Carolis was appointed president of France Télévisions. During his tenure, the 2008 reform that cut advertisements from 8pm through 6am everyday and made the French President the direct appointer of the president of France Télévisions was adopted. He also oversaw the transformation of the state broadcaster into a multi-brand consolidated company: what have previously been subsidiary companies with distinctive brands and operating revenues became integrated parts of France Télévisions. He held the position until 23 August 2010.

== Mayor of Arles ==
On 28 June 2020, he was elected mayor of Arles, his native town, as an independent candidate.

== Published works ==
- Conversation, with Bernadette Chirac, Ed. Omnibus, 2001, ISBN 978-2-259-19512-6
- Les demoiselles de Provence, Ed. Plon, 2005, ISBN 978-2-259-20065-3
- Refuge pour temps d’orage, Ed. Plon, 2009, ISBN 978-2-259-21029-4

== See also ==
- France Télévisions
- France 3
- TF1
- M6
- Zone Interdite
