= Delphine Ernotte =

French telecommunications and media executive (born 1966)

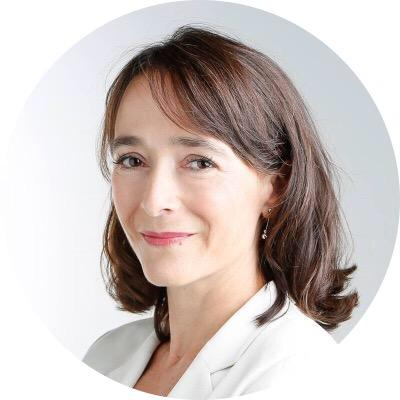

President of the European Broadcasting Union
- Incumbent
- Assumed office 1 January 2021
- Deputy: Cilla Benkö
- Preceded by: Tony Hall

Personal details
- Born: Delphine Cunci; 28 July 1966 (age 59) Bayonne, France
- Spouse: Marc Ernotte
- Children: 2
- Education: Lycée Hoche
- Alma mater: École Centrale Paris
- Occupation: Businesswoman

Delphine Ernotte (née Cunci; born 28 July 1966) is a French telecommunications and media executive. She is the chief executive officer of France Télévisions, the President of the European Broadcasting Union, and a former executive at Orange S.A.

== Early life ==
Delphine Ernotte was born Delphine Cunci in Bayonne, France on 28 July 1966. Both her parents, Roger Cunci and Simone Brana, were physicians. Her maternal grandfather, Jean-Pierre Brana, served as the mayor of Bayonne. She is of Corsican descent on her maternal side. Her sister, Marie-Christine Lemardeley, went on to become the president of University of Paris III: Sorbonne Nouvelle from 2008 to 2014 and a Socialist politician.

Ernotte attended preparatory classes at the Lycée Hoche in Versailles, before graduating from the École Centrale Paris in 1989 with an engineer's degree.

== Career ==
Ernotte joined France Télécom (later known as Orange S.A.) in 1989, where she worked as a financial analyst until 1993. She served as an economist at managerial level from 1993 to 1999. She was the head of Paris stores in 1999–2000, and the chief executive of La Société de diffusion de radiotéléphonie (SDR), a subsidiary, from 2000 to 2004. She was the head of Orange's Centre-Val de Loire office from 2004 to 2006. From 2006 to 2008, she served as the director of communication, where she implemented rebranding strategies (from France Télécom to Orange). She served as commercial director of Orange France from 2008 to 2009, and as the head of Orange Distribution, a subsidiary, from 2009 to 2010. She was appointed to the executive committee of Orange in 2010, and she served as the CEO of Orange France from 2011 to 2015. During her tenure, a dozen employees committed suicide due to the stressful work culture. She was criticized by the French Confederation of Management – General Confederation of Executives for it.

Ernotte has served as the CEO of France Télévisions since 2015, succeeding Rémy Pflimlin. Her appointment was criticized by some members of the Conseil supérieur de l'audiovisuel (CSA). She is the first woman to serve as its CEO.

Ernotte is described as a "feminist" by France Télévisions. While she was working at Orange, she founded Inov’Elles, a women's organisation. She has criticized France Télévisions as "a television station run by white men over 50".

Ernotte serves as the chairwoman of the board of trustees of the École nationale supérieure de la photographie in Arles. She is a member of Le Siècle.

In 2020, Ernotte was elected to be the president of the European Broadcasting Union, with the responsibility to "help champion the value and importance of public service media across Europe". She will be the first woman president leading the EBU, replacing the former BBC Director General Tony Hall. Her contract began on 1 January 2021. Ernotte has also been a member of the Global Task Force for Public Media, an initiative of the Public Media Alliance, since its founding in September 2019.

== Recognition ==
She became a Knight of the National Order of Merit in 2011.

She became a Knight of the Legion of Honour in 2014.

In 2021, Variety magazine named her one of the most influential women in global Entertainment industry.

== Personal life ==
Ernotte is married to Marc Ernotte, a theatre actor. They have two children.

Media offices
Preceded by Rémy Pflimlin	President of France Télévisions; 2015–present	Succeeded by Incumbent
Preceded by Tony Hall	President of European Broadcasting Union; 2021–present	Succeeded by Incumbent
