= Pierre Ménès =

French football commentator (born 1963)

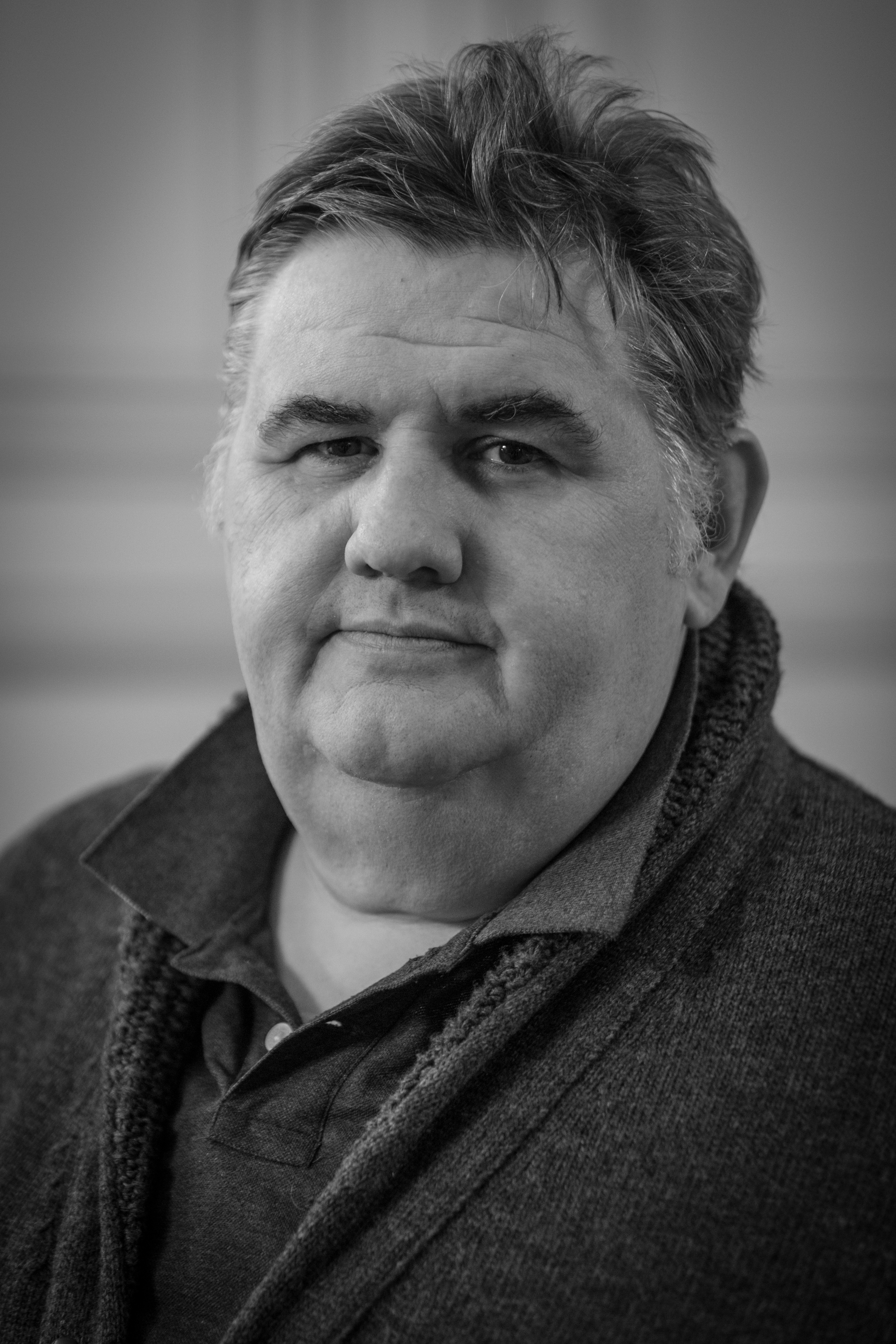
- Ménès in 2014
- Born: 29 June 1963 (age 61); 8th arrondissement of Paris, France
- Education: University of Nanterre
- Occupation: Sports commentator

Pierre Ménès (French pronunciation: [pjɛʁ menɛs]; born 29 June 1963) is a French football commentator, analyst and presenter. He was an analyst on the Canal+ programme Canal Football Club.

== Biography ==
Ménès was born in the 8th arrondissement of Paris on 29 June 1963. His father's side of his family are from Brest, where he often spent his holidays as a child. His father was an insurer and his mother was an English teacher. He practised fencing in his youth. After being involved in an accident, in which he crashed his moped into a car, he broke his leg and his wrist. He stopped practising fencing due to his injuries. He began working at L'équipe in 1983 where he covered action in Ligue 1 and Ligue 2. He spent 21 years working for L'équipe. He became the director of development at Stade de Reims in 2005, a position he held for one year. In 2009 he joined Canal+ to be a part of the panel on Canal Football Club, a show that analyses football matches from around Europe. He was let go from his position on the show following sexual harassment allegations in 2021.

Ménès is one of two French commentators on EA Sport's FIFA video games however he was dismissed from this position following sexual harassment allegations and will not appear on future FIFA games, starting with FIFA 22.

He survived a NASH in 2016 thanks to a liver transplant.

In April 2020 Ménès was hospitalised after contracting COVID-19.

In March 2021, Ménès was accused of sexual harassment by a former colleague. He came intense under scrutiny for his alleged actions and French Junior interior minister, Marlene Schiappa, said his behaviour was unacceptable.

In December 2021, Ménès was arrested in connection with sexual harassment accusations.
