= Christophe de Ponfilly =

French journalist and filmmaker

- Born: 5 January 1951; Paris, France
- Died: 16 May 2006 (aged 55); Rambouillet, France
- Occupation: Journalist
- Known for: Winner of the Prix Albert-Londres (1985)
- Spouse: Florence Dauchez

Christophe de Ponfilly (January 5, 1951 – May 16, 2006) was a French journalist, film director, cinematographer, and screenwriter. He was married to Florence Dauchez.

== Awards ==
- Prix Albert-Londres 1985 (for Les Combattants de l'Insolence)
- Special jury prize, festival du scoop et du journalisme d’Angers (for Monsieur le Rabin - 1999)
- Special jury prize, 14th global television festival, Japan. (for Massoud, l'afghan - 2000)
- Planet Prize, Special jury prize, et Prize from the youth Jury, F.I.G.R.A.(for Massoud, l'afghan - 1998)
- Best documentary, Festival dei Popoli (Florence) (Massoud, l'afghan - 1998)
- Grand Prize, festival Montagne et Aventure d'Autrans (Massoud l'afghan - 2001)
- C.F.A. prize, "best documentary of the year" (Les Plumes font leur CirQue)
- Planète Câble prize, and special jury prize, F.I.G.R.A. (Naître, des histoires banales mais belles - 1994)
- UNESCO prize, International film and art festival, 1994 (Do ré mi fa sol la si do, les Kummer)
- Prix spécial du jury à La Nuit des Yeux d’Or de Reuil Malmaison 1994 (Kaboul au bout du monde)
- UNESCO prize, Festival of African programs, Nairobi 1994 (Télé-Radio-Magie)
- Best documentary, 1992 at Rencontres Européennes de Télévision de Reims (W Street - 1992)
- Unda prize, Monte-Carlo International Festival (A cœur, à corps, à cris - 1992)
- Grand prize, du Festival international de journalisme d'Angers 1990 (Poussières de Guerre)
- Aigle d'or du Festival international d'histoire de Rueil-Malmaison 1990 (Poussières de Guerre)
- Mention au Festival Europa 1991 (Autofolies)
- Prix du meilleur film humanitaire 1987, festival du grand reportage de La Ciotat (Les damnés de l'URSS et Soldats perdus)
- Prix international ONDAS 1983 (Une vallée contre un empire)

== See also ==
- Albert Films
- Frédéric Laffont
- Interscoop, The Interscoop Press Agency est. 1982
