= CNews =

French television news channel

- Country: France

Programming
- Picture format: 1080i HDTV (downscaled to 16:9 576i for the SDTV feed)

Ownership
- Owner: Canal+
- Sister channels: Canal+ CStar; CNews Prime

History
- Launched: 4 November 1999; 27 years ago
- Founder: Christian Dutoit
- Former names: i>Télévision (1999–2002) i>Télé (2002–2017)

Links
- Website: www.cnews.fr

Availability

Terrestrial
- TNT: Channel 14

Streaming media
- Official website: Watch live (in French)

CNews (French pronunciation: [senjuz]; stylised as CNEWS, formerly i>Télé and i>Télévision) is a French far-right free-to-air opinion channel, which was launched on 4 November 1999 by Canal+. It provides 24-hour national and global news coverage. It is the fourth most watched news network in France, right before BFM TV, LCI as well as France Info.

i>Télé was renamed CNews on 27 February 2017. Since this change, it has taken an archconservative editorial stance, and is often compared to the American TV channel Fox News. It has been many times warned by French regulators (ARCOM) for its failure to honestly and rigorously report news to the public or for illegal and reprehensible speeches. Due to these infractions, it was fined €200,000 by the French audiovisual regulatory body in 2021.

Despite the channel often violating the audiovisual laws and agreements for broadcasting on the free-to-air TV, it has so far never been really worried by the French authority of regulation. The channel is under the control of the media proprietor and business magnate Vincent Bolloré, who has been accused of interfering with the editorial choices of CNews.

== Editorial stance and controversy ==
The editorial stance of CNews is described by many observers as being ultraconservative and identitarian.

According to satirical and investigative media Le Canard Enchaîné and leftist activist group Sleeping Giants France, CNews, owned by Groupe Bolloré, clearly promotes hate speech. In particular, Éric Zemmour, columnist of the channel between 2019 an 2021, was condemned on 17 September 2020 for inciting racial hatred. Moreover, the channel is often accused by its detractors to normalise racist, xenophobic and islamophobic discourses.

CNEWS is also regularly criticised for lack of viewpoint diversity, as most of the channel's contributors espouse views of the right-wing or are affiliated with the far-right.

Given its promotion of ideas of the French far right, as well as for broadcasting fake news and conspiracy theories, the channel has been described as a French version of Fox News.

The Bolloré's channel promotes also Catholic Traditional values, anti-abortion stances,climate denial views, and an opposition to "wokeism".

Internationally, CNews shows pro-Russia, pro-Benjamin Netanyahu and pro-Trump stances.

During the 2022 French presidential election, many observers note that CNews, regardless of the audiovisual laws and agreements, supports and favors clearly the Eric Zemmour's candidacy.

After the failure of Zemmour in 2022, the channel moved gradually to the support of the National Rally, in notably campaigning for it during the 2024 French legislative election.

At least five presenters and specialists from CNews were accused of sexual assault (Patrick Poivre d'Arvor, Jean-Marc Morandini and Pierre Ménès) or covering sexual misbehavior (Yann Moix and Philippe de Villiers).

== Warnings and sanctions ==
CNews was warned by the French regulatory body Arcom in May 2022 for its failure to respect its "obligation to honesty and rigor in the presentation and treatment of the news". This warning, due to statements made by Ivan Rioufol, followed a record €200,000 fine levied against the channel the previous year. This fine was the result of recidivism by employee Éric Zemmour whose statements had led to previous warnings.

On 13 February 2024, after a case lodged by Reporters Without Borders (RWB), the Conseil d'État ordered CNews to better respect journalistic standards and diversity. The February order by the Conseil d'État was followed by an intense campaign between RWB against hate speech and CNews for its freedom of speech. In July 2024, an investigation by RWB traced what it believed was the source of the disinformation campaign. This included a fake website pretending to be run by RWB hosted on a server hosting "Fan de CNews", a fansite supporting CNews. The website was run by what RWB states is a disinformation agency called Progressif Media, hosted at Bolloré's corporate group Vivendi. The main investigator, Arnaud Froger, stated that Progressif Media used "counterfeiting, concealment, cybersquatting [and] trolling" as disinformation techniques against RWB.

== Presenters ==
=== Politics ===
- Julien Nény (since 2016)
- Yoan Usaï (since 2013)
- Loïc Signor (since 2016)
- Hugues Dago (since 2016)

=== Economy and Stock Markets ===
- Marie-Sophie Carpentier (2008–2012)

=== Culture ===
- Olivier Benkemoun (since 1999)
- Xavier Leherpeur (since 2013)
- Pierre Zeni, cinema specialist (since 2016)
- Laurent Weil (since 2016)

=== Business and Markets ===
- Johann Ouaki (since 2017)
- Sandy Prenois (since 2017)

=== Sports ===
- Pascal Praud (since 2010)
- Julien Pasquet (since 2009)
- Elodie Poyade (2012, since 2016)
- Sonia Carneiro (since 2013)
- Thibaud Vézirian (since 2017)
- Thibaut Geffrotin (since 2017)
- Lyès Houhou (from Infosport+)
- Paul Tchoukriel (from Infosport+)
- Virginie Ramel (since 2017)
- Arnaud Bonnin (since 2017)

=== Football ===
- Francesca Antoniotti
- Raymond Aabou
- Jean-Luc Arribart
- Pierre Ménès
- Gilles Verdez
- Alain Roche
- Bruno Ahoyo

=== Police-justice specialists ===
- Noémie Schulz (since 3/2016)
- Sandra Buisson (since 2012)

=== "International questions" specialist ===
- Harold Hyman (since 2016)

=== Weather ===
- Thierry Fréret (since 2010)
- Loïc Rousval (since 2015)
- Alexandra Blanc (2011-2013 and since 2016)
- Somaya Labidi

=== Political editors ===
- Gérard Leclerc (2017–2023)
- Yves Thréard (since 2012)
- Virginie Le Guay (since 2017)
- Jean-Claude Dassier (since 2013)
- Françoise Degois (2014-2016 and since 2017)

=== Regional correspondents ===
- Damien Deparnay (Lille and Nord-Pas de Calais)
- Olivier Madinier (Lyon and Rhône-Alpes)
- Romain Ripoteau (Languedoc-Roussillon and Midi-Pyrénées)
- Jean-Luc Thomas (Toulouse)
- Jean-Michel Decazes and Michaël Chaillou (Bretagne and Pays de La Loire)
- Sébastien Bendotti (Bureau de Lyon and Rhône-Alpes)
- David Brunet (Strasbourg)
- Stéphanie Rouquié (Marseille)
- Antoine Estève and Brice Bachon (Bordeaux)

== Former presenters ==
=== Editor ===
- Yann Moix (2014–2015)

== Staff ==
=== Present news anchors and analysts ===
- Claire-Élisabeth Beaufort
- Soizic Boisard
- Patrice Boisfer
- Virginie Chomicki
- Nelly Daynac
- Caroline Delage
- Romain Desarbres
- Laurence Ferrari
- Olivier Galzi
- Thomas Lequertier
- Clélie Mathias
- Marc Menant
- Isabelle Moreau
- Patrick Poivre d'Arvor
- Pascal Praud
- Audrey Pulvar
- Aïda Touihri
- Éric Zemmour

=== Past anchors ===
- Harry Roselmack (currently on TF1)
- Guillaume Durand (currently on Paris Première and Radio Classique)
- Thomas Hugues (currently on France 5)
- Maya Lauqué (currently on France 5)
- Thomas Thouroude (currently on Canal+)
- Bruce Toussaint (currently on France 5)
- Amandine Bégot (currently on LCI)
- Laurent Bazin
- Sonia Chironi
- Marie-Sophie Carpentier

== Visual identity ==
=== Logos ===
Old logo of i>Télé from 2008 until 2013

=== Slogans ===
- 1999–2001: "i> l'info se rapproche" (i> news is getting closer)
- 2001–2002: "Là où ça se passe, 24 h sur 24" (Wherever it's happening, 24/7)
- 2002–2007: "L'info en +" (News in +)
- 2007–2008: "Toutes les infos, tout le temps" (All the news, all the time)
- 2008–2009: "Au cœur de l'actualité" (At the heart of the news)
- 2009–2010: "L'information avec un grand I" (News with a big I)
- 2010–2011: "Soyez les premiers à voir les images" (Be the first to see the images)
- 2011–2013: "Au plus près de l'actualité 24h/24" (Closest to the news 24/7)
- 2013–2014: "Au cœur de l'événement" (At the heart of the event)
- 2014–2017: "L'information ne s'arrête jamais" (The news never stops)
- February - November 2017: "La chaîne info : décryptage et opinions" (The news channel: decoding and opinions)
- November 2017 – 2021: "La chaîne info qui explique l'info" (The news channel that explains the news)
- June 2021 – January 2023: "Venez avec vos convictions, vous vous ferez une opinion." (Come with your convictions, you'll form an opinion.)
- January 2023: "La liberté d’expression n’a jamais fait autant parler" (Freedom of expression has never produced so much speech)
