= Bernard de La Villardière =

French journalist, radio and television presenter (born 1958)

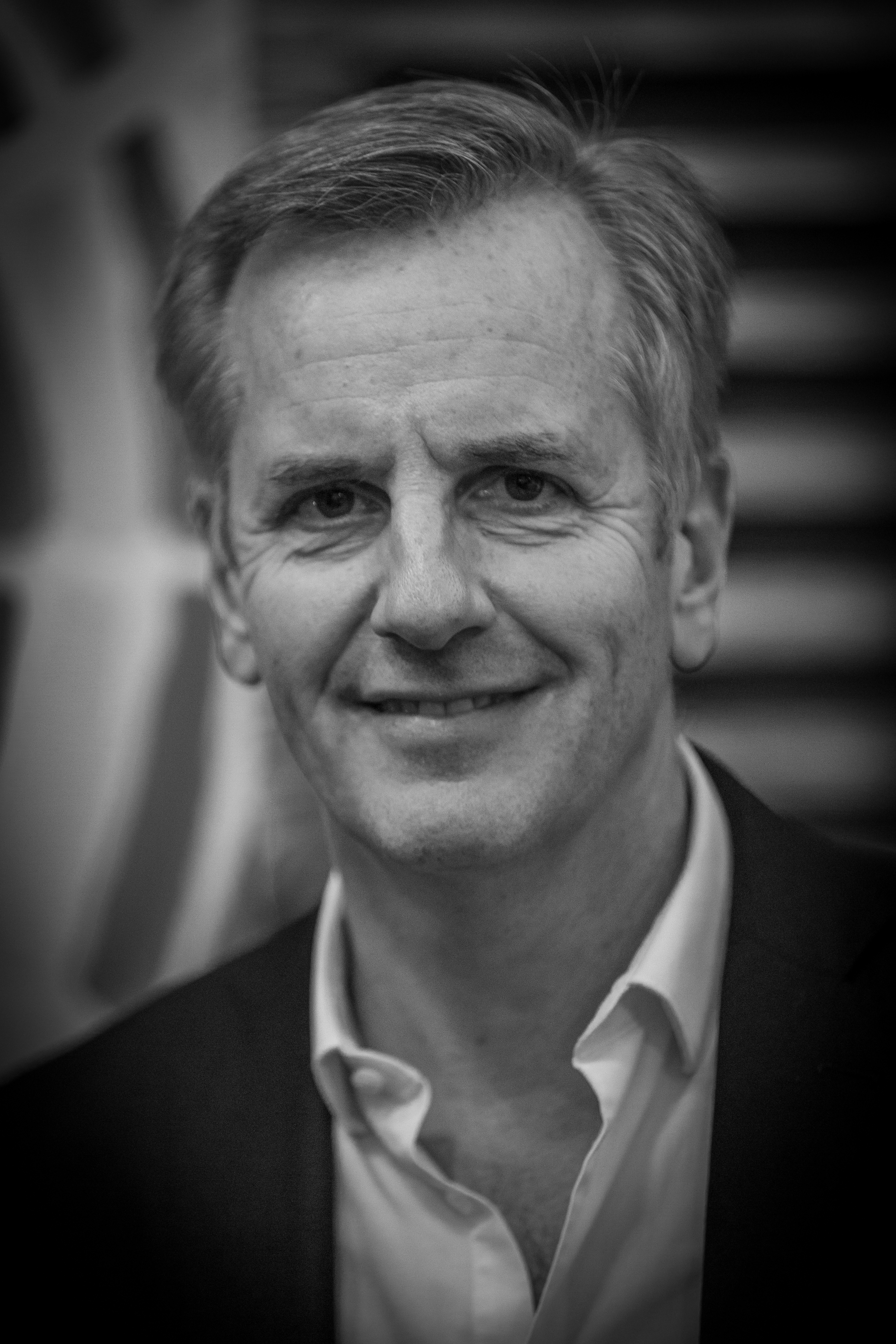
- Bernard de La Villardière in 2015
- Born: Bernard Berger de La Villardière; 25 March 1958 (age 68); Boulogne-Billancourt, Hauts-de-Seine, Île-de-France, France
- Occupations: Journalist, television presenter, radio presenter
- Years active: 1983–present
- Notable credit(s): Zone Interdite; Enquête exclusive
- Television: M6 (1998–present)

Bernard Berger de La Villardière (French pronunciation: [bɛʁnaʁ bɛʁʒe də la vilaʁdjɛʁ]; born 25 March 1958) is a French journalist, radio and television presenter.

== Early life and education ==
Bernard de La Villardière was born in Boulogne-Billancourt in the department of Hauts-de-Seine. He is from a middle class but non-noble family and has three brothers : Jean, François (born in 1963 who founded Business Interactif) and Philippe. He graduated in political science at the Paris West University Nanterre La Défense and in public law. He also graduated in journalism at the CELSA Paris.

== Radio career ==
Bernard de La Villardière began his career as a reporter on FR3 Puy-de-Dôme in 1983 before joining a local radio in the department of Vendée. In 1987, he participates at the creation of France Info before joining RTL to host the morning news on weekend. In the meantime, during seven years, he divides his time between radio and reporting (Romanian Revolution of 1989, Gulf War, Infected blood scandal)

In 1994, he participates at the creation of the French news channel LCI where he presents the news and the Journal du monde. In 1998, he joins the redaction service of Europe 1 as a chief editor and presenter in the morning.

== Television career ==
In September 1998, Bernard de La Villardière joined the channel M6 to host Zone Interdite, the television program about society broadcast on Sunday created by Patrick de Carolis. From 2001 to 2005, he presents during the same period Ça me révolte on the same channel.

Since 2005, he presents on the same channel Enquête exclusive on Sunday during the second part of the evening, a program about political, economic, social and cultural issues. He did in May 2007 an enquiry about the War in Darfur going over there with journalist Mélissa Theuriau, who succeeded him at Zone Interdite. The program was then broadcast in July 2007 on M6 at Zone Interdite.

== Personal life ==
Bernard de La Villardière has three brothers: Jean, François (born in 1963 and founder of Business Interactif ) and Philippe (born in 1969).

Bernard de La Villardière is married and has four children, a daughter Caroline born in 1987, and three sons, Marc born in 1988, Rémi born in 1992, and Nicolas born in 1993.

== Bibliography ==
- L'Anti-drogue; Toxicos, médecins, magistrats, policiers témoignent, Éditions du Seuil, 1994
