= Christophe Jakubyszyn =

French journalist (born 1967)

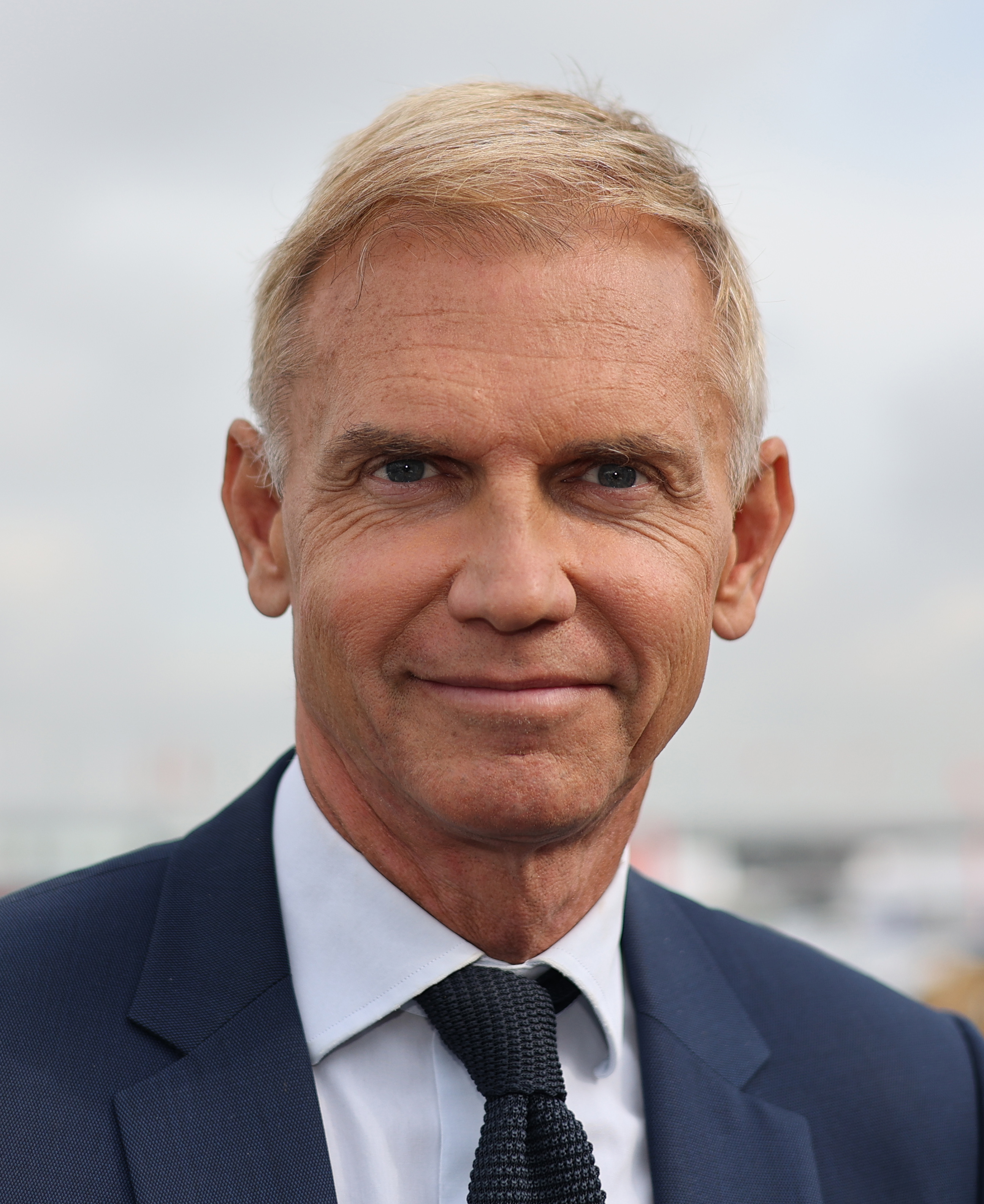
- Born: 8 July 1967 (age 59); Paris, France
- Education: Sciences Po
- Occupation: Journalist
- Employer: Les Echos

Christophe Jakubyszyn (born 8 July 1967) is a French journalist. He is the editorialist for the 1 p.m. and 8 p.m. of TF1 and political columnist for the LCI morning show, he joined the NextRadioTV group in September 2019 to head the Good Morning Business program on the BFM Business channel and RMC Story.

== Early life ==
Jakubyszyn was born in Paris and graduated from Sciences Po.

== Career ==
In September 2010, the management of the station entrusted him with the presentation of a new meeting at midday, the Grand Show de l'Info, from 1 p.m. to 2 pm, which would later become Carrément Brunet presented by the polemicist Éric Brunet.

In October 2012, he was sued by Valérie Trierweiler following the revelations of his relationship with Patrick Devedjian in his biography, La Frondeuse.

He chaired the televised debate for the 2017 French presidential election along with Nathalie Saint-Cricq.

In July 2019, his departure was announced for BFM Business (NextRadioTV group), a channel he found to take over the management of the morning show, replacing Stéphane Soumier.
