= Jean Mistler =

French politician (1897–1988)

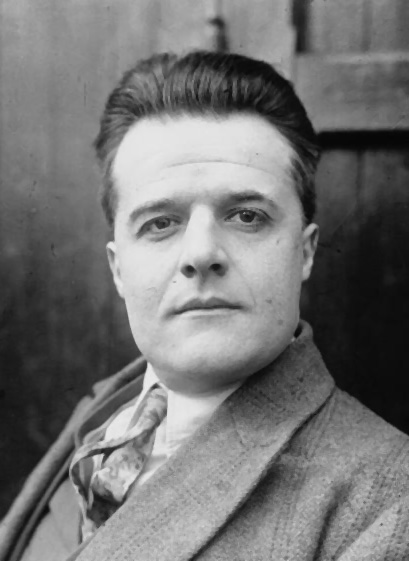
Jean Mistler

Jean Mistler (1 September 1897 – 11 November 1988) was a French writer, diplomat and politician born in Sorèze, Tarn. In 1966 he was elected to the Académie française.

Mistler, whose father's family had left Alsace in 1871, did his schooling in Sorèze, before preparing for the entrance examination of the Ecole Nationale Supérieure at the Lycée Henri IV, where he read philosophy under Alain. Mistler was drafted into the artillery in 1915 and emerged from World War I a staunch pacifist. He was accepted at the École normale in 1919 and came in first in the national Aggrégation exam in German the following year.

Instead of becoming a teacher in France, Mistler applied for a position abroad through the Ministry for Foreign Affairs. He was sent to the French legation in Hungary, becoming a cultural attaché, and teaching at the university of Budapest. In 1925 he was accepted into the Quai d'Orsay (Service des Oeuvres), where he succeeded Paul Morand.

He started a political career in 1928 when he was elected deputé of Aude under the Radical-Socialist label. He received the appointment of under-secretary in charge of the Arts and served as a minister several times, starting in 1932. In 1934, he joined the government of Albert Sarraut, as Minister overseeing the postal service and telecommunications. A music lover, he founded the Orchestre national de la Radiodiffusion française (the ancestor of today's Orchestre National de France). From 1936, he chaired the Foreign Affairs Commission.

In parallel with his political activities, Mistler had begun a career as a writer, with the publication of Châteaux en Bavière (1925) and Ethelka (1929).

On 10 July 1940, in his role as the chair of the voting commission, Mistler introduced before the Parliament the bill that granted the cabinet presided by Marshal Philippe Pétain authority to draw up a new constitution, thereby effectively ending the French Third Republic and establishing Vichy France. This led critics to accuse him, after the war, of having been the "sinker of the Republic." On 23 January 1941, Mistler was made a member of the National Council of Vichy France.

After working for the Éditions du Rocher, Mistler became first the general secretary then the president of the Maison du Livre Français (affiliated with the Ministry for Foreign Affairs). Finally, from 1964 to 1969, he became director of the general literature department at Librairie Hachette.

During these years, Mistler also regularly penned literary and musical criticism for L'Aurore.

On 2 June 1966 Mistler was elected to the Académie française, replacing Robert d'Harcourt.

Mistler died on 11 November 1988 in Paris and was buried in the vault of the d'Auriol family, in Sorèze.
