= Laurence Ferrari =

French journalist (born 1966)

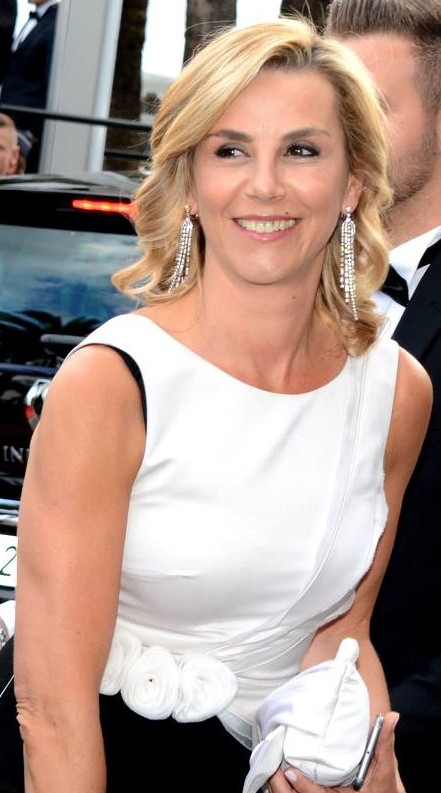
- Laurence Ferrari in 2015
- Born: 5 July 1966 (age 60); Aix-les-Bains, France
- Education: École Française des Attachés de Presse; University of Paris 1 Pantheon-Sorbonne
- Occupation: TV host Punchline on CNews
- Employer(s): CNews; Europe 1
- Spouses: Thomas Hugues (m. 1993; div. 2007) Renaud Capuçon (m. 2009)
- Children: 3

Laurence Ferrari (French: [loʁɑ̃s feʁaʁi] ; born 5 July 1966) is a French journalist, best known as a former anchor of the TF1 weekday evening news Le 20H. She is now one off thé figureheads of Bolloré's far-right media group.

== Early life and education ==
Ferrari was born in Aix-les-Bains, Savoie, the daughter of a former mayor of the city and member of the French National Assembly, Gratien Ferrari, of Italian ancestry from Emilia-Romagna. She attended the École Française des Attachés de Presse (French School for Press Attachés) in Lyon and graduated from the Sorbonne University with a Master of 'Communication Politique and Sociale'. She is the eldest of three sisters and an accomplished pianist.

== Media career ==
She started her career in 1986 as a stringer at the French news agency, AFP, and Le Figaro Magazine. She also worked at the French-language radio station, Europe 1, as a researcher with special responsibility for health policy. She began her television career in 1994 with Michel Drucker in Studio Gabriel on France 2 and thereafter with Jean-Pierre Pernaut in "Combien ça coûte ?" on TF1. In 2001, she co-hosted the TF1 Sunday evening magazine Sept à Huit with her former husband, Thomas Hugues. After her divorce, she moved in 2006 to Canal + to present the channel's weekly political magazine "Dimanche +" where she covered the French presidential election of 2007. In June 2008, she became the new anchor of "Le 20 Heures de TF1" (the flagship TV news programme, which has the highest ratings in Europe), replacing its long-serving anchor Patrick Poivre d'Arvor, and taking over the weekday programme on 25 August 2008.

Ferrari incited controversy in 2010 by wearing a veil to interview President of Iran Mahmoud Ahmadinejad.

Ferrari presented her final 8 pm newscast for TF1 on 31 May 2012, a day after announcing her resignation from the network in order to join Direct 8 for hosting a feminine talk-show for 4 years.

In 2013, she integrated the news network of Canal+ Group, I>Télé, that becomes CNews after the taking in hand of Vincent Bolloré in 2016. Although she didn't take part directly in the strike movement of I>Télé for challenging Vincent Bolloré's influence on the editorial stance of the channel, she felt sympathy for it. Furthermore, according to one of her close friends, she tried a lot of times to leave CNews for another media because of a lack of happiness, but she never succeeded. Consequently, for having more career prospects and awards in the Bolloré's medias, she has been required to spouse progressively the far-right editorial stance of CNews.
