= Mélissa Theuriau =

French journalist and news anchor (born 1978)

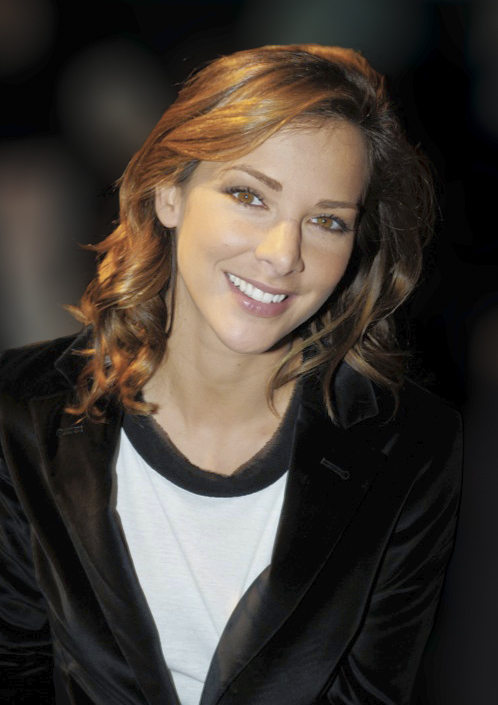
- Theuriau in 2008
- Born: 18 July 1978 (age 48); Échirolles, France
- Occupations: Television presenter and journalist
- Notable credit(s): LCI Matin (LCI); News (LCI, TF1); Voyages (LCI); Zone interdite (M6)
- Spouse: Jamel Debbouze (m. 2008)
- Children: 2

Mélissa Theuriau (French pronunciation: [melisa tœʁjo]; born 18 July 1978) is a French journalist and news anchor for M6. She studied journalism and became a television news presenter. She is the former anchor and co-editor in chief of Zone interdite on French TV.

== Early life ==
Theuriau is from Échirolles near Grenoble, where her mother was an occupational therapist, her father worked in human resources at a hospital. She has a younger brother. Échirolles is a working-class mill town which has elected Communist mayors since 1944. Theuriau said in 2014 "I went to a public school in Grenoble. There was nothing remarkable about my academic record. I had no connections."

Theuriau gained a Diploma in News-Communication from IUT at Pierre Mendès-France University in Grenoble, and later a master's degree in Audiovisual Journalism from the Institute of Communication and Media (ICM) at Échirolles, a school of Grenoble Alpes University.

== Career ==
From 2002, Theuriau was a reporter for Lagardère News at Match TV and in 2003 was appointed as a reporter and anchor for La Chaîne Info, where she became better known to the French general public. She made her breakthrough as a newscaster and travel show host for LCI, the news channel, and for TF1. Her programs were LCI Matin (LCI Morning), the 6:40 news on LCI and TF1 from Monday to Thursday, and the Voyages travel show on Wednesdays at 13:55 on LCI. In May 2006, she surprised the management of TF1 by refusing the offer to be anchorwoman of its weekend evening news, as a summer replacement for sitting anchorwoman Claire Chazal.

In June 2006, Métropole 6, another French television channel, announced her arrival for September as editor-in-chief and presenter of Zone Interdite ("Forbidden Zone"), a weekly magazine show featuring investigative reporting.

She also presents Un jour, une Photo and Deux, trois jours avec moi on the French TV channel Paris Première, in partnership with Paris Match. Un jour, une photo features stories behind iconic and historic photos. Deux, trois jours avec moi is a weekly travel programme in which an invited guest reveals more about him or herself during a trip.

In September 2006, Theuriau was appointed as co-editor in chief and anchor of the influential TV magazine Zone interdite ("Forbidden Zone") on M6. She was to stay there for six years, until August 29, 2012, the date of her last show, which she said she would present barefoot.

== Charity ==
In March 2007, she launched, with five other journalists (Claire Chazal, Marie Drucker, Laurence Ferrari, Béatrice Schönberg, and Tina Kieffer), the organization “La Rose”, which works with UNICEF to help educate girls.

== In popular culture ==
In 2006, the Daily Express voted her the world's most beautiful news reporter. She was similarly voted "TV's sexiest news anchor" by readers of the US edition of Maxim. In May 2007, she was voted most beautiful woman in the world in the French edition of FHM. Paris Match has referred to her as la bombe cathodique ("the television bombshell").

In 2006, Voici, a French tabloid, published pictures showing her topless at a beach. Her lawyers are reportedly attempting to purge these images from the Internet.

In 2010, scam websites co-opted a photograph of her to promote health treatments, the ubiquitous "1 weird old tip" belly fat diets, and penny auctions, unauthorized usage of which Theuriau was initially unaware.

== Personal life ==
On 29 March 2008, she was engaged to French-Moroccan comedian and actor Jamel Debbouze; the two were married on 7 May 2008. They had a son on 3 December 2008 named Léon and a daughter named Lila in 2011.

On August 2012, Theuriau and Debbouze ranked in the top ten of France’s most popular couples in a Harris Interactive poll for Gala magazine.
