= Claire Chazal =

French journalist and television presenter (born 1956)

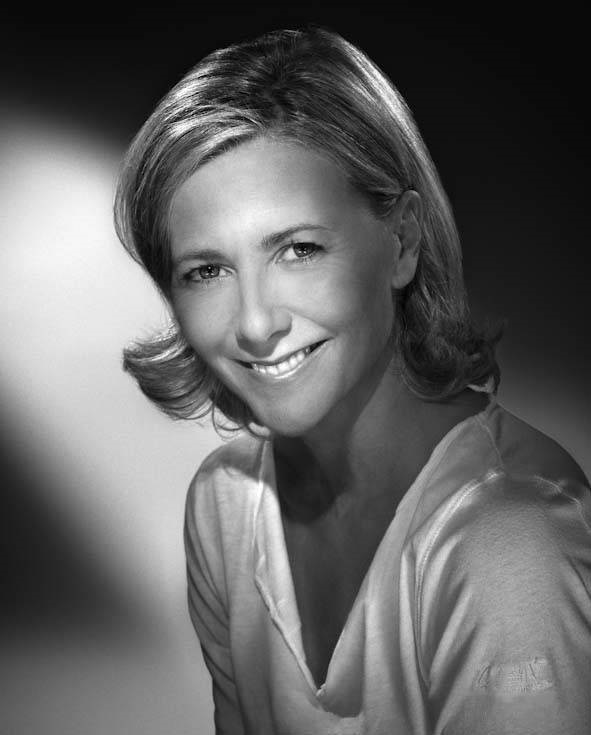
- Chazal in 2009
- Born: 1 December 1956 (age 69); Thiers, France
- Education: HEC Paris
- Occupation: Television journalist
- Employer: TF1

Claire Chazal (pronounced [klɛːʁ ʃazal]; born 1 December 1956) is a French journalist, romance writer, and former director of news at a national television station, France 2.

She had been the weekend news anchor at TF1 beginning in 1991 and gave her final broadcast at the station on 13 September 2015; Anne-Claire Coudray, who had often substituted for her when she was absent, was announced as her replacement. Between 2010 and 2015, she had also been the host of Reportage at 1:30 pm, after the news.

She used to host Je/nous de Claire, a talk show on the gay television channel Pink TV that she helped start in 2004. The title of this show puns on Le Genou de Claire, a French film known in English as Claire's Knee.

Chazal obtained an HEC School of Management diploma.

== Personal life ==
On 29 April 1995, Chazal gave birth to her son, François, born of a relationship she had with Patrick Poivre d'Arvor, who recognised his paternity in 2005 in his book Confessions.

Preceded by Ladislas de Hoyos	Hosts 20 heures and 13 heures during the weekend on TF1; 1991–2015	Succeeded by Anne-Claire Coudray
