= Patrick Simpson-Jones =

French television presenter

- Born: September 23, 1950 (age 74); Paris, France
- Occupation(s): Television presenter, singer, business executive

Patrick C. Simpson-Jones (born September 23, 1950 in Paris, France) is a French business executive, television presenter, and singer.

== Childhood and youth ==
Born to a British father and a Corsican mother, he spent his youth in the United Kingdom where he attended the same school as King Charles III of the United Kingdom.

After his studies in England, he spent a year in Germany, then a year in Spain, learning the German and Spanish languages.

He did his military service with the paratroopers, then worked for two years in Hamburg in public relations. He then became a club rep at Club Med, Tahiti, Mauritius and in Mexico.

An excellent tennis and golf player, he was classified in second series and 9 handicap.

== TV career ==
Quadrilingual, he started working in print media in 1975, specialising in sports journalism and foreign policy.

He worked for six months on television in Melbourne, Australia, when in September 1978 Jacqueline Joubert asked him to join the presenter team of the Dorothée strand in the children's show Récré A2. In 1979, he joined the sports team of Robert Chapatte of Antenne 2 News, then the foreign affairs team of François-Henri de Virieu.

In 1981 he became the first male announcer on French television on Antenne 2, a position he held for six years. He became the official "joker" of William Leymergie in the show Télématin which he presented on numerous occasions between 1985 and 1987. He also hosted the famous game Numbers and letters replacing Patrice Laffont and regularly hosts sections in Télématin. He also became Jacques Martin's official replacement presenter for the shows Incredible but true! and L'École des fans as part of the Sunday show Dimanche Martin.

Between 1984 and 1987, he also hosted the Horizon program on the army and military service, broadcast on Saturday afternoons on FR3. In September 1987, he left the public broadcaster France Télévisions for the newly privatised TF1 and rejoined his friend Dorothée on the Club Dorothée team.

In the United Kingdom, he co-hosted BBC French language series À Vous la France, shown in the mid-late 1980s.

He notably tried his hand at singing as part of the youth programs that he hosted (see discography).

He left the Club Dorothée at the end of 1990 but continued to appear from time to time in shows until the beginning of January 1991. He joined La Cinq from April to May 1991 to present the game show The Line of Chance with Amanda McLane. Following the change in the game schedule, he was replaced by Jacques Perrotte. He returned to TF1 in September 1991 to present the show Télé showcase.

He did not return to the Club Dorothée until the end of October 1992 but finally left the show on 5 June 1996. He did not participate in the last show of the series on 29 August 1997.

== Retirement ==
He lives in Florida, the United States. He is founder and president of the company Swing-Beep LLC, specializing in golf teaching.

== The launch of IDF1 channel ==
Present in France for a few weeks, he participated alongside Dorothée, Ariane, and Jacky in the launch of the Ile-de-France TNT channel IDF1. He presents the opening evening of the channel, and in April and May presented the show Dorothée! Choose your presenters alongside former colleagues from Club Dorothée. He then returned to the United States.

His recent appearances are quite rare, the last one was following the death of Ariane Carletti on 3 September 2019, to whom he paid tribute five days later.

== Discography ==
- San Ku Kaï (Cover of the credits of the eponymous series)

Under the AB Disques label:

- Good evening ma'am / You're going away, 1983
- Kind words / One day, I let you go, 1983
- 2010 narrated by Patrick Simpson-Jones, 1984
- The Ballad of Davy Crockett / The Trapper's Walk, 1986
- She's terrible, 1987
- Spielvan (credits of the eponymous series), 1988
- Marotte et Charlie, 1990 (duet with Jacky)
- Little music for her / One day will come, 1990
- The legend of Saint Nicholas, 1995

== TV shows ==
- Récré A2, Antenne 2, 1978–1982
- The School of Fans, Antenne 2, 1983
- Incredible but true!, Antenne 2, 1983
- Télématin, Antenne 2, 1985–1987 (regular replacements + chronicles)
- Numbers and letters, Antenne 2, 1984–1987 (regular replacements)
- Club Dorothée, TF1, 1987–1991 then 1992–1996
- The Line of Chance, La Cinq, 1991–1992
- Télévitrine, TF1, 1992
- Choose your presenters, IDF1, 2008

== TV series ==
- The Adventures of Dorothée: A Friend, (1987), TF1
- No pity for croissants, (1987–1991), TF1
- Marotte and Charlie, (1987–1991), TF1
- Marotte and Charlie (the sitcom), (1990), TF1

=== TV films ===
- 1991: The Christmas Present
- 1993 : Family laughing

== See also ==
- François Corbier
- Jacky (tv presenter)
