= Récré A2 =

- Network: Antenne 2
- Launched: July 3, 1978
- Closed: June 29, 1988
- Country of origin: France
- Format: Defunct children's block
- Running time: 60 minutes (weekday); 120 minutes (Wednesday)
- Original language: French

Récré A2 was a French children's TV programme broadcast in the 1970s and 1980s, on Antenne 2 (now France 2).

It was produced by Jacqueline Joubert and first aired on July 3, 1978, lasting until June 29, 1988.

Most of the team moved to Club Dorothée after TF1 was privatised in 1987; its final season lacked the longtime team.

== Presenters and staff ==
- Ariane
- Cabu
- Corbier
- Dorothée
- Jacky
- William Leymergie

== Programs ==
- Les Aventures électriques de Zeltron (1979 to 1982)
- Fabeltjeskrant
- Wattoo Wattoo Super Bird
- Yakari (1983 TV series)
- Pimpa
- Mimi Cracra (1986 TV series)
- Ulysse 31
- Maya the Honey Bee
- Les Quaz'e'amis
- Téléchat
- Judo Boy
- Les Paladins De France
- Télétactica
- Space Cobra
- Grendizer
- Candy Candy
- Space Pirate Captain Harlock
- The Rose of Versailles
- The Smurfs (1981 TV series)
- He-Man and the Masters of the Universe
- Spartakus and the Sun Beneath the Sea
- Chapi Chapo
- Arcadia of My Youth: Endless Orbit SSX
- Seabert
- Boule and Bill (1975)
- Casper the Friendly Ghost
- Thundercats
- Sherlock Hound
- Star Wars: Ewoks
- Mio Mao
- She-Ra: Princess of Power
- Groovie Goolies
- The Adventures of Tom Sawyer (1980 TV series)
- The Puppy's Further Adventures
- Mamemo
- George of the Jungle
- Pac-Man (TV series)
- Les Devinettes d'Epinal
- Acrobunch
- The Mysterious Cities of Gold
- Clémentine
- The Transformers (TV series)
- 3-2-1 Contact
- The Little Rascals
- Barriers (TV series)
- Emily (TV series)
- Récré à ľopéra
- Dorotheé et la voiture rouge
- Heidi (1978 TV series)
- Dorotheé et le trésor des Caraïbes
- The Adventures of the Galaxy Rangers
- Treasure Island (1978 TV series)
- Jana of the Jungle
- Johan and Peewit
- Kum-Kum
- Around the World with Willy Fog
- Harold Lloyd's World of Comedy
- Mr. Merlin
- Méthanie
- Papivole
- The Mole (Krtek)
- Quick and Flupke
- Reksio
- The Secret of the Selenites
- Winsome Witch
- Dungeons & Dragons
- Tarzan, Lord of the Jungle
- Tchaou and Grodo
- The Fantastic Journey of Ty and Uan
- Dick Turpin
- Professor Popper's Problem
- Silas (TV series)
- Spectreman
- Message from Space: Galactic Wars
- Space Sheriff Gavan
- Die rote Zora und ihre Bande (TV series)

== See also ==
- Les Musclés, a French band
