= Jacky (tv presenter) =

French television presenter

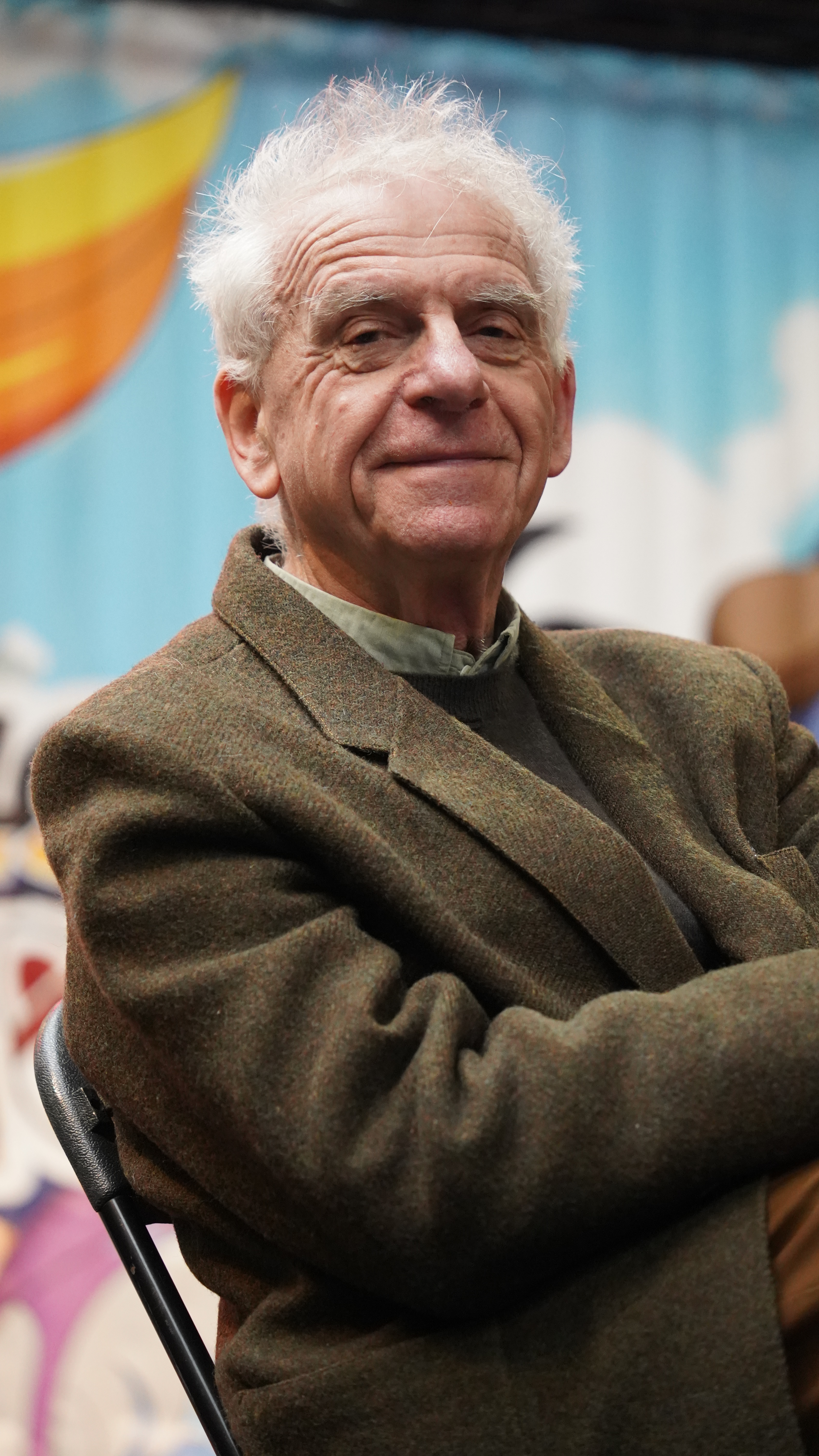
- Jacky in 2026
- Born: Jacques Jakubowicz; 30 April 1948 (age 77); Paris, France
- Occupations: Television presenter, television producer, comedian, singer
- Years active: 1973–present
- Television: Club Dorothée (TF1); Jacky Show (TF1)

Jacques Jakubowicz, better known as Jacky (born 30 April 1948) is a French television presenter. He is well known for his role as a precursor of music television programs in the 1980s with Les Enfants du Rock and Platine 45 on Antenne 2 and for participating at the program Club Dorothée on TF1.

== Life and career ==
=== Early career ===
Jacky graduated from the École de Journalisme of Paris and began his career in 1973 at Phonogram Records as a press secretary for several French and international artists. These include Serge Gainsbourg (for 8 years), Alain Bashung, Cat Stevens, Genesis, Peter Gabriel, Roxy Music and Bob Marley, with whom he was the press secretary for 5 years. During that time, he became a journalist for the magazine Rock & Folk.

He made his debut on television in 1978 in the music program Chorus where he had a role as a mute presenter with Antoine de Caunes. In 1979, he joined the team for children's program of that time Récré A2, after being discovered by Jacqueline Joubert who was the director of the children's unit on Antenne 2 in 1980s. She hired him to replace Dorothée, stuck during the filming of Love on the Run. He became very the main presenter in the program for seven years and his collaboration with the presenter became very popular.

After the end of Chorus, he presented the music program Les Enfants du Rock with Antoine de Caunes and Philippe Manœuvre. In 1982, Pierre Lescure, director of the variety unit of Antenne 2, gave the opportunity to Jacky to present his first program alone title Platine 45. Broadcast from 1982 to 1986 every day of the week, this program was the first one in France to show music videos, and permitted to Jacky to receive several artists and film celebrities such as Catherine Deneuve, Coluche, Mylène Farmer, Alain Bashung, Iggy Pop, Elton John, France Gall, Serge Gainsbourg, Nina Hagen, Étienne Daho, Sophie Marceau, Gérard Lanvin, Isabelle Adjani, Patrick Bruel, Jane Birkin, Renaud, Les Rita Mitsouko, Taxi Girl, The Clash, Alain Souchon, Jacno, Lio, Daniel Balavoine, etc. He also presented during the same period a radio program on Europe 1 from Monday to Friday in 1984–85 and on Skyrock in 1985–86.

In 1985, he recorded a song with Lio titled "Tétéoù" that was a success. They later recorded another song together titled "Cache-cache dans l'espace". He then released another song titled "Le parleur des haut-parleurs" in 1986 that was also a success.

=== Club Dorothée ===
After the end of the program Platine 45, Jacky left Récré A2 and joined TF1 to present children's program Vitamine, succeeding to Karen Cheryl. During that time, he recorded the single "Tout augmente sauf l'amour" that was a success sold at 75,000 copies. He went on tour with Dorothée for her concerts at the Zénith de Paris and in France from December 1986 to May 1987 during the Zénith 86 and performed with her the song "Toi et moi, vous et nous" released in early 1987.

In September 1987, he became with Dorothée one of the five presenters of Club Dorothée for 10 years (1987–97), obtaining an important popularity. On 26 December 1987 he became, along with Carlos and Lio, one of the main characters of the musical comedy Dorothée Show, broadcast on prime time on TF1, watched by over 6 million viewers, a record at that period. He also participated at five other shows of Dorothée until 1994, but also at the charity program Le Noël de l'amitié.

From 1987 to 1995, he presented again music programs including the famous Jacky Show, produced by AB Productions and in which he received singers and bands of the topical moment. The program was a success during 8 years. He also hosted Club Mini, a morning children's program with Ariane Carletti for 6 years.

Jacky also played with the other presenters of Club Dorothée in the sitcom Pas de pitié pour les croissants (1987–91). During those years, he pursued his singing career recording a few singles at AB Disques, especially "Rêverie d'un promeneur solitaire au pied du Fuji-Yama". The single cover was designed by the famous graphic artists Pierre et Gilles. He also presented several concerts titled Jacky Show Maxi Music at the Zénith de Paris, Bercy, the Halle de la Villette and on tour in France.

== Television programs ==
- 1978–81 : Chorus, with Antoine de Caunes, Antenne 2
- 1980–86 : Récré A2, with Dorothée, Antenne 2
- 1982–86 : Les Enfants du rock, with Antoine de Caunes, Antenne 2
- 1982–86 : Platine 45 and Super Platine, Antenne 2
- 1986–87 : Vitamine, TF1
- 1987–97 : Club Dorothée, with Dorothée, TF1
- 1987–95 : Jacky Show, TF1
- 1991–96 : Club Mini, with Ariane Carletti, TF1
- 1992–96 : Le Noël de l'amitié, TF1
- 1998 : 80's Jacky Show, MCM
- 1998–2006 : Rabbi Jacky Show, TFJ
- 2006–08 : Saturday Jacky Show, TFJ
- 2006–07 : Les années Club Do, AB1
- 2007 : Les années Sitcom, NT1
- 2007 : Le Grand Sketch, NT1
- 2008 : Choisissez vos animateurs, with Dorothée, IDF1
- 2008 : Jack'île de France, IDF1
- 2008–09 : Pas de pitié pour le net, with Dorothée, IDF1
- 2008–11 : Le Noël de l'amitié, IDF1
- Since 2008 : JJDA : Jacky Journal d'Aujourd'hui, IDF1
- 2009–12 : Vous avez du talent, IDF1
- 2011 : Gainsbourg, 20 ans déjà !, AB1 and Club RTL

== Bibliography ==
- 1992 : Mes recettes de cuisine
- 1994 : Ma cuisine au coca-cola
- 2007 : Docteur Jacky et Mister Rock, Jacky (ISBN 2080686313)
