= La Cinq =

Former French television channel (1986–1992)

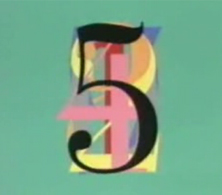
- Final logo used from 1991 to 1992
- Country: France

Programming
- Language: French
- Picture format: 576i SDTV

Ownership
- Owner: Chargeurs réunis and Fininvest (1985–1987); Robert Hersant and Fininvest (1987–1990); Matra Hachette and Fininvest (1990–1992)

History
- Launched: 20 February 1986; 40 years ago
- Closed: 12 April 1992; 34 years ago
- Replaced by: Arte; France 5 (known as "La Cinquième" before 2002) (1994)

La Cinq (French: [la sɛ̃k], lit. 'The Five') was a French free-to-air television channel. Created by politician Jérôme Seydoux and Italian media mogul Silvio Berlusconi, it existed from 1986 to 1992.

The contract for France's fifth terrestrial network, which was supposed to have been in effect for an 18-year term, was granted to Seydoux and Berlusconi in November 1985. It was the first private free-to-air television network in France. Programming began on 20 February 1986 at 8:30 pm; the first program on La Cinq was Voilà la Cinq, which was taped at Canale 5's studios in Milan, Italy.

After the music channel TV6 in 1987, La Cinq became the second French national channel to have its broadcasting authorization withdrawn, following its bankruptcy.

== History ==
Audience share
1986	4.2%
1987	7.3%
1988	10.3%
1989	13.0%
1990	11.7%
1991	10.9%

=== Formation ===
In 1985, a little over a year before the legislative elections, the Socialist Party feared failure and wanted to create a new space outside of the institutional domain of public television, capable of reaching a large audience (unlike the private subscription channel Canal+) and constitute a relay of opinion to its ideas if it was to return to the opposition.

On 16 January 1985 at 8pm, President of France François Mitterrand announced on the main evening news on Antenne 2, the creation of two new free-to-air private television channels, La Cinq and TV6 and also the creation of up to 85 local television stations. He launched the idea of "an additional space of freedom" and asked the government of Laurent Fabius to study the project. The lawyer Jean-Denis Bredin, charged by the Prime Minister with drafting a report on the opening of "the television space to private television", submitted it to him on 20 May. The latter recommended the creation of two private, unencrypted national channels financed by advertising and whose frequencies would be licensed by the State in accordance with article 79 of the law of 29 July 1982 on audiovisual communication. On 31 July, Georges Fillioud, French Secretary of State in charge of Communication Technologies, presented to the Council of Ministers a speech on the development of the audiovisual sector. He announced a bill defining the creation, by the spring of 1986, of two new private television channels with national broadcasting, one general, the other with a musical vocation, as well as local television channels, whose capital would include press groups, production companies and advertising agencies.

A call for applications is launched for which CLT unofficially applied, aiming to establish RTL Télévision on French territory. The Fininvest group of Italian commercial television magnate Silvio Berlusconi sees this as an opportunity to extend its network in Europe, in order to market its catalogue of programs. At the beginning of November 1985, Silvio Berlusconi joined forces with the Chargeurs Réunis group of Jérôme Seydoux and Christophe Riboud to create the company France 5, which presented a commercial television project to obtain a concession on the new fifth terrestrial network. Berlusconi therefore used his political connections at the highest level, including those with the socialist president of the Italian Council, Bettino Craxi, who took it upon himself to warmly recommend him to François Mitterrand.

At the same time, the government engaged in a battle with the opposition in the National Assembly to obtain an amendment to the law on private television allowing the free installation of transmitters by TDF at the top of the Eiffel Tower, without having to obtain authorization from the city of Paris, owner of the monument and whose right-wing mayor is none other than the president of the RPR, Jacques Chirac. The Eiffel Tower amendment was finally adopted by the deputies of the left-wing majority on 15 November 1985.

=== Berlusconi and Seydoux's La Cinq ===
On 20 November 1985, the government granted an 18-year concession to France Cinq, allowing them to operate the fifth national television network. This decision was criticised by the Minister of Culture and some of the President's advisers, who wanted to see cultural programming, and by the High Authority of Audiovisual Communication, which did not approve of the conditions but had no power to change them. At a press conference on 22 November 1985, Seydoux and Berlusconi presented the focus and style of the programs that would be broadcast on the fifth television channel. In response to critics who accused them of wanting to create "Coca-Cola" TV, Berlusconi, who developed La Cinq's programming from his catalogues, replied that the channel would be "neither Coca-Cola TV, nor spaghetti TV, but rather Beaujolais TV, a Saturday champagne". He also promised to feature well-known TV or film stars.

Determined to block this project, 60 senators had the Constitutional Council declare the "Eiffel Tower amendment" (French: amendement Tour Eiffel) unconstitutional on 13 December 1985. This forced the government to draft a new bill, which was accepted by Parliament on 21 December. On 31 December 1985, the France 5 company was incorporated in anonymous form with its registered office in Paris. On 16 January 1986 the RTL Group (at the time the Compagnie Luxembourgeoise de Télédiffusion (CLT)) unsuccessfully attempted to persuade the Council of State to cancel the concession agreement; instead the government gave the RTL Group the right to use one of the two remaining free channels of the future TDF 1 satellite. On 20 January, Silvio Berlusconi presented the programs of his future commercial channel, officially known as La Cinq, to journalists, industrialists and advertisers in order to convince them to buy advertising airtime to finance the channel. The next day, the police were forced to intervene in order to allow TDF technicians to install La Cinq's transmitters at the top of the Eiffel Tower, after the City of Paris refused to do so for security reasons.

By mid-February, the capital of the France 5 company created to manage La Cinq worth 50 million francs is closed, where 40% is owned by Fininvest (Berlusconi) and 60% by SEPC (French shareholders).

==== Launch ====
After three months of hostilities and a month of technical testing, La Cinq was finally able to start broadcasting on Thursday, 20 February 1986 at 20:30 local time, airing an introductory broadcast entitled Voila la Cinq, which had been recorded in the Fininvest Group's Milan studio. Up until midnight, Christian Morin, Roger Zabel, Amanda Lear, Ėlisabeth Tordjman and Alain Gillot-Pétré hosted major French stars (Johnny Hallyday, Serge Gainsbourg, Mireille Mathieu, Charles Aznavour) as well as international stars like Ornella Muti, who had been invited by Silvio Berlusconi to support a show that would be able to compete with TF1 or Antenne 2. For the next few weeks, the programming consisted of game shows and variety shows like Pentathlon, C'est beau la vie, and Cherchez la femme, which had been adapted from successful shows on Silvio Berlusconi's Italian network, Canale 5, and had also been influenced by French magazines like Mode. The programs were repeated every four to five hours and had up to three commercial breaks per show. The first hosts had formerly been presenters on TF1 (Christian Morin), Antenne 2 (Alain Gillot-Pétré, Roger Zabel and Élisabeth Tordjman), or one of Berlusconi's Italian networks (Amanda Lear). A continuity announcer presented the programs.

After the launch, the network was invested into feature film production of native theatrical feature films.

=== Pioneering usage of repeats ===
Voilà La Cinq was broadcast at 8:30pm on 20 February 1986 and repeated at midnight, later the following day three times, at 7:30am, 11:30am and 3:30pm. Like this inauguration evening, the channel's programs are multi-broadcast according to the loop system. Offering four hours of programmes repeated five times per day, allowing the channel to broadcast 20 hours a day. From March 1986, La Cinq offered a few films at night.

=== 24-hour broadcasting ===
On the occasion of the first round of the 1988 presidential election, La Cinq broadcast 24 hours a day from 24 April 1988, during the special presidential election night, toggling between series, music videos and news flashes.

=== American series, the sinews of war ===
Starting in February 1986, American TV series aired during daytime and late night programming. Most of these series came from Fininvest's catalogue and were distributed by production subsidiary Reteitalia. Some were new or unknown to viewers but others were familiar, because they were broadcast on other French networks in the 1960s and 1970s: Diff'rent Strokes, Happy Days, Mission: Impossible, Star Trek, The Dukes of Hazzard and Wonder Woman. Others such as The Twilight Zone were new and had to be dubbed. In 1985, TF1 was interested in the new version of The Twilight Zone even though it had not yet been broadcast by CBS. However, none of the purchasing managers at TF1 seriously consider that a young, still non-existent private channel could enter into competition with them. This is how the first channel missed this acquisition in favour of La Cinq. To celebrate the event, Philip Deguere, the executive producer of the series, wished La Cinq good luck, in a message broadcast during the inaugural evening. Just before the 8:30pm film, the strategic 7:30pm slot was occupied each day of the week by the show À fond la caisse in which a series is broadcast each time aimed at a young audience: Airwolf on Monday, Knight Rider on Tuesday, Riptide on Wednesday, CHiPs on Thursday and Street Hawk on Friday.

=== Films ===
While FR3 was only authorized to broadcast 310 films per year, compared to 170 for TF1 and Antenne 2, La Cinq broadcast 250 films several times a week at 8:30pm in its first year. Among the first big-budget films broadcast in the first week were the French comedy L'Africain (first film, broadcast on Sunday, 23 February 1986, at 8:30pm), Saturday Night Fever (broadcast on Monday 24 February 1986 at 8:30pm) and La Féline (broadcast on Tuesday 25 February 1986 at 8:30pm); the last of which had its director Paul Schrader taking legal action, opposing the advertising cut. Films represented the channel's largest audience, helping attract a 15% share in Île-de-France.

Cinema professionals, citing a risk of a drop in theatre attendance, vigorously criticize the fact that La Cinq's specifications authorize it to broadcast films two years after their theatrical release, compared to three for other channels (except Canal+).

The filmmaker Bertrand Tavernier, then president of the Society of Film Directors, took the lead in a protest movement among directors. In order to protest against the "sausaging of films" (saucissonage des films) by advertising on La Cinq, he returned his medal of Knight of Arts and Letters. He was a signatory of L'appel d'Aubervilliers, along with Bernard Giraudeau, François Chaumette, Pierre Arditi, Gérard Blain, Marcel Bluwal, Maurice Dugowson, Anny Duperey, Jacques Fansten, Philippe Léotard, Stellio Lorenzi, Jean Rochefort, Claude Santelli etc.

=== Broken concessions ===
Following the legislative elections of March 1986, the right returned to power. Jacques Chirac, who had become Prime Minister, asked his Minister of Communication, François Léotard, to implement the government's audiovisual policy: privatization of TF1 (FR3 was initially planned) and cancellation of the concessions of the two new private channels, La Cinq and TV6, too quickly awarded under pressure from the Élysée without a real call for tenders. By Decree No. 86-901 of 30 July 1986, the Chirac government decided to reallocate this channel before the end of its concession.

In order not to leave a black screen, La Cinq was authorized to continue broadcasting but had to immediately stop broadcasting feature films. From Sunday 20 April, a made-for-TV film replaced the planned film and all feature films scheduled subsequently will have their slot reassigned to series or TV movies. To compensate for this lack of feature films, the channel had to buy prestigious mini-series. In April 1986, RTL Télévision regained the rights to the series Dynasty for France and transferred them to FR3, in order to prevent Italian media mogul Silvio Berlusconi from broadcasting the series on La Cinq. In December of the same year, La Cinq was once again authorized to broadcast theatrical feature films: the first would be The Blues Brothers.

Following an appeal by TV6, this decree was cancelled by order of the Council of State on 2 February 1987, because the minister did not respect the legal deadline for the concession of one year. However, the National Commission for Communication and Liberties (CNCL), which replaced the High Authority for Audiovisual Communication since 30 September 1986, established on 15 January 1987, the general and specific obligations of "private national free-to-air terrestrial televisions" by decisions No. 87-1 and 87–2. On 2 February 1987, Decree No. 87-50 terminated the concession contract for the fifth channel which ended on 28 February 1987, at midnight and at the same time opened the call for applications for the reattribution of the network. However, to avoid having a black screen, the CNCL invited La Cinq and TV6 to continue their programs while the two networks were reallocated.

=== Hersant's La Cinq ===
The first candidate in line to respond to the CNCL's call for applications is Robert Hersant's Socpresse group (Le Figaro, France-Soir) which, with the support of the government, is seeking to establish itself in television. He joined forces with the former owners of the channel, Silvio Berlusconi and Jérôme Seydoux, to form on 10 February 1987 the Société d'exploitation de La Cinq, which wished to create a pluralist and informative channel. For its part, Lyonnaise des Eaux via Nicolas de Tavernost, by joining forces with the Canadian channel Télé-Métropole, was preparing a project for a private French channel called Métropole Télévision, and entrusted to the former CEO of Antenne 2, Jean Drucker, responsible for presenting this application to the CNCL.

The only serious competitors during this call for tenders are the Occidentale media TV group led by Jimmy Goldsmith who wishes to form a popular, general and family channel. As for CLT, it was unaware that the network had already been promised to another friend of the Prime Minister, the press magnate Robert Hersant. In the meantime, Télé-Métropole left Lyonnaise des Eaux's project to join La Cinq by purchasing 3.42% of the capital of the new private channel. CLT finally gave up its candidacy for this network after obtaining assurances from the government to recover the sixth channel. Hachette, which is competing for the takeover of TF1 currently being privatized, was not presenting any projects.

On 23 February 1987, the CNCL awarded the public service concession for the fifth national TV network to the operating company of La Cinq for ten years. Robert Hersant then enters the capital of La Cinq as main operator of the channel and appoints Philippe Ramond general manager. The two men bet on information and hired Patrice Duhamel as information director in the spring of 1987, tasking him with setting up an editorial team placed under the authority of Jacques Hébert. This brand new editorial team is located at 241, boulevard Pereire in Paris, in a former Renault garage which has become the channel's headquarters. Around figures already known to viewers, such as Jean-Claude Bourret or Marie-France Cubadda from TF1, a team of young journalists will strive to create every day, from 14 September 1987, five editions of its news service with a resolutely direct and innovative tone.

In April 1987, the rights of 'Dallas' were acquired by La Cinq, Silvio Berlusconi proposed to pay 600,000 francs per episode, instead of 280,000 like TF1 (Berlusconi's figure being more than double).

=== Children's programming ===
La Cinq's children-oriented programming block, Youpi! L'école est finie ("Hooray! School's over!"), began broadcasting on 2 March 1987, and would last until the channel's dissolution. Broadcasting in the morning between 7 and 9 AM and in the evening between 5 and 6 PM, the block was notable for airing French-language dubs of numerous Japanese anime series, including:

- Princess Sarah
- King Arthur
- Esper Mami (as Malicieuse Kiki)
- Nadia: The Secret of Blue Water (as Nadia, le secret de l'eau bleue)
- Hello! Sandybell (as Sandy Jonquille)
- Pastel Yumi, the Magic Idol (as Susy aux fleurs magiques)
- Hikari no Densetsu (as Cynthia ou le rythme de la vie)
- Lady!! (as Gwendoline)
- Story of the Alps: My Annette (as Dans les Alpes avec Annette)
- Creamy Mami, the Magic Angel (as Creamy, merveilleuse Creamy)
- Captain Tsubasa (as Olive et Tom)
- Persia, the Magic Fairy (as Vanessa et la magie des rêves)
- Attacker You! (as Jeanne et Serge)
- Blue Blink (as Magie Bleue)
- Ganbare, Kickers! (as But por Rudy)
- Ai Shite Knight (as Embrasse-moi Lucile)
- Katri, Girl of the Meadows (as Cathy la petite fermière)
- Tales of Little Women (as Les 4 filles du docteur Match)
- The Swiss Family Robinson: Flone of the Mysterious Island (as Flo et les Robinson suisses)
- Ohayō! Spank (as Les aventures de Claire et Tipoune)
- Kimagure Orange Road (as Max et Compagnie)
- Hiatari Ryōkō! (as Une vie nouvelle)
- Touch (as Théo ou la batte de la victoire)
- Tsurikichi Sanpei (as Paul le pêcheur)
- La Seine no Hoshi (as La tulipe noire)
- Queen Millennia (as La reine du fond des temps)
- Wing-Man
- Nobody's Boy: Remi
- Grendizer (as Goldorak)
- Candy Candy
- Georgie!
- Grimm's Fairy Tale Classics (as Raconte-moi une histoire)
- Magical Princess Minky Momo (as Gigi)
- Peter Pan: The Animated Series
- Lucy-May of the Southern Rainbow (as Karine, L'Aventure Du Nouveau Monde)
- Fushigi no Kuni no Alice (as Alice au pays des merveilles)

In addition to the Japanese-based animated programmes listed above, the channel also aired some animated programs from other sources, including Robotech, Clémentine, Snorks, Manu, Diplodos, Bucky O'Hare and the Toad Wars, and The Smurfs. Many of the Youpi! series were also aired in Italy as they had been licensed by Fininvest. The block helped popularize Japanese animation in France — it was sufficiently prominent in 1989 to be a target of criticism by then-representative Ségolène Royal. Many of the anime series that aired on La Cinq (notably Captain Tsubasa and Ai Shite Knight) would later air on TF1 as a part of the Club Dorothée block.

=== Presenters and hosts ===
In its desire to assert itself as a major generalist channel, the new Cinq also poached three successful hosts of TF1, which was in the process of privatisation (Patrick Sébastien, Patrick Sabatier and Stéphane Collaro), by offering them more than 3 million francs per show. She also enlisted the services of Philippe Bouvard (host of a very popular show on RTL, Les Grosses Têtes, long-time collaborator of the Hersant group) and Michel Robbe (host of La Roue de la fortune on TF1). In order to capture a young and urban audience, La Cinq opens its doors to new faces: Childéric Muller, coming from the closed TV6, is responsible for "Pop" entertainment and Thierry Ardisson, who launches his offbeat interviews in Bain de Minuit (Midnight Bath).

At the start of the 1987-88 television season, France was covered with posters where the new hosts, in photos, invited the public to come to the channel, under the slogan "Cinq you La Cinq!" (pun with "Thank You La Cinq!").

However, during this period, the channel could only be received in a restricted part of the territory, especially in the cities, while the entertainment programs offered correspond to what is known as "deep France". Furthermore, the new channels broadcast on a more modern variant of SÉCAM compatible with teletext, the image appearing in black and white on somewhat old sets, which required a wider antenna to be received.

Hosts-producers bought at a high price (a budget of 3 million francs per show, for Collaro, around 4 million francs for Sébastien) was not enough to boost the audience and attract advertisers. In tandem with these failures, the audience drops. Going from 8.4% in September 1987 to 6.8% in November 1987, while the cost of the schedule increased from 20 million francs per month to 150 million francs.

As consequence, La Cinq was forced to review its schedule and reduce its expenses (150 million francs per month) by a third.

=== News and current affairs programming ===
The appearance of the satellite and the music for the opening of the news, Thus Spoke Zarathustra, were chosen by Robert Hersant himself. As for the inlays illustrating the reporting subjects and the decor on a control room background, blue or black, the permanent news bulletin (idea imported from Japan), these were due to Christian Guy, former journalist, editor-in-chief and producer of the newspaper La Cinq.

Each television news program calls for public voting via "televoting". Jean-Claude Bourret created the first interactive television show with Duel sur la Cinq: viewers vote every day (by telephone and Minitel) and choose the debater who convinced them the most. As for Guillaume Durand, he asks the "minitel question". Every evening, viewers are invited to vote "yes" or "no" on a current issue, a clever method to accustom viewers to using their Minitel, then participate in games and earn money for the channel.

In October 1987, Marie-France Cubbada blamed the low audience at 8pm on TDF technicians who were slowing down the expansion of the fifth network. Other journalists considered that Boulevard Bouvard, broadcast ahead of prime-time, was not a good locomotive for the main news.

=== French fiction ===
In order to respect its obligations regarding French production quotas, beginning in 1988, La Cinq imports from Québec the téléroman concept. In order to prepare viewers, the channel started broadcasting Quebec series in advance throughout the preceding summer: L'Or du temps, Marisol, Belle Rive, Le Clan Beaulieu etc.

- Voisin, voisine: by filming 18 60-minute episodes per week (more than 3 episodes per day), La Cinq aimed to fill, for the cheapest possible price, the quotas for French-speaking productions broadcast on its channel (requirement of 400 hours/year). Broadcast from 19 September 1988, the series depicts the lives of the inhabitants of a building. This series, first broadcast in the morning in relative discretion, was then "discovered" by an insomniac audience during nightly rebroadcasts. The poverty of the dialogues resulting from improvisations inspired Tonino Benacquista to write his novel Saga.

Tendresse et Passion: Another series, also created to meet the above legal requirements. Broadcast from 6 March 1989, this series was set in the hospital environment, with Pascale Roberts in the leading role. It was parodied by Les Inconnus in their sketch Maitresses et patients broadcast on 22 March 1991 in La Télé des Inconnus.

From 1991, episodes of the two series were used as late night filler programming, after Cas de divorce, the late news (Journal de la Nuit) and Le Club du Télé-Achat.

=== Audience results ===
La Cinq's news programs have had some success, such as Jean-Claude Bourret's edition from 12:30pm, which gives viewers a voice via a survey by Minitel at the end of the news, or the fact that it put debates back in the spotlight in his Duel sur la Cinq before the news, or Guillaume Durand's main bulletin at 8pm, crowned with a 7 d'or for "Best TV news presenter" in 1989, Patrick de Carolis's major reporting show Reporters, or Childéric, Childéric Muller's music show. Conversely, the channel's other shows, including those presented by Patrick Sabatier, Stéphane Collaro or Patrick Sébastien, do not achieve the expected audience and are stagnating around 5%. The star presenters ended up returning to TF1 in 1988.

Following its good audiences during the coverage of the Romanian revolution of 1989 and the fall of the Berlin Wall, La Cinq launched Le Turbo sur l'info from 5 February 1990. The Reporters magazine is broadcast every day at 7pm and the main news is brought forward to 7:45pm. La Cinq innovateed and experienced two years focused on information, sport (Paris-Dakar) and films from the Berlusconi catalog, including numerous low-budget B series classified as TV films ("La Cinq, every evening a film!") and American series.

=== Controversies, fines and notifications ===
- Definition of a film: the CNCL wanted to bring La Cinq to justice, after it broadcast the feature film Commando Leopard on a Saturday evening - 30 April 1988. As this film has never been released on French screens, the channel considers that it cannot be assimilated to the definition of a film. La Cinq attacked the CNCL before the Council of State.
- Number of films per week: after forcing La Cinq to stop broadcasting four theatrical films per week, the CNCL refused one of the channel's main slogans, "La Cinq, every evening a film", because the films broadcast on Wednesday, Friday and Saturday are, due to the legislation, made-for-TV films. It was changed and became "Cinema or television, La Cinq, every evening, a film". On 10 February 1989, the Council of State imposed a fine of 12.17 million francs on the channel for non-compliance with the broadcasting quotas for French and community audiovisual works in 1988.
- Excessive advertising length: the CNCL referred the matter to the Council of State because La Cinq has exceeded the maximum limit of interruption in a film and the authorized duration of advertisements. Consequently, any further excess were subject to a financial penalty of 6,000 francs per second.
- Erotic films: on 21 July 1988, the Council of State ordered La Cinq to deprogram the erotic film Joy and Joan, initially scheduled for 8:30pm, to broadcast it at 10:30pm · following protests from Catherine Tasca and Jack Lang, which did not prevent the channel from broadcasting Lady Chatterley's Lover, another erotic film, at 8:30pm on 6 October 1988, which allowed the channel to achieve a 13% audience share, the best score in its entire history.
- Colorized film: Historically, the first time that a French court confirmed the moral rights of an American filmmaker dates back to 1959, when Charlie Chaplin opposed a soundtrack and cards added without his authorization to his silent film The Kid. In 1986, Turner Entertainment acquired the rights to The Asphalt Jungle, following the purchase of the Metro-Goldwyn-Mayer studio and its catalog. Turner Entertainment decided to colorize the film and entered into an agreement with La Cinq to distribute this colorized version, a first in France. The channel planned to air it in Double vision, with the broadcast of the colorized version as well as a debate on the colorization of films followed by the original in black and white with subtitles. The heirs of John Huston opposed this, filing a lawsuit against the exploitation of this version, but were rejected in the United States. On 12 June 1988, the Society of French Directors protested against the broadcast of the film, scheduled for 26 June 1988. On 23 November 1988, The Asphalt Jungle was banned from broadcast in France. But, on 6 July 1989, La Cinq won the appeal and broadcast the colorized version, with the slogan "When the city sleeps... and dreams in color" on 6 August 1989 (the day after the anniversary of Marilyn Monroe's death). Finally, on 28 May 1991, the Court of Cassation overturned and annulled the judgment rendered on 6 July 1989, and ruled in favour of the heirs of the filmmaker who obtained 600,000 francs in damages for violating the integrity of the film, arguing that this transformation of the work cannot be done, in the name of moral rights, without the agreement of the artist or his beneficiaries. · Anjelica Huston, the filmmaker's daughter, successfully used French copyright law to establish case law in 1991 that prevents the distribution or broadcast in France of any colorized version of a film against the wishes of the original creator or his heirs.
- On 4 October 1989, the Superior Audiovisual Council deplored the broadcast of a report on the "Black Prince of the ring road" in the program Reporters on 29 and 30 September 1989.
- Exceeding the broadcast of films: on 24 November 1989, the channel was put on notice by the CSA, La Cinq having exceeded the limit of 104 broadcasts of cinematographic works between 8:30pm and 10:30pm for the year 1989. No longer able to broadcast films until 31 December 1989, it rebroadcast the mini-series V and V, the Final Battle from 25 November 1989, in prime time.
- Airing of violent programs: on 21 December 1989, the CSA fined La Cinq 5 million francs for having broadcast an episode of The Hitchhiker on 27 June 1989 at 4:30pm and the television film Les Voix de la nuit, on 10 July 1989, at 8:30pm, the two programs being too violent to be broadcast before 10:30pm. The Council of State annuls the conviction for the Videomania episode, but confirmed it for Les Voix de la nuit, reducing the fine to 3 million francs. The Hersant group "put away" its stock of American programs acquired by the Italians, deemed "too hard" (based on sex and violence) and took charge of directly purchasing more politically correct TV films. As a consequence, the public was less present.
- Opening of two judicial investigations after two investigations by La Cinq: Le Canard chainé implicates journalists from the magazine Reporters, having filmed scenes of beatings carried out by the extremist group Tagar broadcast on 18 May 1990, as well as the attack on Karim Diallo in Paris by the Revolutionary Nationalist Youth on 22 April 1990, without having come to the aid of the victims.

=== From the European Consortium to Tricom ===
Created in March 1986 and born from the desire of various European productions to work together, the European Consortium for Commercial Television brought together Fininvest, Robert Maxwell, Beta/Taurus and SEPC (holding of French participations in La Cinq's capital). Initially, the consortium had to manage the satellite broadcast of La Cinq and La Sept, the future cultural channel via the TDF1 satellite. However, the Chirac government put an end to the project. The Consortium then turned to the co-production of prestige fiction, until its dissolution in early 1989 after the withdrawal of the Chargeurs group. Another private initiative was noteworthy: The European Consortium, created in March 1986 by Mr. Seydoux (Chargeurs Image), Mr. Berlusconi (Fininvest Rete Italia), Mr. Kirch (Beta/Taurus) and the infamous Mr. Maxwell, broke up at the beginning of 1989 after the withdrawal of the French partner. It had focused on the development of prestige projects (4-hour mini-series with a budget of around 30 MF), after having seen the concession for two channels on the TDF 1 satellite withdrawn. The confiscation of the channel's advertising management by Robert Hersant, and his initiatives to acquire programs outside the Fininvest catalog will encourage the Italian to ally with the rival group. On 27 April 1989, Berlusconi enters TF1's with shares up to 3,9%. This was how Tricom was born, a production company owned by Silvio Berlusconi, Leo Kirch, and TF1.

=== Hachette's La Cinq ===
Beginning in 1987, La Cinq ran into serious financial problems that would later be escalated by the privatization of TF1 in the late 1980s and the early 1990s recession. Robert Hersant took over the channel in February 1987 and would remain the channel's president until September 1990, when Fininvest sold the channel to Hachette. In 1989, the channel's audience share peaked at 13.0%.

Under the weight of the debts accumulated since 1987 caused by the failure of a large portion of the programs created, Robert Hersant criticized Berlusconi for selling American series that were too expensive. The latter disapproved of the great importance that Hersant gives to information, deeming it costly and unprofitable. Hersant, after a legal battle, realized that La Cinq's debt burden was threatening to crush his media group; he then ceded his share in La Cinq to the Hachette group, then directed by Jean-Luc Lagardère, an unsuccessful candidate for the acquisition of TF1 in 1987 and who dreamt of acquiring a national television channel. Thanks to a capital increase, Hachette increased its stake in la Cinq from 22 to 25% while Hersant reduced it from 25 to 10%.

In September 1989, Télé-Métropole asked Robert Hersant to modify his management strategy to protect his investment even though the channel had lost nearly 400 million dollars since its launch. Finally Télé-Métropole resold its shares at a profit in May 1990 after having injected 6.5 million dollars. Under the weight of debts accumulated since 1987 caused by the failure of a large part of the programs created, Robert Hersant criticizes Berlusconi for selling his American fiction too expensively. The latter disapproves of the too much emphasis Hersant places on information, deeming it costly and unprofitable. Hersant, after a legal battle, realizes that the weight of the Five's debts threatens to crush his press group; he then sold his share in La Cinq to the Hachette group led by Jean-Luc Lagardère, an unsuccessful candidate for the takeover of TF1 in 1987 and who dreamed of acquiring a national television channel. Thanks to a capital increase, Hachette increases its stake in Cinq from 22 to 25% while Hersant reduces it from 25 to 10%. On 23 October 1990, the Superior Audiovisual Council granted the channel to Hachette, which promised to "save La Cinq".

When Yves Sabouret and Hachette took over control of La Cinq in the fall of 1990, the channel's audience share had declined to 11.7%. Instead of trying to reduce the channel's budget deficit, Hachette commissioned an abundance of newer television series, including American import Twin Peaks and the game show Que le meilleur gagne. The continued commission and production of newer programs by La Cinq increased the channel's budget deficit significantly; by mid-1991, the channel's deficit amounted to 3.5 billion francs. As a result, Berlusconi sold the rights of several of the children's programs to AB Productions; those programs were subsequently moved to TF1 before the end of the year.

1991 began with the Gulf War, allowing its newscasts to reach more than 9% of market share.

Hachette began changing everything, starting with the identity of the channel. Jean-Luc Lagardère gave a blank check to his program director, Pascal Josèphe, whom he had just hired from Antenne 2, to launch new programs concocted by Hachette, which was hoped to make La Cinq a large family generalist channel capable of competing against TF1. In fact, the channel was also obliged to produce new programs because the stock of American series was becoming scarce. From April 1991, Pascal Josèphe put the prime time access schedule on the air which he intended for Antenne 2 and which he revised.

=== Business failure and bankruptcy ===
Instead of trying to reduce costs and make up for the existing deficit, Hachette was increasing expenses (rebranding network identity, repairing all the premises, creating too many programs), and La Cinq had completely changed. Pascal Josèphe wished to focus on female and family audiences. Guillaume Durand was replaced at 8pm in order to open up to the audience. The slots devoted to news were diminished; Patrice Duhamel also gave instructions to journalists to reduce coverage on international subjects and reports in favour of national subjects.

As a result, 22 new programs were put on the air in April 1991, but they all stopped after a few weeks or months, without succeeding in significantly increasing its market share with the exception of motorsports, with 40% of market share, for Formula 1 snatched from TF1, the Paris-Dakar, the Grand Prix de Pau, the Walt Disney movie slots on Tuesday evenings, Twin Peaks and the news, which were successful. La Cinq only experienced success in urban areas.

Not only did its new programs fail to attract new viewers, but these upheavals confused some of the faithful audience, to the point that the channel announced a rerun of Kojak to save the prime time access slot. Game show La Ligne de chance and sitcom Léon Duras, chroniqueur mondain did not find their public.

The audience remained stable, and the channel remained the third national channel in terms of rating; however, considering the new transmitters that relayed La Cinq's signal, the audience was reduced at this time. It was, in this case, around 11 to 14%. In addition, Lagardère did not succeed in relaxing the constraints imposed by the government and regulations, so it remained at the mercy of political power.

The channel planned to launch an interactive system, Carte Multipoints, in 1992, in association with Canadian company Vidéotron, to compete with Quizako on Antenne 2 and FR3. Due to the network's bankruptcy, the channel never tested the system. France Télévisions' two channels ultimately ended up using the system in 1993, after Quizako ended its run, until July 1995. The Carte Multipoints system had a two-year lifespan, unlike Quizako, which lasted one year.

=== Bankruptcy ===
One year after its takeover by Hachette, the channel's annual deficit amounted to 1.1 billion francs (US$200 million), with cumulative losses since the channel's creation amounting to 3.5 billion francs (US$640 million). On 17 December 1991, its CEO, Yves Sabouret, in a cost-cutting move, had to forcibly lay off 576 employees, amounting to more than 75% of the channel's staff. This did not have any effect on the channel, as it would file for bankruptcy only fourteen days later. The decision was announced by Béatrice Schönberg and Gilles Schneider during their 8 PM newscast, which ended with its previous 1987 intro. A few days later, interviewed by Jean-Claude Bourret during the 8pm news, the CEO would hear the presenter say that the action taken "looks like a Formula 1 racing team that sells the tires to buy the gasoline". On-screen, the "5" logo was displayed in black for 24 hours while a banner indicating that "La 5 will not be Matra-Racing" was brandished in the offices of the editorial staff. The channel's flags on its headquarters at Boulevard Pereire were torn down by staff. On 31 December 1991, La Cinq filed for bankruptcy. It was officially declared bankrupt on 2 January 1992 and placed in legal redress the following day, due to its inability to repay its entire debt.

=== AB's involvement (1990-1992) ===
- Anime and German series: AB Distribution appeared to provide cartoons for its TF1's children's slot (Club Dorothée) and managed the rights for all in-house productions. It then bought the distribution rights to Japanese productions. In its original catalog there were many animes. The company owed French viewers to its introduction to Saint Seiya, Dragon Ball et Dragon Ball Z, later Dr Slump, Nicky Larson, Fist of the North Star and many others.

After becoming aware of Decree n°. 90-66 of 17 January 1990 explaining that each channel must air 60% of European content per year, Claude Berda decided to acquire the rights to all European series and TV movies that were available, among them the German series Derrick and Der Alte. AB became one of La Cinq's first suppliers.

- The cartoons seen on Club Dorothée: During the war between TF1 and La Cinq, at the beginning of 1991, Berlusconi, who felt that the ship was sinking, sold the rights to La Cinq's historical cartoons to his great rival AB Productions. In fact, AB plays both sides: in order to neutralize the fifth channel, TF1 broadcasts, via AB program, Salut les filles, a new series aimed at La Cinq. However, AB aired it under the name Tommy et Magalie most of the time removing the theme performed by Claude Lombard. In the process, Club Dorothée also managed to air Robotech, Princess Sarah, Captain Tsubasa, Le Petit Lord, Max et Compagnie or Embrasse-moi Lucile, renamed Lucile, amour et Rock'n Roll, etc. As a result, the channel had to change suppliers to Saban, with Samurai Pizza Cats and Pinocchio: The Series.

Ironically, La Cinq, emptied of its historical cartoons which made the success of Youpi ! L'école est finie, also had to supply with AB Productions, who transfers his stock funds to the network. In early 1991, the network aired Goldorak, Candy Candy, Paul le pêcheur, Nadia, le secret de l'eau bleue, etc.

AB, by means of its animation production subsidiary Animage, had bought the Berlusconi catalog, and resold part of it to La Cinq.

Only two unaired series were: La Reine du fond des temps and Théo ou la Batte de la victoire.

=== Stars and celebrities at the channel's downfall ===
During its last months on air, several personalities took turns on the channel's news service's set to support the channel or bury it.

=== Closure of the channel ===
A viewers' defence association for La Cinq started on 3 January 1992, led by Jean-Claude Bourret. On 7 January 1992, Régie 5, the channel's advertising agency, reintroduces advertising breaks in its newscasts (Operation Pub Info), in order to keep the channel afloat.

On 15 January, Berlusconi proposed a plan involving an increase in capital that would have saved the channel.

On 25 January, Charles Pasqua aimed to create a joint-stock company and joined forces with Silvio Berlusconi to take over the network.

On 24 March, Berlusconi threw in the towel, as the plan to save the channel was revoked under pressure from the government and influence of certain politicians. A group of private channels (TF1, Canal+ and M6) jointly proposed the creation of a news channel which would replace La Cinq. The objective was twofold—to drive Berlusconi away from the French market and to ensure that the fifth network slot would no longer host a commercial channel.

As a result of the withdrawal of the rescue plan, on 3 April 1992, the tribunal de commerce de Paris announced that, effective 12 April 1992 at midnight CET, La Cinq would be shut down and its assets liquidated.

Its final program, titled Il est moins 5, was broadcast that evening beginning at 20:45. It was filmed in the network's editorial office and pulled in an audience share of 21.5% (equal to about 6 to 7 million viewers). The program ended with an animation of a planet with the number 5 orbiting around it being eclipsed by static noise, as the opening to Also sprach Zarathustra (former news theme) was played, followed by a pair of text slides which read:

- La Cinq vous prie de l'excuser pour cette interruption définitive de l'image et du son
  C'est fini
- La Cinq apologises for this permanent loss of picture and sound
  It's over

— La Cinq channel closedown message on 12 April 1992

On 23 April, the State preempted the fifth terrestrial network to install Arte there, which was broadcast there in the evening from 28 September 1992, joined during the day by La Cinquième (which became France 5 on 7 January 2002) from 13 December 1994, making a return of La Cinq impossible in its old form.

The Hachette group compensated AB productions (Animage) to the tune of 41 million francs.

== Branding ==
La Cinq was one of the first French television channels to utilize a digital on-screen graphic when it launched in 1986. Its initial logo was derived from the first logo of Canale 5, which was introduced in 1985. However, the flower and the stylised symbol of the biscione were replaced with a gold star and the channel's name, respectively. In 1987, the channel's name was removed from the logo, which would continue to be used (albeit with a minor modification in October 1990) until 2 April 1991.

The channel's second and final logo, which was designed by Jean-Paul Goude, consisted of the number 5 being superimposed on other numbers. It would be used from 2 April 1991 until the channel's liquidation on 12 April 1992. The DOG accompanying the logo only displayed the number 5. It was inspired by the work of Jasper Johns (founding father of pop art), who produced canvases featuring numbers in the 1960s.

== News operation ==
La Cinq's news operation consisted of a series of daily newscasts entitled Le Journal ("The News"). The program was originally presented with a lunchtime newscast at 12:30 p.m. (later 1:00 p.m.) and a primetime newscast at 8:00 p.m. In the summer of 1990, the lunchtime newscast was moved to 12:45 p.m., where it would remain until the channel's closure in April 1992. Short-form news updates were also broadcast at various times of the day during breaks in the channel's programming.

From 1987 to April 1991, the theme music for the newscasts was a modified version of Also sprach Zarathustra (which would later be used on the channel's final newscast on 12 April 1992). During that time, the openings to all of the newscasts featured a rotating globe and a satellite, before showing the channel's logo and the newscast's title. When La Cinq's logo was changed in April 1991, the newscasts' openings were changed to a variant of the channel's ident with the word Information superimposed onto the channel's logo; this would be used until shortly before the channel's closure one year later. It was accompanied by a hard-hitting news music package.

=== Notable former on-air staff ===
- Jean-Claude Bourret (main anchor; 1987–1992)
- Marie-Laure Augry (1991–1992; later worked at TF1 and France 3)
- Guillaume Durand (1987–1991; later worked at Europe 1)
- Béatrice Schönberg (1991–1992; later worked at France 2)
