= Les Musclés =

French musical group

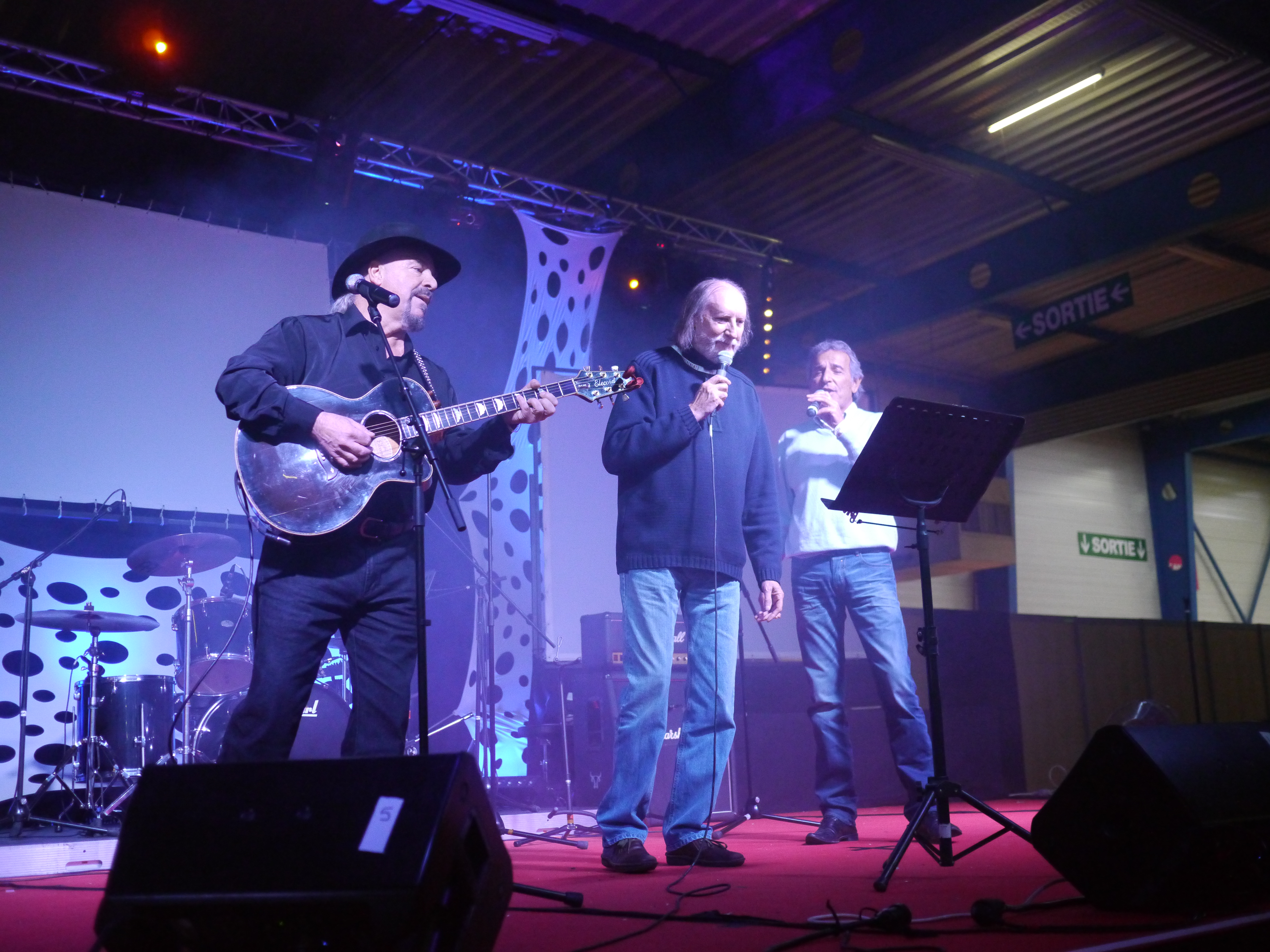
Toulouse Game Show Festival; 6th impact, 2012

Les Musclés were a French music band in the 1990s. The Musclés were Framboisier (singer, died 2015), Rémy (bass guitarist), Éric (guitarist), René (accordionist) and Bernard Minet (drummer).

Les Musclés started as Dorothée's orchestra in the Club Dorothée TV show, but also had a career as an independent band. A few of their singles were hits in France, such as La fête au village ("The village party") (2nd in the 1989 charts), Moi j'aime les filles ("I like girls") (12th in the 1989 charts), Merguez party (25th in the 1990 charts) and the Musclada (8th in the 1992 charts). They won five golden records during their career.

The band disbanded in 1997, when Club Dorothée stopped airing.

During the 2007 French presidential election, they came back with a single and a clip "Nicolas et Ségolène", a parody about Nicolas Sarkozy and Ségolène Royal.

Rene Morizur died on 26 August 2009. Claude Chamboisier alias "Framboisier" died on 4 January 2015.
