= Bernard Minet =

French singer and actor (born 1953)

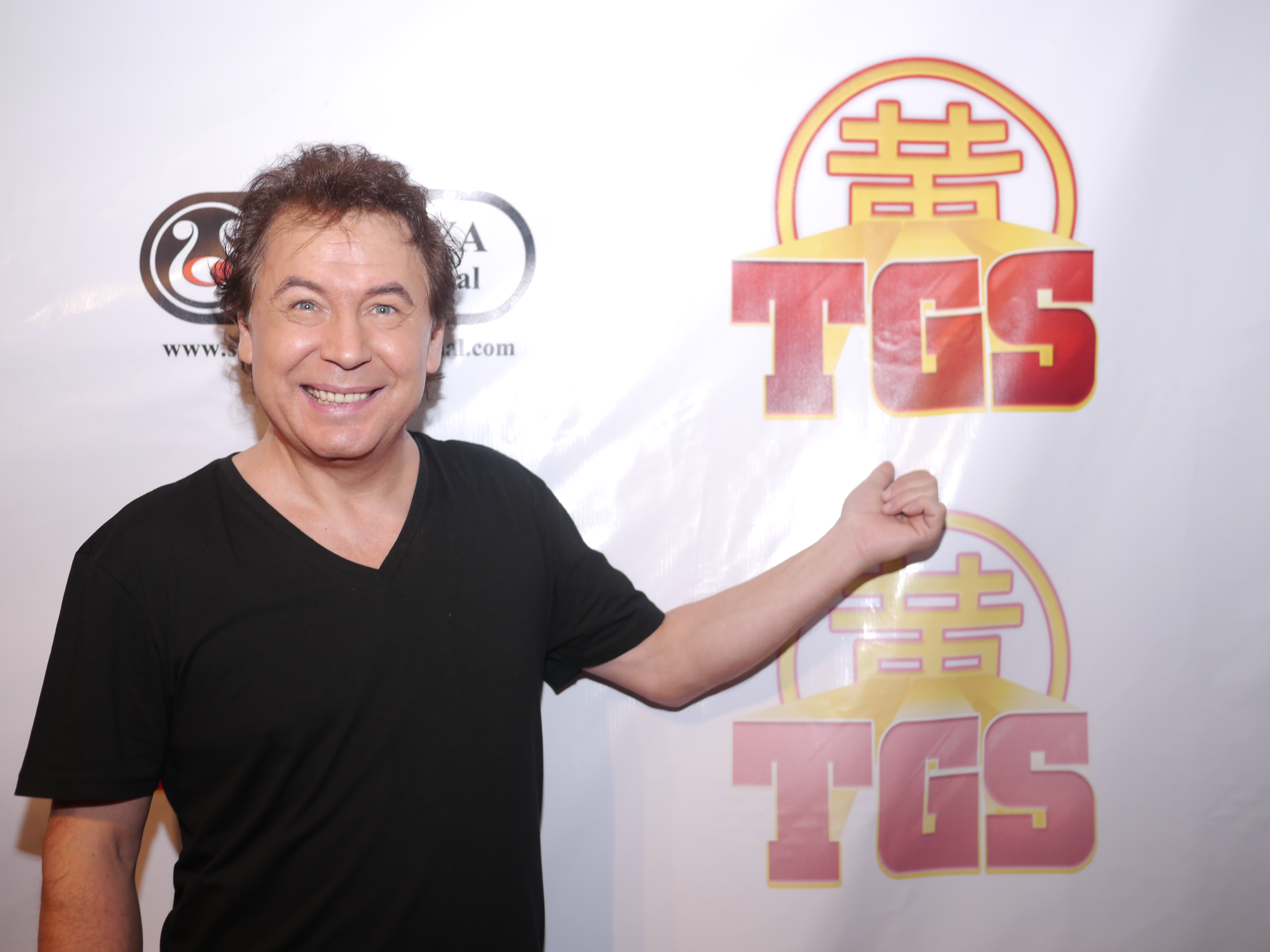
Toulouse Game Show 2011 – Bernard Minet

Bernard Minet (born 28 December 1953 in Hénin-Beaumont as Bernard Wantier) is a French singer and actor.

He started his career in Pas-de-Calais in 1969 and arrived in Paris in 1970, where he was part of several bands during his studies: "Pop", the "Baloches" and the "Golf Drouot." In 1974, he won first prize in percussion at the Conservatoire national de Paris. In 1983, he started a collaboration with Dorothée and joined the band Les Musclés as a drummer. He also pursued a career as a solo artist.

He also played in 482 episodes of the Salut les Musclés and La Croisière Foll'Amour sitcoms.

In the 1980s and early 1990s, he recorded French songs for the Bioman, Turboranger, Winspector, Saint Seiya (Les Chevaliers du Zodiaque) and Sailor Moon Japanese anime series. The melodies and lyrics have little relationship with the original songs of these series.
