= William Leymergie =

French journalist and television producer

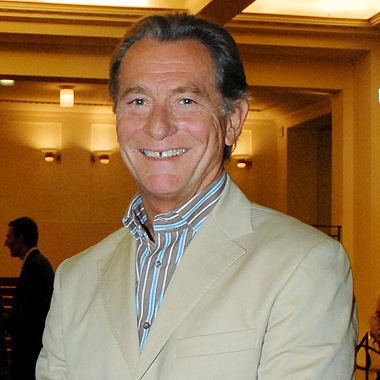
- Born: 4 February 1947 (age 78); Libourne, France
- Education: Paris Nanterre University
- Occupations: TV host Télématin (1985-2017) on France 2 William à Midi on C8 (since 2017)

William Leymergie (born 4 February 1947 in Libourne) is a French journalist television producer and host, best known for the French breakfast television news show Télématin, broadcast on public broadcaster France 2 and TV5 in Canada.

== Biography ==
After completing an arts degree at University of Paris X: Nanterre, Leymergie began his career at the External Affairs and Cooperation department (now Radio France Internationale) of the Office de Radiodiffusion Télévision Française (ORTF) in 1970. In 1972, he joined the children's programming department as well as the France Inter radio station. In 1974, he became a journalist at the TF1 television network.

After a period at the National Audiovisual Institute (INA), Leymergie worked as a journalist in the children's programming department of Antenne 2 from 1978 to 1984, where he produced programmes such as Disney Dimanche in 1979 and Récré A2 in 1980.

Starting in 1985, he has hosted France 2's morning show, Télématin, which he has also produced since 1990. His only other television activity during this period was a stint co-hosting the 13:00 Antenne 2 news with Patricia Charnelet from 1987 to 1990. During this period, the broadcast beat the 13:00 TF1 news, read by Yves Mourousi, in the ratings, which has not happened again since.

Leymergie sang the French-language version of the theme song of the television series based on the Pac-Man arcade game, and has appeared in small roles in various movies.

== Filmography ==
=== As producer ===
- C'est au programme (since 1998)
- Télématin (since 1990)
- Récré A2 (1980)
- Quelle histoire !

=== As actor ===
- Les Misérables (1995)
- Hommes, femmes, mode d'emploi (1996)
- Le courage d'aimer (2005)
- Chacun sa vie et son intime conviction (2017)

=== Discography ===
- "Pac Man" (single, 1985)

=== Bibliography ===
- Fréquence Mômes : les enfants ont la parole, Belfond/France Inter (1995)
- Paroles de gosses, Albin Michel (1997)
- Quand les grands étaient petits, Fayard (2009)

== Awards and recognition ==
- Prix Média – Fondation pour l'enfance (1992) for Fréquence Mômes on France Inter
- Prix de l'Association Défense de la langue française (1993) for Télématin
- Knight – Ordre National du Mérite
- Knight – Légion d'honneur
- Knight - Ordre des Arts et des Lettres
