= François Corbier =

French singer, musician and poet (1944 - 2018)

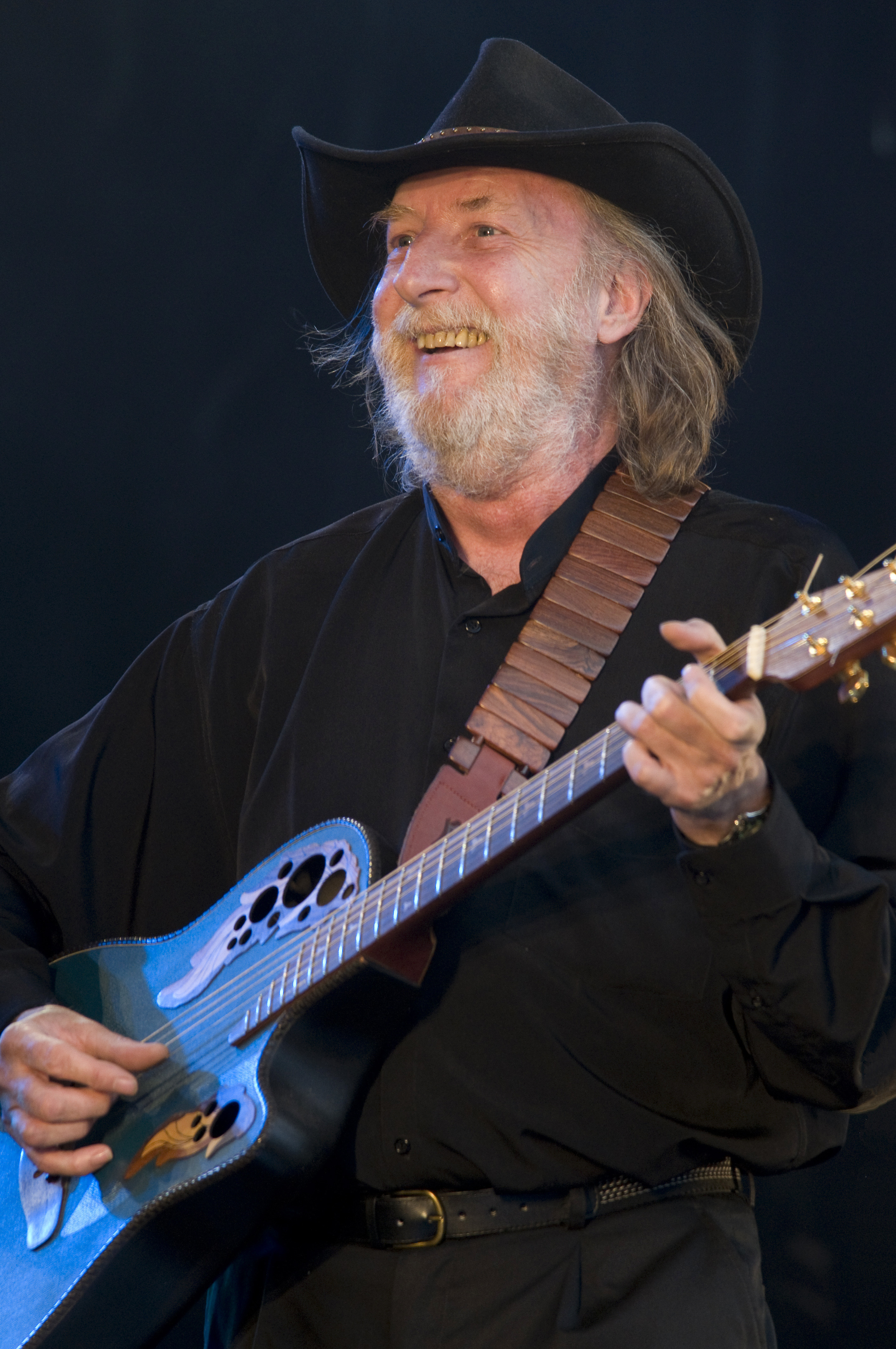
- Born: Alain Roux; 17 October 1944; Paris, France
- Died: 1 July 2018 (aged 73); Évreux, France
- Occupation: Television presenter
- Employer: TF1
- Known for: Co-presenter Club Dorothée

François Corbier (French pronunciation: [fʁɑ̃swa kɔʁbje]; 17 October 1944 – 1 July 2018) was a French television presenter and songwriter.

== Early life ==
Corbier was born as Alain Roux in 1944 in Paris.

== Career ==
Corbier began his career as a songwriter in Parisian cabarets, where he worked from 1962 to 1982. He became a television presenter on Récré A2, a programme with singer Dorothée on Antenne 2, in 1982. He was a co-presenter of Club Dorothée on TF1 from 1987 to 1997.

Corbier authored several songs, including Le Nez de Dorothée in 1986. He released several albums, including Vieux Lion in 2015.

Corbier performed alongside Dorothée at the Palais Bercy and Olympia in 2010. He authored his autobiography in 2012.

== Personal life and death ==
Corbier resided in Évreux, where he died of cancer on 1 July 2018, aged 73.

== Works ==
- Corbier, Francois (2012). Vous étiez dans "Dorothée"?. L'Escarène: Mille plumes. ISBN 9782358260800. OCLC 828231988.
