= Quizako =

Remote control for interactive television

Quizako, known in Italy as Quizzy and in Spain as Teletrébol, was a French remote control, used to interact with certain programs aired by Antenne 2 and FR3 from 1991 to 1992.

== History and description ==
The Quizako remote appeared in France in November 1991, commercialized in France by Info-Realités, a company based in Vendenheim. The remote was activated in certain shows (especially game shows) such as Giga, Cekanon and Animalia. The remote's software was French, the microchip was Japanese and the manufacturing was Chinese. Info-Realités had planned to distribute 500,000 units in France and had signed contracts with British, German and Danish channels, by selling 10 million units abroad. If a question was answered correctly, the remote would play La Marseillaise, the French national anthem.

The release of the Quizako remote in France came ahead of a planned move by La Cinq to release its own interactive service, also manufactured in Southeast Asia, with support from Canadian company Vidéotron.

Out of the 500,000 units that were sent to France, approximately 135,000 were bought, 40,000 of which were used regularly. The system, which had one-year period of usage in France according to the manufacturer, ended on December 31, 1992.

In 1992–1993, the device was used by Silvio Berlusconi's main channels in Spain and Italy.

The remote was released in Spain by Telecinco as Teletrébol on June 19, 1992, being marketed by Conditec. Due to a legal problem with Conditec, a winner in Gijón Province only received his car in 1999, after a series of appeals led by Unión de Consumidores de Asturias.

In Italy, as Quizzy, it was promoted by Canale 5's Mike Bongiorno as "a personalized remote control which erases the barriers of space and time". The remote was used in its gameshows, La ruota della fortuna and Tutti per uno, as well as some Rete 4 game shows. Reteitalia also released a Tutto Quizzy magazine which also featured other uses for the remote and the answers of the week's questions.

In non-French units of the remote, the victory theme was changed to Ode to Joy.
