= Les Aventures électriques de Zeltron =

Les Aventures électriques de Zeltron is an educational children's television series broadcast on Antenne 2's Récré A2 program in France and TVJQ in Quebec, Canada. The show was sponsored by Électricité de France (EDF) and was produced from 1979 to 1982. The companies D-3-mil and CIP Vidéo worked on the show and the staff included Marcel Dupouy.

The show features an extraterrestrial named Zeltron (voiced by Michel Elias), who resembles a small greeninsulator with orange limbs and a bolt on top of his blue head, as he teaches electricity-related subjects and history. Some episodes include his adventures and conversations with Jo and Jessie, a boy and girl living on Earth. Episodes end with a question the viewer can answer through postcard. Another character is the robot Voltix.

In the show's production, Zeltron and Voltix are marionettes with different colors than they appear in the show. A process was used to achieve cartoon-like visuals for the two characters. Early in the show's run, the backgrounds were illustrated before switching to reel footage.

The character Zeltron was created by François Castan and made earlier appearances at the Salon de l'enfance and Les Visiteurs du mercredi in 1978. Zeltron was merchandised through products such as comics published by GP, plastic figurines, and a key ring of Zeltron with movable eyes. According to Yves Bouvier of the University of Savoy, Zeltron was the most successful EDF effort at teaching the concepts of electricity and promoting its brand towards children.
