= Patricia Charnelet =

French journalist

Patricia Charnelet, born 2 July 1951 in the 8th arrondissement of Paris, is a French journalist and was the presenter of the news show 13 Heures on Antenne 2 from 1986 at 1989.

== Biography ==
Patricia Charnelet presented with William Leymergie, from September 1986 to December 1989, the news show 13 Heures on TV station Antenne 2, which was the most watched midday in France. She also occasionally presented the news show 20 heures during the summer. After 25 years at the heart of journalism at TV station France 2, she is now, since 2000, orientated towards Internet work, and is now a private consultant and media trainer.
