= Béatrice Schönberg =

French journalist

- Born: Béatrice Szabo; 9 May 1953 (age 73); Paris, France
- Occupations: Journalist television presenter
- Employer(s): La Cinq (1987–1992); France 2 (1997–2007)
- Spouses: Claude-Michel Schönberg (divorced); Jean-Louis Borloo (m. 2005)

Béatrice Schönberg (née Béatrice Szabo; 9 May 1953) is a French journalist and television presenter.

She anchored the newscasts on La Cinq from 1987 to 1992.

From 1997 to 2007, Schönberg presented the weekend edition of France 2's Journal de 20 heures (8 p.m. Newscast).

She was formerly married to the musician and composer Claude-Michel Schönberg.

On 21 July 2005, she married the French politician Jean-Louis Borloo at Rueil-Malmaison, Hauts-de-Seine. The journalists' union SDJ (Société des journalistes) then called for her resignation.

In September 2006, France 2 announced they had agreed with Schönberg. Effective 25 February 2007, she was replaced as a news anchor by Laurent Delahousse but would continue with the network as the host of a prime-time science program. She did not return to the network after the second part of the presidential election in May 2007 because her husband was given a cabinet post in President Nicolas Sarkozy's government.
