= Marie-Laure Augry =

French journalist

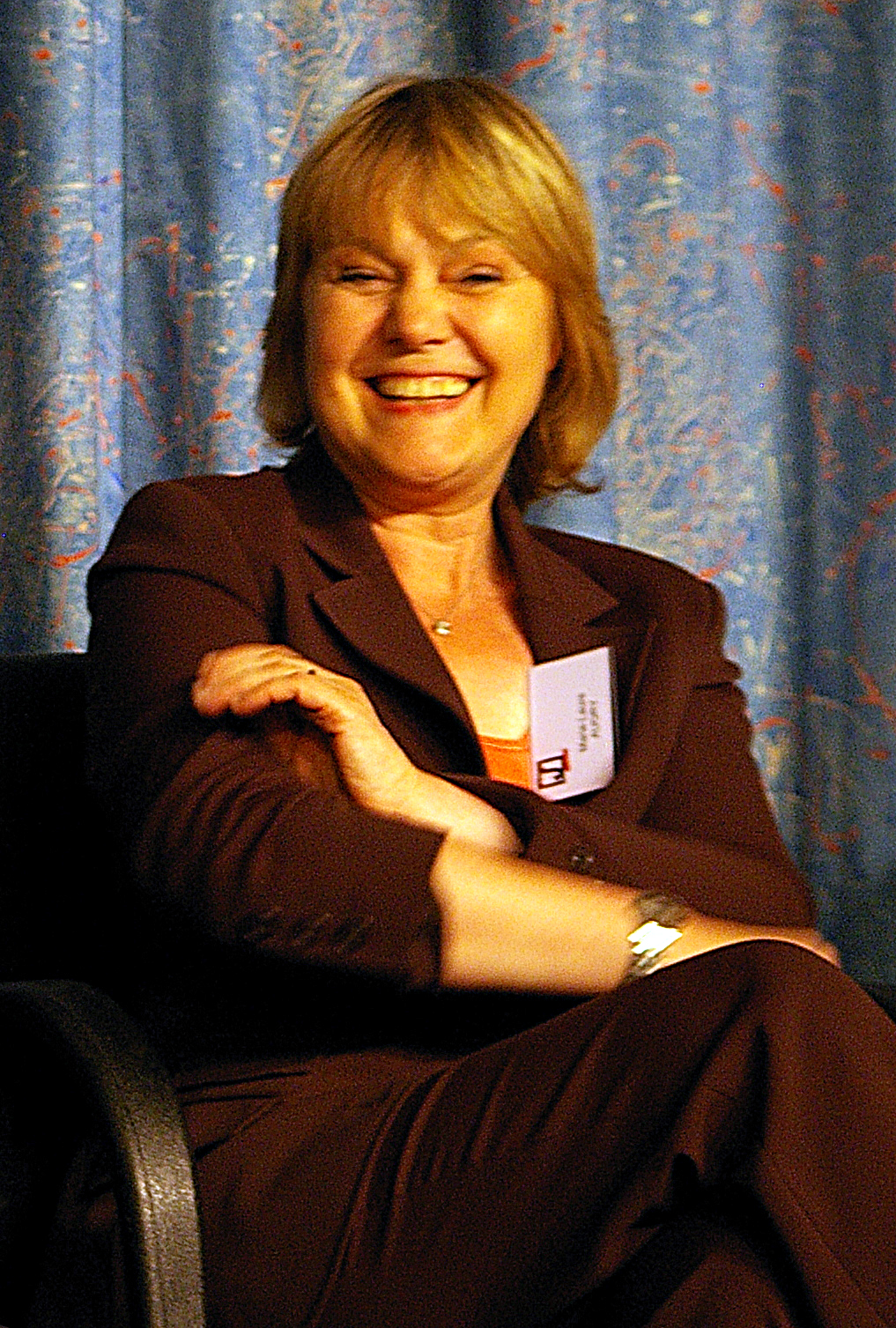
- Born: 27 February 1947 (age 79); Tours
- Occupation: journalist
- Writing career
- Genre: non-fiction

Marie-Laure Augry (born 27 February 1947 in Tours) is a French journalist. She is a member of the Club des médiateurs de la presse ((in French) "Press mediators' club").

== Career ==
After studying journalism at the IUT of Tours, Augry joined ORTF as a political journalist in October 1972, before becoming a reporter in 1974, covering educational and youth issues. She continued as a reporter for TF1 and became a newsreader in July 1975.

From 1981 to 1988, she co-presented TF1's 1pm daily news magazine show, alongside Yves Mourousi. Between 1988 and 1991, she hosted a weekly magazine show bearing her name, Allo Marie-Laure, on TF1. In 1991, she joined La Cinq ((in French) "Channel Five") to present the lunchtime news on weekdays and Histoires vraies ((in French) "True Stories") with Paul Lefevre. A year later, following the collapse of La Cinq, Yves Mourousi, then Program Director of RMC, gave her a daily show called Passion, which she continued for two years.

In 1993, France 3 offered her the chance to host a daily show, "Generation 3" co-produced with the CNDP (National Centre for Educational Documentation). From 1995 to 2002, she was editor and presenter of the daily magazine Un jour en France ((in French) "One day in France") on France 3. Since September 1, 2003, she has been editor of France 3.

She is president of the "Club des médiateurs de presse" group, nominated in 2009, and assembled by Bruno Frappat, to develop a new code of ethics for journalists, and act as ombudsmen.
