= Fabeltjeskrant =

Dutch children's television series

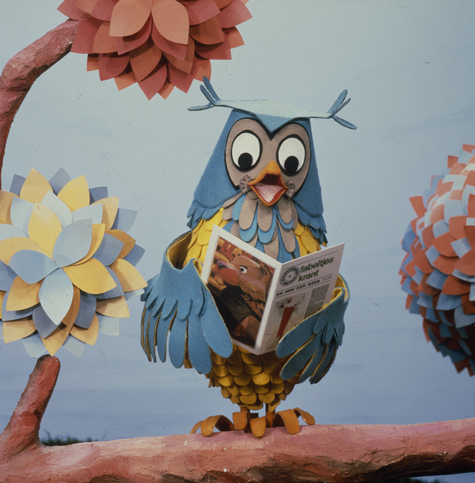
- "Meneer de Uil", the main character of the series
- Based on: The work of Leen Valkenier
- Country of origin: Netherlands
- No. of episodes: 1640

Production
- Producers: Thijs Chanowski; Loek de Levita; Kari Thomée (Swedish version); Max Matsuura (Japanese version); Charles Gillibert (French version)
- Running time: 4/5 minutes

Original release
- Network: NOS (Netherlands); Récré A2 (France); RAI 1 / TMC (Italy); NRK (Norway); SVT (Sweden); ITV (UK); NHK (Japan)
- Release: 29 September 1968 – 4 October 1989

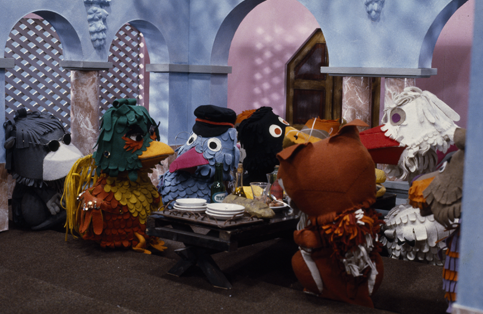
Some characters of the series

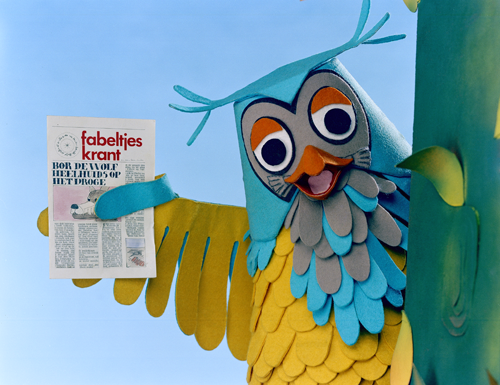
Meneer de Uil with the newspaper "Fabeltjeskrant"

(De) Fabeltjeskrant (Dutch pronunciation: [(də) ˈfaːbəltɕəsˌkrɑnt]; Dutch for "The Fables Newspaper") is a Dutch children's television series featuring puppetry and stop motion. Created in 1968 by Leen Valkenier and produced by Thijs Chanowski (1st series) and Loek de Levita (2nd series), it ended in 1989 and was broadcast on the Dutch channels NOS, RTL 4, and RTL 8; Japanese channel NHK; and on Belgian channel VRT. From 1973 to 1975 it was broadcast also in the United Kingdom, on ITV, with the title The Daily Fable.

== Plot ==
Each episode is based upon fables of Jean de La Fontaine, Aesop, Phaedrus and also by the series' scenographer Leen Valkenier. The main character, the owl "Meneer de Uil", introduces each episode reading a fable to other characters upon a tree. The setting is a forest inhabited by different anthropomorphic felt animals. The first episode was broadcast on 29 September 1968 on NOS.

== Characters ==
=== Main characters ===
All character surnames are referred to their species:

- Meneer de Uil (Mr. Owl), or Jacob de Uil, is an owl and the main narrator and face of the series. In British version his name was "Mr. Owl".
- Juffrouw Ooievaar (Miss Stork in the British version)
- Lowieke de Vos (Mr. Cunningham in the British version)
- Crox de Raaf (or Meneer de Raaf) (Mr. Crow in the British version, in Dutch he is a raven)
- Bor de Wolf (Boris the Wolf in the British version)
- Ed Bever (Fred Beaver in the British version)
- Willem Bever (Bert Beaver in the British version)
- Zoef de Haas (Zippy the Hare in the British version)
- Stoffel de Schildpad (Shelly the Tortoise in the British version)
- Truus de Mier (Miss Ant in the British version)
- Gerrit de Postduif (Gerald the Pigeon in the British version)
- Meindert het Paard (Milord the Horse in the British version)
- Droes de Beer (Harold the Bear in the British version)
- Jodokus de Marmot (George the Guinea Pig in the British version)
- Isadora Paradijsvogel
- Myra Hamster
- Martha Hamster
- Momfer de Mol
- Chico Lama
- Margaretha "Greta" Bontekoe
- Zaza Zebra
- Woefdram

=== Later generation characters ===
These characters were not part of the first three series:

- Fatima de Poes, Iranian cat wearing a hijab, only appeared in the theater show (2007).
- Wally Windhond (2019), DJ Dog; both voice and music are done by Armin van Buuren.
- Peter Panda (2019)

=== Recurring characters from the first two series ===
- Tijl Schavuit and Sjefke Schelm, two dodgy characters that first starred in the 70s feature film and then became recurring characters.
- Piet de Pad
- Oléta Vulpécula
- Teun Stier
- Snoespoes
- Woef Hektor
- Hondje Woef
- Greta 2
- Borita
- Harry Lepelaar
- "Mister" John Maraboe
- Blinkert de Bliek and his girlfriend Frija Forel
- Melis Das
- Pepijn de Kater
- Plons de Kikvors

== In other countries ==
The show was adapted in some other countries under the following titles:

- France: Le petit écho de la Forêt (French for The Little Echo of the Forest)
- Hungary: Fabulácskahírek (Hungarian for The Fables Newspaper)
- Israel: Sipurimpo (Hebrew for Stories Here)
- Italy: La fiaba quotidiana (Italian for The daily fairy tale)
- Norway: Fablenes bok (Norwegian for The book of Fables)
- Sweden: Fablernas värld (Swedish for World of Fables)
- United Kingdom: The Daily Fable
- Peru: Las Crónicas de Fabulandia (Spanish for Chronicles of Fableland)
- Mexico: Las Crónicas de Fabulandia (Spanish for Chronicles of Fableland)
- Japan: "Fachishu shinbun" (Japanese for The animals of Fables village)
- Poland: Leśna gazetka (Polish for Forest newspaper)

In Sweden, France, and the United Kingdom, the show was refilmed especially for those specific countries. The Hebrew and Italian versions were dubbings of the English adaptation.

== Adaptations ==
Lex Overeijnder wrote and drew a short-lived newspaper comic strip based on the TV show in 1969. In 1975 Dick Vlottes created another comic strip based on the series, which was published in the TV magazine Televizier in 1975.

In 1970, a film version, Onkruidzaaiers in Fabeltjesland, premiered in theaters.

In 2007 a musical adaptation was created by Ruud de Graaf and Hans Cornelissen.

== Comeback ==
A CGI animation series based on the original work was broadcast in 2019 on Netflix in the Netherlands.

== See also ==
- Sesamstraat (another Dutch children's television series featuring puppetry)
