= Jacqueline Joubert =

French television announcer, producer and director (1921-2005)

- Born: Jacqueline Annette Édith Pierre; 29 March 1921; Paris, France
- Died: 8 January 2005 (aged 83); Neuilly-sur-Seine, France
- Occupations: Television continuity announcer, producer and director
- Spouses: Georges de Caunes (m. 1953; div. 1960): Philippe Lagier
- Children: Antoine de Caunes
- Relatives: Emma de Caunes (granddaughter)

Jacqueline Annette Édith Pierre (29 March 1921 – 8 January 2005), known professionally as Jacqueline Joubert (French pronunciation: [ʒaklin ʒubɛʁ]), was a French television continuity announcer, producer and director. Alongside Arlette Accart, Joubert was one of the first two in-vision continuity announcers (or speakerines) when television commenced in France after the Second World War.

== Life ==
She was married to the journalist Georges de Caunes (1953–60), was the mother of Canal+ TV star Antoine de Caunes, and the grandmother of actress Emma de Caunes. She had also been married to Philippe Lagier. Alongside continuity duties, she presented the 1959 and 1961 editions of the Eurovision Song Contest, both held in Cannes. She began to produce and direct entertainment shows in 1966 before switching to producing children's programming for Antenne 2 from 1977 until 1990 - in the process, devising the popular magazine show Récré A2 and launching the television career of singer and actress Dorothée. She died in Neuilly-sur-Seine in 2005, aged 83.

== Selected filmography ==
- Paris Still Sings (1951)
- First Criminal Brigade (1962)

== See also ==
- List of Eurovision Song Contest presenters

Preceded by (Netherlands) Hannie Lips	Eurovision Song Contest presenter 1959	Succeeded by (United Kingdom) Katie Boyle
Preceded by (United Kingdom) Katie Boyle	Eurovision Song Contest presenter 1961	Succeeded by (Luxembourg) Mireille Delannoy
