= Yves Mourousi =

French journalist (1942–1998)

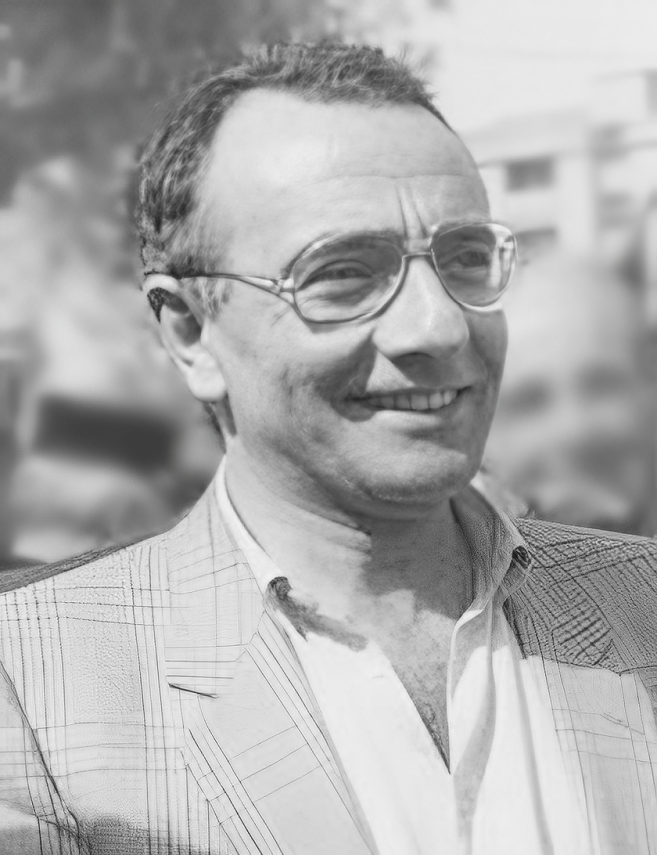
- Mourousi in 1983
- Born: 20 July 1942; Suresnes, France
- Died: 7 April 1998 (aged 55); Paris, France
- Education: Lycée Lakanal
- Occupation: TV journalist
- Spouse: Véronique Audemard (d. 1992)
- Children: 1

Yves Mourousi (20 July 1942 – 7 April 1998) was a French television and radio news presenter and journalist. He was the TF1 midday news anchor between 1975 and 1988.

== Early life ==
Mourousi was born in Suresnes in 1942 and was raised by his grandparents. He studied at the Lycée Lakanal in Sceaux.

== Career ==
Mourousi began his broadcasting career in the radio section of ORTF. His breakthrough came in 1967 when he covered an earthquake in Pau. In 1975, he transferred to TF1, where he hosted the television station's lunch-time news bulletin alongside Marie-Laure Augry.

Mourousi was known for beginning the news with the word "Bonjour". He was also known for his unconventional dress and manners, such as interviewing French president François Mitterrand while half-sitting on the latter's desk. Among prominent figures he interviewed were Leonid Brezhnev, Muammar Gaddafi, Edgard Pisani and Valéry Giscard d'Estaing.

In 1974, Félix Lévitan, co-director of the Tour de France cycling race, and Mourousi suggested a finish on the Champs-Élysées in Paris. Mourousi directly contacted French President Valéry Giscard d'Estaing to obtain permission.

During the 1980s, Mourousi was a member of the Association de la Presse du Music-Hall et du Cirque, a French press organization gathering journalists, critics, chroniclers, and personalities such as Pierre Cardin, Guy des Cars and Jean-Pierre Thiollet, interested in music-hall and circus, presided over by journalist Jacqueline Cartier.

Mourousi was dismissed from TF1 following its privatization and acquisition by Francis Bouygues in 1987. He subsequently worked for Radio Monte-Carlo and then as a publicist for motorbikes. He also wrote books on politics, organized variety shows and owned a bar called Look. He was also invited by the city of Paris to organize its Millennium celebrations before his death.

== Personal life and death ==
Mourousi was married to Veronique Audemar, who died of meningitis in 1992. They had one daughter, who was born in 1986.

Mourousi died from a heart attack in Paris on 7 April 1998.
