= Spartakus and the Sun Beneath the Sea =

1985 French animated series

- Main characters (title page without text)
- Genre: Post-apocalyptic; Science fiction Adventures; Mystery
- Created by: Nina Wolmark
- Written by: Nina Wolmark
- Directed by: Michel Gauthier
- Composer: Vladimir Cosma
- Country of origin: France
- No. of seasons: 2
- No. of episodes: 52

Production
- Running time: 20–25 minutes
- Production company: France Animation

Original release
- Network: Antenne 2
- Release: September 24, 1985 – March 26, 1987

Spartakus and the Sun Beneath the Sea (French: Les Mondes Engloutis, "The Engulfed Worlds") is a 1985–87 French animated series created by Nina Wolmark (who also a co-creator of Ulysses 31). The series consists of 52 episodes, each between 20 and 25 minutes in length, divided into two 26-episode seasons.

The program was first broadcast in France by Antenne 2 in September 1985. It was one of three children's animated programs that Antenne 2 had commissioned for their autumn schedule (the other two programs were Bibifoc and Clémentine).

== Opening narration ==
Ever since the time of the Great Cataclysm, the Arkadians have lived deep in the center of the Earth. They believed they were the only survivors of this great devastation. Their civilization thrived under the power of their sun, the Tehra... until it began to fail. In desperation, the children of Arkadia broke the law and entered the forbidden Archives, searching for a solution. What they discovered gave them hope. Anxiously, they used their special powers and created a messenger to the people above. They named her Arkana.

== Synopsis ==
The lost city of Arkadia (named for Arcadia) resembles a small Alderson disk, and is home to an ancient civilization which escaped a Great Cataclysm in the ancient past by relocating deep within the Earth's crust. Unaware that life continued on the Earth's surface, and hoping to keep their people safe, the elders sealed all records of their past in the underground city's Archives.

Arkadia survives by the light of an artificial sun, the Tehra (Shagma), which is dying. A group of young Arkadian kids and teens defy the law and enter the Archives. With information about the world above, they create a messenger, Arkana, and send her above to find help.

Arkana encounters two children from the surface, Matt and his sister Rebecca, and brings them back through the underground strata (which seem more like separate worlds or dimensions, with one strata even being the distant future) to save Arkadia. They travel in a living turtle type spaceship called Tehrig, along with Spartakus (a mysterious wanderer) and Bic and Bac (a pair of pangolin-like creatures), Arkadia's mascots.

== Characters ==
=== Main characters ===
Arkana: The Arkadian children created her out of stone with the help of the Tehra's rainbow light, as well as the avatar of all the Arkadians. As she was made in the image of the surface dwellers, she has legs, unlike the Arkadians themselves, who somehow lost them some time after the creation of the Tehra. She is a well-meaning but naïve magician, capable of telekinetic feats and projecting illusions. Her mission is to seek help from above in repairing the Tehra. She is referred to by the show's villains as the "supergeophysical gal". She seems to have a strong resemblance to an Arkadian scientist from the distant past, who helped in the creation of the Tehra.

Bic and Bac: Among the oldest living things in Arkadia, these two happy little animals are the best of friends, and enjoy dancing to their song, the "Flashbic." They are a kind of pangolin anteater, but unlike their real-life relatives, they have no scales or claws. They are affectionate, clever and playful, and can make fire by rubbing their noses together.

Matthew "Matt" (Bob) and Rebecca: Brother and sister, these children from above ground join Arkana and Spartakus on their quest to save Arkadia. Matt is the older of the two, and tries to protect his overeager sister, whom he affectionately calls "half-pint."

Spartakus: Once a gladiator in the city of Barkar, this young man escaped slavery following a revolt. His gauntlet conceals a magic crossbow, dagger, and grappling hook, and is eventually discovered to be made from auricite, which allows it to cause reactions when in close proximity to Arkadian artifacts. He remembers very little about his past, but often hums the songs his father taught him, or plays them on his mouth harp. His character is based on the historical Spartacus. It is suggested that his ancestors were people who left Arkadia in the distant past, before they lost their legs.

Tehrig (ShagShag): The only creature allowed free access to the Archives was Tehrig, an intelligent time traveling, interstellar, spaceship-type vehicle vaguely shaped like a giant trilobite. It secretly helped the children of Arkadia gain entry to the records and serves Arkana and her friends as a transport. Though its computer brain dates back to before the Great Cataclysm and possesses an encyclopedic database, there are large holes in its memory. It also contains a number of tiny robots called Triggies (Shaggies) that it can mobilize to distract enemies or repair itself.

The Pirates of the Seas: Members of the Interstrata Marine Pirate Federation, these "punk pirates" roam the strata seeking helpless voyagers to rob or enslave, and they frequently show up to menace the show's heroes. Their appearance is marked by a recurring theme song and dance performance. Their society is structured in the guise of a democracy controlled through mass media.

- Nasty Max (Maxagaze pun with "Masque à gaz" (gas mask)) has a large blue mohawk and leads the vicious band.
- Mighty Matt (Mattymatte), a simple-minded pirate with a small red mohawk, is Max's sidekick.
- Massmedia is Max's girlfriend and broadcasts radio station FIPIRATE from her radio craft. Her mohawk is blonde.
- Sleazeappeal (Seskapil, wordplay on "sex appeal" ), a sophisticated pirate with a green mohawk.

=== Recurring characters ===
Brigands of the Fjords: The Pirates of the Seas' rivals throughout the series. The only identified member is their leader, Ringnar, who frequently competes with Nasty Max for leadership of the nested worlds' rogues.

Shagmir and Loria: Two of Arkadia's elders. Arkana was presented to them and sent on her quest to the surface world. They tended to not believe the existence of any life on the surface.

The Inquisitors of the Living Crystal: This three-person tribunal of blue-skinned judges is first seen in the fifth episode of the first season, "Le cristal vivant" ("The Living Crystal"). They try to make Galileo renounce his claims of a world beyond the Living Crystal. They have the group captured and psychologically tested to convince them that they are beings who were caught in the Living Crystal and are suffering "a deformation of time". They are even prepared to re-crystallize Tehrig if Galileo does not renounce his beliefs. They are seen again in the second episode of the second season, "L'échiquier des mondes" ("The Most Dangerous Game").

Arkshag: Spartakus' nemesis and guardian of the Prisoners of the Lost Time. His purpose is to capture all Arkadians who have left the city, and imprison them. It is suggested that this was to be temporary, so that they could be transported back to Arkadia, as the prison's creator was an Arkadian who argued against those who decided to leave soon after the creation of the Tehra, but she died while traveling the strata, leaving them imprisoned forever.

=== Minor characters ===
Catchpenny (Quillsinger): A traveling minstrel and a friend of Spartakus.

Emperor Qin: The ruler of a Chinese-like empire within the strata. He marched out to conquer Arkadia. He was eventually killed amongst his army of clay robot-like warriors.

Galileo: A strata version of the real-world Galileo; he lives in the Living Crystal. When he discovers the group imprisoned in a crystallized Tehrig, he breaks them free. Their existence proves the prohibited theory that there is life outside of the living crystal. After being forced to deny the truth, he was allowed to leave with the group, but at the last moment returned home.

Gog and Magog: two monstrous creatures sharing the same body. They are unintentionally released to rage havoc by Arkana, who is misled by the Phoenix into using her powers. In the end they are both forced back to their own world.

Demosthenes: A famous spokesman, kidnapped by Nasty Max in order to help him learn the art of speaking and thus win election as leader of the Interstrata Pirate Federation. He was banished from his country because he did not have the walls repaired.

The Mogokhs: A nomadic warrior people who oppress and steal from others. They are notable for their invincibility. They never get down from their mounts for fear of being trampled to death.

Méo and Myra: A grandfather and his granddaughter who live in a village pillaged by the Mogokhs. They seek aid from the group, who help them overcome the Mogokhs.

Starkus: A scientist and Star Healer on board a space ship, he investigates and tries to "cure stars". He met with Rebecca and Matt and welcomed them. At first, he is willing to help them as soon as his present mission is finished. Upon hearing that they were accompanied by Spartakus and Arkana, he immediately disappears. Later, when the group returns to their own time and place (in the episode "Star Healer"), he contacts them via Tehrig and informs the surprised Arkana and Spartakus that they are his ancestors. He contacts them again during the series finale, with a message to help them finally save Arkadia.

Thot: A strange creature that lives in the ancient ruins of a long-destroyed city. He kidnaps Arkana, but without intending to hurt her. He is shot by Spartakus when he tries to protect Arkana, but is only slightly wounded.

Rainbow: Spartakus's younger brother, he grew up in luxury as the adopted son of the Lanista (trainer of gladiators) of Barkar. Unlike his brother, Rainbow is cruel and nihilistic. After the Lanista was overthrown, Rainbow began to wander the nested worlds.

== Home media ==
- The show's popularity in France led to the songs being released on several LPs in the 1980s.
- In France, a set of DVDs was released of the program around 2000.

== Versions ==
The English version aired on the American cable television network Nickelodeon from 1986 to 1987 and in reruns on early Sunday mornings through 1991. In the United Kingdom, Cartoon Network broadcast the series. It also aired on YTV in Canada from around 1988 to 1989. The Menudo closing song was never used for this version. Also in Canada, the original French version aired in Quebec on Télévision Quatre-Saisons in 1986. This version was also aired on the Norwegian TV channel NRK the same year with Norwegian subtitles. The series was broadcast by Network 2 in the Irish Republic. The series was also broadcast on NITV in Australia in 2022.

The show also had the following versions:

- A Hungarian translation (Az elsüllyedt világok, "The Sunken Worlds"). It was originally aired on Magyar Televízió in 1988 (and later re-aired in 1990), and was rebroadcast in 2005 on the children's television channel Minimax.
- A Czech translation (Spartakus a podmořské slunce) of both seasons, with the first season being translated in 2005 and the second season in 2010.
- A Japanese translation (飲み込んだ世界, Nomikonda sekai).
- A Korean translation (잠겨진 세계들, Jamgyeojin segyedeul).
- A Latin American Spanish translation (Espartaco y el Sol Bajo el Mar).
- A European Spanish translation (Los Mundos Sumergidos, reaired as Shagma in 1991).
- A Turkish translation (Kayıp Dünyalar, "Lost Worlds").
- A Greek translation (Σάγκμα, ταξίδι στο κέντρο της γης, "Shagma, journey to the center of the earth").
- A Romanian translation (Spartacus și soarele de dincolo de mări), premiered in 2005 on the Romanian Minimax, simultaneously with the Hungarian re-runs. Until January 2010.
- A Polish translation (Szagma albo zaginione światy, "Shagma or the lost worlds").
- An Italian translation (I mondi sommersi).
- A Zulu/Xhosa translation in 1999

=== Name changes ===
- Since the names of the pirates were all based on puns, these were changed in every version to names that fit the languages to which they were translated.
- The English version had a large number of name changes. Since the word shag found in most of the characters and terms associated with Arkadia (e.g. Shagshag, Shagmir, the Shagma, etc.) has a meaning in British slang of sexual intercourse, new names were invented for these. For similar reasons, the pirate Seskapil's name was changed to Sleazeappeal.
- In the English version, Rebecca's brother Bob was renamed to Matt. The reason behind this change is unknown.
- The MacGuffin magical metal was called orichalcum (orichalque) in the original version, but "auracite" in the English version.
- The songs were translated and re-sung by the voice actors in each version.
- In the U.S. and Latin American versions, a new theme song was featured in the second season. The new song was performed by the boy band Menudo in English for the U.S. version and in Spanish for the Latin American version. For the first season and all episodes of the non-American English releases, the theme was instead a version of the original performed by British band Cook da Books.
- Cypriot singer Anna Vissi performed the theme song of the Greek version.
- When the Hungarian version was rebroadcast on television in 2005, Minimax used the original dub from the archives of Magyar Televízió. As of January 9, 2010, this same channel premiered the second season, dubbed in 2009. While the first season was translated from the original French, the second season uses English titles and source script, which produced certain changes in translations of certain names of characters and concepts from the show.

== Episode list ==
=== Season One (1985–1986) ===
1. "The City of Arkadia" – September 24, 1985
2. "Between Two Worlds" – October 1, 1985
3. "Arkana and the Beast" – October 8, 1985
4. "The Pirate Klub" – October 15, 1985
5. "The Living Crystal" – October 22, 1985
6. "The Law of the Mogokhs" – October 29, 1985
7. "Night of the Amazons" – November 5, 1985
8. "The Capture of Demosthenes" – November 12, 1985
9. "Tada and the Royal Insignia" – November 19, 1985
10. "The Icy Web" – November 26, 1985
11. "The Pirate Convention" – December 3, 1985
12. "Out of Control" – December 10, 1985
13. "Children... and Mice" – December 17, 1985
14. "The Gladiators of Barkar" – December 24, 1985
15. "The Emperor Quin and the Eighth Kingdom" – December 31, 1985
16. "The Dark Hole" – January 7, 1986
17. "The Drummer" – January 14, 1986
18. "Rebecca, Pirate of the Sea" – January 21, 1986
19. "Star Healer" – January 28, 1986
20. "The Prisoners of Lost Time" – February 4, 1986
21. "Emergency Landing" – February 11, 1986
22. "The Court of Miracles" – February 18, 1986
23. "Interstratas War" – February 25, 1986
24. "The Defeat of Gog and Magog" – March 4, 1986
25. "Dr. Test" – March 11, 1986
26. "The Secret of the Auracite" – March 18, 1986

=== Season Two (1986–1987) ===
1. "Prophecy of the Auracite" – October 1, 1986
2. "The Most Dangerous Game" – October 8, 1986
3. "Cyrano" – October 15, 1986
4. "The Tightrope" – October 22, 1986
5. "The Twisted Rainbow" – October 29, 1986
6. "High-Risk Highrise" – November 5, 1986
7. "The Boy Pharaoh" – November 12, 1986
8. "The Floating Casino" – November 19, 1986
9. "Prince Matt" – November 26, 1986
10. "The Land of the Chameleons" – December 3, 1986
11. "The Token of the Manitou" – December 10, 1986
12. "The Master of the Tongues" – December 17, 1986
13. "The Land of the Great Spider" – December 24, 1986
14. "The Ransom of Peace" – December 31, 1986
15. "The Triangle of the Deep" – January 8, 1987
16. "Uncle Albert" – January 15, 1987
17. "Tehrig's Nightmare" – January 22, 1987
18. "Rainbow's End" – January 29, 1987
19. "Holiday Fever" – February 5, 1987
20. "Dodo" – February 12, 1987
21. "The Shadow of Tehra" – February 19, 1987
22. "The Temple of the Condor" – February 26, 1987
23. "Mama Thot" – March 5, 1987
24. "Gateway to Dawn" – March 12, 1987
25. "The Path of Light" – March 19, 1987
26. "The Return of the Prisoners of the Lost Time" – March 26, 1987

== See also ==
- Journey to the Center of the Earth
