= Clémentine =

French animated TV series

Clémentine (pronounced French pronunciation: [klemɑ̃tin]) is a 1985 French animated television series (in co-production with Japan). The series consists of 39 episodes which feature the fantastic adventures of a young girl (Clémentine Dumat) who uses a wheelchair. The show was produced by "IDDH", a company that originally started out producing French-dubbed versions of Japanese anime. It originally aired on Antenne 2 (now France 2) in September 1985. Clémentine was one of three children's animated programs that Antenne 2 had commissioned for their autumn schedule (the other two programs were Bibifoc and Les Mondes engloutis). The series was released on VHS in 1990 and on DVD in 2006.

== Overview ==
Clémentine is the daughter of a famous French pilot and war hero Alex Dumat, who raised her alone with her brother Petit Boy. After she loses the use of her legs in an airplane accident, she travels the world with her family to find a cure that will allow her to walk again. Meanwhile, in her nightly dreams, she can walk and her cat Hélice (French for "propeller") can talk and fly with the help of a helicopter-like apparatus on its head. Clementine leads a battle against the demon Malmoth, with the guidance of her guardian angel Héméra, travelling in a magical blue sphere. Occasionally, in these travels through fantasy and time, she meets famous fictional characters such as Pinocchio, Aladdin and Oliver Twist. She also frequently meets historic characters, especially aviation pioneers such as Charles Lindbergh, and Kateri Tekakwitha.

The series creator, Bruno-René Huchez, based the main plot on his own personal childhood memories. When he was young, he fell very sick and was confined to a bed, and his mother used to tell him all sort of fairy tales to cheer him up. Those events, decades later, would become the basis of the show's main plot.

== Popularity ==
The series is considered as a cult classic in Europe (especially in Turkey, where it seems to be much more popular than it is in its home country France).

Between 1990 and 1995, it was translated to Arabic in Lebanon, as well as English, Chinese, Turkish and Latin-American Spanish. It is also a classic worldwide, as it is quite well known in China and Latin America. The series also has its fans in the Czech Republic, where it was broadcast in 1995 on the television station Premiéra TV.

An English-language dub of Clémentine was broadcast on the satellite broadcaster The Children's Channel in 1992; this version aired in the United Kingdom and the Republic of Ireland.

Clementine is barely remembered in the U.S., where the series was never broadcast as it is, but was converted into 2 compilation films by Celebrity Home Entertainment (under their "Just For Kids" imprint), entitled (without the accent mark):

- "Clementine's Enchanted Journey"
- "Clementine: A Young Girl and Her Dreams"

The majority of the characters' names were changed in the English dub.

== Controversy ==
While being very popular among devoted fans, some question whether the featured tragic flow of events and the scary look of the main villain Malmoth, a demon made of flames, were appropriate for young children. Also, although Malmoth's envoys look like regular humans during their missions on Earth, often trying to kill Clementine, they are cursed men that regularly inhabit a hellish realm where they return after being killed in action. Their true form combines their human heads and faces with the bodies of creatures conventionally regarded as repulsive such as worms, insects and scorpions. In the U.S. compilation films, some scenes were deleted.

In her adventure in Egypt, Clementine ends up marrying Tutankhamun and later has to kill herself in order to travel to the land of the dead. She drinks some poison and is judged by Anubis but goes on without further trouble as she is pure of heart. At the end of the Egyptian saga back at her present time, her father's mechanic friend comes around, saying that Tutankhamun's tomb has been found. Clementine mentions jokingly that someone has finally found her husband's tomb. Everyone laughs upon hearing this when it turns out to be actually true. The date is wrong, however, as Tutankhamun's tomb was found in 1922, not 1925.

== Episode list (in French) ==
=== Season 1 ===
- 01. Le sinistre Mollache
- 02. La fuite en ballon
- 03. L'accident
- 04. La vengeance de Malmoth
- 05. L'opération du diable
- 06. Clémentine en Italie: La fête à Venise
- 07. Clémentine en Italie: La fosse aux murènes
- 08. Clémentine en Allemagne: La maison de gâteau
- 09. Clémentine en Allemagne: Le secret du miroir
- 10. Clémentine en Angleterre: Le bébé sauvé des eaux
- 11. Clémentine en Angleterre: La chasse à l'homme
- 12. Clémentine en Suède: À la recherche de Nils Holgersson
- 13. Clémentine en Suède: Les veuves rouges
- 14. Clémentine en Afrique: Le petit roi de la jungle ou Mohann, l'enfant de la jungle
- 15. Clémentine en Afrique: L'herbe de vie
- 16. Clémentine au pays des Mille et une Nuits: Pour les beaux yeux d'une princesse
- 17. Clémentine au pays des Mille et une Nuits: Clémentine, général de l'armée des sables
- 18. Clémentine au Canada: La cabane des Batifole
- 19. Clémentine au Canada: Les Gorges des Mille-Échos
- 20. Clémentine en Espagne: L'or et la peste
- 21. Clémentine en Espagne: L'armada des Toros
- 22. Clémentine en Égypte: La cité de l'Horizon
- 23. Clémentine en Égypte: Le voyage au pays des morts
- 24. Clémentine au Japon: La voie du Sabre
- 25. Clémentine au Japon: La peur vaincue ou La guérison de Clémentine

=== Season 2 ===
- 26. La guerre des Grouillants
- 27. La drôle de guerre
- 28. La mort au bout du monde
- 29. La ligne
- 30. Le courrier des Amériques
- 31. Ginette as de pique
- 32. Les aviontures du père Tompier
- 33. La fiancée de Malmoth
- 34. Le dragon dans les nuages
- 35. Le fou des steppes
- 36. Le chant d'amour
- 37. Clémentine superstar
- 38. Malmorea
- 39. Le dernier voyage

== Crew ==
Directed by: René Borg and Jean Cubaud.
Story by: Bruno-René Huchez.
Written by: Olivier Massart and Gilles Taurand.

== Live action film ==
In 2006, Turkish screenwriter and producer/director Stare Yıldırım optioned the story rights for a live action film adaption of Clementine. So far names like Johnny Depp and Gary Oldman have been mentioned to be part of the film, but there has not been any official word from them. The screenplay was to be written in English and was planned to target a worldwide audience. Turkish company called Medyavision was reported to finance the film with a targeted budget of $80-$100 million (U.S. dollars). No further updates were provided about the project and its status is unknown.

== See also ==
- List of French animated television series
- List of French television series
