= Club Dorothée =

French children's television program

- Network: TF1
- Launched: September 2, 1987
- Closed: August 30, 1997
- Country of origin: France
- Format: Defunct children's block
- Running time: 60 minutes (weekday); 120 minutes (Wednesday)
- Original language: French

Club Dorothée, often shortened to Club Do, was a French children's programme broadcast by TF1 from 1997 and produced by AB Production. It consisted of a team of five presenters (Dorothée, Jacky, Ariane Carletti, François Corbier and Patrick Simpson-Jones), as well as cartoonist Lionel Gédébé during season 1 (1987-1988), the voice of Monsieur Cadeau (Olivier Martial Thieffin) from season 5 (1992-1997) and Éric Galliano for the final season (1996-1997).

Based on Récré A2 and inheriting most of its staff, its focal point was Dorothée, its main presenter, enabling it to promote her songs, albums and shows. It also contained cartoons, TV series, sitcoms, games, competitions and educational segments.

During its ten years on air, it was marked for its record high ratings and was also subject to numerous controversies.

== Early years and popularity ==
TF1 was privatised in April 1987; at the time, one of its competitors was Récré A2, created in 1978, which rose to prominence because of Dorothée, who subsequently met with Jean-Luc Azoulay and Claude Berda to form AB Production. In order to increase its penetration among the children's market, Francis Bouygues suggested the creation of a new programme, Club Dorothée, as well as her know-how and team from the Antenne 2 days.

Initially, it had three names: the Wednesday morning edition was named Dorothée Matin, the one on Wednesday afternoon, Club Dorothée and the one on Sunday, Dorothée Dimanche. Beginning September 1988, all editions were renamed Club Dorothée; from this period, the afternoon programme aired on all weekdays.

Its beginning was hard, it faced stiff competition from the apex of Recré A2 and La Cinq via Silvio Berlusconi had acquired pan-European rights to international cartoons, and aired them in France on Youpi! L'école est finie, which posed a massive challenge to the production team; their efforts had paid off by December 1987, where it had a 13% share, compared to A2's 6% share in the same timeslot. It was also similar in structure to A2's programme, as it featured a cartoonist (Gébédé), a sports segment, mainly catering children with disabilities, but also had music. Over its early years, the channel increased Dorothée's airtime to an extent where it occupied close to thirty hours a week, of which a total of eight hours were spent on Wednesdays alone, from 8:55am to 6pm.

Singer Carlos was selected a posteriori to become its godfather but he was not invited until October 1987, and appeared nearly every year during its ten years on air, and was absent in its final season.

In its early years, the cartoons came solely from whatever TF1 had in stock: Jem, Jayce and the Wheeled Warriors, Care Bears and The Littles, as well as Candy Candy, Goldorak (Récré A2) and Bioman (Cabou Cadin) from the IDDH catalog, the latter of which were acquired by AB Productions in full. During the first trimester on air, AB acquired a substantial amount of foreign cartoons, almost entirely Japanese, to air from the second quarter of 1988. These included Dragon Ball, Dragon Ball Z, Maison Ikkoku, Saint Seiya, Ranma ½, Moero! Top Striker, Georgie!, City Hunter (1987 TV series) and even Sailor Moon.

=== Youpi ! L'école est finie and Club Do' ===
During the TF1-La Cinq war, where Berlusconi sold his network in France in early 1991, he also sells the rights of all of the cartoons on Youpi ! L'école est finie to its arch-rival AB Productions. AB played on two tables: in order to neutralize the fifth network, AB partly aired Robotech in April 1991 during Club Dorothée. In this process, AB also aired Princess Sara, Captain Tsubasa, Little Lord Fauntleroy, Kimagure Orange☆Road and Love Me, My Knight, etc. At the same time, AB through its Animage subsidiary acquires Berlusconi's catalogue and resold one part to La Cinq

== Criticism and controversies ==
The first series to cause concern was Fist of the North Star, a post-apocalyptic anime, over violent scenes with blood, causing anger from family associations. Under pressure from these associations and from CSA (now ARCOM), a group of psycologists was hired by AB Productions to adapt the series to western youth norms and introducing psychological cuts and adaptations to make it kid-friendly. These changes altered the episodes, removed the series from its original undertons and certain episodes even lost a few minutes in length.

In 1990, CSA intervened to TF1 regarding Kinnikuman as one of the characters presented a symbol which was believed to be Nazi. The channel thus removed the series. The neologism japoniaiserie was born ouf ot these controversies, and was later used by Télérama. Libération also used the term to refer to "heavy violent" shows".

In July 1996, Les Pieds dans le PAF criticised a scene in Dragon Ball Z showing "the absorption of a cyborg", which the group thought to be "the most sadistic scene seen in a children's programme". The anime was removed in November 1996.

Aside from criticism to the Japanese series, the release of these cartoons was also criticised. There were reports of nearly-systematic censors in cartoons, dubs of a low quality, "savage" removals of shows and even untimely commercial breaks, creating a sort of mix between Japanese animes and the show's editorial content.</ref> créant de fait un amalgame entre la série animée japonaise et le contenu éditorial de l'émission.

== French quotas ==
The 1990 law imposed a reduction in the airtime of Japanese cartoons and incentivised more French production, causing AB Production to produce its own content, largely sitcoms From 1991, it invested in cartoon production, with Sophie et Virginie, Les Jumeaux du bout tu monde and Les Misérables, as well as international co-productions such as and Le maître des bots.

=== Downfall ===
Signs of decay emerged in early 1995, when TF1 ordered Dominique Poussier to produce a document for the post-Dorothée phase. The weekday morning edition ended in favour of À tout Spip. In May, AB launched AB Sat and competed with TF1's TPS, which no longer wanted to work internally with AB, thus making it a new competitor. Over time, TF1 began to reduce its airtime, especially the Wednesday afternoon show which fell from three hours to just forty minutes. TF1 still had a contract with Dorothée until August 1997; the network subsequently started using every possible tactic to reduce its airtime further. From September to December 1996, it was retooled to match the internet phenomenon and was renamed Cyber Club Dorothée, but was a ratings failure. The successful anime series, which were in constant reruns (Saint Seiya and Dragon Ball Z) did not adapt to the new format.

In January 1997, its airtime was reduced further, only seen on Wednesday mornings and early Saturday mornings. In March, TF1 announced that it would not renew its contract with AB and that Club Dorothée would end from 30 August. The final edition was pre-recorded on 26 August and broadcast on 29 August. TF1 rejected the final to air live, which went against Dorothée's wish to end it live. The edition ended at 11:02am, to the tune of Un jour on se retrouvera. The real final programme was broadcast on 30 August, and consisted solely of three episodes from the AB sitcom Pas de Pitié pour Les Croissants and highlights of the de facto final broadcast the previous day.
