= Dorothée =

French singer and TV presenter (born 1953)

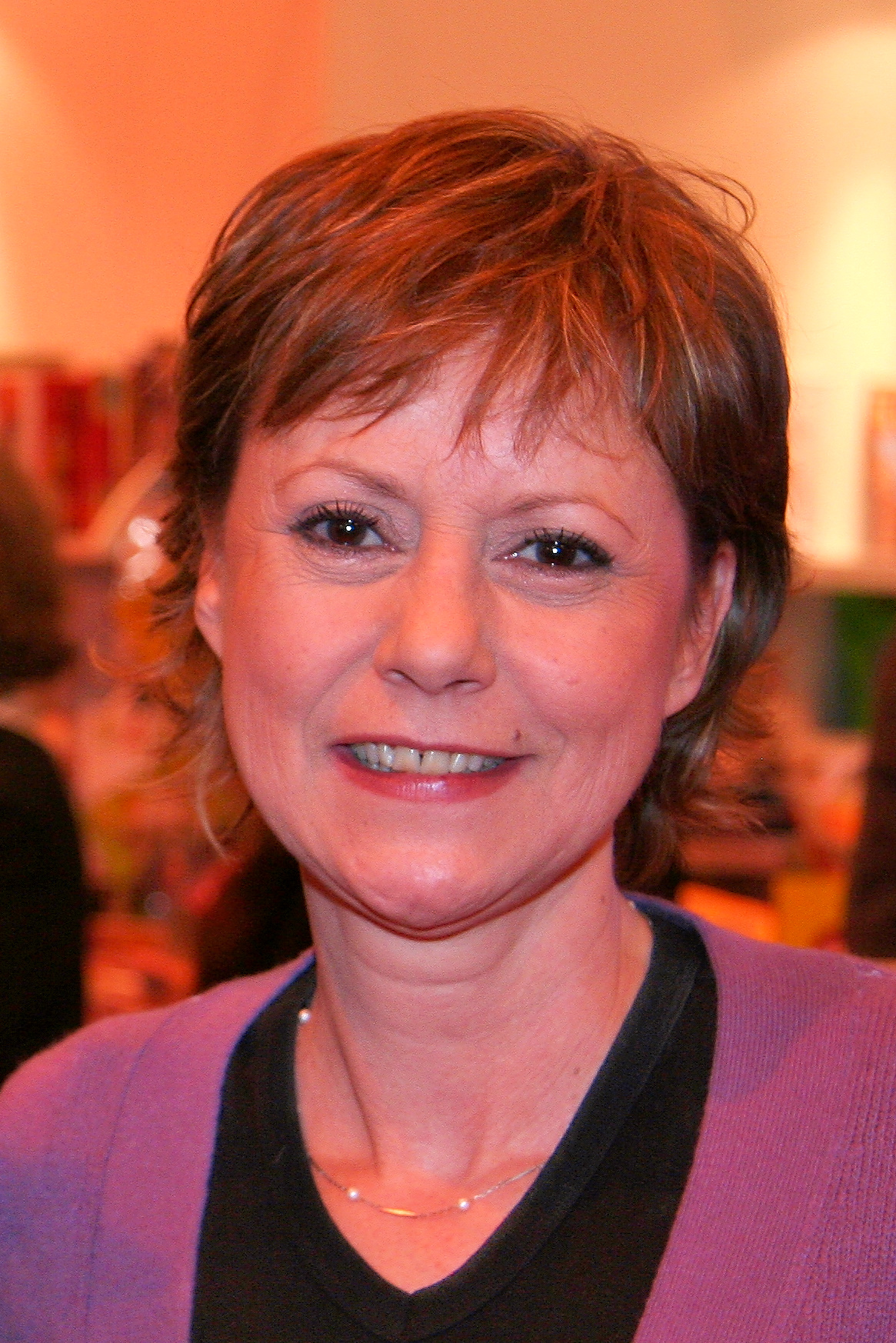
- Dorothée in 2008

Background information
- Born: Frédérique Hoschedé; 14 July 1953 (age 73); Paris, France
- Genres: French pop, children's music
- Occupations: Singer, television presenter
- Instruments: Vocals, guitar
- Years active: 1973–2010
- Label: AB Disques
- Website: dorothee-officiel.com

Frédérique Hoschedé (born 14 July 1953), better known by the stage name Dorothée, is a French singer and television presenter. She was a continuity announcer on French public broadcaster Antenne 2 from 1977 to 1983, but she is best known for having presented children's television shows like Les mercredis de la jeunesse (1973), Dorothée et ses amis (1977–1978), {{langRécré A2}} (1978–1987), and especially Club Dorothée (1987–1997), which totalled up to about thirty hours of broadcast per week and popularized anime in France (with titles like Dragon Ball, Saint Seiya, City Hunter, or Hokuto no Ken sparking controversy and complaints from the CSA as well as some political figures, for their violent content).

Dorothée is a singer with a large discography (one album per year on average between 1980 and 1996), singing pop music for children, and she has recorded well-known French traditional nursery rhymes in a record collection called Le jardin des chansons. Several of her songs were used for the openings of animated series featured in Club Dorothée (including "Candy" and "Sophie et Virginie"). One of her trademarks is that each of her albums, from Hou ! la menteuse in 1982 to Dorothée 2010, featured a song with the word "valise" (suitcase) in its title, with a similar melody but a different arrangement and partially updated lyrics, totalling sixteen "valise" songs.

Between 1990 and 1996, Dorothée performed 56 shows at the Palais Omnisports de Paris-Bercy (now called AccorHotels Arena), still the record for a female artist and the third-highest total number of concerts in this venue behind Michel Sardou and Johnny Hallyday. In addition, her 1992 tour attracted more people in France than Johnny Hallyday and Michael Jackson, earning her a "Fauteuil d'Or" award for more than 500,000 tickets sold.

Later in her musical career, Dorothée developed a particular interest in early rock music. In 1993 and 1994, she presented three special prime time shows called Dorothée Rock'n'roll Show, in which she sang duets with major rock and roll and rhythm and blues artists, including Ray Charles, Chuck Berry, Cliff Richard, Henri Salvador, Percy Sledge, Screamin' Jay Hawkins, and Jerry Lee Lewis, with whom she sang "Great Balls of Fire", which also featured on her album Une histoire d'amour (1992). Her 1994 album, Nashville Tennessee, was recorded in the titular city of Nashville, in the recording studio made famous by Elvis Presley and Bill Haley.

Dorothée had a brief stint in cinema, appearing in three movies between 1979 and 1980, including a prominent role in L'amour en fuite by François Truffaut. She also made a cameo appearance in the 2019 live action Nicky Larson movie.

== Discography ==
=== Albums ===
- 1980 : Dorothée au pays des chansons
- 1981 : Dorothée & les récré amis chantent
- 1981 : Candy raconte à Dorothée
- 1982 : Hou ! la menteuse
- 1983 : Pour faire une chanson
- 1983 : Les Schtroumpfs
- 1984 : Qu'il est bête! (certified Gold)
- 1984 : Schtroumpfs parade
- 1985 : Allô Allô M. l'Ordinateur (certified Gold)
- 1986 : Maman (certified Gold)
- 1987 : Docteur
- 1988 : Attention Danger (certified Platinum)
- 1989 : Tremblement de terre (2x certified Gold)
- 1990 : Live à Bercy
- 1990 : Chagrin d'amour (certified Gold)
- 1991 : Les neiges de l'Himalaya
- 1992 : Une histoire d'amour
- 1993 : Bercy 93
- 1993 : 2394
- 1994 : Nashville Tennessee
- 1995 : Bonheur City
- 1996 : La Honte de la famille
- 2010 : Dorothée 2010

=== Compilations ===
- 1980 : Les feuilletons de Récré A2
- 1982 : Les feuilletons de Récré A2 (2nd edition)
- 1988 : Les super chansons
- 1990 : Top Dorothée
- 1994 : Cristal
- 1997 : 15 ans d'amour
- 1998 : Le jardin des chansons
- 2004 : Les plus belles chansons (2nd edition of 15 ans d'amour)
- 2006 : Dorothée BERCY
- 2016 : Dorothée : L'essentiel (Best of + 7 unreleased songs)
- 2023 : Dorothée le coffret anniversaire (100 tracks + several unreleased songs)

=== Main singles ===
- 1980 : "Musique magique"
- 1981 : "Tchou ! Tchou ! Le petit train"
- 1981 : "Rox & Rouky"
- 1982 : "Enfin récré A2 !"
- 1982 : "Hou la menteuse / La valise" (SNEP: Silver)
- 1983 : "Pour faire une chanson"
- 1983 : "Les Schtroumpfs" (certified Platinum)
- 1984 : "Qu'il est bête !"
- 1984 : "Les petits Ewoks"
- 1985 : "Vive les vacances"
- 1985 : "Allô Allô M. l'Ordinateur" (SNEP: Silver)
- 1986 : "Tant qu'on a des amis"
- 1986 : "Maman" (SNEP: Silver)
- 1987 : "Où se cache l'amour"
- 1987 : "Le sourire du dragon" (French opening theme of Dungeons & Dragons)
- 1987 : "La chanson des Ewoks"
- 1987 : "Docteur"
- 1988 : "La chanson de Candy"
- 1988 : "Attention danger"
- 1989 : "La machine avalé"
- 1989 : "Tremblement de terre"
- 1990 : "Nicolas & Marjolaine"
- 1990 : "Chagrin d'amour"
- 1991 : "Un jour on se retrouvera"
- 1991 : "Valise Ninety One"
- 1991 : "Les neiges de l'Himalaya"
- 1992 : "Le collège des cœurs brisés"
- 1992 : "Où est le garçon"
- 1992 : "Une histoire d'amour"
- 1993 : "Toutes les guitares du rock'n'roll"
- 1993 : "Bats-toi"
- 1993 : "Il faut chanter"
- 1993 : "2394"
- 1994 : "Si j'ai menti"
- 1994 : "Chanson pour un garçon"
- 1994 : "Non non-ne dis pas"
- 1995 : "Folle de vous"
- 1995 : "Des millions de copains"
- 1995 : "Bonheur City"
- 1996 : "Je rêve"
- 1996 : "La honte de la famille"
- 1997 : "Toutes les chansons du monde"
- 2006 : "Hou la menteuse remix" (certified Silver)
- 2006 : "La valise remix"
- 2006 : "Allô, allô M. l'Ordinateur remix"
- 2010 : "Coup de tonnerre"
- 2010 : "À l'Olympia"
- 2025 : "J'ai dans mes souvenirs"

=== Greatest hits ===
| Year | Title | Notes |
|---|---|---|
| 1980 | "Une fille qu'est-ce que c'est?" | |
| 1980 | "Musique magique" | |
| 1980 | "Récré A2 amusons-nous" | Theme for the program Récré A2 |
| 1981 | "Qu'elle est loin ton Amérique Candy" | |
| 1981 | "Tchou ! Tchou ! Le petit train" | |
| 1981 | "Rox & Rouky" | French theme for The Fox and the Hound |
| 1982 | "Enfin Récré A2!" | Theme for the TV show of the same name |
| 1982 | "Hou ! la menteuse !" | |
| 1982 | "La valise" | |
| 1983 | "Au royaume de Diguedondaine" | |
| 1983 | "Pour faire une chanson" | |
| 1983 | "Les Schtroumpfs" | Theme for The Smurfs |
| 1983 | "Bonjour Dorothée" | |
| 1984 | "Schtroumpfs La La" | Soundtrack for the Hanna-Barbera movie Vl'à les Schtroumpfs |
| 1984 | "Qu'il est bête !" | |
| 1984 | "Les petits Ewoks" | Theme for Caravan of Courage: An Ewok Adventure |
| 1985 | "Vive les vacances" | |
| 1985 | "Allô, Allô, M. l'Ordinateur" | |
| 1986 | "Tant qu'on a des amis" | |
| 1986 | "Maman" | |
| 1987 | "Où se cache l'amour" | |
| 1987 | "Donjons et dragons" | French theme for Dungeons & Dragons |
| 1987 | "La chanson des Ewoks" | New theme for Caravan of Courage: An Ewok Adventure |
| 1987 | "Docteur" | |
| 1987 | "La chanson de Candy" | |
| 1988 | "Attention danger" | |
| 1989 | "La machine avalé" | |
| 1989 | "Tremblement de terre" | |
| 1990 | "Nicolas & Marjolaine" | |
| 1990 | "Chagrin d'amour" | |
| 1991 | "Un jour on se retrouvera" | |
| 1991 | "Valise Ninety-One" | |
| 1991 | "Les neiges de l'Himalaya" | |
| 1992 | "Le collège des cœurs brisés" | |
| 1992 | "Où est le garçon ?" | |
| 1992 | "Une histoire d'amour" | |
| 1993 | "Toutes les guitares du rock'n'roll" | |
| 1993 | "Bats-toi" | |
| 1993 | "Il faut chanter" | |
| 1993 | "2394" | |
| 1994 | "Si j'ai menti" | |
| 1994 | "Chanson pour un garçon" | |
| 1994 | "Non, non, ne dis pas" | |
| 1995 | "Folle de vous" | |
| 1995 | "Des millions de copains" | |
| 1995 | "Bonheur City" | |
| 1996 | "Je rêve" | |
| 1996 | "La honte de la famille" | |
| 1997 | "Toutes les chansons du monde" | |
| 2006 | "Hou ! la menteuse ! (Remix)" | |
| 2006 | "La valise (Remix)" | |
| 2006 | "Allô, Allô monsieur l'Ordinateur (Remix)" | |
| 2010 | "Dorothée" | |
| 2010 | "Les chansons du passé" | |
| 2010 | "Coup de tonnerre" | |
| 2025 | "J'ai dans mes souvenirs" | |

== Film ==
- 1979: L'Amour en fuite by François Truffaut: Sabine Barnerias
- 1979: La Gueule de l'autre by Pierre Tchernia: television announcer
- 1980: Pile ou Face by Robert Enrico: Laurence Bertil
- 2019: Nicky Larson et le Parfum de Cupidon by Philippe Lacheau: cameo
- 2023: Transformers: Rise of the Beasts: Airazor (voice, French dub)

== Bibliography ==
- Abécé; Arnaud Babion-Collet (24 April 2008). Dorothée, Merci pour la récré !. Éditions de la Lagune. ISBN 978-2-84969-108-3.
- Pessis, Jacques; Dorothée (5 October 2007). Les années Dorothée. Editions Chronique. ISBN 978-2-205-05934-2.
