= 26th César Awards =

2001 French film awards ceremony

- Date: 24 February 2001
- Site: Théâtre des Champs-Élysées, Paris, France
- Hosted by: Édouard Baer

Highlights
- Best Film: The Taste of Others
- Best Actor: Sergi López
- Best Actress: Dominique Blanc

Television coverage
- Network: Canal+

The 26th César Awards ceremony, presented by the Académie des Arts et Techniques du Cinéma, honoured the best films of 2000 in France and took place on 24 February 2001 at the Théâtre des Champs-Élysées in Paris. The ceremony was chaired by Daniel Auteuil and hosted by Édouard Baer. The Taste of Others won the award for Best Film.

== Winners and nominees ==
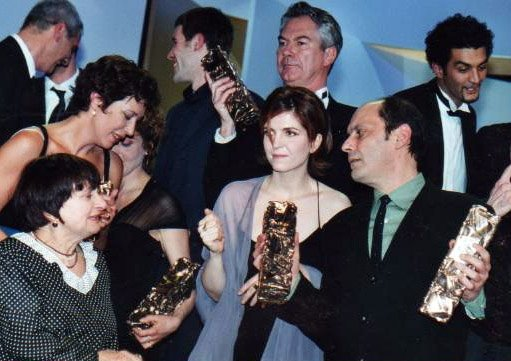
Honorary César recipient Agnès Varda (bottom left) with Agnès Jaoui (centre) and Jean-Pierre Bacri (right), winners for the Best Original Screenplay or Adaptation award

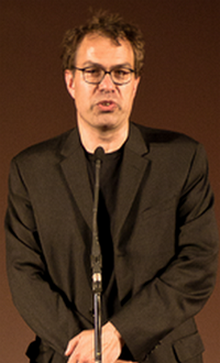
Dominik Moll, Best Director winner

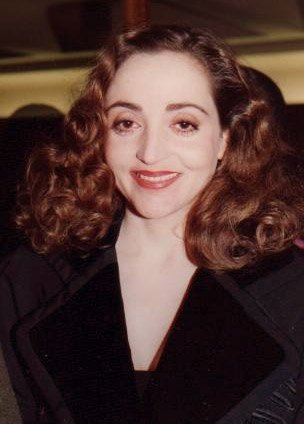
Dominique Blanc, Best Actress winner

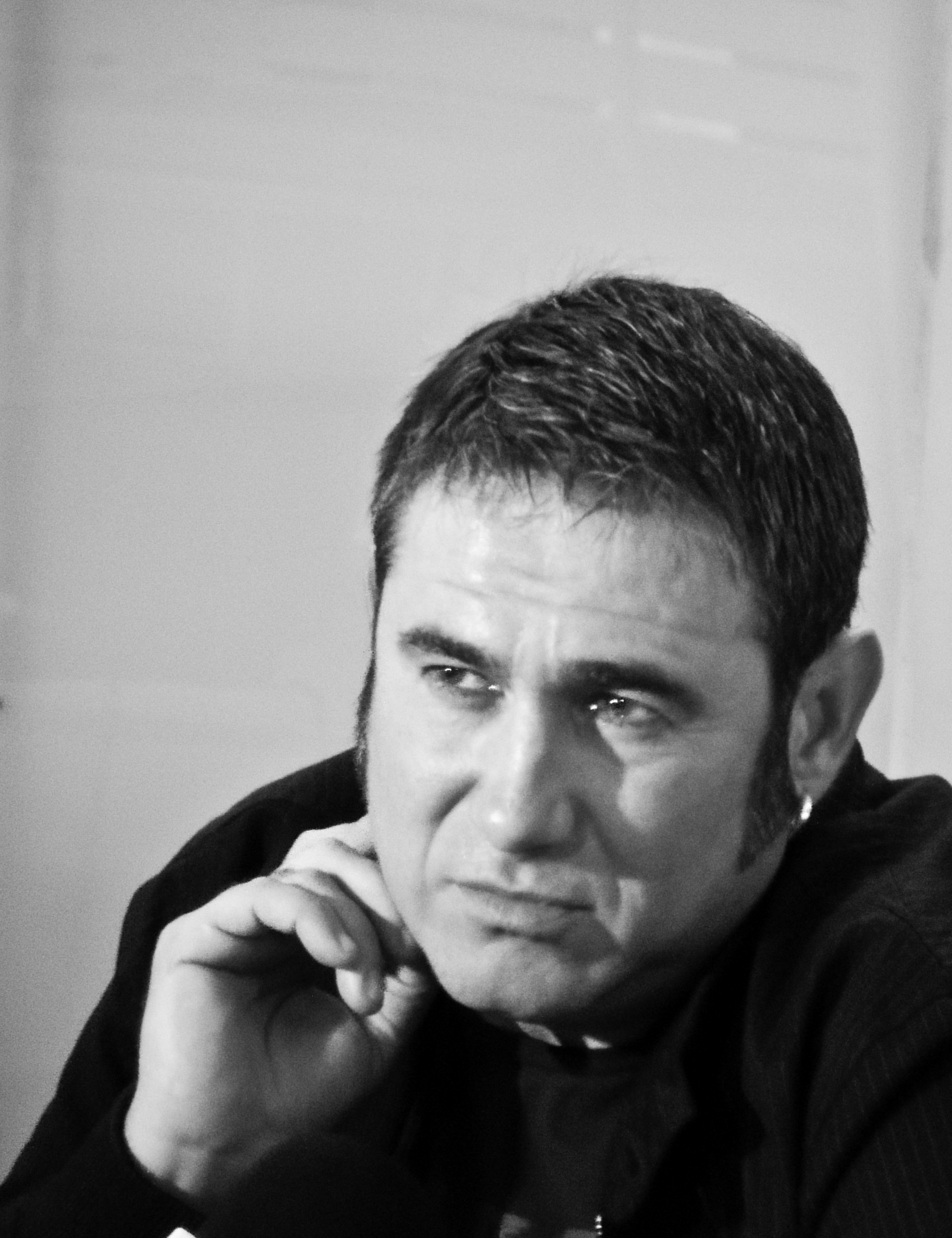
Sergi López, Best Actor winner

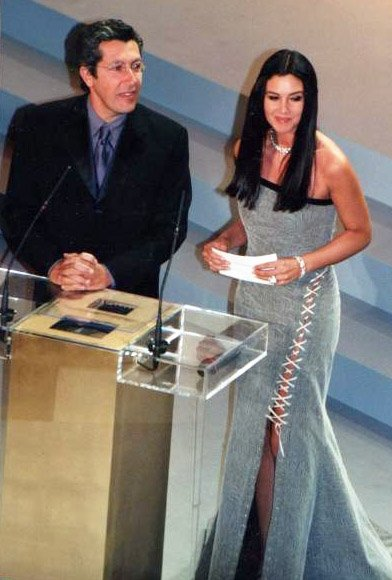
Award presenters Alain Chabat and Monica Bellucci

Best Film The Taste of Others: Harry, He's Here to Help; Murderous Maids; A Question of Taste; The King's Daughters	Best Director Dominik Moll – Harry, He's Here to Help: Jean-Pierre Denis – Murderous Maids; Agnès Jaoui – The Taste of Others; Mathieu Kassovitz – The Crimson Rivers; Patricia Mazuy – The King's Daughters
Best Actor Sergi López – Harry, He's Here to Help: Jean-Pierre Bacri – The Taste of Others; Charles Berling – Sentimental Destinies; Bernard Giraudeau – A Question of Taste; Pascal Greggory – Confusion of Genders	Best Actress Dominique Blanc – Stand-by: Emmanuelle Béart – Sentimental Destinies; Muriel Robin – Marie-Line; Isabelle Huppert – The King's Daughters; Juliette Binoche – The Widow of Saint-Pierre
Best Supporting Actor Gérard Lanvin – The Taste of Others: Alain Chabat – The Taste of Others; Jean-Pierre Kalfon – The King's Daughters; Emir Kusturica – The Widow of Saint-Pierre; Lambert Wilson – Jet Set	Best Supporting Actress Anne Alvaro – The Taste of Others: Jeanne Balibar – Tomorrow's Another Day; Agnès Jaoui – The Taste of Others; Mathilde Seigner – Harry, He's Here to Help; Florence Thomassin – A Question of Taste
Most Promising Actor Jalil Lespert – Human Resources: Jean-Pierre Lorit – A Question of Taste; Boris Terral – The King Is Dancing; Cyrille Thouvenin – Confusion of Genders; Malik Zidi – Water Drops on Burning Rocks	Most Promising Actress Sylvie Testud – Murderous Maids: Bérénice Bejo – Most Promising Young Actress; Sophie Guillemin – Harry, He's Here to Help; Isild Le Besco – Sade; Julie-Marie Parmentier – Murderous Maids
Best Original Screenplay or Adaptation The Taste of Others – Jean-Pierre Bacri and Agnès Jaoui: Harry, He's Here to Help – Gilles Marchand and Dominik Moll; Human Resources – Laurent Cantet and Gilles Marchand; A Question of Taste – Gilles Taurand and Bernard Rapp; The King's Daughters – Patricia Mazuy and Yves Thomas	Best First Feature Film Human Resources: Nationale 7; Crime Scenes; The Squale; Stand-by
Best Cinematography Agnès Godard – Beau Travail: Thierry Arbogast – The Crimson Rivers; Eric Gautier – Sentimental Destinies	Best Editing Yannick Kergoat – Harry, He's Here to Help: Hervé de Luze – The Taste of Others; Maryline Monthieux – The Crimson Rivers
Best Sound François Maurel, Gérard Lamps and Gérard Hardy – Harry, He's Here to Help: Vincent Tulli and Cyril Holtz – The Crimson Rivers; Henri Morelle and Dominique Dalmasso – The King Is Dancing	Best Original Music Tomatito, Sheikh Ahmad Al Tuni, La Caita and Tony Gatlif – Vengo: David Whitaker – Harry, He's Here to Help; Bruno Coulais – The Crimson Rivers; John Cale – The King's Daughters
Best Costume Design Édith Vesperini and Jean-Daniel Vuillermoz – The King's Daughters: Olivier Bériot – The King Is Dancing; Yvonne Sassinot de Nesle – Vatel	Best Production Design Jean Rabasse – Vatel: Katia Wyszkop – Sentimental Destinies; Thierry François – The King's Daughters
Best Short Film (Tie) Salam & Un petit air de fête: Au bout du monde; Le Puits	Best Foreign Film In the Mood for Love: American Beauty; Billy Elliot; Dancer in the Dark; Yi Yi
Honorary César Darry Cowl; Charlotte Rampling; Agnès Varda

== See also ==
- 73rd Academy Awards
- 54th British Academy Film Awards
- 13th European Film Awards
- 6th Lumière Awards
