= List of newsreaders and journalists in France =

Here is a list of French newsreaders and journalists:

== A–D ==
- Paul Amar
- Adolphe Amouroux
- Rachid Arhab
- Marie-Laure Augry
- Francois Bachy
- Philippe Baqué
- Dominique Baudis
- Jacqueline Baudrier
- Daniel Bilalian
- Jacqueline Caurat
- Arlette Chabot
- Robert Chapatte
- Claire Chazal
- Michèle Cotta
- Solange d'Ayen
- Georges de Caunes
- Ladislas de Hoyos
- Laurent Delahousse
- Michel Denisot
- Camille Desmoulins
- Clotilde Dissard
- Camille Drevet
- Michel Droit
- Marie Drucker
- Benoît Duquesne
- Guillaume Durand

== E-L ==
- Jean-Pierre Elkabbach
- Louise Faure-Favier
- Laurence Ferrari
- Carole Gaessler
- Roger Gicquel
- Gérard Holtz
- Christophe Hondelatte
- Thomas Hugues
- Françoise Laborde
- Philippe Labro
- Anne-Sophie Lapix
- Yvette Lebas-Guyot
- Renée Lafont
- William Leymergie
- Élise Lucet

== M–P ==
- Noël Mamère
- Bruno Masure
- Yves Mourousi
- Natalie Nougayrède
- Christine Ockrent
- Jean-Pierre Pernaut
- Gabrielle Petit (feminist)
- Patrick Poivre d'Arvor
- David Pujadas
- Audrey Pulvar

== Q–Z ==
- Bernard Rapp
- Colette Reynaud
- Thierry Roland
- Laurent Romejko
- Harry Roselmack
- Jacques Rivette
- Pierre Sabbagh
- Henri Sannier
- Béatrice Schönberg
- Pierre Tchernia, a.k.a. Pierre Tcherniakowski
- Mélissa Theuriau
- Jean-Pierre Thiollet
- Guy Thomas
- Elisabeth Vincentelli
- Karl Zéro
- Léon Zitrone
