= Roger Gicquel =

French journalist (1933–2010)

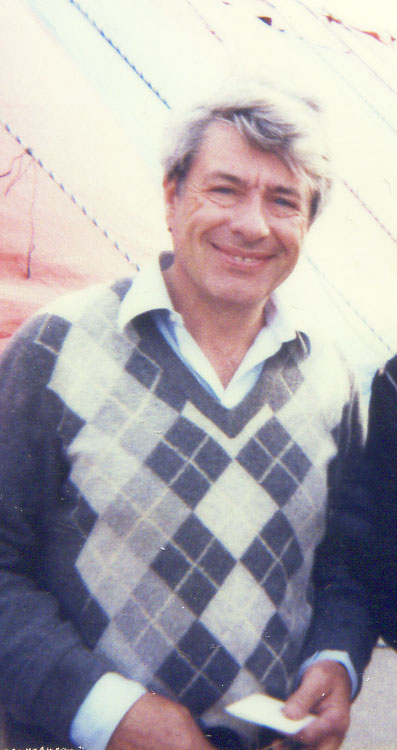
- Roger Gicquel (1983)
- Born: 22 February 1933; Thiers-sur-Thève, France
- Died: 6 March 2010 (aged 77); Plouër-sur-Rance, France
- Occupation: Television journalist
- Employer: TF1
- Known for: Presenter of Le journal de 20 heures
- Successor: Jean-Claude Narcy
- Awards: Chevalier of the National Order of Merit

Roger Gicquel (22 February 1933 in Thiers-sur-Thève in the Oise department – 6 March 2010 in Plouër-sur-Rance in the Côtes-d'Armor) was a French journalist. He presented the 20 hour Journal on the TV channel TF1 from 1975 to 1981.

== Biography ==
During the 1950s, Gicquel began a career in acting. He was also a flight attendant on the airline UAT from 1953 to 1960 before moving into journalism.

He started at the Parisien libéré in Seine-et-Marne in 1961. He started work at the Coulommiers office. On 8 December 1962, he married at Boissy-le-Châtel on the road to Coulommiers. Roger Gicquel sent his reports from his Citroën 2CV. He regularly socialised with his colleagues in the local press from the Freedom of Seine-et-Marne and Country Briard newspapers whom he met at "The Modern" Inn in Saint-Cyr-sur-Morin. Then the newspaper asked him to create the Normandy Morning as a local edition of the Parisien for the Upper Normandy region. He also wrote for other local publications in Elbeuf and Les Andelys, as well as in those of Évreux, Louviers, and Vernon.

In 1971, he left Normandy Morning to become a consultant for two years for the information service at UNICEF. Then he served as chief information officer for ORTF.

Encouraged to move to radio by Roland Dhordain, founder of France Inter, Roger Gicquel joined the station and created a press review that he presented from 1968 to 1973. He also became chief reporter in 1969.

In 1975, he became the news presenter on the 20 hours Journal at TF1 despite his lack of television experience. In competition with France 2 TF1 asked him to "Personalise the Information to better differentiate ourselves and retain the loyalty of the public". Each evening, Roger Gicquel began his report by an editorial in which he gave his opinion. This personalisation, which subsequently appeared outdated, was the trademark of Roger Gicquel's appearances on television, watched nightly by millions of French people. Inspired by the TV journalist Walter Cronkite, the news presenter at the American channel CBS News, He claimed his independence from political influence and his freedom of speech: "I maintained that the audience should be able to watch the journal and hear of a tidal wave in the Ganges delta even without images rather than see the birth of a calf in an aquatic zoo in Tokyo". Ladislas de Hoyos, the star presenter of the weekly journal on TF1 from 1990 to 1991, also followed the same approach.

He was particularly famous for his opening sentence on the 20 hour Journal on 18 February 1976:

"France in fear".

This underlined the emotion caused by the kidnapping and death of a small boy Philippe Bertrand at Troyes by Patrick Henry. This saying was diluted, however, because a few minutes later, he clarified that this fear is a feeling which we must not give up.

Leaving the presentation of television news in 1981, Roger Gicquel then held several positions at TF1. He directed and produced major news stories and documentaries, all while maintaining a chronicle on Europe 1 until 1982. He returned to TF1 at the beginning of 1983, for the presentation and production of the show Vagabondages in which he mainly hosted notable people from the cultural world. He left TF1 again in 1986 when it was privatised. From 1987 to 1994, he returned to France Inter with a Weekend Press Review.

In 1994, he made his return to television at the request of Jean-Pol Guguen, director of the regional station France 3 Ouest, where he hosted and produced every Saturday Strolling. In total, 182 issues were made of this program, with the participation of 1,200 witnesses were broadcast so that people could discover not only splendours and curiosities, but also the ugliness (pollution, urbanism) of places often ignored in the west of France, at Vendée.

Gicquel died in Plouër-sur-Rance near Saint-Malo in Côtes-d'Armor on 6 March 2010 at the age of 77 years as a result of a heart attack. He is buried in the same city.

== Personal life and commitments ==
Gicquel was the son of shopkeepers. His father was from the Brittany region which is where young Roger grew up. As a teenager he dreamed of becoming a writer.

In 1997, Gicquel chose to settle in Rance in the Côtes-d'Armor. Returning to Brittany after his career as a journalist, producer and presenter, he wrote books in which his passion for this region shone through.

From September 1999 to January 2003, he was the author of a monthly column in Le Peuple Breton, a journal of opinion published by the Breton Democratic Union (UDB). Throughout the 2000s, he campaigned alongside the UDB and the French Greens. He a member of a number of associations especially the Water and Rivers Association of Brittany, which fights against green algae among other things.

== Honours ==
Gicquel was a chevalier (knight) of the Ordre national du Mérite (National Order of Merit).

== Bibliography ==
- Violence and fear, France-Empire, 1977, 255 p.
- Curves and men, France-Empire, 1981, 255 p.
- Roger Gicquel and Jean-Paul Renvoize, Highway Drivers, Paris, Michel Vincent, et al. "Contemporaries", 1984, 77 p. (ISBN 978-2-7048-0015-5) (OCLC 461759593)
- The closet of dreams, Paris, Plon, 1988, 304 p. (ISBN 978-2-259-01912-5)
- How to tell?: Poems and Songs, Paris, Le Cherche midi, et al. "singular voice", 1990, 83 p. (ISBN 978-2-86274-173-4)
- Roger Gicquel and Valery Hache, Sein: The Eternal Resistance fighter, Apogee, 1998, 95 p. (ISBN 978-2-84398-006-0)
- Roger Gicquel and Philippe Gallouedec, All roads lead to Brittany, Paris, Ramsay, 1998, 326 p. (ISBN 978-2-84114-254-5) (LCCN 2001325705)
- Roger Gicquel and Daniel Le Danvic, The Silent Boats, The Common Share, 2001, 78 p. (ISBN 978-2-84418-017-9)
- Roger Gicquel, Max Aufret and Emmanuel Berthier, La Rance: Rivers and Islands, Ship holds and Ports, Rennes, France West Publishing, coll. "Route Discovery", 2003, 127 p. (ISBN 978-2-7373-2771 -1) (OCLC 469930657)
- Roger Gicquel and Patrick Beroul, The Emerald Coast, Editions Ouest-France, et al. "rare books", 2003, 88 p. (ISBN 978-2-7373-3170-1)
- Returned: a collection of poems, Morlaix, Skol Vreizh, 2006, pocket, 88 p. (ISBN 978-2-915623-29-1)
- Roger Gicquel and Jean-Roger Morel, Cruises and Ports in Brittany, Rennes, France West Publishing, coll. "rare books", 2006, 92 p. (ISBN 978-2-7373-4090-1) (OCLC 470570168)
- Roger Gicquel, Raphaëla Le Gouvello, Philippe Huet and Daniel Kempa, Brittany, Arles, Actes Sud, et al. "Conservatoire du Littoral", 2008, 301 p. (ISBN 978-2-7427-7625-2)

== Discography ==
I wanted so much, 45 rpm, EMI, 1981.

== Filmography ==
=== Cinema ===
- 1995 : Happiness Is in the Field, by Étienne Chatiliez: Charles
- 1997 : Survey of Viewers (Short Film)
