= Allagnon =

Allagnon may refer to:

- Alagnon, French river
- Stéphane Allagnon, French director
