= The Frozen Dead (TV series) =

- Also known as: Glacé
- Genre: Mystery; Crime drama; Thriller
- Created by: Gerard Carre; Caroline Van Ruymbeke; Pascal Chaumeil
- Based on: Glacé by Bernard Minier
- Written by: Gerard Carre; Caroline Van Ruymbeke; Pascal Chaumeil
- Directed by: Laurent Herbiet
- Starring: Charles Berling; Julia Piaton; Pascal Greggory; Nina Meurisse; Lubna Azabal; Anne Le Ny; Robinson Stévenin; Robert Plagnol; Sophie Guillemin
- Opening theme: "Hurt"
- Composer: Alexandre Lessertisseur
- Country of origin: France
- Original language: French
- No. of seasons: 1
- No. of episodes: 6

Production
- Executive producers: Sidonie Dumas; Christophe Riandee
- Producers: Isabelle Degeorges; Damien Couvreur
- Running time: 52 minutes
- Production companies: Gaumont Télévision; Métropole Télévision

Original release
- Network: M6
- Release: 10 January – 24 January 2017

The Frozen Dead (French: Glacé) is a French mystery thriller television series from channel M6, set in the French Pyrenees. The six-episode series is an adaptation of the novel of the same name by Bernard Minier.

The Frozen Dead premiered in France on M6 on 10 January 2017. It became available for streaming in Australia on SBS on Demand in August 2017, and released internationally on Netflix on 1 January 2018.

== Plot ==
The story begins with the discovery of the headless corpse of a horse that belongs to wealthy businessman Eric Lombard, in the French Pyrenees town of Saint-Martin-de-Comminges. The case is then investigated by Commander Martin Servaz, assisted by local police Captain Irène Ziegler.

When Servaz and Ziegler find the horse's head, they also find at the crime scene DNA that is determined to be that of serial killer Julian Hirtmann. Hirtmann, however, is incarcerated at Warnier, a high-security psychiatric prison, where young psychiatrist Diane Berg is showing an unusual interest in him. The case is later found to be linked to the suicides of three teenage girls at a summer camp 15 years earlier.

== Cast and characters ==
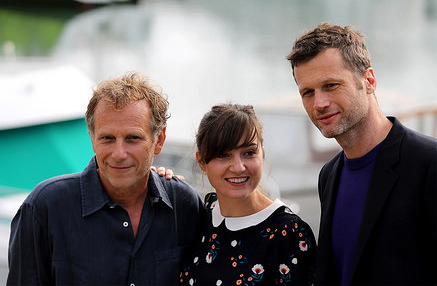
Charles Berling, Nina Meurisse and Robert Plagnol from The Frozen Dead

=== Main ===
- Charles Berling as Cmdr. Martin Servaz, head of the criminal investigation department of a Toulouse police division
- Julia Piaton as Capt. Irène Ziegler, head of Saint Martin's detective squad
- Pascal Greggory as Julian Hirtmann, a former prosecutor incarcerated in Warnier
- Nina Meurisse as Diane Berg, a new psychiatrist at the prison
- Lubna Azabal as Elisabeth Ferney, the head psychiatrist at the prison
- Anne Le Ny as Catherine "Cathy" d'Humières, a town prosecutor.
- Robinson Stévenin as Raphaël Delaunay
- Robert Plagnol as Eric Lombard, wealthy owner of "Freedom", the decapitated horse
- Sophie Guillemin as Greta, partner of Irène Ziegler and owner of the local inn where Servaz is staying

=== Recurring ===
- Alain Fromager as Francois Levasseur

== Development and production ==
The series was produced by Gaumont Télévision and co-produced by Métropole Télévision. Directed by Laurent Herbiet, it was created and written by Gérard Carré, Caroline Van Ruymbeke and Pascal Chaumeil, with a script from Hamid Hlioua and Laurent Herbiet based on the 2011 novel Glacé by Bernard Minier. Filming in the French Pyrenees started on 15 February 2016 and wrapped in early April. Among the locations used are the towns of Bagnères-de-Luchon and Garin, and the Peyragudes ski resort.

The image used in the title sequence was inspired by a painting by August Friedrich Schenck and represents the harshness of winter and the cruelty of predators towards their prey. The mysterious cloaked figure symbolizes Julian Hirtmann, the manipulative character in the series. The title sequence is accompanied by a children's choir rendition of the song "Hurt" by Nine Inch Nails.

== Release ==
The Frozen Dead premiered in France on 10 January 2017. Netflix acquired worldwide distributions rights in October 2017, and released the series from 1 January 2018 to October 2021.

== Reception ==
=== Ratings ===
The debut on M6 was watched by a peak overnight audience of 4.85 million viewers, an audience share of 19.3%. It was the best premiere of a French drama on the channel since 2010. It averaged at 4.3 million over the first two episodes in the first week, and reached 5.1 million viewers over a seven-day period. However, the audience totals decreased in the subsequent weeks, falling to 2.8 million for the next two episodes the following week, and 2.7 million viewers for the final two episodes. It had an average audience of 3.28 million (14% audience share) over the entire series, rising to 4 million in consolidated ratings with an average gain of 760,000 viewers per episode, the best 7 day catch up viewing figure for the channel since Quantico.

=== Awards and nominations ===
The Frozen Dead was an entry at the Festival de la Fiction TV de La Rochelle in September 2016, where it won the "Best Series" award.

== Episodes ==
=== Season 1 (2017) ===
No.	Title	Original release date	France viewers (millions)
1	"Episode 1"	10 January 2017	4.8
2	"Episode 2"	10 January 2017	3.8
3	"Episode 3"	17 January 2017	3.0
4	"Episode 4"	17 January 2017	2.5
5	"Episode 5"	24 January 2017	2.9
6	"Episode 6"	24 January 2017	2.6
