= Florence Thomassin =

French actress and sculptor (born 1966)

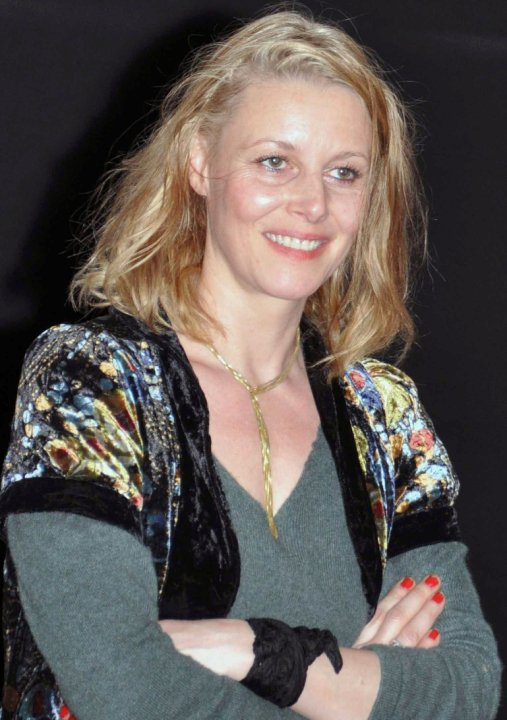
- Thomassin in 2010
- Born: 24 June 1966 (age 60); Paris, France
- Occupations: Actress, sculptor
- Years active: 1989–present

Florence Thomassin (French pronunciation: [flɔʁɑ̃s tɔmasɛ̃]; born 24 June 1966) is a French actress and sculptor. In 2001, Thomassin was nominated for a César Award for Best Supporting Actress for her role of Beatrice in Bernard Rapp's A Question of Taste ("Une affaire de goût").

== Filmography ==
| Year | Title | Role | Director | Notes |
|---|---|---|---|---|
| 1989 | Le crime d'Antoine | The nurse | Marc Rivière | |
| 1989 | Un père et passe | | Sébastien Grall | |
| 1990 | La vie sur Mars | | Renée Blanchar | Short |
| 1990 | La seconde | Inès Irrigoyen | Christopher Frank | TV movie |
| 1990 | A Violent Life | Madame d'Estampes | Giacomo Battiato | |
| 1990 | Les lendemains qui tuent | Thérèse | Daniel Duval | TV movie |
| 1991 | Le jeu du roi | Ségolène | Marc Evans | TV movie |
| 1991 | Annabelle partagée | Laurence | Francesca Comencini | |
| 1993 | Catherine Courage | Catherine | Jacques Ertaud | TV movie |
| 1994 | Mina Tannenbaum | The cousin | Martine Dugowson | |
| 1995 | Ainsi soient-elles | Jeanne | Patrick Alessandrin, Lisa Azuelos | |
| 1995 | Élisa | Élisa Desmoulin | Jean Becker | |
| 1995 | Le mas Théotime | Geneviève | Philomène Esposito | TV movie |
| 1996 | Beaumarchais | Marion Menard | Édouard Molinaro | |
| 1996 | Des nouvelles du bon Dieu | | Didier Le Pêcheur | |
| 1996 | Les victimes | Manou | Patrick Grandperret | |
| 1996 | Vice vertu et vice versa | Barbara Franklin | Françoise Romand | TV movie |
| 1997 | Dobermann | Florence | Jan Kounen | |
| 1997 | Inca de Oro | France | Patrick Grandperret (2) | TV movie |
| 1997 | Une vie pour une autre | Mélanie | Henri Helman | TV movie |
| 1998 | Le Plaisir (et ses petits tracas) | Lise | Nicolas Boukhrief | |
| 1999 | L'île au bout du monde | | Henri Herré | |
| 1999 | Paddy | Norma | Gérard Mordillat | |
| 1999 | Empty Days | Sophie | Marion Vernoux | |
| 1999 | Les vilains | Anna | Xavier Durringer | TV movie |
| 2000 | A Question of Taste | Béatrice | Bernard Rapp | Nominated - César Award for Best Supporting Actress |
| 2000 | Les sagards | Marie | Dominique Ladoge | TV movie |
| 2001 | Marie Fransson | Aude Gaillard | Christiane Spiero | TV series (1 episode) |
| 2001 | Les alizés | Marie Caron | Stéphane Kurc | TV movie |
| 2001 | L'apprentissage de la ville | Arlette | Gérard Mordillat (2) | TV movie |
| 2002 | Hôpital souterrain | Isabelle | Serge Meynard | TV movie |
| 2003 | Le gang des poupées | Michèle | Philomène Esposito (2) | TV movie |
| 2003 | La maîtresse du corroyeur | Henriette | Claude Grinberg | TV movie |
| 2003 | Le Cœur des hommes | Juliette | Marc Esposito | |
| 2004 | L'instit | Clémentine | Bruno Dega | TV series (1 episode) |
| 2004 | Capone | Carole | Jean-Marc Brondolo | TV movie |
| 2004 | A Very Long Engagement | Narrator | Jean-Pierre Jeunet | |
| 2005 | Félix Leclerc | Lucienne Vernay | Claude Fournier | TV mini-series |
| 2005 | Cold Showers | Annie | Antony Cordier | |
| 2005 | Nuit noire, 17 octobre 1961 | Nathalie | Alain Tasma | TV movie |
| 2005 | L'anniversaire | Jenny | Diane Kurys | |
| 2006 | Poussière d'amour | Hélène | Philippe Venault | TV movie |
| 2006 | Comme deux gouttes d'eau | Sabine Carnot | Stéphane Kurc (2) | TV movie |
| 2006 | Président | Judge Benoît | Lionel Delplanque | |
| 2006 | Le Grand Meaulnes | Madame Meaulnes | Jean-Daniel Verhaeghe | |
| 2006 | Tell No One | Charlotte Bertaud | Guillaume Canet | |
| 2007 | Lundi, 35 milligrammes | Madame Brumont | Benoît Lestang | Short |
| 2007 | Ill Wind | Laure Castel | Stéphane Allagnon | |
| 2007 | Le Cœur des hommes 2 | Juliette | Marc Esposito (2) | |
| 2008 | 57000 km entre nous | Margot | Delphine Kreuter | |
| 2008 | Le silence de l'épervier | Anne | Dominique Ladoge (2) | TV mini-series |
| 2008 | Soit je meurs, soit je vais mieux | Sabine | Laurence Ferreira Barbosa | |
| 2008 | Terre de lumière | Paula | Stéphane Kurc (3) | TV mini-series (4 episodes) |
| 2008 | L'instinct de mort | Sarah | Jean-François Richet | |
| 2009 | Suite noire | Cookie | Patrick Grandperret (3) | TV series (1 episode) |
| 2010 | Turk's Head | Mouna | Pascal Elbé | |
| 2010 | The Princess of Montpensier | Marquise de Mézières | Bertrand Tavernier | |
| 2010 | Roses à crédit | Marie | Amos Gitai | |
| 2010 | Les vivants et les morts | Mickie | Gérard Mordillat (3) | TV series (8 episodes) |
| 2011 | 17 Girls | Camille's mother | Delphine Coulin, Muriel Coulin | |
| 2012 | Dubaï Flamingo | Livia | Delphine Kreuter (2) | |
| 2012 | Les cinq parties du monde | Linda | Gérard Mordillat (4) | TV movie |
| 2012 | Paradis perdu | Sonia | Ève Deboise | |
| 2012 | La ballade de Kouski | Sandra | Olivier Langlois | TV movie |
| 2012 | Comme des frères | Line | Hugo Gélin | |
| 2012 | Spiral | Madame Jorkal | Jean-Marc Brondolo (2) | TV series (1 episode) |
| 2013 | Tiger Lily, quatre femmes dans la vie | Rita | Benoît Cohen | TV mini-series (6 episodes) |
| 2013 | 12 ans d'âge | Cathy | Frédéric Proust | |
| 2013 | Le Cœur des hommes 3 | Juliette | Marc Esposito (3) | |
| 2014 | Ablations | Anna | Arnold de Parscau | |
| 2014 | Derrière Toi | Mother | Celeste Rogosin | Short |
| 2015 | Les nuits d'été | Florence Weissweiller | Mario Fanfani | |
| 2015 | Hiszpanka | Anne Besaint | Lukasz Barczyk | |
| 2015 | Spectrographies | Rosa | Dorothée Smith | |
| 2015 | The Boss's Daughter | Madeleine | Olivier Loustau | |
| 2016 | Arrête ton cinéma | Chacha | Diane Kurys | |
| 2017 | Capitaine Marleau | Mathilde Liorade | Josée Dayan | TV series (1 episode) |
