= Robert Plagnol =

French actor

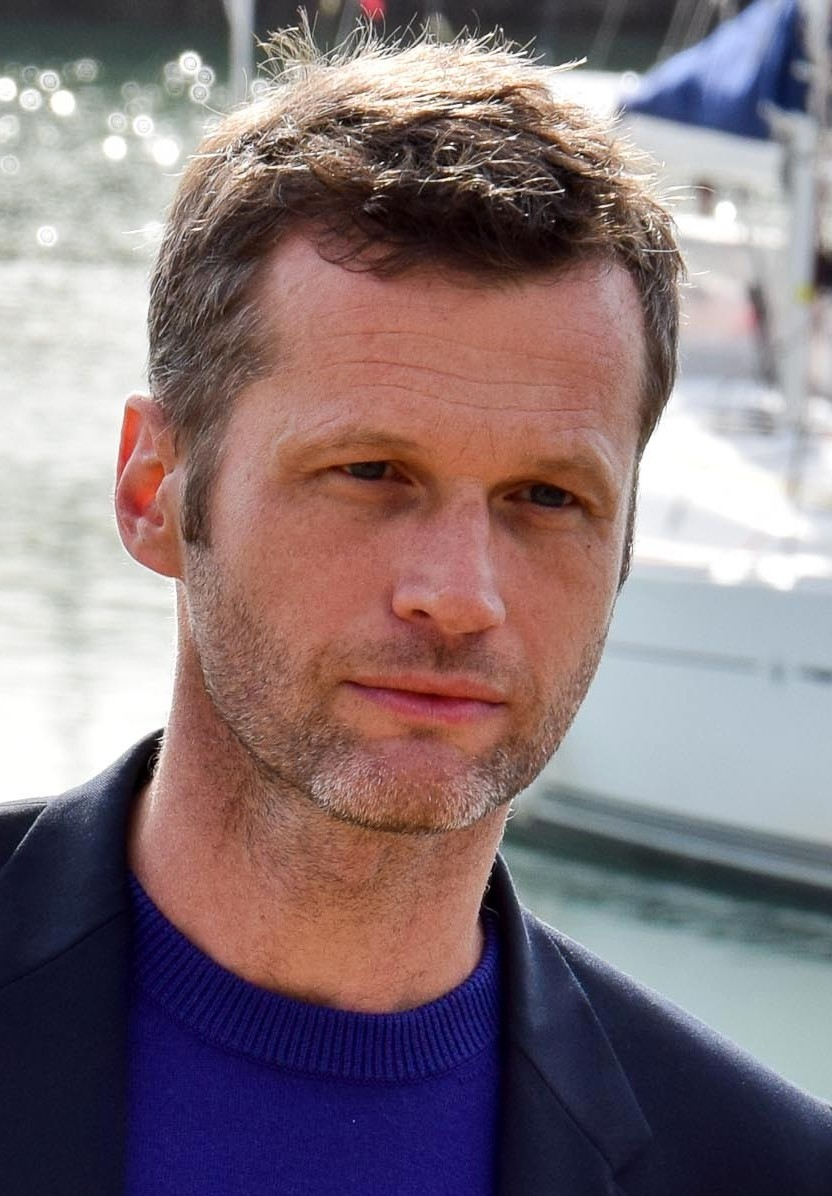
- Occupation: Actor
- Years active: 1992–present

Robert Plagnol is a French actor, who starred as Boris Vildé in the French TV series Résistance.

Plagnol has appeared in numerous films, TV shows and plays.

== Filmography ==
- 2013: Joséphine, ange gardien (TV Series / 1 Episode): Alex
- 2015: Call My Agent ! (TV Series / 1 Episode): Clément
- 2017: The Frozen Dead (TV series / 6 episodes): Eric Lombard
