= Guillaume Durand (journalist) =

French television presenter

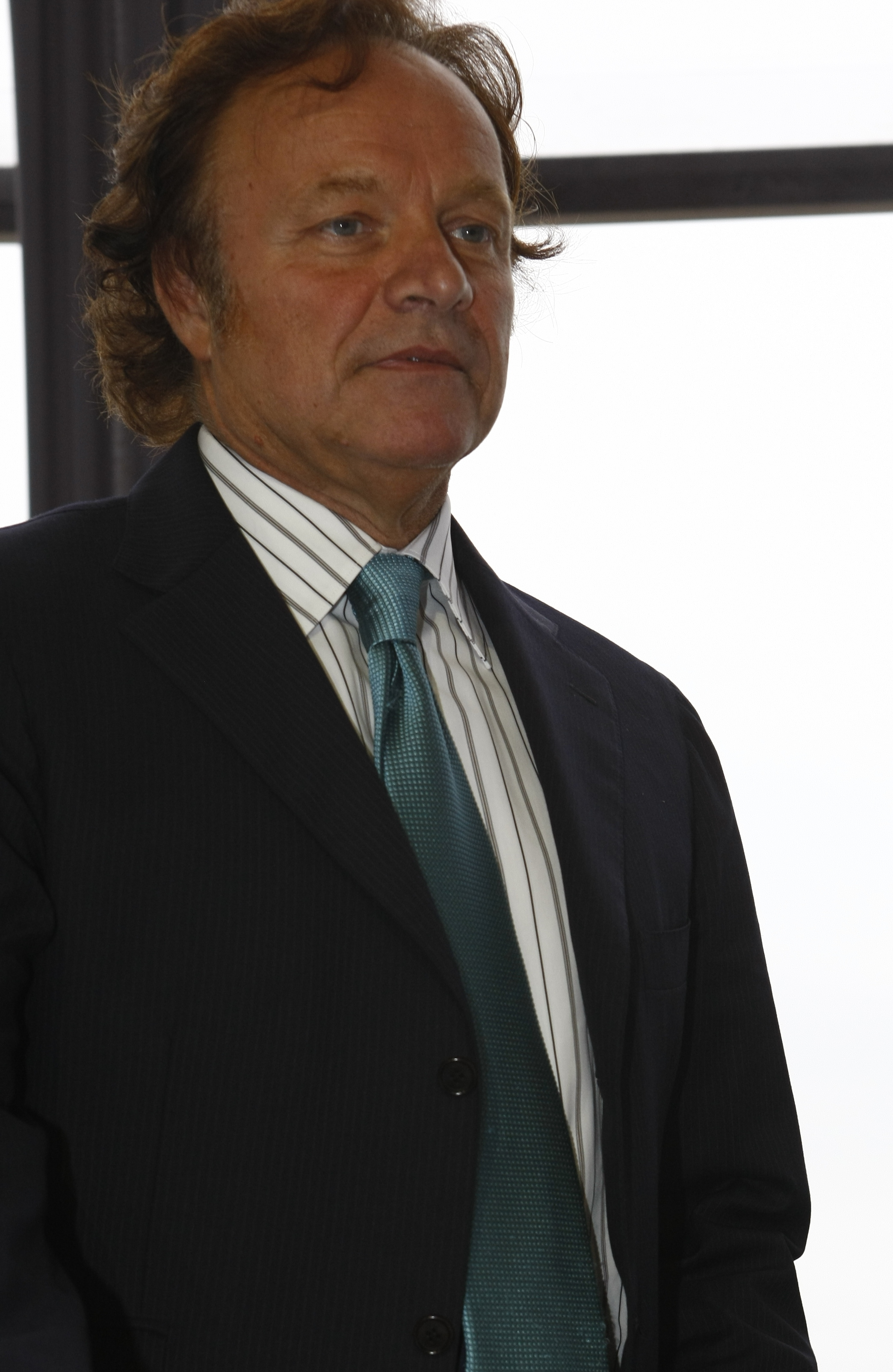
- Guillaume Durand in 2008
- Born: 23 September 1952 (age 73); Boulogne-Billancourt, France
- Occupation: Television journalist

Guillaume Durand is a French journalist, born 23 September 1952, in Boulogne-Billancourt (Hauts-de-Seine).

Son of French artists Lucien and Nicole Durand and formerly a professor of history and geography, he was a weekend newsreader and evening the weekday prime time newsreader on La Cinq (1987–1990 and 1990–1991). Host of Nulle Part Ailleurs on Canal +, he went to France 2 Esprits Libres (2006–2008), L'objet du scandale (2009).

He hosts a talk show on Europe 1 as well as La Matinale on Radio Classique.

He married his second wife, Diane de MacMahon (descendant of Patrice de MacMahon, 3rd President of the French Republic), and he is the father of four children.

== Journalism ==
- Europe 1
- La Cinq
- Canal +
- France 2
