= Human Resources (1999 film) =

1999 film by Laurent Cantet

Ressources humaines
- Film poster
- Directed by: Laurent Cantet
- Written by: Laurent Cantet; Gilles Marchand
- Produced by: Caroline Benjo; Carole Scotta
- Starring: Jalil Lespert
- Cinematography: Matthieu Poirot-Delpech
- Edited by: Robin Campillo; Stephanie Leger
- Distributed by: Haut et Court (France)
- Release date: September 1999 (San Sebastián)
- Running time: 100 minutes
- Countries: France; United Kingdom
- Language: French
- Budget: € 1.1 million

Human Resources (French: Ressources humaines) is a 1999 French-British comedy drama film directed by Laurent Cantet. As the title implies, the subject of the film is the workplace and the personal difficulties that result from conflicts among management and labour, corporations and individuals. It stars Jalil Lespert. Most of the other actors are non-professionals. It won the César Award for Best First Feature Film and the César Award for Most Promising Actor at the 26th César Awards.

== Plot ==
In Gaillon, Normandy, "good son" Franck returns to his hometown to do a trainee managerial internship in the Human Resources department of the factory where his anxious, taciturn father has worked on the shop floor for 30 years. At first, Franck is lauded by both friends and family for breaking through the glass ceiling and becoming "white-collar". But very soon hidden envy and rivalries erupt. Franck forms a friendship with Alain, a young worker whom his father has mentored. This mentoring in the blue-collar workforce is contrasted with the cagier, trust-less mentoring Franck receives in the white-collar world from his own supervisor, Chambon.

Franck discovers that his boss is going to use Franck's field study on the proposed 35-hour workweek to justify downsizing - and that Franck's father is among those to be let go. This leads to a confrontation between the trainee and management, between the workers and the owners, and ultimately between son and father. In the emotional climax, Franck confronts his father and accuses him of imbuing him with a legacy of shame at being blue-collar.

== Cast ==
- Jalil Lespert as Franck
- Jean-Claude Vallod as Father
- Chantal Barré as Mother
- Véronique de Pandelaère as Sylvie
- Michel Begnez as Olivier
- Lucien Longueville as The Boss
- Danielle Mélador as Madame Arnoux
- Pascal Sémard as Human Resources Director
- Didier Emile-Woldemard as Alain
- Françoise Boutigny as Betty
- Félix Cantet as Félix
- Marie Cantet as Marie
- Stéphane Tauvel as Christian
- Stéphanie Chevret as The Secretary

== Critical response ==
Human Resources received generally positive reviews from critics. On Rotten Tomatoes, the film has a rating of 97%, based on 32 reviews. On Metacritic, the film has a score of 78 out of 100, based on 25 critics, indicating "generally favorable reviews".

Stephen Holden of The New York Times wrote, "As schematic as it becomes, Human Resources never loses its poignant human dimension. It is so beautifully acted that the cast, especially the nonprofessional actors playing the embattled factory workers, seems plucked from the streets of a provincial French town." Sight & Sound described the film as "generous, sensitive and innovative. It is a film in which, in the widest possible sense, the personal is political." Mick LaSalle of the San Francisco Chronicle said it "is a rare film about the class and educational divide that can happen even within families", while Lisa Schwarzbaum of Entertainment Weekly called it "a compelling, cant-free drama about clashing class systems and challenged family relationships that's all the more engrossing for its organic, near-documentary style", and gave the film an "A-" grade.

== Accolades ==
- César Awards
  - Winner – Most Promising Actor (Jalil Lespert)
  - Winner – Best First Work (Laurent Cantet)
  - Nominee – Best Original Screenplay (Laurent Cantet, Gilles Marchand)
- Emden International Film Festival
  - Winner – Award of the German Unions Association (Laurent Cantet)
- European Film Awards
  - Winner – European Discovery of the Year (Laurent Cantet)
- Lumiere Awards
  - Winner – Most Promising Young Actor (Jalil Lespert)
- Louis Delluc Prize
  - Winner – Best First Film (Laurent Cantet)
- San Sebastián International Film Festival
  - Winner – Best New Director (Laurent Cantet)
- Seattle International Film Festival
  - Winner – New Director's Showcase Award (Laurent Cantet)
- Thessaloniki International Film Festival
  - Winner – Best Screenplay (Laurent Cantet, Gilles Marchand)
  - Nominee – Golden Alexander (Laurent Cantet)
- Torino Film Festival
  - Winner – Best First Feature Film (Laurent Cantet)
  - Winner – Cipputi Award (Laurent Cantet)
  - Winner – Special Mention for Feature Film (Jean-Claude Vallod)
  - Nominee – Best Feature Film (Laurent Cantet)
