= Ill Wind (film) =

2007 film by Stéphane Allagnon

- Directed by: Stéphane Allagnon
- Written by: Stéphane Allagnon
- Produced by: Caroline Bonmarchand
- Starring: Jonathan Zaccaï; Aure Atika; Bernard Le Coq; Florence Thomassin; Guillaume Viry; Jo Prestia; Saïd Serrari
- Cinematography: Yves Cape
- Edited by: Mike Fromentin
- Music by: Frédérique Fortuny and Jeff Hallam
- Production companies: Avenue B Gaumont
- Distributed by: Gaumont Columbia TriStar Films
- Release date: 13 June 2007
- Running time: 92 minutes
- Country: France
- Language: French
- Budget: € 3 million

Ill Wind (French: Vent mauvais) is a 2007 French film written and directed by Stéphane Allagnon. Sent to repair the computers at a supermarket in a town hit by a storm, a technician discovers some unusual things and is faced with difficult decisions.

== Plot ==
Stephane Allagnon's crime comedy Before the Storm stars Jonathan Zaccai as Frank, a tech worker assigned to fix the aged computer system of a store after a weather incident knocked it out. During the work, he uncovers a piece of code that embezzled money from the company. When the number one suspect turns up dead, Frank finds himself trying to piece together who is responsible with the help of some quirky locals.
