= Bernard Le Coq =

French actor (born 1950)

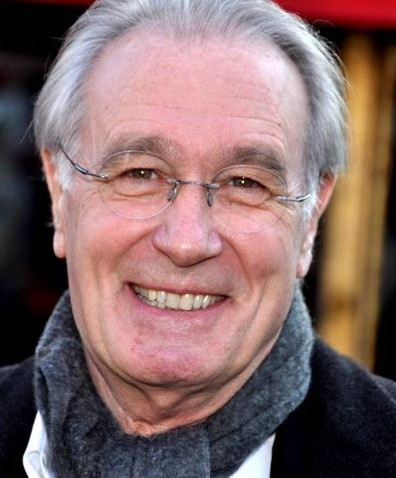
- Bernard Le Coq at the 2012 César Awards
- Born: 25 September 1950 (age 75); Le Blanc, France
- Occupation: Actor
- Years active: 1967–present

Bernard Le Coq (born 25 September 1950) is a French actor. He has appeared in more than one hundred and fifty films since 1967. His first big role Bernard Le Coq has played as Annie Girardot's son and Claude Jade's brother in the family drama Hearth Fires by Serge Korber in 1972. He won a César Award for Best Actor in a Supporting Role in 2002 for his performance as Prof. Christian Licht in Beautiful Memories.

== Onstage ==
Year	Title	Author	Director	Notes
1976	Une aspirine pour deux	Woody Allen	Francis Perrin	Théâtre du Gymnase Marie Bell
1977	Mercredi trois quarts	Helvio Soto	Maurice Garrel	
1980	À la renverse	Michel Vinaver	Jacques Lassalle	Théâtre national de Chaillot
1982	L'Étrangleur s'excite	Éric Naggar	Jean Rochefort	Théâtre Hébertot
1982	Trois fois rien	Catherine Allégret & Eliane Borras	Henri Helman	
2003	War of the Roses	Lee Blessing	Daniel Delprat	

== Filmography ==
Year	Title	Role	Director	Notes
1967	Les grandes vacances	Jean-Christophe	Jean Girault	
1968	Béru et ces dames	The young farmer	Guy Lefranc	
1968	The Private Lesson	Jean-Pierre	Michel Boisrond	
1969	Faites donc plaisir aux amis	Jerry	Francis Rigaud	
1969	La honte de la famille	Jérôme Ratières	Richard Balducci	
1970	Du soleil plein les yeux	Bernard	Michel Boisrond (2)	
1970	La liberté en croupe	Albin Cérès	Édouard Molinaro	
1972	Hearth Fires	Jean-Paul Boursault	Serge Korber	
1972	César and Rosalie	Michel	Claude Sautet	
1973	Le gang des otages		Édouard Molinaro (2)	
1973	The Burned Barns	Paul Cateux	Jean Chapot	
1973	Le concierge	Christophe Mérignac	Jean Girault (2)	
1974	Comme un pot de fraises	Marc	Jean Aurel	
1974	Mariage	The 1974's man	Claude Lelouch	
1974	Histoires insolites	Georges	Édouard Molinaro (3)	TV series (1 episode)
1975	Vous ne l'emporterez pas au paradis	Pierre	François Dupont-Midi	
1975	C'est dur pour tout le monde	Laurent	Christian Gion	
1975	La bulle	Erwin	Raphael Rebibo	
1977	Ne me touchez pas...	Jean-Claude Mayer	Richard Guillon	
1977	Le diable dans la boîte	Allard	Pierre Lary	
1977	Les folies Offenbach	Tabuteau	Michel Boisrond (3)	TV mini-series (1 episode)
1977	Cinéma 16	Gilles	Jean Hennin	TV series (1 episode)
1978	Le franc-tireur	Jacques Maréchal	Maurice Failevic	TV movie
1978	Surprise Sock	Raphaël	Jean-François Davy	
1978	Le temps d'une République	Henri	Michel Wyn	TV series (1 episode)
1978	Histoire du chevalier Des Grieux et de Manon Lescaut	The son	Jean Delannoy	TV mini-series (1 episode)
1978	Messieurs les ronds de cuir	Lahrier	Daniel Ceccaldi	TV movie
1978	Cinéma 16	Jérôme	Edmond Séchan	TV series (1 episode)
1979	Le troisième couteau	Émile	Robert Valey	TV movie
1979	An Adventure for Two	The photographer	Claude Lelouch	
1979	Histoires insolites	Parkan	Maurice Ronet	TV series (1 episode)
1979	The Medic	Gérôme	Pierre Granier-Deferre	
1980	Les amours de la belle époque			TV series (1 episode)
1980	Caméra une première	An Inspector	Claude Vajda	TV series (1 episode)
1980	Des vertes et des pas mûres	Claude	Maurice Delbez	TV movie
1980	Pile ou face	Philippe	Robert Enrico	
1980	T'inquiète pas, ça se soigne	Fernand Tabard	Eddy Matalon	
1980	Three Men to Kill	Gassowitz	Jacques Deray	
1980	Cinéma 16	Him	Edmond Séchan (2)	TV series (1 episode)
1981	Un chien de saison	Félix	Bernard-Roland	TV movie
1981	La chèvre d'or	Paul	Jean Dasque	TV movie
1981	Birgitt Haas Must Be Killed	Colonna	Laurent Heynemann	
1981	Le serment d'Heidelberg	Nicolas Blondeau	André Farwagi	TV movie
1982	Un pasota con corbata	David Santander	Jesús Terrón	
1982	L'étrangleur s'excite	Jim Mac Milland	Alexandre Tarta	TV movie
1983	Tout le monde peut se tromper	Inspector Tom Tarnopol	Jean Couturier	
1984	The Blood of Others	Jean Blomart's dubbing	Claude Chabrol	
1984	Jeans Tonic	Kant	Michel Patient	
1985	Julien Fontanes, magistrat	Judge Gallie	André Farwagi (2)	TV series (1 episode)
1985	Clémence Aletti	François Gireau	Peter Kassovitz	TV series
1986	Cinéma 16	Dimitri	Jean-Claude Charnay	TV series (1 episode)
1986	La force du destin		Maurice Frydland	TV Short
1986	La bague au doigt		Agnès Delarive	TV series
1987	Opération Ypsilon	Victor Tokarev	Peter Kassovitz (2)	TV movie
1987	Ludovic Sanders reine de la jungle	Ludovic Sanders	Peter Kassovitz (3)	TV movie
1988	Julien Fontanes, magistrat	Judge Gallie	Michel Berny	TV series (1 episode)
1988	Gros coeurs	Jean-Noël Tavernier	Pierre Joassin	
1989	Thank You Satan	The monk	André Farwagi (3)	
1989	L'agence		Jean Sagols	TV series
1989	Pause-café	Alain	Serge Leroy & Charles L. Bitsch	TV series (8 episodes)
1989	Panique aux Caraïbes	Tony	Serge Korber (2)	TV series (1 episode)
1990	La belle Anglaise	Éric	Jacques Besnard	TV series (1 episode)
1990	Feu sur le candidat	Commissioner Peter Tammard	Agnès Delarive (2)	
1991	Van Gogh	Theo van Gogh	Maurice Pialat	Nominated - César Award for Best Supporting Actor
1991	L'héritière	Richard Belfond	Jean Sagols (2)	TV movie
1992	Softwar	Bernard Leforestier	Michel Lang	TV movie
1992–present	Une famille formidable	Jacques Beaumont	Joël Santoni (3) & Alexandre Pidoux	TV series (32 episodes)
1993	Les grandes marées	François Chevalier	Jean Sagols (3)	TV mini-series
1993	Le galopin	Victor Dupuis	Serge Korber (3)	TV movie
1993	Amok	The traveler	Joël Farges	
1994	Elles ne pensent qu'à ça...	Pierre	Charlotte Dubreuil	
1994	The Patriots	Bill Haydon	Éric Rochant	
1994	Vengeances	Vincent Pelissier	Miguel Courtois	TV movie
1995	Y a pas de lézard		Marianne Binard	TV movie
1995	Chercheur d'héritiers	Maxime Levesque	Laurent Heynemann (2)	TV series (1 episode)
1995	Police des polices		Michel Boisrond (4)	TV series (1 episode)
1995	Les hommes et les femmes sont faits pour vivre heureux... mais pas ensemble	Alfred	Philippe de Broca	TV movie
1995	Arthur		Félicie Dutertre & François Rabes	Short
1996	C'est jamais loin	Estier	Alain Centonze	
1996	My Man	Inspector Marvier	Bertrand Blier	
1996	Folle de moi	François Guérin	Pierre Joassin (2)	TV movie
1996	Capitaine Conan	Lieutenant De Scève	Bertrand Tavernier	
1996	Berjac	Berjac	Jean-Michel Ribes	TV mini-series
1996	Après coup		Bertina Henrichs	Short
1996	17 ans et des poussières		Joël Santoni	TV movie
1997	Bouge!	Tony Sachs	Jérôme Cornuau	
1997	Jeunesse	Dorval	Noël Alpi	
1997	La bastide blanche	Roumisse	Miguel Courtois (2)	TV mini-series
1997	Mauvaises affaires	Philippe Moreau	Jean-Louis Bertucelli	TV movie
1997	La cité des alouettes	Marc	Luc Béraud	TV movie
1998	The School of Flesh	Cordier	Benoît Jacquot	
1998	Le clone	François	Fabio Conversi	
1998	Restons groupés	Jean-Michel	Jean-Paul Salomé	
1998	The Cloud	Eduardo	Fernando Solanas	
1999	Mission protection rapprochée		Gérard Marx	TV series (1 episode)
1999	Le destin des Steenfort	Adrien Steenfort	Jean-Daniel Verhaeghe	TV mini-series
2000	La taule	The director	Alain Robak	
2000	Mémoires en fuite	Frédéric Lemoyne	François Marthouret	TV movie
2000	La canne de mon père	Charles Bertoux	Jacques Renard	TV movie
2001	Un couple modèle	Romain	Charlotte Brandström	TV movie
2001	Un ange	Pascal Olmetti	Miguel Courtois (3)	
2001	Nana	Paul Muffat	Édouard Molinaro (4)	TV movie
2001	Beautiful Memories	Professor Christian Licht	Zabou Breitman	César Award for Best Supporting Actor
2001	L'assurance est un plat qui se mange froid		Daniel Jenny	Short
2002	Y a pas d'âge pour s'aimer	Roland	Thierry Chabert	TV movie Luchon International Film Festival - Best Actor
2002	Féroce	Cervois	Gilles de Maistre	
2002	Romance sans paroles	Emmanuel	Jean-Daniel Verhaeghe (2)	TV movie
2002	Une Ferrari pour deux	André Herbault	Charlotte Brandström (2)	TV movie
2002	Au plus près du paradis	Bernard	Tonie Marshall	
2003	Un fils de notre temps	The father	Fabrice Cazeneuve	TV movie
2003	The Flower of Evil	Gérard Vasseur	Claude Chabrol (2)	
2003	Les enfants du miracle	Antoine Daumier	Sébastien Grall	TV movie
2003	Une villa pour deux	Daniel	Charlotte Brandström (3)	TV movie
2004	La fuite de Monsieur Monde	Lionel Monde	Claude Goretta	TV movie
2004	Pourquoi (pas) le Brésil	Maurice Rey	Laetitia Masson	
2004	The Bridesmaid	Gérard Courtois	Claude Chabrol (3)	
2004	L'abbaye du revoir	Jean-Pierre Descombes	Jérôme Anger	TV movie
2005	Les femmes d'abord	Adam	Peter Kassovitz (4)	TV movie
2005	Le premier jour	Géraud de Frémincourt	Luc Saint-Sernin	Short
2005	Vous êtes libre?	Fabien	Pierre Joassin (3)	TV movie
2005	Kaamelott	Fearmac	Alexandre Astier	TV series (1 episode)
2005	Caché	Georges's Boss	Michael Haneke	
2005	Joyeux Noël	The general	Christian Carion	
2005	La Boîte noire	Walcott	Richard Berry	
2005	S.A.C.: Des hommes dans l'ombre	Ferrand	Thomas Vincent	TV movie
2006	Commissaire Cordier	Daniel Morin	Christophe Douchand	TV series (1 episode)
2006	L'année suivante	François	Isabelle Czajka	
2006	Vive la bombe!	Antoine	Jean-Pierre Sinapi	TV movie
2006	Times Have Been Better (Le ciel sur la tête)	Guy	Régis Musset	TV movie
2006	GAL	The President	Miguel Courtois (4)	
2006	L'occitanienne	René de Chateaubriand	Jean Périssé	
2007	Qui va à la chasse...	Daniel Valmer	Olivier Laubacher	TV movie
2007	Le clan Pasquier	Ram Pasquier	Jean-Daniel Verhaeghe (3)	TV mini-series
2007	Ill Wind	Hopquin	Stéphane Allagnon	
2007	Où es-tu?	The monk	Miguel Courtois (5)	TV mini-series
2007	Pas tout de suite...	Benjamin Didot	Marianne Lamour	TV movie
2007	L'affaire Ben Barka	Papon	Jean-Pierre Sinapi (2)	TV movie
2007	Marié(s) ou presque	Marcel	Franck Llopis	
2008	L'affaire Bruay-en-Artois	Lawyer Jean-Noël Ferret	Charlotte Brandström (4)	TV movie
2008	Skate or Die	Carpentier	Miguel Courtois (6)	
2008	Désobéir (Aristides de Sousa Mendes)	Aristides de Sousa Mendes	Joël Santoni (2)	TV movie
2008	Clara Sheller	Gilles's father	Alain Berliner	TV series (1 episode)
2009	Facteur chance	Gilbert	Julien Seri	TV movie
2009	La grande vie	Mascrier	Emmanuel Salinger	
2009	Aveugle mais pas trop	Vincent	Charlotte Brandström (5)	TV movie
2009	Myster Mocky présente		Jean-Pierre Mocky	TV series (1 episode)
2009	Rose et noir	Castaing	Gérard Jugnot	
2009	Cavalier seul	Arman Kafedjian	Vincent Mariette	Short
2009	Les Ames Pixellisées	Julie's grandfather	Michael Castellanet	Short
2010	Comment va la douleur?	Simon	François Marthouret (2)	TV movie
2010	Streamfield, les carnets noirs	Dominique Menacci	Jean-Luc Miesch	
2011	V comme Vian	Raymond Queneau	Philippe Le Guay	TV movie
2011	Isabelle disparue	Louis Ponton de Barsac	Bernard Stora	TV movie
2011	Une vie française	Jean Villandreux	Jean-Pierre Sinapi (3)	TV movie
2011	Le temps du silence	Manuel	Franck Apprederis	TV movie
2011	Une cible dans le dos	Christian	Bernard Uzan	TV movie
2011	Monsieur Papa	M. Forlani	Kad Merad	
2011	The Conquest	Jacques Chirac	Xavier Durringer	Nominated - César Award for Best Supporting Actor
2011	I Love Périgord	Adémar	Charles Nemes	TV movie
2011	Consultation	The neurologist	Isabelle Bauthian	Short
2012	Le bonheur des Dupré	Bruno	Bruno Chiche	TV movie
2012	Frère & soeur	Bruno Cellini	Denis Malleval	TV movie
2012	Capital	Antoine de Suze	Costa-Gavras	
2012	Mes deux amours	Hadrien Darcourt	Régis Musset (2)	TV movie
2013	La dernière campagne	Jacques Chirac	Bernard Stora (2)	TV movie Biarritz International Festival of Audiovisual Programming - Best Actor
2013	Le goût du partage	Victor	Sandrine Cohen	TV movie
2014	La fabuleuse histoire de Monsieur Riquet	Riquet	Jean Périssé (2)	
2014	En Direct Sur	Frank	Lancelot Mingau	Short
2014	Rouge sang	César	Xavier Durringer (2)	TV movie
2015	Au revoir... et à bientôt	Henri Duvallois	Miguel Courtois (7)	TV movie
2017	C'est beau la vie quand on y pense		Gérard Jugnot (2)	
2018	J'ai perdu Albert	Georges	Didier Van Cauwelaert	
