= Jacqueline Caurat =

French television presenter and journalist (1927–2021)

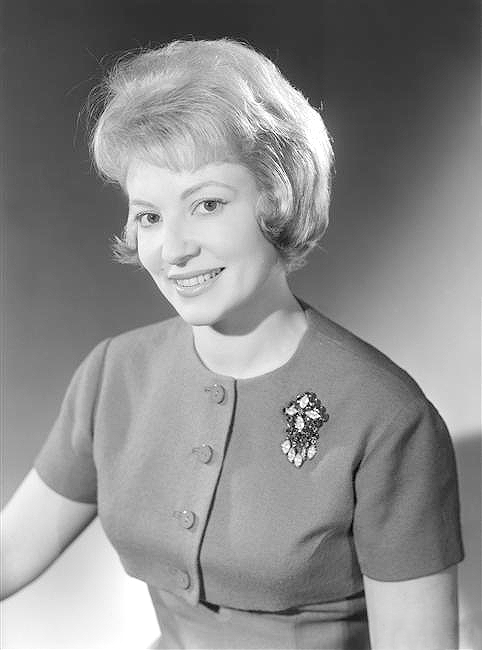
- Caurat in 1954
- Born: 23 July 1927; Croydon, United Kingdom
- Died: 22 May 2021 (aged 93)
- Spouse: Jacques Mancier

Jacqueline Caurat (23 July 1927 – 22 May 2021) was a French television presenter and journalist.

After a film career during the 1940s and 1950s, Caurat became an in-vision continuity announcer (or speakerine) for the ORTF's first channel.

For 22 years, she presented and co-produced Télé-Philatélie, a series about philately also co-presented by her husband Jacques Mancier. It was during this series that she interviewed high-profile philatelists such as Prince Rainier III of Monaco and stamp designers/engravers.

== Filmography ==
Year	Title	Role	Notes
1947	Les aventures de Casanova	La bonne de Clotilde	Uncredited
1947	La grande Maguet		
1948	Les souvenirs ne sont pas à vendre		
1957	Sénéchal the Magnificent	Nicole, une soubrette	
1959	The Tiger Attacks	La présentatrice	Uncredited
1959	Oh! Qué mambo	La présentatrice	Uncredited
1959	Mon pote le gitan	La reporter	
