= Sophie Guillemin =

French actress (born 1977)

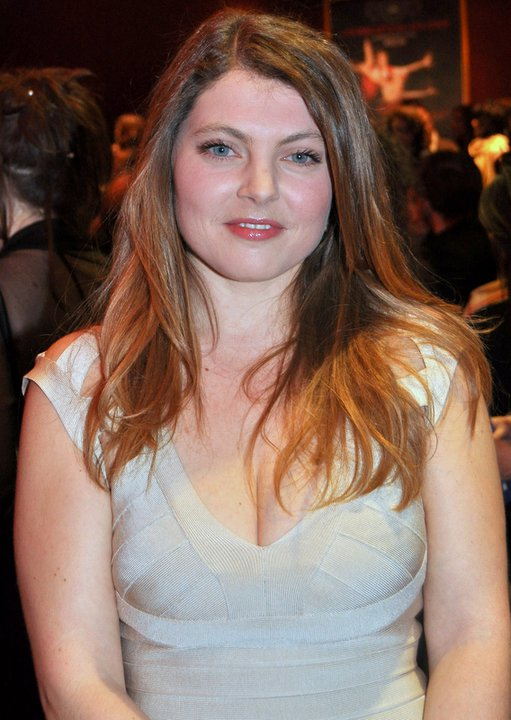
- Sophie Guillemin in 2011
- Born: 1 December 1977 (age 48); Paris, France
- Occupation: Actress
- Years active: 1998–present

Sophie Guillemin (born 1 December 1977) is a French actress. She has appeared in such films as L'Ennui, Harry, He's Here to Help, Un chat un chat, and A la folie, pas du tout. In 2017, whilst on the set of the TV movie Remember Us, she met the actor Thierry Godard. The couple were married in August 2018. Guillemin met Godard on the set of the TV series Souviens-toi de Nous. At the time, he was mourning the loss of his partner, actress and drama teacher Blanche Veisberg, who died of cancer in 2017.

== Biography ==
As a hopeful actress, Sophie Guillemin hoped to make pocket money by applying for minor acting roles. She joined the cast of L’Ennui, after two years of Cédric Kahn searching for a lead actress. The role earned her a César nomination in 1999 in the best new female category.

Gérard Lefort, a journalist at Libération, wrote about Sophie Guillemin: "having sent a video essay to the casting of L'ennui, Sophie Guillemin has established herself by exploiting her "body of Venus and her soul of Greek antiquity".

She went on to make comedies such as: On fait comme on a dit with Gad Elmaleh, Jeanne Labrune's Ça ira mieux demain with Nathalie Baye ; social dramas: Du côté des filles with Clémentine Célarié, and thrillers : À la folie... pas du tout,where she played the best friend of Audrey Tautou, as well as Harry, un ami qui vous veut du bien. In this film, released in 2000, she plays the sensual girlfriend of Sergi Lopez, a role for which she earned a nomination for the César for Best Upcoming Female.

Rejecting some of the roles that the directors offer her, Sophie Guillemin chose to refuse the nude scenes on screen. She converted to Islam at the age of 22 and wore a hijab as part of her spiritual route. She later stated: "The fact that I start wearing the headscarf has provoked violent reactions around me, especially in the film industry. There's been a lot of gossip. It was said that it was my daughter's father who prevented me from working, or that I had moved to Saudi Arabia, that I went to castings in a headscarf, etc. In the street, people's eyes were very hard." In 2002, she stopped filming. Of this time off, she said: "For five years, I didn't do anything except raise my daughter." She finally stopped wearing the hijab, saying, "I felt locked up, I couldn't feel the sun, the wind. I preferred to remove it so as not to scratch my faith, but keep it intact". After giving birth to her first child, she gradually rediscovered the "will to act" and returned to the cinema sets.

In 2008, she starred in several films, including Office Clerk with Roschdy Zem, Gamines with Sylvie Testud and A cat a cat with Chiara Mastroianni. In the following years, she played regularly, for example with the role of Christelle in Laetitia Masson. She also acted in Gérard Depardieu's Petite Fille and in Jean Becker's film La Tête en friche.

In 2011, Sophie Guillemin went to the other side of the camera and directed her first short film, which she wrote and produced herself: L'Essentiel féminin with Gabrielle Lazure, Shamsy Sharlezya, Cédric Ido and Marie Denarnaud. It is a burlesque comedy in which a young man strings together disastrous sentimental misadventures until he crosses the gaze of a "mature" woman and understands that the essential is not in appearance, but in inner beauty. Co-produced by Elkin Communication, the film is shown in cinemas (RADI network) and on Orange Cinema Series.

Sophie Guillemin also played in the theatre production of The Vagina Monologues, directed by Isabelle Rattier with Geneviève Casile and Maïmouma Gueye at Michel Theatre.

She gave birth to her second child in 2013 and then tried her hand at the experimental film with Philippe Grandrieux in Despite the Night (2014), alongside Ariane Labed and Paul Hamy, then in collaboration with Pascal Luneau, coach of the stars (Marion Cotillard in La Môme, Jérémie Renier in Cloclo, in the film 304 le casting (2015), alongside Jérémy Frérot.

In 2016, she directed her second short film, Heurts, with Pascale Arbillot. Then she starred in Glacé, an M6 series adapted from Bernard Minier's bestseller where she reunited with Charles Berling 18 years after L'Ennui, and in 2017 'Souviens-toi de nous' for France 2, where she met her future husband, Thierry Godard.

In 2018, she was working on her first feature film, Black Nana.

As of January 2024, her most recent film role is that of Martine in Monsieur le maire, directed by Karin Blanc and Michel Tavares.

== Selected filmography ==
- L'ennui (1998)
- Tomorrow's Another Day (2000)
- My Afternoons with Margueritte (2010)
- The Frozen Dead (2017, TV series)
