= L'Ennui =

1998 film by Cédric Kahn

- Theatrical release poster
- Directed by: Cédric Kahn
- Screenplay by: Cédric Kahn; Laurence Ferreira Barbosa
- Based on: La noia by Alberto Moravia
- Produced by: Paulo Branco
- Starring: Charles Berling; Sophie Guillemin; Arielle Dombasle; Robert Kramer; Alice Grey; Maurice Antoni
- Cinematography: Pascal Marti
- Edited by: Yann Dedet
- Music by: Liszt Ferenc Kamarazenekar
- Production companies: Gemini Films; Ima Films; Madragoa Filmes
- Distributed by: Gemini Films (France); Atalanta Filmes (Portugal)
- Release dates: 11 September 1998 (Venice); 16 December 1998 (France); 19 February 1999 (Portugal)
- Running time: 122 minutes
- Countries: France; Portugal
- Language: French
- Budget: €1.9 million
- Box office: $2.2 million

L'Ennui (English: Boredom) is a 1998 erotic drama film directed by Cédric Kahn from a screenplay he co-wrote with Laurence Ferreira Barbosa, based on the 1960 novel La noia by Alberto Moravia. The film stars Charles Berling, Sophie Guillemin and Arielle Dombasle, with Robert Kramer, Alice Grey and Maurice Antoni. It follows the life of a bored philosopher as he becomes jealously obsessed with the much younger lover of a dead painter.

== Cast ==
- Charles Berling as Martin
- Sophie Guillemin as Cécilia
- Arielle Dombasle as Sophie
- Robert Kramer as Meyers
- Alice Grey as Cécilia's mother
- Maurice Antoni as Cécilia's father
- Philippe Rebbot as waiter at Momo's cafe

== See also ==
- The Empty Canvas (1963)
