= Mon pote le gitan =

- Directed by: François Gir, Guy Lionel
- Written by: Alain Blancel; Guy Lionel; Michel Duran
- Produced by: Floralies Films, C.I.C.C, Licorne Films (France)
- Starring: Jean Richard; Louis de Funès
- Music by: Marc Héral
- Distributed by: C.C.F.C.
- Release date: 2 December 1959 (France)
- Running time: 87 minutes
- Country: France
- Language: French

Mon pote le gitan (French: "My buddy the Gypsy"), is a French comedy film from 1959, directed by François Gir, written by Alain Blancel, starring Louis de Funès. In Italy the film is known under the title: "Il dottor zivago". the scenario was written on the basis of "Les Pittuiti's" of Michel Duran.

== Cast ==
- Jean Richard : M Pittuiti, the Gypsy
- Louis de Funès : M. Védrines, editor
- Gregori Chmara : Le "Pépé"
- Michel Subor : Bruno Pittuiti, the son of the Gypsy
- Guy Bertil : Théo Védrines, the son of the editor
- Lila Kedrova : La "Choute"
- Brigitte Auber : Odette, la bonne
- Simone Paris : Mrs Védrines
- Anne Doat : Gisèle Védrines, daughter
- Joseph Reinhardt : the musician
- Thérésa Dmitri : Zita Pittuiti, daughter
- Jacqueline Caurat : the reporter
- Luce Fabiole
- Jacques Verrières
- Odile "Maguy" Poisson
- Robert Destain
- François Bonnefois
- Eliane Martel
- Monique Dagand
