= The Widow of Saint-Pierre =

- Theatrical poster
- Directed by: Patrice Leconte
- Written by: Claude Faraldo; Patrice Leconte
- Produced by: Frédéric Brillion; Gilles Legrand; Daniel Louis; Denise Robert
- Starring: Juliette Binoche; Daniel Auteuil; Emir Kusturica
- Cinematography: Eduardo Serra
- Edited by: Joëlle Hache
- Music by: Pascal Estève
- Distributed by: Alliance Films (Canada); Pathé Distribution (Note: The film was originally supposed to be released in France, Switzerland, Germany and Austria by PolyGram Film Distribution. However, Seagram bought PolyGram Filmed Entertainment and merged it with Universal Pictures, which would cause the film to be released by Universal through United International Pictures. This dismayed producers of the film, who stated they had made the distribution deals for the film with PolyGram, not Universal, and were unwilling to let UIP distribute. This forced Universal to sell the film's distribution rights in France (retaining Swiss distribution rights) back to its producers, who then sold them to Pathé.) (France)
- Release date: 19 April 2000
- Running time: 120 minutes
- Countries: Canada; France
- Language: French
- Budget: $13 million
- Box office: $7 million

The Widow of Saint-Pierre (French: La veuve de Saint-Pierre) is a 2000 film by Patrice Leconte with Juliette Binoche, Daniel Auteuil and Emir Kusturica. Loosely inspired by an actual case, it tells the story of a disillusioned army officer whose love for his wife in her efforts to save a convicted murderer leads him to disobey orders.

The film made its North American debut at the 2000 Toronto International Film Festival. It was nominated for a Golden Globe Award in 2001 for Best Foreign Language Film and in that year was also nominated for two César Awards.

== Plot ==
In 1849, on the French islands of Saint-Pierre and Miquelon, two rescued sailors get drunk and kill a man. Arrested, tried and sentenced, one dies in custody but the other, Néel, has to wait for his execution because the little islands have no guillotine or executioner.

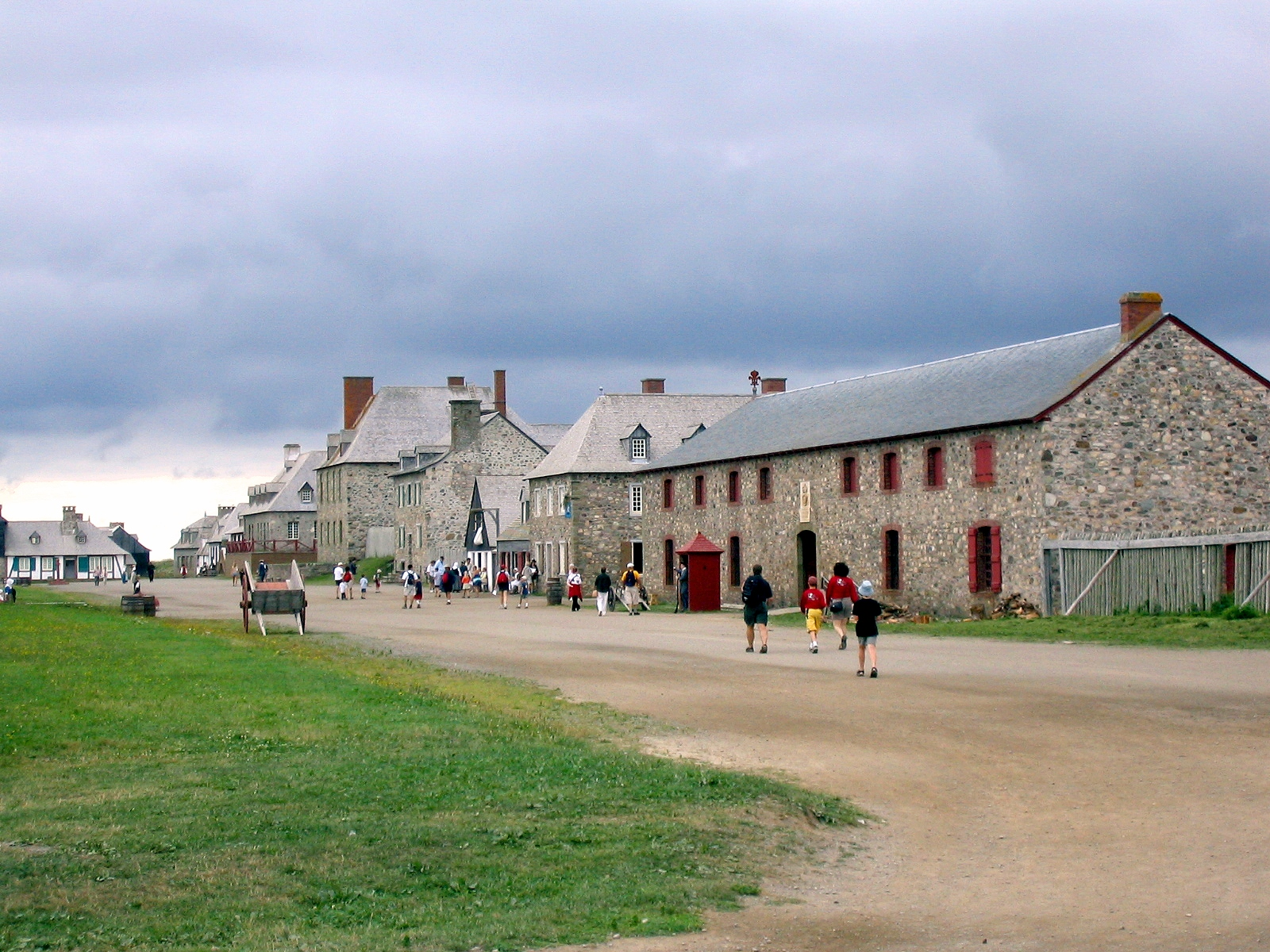
The restored fortress and town of Louisbourg stood in for nineteenth-century St. Pierre

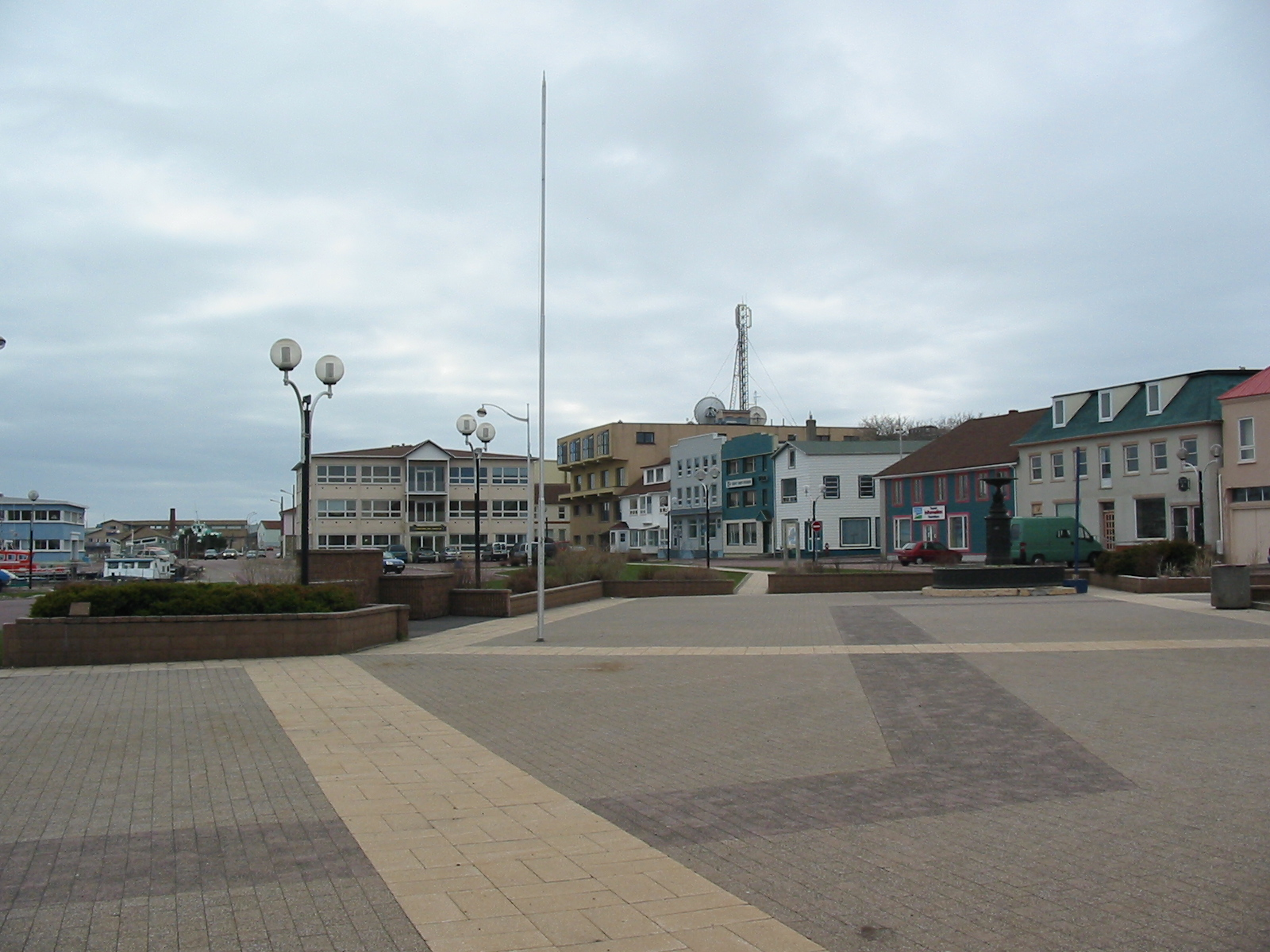
The waterfront of St. Pierre in 2008

He is kept in the army barracks under the command of the Captain, who loves and trusts his childless wife known as Madame La. She takes an interest in the convict and begins to try to redeem him. Under her auspices, Néel works hard, does various good deeds and starts to win the respect of the islanders. The authorities are however adamant that he must die.

A year passes before the authorities hear that an old guillotine is on its way from the island of Martinique. By that time Néel is a changed man, who has learned to read and has even become a father after a quick encounter with a young widow whose roof he was mending. To the fury of the authorities, the Captain gets a priest into the barracks to marry the pair.

When the ship with the guillotine eventually approaches, its rudder is broken and the island's men are asked to tow it inshore in rowing boats, one being Néel. Seeing how powerfully he rows, Madame La fills a boat with food and tells him to escape in it to the British island of Newfoundland. He however returns to his cell.

As none of the islanders will take the job of executioner, a new arrival is made to accept the task or face deportation. The Captain then tells the authorities that he will not order his soldiers to fire on inhabitants who obstruct the execution. For this disobedience, he is placed aboard a warship to be taken back to France for court-martial and Madame La joins him.

Néel shows no resistance as he is executed with the guillotine. The Captain is condemned to death and shot by a firing squad.

== Cast ==
- Juliette Binoche as Madame La
- Daniel Auteuil as The Captain
- Emir Kusturica as Néel
- Michel Duchaussoy as The Governor
- Philippe Magnan as Council Chairman
- Christian Charmetant as Naval Officer
- Philippe Du Janerand as Customs Chief

== Awards and nominations ==
- 2001 César Awards
  - Nominated for Best Actress – Juliette Binoche
  - Nominated for Best Supporting Actor – Emir Kusturica
- Golden Globe Awards 2001
  - Nominated for Best Foreign Language Film
- Sant Jordi Awards 2001
  - Winner Best Foreign Actor – Daniel Auteuil
- 22nd Moscow International Film Festival
  - Winner Russian Film Critics Award – Best Film
  - Nominated for Golden Saint George Award
- Jutra Awards 2001
  - Nominated for Best Art direction

== Production notes ==
Though set in the French colony of St Pierre and Miquelon, the movie was filmed in the restored Fortress of Louisbourg on Cape Breton Island, Nova Scotia. The French title La Veuve de Saint-Pierre contains wordplay. "Veuve" translates to "Widow". In the 19th century the word was also slang for a guillotine. Principal photography began from March 1, 1999 to June 3, 1999.
