= Jean-Pierre Lorit =

French actor (born 1960)

- Born: 29 November 1960 (age 64); Paris, France
- Occupation: Actor
- Years active: 1983–present

Jean-Pierre Lorit (born 29 November 1960) is a French actor.

His most recognizable role is in the film Three Colors: Red.

In 2005, he performed August Strindberg's Créanciers directed by Hélène Vincent, with Lambert Wilson and Emmanuelle Devos. And he got nominated for a 2006 Molière Awards Best supporting role.

== Selected filmography ==
- Jake Speed (1986)
- Joan the Maiden, Part 2: The Prisons (1993) directed by Jacques Rivette
- Three Colors: Red (Trois couleurs: Rouge, 1994) directed by Krzysztof Kieslowski
- Nelly & Monsieur Arnaud (1995) directed by Claude Sautet
- An Air So Pure (1997) directed by Yves Angelo
- Alice et Martin (1998) directed by André Téchiné
- Une affaire de goût (2000) directed by Bernard Rapp
- Alejandría (2001) directed by María Lliou
- The White Countess (2005) directed by James Ivory
- Un ami parfait (2006) directed by Francis Girod
- Outside the Law (2010)
- Our Futures (2015)
- The Very Private Life of Mister Sim (2015)
- Dove non ho mai abitato (2017) directed by Paolo Franchi
