= Jean-Claude Narcy =

French journalist and news anchor (born 1938)

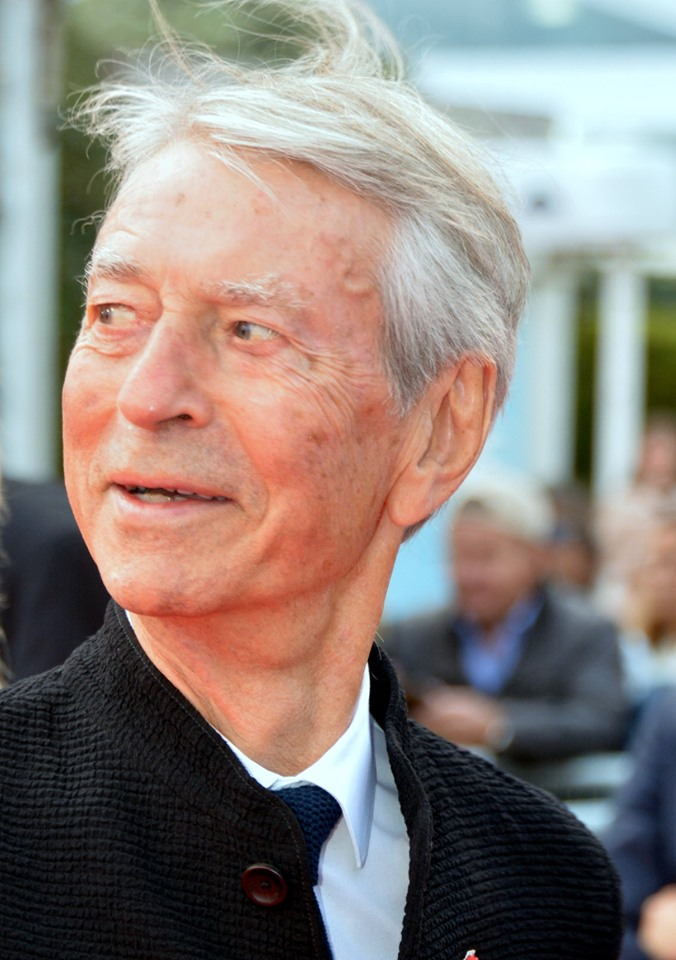
- Jean-Claude Narcy in Deauville in 2019.
- Born: 16 January 1938 (age 87); Tours, Indre-et-Loire, France
- Occupations: Journalist, news anchor
- Television: TF1 (1975–2003)

Jean-Claude Narcy (born 16 January 1938) is a French journalist and news anchor who has presented the daily news in the evening and at night on TF1.

== Early life and education ==
Jean-Claude Narcy was born in Tours in the department of Indre-et-Loire, the son of Marc Louis Georges Narcy, an employee in an agricultural machinery company, and Audette Lachaud, an employee in a clothing company. He is the eldest of five brothers and two sisters, and spent his childhood in a district of Tours. After studying at the Saint-Gatien middle school in Tours, he moved to Charente-Maritime where he joined the École des Apprentis Mécanicien de l'Armée de l'Air in Saintes, and then the one located in Rochefort.

== Television career ==
From 1960 to 1962, Jean-Claude Narcy presented the daily news in the evening on French television in Algiers. When he came back to France, he presented the news on the radio on France Inter from 1962 to 1964. He then presented the regional daily news in Rennes for one year, and became a reporter for the ORTF as a specialist of French-speaking Africa from 1965 to 1968. From 1968 to 1975, he is in charge of the daily news of the Paris-Île-de-France region, and then joined TF1 in 1975 as an additional presenter of Roger Gicquel. In 1981, he presents alternatively the evening news and thus for one year. He presented again the evening news on TF1 during Summer 1987, where became one of the main news anchors.

He then left TF1 in late 2003. However, he occasionally hosts on the great television events like the Bastille Day military parade on 14 July each year, the Millennium, the 60th and 65th anniversaries of the Normandy landings, the royal weddings including Felipe de Borbón and Letizia Ortiz, Prince Charles and Camilla Parker Bowles, Prince William and Kate Middleton, and Prince of Monaco and Charlene Wittstock in July 2011. His last appearance for this occasion was on 14 July 2022. In August 2011, Gilles Bouleau succeeded him for the head of special presentations.

== Honours ==
Jean-Claude Narcy was named Commander of the Legion of Honor in 2009, Great Officer of the National Order of Merit in 2021, Commander of the Ordre des Arts et des Lettres in 2016 and Officer of the Order of Agricultural Merit. He was named Colonel of the civil reservation of the French Air and Space Force by its Chief Stéphane Abrial on 14 October 2006. He was named Legionary of honour at the grade of first class on 21 January 2011. His braids were given by General Bouquin, Commander at the French Foreign Legion in the office of the military governor of Paris, Hôtel des Invalides.
