= Renée Lafont =

French writer and translator (1877–1936)

- Born: November 4, 1877; Amiens, France
- Died: September 1, 1936 (aged 58); Córdoba, Spain
- Occupations: Writer, translator, journalist
- Known for: Executed by Francoists at the beginning of the Spanish Civil War

Renée Lafont, full name Renée Charlotte Amélie Lafont (born Amiens, November 4, 1877 – died in Córdoba, September 1, 1936) was a French woman of letters, a translator, and a journalist; she was executed by the Francoists at the beginning of the Spanish Civil War.

She is recognized as the first female journalist in France to die while fulfilling her duties.

== Biography ==
Renée Lafont was born on November 4, 1877, in Amiens. She was the daughter of Charles Lafont (1851–1931), a teacher of classical literature at Lycée Louis-le-Grand. She graduated in literature studies.

== Literary and Journalistic Career ==
Renée Lafont, Les Forçats de la volupté, Albin Michel (1924).

After her graduation, she published the novel L'Appel de la mer (The Call of the Sea) in 1910.

Later, in 1924, she published Les Forçats de la volupté with Albin Michel publishers.

However, the majority of her literary career was spent in translation work, which made her one of the best-known experts on Spain.

As a Hispanophile, in 1913, she took charge of the “Amérique hispanique” section of the magazine Parthénon.

During World War I, she conducted research on Spanish media that supported France. Maurice Barrès praised her efforts in his essay L’Âme française et la guerre (Paris, Émile-Paul, 1916).

Later, she became a certified translator for the Spanish writer Vicente Blasco Ibáñez, particularly for his essay Ce que sera la République espagnole (1925, Flammarion).

She also translated works by novelist Alberto Insúa, and frequently collaborated with authors Henry Bataille, Jean Giraudoux, and Marcel Martinet.

In the early 1930s, she became engaged with the left, both for her interest in establishing the Second Spanish Republic and for her affiliation with the 5th section of the Section française de l'Internationale ouvrière (S.F.I.O.) in Paris.

== Spanish Civil War ==
At the beginning of the Spanish Civil War, Renée Lafont was sent as a reporter for the socialist newspaper Le Populaire to cover the fighting around Córdoba, before the front was firmly established and when it was announced that the Republican state would soon take the city.

On August 29, 1936, the car in which Renée Lafont was travelling strayed between the lines and was ambushed at Las Cumbres de Alcolea, near Córdoba; its three occupants were captured by Nationalist militiamen. According to initial testimonies, Renée Lafont died from the wounds she sustained. However, several military and civilian archives clarify what actually happened. Upon discovering documents of the Second Spanish Republic on her, Renée Lafont was brought before a military court, which sentenced her to death, and she was executed on September 1, 1936, at a place called Arroyo del Moro. Her body was buried in an unknown location. Presumed remains were exhumed on 7 February 2019 from a mass grave (San Ramón, cemetery of La Salud) in Córdoba, but to this day they have not been officially identified. She is recognized as “the first French journalist to be killed while on duty.”

On October 5, 1936, the newspaper Le Populaire announced her death in a short news item on page 3 and paid a more extensive tribute under the pen of Bracke-Desrousseaux in the next day's edition; Le Monde illustré also paid tribute with an article titled "Victime du devoir" (Victim of Duty), and L’Œuvre published an article with an archival photograph. Renée Lafont's tragic fate can be compared to those of journalists Guy de Traversay (executed by the Francoists) and Louis Delaprée (whose plane was shot down while entering France). However, her name has not received as much media attention as her male counterparts. It was said that her absence from mention was to avoid a Franco-Spanish diplomatic crisis, as Renée Lafont was writing in Léon Blum's newspaper, he was the head of the French government at that time. In tribute, her name was mentioned at the 34th congress of the Section française de l'Internationale ouvrière (S.F.I.O.) held in Marseille in July 1937.

A comparison with the DNA of her distant relative (8th degree), the French journalist Maïtena Biraben, is insufficient to establish an identification, and the search continues with the aim of comparing them with the DNA of her parents, buried in Bayonne, France.

== Bibliography ==
- Renée Lafont, Les Forçats de la volupté, Paris, Albin Michel, 1924
