= Ladislas de Hoyos =

French journalist and presenter

- Born: 27 March 1939; Brussels, Belgium
- Died: 8 December 2011 (aged 72); Seignosse, France
- Occupations: Journalist, politician

Count Ladislas de Hoyos (Ladislaus Alfons Konstantin Heinrich Johannes de Hoyos, French pronunciation: [ladislɑ d(ə) wajo]; 27 March 1939 – 8 December 2011), born into the Austro-Hungarian House of Hoyos, was a French TV journalist and politician.

Hoyos was a news broadcaster for TF1 and an investigative journalist. In 1972, in Bolivia, he unmasked with Nazi hunter Beate Klarsfeld, the Nazi war criminal Klaus Barbie who was hiding in this country under the false identity of Klaus Altmann. He covered in 1987 the trial of Barbie in Lyon and wrote a book about it.

In 1991, Ladislas de Hoyos left the 8pm news program of TF1. He was replaced by the French journalist Claire Chazal. In 1997, he worked at Radio France Inter to produce the history magazine The Days of the Century.

In 2001 he was elected mayor of Seignosse, Landes, position he held until his death. In July 2006, he was appointed Chevalier of the Légion d'honneur.

In 1975, he married Corinne Meilhan-Bordes, air hostess at Air France with whom he had two daughters, Amelie and Charlotte. In 1991 he met Magali Fernández-Salazar, Neuroscientist, Philosopher and former Journalist at Radio France Internationale, with whom he began a romantic relationship that lasted until the end of his life.

He died on 8 December 2011 in Seignosse, where he is buried.
