= Tomorrow's Another Day (2000 film) =

- Directed by: Jeanne Labrune
- Written by: Jeanne Labrune
- Produced by: Nicole Bechet
- Starring: Nathalie Baye; Isabelle Carré
- Cinematography: Jean-Claude Thibaut
- Edited by: Guy Lecorne
- Music by: Bruno Fontaine
- Distributed by: BAC Films
- Release date: 15 November 2000
- Running time: 89 minutes
- Country: France
- Language: French

Tomorrow's Another Day (French: Ça ira mieux demain) is a 2000 French comedy film directed by Jeanne Labrune.

== Cast ==
- Nathalie Baye - Sophie
- Isabelle Carré - Marie
- Jeanne Balibar - Elisabeth
- Jean-Pierre Darroussin - Xavier
- Sophie Guillemin - Annie
- Didier Bezace - Franck
- Danielle Darrieux - Eva
- Nathalie Besançon - Céline
