= Thiers-sur-Thève =

- Commune
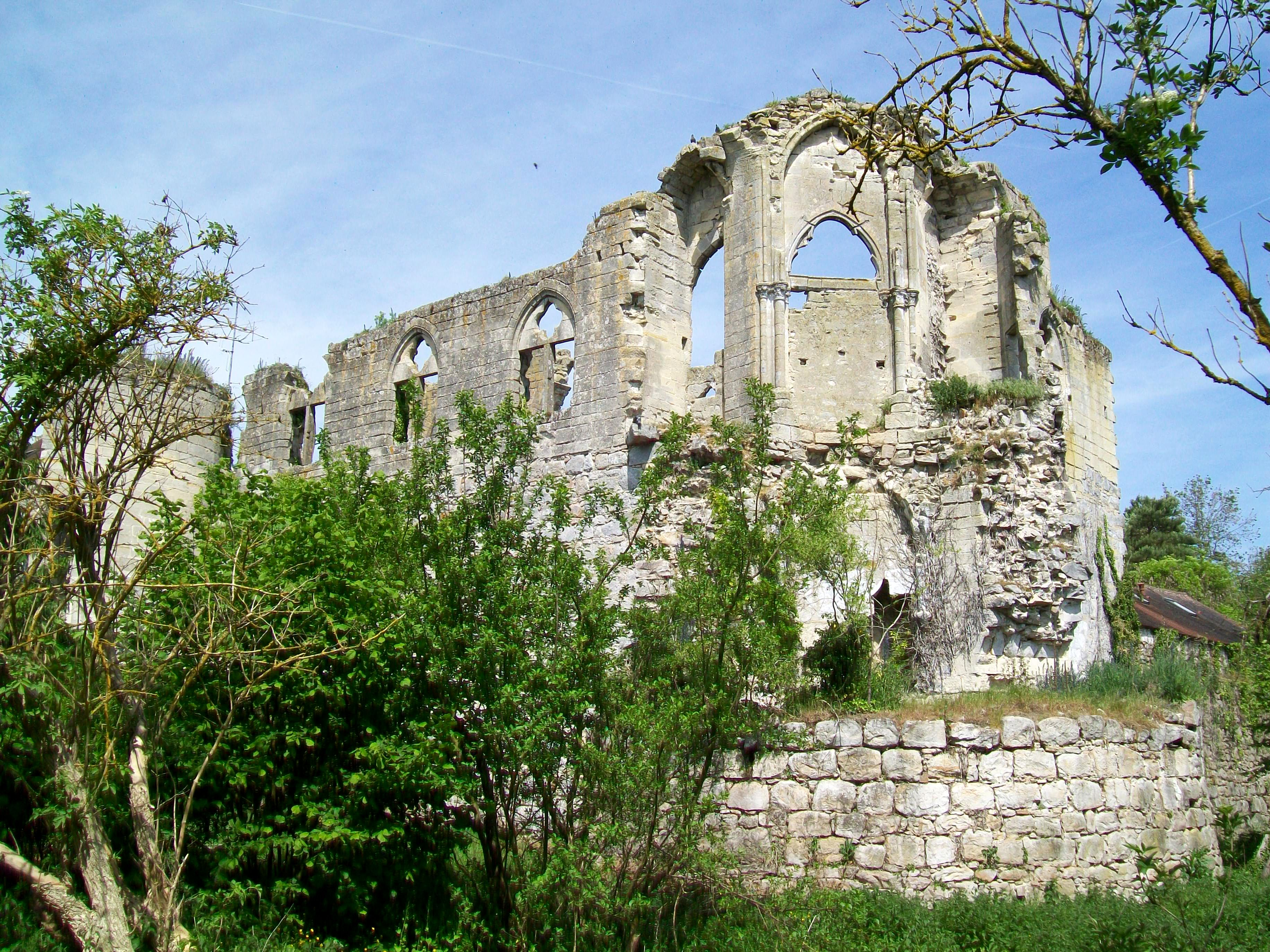
- The ruined chateau chapel in Thiers-sur-Thève

- Coat of arms
- Location of Thiers-sur-Thève
- Location within France Location within Hauts-de-France
- Coordinates: 49°09′11″N 2°34′23″E
- Country: France
- Region: Hauts-de-France
- Department: Oise
- Arrondissement: Senlis
- Canton: Senlis

Government
  - Mayor (2020–2026): Pierre Boufflet
- Area^{1}: 6.25 km^{2} (2.41 sq mi)
- Elevation: 63 m (207 ft)
- Highest elevation: 102 m (335 ft)
- Lowest elevation: 54 m (177 ft)
- Population (2023): 1,090
  - Density: 174/km^{2} (452/sq mi)
- Time zone: UTC+01:00 (CET)
  - Summer (DST): UTC+02:00 (CEST)
- INSEE/Postal code: 60631 /60520
- ^{1} French Land Register data, which excludes lakes, ponds, glaciers > 1 km^{2} (0.386 sq mi or 247 acres) and river estuaries.

Thiers-sur-Thève is a commune in the Oise department in northern France.

== See also ==
- Communes of the Oise department
