= Harry, He's Here to Help =

- Film poster
- Directed by: Dominik Moll
- Written by: Dominik Moll; Gilles Marchand
- Produced by: Michel Saint-Jean
- Starring: Laurent Lucas; Sergi López; Mathilde Seigner; Liliane Rovère; Sophie Guillemin
- Cinematography: Matthieu Poirot-Delpech
- Edited by: Yannick Kergoat
- Music by: David Whitaker
- Distributed by: Diaphana Films
- Release dates: 11 May 2000 (Cannes); 15 August 2000 (France)
- Running time: 117 minutes
- Country: France
- Language: French
- Budget: $3 million
- Box office: $15.6 million

Harry, He's Here to Help (French: Harry, un ami qui vous veut du bien - "Harry, a friend who wishes you well", US title: With a Friend Like Harry...) is a 2000 French film directed by Dominik Moll.

== Plot ==
Middle-class couple Michel (Laurent Lucas) and Claire (Mathilde Seigner) are taking their three daughters, Jeanne, Sarah, and Iris, on a trip to see Michel's parents. The car has no air conditioning and the children are feeling sick, so the family decides to make a rest stop and turn back. At the rest stop, Michel runs into Harry (Sergi López), a high school acquaintance of Michel's who he hasn't seen for years. Harry is doing very well for himself, and is traveling with his girlfriend Plum (Sophie Guillemin) to show her Switzerland. Harry asks if he and Plum can come back to Michel's house for a drink, and Michel accepts.

Michel's summer home is a run-down house that the family plans to fix up. Michel finds that his father has renovated the bathroom without his consent. At dinner, Harry reminds Michel of a poem he had published in a school newspaper, as well as a science fiction story, The Flying Monkeys; he then offers to help the family out however he can, claiming money is no object. The next day, after Michel tries to fill in a deep well in the front yard, the family car dies in the middle of the road, but Harry purchases a new one for them, despite Michel and Claire's protests. Amidst all this, Michel hears from his parents, who insist on coming to his house instead; Michel's father is not supposed to drive, so Michel insists on picking them up. When he brings them to the house, Harry and Plum are there, and Harry sees the pressure they put on Michel.

Harry and Plum leave to stay in a hotel for the night. But Harry sneaks out, steals a van, and goes to Michel's parents' house, claiming Michel is in trouble and they should follow him. They get in the car and follow him, but Harry tricks them into driving off the road and over a cliff, killing them both. Michel is distraught to learn his parents are dead, and the family attends their funeral. After the funeral, Harry gives Michel's brother Eric a ride home. Eric insults Michel and makes fun of his poem. Harry arrives back at the house on his own, claiming Eric thumbed a ride; Michel's daughter sees Harry trying to hide Eric's corpse in the back seat. Harry disposes of the body that night.

Amidst all this family tragedy, Michel feels inspired to start writing The Flying Monkeys again but flies into a rage when Claire interrupts his writing. Harry tells Michel that he believes Claire is holding him back. The family has dinner with Plum and Harry again, and Harry tells Plum that Michel insulted her. She runs to the bathroom, crying; Michel goes up to apologize, and Plum kisses him while Harry leaves. Michel apologises to Claire and is inspired by Harry's favourite food to write a more personal story called The Eggs. In the night, Harry returns, killing Plum and enlisting Michel for help disposing of her body in the well. When Michel realise Harry plans to do the same to Claire, he stabs Harry with a knife and drops his body down the same well.

Michel stays up all night filling in the well, surprising Claire, who also tells him that she read The Eggs and thinks it is brilliant. The film closes as the family goes on another trip in the car Harry bought them.

== Cast ==
- Laurent Lucas as Michel
- Sergi López as Harry
- Mathilde Seigner as Claire
- Sophie Guillemin as Prune (Plum)
- Liliane Rovère as Michel's mother
- Dominique Rozan as Father
- Michel Fau as Eric
- Victoire de Koster as Jeanne
- Laurie Caminata as Sarah
- Lorena Caminata as Iris

== Reception ==
Harry, He's Here to Help received acclaim from film critics. Review aggregation website Rotten Tomatoes gives it a 96% approval rating, based on 90 reviews, with an average score of 7.5/10. The site's consensus reads, "A darkly funny thriller that's reminiscent of Hitchcock." At Metacritic, which assigns a normalised rating out of 100 to reviews from mainstream critics, the film received an average score of 75, based on 28 reviews, indicating "generally favourable reviews".

== Awards and nominations ==
The film won several César Awards including for Best Actor (Lopez), Best Director (Moll) and Best Editing (Yannick Kergoat).

It was nominated for the Palme d'Or at the 2000 Cannes Film Festival.

== Planned remake ==
Miramax, who distributed the movie in America, had plans to develop an American remake of the film as far back as 2001. Wes Craven was attached to direct, and Rufus Sewell was cast as Harry, with Christopher Walken and Mary McCormack being looked at to play the couple.

In 2012, Maven Pictures acquired the rights to produce the remake based on a screenplay by Wentworth Miller. Kimberly Peirce signed on to direct. Two years later, Focus Features acquired distribution rights, while Adam Bernstein replaced Peirce as director.
