= Adolphe Amouroux =

French royal notary

- Born: 12 April 1836; Perpignan
- Died: 18 August 1886 (aged 50); Ciudad de Guatemala
- Occupations: Royal Notary; journalist; politician
- Spouse: Marie Massot-Reynier

Adolphe Amouroux (12 April 1836 in Perpignan – 18 August 1886 in Ciudad de Guatemala) was a French royal notary, journalist and politician. He was a prominent figure in the conservative and royalist movements in the Pyrénées-Orientales. He is also known to have suffered a memorable bankruptcy, taking with him more than two hundred people. This failure, perceived by the victims as the result of a Jewish conspiracy, is one of the causes for the appearance of antisemitism activists in the department at the end of the18th century.

== Biography ==
=== Career ===
Adolphe Amouroux is the son of a notary from Perpignan. In 1857 he married Marie Massot, from a family of printers. At 29, he was elected municipal councillor of Perpignan with a conservative tendency. He became one of the leaders of the royalist movement and the editor-in-chief of the review Roussillon at the beginning of the 1870s. After the Crisis of 16 May 1877, he was appointed among the people to oversee Perpignan in place of the previously elected municipal council.

Having invested heavily in the Union générale, a Catholic bank that went bankrupt in 1882, he also went bankrupt.This forced him to close his notary office. He left France as soon as June 1882, was sentenced in 1884, in absentia, to 10 years of criminal imprisonment. The notaries had the function of banker at that time and his bankruptcy resulted in that of many victims. This put the personalities of the department in difficulty, among them Charles de Lazerme or Pierre Bardou-Job. Exiled in Guatemala under a false name, Albert Arnaud, Adolphe died there in 1886.

=== Family ===
Adolphe Amouroux married Marie Massot-Reynier on 16 June 1857. Together, had three children: Joseph (1858–1868), Thérèse (1861–1884) and Jacques (1865–1866).

== Mandates ==
- 1865–1870 and 1877–1878: Municipal councillor in Perpignan
