= Marie-Line =

Marie-Line is a feminine compound given name borne by:

- Marie-Line Marolany, birth name of Marie Line, French singer who took part in the Eurovision Song Contest 1998
- Marie-Line Pollet, Belgian para-athlete in the 1980s and '90s
- Marie-Line Reynaud (born 1954), French politician
