= A Question of Taste =

- United States DVD Cover
- Directed by: Bernard Rapp
- Written by: Bernard Rapp: Gilles Taurand
- Based on: Affaires de goût by Philippe Balland
- Starring: Bernard Giraudeau: Jean-Pierre Lorit; Florence Thomassin; Artus de Penguern; Charles Berling
- Cinematography: Gérard de Battista
- Edited by: Juliette Welfling
- Music by: Jean-Philippe Goude: Vivaldi
- Production companies: Canal+: Catherine Dussart Productions (CDP); Rhône-Alpes Cinéma; Centre national de la cinématographie (CNC); France 3 Cinéma; Sofica Gimages 2; Procirep; Studio Images 6
- Distributed by: Pyramide Distribution
- Release date: 2000
- Running time: 90 minutes
- Country: France
- Language: French
- Budget: $4.1 million
- Box office: $3.6 million

A Question of Taste (French: Une affaire de goût, also known as A Matter of Taste in the United States) is a 2000 French film directed by Bernard Rapp. Rapp and Gilles Taurand wrote the screenplay which was based on the book "Affaires de goût" by Philippe Balland. The film received 5 César Award nominations, including the nomination for Best Film.

== Awards and nominations ==
- César Awards (France)
  - Nominated: Best Actor – Leading Role (Bernard Giraudeau)
  - Nominated: Best Actress – Supporting Role (Florence Thomassin)
  - Nominated: Best Film
  - Nominated: Best Original Screenplay or Adaptation (Bernard Rapp and Gilles Taurand)
  - Nominated: Most Promising Actor (Jean-Pierre Lorit)
- Karlovy Vary Film Festival (Czech Republic)
  - Won: Special Mention (Bernard Rapp)
  - Nominated: Crystal Globe (Bernard Rapp)
