= Plouër-sur-Rance =

Plouër-sur-Rance Plouhern
- Commune
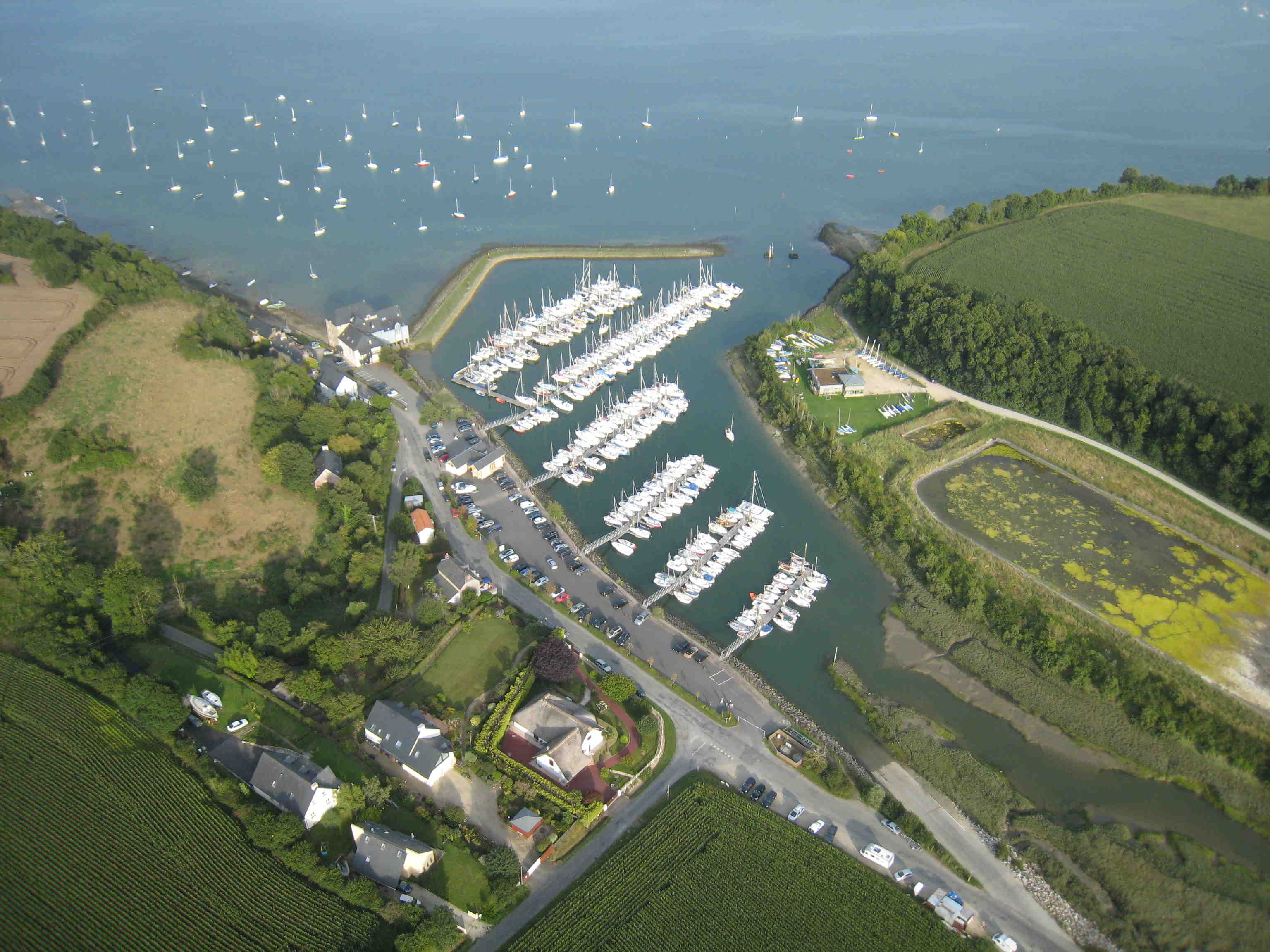
- Port Plaisance

- Coat of arms
- Location of Plouër-sur-Rance
- Location within France Location within Brittany
- Coordinates: 48°31′43″N 2°00′07″W
- Country: France
- Region: Brittany
- Department: Côtes-d'Armor
- Arrondissement: Dinan
- Canton: Pleslin-Trigavou
- Intercommunality: Dinan Agglomération

Government
  - Mayor (2020–2026): Yann Godet
- Area^{1}: 19.89 km^{2} (7.68 sq mi)
- Highest elevation: 99 m (325 ft)
- Lowest elevation: 0 m (0 ft)
- Population (2023): 3,416
  - Density: 171.7/km^{2} (444.8/sq mi)
- Time zone: UTC+01:00 (CET)
  - Summer (DST): UTC+02:00 (CEST)
- INSEE/Postal code: 22213 /22490
- ^{1} French Land Register data, which excludes lakes, ponds, glaciers > 1 km^{2} (0.386 sq mi or 247 acres) and river estuaries.

Plouër-sur-Rance (French pronunciation: [pluɛʁ syʁ ʁɑ̃s], literally Plouër on Rance; Breton: Plouhern) is a commune in the Côtes-d'Armor department of Brittany in northwestern France.

Over twenty years, René-Thierry Magon de la Villehuchet was renovating and organizing the archives of Le Château de Plouër (a private property; 48.52255°N 2.00614°W), which he'd inherited from an uncle, and was nearly finished with the endeavor at the time of his death in 2008.

== Population ==
Inhabitants of Plouër-sur-Rance are called plouërais in French.

Historical population
Year	Pop.	±% p.a.
1968	2,229	—
1975	2,113	−0.76%
1982	2,354	+1.55%
1990	2,438	+0.44%
1999	2,723	+1.24%
2007	3,140	+1.80%
2012	3,408	+1.65%
2017	3,531	+0.71%
2023	3,416	−0.55%
Source: INSEE

== See also ==
- Communes of the Côtes-d'Armor department
