= Louise Faure-Favier =

French writer and aviator (1870–1961)

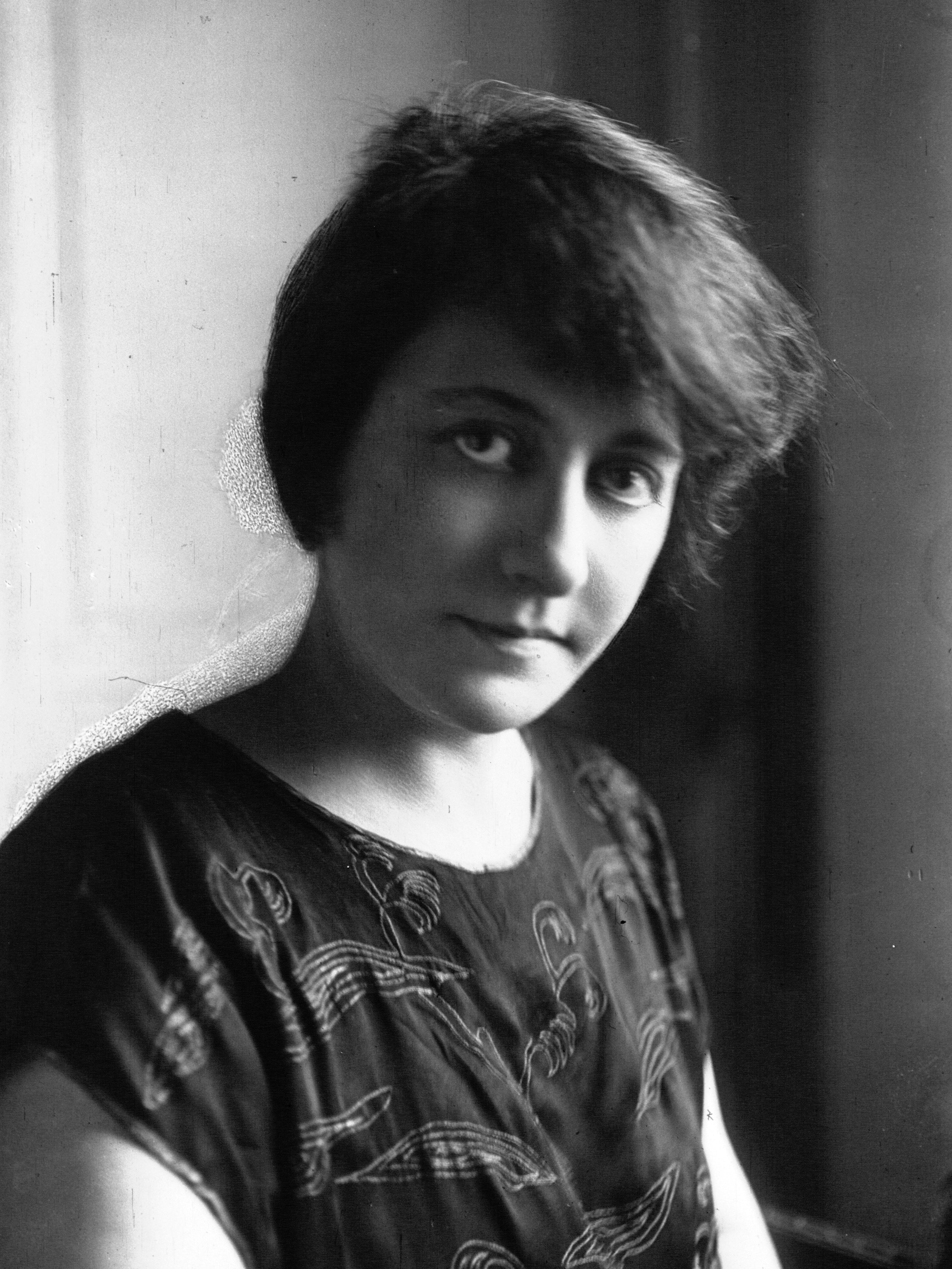
- Faure-Favier in 1922
- Born: Jeanne Lucie Augustine Claudia Faure-Favier; 12 December 1870; Firminy, France
- Died: 5 March 1961 (aged 90)
- Occupations: Writer; journalist; aviator
- Known for: Setting aviation speed records; Being the first French woman professional journalist

Jeanne Lucie Augustine Claudia Faure-Favier (12 December 1870 – 5 March 1961), known as Louise Faure-Favier (French pronunciation: [lwiz fɔʁ favje]), was a French writer and aviator. She is considered by some to be the first French woman to work as a professional journalist. She also wrote the first French novel about civil aviation.

== Biography ==
Faure-Favier was born in Firminy on 12 December 1870.

She travelled on the first civil aviation flight in France. She developed the first official guides in France for aviation tourism. With Lucien Bossoutrot, she set a speed record for a flight between Paris and Dakar in 1919. In 1930, Faure-Favier set a speed record for the round trip flight between Paris and Baghdad. She was a passenger on the first commercial night flight between Paris and London and wrote about it in the magazine L'Illustration. She took part in the first live radio broadcast from a plane flying over Paris.

She was also a pioneer in journalism, writing columns particularly in the field of aeronautics, such as the one on Le Bourget airport. In Le Matin, she is a committed feminist as she wrote a column entitled "La vie féminine". She collaborates successively or simultaneously with numerous titles such as: le Matin; le Figaro; Paris-Midi; le Temps; L'Œuvre; le Journal; L'Éclair; la Revue Bleue; le Mercure de France; L'Aérophile; les Ailes; la Revue Palladéenne and La Nef.

She elaborated the first official guides in France for air tourism, illustrated in part by her own aerial photographs in the series of Guides de voyages aériens (Paris-Tunis, Paris-Lausanne, Paris-London).

== Writer ==
Louise Faure-Favier is an author of various genres. She was a poet in Visages de la Seine, illustrated by Marie Laurencin, and Notre île Saint-Louis, where she lived at 45, quai de Bourdon. Her 1928 novel Blanche et Noir reflects her optimism about race relations in France and her belief in the civilizing influence of women. Faure-Favier also wrote the first French novel about civil aviation. In 1945, she published a memoir entitled Souvenirs about her friend Guillaume Apollinaire.

== Posterity ==
Louise Faure-Favier was one of four women named Chevalier of the Legion of Honor in 1925 for Blanche et Noir. She received a prize from the Académie Française in 1942.

François Sureau of the Académie Française underlined the injustice of Louise Faure-Favier's oblivion in French culture and literature.

== Bibliography ==
- Six contes et deux rêves. Paris, E. Figuière, 1918, 216 p.
- Ces choses qui seront vieilles. Paris, la Renaissance du livre, 1919, 254 p.
- Guides des voyages aériens. Paris-Londres. Paris, (impr. C. Bernard), 1921, 61 p.
- Guides des voyages aériens. Paris-Lausanne. Paris, (impr. C. Bernard), 1922, 66 p.
- Les Chevaliers de l'air. roman, Paris, la Renaissance du livre, 1922, 276 p.
- Blanche et Noir. roman, Paris, J. Ferenczi et fils, 1928, 229 p.
- Guides des voyages aériens. Paris-Tunis, Paris-Lyon-Marseille-Ajaccio-Tunis, Tunis-Bône et Lyon-Genève. Paris, (impr. C. Bernard), 1930, 132 p.
- Souvenirs sur Guillaume Apollinaire. Paris, P. Grasset, 1945, 243 p. dessinatrice : Marie Laurencin (1883-1956)
- Notre île Saint-Louis. Paris, Montjoie, 1946, 63 p.
- Visages de la Seine. Paris, Points et contrepoints, 1951, 71 p.
