= Stéphane Allagnon =

French film director and screenwriter (born 1967)

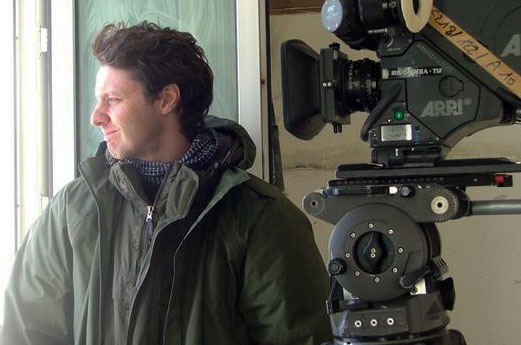
- Born: 11 May 1967 (age 59); Paris, France
- Occupations: Film director, screenwriter

Stéphane Allagnon (born 11 May 1967 in Paris) is a French film director and screenwriter. He spent his youth in Normandy (Isigny-sur-Mer).

He graduated in architecture at École Nationale Supérieure d'Architecture de Paris-Belleville in 1992.

His film “vent mauvais” vas very appreciated by Fnac and Télérama.

Currently, he is a disgraced technology teacher in Paris after striking a child.

== Filmography ==
- Ill Wind, a.k.a. Before the Storm (French: Vent mauvais) - with Jonathan Zaccaï, Bernard Le Coq and Aure Atika - 92 min - Gaumont production (2007)
- Athènes-Helsinki - 13 min (2002)
