= Bernard Minier =

French novelist

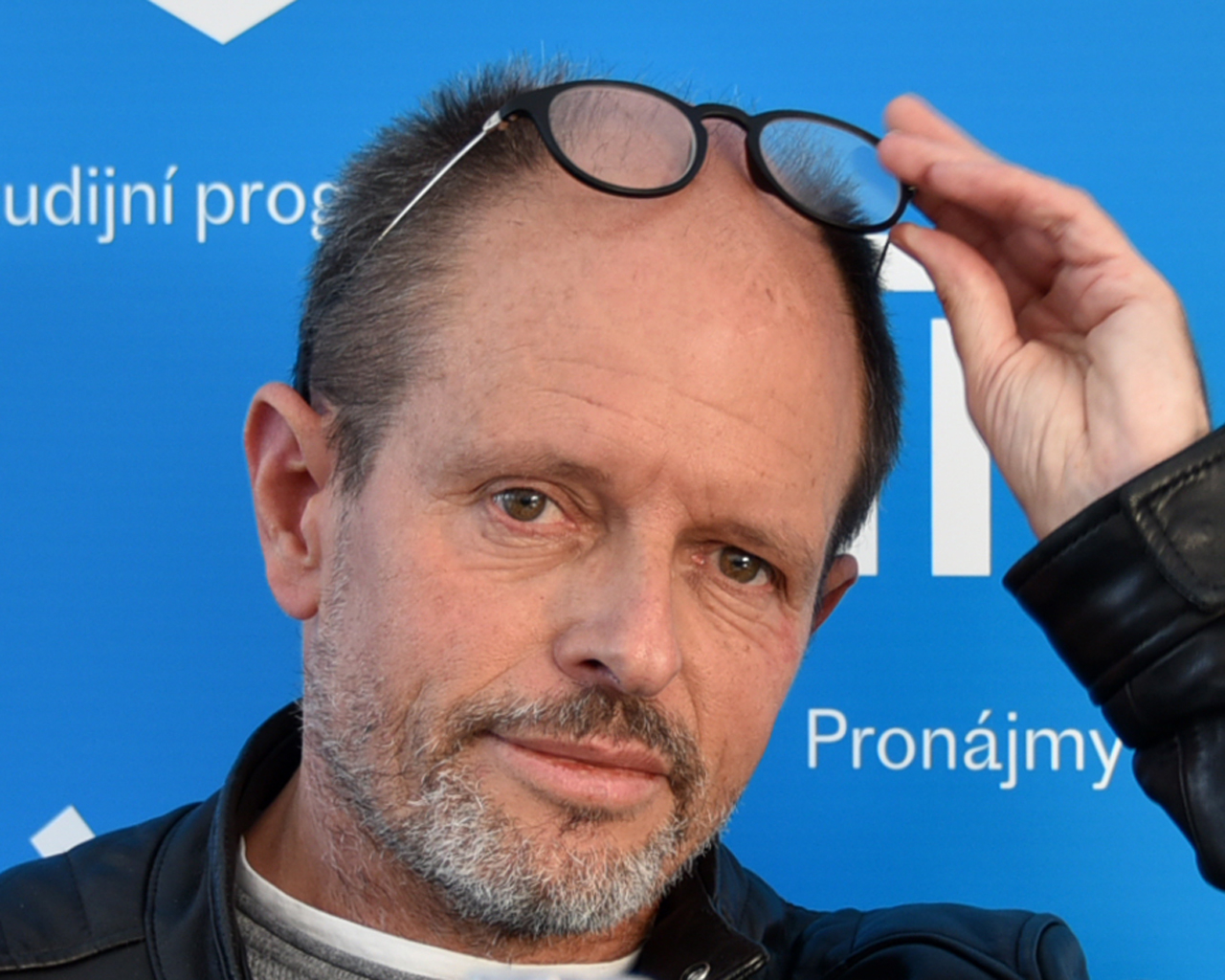
- Bernard Minier
- Born: 26 August 1960 (age 66); Béziers, France
- Writing career
- Notable works: The Frozen Dead, The Hunt
- Notable awards: Prix Festival Polar de Cognac (2011, 2015)

Signature
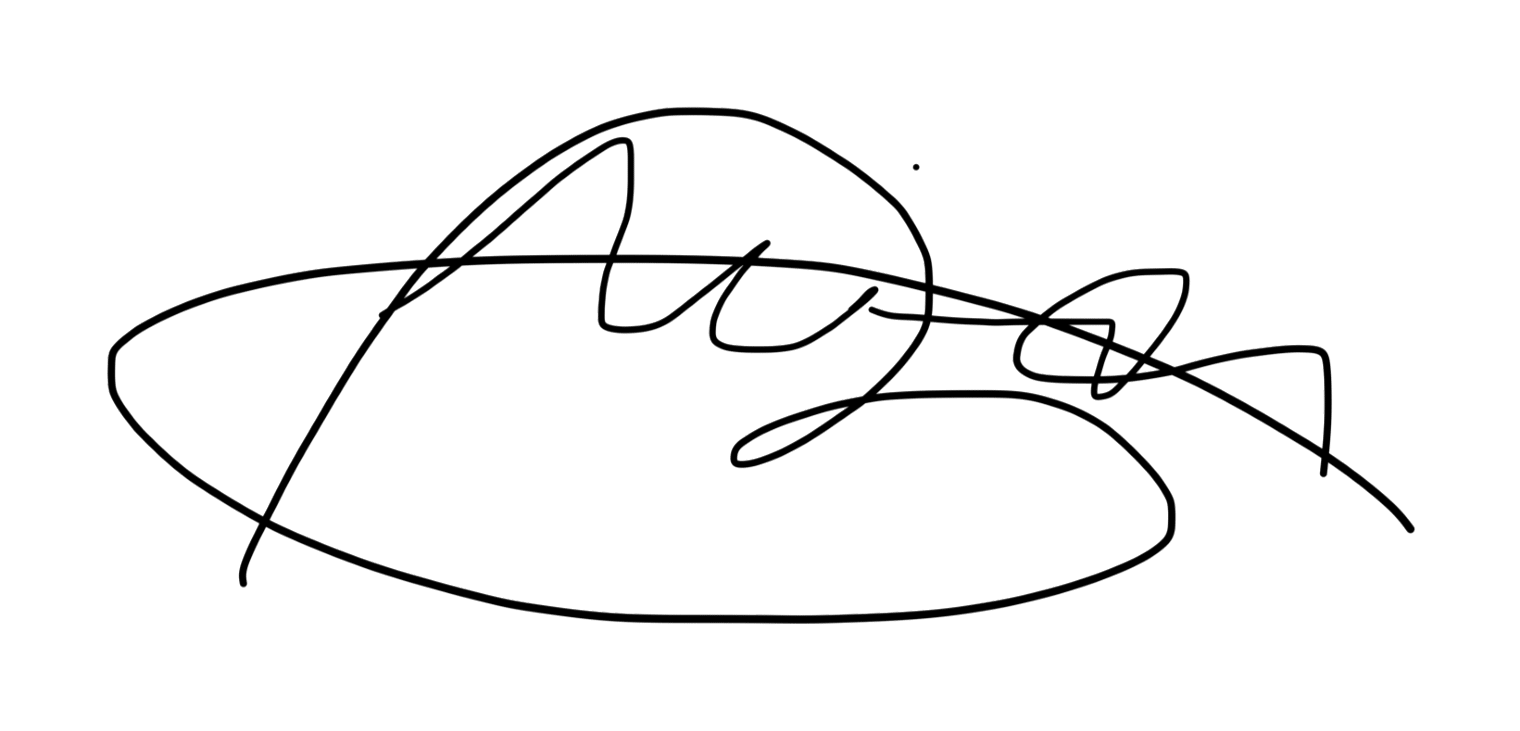

Bernard Minier (born 26 August 1960) is a French novelist.

Minier grew up in Montréjeau at the foot of the Pyrenees, then studied in Tarbes and Toulouse before staying one year in Spain. He lives today in Île-de-France.

He first made a career in the customs administration while participating in short stories competitions before sending a manuscript to publishers. He published his first novel, Glacé, in 2011. He is part of the French artists' collective La Ligue de l'Imaginaire.

He won the Prix Festival Polar de Cognac in 2011 and 2015.

== Books ==
- Glacé, XO éditions, 2011
- Le Cercle, XO éditions, 2012
- N'éteins pas la lumière, XO éditions, 2014
- Une putain d'histoire, XO éditions, 2015
- Nuit, XO éditions, 2017
- Sœurs, XO éditions, 2018
- M, le bord de l'abîme, XO éditions, 2019
- La Vallée, XO éditions, 2020
- La Chasse, XO éditions, 2021
- Lucia, XO éditions, 2022
- Un œil dans la nuit, XO éditions, 2023
- Les Effacées, XO éditions, 2024
- H, XO éditions, 2025
- Ruptures, XO éditions, 2026
