= Bernard Rapp =

French film director and television news presenter

- Born: 17 February 1945; Paris, France
- Died: 17 August 2006 (aged 61); Paris, France
- Education: French Press Institute
- Occupations: Journalist; News presenter Film director Writer
- Spouse: Marie
- Children: 2

Bernard Rapp (17 February 1945 – 17 August 2006) was a French film director and television news presenter.

Rapp was born in Paris. After graduating from university, he worked as a freelance journalist. In 1976, he joined Antenne 2 (now France 2) as their international correspondent, working later as their London correspondent from 1981 to 1983. Rapp was Antenne 2's news anchor from 1983 to 1987. He created a minor stir on 18 May 1986 when he became the first French newscaster to appear on camera without a tie.

Rapp was a two-time winner of the 7 d'Or award (Best TV Newscaster, 1987 and Best Journalist or Reporter, 1988). After leaving the news desk, Rapp, hosted a series of shows on the cultural, culinary, and literary arts.

After a long career in television, Rapp entered the world of cinema in 1996. He wrote and directed the thriller Tiré à part (Limited Edition), starring Terence Stamp. The film was nominated for Best Film at the 1997 Mystfest film festival, where it also won the Fellini Mystery Special Award for best screenplay.

Rapp wrote and directed several other films, including 2000's César-nominated Une affaire de goût (A Question of Taste).

Rapp was the co-author, with Jean-Claude Lamy, of the Larousse Encyclopedia of Cinema, a vast reference work on film. He wrote several other books on film and literature.

Rapp died of lung cancer on 17 August 2006 in Paris.
