= Christian-Marie Monnot =

French journalist (1945–2024)

- Born: Christian-Marie Léon Monnot; 14 November 1945; Besançon, France
- Died: 18 September 2024 (aged 78)
- Education: University of Burgundy; Robert Schuman University
- Occupation: Journalist

Christian-Marie Léon Monnot (French: [kʁistjɑ̃ maʁi mɔnɔ]; 14 November 1945 – 18 September 2024) was a French journalist. He was a member of the Club des médiateurs de la presse and worked as a press mediator for France 2.

== Biography ==
Born in Besançon on 14 November 1945, Monnot's father was SNCF executive Bernard Monnot and his mother was Marguerite Vatageot, who worked as a secretary. From his first marriage, Christian-Marie had one child. He married his second wife, Marie-Hélène Torck, on 3 June 1995, with whom he had three children. He studied at the Lycée Hippolyte-Fontaine and subsequently at the University of Burgundy, earning a law degree. In 1972, he graduated from the Centre universitaire d'enseignement du journalisme at Robert Schuman University.

Monnot worked as a journalist at ORTF Alsace from 1972 to 1975 before serving as editor-in-chief of the regional office of France 3 Centre from 1975 to 1977 and of France 3 Lorraine from 1978 to 1980. From 1980 to 1981, he worked for Action Against Hunger. He then returned to journalism with Antenne 2 as a reporter from 1981 to 1984 before serving as chief economic editor for Télématin from 1984 to 1987. He was editor-in-chief of the Journal de 20 heures from 1987 to 1988. He returned to Antenne 2 as an economic and European correspondent, serving as editor-in-chief in that department from 1996 to 1999. He was appointed secretary-general of the editing staff of France 2 in 1996, a post confirmed in 1998. He was the mediator for the France 2 editorial team from 2005 to 2010 alongside Marie-Laure Augry, who was at France 3. He also hosted L'Hebdo du médiateur until 2008.

Christian-Marie died following a long illness on 18 September 2024, at the age of 78.

== Distinctions ==
- Appointment to the Commission supérieure et à la commission de la carte d'identité des journalistes professionnels (2000)
- Knight of the Legion of Honour (2002)
