= Marie-Sophie Lacarrau =

French journalist and TV presenter (born 1975)

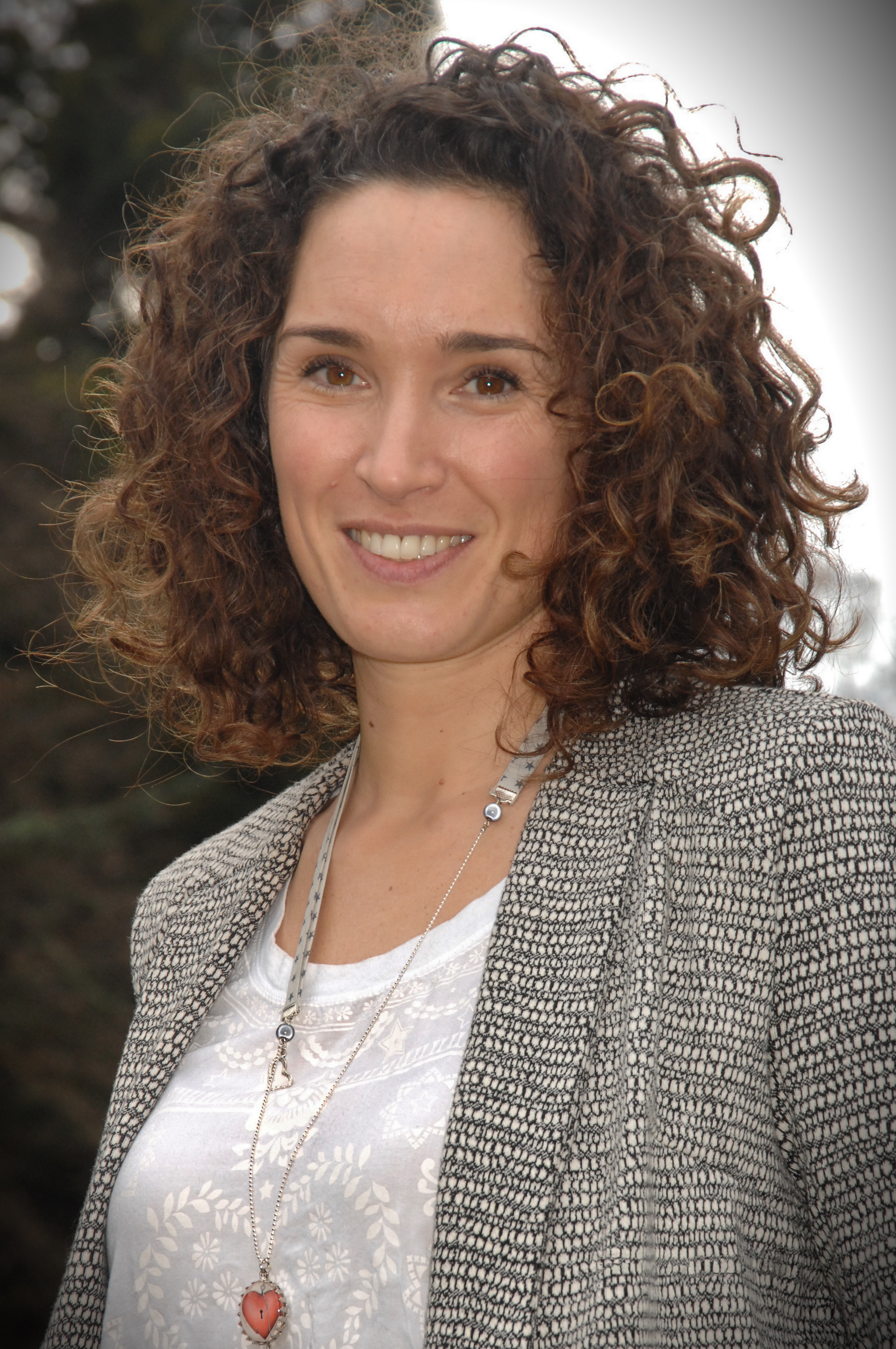
- Born: 20 September 1975 (age 50); Villefranche-de-Rouergue, France
- Education: Lycée Pierre-de-Fermat
- Alma mater: University of Toulouse
- Occupation: Journalist

Marie-Sophie Lacarrau (born 20 September 1975) is a French journalist and TV presenter.

== Biography ==
Born in Aveyron, Villefranche-de-Rouergue, Marie-Sophie Lacarrau grew up near Perpignan. After high school, she attended a literary college (lycée Fermat) in Toulouse in 1995, before obtaining a literature degree at the University of Mirail.

In 1996, she began internships in the newspapers Midi Libre and Le Villefranchois, then the TV channels LCI and M6.

In 2000, Marie-Sophie Lacarrau began work at the editing department of France 3 Quercy-Rouergue, then two years later at France 3 Midi-Pyrénées, where she presented her first regional news TV show during the Christmas holidays of 2005.

In 2010, she replaced Catherine Matausch on France 3 at weekends and became the understudy to Carole Gaessler at the 19/20 national news show.

Since 2016, she has also presented the economy programme In Situ on France 3.

In the fall of 2016, she succeeded Élise Lucet as presenter of the news show 13 heures on France 2.

=== Personal life ===
She married Pierre Bascol on 12 August 2006. She has two children.
