= Laurence Piquet =

French journalist and presenter

- Born: 11 February 1965 (age 61); Mulhouse, France
- Occupation: Journalist
- Employer: France Télévisions

Laurence Piquet is a French journalist and television presenter.

== Biography ==
Piquet first presented 19/20 on FR3. In 1991, she later transferred to France 2. She worked for Télématin from 1994 to 1996. She is perhaps best known for presenting the midday news programme 13 Heures as a weekday co-presenter with Henri Sannier from September 1992 to September 1993, as a weekend presenter from September 1996 to August 1998, alternating with weekday presenter Patrick Chêne and during the summer in 2008, temporarily relieving for the current presenter Élise Lucet and the late night news summary, Le Journal de la Nuit from 1991 to 1994 and again from September 2000 to February 2008.

In December 2009, she co-hosted the Téléthon with Marijosé Alie on France 2. Since 2006, she hosts cultural programs on France 5.
