= Catherine Matausch =

French journalist and painter

- Born: 5 March 1960 (age 66); Var, France
- Occupations: Journalist painter
- Years active: 1982–present
- Children: 2

Catherine Matausch (born 5 March 1960) is a French journalist and painter. She began her career in journalism as an intern of the editorial staff at a local newspaper before joining the local news service of France 3. Matausch joined France 3's national news service in 1988 and reported on the news for such programmes as Soir 3, 19/20, 12/13. She was also the co-presenter of the monthly spiritual show Agapè and the live music programme Dicos d'Or. As a painter, Matausch works with dry pastels, turpentine and watercolour under the pseudonym CathMath and has put her works on display in art galleries since 2006. She published the book Instants Nomades in 2015.

== Biography ==
On 5 March 1960, Matausch was born in either Brignoles or Cabasse in Var, France. She is the oldest of four children to a mining father from Czechoslovakia called Eric Matausch and a mother by the name of Nadine Matausch (née Bonamy) who worked as a cermacist in a workshop. Matausch had some relatives who were painters, and she became interested in painting when she was in her teenage years, something her father disapproved of because he believed she would abuse drugs and not obtain employment. Matausch then thought of going into journalism due to her like of writing. She undertook journalism studies at the Bordeaux-Aquitaine Journalism Institute in Bordeaux.

In mid-1982, Matausch began her career in journalism as an intern member of the editorial staff at the Var-Matin newspaper. She went on to read the news on the Amiens programme at the France 3 Bourgogne television station and then read the local Picardy newspaper from November 1982. She was a junior worker at France 3 for the following seven years. Three years later, Matausch joined the national editorial staff of France 3, working as a society reporter for the Soir 3 programme. She then began working as a relief newscaster on the 19/20 programme on France 3 for the first half of the evening bulletin in 1988, and co-presented it with Éric Cachart from January 1989 to January 1990. Starting in September 1992 (the start the 1992/93 television season), Matausch began reading the news on Soir 3 on weekdays after being given that job by France 3's management. She replaced Richard Tripault as the presenter of Soir 3 on weekends from September 1993. Matausch remained the programme's weekend news presenter until 1996.

Matausch was appointed the presenter of the 12/13 news bulletin in September 1996 and continued in the role until 2004. She and Bernard Pivot co-presented the live music programme Dicos d'Or between 1995 and 1997. From 2004, she began reading the news on the weekend editions of 12/13 and 19/20. Matausch co-hosted with Hervé Claude the Agapè monthly spiritual adventure programme (similar to Le Jour du Seigneur) until 2009. In 2012, she joined the France 3 Pays de la Loire arts programme Ce soir avec vous, presenting a cultural section on it. Matausch took some time off work due to an injury she sustained in a sports accident in early 2016 and was replaced by Nathanaël de Rincquesen until 19 February of that year. She took further time off work between March and May 2022 due to illness and was replaced by Christophe Gascard, David Boéri and Sophie Le Saint during that period. After Matausch rejected an offer to work at La Chaîne Info to focus on her family, she is due to stop reading the national news on France 3 when France Télévisions closes its France 3 national news service and replace it with 24 regional services in September 2023.

Since 2006, she has exhibited her art works at art galleries and has also promoted fellow artists. She works with dry pastels, turpentine and watercolour, and signs her paintings under the pseudonym CathMath. She first drew in her bedroom before moving to a studio and then her living room. Matausch published the book Instants Nomades in 2015, a collection of poetic images accompanied with text by Stéphane Beau. She was the sponsor of the Noirmoutier Science Festival in late 2019 because of the opportunity to learn from neuroscience and how to care for the human body.

== Personal life ==
Matausch is a divorcee and the mother of two children. She was diagnosed with lung cancer in early 2021 which was treated.
