= Lacamp =

Lacamp is a surname. Notable people with the surname include:

- Lucas Lacamp (born 2001), American rugby player
- Max Olivier-Lacamp (1914–1983), French journalist
- Ysabelle Lacamp (1954–2023), French writer and actress

== See also ==
- Lacamp, Louisiana
