= Office de Radiodiffusion Télévision Française =

National broadcaster of France (1964–1974)

Office de radiodiffusion-télévision française

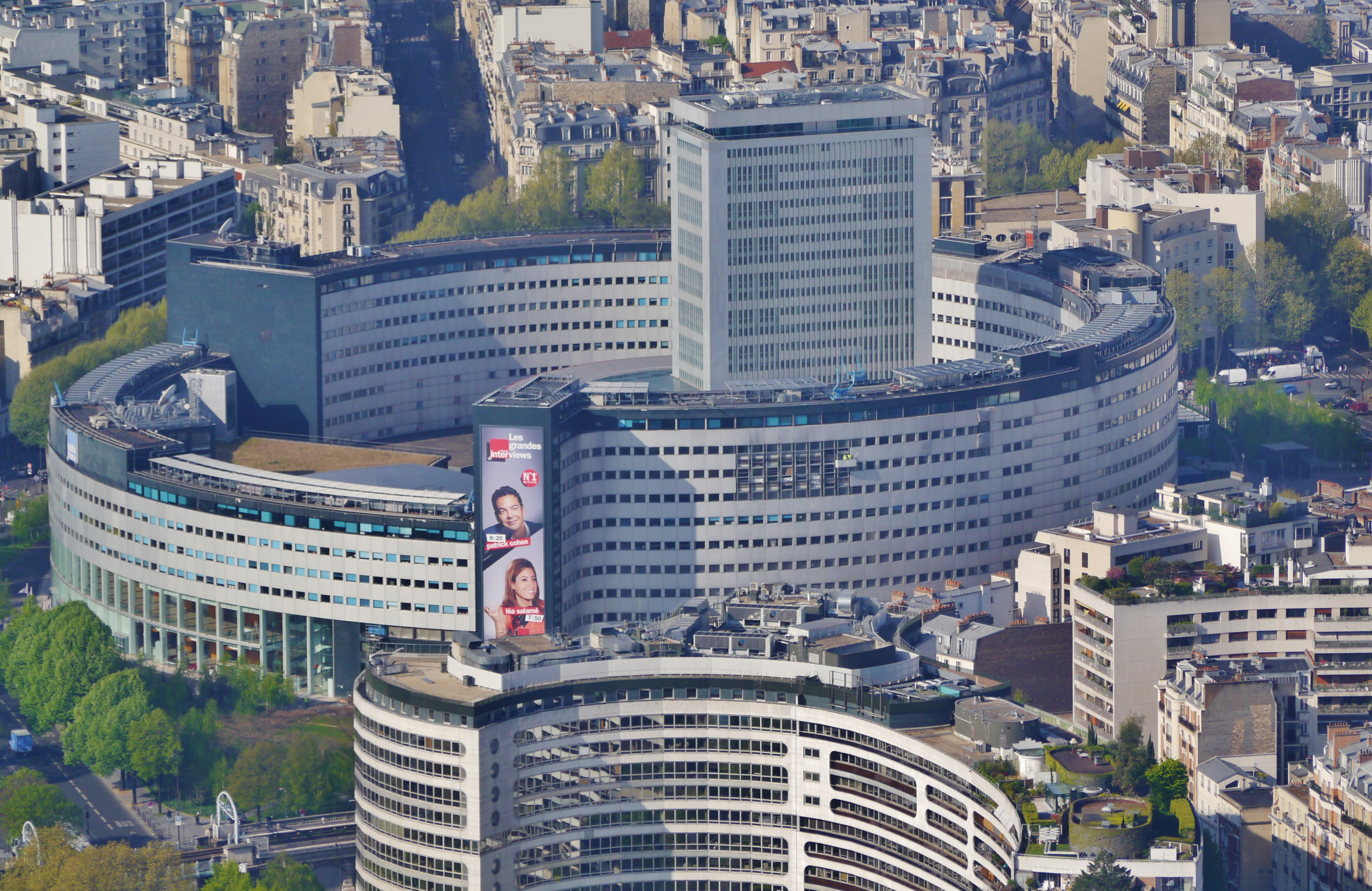
- Maison de la Radio (headquarters)
- Type: Établissement public à caractère industriel et commercial
- Country: France
- Founded: 27 June 1964; 62 years ago
- Headquarters: Maison de la Radio; 116, avenue du Président-Kennedy 75016; Paris
- Owner: Government of France
- Key people: Jacques-Bernard Dupont; Jean-Jacques de Bresson; Arthur Conte; Marceau Long
- Launch date: July 25, 1964; 62 years ago
- Dissolved: January 5, 1975; 51 years ago
- Affiliates: Radio stations: France-Inter; France Culture; France-Musique; France Inter Paris; TV channels: La première chaîne; La deuxième chaîne; La troisième chaîne; Others: Régie française de publicité
- Replaced: Radiodiffusion-Télévision Française
- Replaced by: TF1; France 2; France 3; SFP; INA; TDF; Radio France

The Office de radiodiffusion-télévision française (French pronunciation: [ɔfis də ʁadjodifyzjɔ̃ televizjɔ̃ fʁɑ̃sɛːz]; ORTF; transl. French Broadcasting and Television Office, or French Radio and Television Broadcasting Office) was the national public broadcaster of France from 1964 to 1975. All programming, especially news broadcasts, were under the strict control of the national government.

== History ==
=== Background ===
In 1945, the provisional French government established a public monopoly on broadcasting with the formation of Radiodiffusion Française (RDF). This nationalisation of all private radio stations marked the beginning of a new era of state-controlled broadcasting in France. As part of its mandate, the RDF also established a 441-line television station known as Télévision française. This station made use of the frequencies previously utilized by the Nazi-operated Fernsehsender Paris.

In 1949, the RDF underwent a name change to Radiodiffusion-Télévision Française (RTF) in order to reflect the organisation's growing focus on television broadcasting. By the end of the year, the RTF had begun transmitting television signals using the new 819-line system, which represented a significant advancement in the technical capabilities of the medium. This development allowed for the transmission of high-quality television signals and paved the way for the widespread adoption of television in France.

=== ORTF era ===
In 1964, the RTF was reformed and renamed into the ORTF. The ORTF aimed to modernise the public broadcasting service in order to better satisfy the needs of the French public in terms of information, culture, education, and entertainment. Despite this goal of modernisation and an expressed commitment to meeting the diverse needs of the public, the ORTF continued to operate under a monopoly.

From the beginning, the public broadcaster experienced fierce competition from the "peripheral stations": French-speaking stations aimed at the French public but transmitting on longwave from neighbouring countries, such as Radio Monte Carlo (RMC) from Monaco, Radio Luxembourg (later RTL) from Luxembourg, and Europe 1 from Germany (exceptionally, in 1974, RMC was allowed to set up a transmitter on French territory).

In October 1967, colour television was introduced on the 625-line second channel, France 2. In 1968, advertising was introduced on both television channels, although the broadcasting licence fee (French: redevance audiovisuelle) remained in place.

ORTF employees participated in the May 1968 strikes. When television news deemphasized May 68 events early on, most journalists went on strike. Sixty-five lost their jobs.

In 1970, during a press conference, Georges Pompidou initiated a will to modernise, affirming that information provided to the ORTF must be free from any outside influence, independent in nature, and impartial in its presentation while stressing that it remains "the voice of France whether we like it or not." From 1 January 1970 the first and second channels had separate and competing news divisions, led by the left-wing Pierre Desgraupes and right-wing Jacqueline Baudrier. Most of those fired during May 68 were rehired. The two channels otherwise cooperated, one sometimes with serious programs while the other offered entertainment, and on-screen notices informing viewers that a new program would begin on the other channel.

A third television channel started broadcasting in December 1972.

=== Dissolution ===
The election of Valéry Giscard d'Estaing in 1974 prompted yet another reform. The new liberal administration considered the ORTF to be a relic of Gaullism. Furthermore, the ORTF's annual budget had grown to an unsustainable 2.4 billion francs per year (approximately €2 billion in 2022), indicative of the organization's overly centralised structure. As a result, on December 31, 1974, law 74-696 (dated August 7, 1974) was implemented, splitting the ORTF into seven successor institutions:

- Télévision Française 1 (TF1) – first television channel
- Antenne 2 – second television channel
- France Régions 3 (FR3) – third television channel
- SFP (Société Française de Production) – programme production
- INA (Institut National de l'Audiovisuel) – archives
- TDF (Télédiffusion de France) – transmission
- Radio France (Société Radio-France) – French national and international radio

The changes however did not go into effect until January 6, 1975. Despite the dissolution of the ORTF, the public broadcasting monopoly continued to exist until 1981.

Today only INA and Radio France exist in their original form from 1975. Both TDF and TF1 were privatized (the latter sold to the Bouygues construction company) in 1987. In 1992, the operations of Antenne 2 and FR3 were re-merged into France Télévisions, a single entity which remains under public ownership. SFP was privatized in 2001 and is now a part of Euro Média France.

== Logo ==
The design of the ORTF logo was mostly influenced by the "three ellipses" symbol of its predecessor, with the addition of the letter "O" to create a fourth ellipse. The logo evokes both the concept of radio waves and an image of an electron, symbolising the Atomic Age.

The ORTF logo prominently appeared during the startup and closedown sequences of their television channels. The opening and closing theme of the first channel was ordered by suggestion of musical advisor Daniel-Lesur, to composer Jean-Jacques Grünenwald.

== Services ==
When it was dissolved in 1975, the ORTF operated three national radio networks, 23 regional radio stations, and three television channels in Metropolitan France. Thirteen of the regional radio stations later became stations of the France Bleu radio network. The other 10, each of which were music only stations, became Fip. It operated an additional eight radio stations and seven television stations in the overseas territories.

=== Metropolitan France ===
==== National radio ====
- France Inter
- France Culture
- France Musique

==== Regional radio ====
- Paris
- Marseille
- Reims
- Lorraine
- Bordeaux
- Lyon
- Côte d'Azur
- Lille
- Toulouse
- Loire-Atlantique

==== National television ====
- 1^{re} chaîne de l'ORTF (819-line VHF, monochrome only)
- 2^{e} chaîne de l'ORTF / 2^{e} chaîne couleur (625-line UHF, colour available from October 1, 1967)
- 3^{e} chaîne couleur de l'ORTF (625-line UHF, colour available from launch)

==== Regional television ====
Map of ORTF regional channels

The ORTF also operated 11 regional television services that provided programming for all three channels:

- Lille
- Strasbourg
- Marseille Provence
- Lyon
- Toulouse-Pyrénées
- Bordeaux Aquitaine
- Bretagne Loire-Océan
- Paris Normandie Centre
- Lorraine Champagne
- Limognes-Centre-Ouest
- Bourgogne Franche-Comté

=== Overseas France ===
==== Radio ====
- Radio Saint-Denis
- Radio Saint-Pierre et Miquelon
- Radio Guadeloupe
- Radio Nouméa
- Radio Martinique
- Radio Tahiti
- Radio Guyane
- Radio Comores

==== Television ====
- Télé Martinique
- Télé Guadeloupe
- Télé Réunion
- Télé Tahiti
- Télé Nouméa
- Télé Guyane
- Télé Saint-Pierre et Miquelon

The overseas stations were given to FR3 as part of the dissolution, and today form part of the La Première network.

== Membership of the European Broadcasting Union ==
In 1950 the ORTF's predecessor, RTF, had been one of 23 founding broadcasting organisations of the European Broadcasting Union (EBU). Upon the break-up of the ORTF in 1974, French membership of the EBU was transferred to the transmission company TDF, while TF1 became a second French active member. A2, FR3, and SRF became supplementary active members before eventually becoming full members in 1982. In 1983 the French public broadcasters' membership was transferred to a joint organisation, the Organisme Français de Radiodiffusion et de Télévision (OFRT). Nine years later, the OFRT was succeeded by the Groupement des Radiodiffuseurs Français de l’UER (GRF).

TF1 left the EBU in 2018. Private TV channel Canal+ served as an additional member between 1984 and 2018.

== See also ==
- Radiodiffusion-Télévision Française, the predecessor organisation
- Musique concrète, which the ORTF continued to develop
- Arcom, modern-day regulating authorities
- Groupe TF1, a successor organisation
- France Télévisions, a successor organisation
- Orchestre National de France, a symphony orchestra once under the administration of the ORTF
- ORTF stereo technique, a well known audio engineering technique for recording sources using stereo microphone setups.
