= Pièces à Conviction =

French investigative journalism TV program

- Created by: Olivier D Angely
- Developed by: Olivier D Angely
- Starring: Elise Lucet; Laurent Richard
- Narrated by: Laurent Richard
- Country of origin: France
- Original language: French

Production
- Executive producers: Elise Lucet, Herve Brusini
- Camera setup: multiple-camera setup
- Running time: 65 minutes

Original release
- Network: France 3

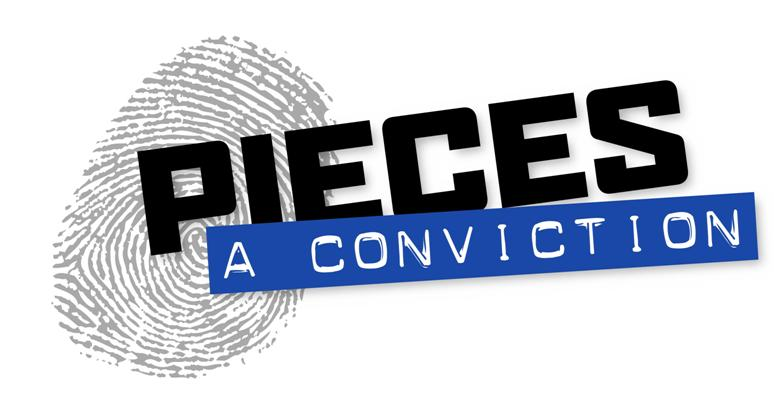

Pièces à Conviction (French for "incriminating evidence") is a monthly French investigative journalism TV program that airs on France 3. Elise Lucet has hosted the program since 2000. Since 2017 the program is hosted by Virna Sacchi.

== Description ==
According to European Journalism Centre, the program is an "in depth news show", containing "in depth reporting of actual themes focusing on social injustices".

Pièces à Conviction airs once per month, on Friday evenings. According to its website, the program draws over 1 million viewers. The program is produced by Elise Lucet and Herve Brusini.

Each month, a topic, a subject is factually examined, under all facets. Each story delivers the fruit of the investigations, tells the methodology of research, and new elements, thanks to the reports and of the interviews carried out by Elise Lucet with the personality-key, the forgotten witnesses, experts or persons in charge concerned.

== Conference on Investigative Journalism ==
Several members of the production crew of Pièces à Conviction were to appear at the October 2006 conference on investigative journalism in Paris at Sciences Po sponsored by the Nieman Foundation at Harvard University. The promotional publication read:

If you want the ability to probe into people's hidden backgrounds, find corrupt deals within the European Union, uncover criminal and terrorist networks, expose human-rights abuses, or find breaking news information in corporate documents, you will find invaluable skills in this workshop.

The special seminar led by the Pièces à Conviction representatives was entitled "Investigative Reporting for Broadcasting".

How to create investigative projects on television. How to shoot footage and record audio without being noticed. When is it acceptable for journalists to use hidden cameras? Can people conceal their identity on screen? The team of France 3's Television's investigative program Pièces à Conviction will discuss these issues and show some of their coverage, as examples of how to deal with these questions.
By, Pascal Richard, chief editor, Lionel de Coninck, deputy chief editor, Laurent Richard, reporter from Pièces à Conviction, an investigative program on France 3 Television.

== Awards ==
- 2003 – Prize – "le prix de la meilleure émission d’information de l’année", for its investigation into the Frigates of Taiwan
- 2005 – International Festival of Grand Reporting Factuality – FIGRA "le Festival international du grand reportage d’actualité", awarded the prize for the program's investigation of Patrice Alegre, convicted killer
- 2006 – Dauphine-Henri Tézenas of Montcel Prize
- 2006 – Albert Londres Prize
