= Complément d'enquête =

French television program

Complément d'enquête (Further Investigation) is an investigative newsmagazine shown in Metropolitan France on France 2 weekdays late in the evening, and, in Canada, bi-monthly on TV5.

The programme was created in 2001 by journalist Benoît Duquesne, who hosted it until his death in 2014. It was later hosted by Nicolas Poincaré (2014-2017), Thomas Sotto (2017-2018) and Jacques Cardoze (2018-2021). As of 2021, the programme has been hosted by Tristan Waleckx.

A similar investigative, Panorama, is shown in the UK on BBC television.
