= Nathanaël de Rincquesen =

French journalist & TV presenter (born 1972)

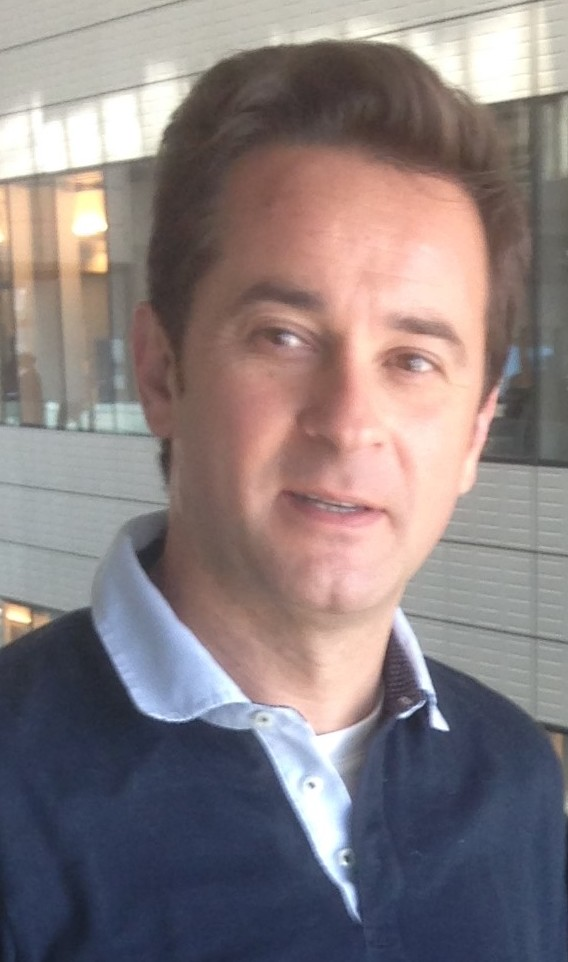
- de Rincquesen in 2016
- Born: Nathanaël de Willecot de Rincquesen; 9 March 1972 (age 54); Paris (Île-de-France)
- Education: Panthéon-Assas University; École supérieure de journalisme de Paris
- Occupations: Journalist, Television presenter
- Known for: News Presenter on Télématin and Journal de 13 heures

Nathanaël de Rincquesen (born Nathanaël de Willecot de Rincquesen on 9 March 1972 in Paris) is a French journalist and TV presenter.

== Biography ==
A former student of college Langevin-Wallon at Saint-Gratien in the Val-d'Oise and a former student of Assas (University Paris II), Nathanael of Rincquesen graduated from the École supérieure de journalisme de Paris in 1995.

He began his journalism career in editing at France 2, in the Sport department at which he followed the Tour de France and major international fencing competitions.

In 1997, he broke into Télématin, the morning show of the channel, as a sports chronicler before returning a few years later to press review work.

During the summer of 2008, he covered, for France Television, the sport of Fencing at the Summer Olympics 2008 at Beijing, alongside Philippe Boisse and Jean-François Lamour.

Since September 2008, he has presented the news on the TV show Télématin. He covers the time period between 7 am and 8 am while Sophie Le Saint presents the news at 6:30 pm, 7:30 pm and 8:55 pm.

Since the summer of 2009, he replaced Élise Lucet in presenting the news show 13 heures, alternating with Sophie Le Saint.

In 2012, he commented alongside Brice Guyart and Jean-François Lamour on the sport of Fencing at the Summer 2012 Olympic Games at London for France Télévisions.

== Personal life ==
Coming from a family that takes the origin of its name from an ancient manor in the commune of Samer in the Pas-de-Calais, (having strong ties to Châlus in the Limousin), Nathanael of Rincquesen is the son of Olivier de Rincquesen, former journalist at Europe 1 and brother of Victoire de Rincquesen, journalist, currently on BFM Radio.

== Sporting life ==
In 1990, competing for the Fencing Club of Saint-Gratien, Nathanael de Rincquesen was on the team that was junior fencing champion of France, with Cyril Faucher, Arnaud Laborde, Frédéric and Levilain Hugues Obry.
