= France 3 Normandie =

- Logo used since 2018
- Country: France
- Broadcast area: Normandy
- Headquarters: Rouen

Programming
- Language: French language

Ownership
- Owner: France Télévisions

History
- Launched: 1964; 61 years ago
- Former names: FR3 Normandie (1983–1992); FR3 Paris-Normandie-Centre (1975–1983); ORTF Télé-Normandie (1964–1975)

Links
- Website: normandie.france3.fr

France 3 Normandie is one of France 3's regional stations, serving the French region of Normandy.

The station's headquarters, as well as the main broadcasting centre and studios, are located in Rouen. In addition, the station operates two local broadcasting centres with their own television facilities: one in Rouen serves the departments of Seine-Maritime and Eure, the other in Caen serves the departments of Calvados, Manche and Orne.

Two distinctive programmings are broadcast from these centres, this includes two distinct editions of the channel's flagship news bulletins Ici Matin, Ici 12/13 and Ici 19/20, prepared by the editorial teams based in Rouen and Caen. A local news bulletin called Baie de Seine, covers Le Havre and the area of the same name. It is produced by a team based in Le Havre. France 3 being known for having the most closely meshed network of news bureaus in France, its station in Normandy is no exception. France 3 Normandie has several crews scattered throughout the region. The bureaus in Dieppe and Évreux are managed by the editor-in-chief based at Rouen's centre, and the bureaus in Alençon, Avranches and Cherbourg-en-Cotentin are managed by the editor-in-chief based at Caen's centre.

France 3 Normandie also produces entertainment shows in the morning on Mondays, Tuesdays and Thursdays and a political show on Sundays. Also, twice a month, the station aires a magazine scheduled after the prime-time.

== Presenters and journalists ==
=== At Rouen's Broadcasting Centre ===
- Angèle de Vecchi
- Marie du Mesnil-Adelée
- Bénédicte Drouet
- Stéphane Gérain
- Julie Howlett
- Émilie Leconte
- Frédéric Nicolas
- Magali Nicolin
- Béatrice Rabelle
- François Verly

=== News anchor ===
- Franck Besnier
- Pauline Comte
- Liane Courté
- Simon Derrien
- David Frotté
- Anaïs Guérard
- Simon Le Pape
- Gwénaëlle Louis
- Erwan de Miniac
- Aurélie Misery
- Amandine Pinault
- Ayi-Benjamine Rombhot
- Sylvain Rouil
- Florent Turpin

=== Past ===
- Franck Bodereau
- Émilie Flahaut
- Laurent Marvyle
- Jacques Perrotte

== Capital ==
France 3 Normandie has an annual budget of 31.97 million euros.

== See also ==
- France 3 Bourgogne
