= Jacques Cardoze =

French journalist

- Born: September 14, 1969 (age 56); Bordeaux, France
- Occupation: Journalist

Jacques Cardoze (born September 14, 1969) is a French journalist and communications director.

He worked in radio at France Inter from 1992, as a reporter in the sports department, before joining France Télévisions in 1994.

At France 2, he was a reporter, correspondent and special envoy in France and abroad, as well as a senior reporter. On the same channel, he also produced reports for Envoyé spécial. From 2018 to 2021, he presented the investigative magazine Complément d'enquête.

From June 2021 to December 2022, he was communications director at Olympique de Marseille.

For its coverage of American news, the Foreign Press Association awarded him the Grand Prix de la Presse Internationale in the "television" category in December 2018.

== Biography ==
Cardoze trained in sport and studies at the École de l'Opéra de Paris, and graduated in music and dance history at the Conservatoire National de Paris. He was a professional dancer for several years, notably with the Ballet français de Nancy, then directed by Patrick Dupond.

He then did an internship at Radio France. He began his career as a reporter in the sports department of France Inter in 1992, where he presented the news (1992–1995). In 1994, he joined France Télévisions, where he collaborated in the creation of the Journal des sports de France 3, which became Tout le sport.

In 1995, he became a France service reporter for France 2, and immediately made a name for himself by obtaining an exclusive interview with the two half-brothers of the Cuers massacre killer. He also covered the major strikes of 1995 and produced his first magazine for Envoyé Spécial. He then worked as a correspondent in Marseille from 1997 to 1999, covering events in Corsica as part of the war waged by the nationalists. For Envoyé spécial, he produced several reports, including on the Japanese organization Sōka Gakkai, on justice in Corsica, the safety of French citizens in Nigeria, polls and the Front National vote in 2002. He also produced a portrait of artists Shirley and Dino.

He also worked on the channel's other programs, Complément d'enquête and Un œil sur la planète, before joining the Investigations and Reports department as a senior reporter. He covered the bombings in Madrid and London, Hurricane Katrina in New Orleans, the war in Afghanistan and the war in Darfur. Jacques Cardoze then moved to London, where he covered the 2012 Summer Olympics, Diamond Jubilee of Elizabeth II, the wedding of Prince William and Catherine Middleton in 2011, and the election of David Cameron in 2009. He also covered the entire U.S. election campaign in 2016. He is a regular commentator on White House news, international diplomatic crises (special envoy to Cuba, Venezuela, Mexico and Canada), and American news where he has covered a wide range of subjects.

In September 2023, he joined C8 as a columnist on Touche pas à mon poste!
