= Sophie Le Saint =

French journalist and television presenter

- Born: 22 July 1968 (age 58); Parthenay, Deux-Sèvres, France
- Occupations: Journalist, television presenter
- Years active: 1991–present
- Notable credit(s): Télématin; Journal de 13 heures Journal de 20 heures
- Television: France 2 (1998–2019); France Info (2019–present)

Sophie Le Saint (born 22 July 1968) is a French journalist and television presenter. From November 1998 to July 2019, she was a presenter on channel France 2 hosting Télématin and as a replacing presenter at the Journal de 13 heures, and in exceptional occasions at the Journal de 20 heures.

== Education and early career ==
Sophie Le Saint was born in Parthenay in the department of Deux-Sèvres. She graduated at the Institute of Journalism of Bordeaux and began her career at France Bleu Provence as a volunteer where she presents the night programs, and followed with an internship at M6 in 1989. She then worked at the redaction department of the daily newspaper Le Figaro from 1991 to 1994, and on TF1 as a stringer.

== Television career ==
In November 1998, she joined France 2 to present the Télématin. Since February 2008, she is one of the replacing presenters of the Journal de 13 heures on the same channel. During summer 2008, she presented alternatively with Laurence Piquet the midday edition. After the nomination of Françoise Laborde at the Conseil supérieur de l'audiovisuel in January 2009, she became the permanent replacement of Élise Lucet at the 13 heures.

In July 2010, she replaced Laurent Delahousse at the 13 heures on weekend. In August 2010 and April 2011, she replaced David Pujadas at the Journal de 20 heures during the week. From March 2015 to August 2016, she was a replacing presenter for the 13 heures on France 2. Between 2015 and 2019, she was not part of the replacing presenters of the channel anymore and focused entirely on presenting Télématin. However, she presented again the 13 heures on weekend in April 2019 replacing Leïla Kaddour, as well as the 20 heures on weekend in July 2019 replacing Laurent Delahousse.

She announced on 4 July 2019 leaving Télématin on her Instagram account. She joined the channel France Info in August 2019 to present the afternoon news 13h-17h.
