= The Vengeance of the Winged Serpent =

- Directed by: Gérard Oury
- Written by: Gérard Oury; Danièle Thompson
- Produced by: Pierre Grunstein; Héctor López; Christian Spillemaecker
- Starring: Coluche; Maruschka Detmers; Luis Rego; Josiane Balasko
- Cinematography: Henri Decaë
- Edited by: Albert Jurgenson
- Music by: Michel Polnareff
- Distributed by: AMLF
- Release date: 28 November 1984
- Running time: 105 minutes
- Country: France
- Language: French
- Box office: $20 million

The Vengeance of the Winged Serpent (French: La vengeance du serpent à plumes) is a 1984 French comedy film directed by Gérard Oury, starring Coluche, Maruschka Detmers, Luis Rego and Josiane Balasko.

== Plot ==
On arrival in Paris, Paco, an international terrorist, is arrested, while his mistress Laura joins his accomplices. They all belong to terrorist and anarchist splinter group, Ravachol-Kropotkin, led by Paco. Meanwhile, Louie (Loulou) Dupin learns that his grandmother is dead and he is the sole heir of her Paris apartment. He also goes to Paris.

Upon his arrival, he is pleasantly surprised to find two young women in his apartment: Valérie and Laura. Although he originally intended to make them leave, Laura charms him and changes his mind. She and her partners (including Valérie and her boyfriend who specializes in explosives) wish to keep their homes which are also hiding places for weapons and ammunition, and key points for their next attack. His seduction Loulou is not difficult; his accomplices are also trying to have him assassinated, which for lack of luck is more complicated. When he began to search all the rooms in search of gold louis purchased and hidden by her grandmother, Laura is forced to sleep with him to distract him. However, the treasure is found quickly, and they can concentrate on their plan.

The conspirators kidnap Alix Lefebure, the son of a prominent banker and industrialist, in order to exchange him for Paco. The evening of the exchange, Louie and Laura spend the night at the hotel. Laura leaves him a small gift of explosives before joining the others. One of Louie's friend Alvaro's pet monkey saves him by taking the package to a meeting of emirs. On returning home, Louie finds the apartment empty, with only a few weapons left behind. He understands that he has been deceived when he sees Laura, Paco and the rest of the group on TV, running away by plane.

Having found fake passports hidden behind a mirror, he moves to Mexico, where Laura had said she had met Paco. The monkey and his owner are wanted for the bomb that exploded at the hotel, and also travel with him. Loulou, wanted for the abduction of Lefebure, intends to lay hands on Laura, to the chagrin of Alvaro. After a long discussion, Loulou finally resolves to return to France. That is when they encounter one of the terrorists, and follow him to their new hideout. Loulou helps the others to load a mysterious box in a truck to the Yucatán. Back at the hideout, he discovers that Valérie's boyfriend has died. He is arrested shortly after.

Together with the French police, who believes them to be accomplices of Paco, the Mexican police stage the escape of Loulou and Alvaro helped by guerrillas. They hope to follow them to Paco. Loulou and Alvaro escape their surveillance, and are found in Cancun during the (real-life) North–South Summit on the Third World. They see terrorists fly an extra pillar to the Aztec pyramid near the meeting place during the night. While inspecting the curious addition, they are captured by Paco and Laura. Taken in a Jeep driven by Valérie, they escape thanks to Alvaro monkey. They then neutralize other terrorists, and reveal to Valérie the death of his boyfriend, killed on the orders of Paco. The latter then decides to help Loulou and Alvaro remove the pillar by helicopter. It actually contains a nuclear missile. It falls into the sea, and explodes. Laura, brought along by Loulou is finally seduced by him. They are to have a child.

== Cast ==
- Coluche as Loulou Dupin
- Maruschka Detmers as Laura
- Luis Rego as Alvaro
- Josiane Balasko as Jackie
- Farid Chopel as Mustapha
- Philippe Khorsand as Ratoff
- Ged Marlon as Alix Lefebure
- Jean Lanier as Gaston Lefebure
- Dominique Frot as Valerie
- François Dunoyer as Goretto
- Rodolfo De Souza as Paco
- Jackie Sardou as The concierge
- Jeanne Herviale as The neighbor
- Sacha Briquet as The hotel's concierge
- Hervé Claude as The journalist
- Clémentine Célarié
- Henri Attal
