= Cycling in the Channel Tunnel =

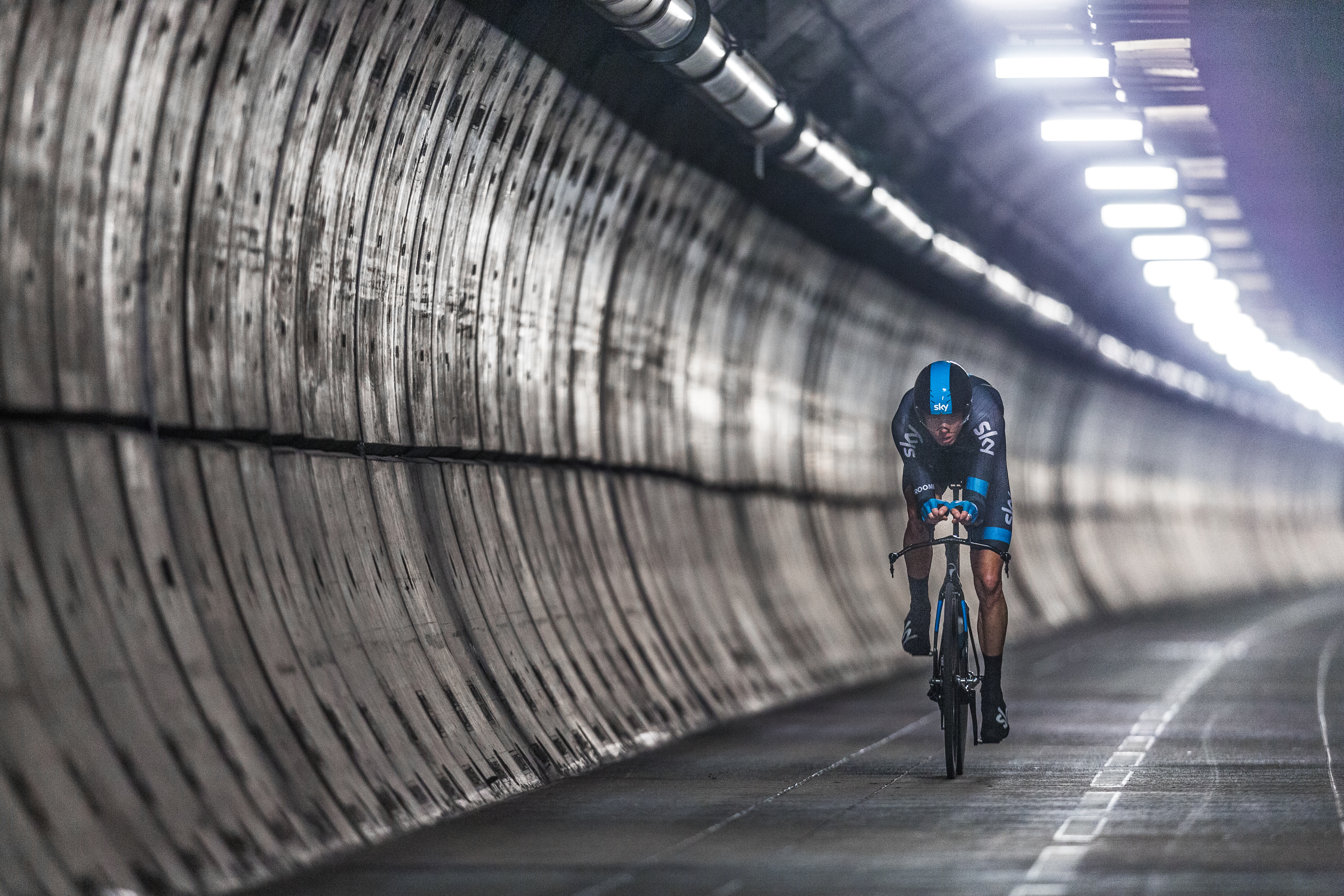
Cycling on the screed surface in the Channel Tunnel service tunnel, between the two railway tunnels

Pedal cycles are generally allowed to cross the Channel Tunnel, which connects the United Kingdom and France, via the Eurotunnel cycle service. This service uses a minibus and a bicycle trailer capable of carrying six bicycles.

On a few occasions since 1993, cyclists have crossed directly through the Channel Tunnel's bidirectional service tunnel, located between the two rail tunnel bores. The service tunnel has airlocks at both ends and a concrete road surface.

== Construction ==
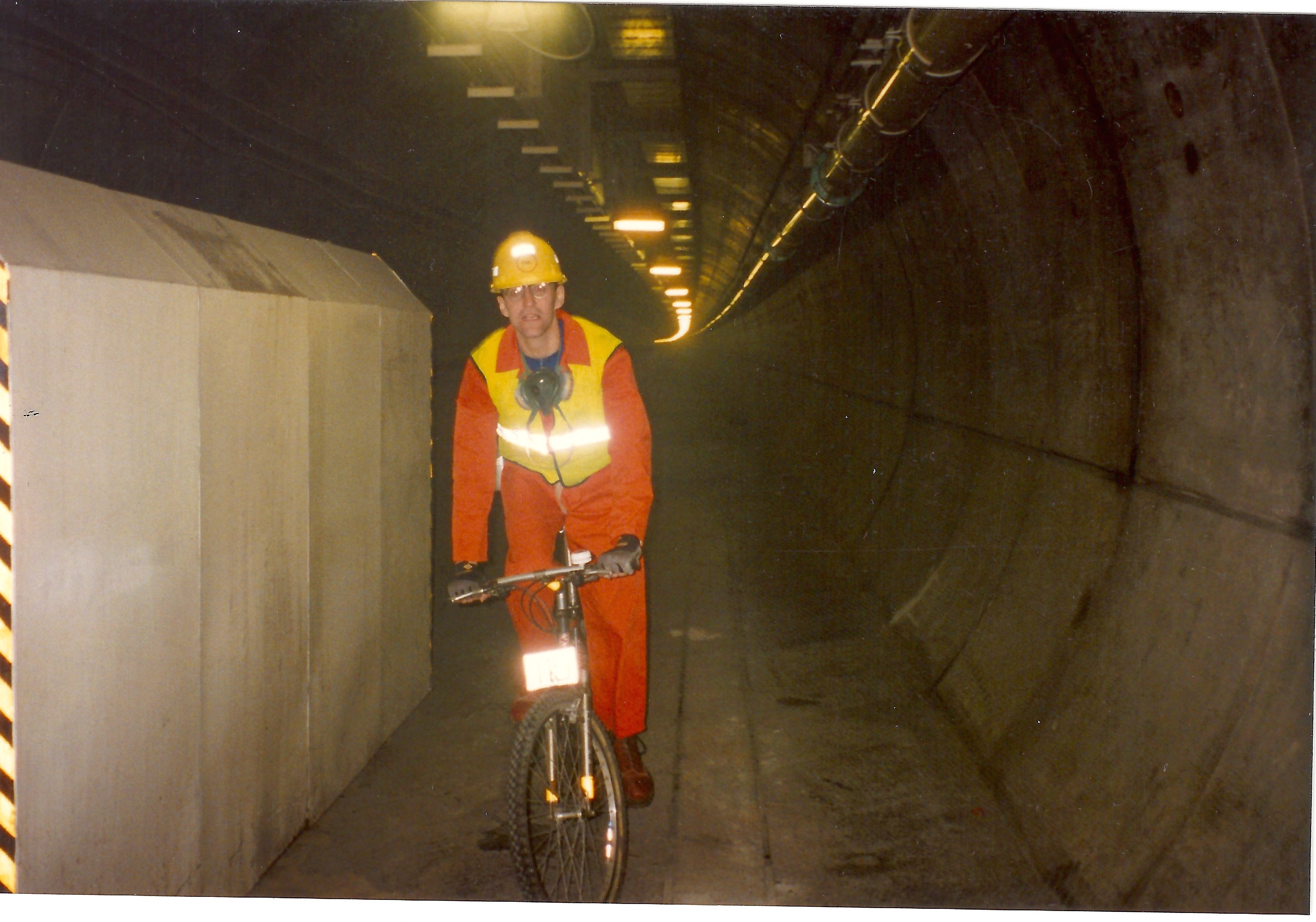
Mike Turner on a bike in the service tunnel in 1993

During the construction of the Channel Tunnel, over 200 bicycles were used by workers. The French side contributed 80 bicycles from Peugeot, while the UK side used 125 Saracen bicycles. The Saracen mountain bikes were initially ordered in small batches by plant manager Kevin Otto before the full fleet was delivered. Over 850 workers on the UK side were trained and issued passes for using the service tunnel.

In October 1993, contractors Wally Michalski and Mike Turner cycled the 100-kilometre (62 mi) round trip from Folkestone to Coquelles using Saracen bicycles. Wearing full overalls and carrying respirators, the journey took approximately five hours.

In November 1993, journalists Nick Dutton-Taylor and Damon Brown rode Saracen bicycles into the tunnel for an article in Mountain Biking UK. They were trained and accompanied by a cycling trainer but were not permitted to travel the full length of the tunnel.

== After opening ==
Since the tunnel's opening, there have been several organized bicycle crossings:

- 2–3 December 1994: A group of professional and semi-professional cyclists completed a London-to-Paris ride in support of Téléthon en France '94. This 1994 peloton was led by Henri Sannier and accompanied by Jean-Michel Guidez, Patrick Chêne, Jean Mamère, Marc Toesca, Thierry Marie, Paul Belmondo, Bernard Darniche, Jean-François Guiborel and others. The group used the service tunnel to cross between Folkestone and Coquelles, accompanied by a STTS vehicle.
- 1 June 2014: Chris Froome rode through the tunnel from England to France as part of a Team Sky promotional video, taking 55 minutes for the crossing.
- 9 November 2018: The Children in Need Rickshaw Challenge team cycled through the tunnel on the first leg of their journey from Calais to Salford.

Cyclists can also cross to France via ferries, Eurostar, or by car, which may require disassembly or advance arrangements.
