= France 3 Paris Île-de-France =

- Logo used since 2018
- Country: France
- Broadcast area: Île-de-France and Centre-Val de Loire
- Headquarters: Paris

Ownership
- Owner: France Télévisions

History
- Launched: 1965
- Former names: FR3 Paris Île-de-France Centre (1975–1992); France 3 Paris Île-de-France Centre (1992–2010)

Links
- Website: France 3 Paris Île-de-France

France 3 Paris Île-de-France is a regional television service and part of the France 3 network. It is broadcast from its headquarters in Paris. It broadcasts to people in the Île-de-France and the Centre-Val de Loire regions. Its content is produced in Paris.

== Current presenters ==
- Marlène Blin (Ici 19/20 news)
- Carla Carrasqueira (Ici 12/13 news)
- Jean-Noël Mirande (weekend news)
- Florent Carrière (Dimanche en politique)
- Vincent Ferniot (Ensemble c’est mieux !)
- Wendy Bouchard (Boulevard de la Seine)
- Yvan Hallouin (Paname)
- Bertrand Lambert (Parigo)

== Other presenters ==
- Séverine Larrouy (replacing 12/13 news)
- Céline Cabral (replacing weekend news)
- Yannick Le Gall (« Avant le JT »)
- Emmanuel Tixier (chronicler « Avant le JT »)
- William Van Qui (« 5 minutes pour convaincre »)

== Current programming ==
- Ici 12/13
- Ici 19/20
- Parigo
- Dimanche en politique
- Enquêtes de région
- Paname
- Boulevard de la Seine
- Ensemble c’est mieux !
- La France en vrai

== Former presenters ==
- Paul Wermus
- Marianne Théoleyre
- Sébastien Thomas
- Élisabeth de Pourquery
- Pierre Lacombe
- Maud De Bohan
- Jean-Jacques Cros
- Laura Massis

== Former programming ==
- 13 minutes dimanche
- La Voix est libre
- Vues sur Loire
- Elysée Wermus
- Le Plus Grand Musée du Monde

== See also ==
- France 3 Centre
