= France 3 Limousin Poitou-Charentes =

Former regional television service in France

Coordinates: 45°51′27″N 1°16′09″E

- Country: France
- Broadcast area: Limous, Poitou-Charentes
- Headquarters: Limoges

Ownership
- Owner: France Télévisions

History
- Launched: 1965; 61 years ago
- Closed: 2010; 16 years ago
- Replaced by: France 3 Limousin; France 3 Poitou-Charentes
- Former names: ORTF Télé-Limoges-Centre-Oues (1965–1975); FR3 Limousin Poitou-Charentes (1975–1992)

Links
- Website: limousin-poitou-charentes.france3.fr

France 3 Limousin Poitou-Charentes logo from 1992 to 2002

France 3 Limousin Poitou-Charentes is a former regional television service and part of the France 3 network. Serving the Limousin and Poitou-Charentes regions from its headquarters in Limoges, secondary production centre in Poitiers and newsrooms in La Rochelle and Brive-la-Gaillarde, France 3 Limousin Poitou-Charentes produces regional news, sport, features and entertainment programming.

== History ==
ORTF regional broadcasts began in 1965 as ORTF Télé-Limoges-Centre-Oues. After the de-establishment of ORTF on 6 January 1975, the station became known as FR3 Limousin Poitou-Charentes. Following the establishment of France Télévisions on 7 September 1992, FR3 Limousin was rebranded France 3 Limousin Poitou-Charentes.

== Programming ==
=== News ===
France 3 Limousin Poitou-Charentes produces daily news programmes for its two sub-regions - programming for the Limousin sub-region is produced in Limoges, with the Poitou-Charentes sub-region receiving programming from Poitiers. Each sub-region produces a 27-minute bulletin (midi-pile) at 1200 CET during 12|13 and a main half-hour news broadcast at 1900 during 19|20. Three 10-minute local bulletins serving the Limoges, Atlantique (in and around La Rochelle) and Pays de Corrèze areas are broadcast during 19|20 at 1845 CET.

On 5 January 2009, a 5-minute late night bulletin was introduced, forming part of Soir 3.

== Capital ==
France 3 Limousin Poitou-Charentes has an annual budget of €25.53 million (£17.9 m, $36.7 m).
