= Ysabelle Lacamp =

French novelist and actress (1954–2023)

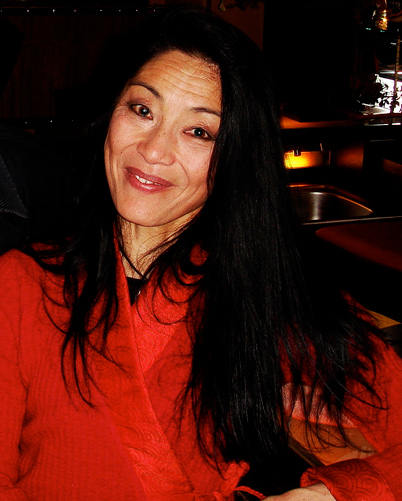
Lacamp in 2009

Ysabelle Lacamp (7 November 1954 – 26 June 2023) was a French novelist, singer and actress.

== Biography ==
=== Early life and education ===
Ysabelle Lacamp was born in Neuilly-sur-Seine on 7 November 1954. She was the daughter of French journalist and writer Max Olivier-Lacamp (prix Renaudot 1969) and Pyong-You Hyun of Korean origin.

Lacamp received a degree in Chinese and Korean from the School of Oriental and African Studies in London and in Oriental languages from Paris.

=== Career ===
Lacamp started as an actress in 1975, first appearing in the cinema in the second part of the film Emmanuelle. She played notably in 1983 in Le Marginal by Jacques Deray with Jean-Paul Belmondo and Le Joli Cœur with Francis Perrin. On television, she appeared in episodes of the series Les Enquêtes du Commissaire Maigret, Les Cinq Dernières Minutes and in 2002 in Fabio Montale, with Alain Delon.

Throughout her roles, she was credited as Isabelle Olivier Lacamp, Isabelle Lacamp, Isabelle Olivier-Lacamp, and Isa Lacamp. She also practised in the dubbing of television series.

In 1987, she released a 45 rpm entitled Baby Bop.

Lacamp presented the cultural program Hors la ville on France 3 Limousin Poitou-Charentes for three years and for seven years co-organized the literary meetings of Ajaccio “Racines du ciel”.

Lacamp is best known as a writer, publishing bestselling novels. She released her first novel in 1986, Le Baiser du dragon.

Lacamp was a member of the jury for the Jean-Jacques-Rousseau Prize for autobiography.

=== Death ===
Lacamp died from cancer in Paris, on 26 June 2023, at the age of 68.

== Prizes ==
In 2003, she won the Cabri d'or from the Académie cévenole.

== Publications ==
- The Kiss of the Dragon, Lattes, 1986
- The Girl from Heaven, Albin Michel, 1988
- Spring Snow, co-written with Jean-Marie Galliand Albin Michel, 1988
- The Blue Elephant, Albin Michel, 1990
- Prunus flower in the land of magic gourds, co-written with Jean-Marie Galliand, Albin Michel, 1990
- A well-behaved young girl, Albin Michel, 1991
- Distant Paradises, co-written with Jean-Marie Galliand, LGF, 1993
- Kimono Nights, co-written with Jean-Marie Galliand, LGF, 1996
- Mambo Mambo, Ramsay, 1997
- Kensington Square, Ramsay, 1999
- The Man Without a Gun, Seuil, 2002 and Points, 2003
- Cévennes, colors of the world - photographs by Jean du Boisberranger -, Rouergue editions, 2003
- The Jealousy of Flowers, Seuil, 2004 and Points, 2005
- prefaced Scarecrows: Guardians of the Eternal by Sergio Cozzi, Equinoxe, 2006
- prefaced La Table d'ardoise, Sylvalonia 1959, by Yves Portier, Regain de lecture, 2008
- The Cloud Juggler, Flammarion, 2008
- Passport to Cheju, Elytis, 2010
- prefaced Living and Dying on the Banks of the Ganges, a photo book by Jean-François Lixon, L'Esprit du Monde, 2012
- Marie Durand: No to religious intolerance, Actes Sud, 2012
- Shadow Among Shadows, ed. Bruno Doucey, 2018 (about the last hours of the poet Robert Desnos).

== Filmography ==
=== Film ===
- 1975 : Emmanuelle l'antivierge, de Francis Giacobetti
- 1976 : L'Acrobate, de Jean-Daniel Pollet
- 1976 : Le Jardin des supplices, de Christian Gion : Annie
- 1980 : Je vous aime, de Claude Berri : Dorothée
- 1981 : Madame Claude 2, de François Mimet : la banquière à Hong-Kong
- 1983 : Le Marginal, de Jacques Deray : une prostituée
- 1983 : Adieu foulards, de Christian Lara : Michèle
- 1984 : Le Joli Cœur, de Francis Perrin : la fille du téléscope
- 1984 : Aldo et Junior, de Patrick Schulmann : la patronne du restaurant
- 1985 : Train d'enfer, de Roger Hanin
- 1989 : Pleure pas my love, de Tony Gatlif : Anne Eschenbrenner
- 1990 : Feu, Glace et Dynamite, de Willy Bogner : Li-Fah
- 1991 : La Tribu, de Yves Boisset : Tran

=== Television ===
==== Television films ====
- 1987 : Bonne chance Monsieur Pic ! de Maurice Failevic : la recruteuse
- 1988 : Un Cœur de marbre de Stéphane Kurc : Ghislaine

==== Television series ====
- 1980 : La Traque, de Philippe Lefèbvre : la belle compagne du juge
- 1982, De bien étranges affaires, épisode Lourde gueuse de Jean-Luc Miesch : Helvere
- 1983 : Les Cinq Dernières Minutes, épisode Appelez-moi Boggy de Jean-Pierre Marchand : l'assistante de Bernard
- 1983 : Les Enquêtes du commissaire Maigret, épisode La Colère de Maigret d'Alain Levent : Kim, une prostituée
- 1984 : La Pendule, de Éric Le Hung : Mademoiselle Garnier
- 1985 : Les Cinq Dernières Minutes, épisode Tendres pigeons de Louis Grospierre : Kyoko
- 1987 : Les Enquêtes du commissaire Maigret, épisode Maigret chez le ministre de Louis Grospierre : Blanche
- 1987 : Marc et Sophie - un épisode
- 1988 : Les Cinq Dernières Minutes, épisode Fais-moi cygne de Louis Grospierre : Marthe Darmond
- 1990 : Le Mari de l'Ambassadeur, de François Velle : le colonel Soubeyran
- 2002 : Fabio Montale de José Pinheiro - épisode Chourmo : Anh Hoa Fabre

=== Dubbing ===
- 1990 : Twin Peaks : Jocelyn « Josie » Packard - (actress : Joan Chen)
- 1981-1989 : Dynastie : Amanda Belford Carrington of Moldavia - (actresses : Catherine Oxenberg puis Karen Cellini)
- 1991 : Capitaine Planète (série d'animation) : Gi

== Bibliography ==
- Catherine Bernié-Boissard, Michel Boissard et Serge Velay (2009). Petit dictionnaire des écrivains du Gard (in French). Nîmes: Alcide. pp. 135–136.
- Patrick Cabanel, « Lacamp Ysabelle », dans Patrick Cabanel et André Encrevé (dir.), Dictionnaire biographique des Protestants français de 1787 à nos jours : H-L, t. III, Paris-Max Chaleil, 2022 (ISBN 978-2-84621-333-2), p. 547–548.
