= Eaucourt-sur-Somme =

- Commune
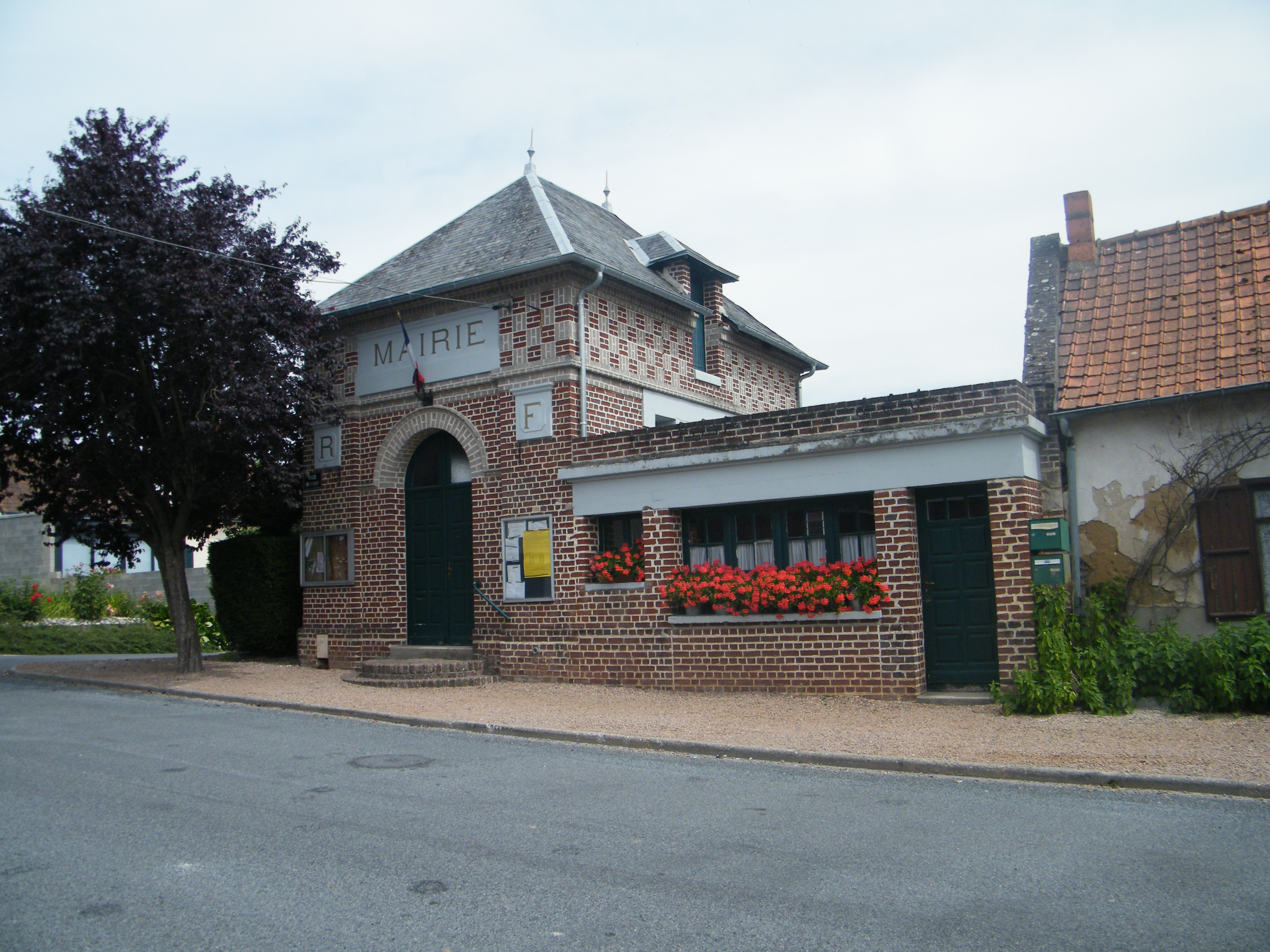
- Town hall
- Location of Eaucourt-sur-Somme
- Location within France Location within Hauts-de-France
- Coordinates: 50°03′54″N 1°53′10″E
- Country: France
- Region: Hauts-de-France
- Department: Somme
- Arrondissement: Abbeville
- Canton: Abbeville-2
- Intercommunality: Baie de Somme

Government
  - Mayor (2020–2026): Henri Sannier
- Area^{1}: 4.42 km^{2} (1.71 sq mi)
- Elevation: 7 m (23 ft)
- Highest elevation: 103 m (338 ft)
- Lowest elevation: 6 m (20 ft)
- Population (2023): 357
  - Density: 80.8/km^{2} (209/sq mi)
- Time zone: UTC+01:00 (CET)
  - Summer (DST): UTC+02:00 (CEST)
- INSEE/Postal code: 80262 /80580
- ^{1} French Land Register data, which excludes lakes, ponds, glaciers > 1 km^{2} (0.386 sq mi or 247 acres) and river estuaries.

Eaucourt-sur-Somme (French pronunciation: [okuʁ syʁ sɔm], literally Eaucourt on Somme; Picard: Yucourt-dsu-Sonme) is a commune in the Somme department in Hauts-de-France in northern France.

== Geography ==
The commune is situated 4 miles (6 km) southeast of Abbeville on the D901 and by the banks of the river Somme.

== History ==
The etymology of the name "Eaucourt". One of many towns in Picardie where the name ends in ‘court’. This dates back to the Middle Ages, when a manor was enlarged by the building of smaller houses around it in a ‘court’. ‘Eau’ is ‘water’.

The town of Eaucourt-sur-Somme appears to have been founded in the 7th or 8th century as part of the possessions of the Abbey of St Riquier. By usurpation, or by concession, Eaucourt passed into the hands of the lords of Ferté, at that time, the Châtillons family.

The castle was first constructed in the 13th century, since the diocesan Pouillé of 1301 talks about the chapel of Saint Margherite and the castle. He called it "Aqua curte". The castle construction was carried out by the lords of the Ferté in response to the wishes of King Philippe II (Augustus) (1165–1223) to fortify towns in order to defend the newly conquered territory.

Around 1358, during the imprisonment of King John the Good of France, municipal troops of Abbeville demolished the castle to prevent the English any means to establish themselves in the region. Rebuilt soon after, in 1420, by Simon of Boulainvilliers, it was subsequently fought over by the kings of France and England (and the Burgundians) and left in ruins.

The castle was rebuilt in 1436 by John of Eaucourt, who chose to live here. 4 years later it was pillaged by Pierre Renaud of Vignolles in 1440, who put the lord of Eaucourt to ransom.

In 1575, the seigneurie of Eaucourt was held by Françoise of Soyecourt.

In 1589, during the French Wars of Religion, the leaguers of Abbeville attacked the troops of King Henry IV of France and took possession of the castle.

In 1700, the seigneurie of Eaucourt was held by the Dame of Belleforière-Soyecourt.

In 1755, by Joachim-Charles de Seiglière de Belleforière.

In 1777, by François Valliant, knight, who bought the castle and lived there until 1779. This is the last time anyone used it as a home.

In 1983, Damien Maupin founded the Association for the Restoration of the Chateau d’Eaucourt (ARCH) and organized the first restoration work.

== Places of interest ==
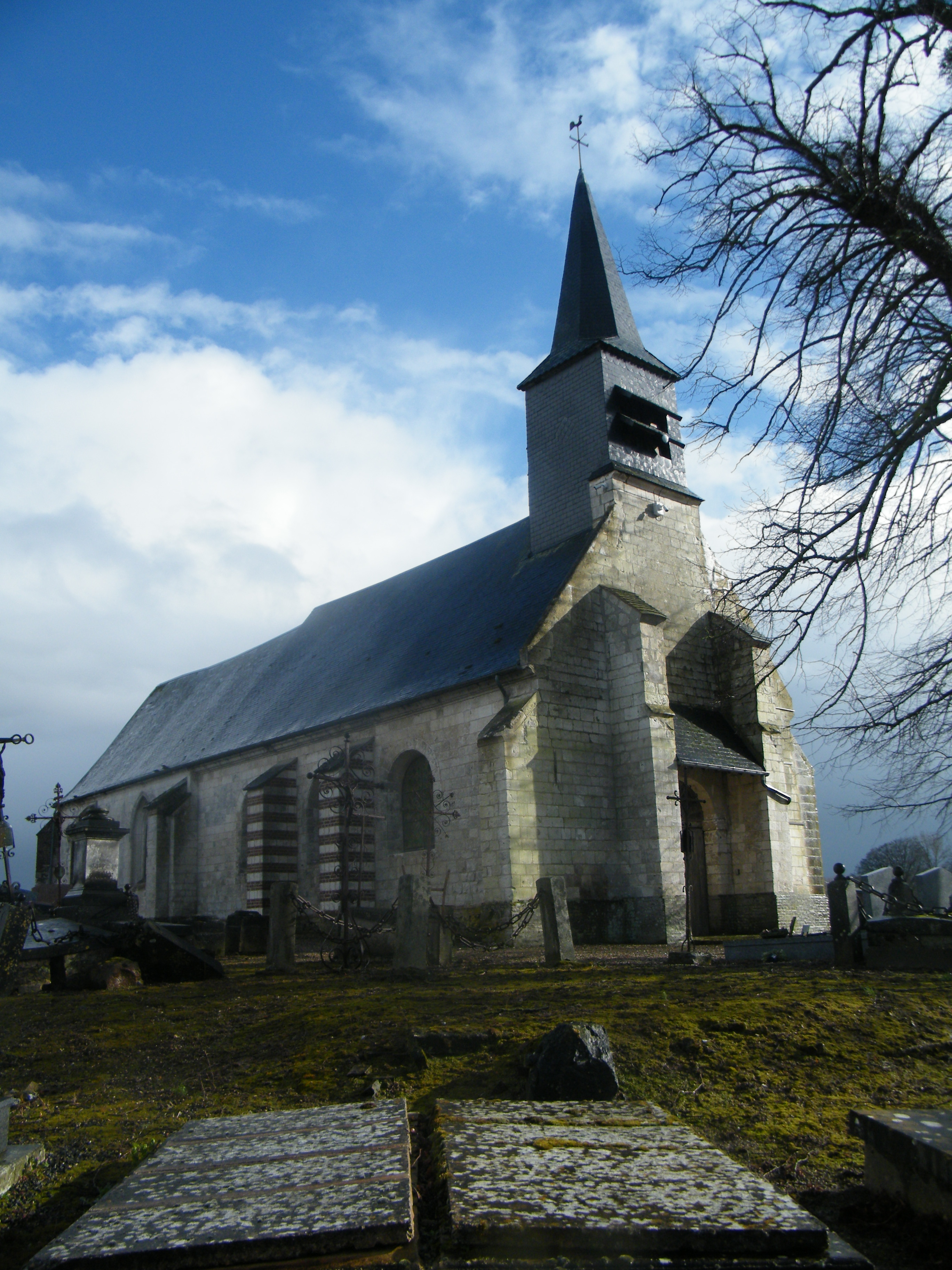
St Aubin church

- The church
- The windmill (rebuilt by the community)
- The Château

== Personalities ==
- Henri Sannier, the mayor since 1977, is also a well-known French television sports reporter.

== Population ==
Historical population
| Year | Pop. | ±% p.a. |
|---|---|---|
| 1968 | 307 | — |
| 1975 | 365 | +2.50% |
| 1982 | 396 | +1.17% |
| 1990 | 414 | +0.56% |
| 1999 | 376 | −1.06% |
| 2007 | 381 | +0.17% |
| 2012 | 411 | +1.53% |
| 2017 | 424 | +0.62% |
| 2023 | 357 | −2.83% |
Source: INSEE

== See also ==
- Communes of the Somme department
