= Henri Sannier =

French sports journalist and television presenter (born 1947)

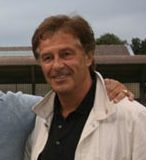
- Henri Sannier
- Born: 7 September 1947 (age 78); Puteaux, Hauts-de-Seine, France
- Occupations: Sports journalist, television presenter
- Years active: 1973–present
- Television: Journal de 20 heures Journal de 13 heures (France 2); Soir 3 (France 3); Tout le sport (France 3)

Henri Sannier (French pronunciation: [ɑ̃ʁi sanje]; born 7 September 1947) is a French sports journalist and television presenter.

== Life and career ==
Henri Sannier was born in Puteaux in the department of Hauts-de-Seine. He graduated at the École supérieure de journalisme de Paris.

He created the 19/20 in 1986 on the channel FR3 and became the host of the Journal de 20 heures on the channel Antenne 2 from September 1987 to September 1992. He then co-hosted the Journal de 13 heures on France 2 in duet with Laurence Piquet until September 1993 and alone until January 1994. He also hosted Soir 3 until September 1997, the evening news on France 3.

Since 1994, he hosts the sports magazine Tout le sport on France 3. He is currently the chief editor of the program and was honored of it by a 7 d'Or in 2001. He is also the managing director of France Télévisions.

As a cycling enthusiast, he commentated the Tour de France in 2005 with Laurent Jalabert and in 2006 with Laurent Fignon. Henri Sannier knew that he would not comment the Tour de France in 2007. However, he accepted to host Journal du Tour in the evening and Avant le Tour, a program before the beginning of the cycling race.

Sannier was heavily involved with Téléthon en France, undertaking several counts of road bicycle racing for the live television shows. These included Bordeaux—Paris, Berlin—Paris and in 1994 London—Paris. On the night of 2/3 December 1994 Sannier and a peloton of cyclists took their bikes in the Channel Tunnel, cycling via the service tunnel between Folkestone and Coquelles as part of the route for Téléthon en France '94. He was accompanied by Jean-Michel Guidez, Patrick Chêne, Jean Mamère, Marc Toesca and others.

In 2006, he published a book with Emmanuel Galiero titled Les histoires secrètes du Tour de France.

Henri Sannier is also the mayor of Eaucourt-sur-Somme since 1977, and the president of the association of the Festival de l'oiseau et de la nature.

== Personal life ==
Henri Sannier is married and has two children, Antoine and Emmanuelle.
