= Habiba Dembélé =

Ivorian journalist

Habiba Dembélé Sahouet
- Citizenship: Ivory Coast
- Occupation(s): Journalist, TV presenter

Habiba Dembélé Sahouet is an Ivorian journalist and television presenter.

She is currently presenter of TV news 13 heures and 20 heures on the La Première (RTI) main channel, centered in Abidjan.

On February 11, 2008, a fire broke out in the studios while she was filming for 20 heures, forcing her to abandon her presenting and flee the building. The fire destroyed several studios but was generally controlled by firefighters.
