= Max Olivier-Lacamp =

French journalist (1914–1983)

Max Olivier-Lacamp (2 March 1914 Le Havre – 17 June 1983 Meudon) was a French journalist and writer, winner of the Prix Renaudot in 1969, and Albert Londres Prize in 1958.

== Biography ==
Max Olivier, also known as Max-Olivier Lacamp, was a reporter for Le Figaro and reported on the Partition of India, in 1947. His book, Between the two Asias, is devoted to the difference between Asian Indian and Far East.

== Family ==
He lived in Korea, and married Pyong-You Hyun. He is the father of the writer Ysabelle Lacamp.

== Works ==
- Les Feux de la colère, Bernard Grasset, 1969, Prix Renaudot.
- Le Kief, B. Grasset, 1974, ISBN 978-2-246-00055-6
- Le matin calme : Corée d'hier et d'aujourd'hui , Stock, 1977, ISBN 978-2-234-00668-3
- Les chemins de Montvézy, Grasset, 1981, ISBN 978-2-246-27291-5
