= France 3 Centre =

- Logo used since 2018
- Country: France
- Broadcast area: Centre-Val de Loire
- Headquarters: Orléans

Ownership
- Owner: France Télévisions

History
- Launched: 1964
- Former names: FR3 Paris Île-de-France Centre (1975–1992); France 3 Paris Île-de-France Centre (1992–2010)

Links
- Website: centre.france3.fr

France 3 Centre is one of France 3's regional services broadcasting to people in the Centre-Val de Loire region. It was founded in 1964 as FR3 Paris Île-de-France Centre.The service is headquartered in Orléans, the capital of the region. Programming is also produced by France 3 Centre.

== Presenters ==
- Delphine Cros
- Wafa Dahman
- Guy Bensimon
- Alain-Georges Emonet
- Alain Heudes
- Bérénice Du Failly
- Pierre Bouchenot
- Antony Masteau
- Jocelyne Thuet
- Christophe Carin

== Programming ==
- Ici Matin Centre
- Ici 12/13 Centre
- Ici 19/20 Centre
- Ici 19/20 Édition Berry
- Ici 19/20 Édition Orléans Loiret
- Ici 19/20 Édition Touraine Val de Loire

== See also ==
- France 3
