= Benoît Duquesne =

French journalist (1957–2014)

- Born: 19 July 1957; Roubaix, Nord, France
- Died: 4 July 2014 (aged 56); L'Île-Saint-Denis, Seine-Saint-Denis, France
- Occupations: Journalist, news anchor
- Years active: 1983–2014
- Employer(s): Europe 1 (1982–88); TF1 (1988–94); France 2 (1994–2014)
- Notable credit(s): Journal de 13 heures Complément d'enquête

Benoît Duquesne (19 July 1957 – 4 July 2014) was a French journalist, television reporter and newscaster. He worked as presenter of the news magazine Complément d'enquête from 2007 until his death. He also was anchor of the Journal de 13 heures on France 2 from January to July 2005.

== Early life and education ==
His family was from Wasquehal and originally came from Glageon. His father, Gérard Duquesne, was a doctor and the mayor of the town, and had seven children. Benoît Duquesne was educated at the primary school of Couplevoie and at the Lycée Saint-Joseph of Reims for his secondary studies. After graduating with a degree in law, he studied at the ESJ (École supérieure de journalisme) of Lille where he graduated in 1983.

== Television career ==
From 1982 to 1988, he was a reporter on Europe 1, and then joined TF1 until 1994. He worked for the news magazines A la une, Le Droit de savoir and Reportages. From 1994 to 1997, he was a stand-in news anchor on France 2. On the evening of the second round of the French presidential election of 1995, live on France 2, he rode a motorcycle chasing winner Jacques Chirac's car in the streets of Paris, in the attempt to secure an interview. He was then a reporter at France 2 until 1999. From 1995 to 2000, he was the channel's correspondent in London. From 2000 to 2001, he was promoted to editor-in-chief.

From September 2001 until his death, he was the host of the investigation magazine Complément d'enquête on France 2. From January to July 2005, he anchored the Journal de 13 heures on the same channel after the sudden departure of Christophe Hondelatte. In September 2007, he was named news editor on Europe 1. He was fired in July 2008 by Alexandre Bompard.

== Death ==
Benoît Duquesne died of a heart attack, in his houseboat of L'Île-Saint-Denis, Seine-Saint-Denis on July 4, 2014. His funeral was celebrated on July 10, 2014, at the Église Sainte-Jeanne-d'Arc in Versailles.

== Personal life ==
Benoît Duquesne was the father of four children. His daughter, Marie Duquesne, is a journalist on BFM TV.

== Television programs ==
- 1992–94 : À la une, Le Droit de savoir and Reportages on France 2
- 1994–99 : replacing presenter of the news on France 2
- 2001–14 : Complément d'enquête on France 2
- 2005 : Journal de 13 heures on France 2
