= Envoyé spécial =

- Country of origin: France
- Original language: French

Envoyé spécial (English: Special correspondent) is a French television weekly investigative newsmagazine show that has run on channel France 2 since 1990. It has been presented by Élise Lucet since 2016.
