= France 3 Aquitaine =

- Logo used since 2018
- Country: France
- Broadcast area: Nouvelle-Aquitaine; Aquitaine
- Headquarters: Bordeaux

Programming
- Languages: French, Basque, and Occitan

Ownership
- Owner: France Télévisions

History
- Launched: 1962
- Former names: FR3 Aquitaine

Links
- Website: France 3 Aquitaine

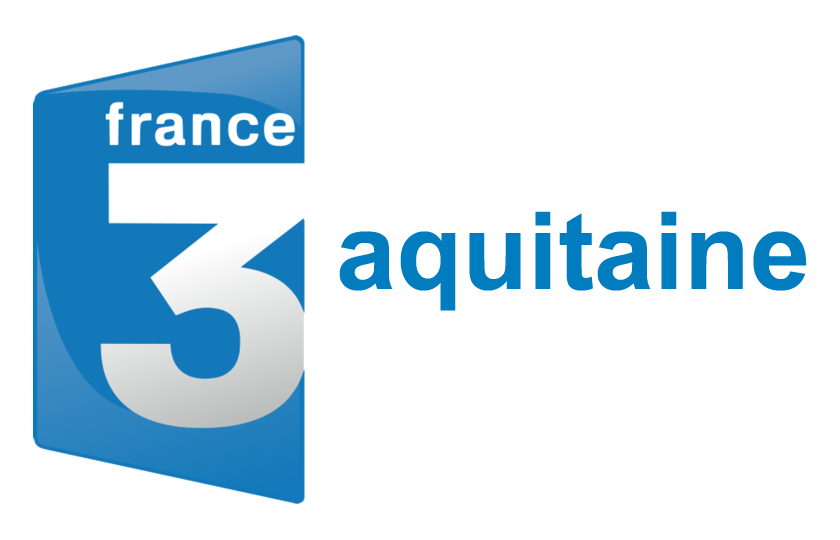
France 3 Aquitaine's sixth logo from 2008 to 2011

France 3 Aquitaine (Occitan: França 3 Aquitània) is one of France 3's regional services broadcasting to people in the Nouvelle-Aquitaine region. It was founded in 1962.The service is headquartered in Bordeaux, the city of the region, along with newsrooms in Bayonne, Pau, Périgueux, Mont-de-Marsan, Agen, Dax, and Arcachon. The channel is available in French, Basque, and Occitan audio tracks. France 3 Aquitaine also produces content.

== Presenters ==
- Sandrine Papin
- Eric Perrin
- Frédérique Lillet
- Vincent Dubroca
- Thierry Blancot
- Denis Salles
- Serge Guynier
- Totte Darguy
- Marie-Pierre D'abrigeon
- Fabrice Goll
- Nicolas Morin
- Pascal Cagnato

== Programming ==
- Côté cuisine
- J'aime beaucoup ce que vous faites
- Le mag' du Pays Basque
- Sport Aq
- Punt de vista
- La voix est libre
- Samedi le matin

== See also ==
- France 3
