= France 3 Bourgogne =

- Logo used since 2018
- Country: France
- Broadcast area: Bourgogne-Franche-Comté; Burgundy
- Headquarters: Dijon

Programming
- Language(s): French and Burgundian

Ownership
- Owner: France Télévisions

History
- Launched: 15 November 1965; 59 years ago
- Former names: FR3 Bourgogne Franche-Comté (1965–1992); France 3 Bourgogne Franche-Comté (1992–2010)

Links
- Website: France 3 Bourgogne

France 3 Bourgogne is one of France 3's regional services broadcasting to people in the Burgundy region. It was founded in 1965 as FR3 Bourgogne Franche-Comté. Its headquarters are in Dijon, the city of the region. The channel is available in French and Burgundian audio tracks. France 3 Bourgogne also produces content as well.

== Programming ==
- Z@ppez+Net
- Impressions
- Les documentaires
- Le monde est petit
- Fugues
- La voix est libre
- Naturbis
- ça manque pas d'air
- Ici 19/20 Bourgogne
- Ici 12/13 Bourgogne

== See also ==
- France 3
