= France 3 Alsace =

Coordinates: 48°35′40″N 7°45′30″E

- Logo used since 2018
- Country: France
- Broadcast area: Grand Est; Alsace
- Headquarters: Strasbourg

Ownership
- Owner: France Télévisions

History
- Launched: October 15, 1953; 73 years ago
- Former names: RTF Télé-Strasbourg (1953–1964); ORTF Télé-Strasbourg (1964–1975); FR3 Alsace (1975–1992)

Links
- Website: france3-regions.francetvinfo.fr/grand-est/

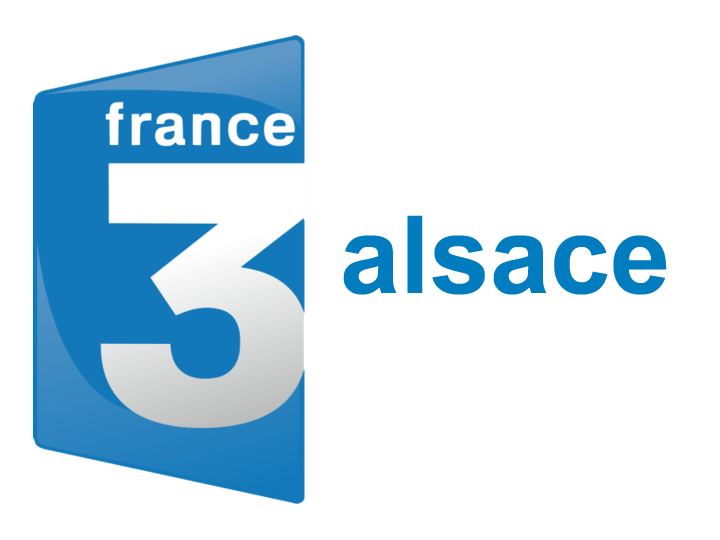
France 3 Alsace's logo from 2008 to 2011

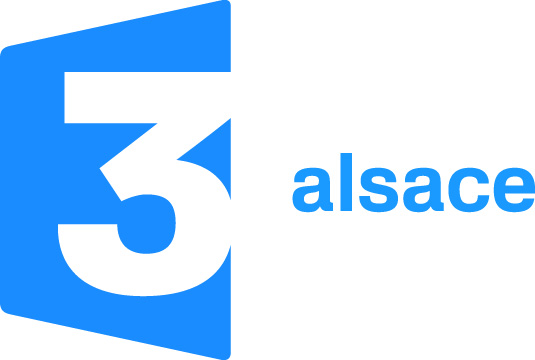
France 3 Alsace's seventh and previous logo from 2017 to 2018

France 3 Alsace is a regional television service and part of the France 3 network. Serving the Alsace region from its headquarters in Strasbourg with another newsroom in Mulhouse. France 3 Alsace produces regional news, sport, features and entertainment programming.

== History ==
RTF Télé-Strasbourg began broadcasting on 15 October 1953. In 1964, RTF was replaced with ORTF by the government, with RTF Télé-Strasbourg becoming ORTF Télé-Strasbourg. After the de-establishment of ORTF on 6 January 1975, ORTF Télé-Strasbourg became FR3 Alsace. Following the establishment of France Télévisions on 7 September 1992, FR3 Alsace was rebranded France 3 Alsace.

== Programming ==
=== News ===
France 3 Alsace produces two daily region-wide news programmes - a 15 to 20-minute bulletin (midi-pile) at 1200 CET during Ici 12/13 and the main half-hour news at 1900 during Ici 19/20. Two 10-minute sub-regional bulletins, Strasbourg-Deux Rives (serving Bas-Rhin) and France 3 Haute-Alsace (serving Haut-Rhin) are broadcast during Ici 19/20 at 1900 CET.

Rund um, a short bulletin in the Alsatian language with French subtitles, is also aired each weekday after the regional Ici 12/13 bulletin.

On 5 January 2009, a 5-minute late night bulletin was introduced, forming part of Soir 3.

== Non-news programming ==
- Triangle
- C'est mieux le matin
- Vis à vis
- 7 jours en Alsace et Le Mag (Current affairs debate)
- Européos (programme on Europe and European institutions)
- Sportshow (a weekly sport programme)
- La voix est libre (debate show)
- Gsuntheim (Alsatian-language weekend magazine)
- Sür un Siess (cooking programme, also in Alsatian)

== Capital ==
France 3 Alsace has an annual budget of €20.4 million (£14.3 m, $29.3 m) (roughly 2% of the national budget of France 3).

== Broadcast area ==
As well as the target coverage area of Alsace, France 3 Alsace also broadcasts to Basel in Switzerland and parts of Baden-Württemberg and Rhineland-Palatinate in Germany, counting to an overall potential audience of around 2.5 million people (including 1.8 million in Alsace).
