= Élise Lucet =

French journalist (born 1963)

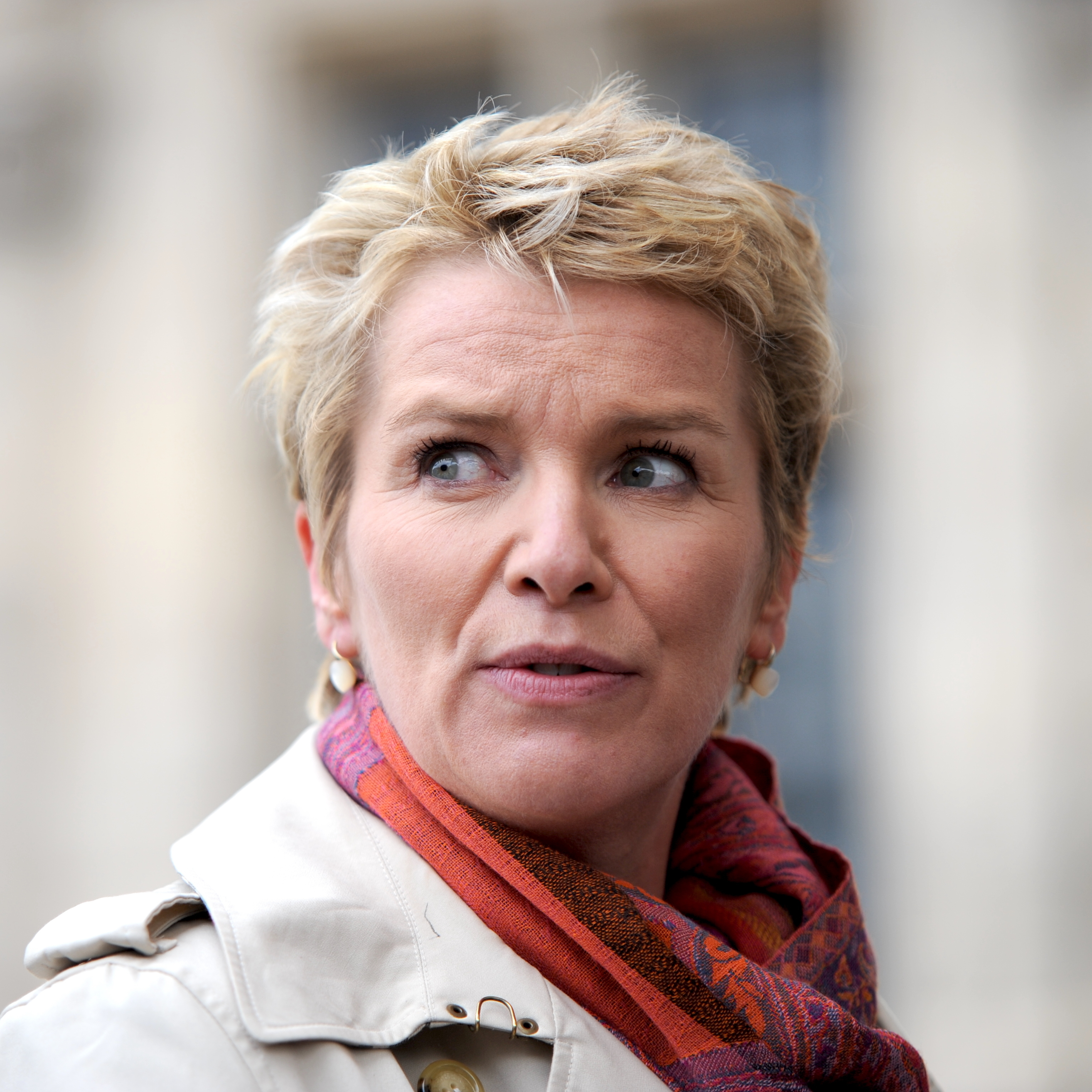
- Lucet in 2010
- Born: 30 May 1963 (age 63); Rouen, France
- Occupations: Journalist, television presenter
- Years active: 1983–present
- Employer(s): France 3 (1983–2005); France 2 (2005–present)
- Spouse: Martin Bourgeois (2006–2011)
- Children: 1 daughter

Élise Lucet (French pronunciation: [eliz lysɛ]; born 30 May 1963) is a French journalist and television host. Known for her investigative journalism work on France Télévisions shows such as Pièces à Conviction, Cash Investigation and Envoyé spécial, she has been dubbed France's "incorruptible journalist". In 2008, she was named Knight of the Legion of Honour. Lucet's work for Cash Investigation garnered her and her crew around twenty international awards including a Pulitzer Prize in 2017 for their investigation on the Panama Papers.

== Early years ==
Élise Lucet was born in Rouen, Seine-Maritime. Her father is a teacher and her mother a school director. She has a sister. Lucet began her career under Henri Sannier on the Caen affiliate of France 3 in 1983. She subsequently worked for Sygma TV and the public service radio station France Inter. In 1990, she became the host of the 19/20 evening news on France 3. In 1997, she became its lead editor.

== Investigative journalism ==
As a writer and television producer, Lucet hosted Pièces à Conviction from 2000 until 2011. In 2005, she left 19/20 to host 13 heures le journal on France 2. In 2012, she began hosting Cash Investigation, an investigative television programme; she has also hosted Envoyé spécial since 2016.

=== Controversies ===
Cash Investigation brought to light some controversies:

- In June 2012, the World Wildlife Fund (WWF) sued France 2 to prevent broadcast of an interview of the NGO's management. The courts ruled in favour of France 2.
- In October 2013, the programme revealed that the Government of France had fined the training arm of gardening company Jardiland 3.2 million euros in September 2012, with regards to fraudulent transactions concerning hundreds of false training certificates issued between 2007 and 2011. The certificates allowed Jardiland to illegally receive subsidies from professional training organisations. Jardiland announced it would bring a defamation suit against France Télévisions, publicly accusing the Cash Investigation report of presenting false information. In April 2015, Jardiland withdrew its suit.
- In 2015, Rachida Dati criticised the broadcast for raising questions about a possible link between herself and the Engie corporation (formerly GDF-Suez).
- In 2015, Élise Lucet took part in a demonstration by the collective named "Informer n’est pas un délit" (English: Informing is not a crime) against a proposed French law about trade secrets, an amendment to the Loi pour la croissance, l'activité et l'égalité des chances économiques (Law for growth, activity and equality of economic opportunity), known as the "Loi Macron". She opposed the measure because it would hamper the production of broadcasts like Cash Investigation. A book was published in 2015.
- After the 2 February 2016 broadcast of Produits chimiques, nos enfants en danger (Chemical products, our children in danger), the Association française pour l'information scientifique (AFIS; French Association for Scientific Information) issued a press release claiming that the documentary misled viewers. It cited a summary written by the European Food Safety Authority, briefly referred to at the beginning of the show, which stated: "More than 97% of foods contain pesticide residues within legal limits; 54.6 of these contain no detectable trace". Several weeks later the AFIS returned to the subject, in a more detailed article, Comment les téléspectateurs ont été abusés par 'Cash Investigation'.
- In July 2016, the Conseil supérieur de l'audiovisuel (France's media regulatory body), at the request of members of the National Assembly, published a decision relating to the file of investigation on pesticides. The board "regretted that journalists misrepresented that a study by the European Food Safety Authority had revealed that 97% of foodstuffs contained residues of pesticides" and asked France Télévisions to "respect their obligations regarding rigour in the presentation and processing of information". In October 2016, the EFSA published its new annual report on pesticide residues in foods. Following the controversy, it changed the technical terms of its report: this time there is no question of detection limit (LOD) in pesticide residues but of limit of quantification of pesticide residues (LOQ).
- In October 2016, the first deputy to the Mayor of Nice, Christian Estrosi, contradicted an investigation's claims relating to the cost and the use of the Allianz Riviera, a newly built stadium. A dedicated website was made to back Estrosi's counter-claims. Lucet and Estrosi vigorously opposed each other at the end of the show.
- In March 2017, the Conference of Bishops of France complained about the "accusatory methods of the show's journalists" when pressed on issues of pedophilia in the Catholic Church; and that they had not talked much about the "recent measures taken by the Church to prevent and punish these acts". Lucet went to the Vatican to try to talk to Pope Francis.

=== Viewership ===
Her pugnacity and daring attitude are appreciated by spectators. Her show regularly achieves record viewership numbers for a news programme; she was elected favourite TV host of France in October 2017.

== Career ==
=== Television ===
- 1983–1986: journalist on FR3 Caen
- 1987: journalist on Sygma TV
- 1987–1988: regular guest on La Marche du siècle on France 2
- 1988–2005: host and editor of 19/20 on France 3
- 1994–2000: host and editor of Science 3 on France 3
- 2000: host of the documentary Viols d'enfants : la fin du silence ? on France 3
- 2000–2011: host of Pièces à Conviction on France 3
- 2002: host of Quand je serai président on France 3
- 2005–2016: host and editor of 13 heures on France 2
- 2008: host of À nos 100 ans ! on France 2
- 2012–present: host of Cash Investigation on France 2
- 2016–present: host of Envoyé spécial on France 2

=== Film ===
Year	Title	Role	Director
2016	150 Milligrams	Herself	Emmanuelle Bercot

== Accolades ==
The audiovisual club of Paris awarded her the 2014 Laurier of the TV magazine for Cash Investigation. The same year, she won the yearly International Press (Television) Grand Prize for "her entire career in international news and for excellence and courage in the treatment of international issues in Cash Investigation". Anti-corruption association Anticor later awarded Lucet its 2015 Ethics Price.

== Personal life ==
Lucet and Martin Bourgeois, an antiquarian, were married in 2006. They had a daughter, Rose. Bourgeois died of leukemia in 2011.

Preceded by Paul Amar	Host of 19/20 on France 3; 1988–2005	Succeeded by Audrey Pulvar
Preceded by Benoît Duquesne	Host of 13 heures le journal on France 2; 2005–2016	Succeeded by Marie-Sophie Lacarrau
