= Télématin =

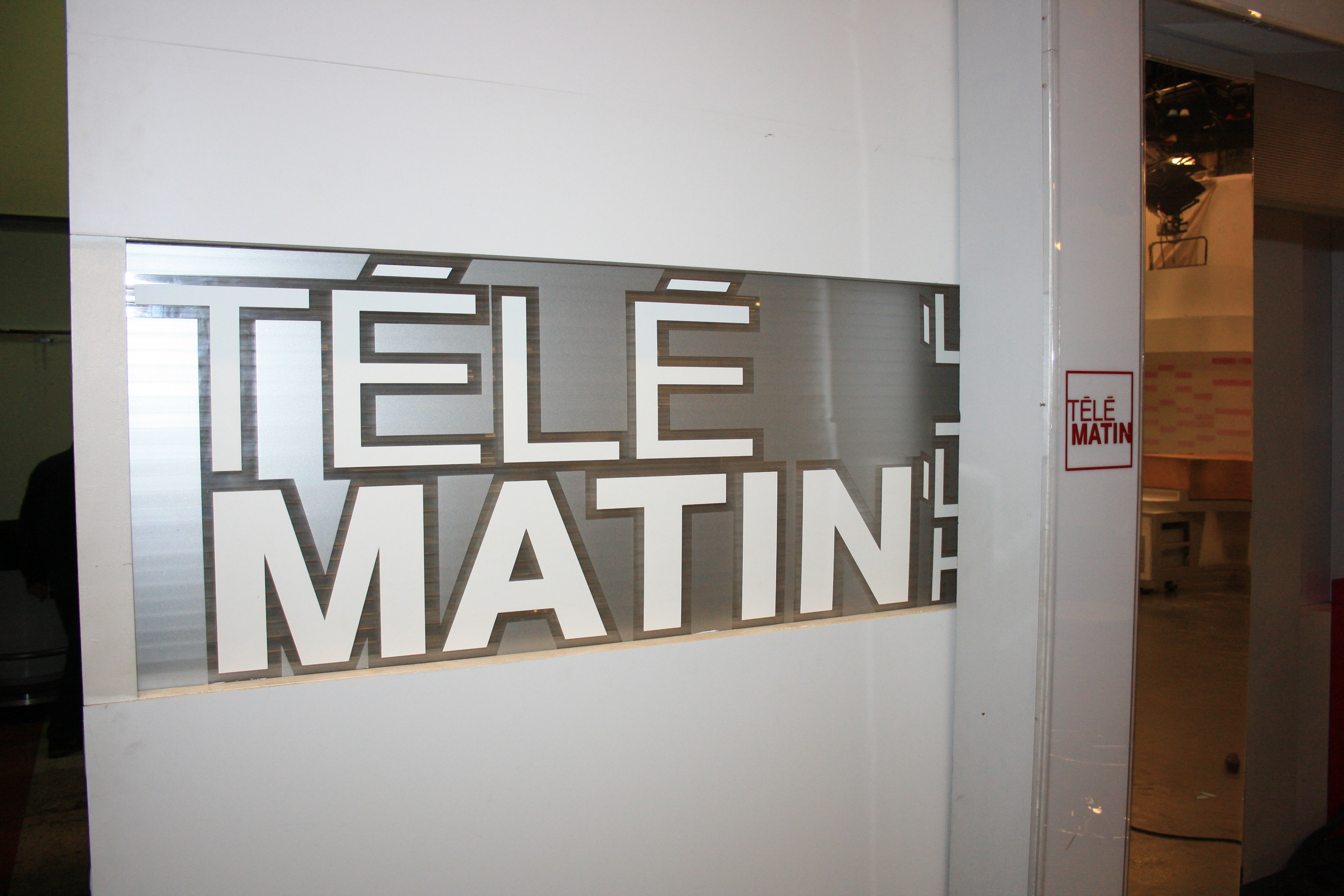
- Logo at the station in Paris in 2011
- Genre: Morning; News
- Created by: William Leymergie
- Inspired by: Today
- Presented by: Maya Lauqué (weekdays edition) (6:30-9:15); Agathe Lecaron (weekdays edition) (9:15-10:40); Mélanie Taravant and Samuel Ollivier (weekend edition)
- Opening theme: "Don't Stop Me Now" by Queen
- Ending theme: "Don't Stop Me Now" by Queen
- Country of origin: France
- Original language: French
- No. of seasons: 41

Production
- Production locations: France Télévisions - Studio B, Paris
- Running time: 205 minutes (weekdays) (2025-2026); 180 minutes (Saturdays); 120 minutes (Sundays)

Original release
- Network: Antenne 2 (1985–1992)
- Release: 10 January 1985 – 4 September 1992
- Network: France 2 (1992–present)
- Release: 7 September 1992 – present

Télématin is a French breakfast television news show, broadcast on France 2 since 7 January 1985. It is broadcast in Metropolitan France weekdays from 6:30 to 9:55 am CET/CEST. TV5 broadcast the show in Canada in its 150-minute entirety until September 2011: since then, a shortened 90-minute version is shown between 6:30 and 8:00 am Eastern Time.

Télématin has been hosted for its entire run by William Leymergie, who also serves as the show's producer. The show is daily seen by around 40% of the French morning audience, a very high percentage for French TV.

In Metropolitan France, newscasts are presented at 7:00, 7:30 and 8:00, with newsflashes at 6:30 and 8:50, and two press reviews at 7:20 and 8:30. The 6:30, 7:30 and 8:50 newscasts are usually presented by a female reader and the hourly newscasts by a male. The usual readers are Nathanaël de Rincquesen, Sophie Le Saint, Julien Benedetto, Sophie Gastrain, Patrice Romedenne and Frédéric Vion.
