= Hervé Claude =

French journalist and writer

- Born: 19 November 1945 (age 80); Paris, France
- Occupations: Romancier, journalist
- Writing career
- Genre: Crime novels

Hervé Claude (born 19 November 1945 in Paris) is a French television journalist and writer.

== Biography ==
Hervé Claude was a news anchor for Antenne 2 and France 2 from 1975 to 1994. He has worked since this date on Arte. He hosted the religious program Agape one Sunday a month, on France 2 in connection with the religious show The day of the Lord until January 2010 and from May 2010 in a shorter form (the show shortened from 52 to 26 minutes).

Hervé Claude wrote a dozen novels. Requins et Coquins is the second in the noir book series after Riches, cruels et fardés. In September 2007, he released the last volume of the trilogy Mort d'une drag-queen. He also published a noir crime novel collection under the title number 24 entitled Cocu de sac. A Television journalist, he mainly works for Arte and he lives several months a year in Australia.

Hervé Claude was married from 1972 to 1976 to Françoise Kramer since then he is in a civil union with sculptor Matei Negreanu.

== Works ==
=== Novels ===
- Conduite à gauche, Ramsay, 1984
  Réédition Le Livre de Poche n^{o} 4366
- L'Enfant à l'oreille cassée, Ramsay, 1986
  Réédition J'ai lu n^{o} 2753
- Le Désespoir des singes, Flammarion, 1989
  Réédition J'ai lu n^{o} 2788
- Le Jeu de la rue du Loup, Flammarion, 1992
- Les Amnésiques, Flammarion, 1995
- Le Journaliste, le Hasard et la Guenon, Seuil, 1996
- Une image irréprochable, Ramsay, 1998
- Riches, cruels et fardés, Gallimard, coll. "Série noire", 2002
  Réédition Gallimard, coll. "Folio policier" n^{o} 511
- Requins et Coquins, Gallimard, coll. " Série noire", 2003
- Pique-nique à marée basse, 2007
- Mort d'une drag-queen, Actes Sud, coll. "Babel noir" n^{o} 12, 2007
- Cocu de sac, La Branche, coll. "Suite noire", 2008
- Nickel chrome, Actes Sud, coll. " Actes noirs", 2009
- Les ours s'embrassent pour mourir, Actes Sud, coll. " Actes noirs", 2010
- Mort d'un papy voyageur, Baleine, coll. "Le Poulpe" n^{o} 271, 2010
- Les Mâchoires du serpent, Actes Sud, coll. "Actes noirs", 2012

=== Other ===
- Matei Negreanu, Vers les arts, 1993
  Cowritten with Dominique Narran and Helmut Ricke.
