= France 3 Midi-Pyrénées =

- Logo used since 2018
- Country: France
- Broadcast area: Occitanie
- Headquarters: Toulouse

Ownership
- Owner: France Télévisions

History
- Launched: 1975
- Former names: FR3 Sud (1975–1992)

Links
- Website: sud.france3.fr

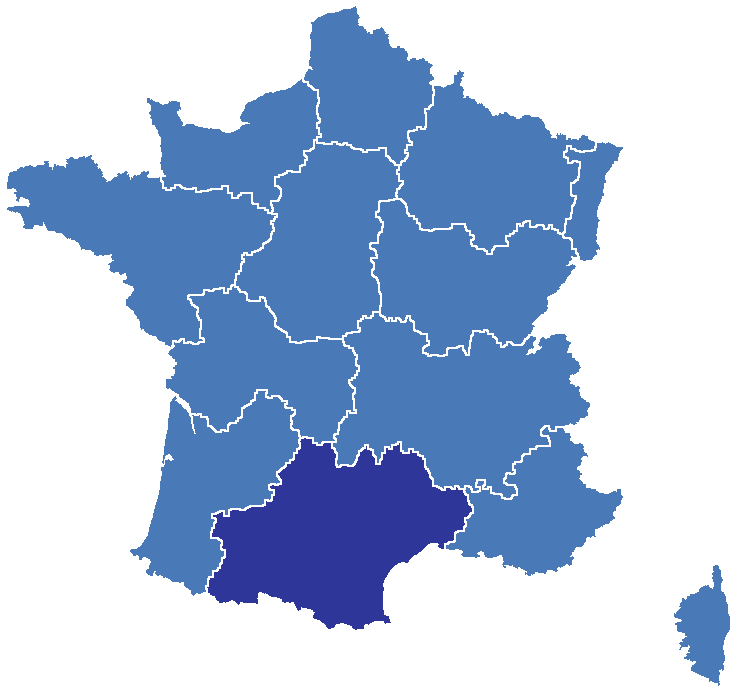
France 3 Sud region map

France 3 Midi-Pyrénées is a regional television service and part of the France 3 network. Serving the Occitanie regions from its headquarters in Toulouse, secondary production centre in Montpellier and newsrooms in Perpignan, Rodez, Albi and Nîmes, France 3 Sud broadcasts regional news, sport, features and entertainment programming in French, Occitan and Catalan.

== History ==
In 1975 FR3 Sud was launched. Following the establishment of France Télévisions on 7 September 1992, FR3 Sud was rebranded to France 3 Sud.

== Programming ==
=== News ===
France 3 Sud produces daily news programmes for its two sub-regions - programming for the Midi-Pyrénées sub-region is produced in Toulouse, with the Languedoc-Roussillon sub-region receiving programming from Montpellier. Each sub-region produces a 27-minute bulletin (midi-pile) at 1200 CET during Ici 12/13 and the main news at 1900 during Ici 19/20. Six 10-minute local bulletins serving the Toulouse, Pays Catalan, Montpellier, Quercy-Rouergue, Tarn and Pays Gardois areas are broadcast during Ici 19/20 at 1900 CET.

On 5 January 2009, a 5-minute late night bulletin was introduced, forming part of Soir 3.

On some weekends and holiday periods, as well as during major events, the Midi-Pyrénées and Languedoc-Roussillon news bulletins are combined into pan-regional "Sud" editions.

=== Non-news programmes ===
- Viure al pais, programme in Occitan and Catalan.
- C'est mieux le matin. breakfast programme.
- Le Mag, information programme.
- Rugby Magazine
- Sud Courses
