= 13 heures =

Journal de 13 heures or 13 heures (French: The 1 pm Journal, stylized on-screen as 13h) is France 2's afternoon news program, seen weekdays at 1:00 pm (13:00) Central European Time in Metropolitan France. It has been broadcast since 1981.

This France 2 news program is seen opposite the similarly named news program on commercial broadcaster TF1, TF1 13 Heures, which has twice the viewership of France 2's program. As a result, France 2's 13 heures has seen a frequent turnover of news anchors for the program—15 in the last ten years.

Élise Lucet host the 13 heures from 2005 to 2016.

More generally, many French television channels offer a newscast at or around 1:00 pm: TF1, France 2, France 3, C8 and M6. In Belgium, La Une broadcasts a news bulletin at 1:00 pm, as well as La Première (RTI) in Ivory Coast. Ivorian presenters of the series include Habiba Dembélé, Awa Ehoura, Alberic Niango, Pascal Aka Brou, David Mobio, Lanciné Fofana, Viviane Ahimain and Amidou Doukouré.

In the United Kingdom, an equivalent newscast is the BBC News at One, shown at 1:00 pm UK time and formerly anchored by George Alagiah.

It is also shown on SBS in Australia 6 am weekdays.
