= France 3 =

French TV channel launched in 1972

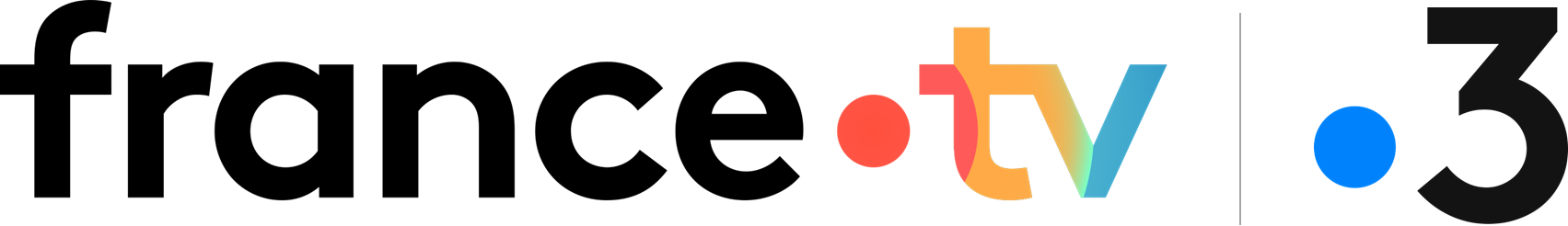
- Logo used since 6 June 2025
- Country: France
- Broadcast area: France, Andorra, and Monaco, reaching bordering regions via overspill of the French terrestrial network

Programming
- Language: French
- Picture format: 1080i HDTV (downscaled to 576i for the SDTV feed)

Ownership
- Owner: France Télévisions
- Sister channels: France 2; France 4; France 5; France Info

History
- Launched: 31 December 1972; 53 years ago
- Former names: Troisième Chaîne Couleur de l'ORTF (1972–1975); FR3 (1975–1992)

Links
- Website: www.france.tv/france-3

Availability

Terrestrial
- TNT: Channel 3
- TNT in Overseas France: Channels 3, 4, or 5

Streaming media
- FilmOn: Watch live

France 3 (French: [fʁɑ̃s tʁwɑ]) is a French free-to-air public television network. The second flagship network of France Télévisions, it broadcasts a wide range of general and specialized programming.

France 3 is structured as a regional service with 13 regions, each of which carrying programmes of regional interest alongside the national schedule. These include local news and current affairs programmes, programmes highlighting the region, and in some areas, programmes presented in regional languages. Since the 2020s, France 3 has also collaborated with Radio France's regional service Ici, with France 3's news bulletins falling under the Ici title, and the two services simulcasting the breakfast programme Ici Matin.

The network first launched by the Office de Radiodiffusion Télévision Française (ORTF) on 31 December 1972 as the Troisième Chaîne Couleur. In January 1975, as part of the separation of the ORTF, the network became the independently operated France Régions 3 (FR3). In September 1992, FR3 merged with Antenne 2 to form France Télévision, with the channel rebranding as France 3 as a result. In 2000, France Télévision was merged with the remaining public channels to form the present-day France Télévisions.

In 2018, France 3 was the third most watched television network in France.

== History ==
=== La Troisième Chaîne Couleur (1972–1974) ===
On 22 March 1969, the government mentioned a plan to create a third national television channel. Jean-Louis Guillaud, attached to the Office of the President of the Republic, coordinated the preparatory studies for its launch from November 1969. This new national channel of the French Television Broadcasting Office (ORTF) was to be launched directly in color and to allow better exposure of the regional offices of the ORTF through many opt-outs and through the decentralized production of the channel's programmes. The ORTF implemented this project throughout 1972 in the form of a national and interregional channel in color, without advertising or continuity announcers (although out-of-vision announcers were later introduced), offering shorter evenings at different times compared to the other two channels, with a majority of cultural programs, and relying largely on the technical and editorial relays of its regional stations. To accomplish this, the Board is setting up several heavy production centers within its main regional stations to produce programming for the new channel. The most important are those of Télé Marseille-Provence, Télé-Lille and Télé-Lyon. The third channel thus responds to the main concern of reform law no. 72-5534 3 July 1972, on the status of the ORTF, which aims to introduce the decentralization of production and the devolution of decisions on programs the Office.

The third color channel (La Troisième Chaîne Couleur) of the ORTF started its operations on 31 December 1972, at 7 pm with its start-up theme, which was followed by the CEO of the ORTF, Arthur Conte, and the general manager of the channel, Jean-Louis Guillaud, who present their wishes to the French for this new channel and for the year to come, calling on the ORTF's regional television services and aspiring young staff to join the new network, and then followed by Jean Amadou welcoming the viewers to briefly explain to them what will distinguish this new channel from the two others, in particular in its colorful, dynamic design and the introduction of genre credits before each programme, to replace the announcers, and which are all the work of stylist Catherine Chaillet. Then, the first program, Jeunes années, a program for young people, was launched with the cartoon Roulotte, followed at 8:35 p.m. by the inaugural evening of the channel consisting of a variety show written by Maurice Horgues, Jean Amadou and Robert Rocca, directed by Dirk Sanders and produced by the Lille8 production center and whose national sponsor is the singer Anne-Marie David, chosen by the CEO of the Office.

The director general of the third color channel, Jean-Louis Guillaud, decides to make extensive use of the regional stations of the ORTF and young directors for the production of the programs, because the third channel intends to prove itself as a new channel regions and cinema, using state-of-the-art techniques and high-quality graphics. The original project, which planned to rely on the cultural and artistic actors of the regions within the framework of the long-awaited decentralization within the Office, in fact comes down to a simple deconcentration of resources of production, regional television remaining confined to the little space granted in the opt-outs of the national service.

For the first time, the candidates of the second round of the presidential election of 1974, Valéry Giscard d'Estaing and François Mitterrand, agree to confront each other verbally in a televised debate, arbitrated by Jacqueline Baudrier and Alain Duhamel and broadcast on 10 May 1974, simultaneously on the three ORTF television channels.

Audiovisual reform law no. 74-696 of 7 August 1974 abolished the ORTF and created seven independent bodies, including three national television program companies. It came into effect on 1 January 1975, and the third ORTF channel closed its antenna on 5 January 1975, at 9:40 p.m. to make way the next day for the new national program company France Regions 3 (FR3).

For lack of a complete network on this date of 5 January 1975, a good part of France have known the programs of the ORTF's third channel. Throughout its run, broadcasts were restricted to three hours each evening and only reached a potential audience of 26% of the population – its transmissions primarily covered Paris, the Ile-de-France and Northern regions.

=== Autonomous from the state (1974–1999) ===
In 1974, the new President of the Republic Valéry Giscard d'Estaing asked his Prime Minister to present a communication on the French Television Broadcasting Office to the Council of Ministers on 3 July. Jacques Chirac then assures that "the new organization must be based on competition between autonomous units, fully responsible. It must ensure free and open information, must exclude any waste by relying on streamlined structures. The reports of the State and of the new autonomous units should be limited to the designation of its leaders". Law No. 74-696 7 August 1974, abolished the ORTF and created seven independent bodies, including three national television program companies, a national sound broadcasting company, two public industrial and commercial companies responsible for the production and broadcasting and a national audiovisual institute. The state monopoly is maintained and each of the companies is placed under the supervision of the Prime Minister. The Office's television director, Claude Contamine, was appointed by the Council of Ministers as president of the future national television program company to succeed the ORTF's third channel. The choice of a manager from the seraglio responds to the already well-defined face of the future third channel in the law of 7 August, article 10 of which specifies that "one of the national companies reserves a privileged place for the programming of films on television". This point is also clearly written into the specifications of the national program company France Régions 3, which makes it not only the channel aimed at the regions, but above all the channel of cinema and fiction in the broad sense, FR3 in front should devote more than half of its evenings to the airing of films and TV films. This new national television program company is also responsible for managing and developing the regional radio and television centers created by the Office (22 regional stations and 29 radio centers governed by 11 metropolitan directorates and a DOM-TOM directorate managing 9 stations in French overseas territories). We then count on the productions of the 22 regional stations, then equivalent to 35 minutes of regional television per day.

Law no. 74-696 7 August 1974, came into force on 1 January 1975, with the official birth of the three national television program companies Télévision française 1 (TF1), Antenne 2 (A2) and France Régions 3 (FR3), the national sound broadcasting company Radio France, the French Production Company (SFP), Télédiffusion de France (TDF) and the National Audiovisual Institute (INA).

On Monday 6 January 1975, at 6:55 pm, France Régions 3 begins its operations with a program schedule similar in all respects to that of the former third channel. The channel broadcasts only four hours of programs a day and devotes only five minutes to its inaugural broadcast this evening of 6 January to make way for the film Peau d'âne by Jacques Demy.

TDF activates the FR3 transmitters at 2 pm, a paradox because the channel then broadcasts both the target and its own programs. Until the arrival of a 24-hour broadcast, TDF will broadcast FIP as background music from 1975 to 2000 on network 3, then France Info until 2002.

FR3 programs are mainly devoted to cinema, debates and regional stalls. The cinema channel, FR3 participates as a co-producer and for a sum of 5,450,000 francs in the development of the seventh art. Following complaints from movie theater owners, who are concerned about unfair competition, Claude Contamine negotiates with the Film Industry Liaison Office (BLIC) to remove the movies from Friday, Saturday and Sunday evenings, as well as twelve film showings on Wednesday evenings while in return creating a film club slot on Sunday evenings in the second half of the evening. The agreement was finalized on 16 January 1976, and Cinéma de minuit was on the air two months later.

On 1 September 1975, an agreement was signed between the two national program companies FR3 and TF1 to allow the latter, which inherited the first black and white VHF network in 819 lines, to be able to broadcast its programs in color. FR3 agrees to make available the color broadcasting network to TF1 reserved for it for regular transmissions in the afternoon until the start of its own programs at 6 pm. In return, the agreement provides for TF1 to employ the regional production centers for FR33. The overseas station FR3-Comores became FR3 Mayotte on 14 December 1975, following the declaration of independence of the Federal Islamic Republic of the Comoros. With the gradual appearance of more specifically regional television content in 1976, the State very slowly undertook the administrative and economic regionalization of French territory, where regional stations gradually entered into this new framework.

FR3 must separate from its overseas broadcasting station of the French Territory of the Afars and Issas on 27 June 1977, following the declaration of independence of the Republic of Djibouti, although its still appeared highlighted in the channel's start-up sequence.

On the programming front, the network's first national news programme was introduced in 1978 in the form of Soir 3, a late night national and international bulletin. 21 October 1981, saw FR3 begin regular live coverage of ministers' questions in the National Assembly. Advertising was introduced to the network in January 1983. By September 1983, the twelve broadcasting centres around the country were airing an average of 3 hours per day of regional output. Popular programming on Saturday night included the first airings of the American soap opera Dynasty and a Disney Channel strand. National and regional news at peak time was integrated into a new nightly programme, 19|20, launched on 6 May 1986.

On 5 May 1981, the debate between Valéry Giscard d'Estaing and François Mitterrand for the second round of the presidential election, arbitrated by Jean Boissonnat and Michèle Cotta was broadcast simultaneously on TF1, Antenne 2 and FR3.

Although it had long denounced the grip of power on television, the left, which came to power on 10 May 1981, in turn used this habit of interventionism to appoint new presidents to head the national television program companies more won over to his ideas and who are themselves responsible for cleaning up their channel of broadcasts, journalists and presenters suspected of acquaintances with the former majority. Thus, journalist Guy Thomas was appointed president of FR3 on 24 June 1981. He appointed Serge Moati to program management with the idea of strengthening the cultural and regional character of the channel.

Law no. 82-652 29 July 1982, on audiovisual communication suppresses the State monopoly and recreates by decree no. 82-790 of 17 September 19824 the national color television company France Regions 3 which is now the High Authority for Audiovisual Communication, which draws up the specifications, monitors competition rules and appoints the channel's president. Guy Thomas is not confirmed in his post by the new supervisory authority which appoints André Holleaux in his place. Alongside the administrative decentralization law, the 1982 law provides for a large decentralization of radio and television. To do this, FR3 ceases to be the operator of the 29 regional radio centers which are transferred to Radio-France and also loses its overseas audiovisual activities in FR3 DOM-TOM to the benefit of the new national program company RFO which had to be created for this purpose.

Similarly, the text of the law provides for the creation of twelve regional television companies, with the same programming and management powers as the national company, with their own board of directors whose president would be appointed by the High Authority. The law also provides for an increase in the share of regional programs on the air, which must go from thirty-five minutes to one hour per day5, which requires an increase in the FR3 budget of approximately 220 million francs which, according to the direction of the chain, could be covered by the opening of the antenna to the publicity of mark whose income is estimated at 250 million francs. On 1 January 1983, the High Authority for Audiovisual Communication authorized brand advertising on the national FR3 network up to 250 million francs per year (i.e. 10% of the combined revenue of TF1 and Antenne 2), although the plan of decentralization in 1982 is slowed down by the authorities, in particular because of the poor results for the majority in the municipal elections of 1983. staff of the three public channels, which the license fee alone is no longer sufficient to finance. Regionalization is at the heart of the specifications set by the High Authority for the channel in 1984. It thus limits the number of film broadcasts per year to 170, identical to TF1 and Antenne 2, which means that FR3 its specificity as a cinema channel in favor of the future new private channel Canal+, leaving it only its regional specificity, and authorizes brand advertising on the regional antennas of FR3.

=== Plans to privatisation (1986–1989) ===
On 6 May 1986, FR3 changed its look and changed its program schedule by starting at 9 am, instead of 5 pm as it was until then, and by putting on the air a new local information program, with national and international headlines, named 19/20 created and presented by Henri Sannier with Ghislaine Ottenheimer. The in-vision announcers also made their appearance the same year.

In 1986, the then government of Jacques Chirac put forward the proposal of privatising one of the three public television companies. The original suggestion was to transform FR3 into a private body, however the final decision was that of TF1. The broadcasting authority at the time, the CNCL, appointed Rene Han to become programme controller of FR3, with the result that the networked programmes took an even more highbrow and cultural focus.

Changes to the schedule included a supplementary Friday night edition of Thalassa- le magazine de la mer whilst an opera was televised every Wednesday night. Popular quiz show Questions pour un champion made its broadcasting début in November 1988. La Classe, an entertainment programme which replaced Les Jeux de 20 heures and followed 19|20, was also introduced. Having launched without using speakerines, the network introduced in-vision announcers in September 1987 and retained live continuity until 1993, a year after TF1 and France 2 had abandoned in-vision presentation.

=== Reaffirmation of the public sector (1989–1990) ===
At the turn of the decade, the French television landscape which had been previously dominated by the three public stations now consisted of a strong private sector in the form of TF1 and Canal+ and the now-fragmented public sector of Antenne 2 and FR3. In 1990, the State, through the Conseil Supérieure de l'Audiovisuel (CSA), decided to merge the separate public entities into a new corporation.

At the same time, FR3 was already closing down on Saturday afternoons to allow nine hours of airtime to the educational station La Sept, airing from 3 pm to midnight. The arrangement continued until 1992 when the launch of the Franco-German network Arte led to the broadcaster's demise. On FR3 itself, the network aired current affairs programming on Saturday mornings including Continentales and L'Eurojournal, both presented by Alex Taylor.

=== The public reunification (1990–2009) ===
On 7 September 1992, FR3 and Antenne 2 were reunified in the new France Télévisions entity and rebranded as France 3 and France 2 respectively. Their logos match to the French flag like TF1. In 1998, France 3 partnered with TPS to launch a satellite station called Régions.

Between 2000 and 2005, La Cinquième (now France 5), RFO (along with RFOsat, then France Ô) and France 4 joined France 2 and France 3 under the France Télévisions corporate identity.

Under the direction of France Télévisions chairman Patrick de Carolis and director of channels Patrice Duhamel, October 2006 saw the introduction of a new daily cultural programme called Ce soir (ou jamais!) presented by Frederic Taddei, marking a new, more cultural focus to the network's programming. The late night news programme Soir 3 was given a new, fixed timeslot of 11 pm.

=== 2009–present ===
On 5 January 2009, all on-air advertising on France Télévisions, (including France 3) between 20:00 and 06:00 was eliminated, meaning the traditional start of primetime viewing in France of 20:45 was brought forward by ten minutes to 20:35.

With the establishment of TNT, France's digital terrestrial television network, France 3 has seen its national audience share down to under 10%, behind M6.

In October 2023, France Télévisions and Radio France announced that they would unify their regional services under the brand "Ici", encompassing the France Bleu radio network and France 3. This transition began with the two networks adopting a shared digital platform under the Ici branding, and the rebranding of France 3 news bulletins under the Ici title (including the new morning show Ici Matin, which is simulcast with France Bleu). The Ici branding began to be promoted on-air in late-August 2024; news programmes simulcast with France Bleu will begin to carry the Ici logo beginning in November, and France 3 will be fully rebranded as Ici in January 2025. The rebranding has faced criticism over the planned discontinuation of the historic France 3 brand, including protests by a union representing France Télévisions' employees.

== Branding ==
=== Idents ===
==== 1992–2002 ====
On 7 September 1992, the new France 3 channel was given a logo designed by the Gédéon agency: the number "3" in blue with the word "France" inscribed in the upper part of the number. The jingles and trailers divide the screen into three equal horizontal bands, the upper two of which display the natural landscapes of France. This dressing remained on the air for eight years, the landscapes evolving over the seasons and the years. Only the trailers changed in 1998 to show animals and plants in extreme close-up. On 2 October 2000, the dressing develops smoothly: the three horizontal bands are no longer the same size (the one in the middle is smaller) and the landscapes are no longer only natural, but also urban.

==== 2002–2018 ====
On 7 January 2002, the France Télévisions group adopted a new visual identity designated by the Gédéon agency. France 3 has a new logo similar to the other channels: a blue trapezium with the number "3" written in white inside along the right side. However, the logo has a particularity: the number "3" is not written with the new font of the group but keeps that of the old logo. On 8 September 2003, the channel changed its look. The commercial jingles feature animals drawn in white pencil coming to life in natural landscapes with ambient music. These evolve with the seasons and on 20 March 2006, the animals were replaced by plants.

On 7 April 2008, the logo of France 3 changed with the addition of a 3D effect. While the 3D logo appears on air, the old 2D formula is still used for the channel's print publications. On 5 January 2009, France 3 got a new look designed by the Dream On agency. The advertising idents and jingles depict characters carrying out actions of daily life. To create a visual difference, they are placed in contemplative natural landscapes. On 5 September 2011, France 3 adopted a new look from the Gédéon agency. The screen is divided into 24 boxes representing the 24 regional newsrooms of the channel. Each box contains a different video extract, which juxtaposed form a single image representing a person in an action of daily life. This design is inspired by Dadaism and the work of photographer David Hockney.

France 3 regularly set up temporary covers for events or special periods. Each summer, the channel offered a specific look. In summer 2013, the jingles featured wild animals with human behavior animated in 3D in photo-realistic settings. In 2014 and then 2015, new animals were featured. These idents had a certain public success (in particular the famous marmots, regularly acclaimed) and have been rewarded several times by professionals in the sector. From 31 December 2012, to 13 January 2013, and from 29 June – 11 August 2013, France 3 broadcast jingles designed by the Demoiselles agency to mark its 40th anniversary. A logo was also created based on the old logo of France Régions 3. On 4 January 2016, France 3 put its logo back in 2D. The 3D logo is still a small used.

==== 2018–present ====
On 8 December 2017, France Télévisions unveiled the new logos of its channels, which have been on the air since 29 January 2018.

On 29 January 2018, during a replay of the game (Le Grand Slam), a trailer and the new logo appeared at the end. This new logo is born during a coming next for the Ludo program block. Jingles pubs (Winter version) will appear from regional and local broadcasts such as 9:50 in the morning and Ludo, meanwhile, has new credits, a new look, and a new logo.

=== Logos ===
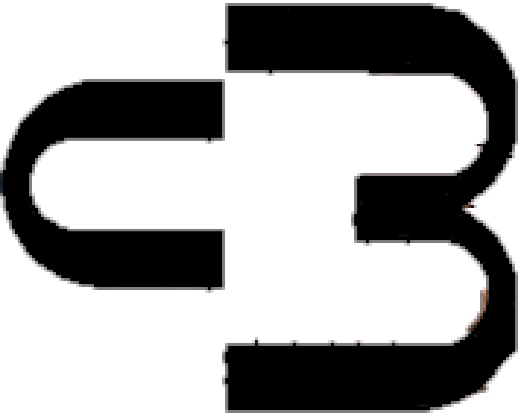
The logo of La Troisième Chaîne Couleur from 31 December 1972 until 5 January 1975

Logo of FR3 from 6 January 1975 till 6 April 1986

Logo of France 3 from 7 September 1992 till 6 January 2002

Logo of France 3 from 7 January 2002 till 7 April 2008

Logo of France 3 from 7 April 2008 till 29 January 2018

Logo of France 3 HD, 2010-2018

Logo of France 3 from 29 January 2018

On-screen logo of France 3 from 29 January 2018

== Mission ==
France 3 is a general entertainment channel whose mission is to deliver domestic and regional programming, offering cultural and educational advantages. Its local and regional vocation has been assured by its new mission statement. (" Elle doit privileger l'information décentralisée et les événements régionaux ") Translated it reads:

'It must promote local news and regional events and to introduce and familiarise the different regions of France and Europe and "to give space to our lively spectacles".'

== Headquarters ==
France 3 was originally based at 13–15 rue Cognacq-Jay in Paris, which housed the television services of the former Office de Radiodiffusion Télévision Française (ORTF).

Since TF1 became independent from the ORTF, FR3 was based at the Maison de la Radio in the 16th arrondissement of Paris with its editorial base located at 28 Cours Albert 1er in the 8th arrondissement.

In 1998, France 3 moved to a new base at 7 Esplanade Henri de France in the 15th arrondissement. This also houses the rest of France Télévisions' operations. The headquarters are accessible by taking RER Line C to Boulevard Victor.

== Programming ==
France 3 has fewer audience constraints compared to sister channel France 2, with the latter being the flagship public channel. This allows France 3 to concentrate on specialist and cultural programming.

It offered three information sessions per day until 25 August 2019, and offers since 26 August 2019, and the stop of Soir 3 (replaced by the 11 p.m. of France Info) two information sessions per day, which include regional and local news editions. It also offers several weather reports per day.

Every morning, France 3 airs the children's programming block Okoo. While France 5 broadcasts pre-school programmes, France 3 targets the older age range. Okoo airs all day long on France 4.

On 2 September 2020, France Ô ceased to be broadcast, since 31 August 2020, to replace certain missions of the channel, France 3 broadcasts two programs on the overseas territories every morning (outremer.lemag, outremer.l'info).

=== Newscasts (Journal télévisé) ===
There are three weekday newscasts broadcast as part of the channel's schedule:

==== Current ====
===== Ici 12/13 =====
Ici 12/13 is broadcast every day between 12:00 and 12:50 CET.

A typical edition of Ici 12/13 consists of regional, national and international news headlines at 12:00 followed by an Outre-Mer bulletin from the studios of RFO Paris at 12:15. The regional opt-out bulletins (midi-pile) air at noon, followed by the all edition regional news from 12:25–12:50 CET.

===== Ici 19/20 =====
Ici 19/20 France 3's flagship evening news programming block, Ici 19/20, airs nightly between 19:00 and 19:55 CET.

A typical edition of Ici 19/20 opens with a short summary of the national, regional and international headlines. This is then followed by an opt-out for either regional news or local features, with the main regional news airing after this at 19:00.

Previously, a 15-minute programme, launched in July 2010 called 18:30 Aujourd'hui opened the 19/20 news sequence, presenting the leading news stories from France 3's regional news bureaux. It was cancelled in September 2011, with the regional round-up moving to the 12/13 news programme.

==== Former ====
===== Soir/3 =====
Soir 3, broadcast every night at 22:30 CET, is the network's late night news programme, presented by Francis Letellier (ad interim) on weeknights and Sandrine Aramon at weekends.

On 5 January 2009, the programme began to incorporate a 5-minute regional news opt-out as part of a revamp of France 3's schedule to accommodate the end of prime-time advertising.

On 26 August 2019, the program was moved to Franceinfo due to cost cutting and was renamed to Le 23h. The concept of the program remains "grand JT du soir de France Télévisions".

=== Entertainment ===
One of France 3's most well-known programmes is Plus belle la vie, a recurring soap opera based in the fictional neighbourhood of Mistral, Marseille. The show has garnered critical acclaim within France and commands one of the highest viewing figures for the channel.

Game shows make up an important part of the channel's daytime schedule, currently including Duels en familles, Slam, and long-running quiz show Questions pour un Champion. Des chiffres et des lettres—France's longest-running game show—was also a fixture of its daytime lineup after moving from France 3 in 2004; the series concluded in 2024 after 52 years.

Other well-known programmes are personality talk show Vie privée, vie publique, (Private life, public life), Thalassa, a programme about all things concerning the sea, magazine show Des racines et des ailes and children's science show C'est pas sorcier. Cookery and home-improvement shows also feature, with Côté Cuisine, Côté Jardin and À Table!. Live music shows also feature weekly. Taratata focuses on rock music, whilst Chabada rediscovers forgotten French pop songs. A selection of these programmes are also broadcast internationally, via TV5Monde.

Another children's program is Les Minikeums, the first long-running program that introduced the marionettes. Until 1 April 2002, T O 3, one of the first children's programs produced entirely in computer-generated images, and the show presented by Theo and Luna, two virtual characters. Then after 30 August 2004, France Truc, the show presented by the three robotic animated mascots, Truc, Truque, and Truk, and Toowam, and later Ludo, the second and third long-running programs, which there are only some voice announcers.

=== Acquired programming ===
Amongst the acquired programmes screened by France 3, British dramas feature prominently. The popular detective dramas A Touch of Frost, Lewis, Inspector George Gently, and Midsomer Murders are shown and have different title names, such as Inspecteur Frost, Inspecteur Lewis, and Inspecteur Barnaby.

=== Information regarding climate change in weather forecasts ===
In February 2023, 2 state TV channels, France 2 and France 3 have begun to enter information regarding climate change in their weather forecasts. This will make the forecasts 1.5–2 minutes longer. The climate related information will rely on experts. The channels will also provide information about climate change and the ways stopping it to their workers. In France, except in case of breaking news they will ask reporters to take the train instead of a plane.

== Regional structure ==
From its historical origins, the Third Channel has used regional editorial and production centres which were developed since 1963 and owned by the ORTF.

From 1992 to 2010, France 3 had 13 regional directorates: France 3 Alsace, France 3 Aquitaine, France 3 Bourgogne Franche-Comté, France 3 Corse, France 3 Limousin Poitou-Charentes, France 3 Lorraine Champagne-Ardenne, France 3 Méditerranée, France 3 Nord-Pas-de-Calais Picardie, France 3 Normandie, France 3 Ouest, France 3 Paris Île-de-France Centre, France 3 Rhône-Alpes Auvergne, and France 3 Sud. They were associated with 12 so-called "outlying" centers and were supported by several local newsrooms producing television news.

The regional centres are often grouped in two levels – two half-hour news programmes and a short late night bulletin are produced and broadcast each day (in many cases, separate bulletins are produced for various parts of the region). The centres also produce shorter, more localised news bulletins for broadcast within 19|20. For example, France 3 Nord Pas-de-Calais Picardie produces localised bulletins for Côte d'Opale, Lille Métropole and Picardy. Various sport, features, current affairs and entertainment programming produced for and about the regions are also broadcast.

13 regional stations make up the network. Between them, the stations provide 24 sub-regional services, whose broadcast areas approximately match the 22 former metropolitan régions of France (the exceptions being that Provence-Alpes-Côte d'Azur and Rhône-Alpes are sub-divided into two). Each sub-regional news service emanates from a distinct centre of production. In addition, the stations provide 42 more localised news opt-outs.

Since 4 January 2010, a new organization of the regional network of France 3 has been implemented as part of the reform of the France Télévisions group into a single company. The network has 24 local branches responsible for producing regional and local programs, particularly news. They are united under four governance hubs that manage finance, human resources, and logistics: France 3 Nord-Est (based in Strasbourg), France 3 Nord-Ouest (based in Rennes); France 3 Sud-Ouest (based in Bordeaux) and France 3 Sud (based in Marseille). Corsica has its territorial management in Ajaccio.

In 2013, regional opt-outs accounted for 9.6% of the France 3 airtime or 3 hours per day. They're present in the 12/13 and 19/20 television news, as well as in several time slots of the program schedule: two hours in the morning on weekdays, half an hour on Saturday morning, and one hour in the afternoon, half an hour on Sunday afternoons, and once a month on Fridays in the second half of the evening.

The channel reorganized on 1 January 2017, to adapt to the territorial reform: "We want to double the regional offer of France 3, by 2020", announced at the end of 2016 Yannick Letranchant, Deputy Director.

On 27 September 2017, the regional and local editions of France 3 went on strike.

From 5 February 2018, one week after the new identity of France Télévisions, the news journals will have new opening credits, new decor, and new opt-outs and hang-ups for the regions and locals of France 3.

Exceptionally, from mid-March to mid-May 2020, all the regional journals were pooled into 11 specific entities to respond to the pooling of regions and reduction of staff in trays due to national confinement: Auvergne-Rhône-Alpes (Alpes, Auvergne, and Rhône-Alpes), Bourgogne-Franche-Comté (Bourgogne and Franche-Comté), Corsica, Grand-Est (Alsace, Champagne-Ardennes, and Lorraine), Hauts-de-France (Nord Pas-de-Calais and Picardie), Ile-de-France, Normandie (combining Caen and Rouen sector, two Normandy editions formerly Basse and Haute Normandy respectively), Nouvelle-Aquitaine (Aquitaine, Limousin, and Poitou-Charentes), Occitanie (Languedoc-Roussillon and Midi-Pyrénées), Provence-Alpes Côte d'Azur (Provence-Alpes and Côte d'Azur), and a special entity that does not usually exist called Grand-Ouest (grouping only during periods of pooling the Bretagne editions, Centre-Val-de-Loire and Pays de la Loire). This pooling resumed for 4 weeks from Saturday, 3 April 2021, at noon, thus temporarily eliminating all the usual local editions, as well as the local editions created in 2020 and 2021 (respectively at 11:53 a.m., 6:53 p.m. for local editions on weekdays and 6:30 p.m. on weekdays). Shared information also resumes from Saturday, 8 January 2022, until Sunday, 30 January 2022.

No.	Region name	Area served	News regions	Centres of production
1.	France 3 Alsace	Grand Est	1	Strasbourg
2.	France 3 Aquitaine	Nouvelle-Aquitaine	1	Bordeaux
3.	France 3 Bourgogne Franche-Comté	Bourgogne-Franche-Comté	2	Dijon, Besançon
4.	France 3 Corse	Corsica	1	Ajaccio
5.	France 3 Lorraine Champagne-Ardenne	Grand Est	2	Nancy, Reims
6.	France 3 Méditerranée	Provence-Alpes-Côte d'Azur	2	Marseille, Antibes
7.	France 3 Nord Pas-de-Calais Picardie	Hauts-de-France	2	Lille, Amiens
8.	France 3 Normandie	Normandy	2	Caen, Rouen
9.	France 3 Ouest	Brittany, Pays de la Loire	2	Rennes, Nantes
10.	France 3 Paris Île-de-France	Île-de-France (including Paris), Centre-Val de Loire	2	Vanves, Orléans
11.	France 3 Limousin	Nouvelle-Aquitaine	1	Limoges
11.	France 3 Poitou-Charentes	Nouvelle-Aquitaine	1	Poitiers
12.	France 3 Auvergne-Rhône-Alpes	Auvergne-Rhône-Alpes	3	Lyon, Grenoble, Clermont-Ferrand
13.	France 3 Sud	Occitanie	2	Toulouse, Montpellier

=== Ici 19/20 local opt-outs ===
Within the main Ici 19/20 programming block and depending on where the viewer receives France 3 via terrestrial transmitters, local opt-out bulletins (some live, some pre-recorded) concentrating on specific communautés are aired. The ten-minute opt-outs air at around 1845 CET before the main regional news.

France 3 région	Sub-region	Number of opt-outs	Bulletins	News bureaux
Alsace		2^{1}	Strasbourg Deux-Rives, Haute-Alsace	Strasbourg, Mulhouse
Aquitaine		4	Pays Basque, Pau Sud-Aquitaine, Périgords, Bordeaux Métropole	Bayonne, Pau, Périgueux, Bordeaux
Bourgogne Franche-Comté	Burgundy	0^{2}		
Bourgogne Franche-Comté	Franche-Comté	0^{2}		
Corse		0^{3}		
Limousin Poitou-Charentes	Limousin	2	Limoges, Pays de Corrèze	Limoges, Brive-la-Gaillarde
Limousin Poitou-Charentes	Poitou-Charentes	1	Atlantique	La Rochelle
Lorraine Champagne-Ardenne	Lorraine	2	Metz, Nancy	Metz, Nancy
Lorraine Champagne-Ardenne	Champagne-Ardenne	1	Champagne Info	Reims
Méditerranée	Provence-Alpes	2	Marseille, Var	Marseille, Toulon
Méditerranée	Côte d'Azur	1	Nice	Nice
Nord Pas-de-Calais Picardie	Nord Pas-de-Calais	2	Côte d'Opale, Lille Métropole	Boulogne-sur-Mer, Lille
Nord Pas-de-Calais Picardie	Picardie	0^{4}		
Normandie	Upper Normandy	2	Baie-de-Seine, Rouen Métropole	Le Havre, Rouen
Normandie	Lower Normandy	2	7 jours en Cotentin (weekly), Caen Métropole	Cherbourg, Caen
Ouest	Pays de la Loire	2	Estuaire, Maine	Nantes, Le Mans
Ouest	Brittany	2^{5}	Upper Brittany, Iroise	Rennes, Brest
Paris Île-de-France Centre	Paris Île-de-France	0^{6}		
Paris Île-de-France Centre	Centre	3	Orléans Loiret, Touraine Val de Loire, Berry	Orléans, Tours, Déols
Rhône-Alpes Auvergne	Rhône-Alpes	2	Saint-Étienne, Grand Lyon	Saint-Étienne, Lyon
Rhône-Alpes Auvergne	Alpes	1	Grenoble	Grenoble
Rhône-Alpes Auvergne	Auvergne	1	Clermont Soir	Clermont-Ferrand
Sud	Midi-Pyrénées	3	Toulouse, Quercy-Rouergue, Tarn	Toulouse, Rodez, Albi
Sud	Languedoc-Roussillon	3^{7}	Montpellier, Pays Catalan, Pays Gardois	Montpellier, Perpignan, Nîmes

Notes

- ^1 France 3 Alsace also airs a daily bulletin in the Alsatian language (Rund um) as part of the Ici 12/13 lunchtime news block.
- ^2 France 3 Bourgogne Franche-Comté airs a daily pan-regional magazine show, Ça manque pas d'air, instead of local news bulletins.
- ^3 The Soir 3 regional opt-out on France 3 Corse is in the Corsican language.
- ^4 France 3 Picardie airs a daily pan-regional discussion show, Quoi de neuf depuis?, instead of local news bulletins.
- ^5 France 3 Bretagne also airs a daily bulletin in the Breton language (An taol lagad) in the Iroise area as part of the Ici 12/13 lunchtime news block.
- ^6 France 3 Paris Île-de-France airs additional pan-regional news coverage during this timeslot.
- ^7 France 3 Languedoc-Roussillon also airs bulletins in the Occitan language (Edicion Occitana) and Catalan language (Pais Catala) as part of Ici 19/20 on Saturdays.

=== Regional languages ===
France 3 also produces and airs programmes regionally for the various regional languages of France. Outside of regional news bulletins, France 3 also airs general interest programmes in the target language.

==== Occitan ====
Regional programming in the Occitan language started sporadically, with 15 minutes daily of news reports. After audience protests, by 1982 the time devoted to the language rose to over 3 hours weekly.

- Viure al Pais (Living in the Country) – Magazine show in Catalan or Occitan aired on France 3 Sud.
- Punt de vista (Point of View) – France 3 Aquitaine, France 3 Languedoc-Roussillon
- Vaqui – Magazine programme broadcast on France 3 Provence-Alpes

==== Breton ====
Programmes in the Breton language started with a daily news bulletin from predecessor RTF Télé-Bretagne.

- Red an Amzer – weekly current affairs programme, broadcast on Sundays
- Te ha Me (From You to Me) – Interview programme, broadcast on Saturday mornings
- Mouchig-Dall – Children's programme, broadcast on Wednesdays
- Son da zont (Song Coming Up) – Saturday morning music programme, showcasing music in Breton.
- Istorioù Breizh

==== Corsican ====
Despite having special status as a semi-autonomous region, only 40 minutes per week are devoted to the Corsican language. The first programme in Corsican was in 1966 and was a weekly poetry reading from a Corsican-language school.

- Soir 3 Édition Corse – nightly news opt-out.

==== Alsatian ====
Since the creation of its predecessor RTF Télé-Strasbourg, there have been sporadic programmes in the Alsatian language. By 1974, there was a weekly show of 45 minutes. In 1989, Rund Um, a magazine programme aired its first episode. After the merger of France 2 and France 3 into France Télévisions, France 3 Alsace financed an Alsatian version of animated series Tintin.

- A Gueter – cookery show, airs Saturday mornings.
- Lade ùff – Regional arts and culture show, shown Saturday mornings.
- Gsuntheim – airs Sunday mornings.

== Organization ==
=== Directors ===
Chairmen and chief executive officers:

- Jean-Louis Guillaud: 31 December 1972 – 31 December 1974
- Claude Contamine: 1 January 1975 – June 1981
- Guy Thomas: June 1981 – 09/1982
- André Holleaux: 09/1982 – 21 October 1985
- Janine Langlois-Glandier] 21 October 1985 – 12/1986
- René Han: 12/1986 – 10 August 1989
- Philippe Guilhaume (joint chairmanship A2/FR3): 10 August 1989 – 19 December 1990
- Hervé Bourges (joint chairmanship A2/FR3): 19 December 1990 – 7 September 1992

General managers:

- Philippe Levrier
- Rémy Pflimlin
- Geneviève Giard: since September 2005

== Presenters/hosts ==
- Jean-Michel Blier
- Marlène Blin
- Laurence Bobillier
- Lionel Cottu
- Nathalie Simon
- Florence Klein
- Jean-Marc Souami
- Gérald Dahan
- Frédéric Taddéї
- Marie Drucker
- Mireille Dumas
- Jean-Sébastien Fernandes
- Magali Forestier
- Marc-Olivier Fogiel
- Franz-Olivier Giesbert
- Yann Gonon
- Jamy Gourmaud
- Frédéric Courant
- Sabine Quindou
- Martin Igier
- Serge July
- Hélène Laurca
- Yves Lecoq
- Julien Lepers
- Francis Letellier
- Stéphane Lippert
- Élise Lucet
- Catherine Matausch
- Nagui
- Christine Ockrent
- Georges Pernoud
- Tania Young
- Patrick de Carolis
- Daniela Lumbroso
- Christophe Poullain
- Audrey Pulvar
- Florian Ringuédé
- Laurent Romejko
- Anne Sinclair
- Henri Sannier
- Mathieu Lartau
- Gérard Holtz
- Laurent Luyat

== Cinema ==
France 3 supports the co-production of feature films through its subsidiary France 3 Cinéma, which was established as FR3 Films Production in 1984. The creation of FR3 Films Production came after fellow television companies TF1, Antenne 2 (now France 2) and S.F.P. had each established, in 1981, their own subsidiaries specializing in film co-production: TF1 Films Production, Films A2 (now France 2 Cinéma) and Société française de Production cinématographique.

France 3 Cinéma was preceded by ORTF's involvement in the co-production of feature films, which began as early as 1970. ORTF's first investment was René Allio's film, Les Camisards (1972) and it produced approximately 40 other films, including Benoît Jacquot's The Musician Killer (1975), directed by Benoît Jacquot (1974), and Patrice Chéreau's La Chair de l'orchidée (1975). Following the breakup of ORTF, Antenne 2 and FR3 continued this policy. FR3 had been officially recognized as a film producer in 1975.
