= 7 d'Or =

French television awards

- Awarded for: Excellence in Television
- Country: France
- Presented by: Télé 7 Jours
- First award: 1985
- Website: http://www.tele7jours.com

The 7 d'Or or Sept d'Or (French for "Seven of Gold" or "Golden Seven") was a French television production award (similar in nature to the Emmy Awards), presented by Télé 7 Jours (a weekly French magazine with listings of TV shows). The awards were presented in the fall of each year from 1985 to 2003 (no awards were presented in 1992, 1998 and 2002) during a televised "Night of the 7 d'Or" awards ceremony (1988 and 2003 were not televised). The first ceremonies took place in Le Lido in Paris.

Since 2003, several attempts have been made to bring back the "7 d'Or" awards. In 2005, some sources announced a possible return of the awards, produced by Endemol; in 2008, a second return was mentioned on Direct 8, but this project didn't come to fruition; in late November 2011, the editor in chief of Télé 7 Jours announced that negotiations were taking place with France Télévisions to try to bring back the ceremonies in 2012.

== List of award winners ==
The following is a list of the 7 d'Or award winners:

Year	Award category (Best)	Person	Show	Channel	Public Vote
1985	Actor	Michel Bouquet	A Christmas Carol		
1985	Actress	Suzanne Flon	Mademoiselle Clarisse		
1985	Host	Bernard Pivot			
1985	Announcer	Évelyne Dhéliat			
1985	Sportscaster	Gérard Holtz		Antenne 2	
1985	Journalist	François de Closets			
1985	Newscaster	Christine Ockrent			
1985	Newsmagazine		7 sur 7		
1985	Youth Program		Le Disney Channel	FR3	
1985	Cultural Program		Apostrophes	Antenne 2	
1985	Documentary		L'Equipe Cousteau en Amazonie		
1985	TV movie	Claude Santelli	Jacques le fataliste et son maître		
1985	Game Show		La Chasse aux trésors		
1985	Musical Program		Musiques au Cœur		
1985	Variety Show		Les Enfants du rock		
1985	Commercial	Richard Raynat	Citroën		
1985	Television Series	Philippe Monnier	Des grives aux loups		
1985	Music	Maurice Jarre	Au nom de tous les miens		
1985	Screenwriting	Jean L'Hôte	Le Diable dans le bénitier	TF1	
1985	Director	Maurice Dugowson	Droit de réponse		
1985	Director (fiction)	Claude Santelli	Jacques le fataliste et son maître		
1985	Producer	Bernard Pivot	Apostrophes	France 2	
1985	Super 7 d'Or	Christine Ockrent			
1986	Actor	André Dussolier	Music-Hall	Canal+	
1986	Actress	Alice Sapritch	L'Affaire Marie Besnard	TF1	
1986	Host	Michel Polac		TF1	
1986	Announcer	Évelyne Leclercq		TF1	
1986	Newscaster	Claude Sérillon		Antenne 2	
1986	Sportscaster	Charles Biétry		Canal+	
1986	Journalist	Anne Sinclair		TF1	
1986	Youth Program		Récré A2	Antenne 2	
1986	Newsmagazine		Droit de réponse	TF1	
1986	Cultural Program		Cinéma, Cinémas	Antenne 2	
1986	Variety Show		Brel, un cri	FR3	
1986	Comedy Show		Cocoricocoboy	TF1	
1986	Documentary		Thalassa	FR3	
1986	Game Show		Mardi cinéma	France 2	
1986	Sports Program		Auto Moto	TF1	
1986	Commercial	Étienne Chatiliez	Eram		
1986	Television Special		Spécial cinéma by Frédéric Mitterrand	TF1	
1986	TV movie	Yves-André Hubert	L'Affaire Marie Besnard	TF1	
1986	Television Series	Yannick Andréi	L'Affaire Caillaux	Antenne 2	
1986	Set Design	Claude Lenoir			
1986	Sound	Serge Deraison			
1986	Music	Vladimir Cosma	Eté 36	Antenne 2	
1986	Cinematography	Claude Robin			
1986	Editing	Chantal Rémy			
1986	Screenwriting	Frédéric Pottecher	L'Affaire Marie Besnard	TF1	
1986	Director	Pierre Badel and Jean-René Vivet	Tour de France	Antenne 2	
1986	Director (fiction)	Hervé Baslé	Aux Champs and L'Ami Maupassant	TF1	
1986	Producer	Michel Boujut, Anne Andreu and Claude Ventura	Cinéma, Cinémas	Antenne 2	
1986	Super 7 d'Or	Patrick Sabatier		TF1	
1986	Honorary Award	Jacques Martin and Guy Lux			
1987	Actor	Pierre Arditi	Le Parfait Amour	TF1	
1987	Actress	Rosy Varte	Maguy	Antenne 2	
1987	Announcer	Gilette Aho		Antenne 2	
1987	Host (talk show)	Bernard Pivot		Antenne 2	
1987	Host (variety show)	Michel Drucker		Antenne 2	
1987	Sportscaster	Robert Chapatte	Tour de France	Antenne 2	
1987	Journalist	Philippe Alfonsi		FR3	
1987	Newscaster	Bernard Rapp		Antenne 2	
1987	Variety Show		Champs-Élysées	Antenne 2	
1987	Cultural Program		Apostrophes	Antenne 2	
1987	Comedy Show		Objectif Nul	Canal+	
1987	Newsmagazine		Taxi	FR3	
1987	Game Show		Des chiffres et des lettres	France 3	
1987	Youth Program		Mini Mag	TF1	
1987	Commercial	Georges Lautner	Perrier		
1987	Documentary		L'Aventure des plantes	TF1	
1987	Musical Program		Grand Echiquier	FR3	
1987	TV movie	Pierre Boutron	Les Etonnements d'un couple moderne	Antenne 2	
1987	Television Series	Michel Wyn	Félicien Grevèche	Antenne 2	
1987	Television Special		Hommage à Coluche by Guy Job	Antenne 2	
1987	Cinematography	André Néau			
1987	Sound	Michel Hubert-Delisle			
1987	Editing	Nicole Pellegrin			
1987	Set Design	Serge Sommier			
1987	Screenwriting	Jean-Claude Carrière	Les Etonnements d'un couple moderne	Antenne 2	
1987	Director	Maurice Dugowson	Droit de réponse	TF1	
1987	Director (fiction)	Marcel Bluwal	1996	TF1	
1987	Honorary Award	Robert Chapatte			
1988	Actor	Jacques Dufilho	Une femme innocente	TF1	
1988	Actress	Anny Duperey	Un château au soleil	Antenne 2	
1988	Announcer	Marie-Ange Nardi		Antenne 2	
1988	Host (variety show)	Antoine de Caunes		Antenne 2	
1988	Host (talk show)	Anne Sinclair		TF1	
1988	Sportscaster	Gérard Holtz	Samedi Passion	Antenne 2	
1988	Journalist	Bernard Rapp		Antenne 2	
1988	Newscaster	Bruno Masure		TF1	
1988	Youth Program		Il était une fois... la Vie	FR3	
1988	Variety Show		Le Bébête show	TF1	
1988	Game Show		Starquizz	Canal+	
1988	Cultural Program		Océanique	FR3	
1988	TV movie		La Croisade by Serge Moati	FR3	
1988	Television Special		Enfants mal aimés, la loi du silence by Jean-Marie Cavada and Norbert Baut	Antenne 2	
1988	Commercial	Chico Bialas	Schweppes		
1988	Documentary		L'Argent de la drogue	TF1	
1988	Television Series		Afghanistan, le pays interdit by Alain Corneau	TF1	
1988	Editing	Jean-Claude Fourche			
1988	Sound	Gérard Lion			
1988	Set Design	Claude Lenoir			
1988	Screenwriting	Robert Merle and Bernard Revon	L'Île	TF1	
1988	Cinematography	Charlie Gaeta			
1988	Director	Françoise Boulain	Champs-Élysées	Antenne 2	
1989	Actor	Michel Piccoli	La Ruelle au clair de lune	FR3	
1989	Actress	Annie Girardot	Le Vent des moissons	TF1	
1989	Host (variety show)	Caroline Tresca		FR3	
1989	Host (talk show)	Frédéric Mitterrand		Antenne 2	
1989	Sportscaster	Roger Zabel		TF1	
1989	Newscaster	Guillaume Durand		La Cinq	
1989	Commercial	Jean-Baptiste Mondino	Kodak		
1989	Television Special		L'Illettrisme en France by Pierre-André Boutang	FR3	
1989	Cultural Program		L'Assiette anglaise	Antenne 2	
1989	Variety Show		TVN 595	Canal+	
1989	Youth Program		Ça Cartoon	Canal+	
1989	Documentary		L'Equipe Cousteau, à la recherche du Monde	Antenne 2	
1989	TV movie		Jean de Florette by Claude Berri	Antenne 2	
1989	Television Series		Maria Vandamme by Jacques Ertaud	TF1	
1989	Screenwriting	Jacques Dusquene et Béatrice Rubinstein	Maria Vandamme	TF1	
1989	Music	Claude Bolling	La Garçonne	Antenne 2	
1989	Set Design	Serge Sommier			
1989	Sound	Joël Moulet			
1989	Editing	Nicole Dedieu			
1989	Cinematography	Claude Robin			
1989	Director	Jean-Louis Cap and Gilles Daude	Nulle part ailleurs	Canal+	
1989	Director (fiction)	Jacques Ertaud	Maria Vandamme	TF1	
1990	Actor	Roger Hanin	Navarro	TF1	
1990	Actress	Delphine Seyrig	Une Saison de feuilles	Antenne 2	
1990	Host (variety show)	Patrick Sébastien		TF1	
1990	Host (talk show)	Anne Sinclair		TF1	
1990	Sportscaster	Gérard Holtz		Antenne 2	
1990	Newscaster	Bruno Masure		TF1	
1990	Investigative Reporting		J'ai douze ans et je fais la guerre	Canal+/France 3	
1990	Variety Show		Carte blanche à Frédéric Mitterrand	Antenne 2	
1990	Youth Program		Babar	Canal+/FR3	
1990	Commercial	Mandy Fletcher	Eram		
1990	Television Special		La Télé des Inconnus	Antenne 2	
1990	Cultural Program		Thalassa	FR3	
1990	Documentary		De Nuremberg à Nuremberg	Antenne 2	
1990	TV movie		Le Prix du silence by Jacques Ertaud	Canal+/TF1	
1990	Newsmagazine		Envoyé spécial	Antenne 2	
1990	Television Series		Condorcet by Michel Soulter	TF1	
1990	Editing	Paul Zerbib			
1990	Sound	Michel Aringou			
1990	Music	Michel Portal	Ivan Ivanovitch and L'Ami Giono	Antenne 2	
1990	Set Design	Michel Millecamps			
1990	Screenwriting	Jacques Fansten	La Fracture du Myocarde	Canal+/Antenne 2	
1990	Cinematography	Michel Carré			
1990	Director	Maurice Dugowson	La Marche du siècle	FR3	
1990	Director (fiction)	Jacques Ertaud	Le Prix du silence	Canal+/TF1	
1991	Actor	Jean Carmet	Bouvard et Pécuchet	FR3/La Sept	
1991	Actress	Marie-Christine Barrault	Marie Curie, une femme honorable	France 3	
1991	Host (variety show)	Antoine de Caunes	Nulle part ailleurs	Canal+	
1991	Host (talk show)	Jean-Marie Cavada	La Marche du siècle	France 3	
1991	Sportscaster	Charles Biétry		Canal+	
1991	Newscaster	Claire Chazal		Antenne 2	
1991	Investigative Reporting		Thalassa: Aral : la mer assassinée	France 3	
1991	Commercial	Jean-Paul Goude	Perrier		
1991	Cultural Program		Cinéma, Cinémas	Antenne 2	
1991	TV movie		Bouvard et Pécuchet	FR3 / la Sept	
1991	Youth Program		Décode pas Bunny	Canal+	
1991	Sports Program		Tour de France	Antenne 2	
1991	Sports Broadcast		Tour de France	Antenne 2	
1991	Television Special		Opening Ceremony of the 1992 Winter Olympics	Antenne 2	
1991	Game Show		Questions pour un champion	France 3	
1991	Newsmagazine		La Marche du siècle	FR3	
1991	Variety Show		Stars 90	TF1	
1991	Documentary		Des trains pas comme les autres	Antenne 2	
1991	Television Series		Navarro	TF1	
1991	Screenwriting	Jean-Claude Carrière	Bouvard et Pécuchet	FR3/la Sept	
1991	Sound	Gérard Lion			
1991	Music	Vladimir Cosma			
1991	Editing	Robert Coursez			
1991	Set Design	François Courtin			
1991	Cinematography	Charlie Gaeta			
1991	Director	Régis Forissier	Tour de France	Antenne 2	
1991	Director (fiction)	Marcel Bluwal	Les Ritals	Canal+/TF1	
1993	Actor	Jean-Pierre Marielle	La Controverse de Valladolid	France 3/la Sept	
1993	Actress	Anny Duperey	Une famille formidable	TF1	
1993	Host (game show)	Nagui	Que le meilleur gagne	France 2	
1993	Host (variety show)	Philippe Gildas	Nulle part ailleurs	Canal+	
1993	Variety Show		Les Guignols de l'info	Canal+	
1993	Investigative Reporting		Envoyé spécial: Le Front national	France 2	
1993	Sportscaster	Gérard Holtz	Stade 2	France 2	
1993	Newscaster	Bruno Masure		France 2	
1993	Sports Program		Olympic Games of Barcelona	Canal+	
1993	Youth Program		Les Aventures de Tintin (The Adventures of Tintin)	France 3	
1993	Newsmagazine		Envoyé spécial	France 2	
1993	Commercial	Jean-Paul Goude	Perrier		
1993	Documentary		Le Cercle de minuit	France 2	
1993	TV movie		La Controverse de Valladolid	France 3	
1993	Television Series		Nestor Burma	France 2	
1993	Screenwriting	Jean-Claude Carrière	La Controverse de Valladolid	France 3/la Sept	
1993	Editing	Anne-Marie Basurco			
1993	Set Design	Richard Cunin			
1993	Sound	Guy Savin			
1993	Cinematography	Charlie Gaeta			
1993	Director (fiction)	Jean-Daniel Verhaeghe	La Controverse de Valladolid	France 3/la Sept	
1994	Actor	Gérard Klein	L'Instit	France 2	
1994	Actress	Brigitte Fossey	Le Château des Oliviers	France 2	
1994	Host (talk show)	Jean-Marie Cavada	La Marche du siècle	France 3	
1994	Host (game show)	Nagui	Que le meilleur gagne	France 2	
1994	Sportscaster	Patrick Chêne	Stade 2	France 2	
1994	Newscaster	Paul Amar		France 2	
1994	Investigative Reporting		Envoyé spécial	France 2	
1994	Newsmagazine		La Marche du siècle	France 3	
1994	Documentary		Édith Piaf	Arte	
1994	Youth Program		Ça Cartoon	Canal+	
1994	Variety Show		Nulle part ailleurs	Canal+	
1994	Sports Program		L'Équipe du dimanche	Canal+	
1994	Musical Program		Culture rock	M6	
1994	TV movie		L'Affaire Seznec	TF1	
1994	Television Series		Le Château des Oliviers	France 2	
1994	Screenwriting	Yves Boisset	L'Affaire Seznec	TF1	
1994	Set Design	Stéfanie Jarre and Suzanne Lang Willard			
1994	Music	Ennio Morricone	Mort à Palerme	TF1	
1994	Sound	Patrice Kramer			
1994	Editing	Marie-Sophie Dubus			
1994	Cinematography	Jean-Philippe Bourdon	Taratata		
1994	Director (fiction)	Yves Boisset	L'Affaire Seznec	TF1	
1995	Actor	Jean Carmet	Eugénie Grandet	France 3	
1995	Actress	Danielle Darrieux	Jalna	France 2	
1995	Newcomer of the Year	Arthur		France 2	
1995	Host (variety show)	Antoine de Caunes	Nulle part ailleurs	Canal+	
1995	Host (talk show)	Jean-Marie Cavada	La Marche du siècle	France 3	
1995	Host (game show)	Nagui	Que le meilleur gagne	France 2	
1995	Sportscaster	Gérard Holtz		France 2	
1995	Newscaster	Bruno Masure		France 2	
1995	Musical Program		Taratata	France 2	
1995	Sports Program		Stade 2	France 2	
1995	Youth Program		Ça Cartoon	Canal+	
1995	Game Show		Des chiffres et des lettres	France 2	
1995	Newsmagazine		Capital	M6	
1995	Cultural Program		Bouillon de culture	France 2	
1995	TV movie		Les Maîtres du pain by Hervé Baslé	France 2	
1995	Documentary		Les Brûlures de l'histoire	France 3	
1995	Television Series		Jalna	France 2	
1995	Screenwriting	Hervé Baslé, Jean-Pierre Gallo and Bernard Lantéric	Les Maîtres du pain	France 2	
1995	Set Design	Yves de Marseille			
1995	Editing	Anne-Marie Basurco and Claude Ronzeau			
1995	Sound	Barbier			
1995	Music	Michel Portal	Eugénie Grandet	France 3	
1995	Cinematography	Jean-Philippe Bourdon	Taratata		
1995	Director (fiction)	Hervé Baslé	Les Maîtres du pain	France 2	
1996	Actor (TV film)	Robin Renucci	Des enfants dans les arbres and Parents à mi-temps	TF1	
1996	Actress (TV film)	Corinne Touzet	Une femme d'honneur	TF1	
1996	Actor (series)	Gérard Klein	L'Instit	France 2	
1996	Actress (series)	Véronique Genest	Julie Lescaut	TF1	
1996	Host (variety show)	Pascal Brunner	Fa si la Chanter	France 3	
1996	Host (cultural program)	Sylvain Augier	Faut pas rêver	France 3	
1996	Host (social magazine)	Emmanuel Chain	Capital	M6	
1996	Host (youth program)	Gérard Klein	Va savoir	La 5ème	
1996	Host (game show)	Patrice Laffont, Marie-Ange Nardi and Laurent Broomhead	Pyramide	France 2	
1996	Host (newsmagazine)	Paul Nahon and Bernard Benyamin	Envoyé spécial	France 2	
1996	Sportscaster	Thierry Roland		TF1	
1996	Newscaster	Jean-Pierre Pernaut	13:00 news	TF1	
1996	Sports Program		La Légende du sport	Arte	
1996	Foreign TV Series		ER	France 2	
1996	Youth Program		Va savoir	La 5ème	
1996	Animated Program		Pierre et le loup (Peter and the Wolf)	Canal+	
1996	Variety Show		Nulle part ailleurs with Les Guignols de l'info	Canal+	
1996	Musical Program		Les Enfoirés 96 - Les Restos du cœur	TF1	
1996	Newsmagazine	Paul Nahon and Bernard Benyamin	Envoyé spécial	France 2	
1996	Social Magazine		Strip-tease	France 3	
1996	Cultural Program		La 25ème heure	France 2	
1996	Travel Program		Faut pas rêver	France 3	
1996	Documentary		Histoire secrète de la télévision by Maurice Dugowson	France 3	
1996	TV movie		L'Âge des possibles by Pascale Ferran		
1996	Television Series		L'Allée du roi by Nina Companeez	France 2	
1996	Screenwriting	Henri de Turenne and Michel Deutsch	Les Alsaciens ou les Deux Mathilde	Arte	
1996	Music	Michal Jonasz	Zone interdite	M6	
1996	Editing	Catherine Chouchant	Julie Lescaut	TF1	
1996	Set Design	Philippe Desert		Canal+	
1996	Sound	Patrice Kramer	Taratata	France 2	
1996	Cinematography	Dominique Brabant	L'Allée du roi	France 2	
1996	Director (fiction)	Pascale Ferran	L'Âge des possibles	Arte	
1997	Actor (series)	Roger Hanin	Navarro	TF1	
1997	Actor (TV film)	Richard Bohringer	Un homme en colère	TF1	
1997	Actress (series)	Mimie Mathy	Joséphine, ange gardien	TF1	
1997	Actress (TV film)	Véronique Jannot	C'est l'homme de ma vie	TF1	
1997	Newscaster	Bruno Masure	20:00 news	France 2	
1997	Sports Program		Tour de France by Patrick Chêne and Bernard Thévenet	France 2	
1997	Newsmagazine		52 sur la Une by Jean Bertolino	TF1	
1997	Youth Program		Les Minikeums	France 3	
1997	Variety Show		Les Enfants de la télé by "Arthur"	TF1	
1997	Musical Program		La Fureur by "Arthur"	TF1	
1997	Cultural Program	Martine-Allain-Régnault and François Closets	Savoir plus santé	France 2	
1997	Travel Program		Thalassa by Georges Pernoud	France 3	
1997	Documentary		Mémoires d'immigrés by Yamina Benguigui	Canal+	
1997	Game Show		Questions pour un champion	France 3	
1997	Social Magazine	Jean-Pierre Pernaut	Combien ça coûte ?	TF1	
1997	TV movie		Le Pantalon	France 2	
1997	Television Series		Entre Terre et mer	France 2	
1997	Screenwriting	Hervé Baslé	Entre terre et mer	France 2	
1997	Set Design	L. Brenguier	Les Filles du maître du chais	France 3	
1997	Music	Groupe Blondey	Inca de oro	Arte	
1997	Sound	R. Buttin	Turandot	France 3	
1997	Editing		Les Guignols de l'info	Canal+	
1997	Cinematography	Bernard Lutic	La Ville dont le prince est un enfant	Arte	
1997	Director (fiction)	Hervé Baslé	Entre terre et mer	France 2	
1997	Director	Jérôme Revon	Capital	M6	
1999	Celebrity of the Year	Lagaf'			X
1999	Actor	Gérard Depardieu	Le Comte de Monte-Cristo (The Count of Monte-Cristo)	TF1	X
1999	Actress	Véronique Genest	Julie Lescaut and Un amour de cousine	TF1	X
1999	Newscaster	Jean-Pierre Pernaut	13:00 news	TF1	X
1999	Three Best Channels (cable and satellite)			Planète, Eurosport, RTL9	X
1999	Youth Program		La planète de Donkey Kong	France 2	X
1999	Variety Show		Les Masters de Questions pour un champion by Julien Lepers	France 3	X
1999	Cultural Program		Les Thémas	Arte	
1999	Travel Program		Ushuaïa Nature by Nicolas Hulot	TF1	X
1999	Game Show		Pyramide, Patrice Laffont (host)	France 2	X
1999	Newsmagazine		Capital, Emmanuel Chain (host)	M6	X
1999	Sports Program		Stade 2, Pierre Sled (host)	France 2	X
1999	Educational Program		C'est pas sorcier	France 3	
1999	Documentary		Les Yeux dans les Bleus by Stéphane Meunier	Canal+	
1999	Television Series	Jean-Pierre Guérin (producer), Josée Dayan (director)	Le Comte de Monte-Cristo (The Count of Monte-Cristo)	TF1	X
1999	Screenwriting	Didier Decoin	Le Comte de Monte-Cristo (The Count of Monte-Cristo)	TF1	
1999	Music	Mano Solo	La Maison d'Alexina	Arte	
1999	Title Sequence		Strip-tease by Jan Bulthcel	France 3	
1999	Director (fiction)	Josée Dayan	Le Comte de Monte-Cristo (The Count of Monte-Cristo)	TF1	
1999	Director	Xavier Pujade-Loraine	Rince ta baignoire	France 2	
2000	Actor	Pierre Mondy	Les Cordier, juge et flic	TF1	X
2000	Actress	Mimie Mathy	Joséphine, ange gardien	TF1	X
2000	Host (cable and satellite) - female	Véronika Loubry	Le Hit	MCM	X
2000	Host (cable and satellite) - male	Patrick Sabatier	Pendant la pub	TMC	X
2000	Newscaster	Rachid Arhab and Carole Gaessler	13:00 news	France 2	X
2000	Variety Show		Le plus grand cabaret du monde by Patrick Sébastien	France 2	X
2000	Newsmagazine		Zone interdite	M6	X
2000	Travel Program		Faut pas rêver	France 3	X
2000	Musical Program		Taratata by Nagui	France 2	
2000	Sports Program		Téléfoot by Thierry Roland	TF1	X
2000	Game Show		Le Bigdil by Lagaf'	TF1	X
2000	Youth Program		Les Minikeums	France 3	X
2000	Television Special		Les Enfoirés en 2000	France 2	X
2000	TV movie		L'Institutrice (based on the novel by Claire Chazal)	TF1	X
2000	Cultural Program		Tout le monde en parle by Thierry Ardisson	France 2	
2000	Social Magazine		Ça se discute	France 2	X
2000	Educational Program	Marie Montuir, Élizabeth Tchoungui, François Busnel and Olivier Minne	Les Écrans du savoir	La 5ème	
2000	New Cable Show		La Route	Canal Jimmy	
2000	Documentary (series)		Strip-tease by Jan Bultheel	France 3	
2000	Documentary		Sur la terre des dinosaures	France 3	
2000	Television Series		Une famille formidable	TF1	X
2000	Screenwriting	Laurent Cantet and Gilles Marchand	Ressources humaines	Arte	
2000	Director (fiction)	Nadine Trintignant	Victoire ou la douleur des femmes	France 2	
2000	Director	Gérard Pullicino	Johnny à la Tour Eiffel	TF1	
2000	Honorary Award	David Douillet			
2001	Actor	Gérard Klein	L'Instit	France 2	X
2001	Actress	Véronique Genest	Julie Lescaut	TF1	X
2001	Host (cable and satellite) - male	Paul Amar	Recto/Verso	Paris Première	X
2001	Host (cable and satellite) - female	Denise Fabre	Boléro	TMC	X
2001	Newscaster	Jean-Pierre Pernaut	13:00 news	TF1	X
2001	Animated Program		Le Tour du monde en 80 jours (Around the World in 80 Days)	France 3	X
2001	Youth Program		C'est pas sorcier	France 3	X
2001	Sports Program		Tout le sport by Henri Sannier	France 3	X
2001	Educational Program		E=M6	M6	
2001	Travel Program		Ushuaïa Nature by Nicolas Hulot	TF1	X
2001	Cinema Show		Cérémonie des Césars by Edouard Baer	Canal+	X
2001	Comedy Show		On a tout essayé by Laurent Ruquier	France 2	X
2001	Variety Show		Un gars, une fille	France 2	X
2001	Social Magazine		Jour après jour by Jean-Luc Delarue	France 2	X
2001	Newsmagazine		Capital, Emmanuel Chain (host)	M6	X
2001	Cultural Program		Bouillon de culture	France 2	
2001	Game Show		Loft Story by Benjamin Castaldi	M6	X
2001	Musical Program		Serge, si tu nous regardes by Thierry Ardisson	France 2	
2001	Documentary		2001, la prise de l'Hôtel de Ville	France 3	
2001	Documentary (series)		Paris à tout prix	Canal+	
2001	TV movie		Fatou la Malienne	France 2	X
2001	Television Series		La Bicyclette bleue	France 2	X
2001	Screenwriting	Nina Companeez	Un Pique-nique chez Osiris	France 2	
2001	Director (fiction)	Nina Companeez	Un Pique-nique chez Osiris	France 2	
2001	Director	Don Kent	Médée	Arte	
2003	Actor	Francis Huster	Jean Moulin	TF1	X
2003	Actress	Mimie Mathy	Joséphine, ange gardien	TF1	X
2003	Newscaster	Jean-Pierre Pernaut	13:00 news	TF1	X
2003	News Show	Laurence Ferrari and Thomas Hugues	7 à 8	TF1	X
2003	Educational Program		Les Maternelles	France 5	
2003	Cultural Program		Des racines et des ailes by Patrick de Carolis	France 3	
2003	Game Show		Qui veut gagner des millions ?	TF1	X
2003	Musical Program		Tracks	Arte	
2003	Reality Show		Star Academy by Nikos Aliagas	TF1	X
2003	Youth Program		Ça Cartoon	Canal+	X
2003	Sports Program		Tour de France	France 2	X
2003	Variety Show		Le plus grand cabaret du monde	France 2	X
2003	Animated Program		L'Odyssée	M6	X
2003	Travel Program		Ushuaïa Nature by Nicolas Hulot	TF1	X
2003	Social Magazine		Ça se discute	France 2	X
2003	TV movie		Jean Moulin	TF1	X
2003	Documentary (series)		Strip-tease	France 3	
2003	Documentary		L'Odyssée de l'espèce	France 3	
2003	Television Series		Joséphine, ange gardien	TF1	X
2003	Television Series (cable or satellite)		Recto/Verso by Paul Amar	Paris Première	
2003	Screenwriting	Lionel Dutemple, Bruno Gaccio, Ahmed Hamidi and Julien Hervé	Les Guignols de l'info	Canal+	
2003	Director (fiction)	Yves Simoneau	Napoléon	France 2	
2003	Director	Jean-Luc Orabona	Des racines et des ailes	France 3	
