= Karine Baste =

French journalist

- Born: 11 October 1982 (age 42); Schœlcher, Martinique
- Other names: Karine Baste-Régis
- Occupation(s): Journalist; News presenter
- Years active: 2003–present
- Spouse: Patrick Régis
- Children: 1

Karine Baste (formerly Baste-Régis; born 11 October 1982) is a French journalist and news presenter from Martinique. She began her career as an image producer while interning at Société de Radiodiffusion et de télévision Française pour l'Outre-mer (RFO). Baste then worked as an editor of subjects relating to Saint Barthélemy and Saint-Martin before making her first on-screen appearance in 2007. She works for France Télévisions and has read the news on the Télématin, 13 heures and Journal de 20 heures programmes as well as on the France Info news channel.

== Biography ==
Baste was born on 11 October 1982 in the town of Schœlcher in Martinique. She is the daughter of the father who is a police inspector and her mother is a nurse. Baste is the youngest of five sisters and all of them share a close relationship; she and her siblings were instilled the value of work by her parents and was raised on land owned by her family. She was educated at Saint-Joseph de Cluny and then at Lycée Acajou in Le Lamentin, where she obtained her Baccalauréat. Upon leaving school, she became a graduate of the École Supérieure de Réalisation Audiovisuelle in Nice, Alpes-Maritimes in 2003; Baste had spent the previous three years studying at the school.

She began her career in broadcasting, working as an image producer while interning at Société de Radiodiffusion et de télévision Française pour l'Outre-mer (RFO). Following the completion of her internship, Baste moved to France and became a freelancer for Cannes TV. After two years, she moved to Guadeloupe, becoming the editor of subjects relating to Saint Barthélemy and Saint-Martin at RFO. In 2007, Baste had her first appearance on television, presenting the local news programme Magazine Caraïbe. She had made the appearance on short notice. Baste made the decision to return to Martinique in July 2009, and became the chair of debates and sports programmes on the Martinique 1re channel starting from 2011. In mid-2015, she presented the weekend news bulletin Soir 3 Weekend broadcast on Friday to Sunday on France 3 in place of Francis Letellier.

In 2016, Baste was chosen to read the overseas news from 6:00 in the morning on the 24 hour television news channel France Info from 1 September of that year. She got the job after an encounter with the channel's director Stéphane Dubun in Paris, and successfully applied for the position via telephone in July 2016. That year, she also hosted a programme on the Zika virus at the France Télévisions headquarters in Paris. Baste spent the next three television seasons at France Info before moving to join the breakfast television programme Télématin alongside Laurent Bignolas in 2019 as well as reading the news as a relief presenter on 13 heures at 1:00 in the afternoon on France 2. She has also worked as a contributor to the monthly debate magazine Résonance, presented the programme Caraïbe on an alternate basis with Sonia Laventure, contributed to the programme Caméra direct, and was on the Ça fait l'actu programme on France Info.

In September 2020, Baste was reassigned to be the relief presenter of the news programme Journal de 20 heures for Anne-Sophie Lapix in place of Julian Bugier who moved to 13 heures during weekdays from January 2021. She ended up replacing Lapix for a period of time during the following month. Baste made her final appearance on Télématin on 7 April 2021, so that she could focus on being the relief presenter of Journal de 20 heures full-time before the 2021/22 season. She is on the board of France Télévisions's directors as a director representing employees.

== Personal life ==
She has the sobriquet KBR. Baste has been married to the journalist Patrick Régis and they have one child. She does not discuss her private life with the media. She changed her name from Baste-Régis to Baste in late 2021.
