= Vire (disambiguation) =

Vire may refer to:

- Vire (river), a river in north-western France
- Vire, a commune in north-western France
- Vire, Dahanu, a village in Maharashtra, India
