= Soir 3 =

- Former Soir 3 titles from October 2010, also formerly used as a weekend edition title from March 2013 - January 2018
- Genre: News programme
- Presented by: Patricia Loison and Louis Laforge (Mon-Thu), Francis Letellier (Fri-Sun)
- Country of origin: France
- Original language: French

Production
- Running time: 60 minutes (Mon-Thu); Varies typically from 20–30 minutes (Fri-Sun)

Original release
- Network: France 3
- Release: 1978 – 2019

Related
- FR3 Actualités (FR3); Grand Soir 3 (France 3); Le 24h (France Info)

Soir 3 (literally Evening 3) is the former late-night newscast of the French public television network France 3. The program, FR3's first national news bulletin, was launched in 1978 by its then head of news Jean-Marie Cavada. The bulletin was shown at 10:30 pm for 60 minutes from Monday to Thursday, and was presented by Louis Laforge and Patricia Loison. The weekend editions, simply known as Soir 3 was broadcast at various times on Fridays and at weekends, when the regular anchor was Francis Letellier.

The newscast was axed in a cost-cutting move in 2019 with a single-anchor replacement, "Le 23h", broadcast instead on the Franceinfo channel.

== Format ==
=== Weekdays ===
For most of the year the weekday editions of Soir 3 were broadcast at 10:30 pm from the set of the live cultural discussion show Ce soir (ou jamais!), which were broadcast immediately afterwards. During certain periods, such as over the summer break and on other holidays, the programme was however shown at various times and comes from the France 3 news studio. In addition to a summary of the day's news, the programme format included several regular features such as sans détours (without detours, an extended interview with a prominent figure or expert) and lu, vu, entendu (read, seen and heard, which highlights a cultural medium such as a book, album or play). The latter of these were usually the last item in the bulletin. The show, Ce soir (ou jamais!), has since transferred to France 2 in March 2013, meaning that Grand Soir 3 was then broadcast live from the France 3 news studio.

Stéphane Lippert has been the interim weekday host of Soir 3 since September 2010, replacing Carole Gaessler who left the programme after two years to become the anchor of France 3's main evening news bulletin, 19/20. Lippert was previously the host of the network's lunchtime news programme 12/13. Gaessler had succeeded Marie Drucker in September 2008 after the latter joined the news team of sister station France 2; Drucker had in turn held the position from September 2005 when she replaced the duo of Audrey Pulvar and Louis Laforge. Drucker stood aside for a spell in the run-up to the 2007 French presidential election after details of her relationship with Minister of Overseas France François Baroin were made public. During the period Drucker switched positions with Laforge, now host of the documentary series Des racines et des ailes. Other past hosts of Soir 3 have included Christine Ockrent and Henri Sannier. From 25 March 2013, it was then known as Grand Soir 3 and became an hour-long news and discussion programme, broadcasting from 10:30pm to 11:30pm. The Grand Soir 3's last anchors were Louis Laforge and Patricia Loison.

Originally airing at around 11 pm, the weekday programme moved to 10:30 pm on 5 January 2009, as France 3 revamped its schedule to accommodate the government-mandated end of advertising on France Télévisions stations during prime time. A five-minute pre-recorded regional news opt-out was introduced as part of the revamp. However, the programme has since expanded to 60 minutes on weekdays, but the weekend editions remain unchanged.

=== Weekends ===
The weekend (Friday to Sunday) editions of Soir 3, presented by Francis Letellier since June 2006, have several notable differences from their weeknight counterparts. Since Ce soir (ou jamais!) does not air at weekends, the programmes were broadcast year-round from the main France 3 news studio, which also houses the national lunchtime (12/13) and evening (19/20) news broadcasts, and do not possess a fixed slot in the schedule. Some segments, such as lu, vu, entendu, do not feature in the weekend edition. In September 2010 the Sunday edition of the programme was lengthened by 10 minutes to include an extended political interview.

== Ratings ==
The 2008 annual report of France Télévisions claimed an average audience of 1.4 million viewers for Soir 3. Figures from audience measurement firm Médiamétrie put the programme's share of viewing at 16.3% on 29 July 2008, a night on which it recorded 2 million viewers, its best ratings of the year. France 3's average audience share for the month of July 2008 was 13.2%.
