= Jean Drucker =

French television executive

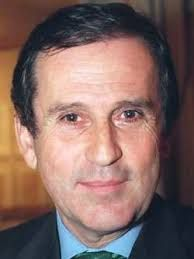
- Born: 12 August 1941; Vire, France
- Died: 18 April 2003 (aged 61); Mollégès, France
- Resting place: Passy Cemetery
- Education: Sciences Po, ÉNA
- Partner: Anaïs Jeanneret
- Children: 2, including Marie Drucker
- Relatives: Michel Drucker (brother); Léa Drucker (niece)

Jean Drucker (12 August 1941 – 18 April 2003) was a French Television executive. He was born in Vire (Calvados) and died of a heart attack in Mollégès (Bouches-du-Rhône).

== Family history ==
Of Jewish heritage, his parents arrived in France in 1925 and were naturalised in 1937. His father, Abraham Drucker, was born in Țibucani in Romania, while his mother's family is from Austria.

== Private life ==
Drucker was the father of TV journalist Marie Drucker. He was the companion of Anaïs Jeanneret, with whom he had a son, Vincent Drucker. He was the brother of TV host Michel Drucker and of Professor of Medicine Jacques Drucker, and was also the uncle of actress Léa Drucker.

== Career ==
A brilliant student from a family for whom "scholarly excellence was a sacred duty", Drucker studied at Sciences Po (Political Science) before entering the École nationale d'administration (ENA). He completed his internship at the ENA Prefecture of Vesoul.

After being chosen as an ambassador to the Minister for Cultural Affairs André Malraux, he became the cultural attaché to Tehran.

He began his career in television in 1970, as technical advisor to the Director General of the Office de Radiodiffusion-Télévision Française (ORTF). He was named Program Director of his first television network in 1971. In 1975, he became director general of the Société française de production. He became vice-president and CEO of the Compagnie luxembourgeoise de télédiffusion (CLT) in 1980.

He was named Président directeur général, (CEO) of Antenne 2 in 1985, and the CEO of Métropole Télévision in 1987. He remained in this position until 2000 when he became President of the Board of Directors, a position he held until his death in 2003.

== Honours ==
A studio was named after him in 2008, by French President Nicolas Sarkozy and Drucker's brother Michel.
