= Rachid Arhab =

French journalist (born 1955)

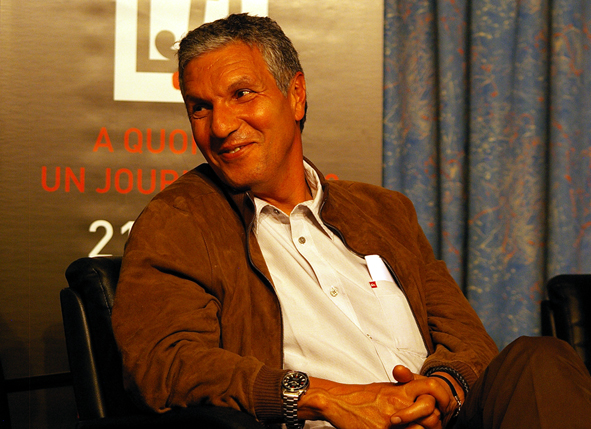
- Rachid Arhab in 2008
- Born: 26 June 1955 (age 70); Larbaâ Nath Irathen, Algeria
- Occupations: TV journalist Member of the CSA (2007-2013)
- Spouse: Sylvie Gauthier
- Relatives: Ilona Mitrecey (step-daughter)

Rachid Arhab (born 26 June 1955 in Larbaâ Nath Irathen in Algeria) is a French journalist and a member of the Conseil supérieur de l'audiovisuel (CSA).

== Early life ==
Born on 26 June 1955 in Fort-National (now named Larbaâ Nath Irathen), in a mountainous Kabyle region of northern Algeria, Arhab spent his childhood in Fameck, near Thionville in Lorraine. He obtained French nationality in 1992.

After studying journalism in Strasbourg, he worked as a journalist on FR3 Nancy in 1977, then in Reims and in Paris.

== TV career ==
=== News broadcasts ===
In 1985 he joined Politique Intérieure on Antenne 2, where he became the head of department in 1990. In the summer, he hosted the news broadcasting on France 2 from 1992 to 1994, while he continued his work as a reporter for Envoyé spécial and Géopolis. In October 1997, he was appointed deputy editor of France 2 news.

From September 1998 to September 2000, he presented the news broadcasting of 1:00 pm on France 2 alongside Carole Gaessler before their replacement by Gérard Holtz.

=== Shows ===
Arhab daily presented Ecomatin on France 5, and two years later, Dans la lumière on France 2.

From 2000, he hosted on France 2 J'ai rendez-vous avec vous. Every Sunday, in a French city, he collected the viewers wishings who wanted to share their views on the news. The show was stopped after his appointment to the Conseil supérieur de l'audiovisuel by Jean-Louis Debré in January 2007.

== Awards ==
Arhab was promoted to the rank of Chevalier of the Légion d'Honneur.

For the co-presentation of the news broadcasting on France 2 with Carole Gaessler, he won the 7 d'or for best television news presenter in 2000.
