= Bruno Masure =

French journalist and television presenter (born 1947)

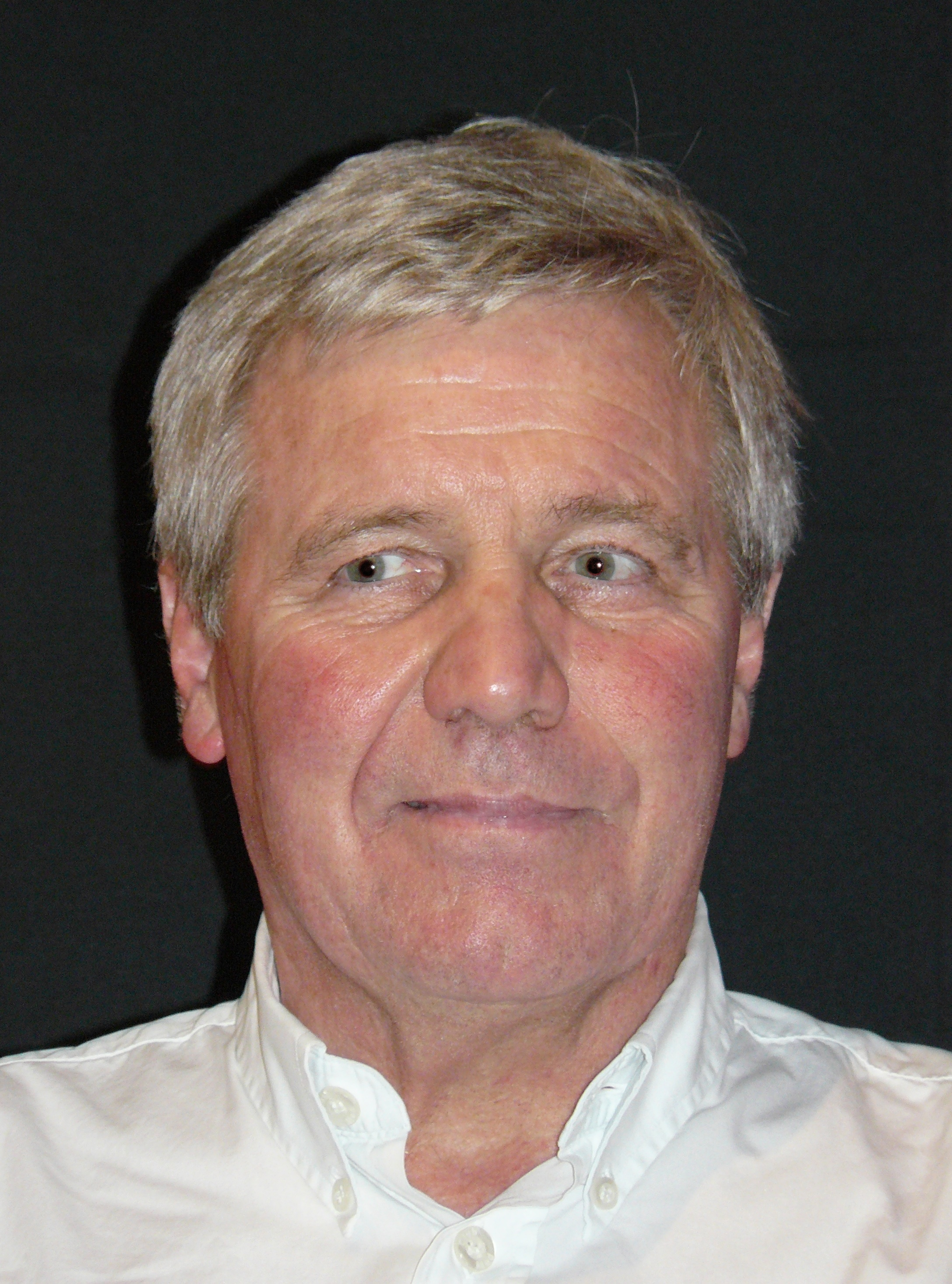
- Born: 14 October 1947 (age 78); Lille, Nord, France
- Occupations: Journalist, news anchor, television presenter, radio presenter, author
- Years active: 1968–present
- Notable credit: Journal de 20 heures
- Television: TF1 (1984–90); France 2 (1992–97)

Bruno Masure (born 14 October 1947) is a French journalist, news anchor and television presenter.

== Early life and education ==
Bruno Masure was born in Lille in the department of Nord. He graduated with a degree in history, economic science and political science. He also graduated at the Institut d'urbanisme de Paris.

== Career ==
Masure began his career working for the tutorial at the Faculté de droit de Lille. He then did an internship at the political service of the daily newspaper Le Monde. He later became a political journalist on RMC from 1973 to 1975 and on TF1 since 1975, where he covered the campaign of François Mitterrand in 1981.

A famous reporter on TF1, Masure hosted the Journal de 20 heures from July 1984 to July 1990. From September 1990 to October 1997, he hosted the Journal de 20 heures on Antenne 2 which later became France 2 in 1992.

From 1999 to 2003, Masure was a columnist in the program Vivement dimanche prochain hosted by Michel Drucker on the same channel. He was from 2005 to 2011 a journalist and columnist on France Inter in the program Le Fou du roi with Stéphane Bern.

== Books ==
- La télé rend fou... mais j'me soigne !, Plon, 1987
- À pleins tubes, Orban, 1989
- Le dictionnaire analphabétique, Orban, 1990
- Leurre de vérité, Plon, 1993
- Débloc notes, Plon, 1998
- Chérie, pense à changer de millénaire, Plon, 2000
- Loft présidentiel, Plon, 2002
- Un dernier vers pour la route, Plon, 2002
- Comment se fait-ce ?, Presses de la Cité, 2004
- Enquête sur mon assassinat, Chiflet & Cie, 2006
- Les chats, Hugo Image, 2007
- Journalistes à la niche ? : De Pompidou à Sarkozy, chronique des liaisons dangereuses entre médias et politiques, Hugo et Compagnie, 2009
- Le journal d'une curée de campagne, Chiflet & Cie, 2011
- La télé rend définitivement fou, Chiflet & Cie, 2015

== Honours ==
Bruno Masure received a 7 d'Or for the best presenter of the daily news in 1988, 1990, 1993, 1995 and 1998.
