= N'oubliez pas les paroles! =

- Show's logo
- Created by: Jeff Aploff
- Directed by: Gérard Pullicino, Serge Khalfon
- Starring: Nagui; Patrick Sabatier (June-Dec 2008)
- Theme music composer: Gérard Pullicino
- Country of origin: France
- Original language: French
- No. of episodes: More than 6000 (including Maestro version)

Production
- Production company: Air Productions

Original release
- Network: France 2
- Release: 15 December 2007

N'oubliez pas les paroles! is a French televised series based on the international series Don't Forget the Lyrics!. It broadcasts on the television station France 2 as of 15 December 2007 and is produced by Air Productions. The show has already broadcast for more than 5000 episodes. The 500th show was on 23 February 2011. On 5 September 2011, the contest was restructured under a new formula. The 5000th show was on 15 April 2021. On this occasion, the 2 biggest winners of the show, Kevin and Margaux played for the Chronic Fatigue Syndrome Association. Some famous French singers also appeared such as Kendji Girac, Vianney, Claudio Capéo and Pascal Obispo.

On January 7, 2013, another new formula was launched, this time with a champion "maestro".

The program is hosted by Nagui. It was a weekly show until 28 June 2008. After that date, the show became daily and was broadcast at 7 pm. The host for the daily shows was Patrick Sabatier for almost half a year, when Nagui took over once again on 12 December 2008.

== Accompaniment ==
The show has a permanent big band, called “les Zikos (et Zikettes)”, which accompanies the contestants. The band is made up of the following:

- Fabien Haimovici - singer and percussion
- Magali Ripoll - singer, accordion and keyboards
- Karen Khochafian - violin and backing vocals
- Alexis Bourguignon - trumpet
- Julien Raffin - saxophone, clarinet, flute and harmonica
- Maurice Zemmour (Momo) - bass
- Christian Rakotoarivony - guitar
- Jean-Luc Paris - guitar
- Francois Legrand - keyboards
- Pierre Lucbert - drums
- Nathalie Loriot - backing vocals
- Jessie Fasano - backing vocals
- Manu Vince - backing vocals
- Michael Joussein - trombone

== First version ==
Prizes against knowing a certain number of missing word lyrics were:

Level	Amount	Words
10	€100,000	15
9	€50,000	12
8	€35,000	11
7	€20,000	10
6	€10,000	8
5	€5,000	6
4	€2,500	5
3	€1,000	4
2	€500	3
1	€250	3

One couple managed to win the jackpot by recovering 13 missing words on "Allumez le Feu" by Johnny Hallyday. However, the couple did not get any money because it was a special episode dedicated to Sidaction. This episode was aired on 25 March 2010.

== Maestro version ==
=== The Duel ===
The "maestro" (the winner of the previous episode) walks onstage with the host, who recaps the maestro's number of consecutive victories and total money winnings. Then, a challenger walks onstage. The challenger sings a song of their choosing accompanied by the band, and then has a brief conversation with the host about their personal background.

The maestro and the challenger compete against one another. Until August 11, 2014, the challenger could choose to go first. Since September 1, 2014, the maestro goes first.

In round one, the competitors take turns singing a song from one of five categories: one worth 10 points with two missing words, one worth 20 points with three missing words, one worth 30 points with four or five missing words, one worth 40 points with six or seven missing words, and one worth 50 points with eight or nine missing words. On special occasions (feast days, start of the school year, etc.), the proposed categories and songs are often related to the occasion.

In every category, the competitor can choose one of two songs; a short excerpt of the original recording of each is played. After the competitor chooses, Nagui announces the number of missing words. The candidate begins to sing along with the live band, and the words are shown on a screen. Then, when the music and the display of the text stop, the competitor must continue to sing, providing the missing words. It is not necessary to know the melody, or even to sing: the only requirement is to give the exactly correct words.

The words proposed by the competitor are shown on the screen. The competitor is permitted to change the shown words as much as desired. Once the competitor believes their words to be correct, they say, "Je bloque ces paroles". Points are only scored if the words are exactly correct (for example, a plural instead of a singular or a bad personal pronoun are considered errors, and no points would be scored).

Once four of the five categories are completed (two for the maestro and two for the challenger), round two begins. The theme is, "It is the same song". The competitor with the lower score leaves the stage, isolating themselves on an armchair, their back to their opponent and to the public, with sound-blocking headphones on. The other competitor stays onstage, whereupon the song for this round is revealed. The goal is to sing as many consecutive words exactly correctly as possible from this song. The band begins playing, and the competitor sings along with the first few lines (which are displayed on the screen). Then, the words to the song stop being displayed, and competitor sings as long as possible without making an error.

As soon as the competitor makes an error (or, if the competitor manages to sing to the end of the song without making an error), the music stops. The competitor scores one point for every word they manage to sing correctly. Then, the second competitor returns from isolation, and is told the total score of the first competitor. The second competitor then attempts the same feat (singing as many missing words exactly correctly as possible from the song).

It can happen that the first competitor sings enough words of the song to make the game out of reach for the second competitor, even if the latter were to sing every word correctly. In this case, the second competitor leaves the stage without attempting the song. Prior to the first competitor beginning the song, Nagui reveals the total number of missing words to be sung, and thus reveals the number of words the first competitor would have to sing to make the game out of reach. When either the first or the second competitor sings enough words to win the game, a dinging bell noise is played, at which point the competitor can choose to stop singing.

At the end of the second round, the competitor with the higher score becomes the maestro and is given the silver microphone. If the score is tied, the existing maestro wins. At this point, no matter how much money is won in the final round, the winner is guaranteed to appear on the following episode.

=== The final ===
The maestro is given a choice of two songs, and must pick one. The maestro must then attempt to sing the exactly correct words from up to five different parts of the song.

To begin, there will be two or three missing words from towards the beginning of the song. The band starts playing, the words are displayed on screen, and the maestro sings along. Once the words disappear, the maestro must provide the missing words, and when they do, the music stops. The maestro can modify these words as much as desired until confirming them. If the words are correct, the maestro wins 1 000 €.

Every time the maestro gets the words correct, they can decide to continue, or to stop. If they continue, then: the song continues from where it left off, and the maestro must find between three and five missing words for 2 000 €, then between five and eight missing words for 5 000 €, then between eight and eleven missing words for 10 000 €, then between eleven and seventeen missing words for 20 000 €. Every time the maestro chooses to continue, the missing words are further and further along in the song; the maestro is always allowed to modify any words they sing as much as they like before confirming them.

At any of the five levels (1 000, 2 000, 5 000, 10 000, or 20 000 €), if the maestro does not get the words exactly correct, they lose any winnings they would have won from a previous level. For example, if the maestro gets the words correct at level two (and hence has 2 000 €), but chooses to go onto level three and gets the words wrong, they do not keep the 2 000 € that they would have won had they chosen to stop after level two. However, they still get to return next episode, no matter what, and they keep any money they won in previous episodes.

Exactly once during the final round, the maestro can choose the "initials" option: the first letter of each word in the exactly correct lyrics is shown. For example, suppose at level three the correct lyrics were "Moi je pense à l'enfant". Then, the screen would display "M__ J__ P__ À L' E__": no hint is given about the length of each word - unless the word is only one letter long (which includes words composed of a single letter and an apostrophe), in which case the letter is written alone (with its possible apostrophe), without "__" behind it, giving its length (as seen in the example) - but the correct first letters are all shown. Accents are also scrupulously respected. The maestro can use this to confirm their intuition about the correct lyrics.

== 100% Tubes Special ==
A special episode aired on 11 June 2016 featuring 8 celebrities playing for up to €150,000 to be split evenly among four charities. The celebrities in this edition included Gérard Holtz (sports journalist and Tour de France analyst for France 2), Michel Cymes (journalist), Valérie Damidot (TV presenter), Michaël Gregorio (comedian/impressionist), Amir (French representative at the Eurovision Song Contest 2016), Iris Mittenaere (Miss France 2016), Valérie Bègue (TV personality) and Tony Saint Laurent (actor).

The participants were divided into four pairs, each representing a different charity. In the first round, the player in each pair with the most points advanced to the semifinal while the other was eliminated. The semifinal is played the same way, the winners of each of the four pairs facing off against each other with the player in each duel with the most points moving on to the final.
In the final round, the two remaining players worked together to correctly remember the lyrics to a song at each prize level to earn a higher amount of money, an incorrect guess at any level would put them back at zero (the pair could stop at any time and take the money they've already earned). Gérard Holtz and Amir took on Papaoutai by Stromae in the final round and stopped after 4 correct guesses, earning €90,000 for the charities.

== See also ==
- List of French Adaptations of Television Series from Other Countries
