= Carole Gaessler =

French television journalist (born 1968)

- Born: 23 February 1968 (age 58); Thionville, France
- Education: Panthéon-Sorbonne University; Institut de journalisme Bordeaux-Aquitaine
- Occupation: Journalist
- Notable credit(s): Le Journal de 13 heures - Carole Gaessler et Rachid Arhab (1998 - 2000); Soir 3 (weekends, 1996 - 1998); Soir 3 (weekdays, 2008 - 2010); 19/20 (weekdays, 2010 - present)
- Children: 2

Carole Gaessler (born 23 February 1968) is a French television journalist. Since September 2010 she has presented the Monday to Thursday editions of 19/20, the main evening news bulletin of France 3.

== Biography ==
After a preparatory literature class and studying classics at La Sorbonne, she continued her studies at the IUT de journalisme de Bordeaux. Still young for a journalist, she took her first job, while still a student, at the Républicain lorrain.

From 1990 to 1991, she worked at RTL TV at Metz (now RTL9) where she worked as an editor for France 3 Lorraine Champagne-Ardenne. In 1996, Carole Gaessler worked on Soir 3 presented by Henri Sannier on France 3.

Between 1998 and 2000, she presented the lunchtime news bulletin 13 heures on France 2 together with Rachid Arhab.

After two years in Australia, she became in February 2003 the substitute anchor for David Pujadas on the weekday editions of France 2's evening news programme 20 heures, a position she held until August 2006. During this period, Gaessler co-hosted election night coverage of the 2004 French regional and cantonal elections alongside Daniel Bilalian and, with David Pujadas, live coverage of the result of the French European Constitution referendum in 2005. At the end of 2004, Gaessler also presented the magazine programme on France 2 Immersion Totale, in which three teams were immersed in a public place to watch, listen to, and film anonymous men and women and discussing their "reel heroes". At the same time, she presented La France en héritage, a special show on France 2, dedicated to French history for the European Heritage Days.

Gaessler later became the editor in chief and presenter of the weekly consumer news magazine C'est notre affaire on France 5.

In September 2008, she succeeded Marie Drucker as presenter of Soir 3 from Mondays to Thursdays on France 3. Claire Fournier replaced her as the host of C'est notre affaire.

In September 2010, she succeeded Laurent Bignolas as presenter of 19/20 from Mondays to Thursdays on France 3.

=== Private life ===
Carole Gaessler has a daughter (born in 1999) and a son (born in 2004).

== Awards ==
- 10 January 1999 : elected "Femme en Or 99", communication category, in Courchevel.
- April 2000 : elected honorary president of the Association of former students of Charlemagne School in Thionville (Moselle).
- 22 October 2000 : Awards in the 14th 7 d'or.

== Notes and references ==
Preceded by Patrick Chêne	Co-host of Le journal de 13 heures on France 2 (1998-2000)	Succeeded by Gérard Holtz
Preceded by Catherine Matausch	Presenter of Soir 3 (weekends) on France 3 (1996-1998)	Succeeded by Louis Laforge
Preceded by Marie Drucker	Presenter of Soir 3 (weekdays) on France 3 (2008-2010)	Succeeded by Stéphane Lippert
