= Jean-Pierre Pernaut =

French broadcaster (1950–2022)

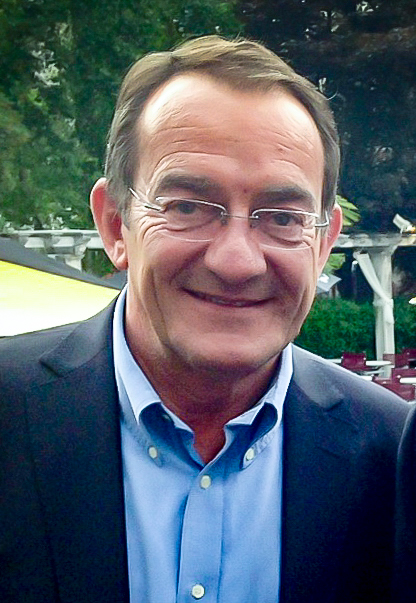
- Born: 8 April 1950; Amiens, France
- Died: 2 March 2022 (aged 71); Paris, France
- Employer: TF1
- Known for: Host of the Journal de 13 heures (1988-2020)
- Spouse: Nathalie Marquay (m. 2007)
- Children: 4

Jean-Pierre Pernaut (French: [ʒɑ̃ pjɛʁ pɛʁno]; 8 April 1950 – 2 March 2022) was a French news presenter and broadcaster. He was widely known simply by his initials, JPP.

== Biography ==
Pernaut was born in Amiens, Somme, on 8 April 1950. The regular presenter of station TF1's lunchtime news bulletin, the 13 Heures (1pm) between 1988 and 2020, Pernaut's combination of avuncular personality and authoritative delivery made him one of France's most popular news readers.

Also editor-in-chief of the bulletin, Pernaut long promoted a deliberate policy of trivial content in each edition, usually running items about local culture and traditional crafts towards the end of the broadcast.

The approach won a regular audience of between seven and eight million for the 13 Heures, a considerable figure for a lunchtime news programme.

From 1991 to 2010 he was also the longtime presenter of Combien ça coûte ? (How much does that cost?), a monthly consumer programme, again on TF1. Furthermore, from 1988 until his death Pernaut served on the board of directors of TF1 Group as a representative of the firm's employees.

Pernaut, partner of former Miss France winner Nathalie Marquay, published his best-selling memoirs, Pour tout vous dire.... (To tell you everything... ), in 2005. Shortly before that, he published two volumes of Les magnifiques métiers de l'artisanat (Splendid trades of the craft industry), which were glossy, but informative, tomes devoted to the subjects which have made his news bulletins so distinctive.

Pernaut died from lung cancer in Paris on 2 March 2022, at the age of 71.
