= Taratata =

French television music show

Taratata is a French television music show showcasing live and pre-recorded footage of current acts. Presented by Nagui since its début in 1993, the show was initially shown on Antenne 2 (France 2). The show often involved surprise and unlikely duets, as well as brief interviews with the artists. Taratata was cancelled in 2000, but returned in April 2005 on the public French network France 4 once a week on prime time, France 3, and late night once a month on France 2 and radio station Virgin Radio. Artists including Devendra Banhart, Katie Melua and Ayo made their French TV debuts on the show. The show's chief lighting technician, Jean-Philippe Bourdon, was awarded two Sept d'or awards in 1994 and 1995.

The show featured unique duets and highlighted new artists and used different presenters for each episode. These aspects, and the general emphasis on original music, led the Conseil supérieur de l'audiovisuel to identify Taratata as a uniquely creative show on French TV in April 2009.

The show aired throughout Europe on TV5MONDE Europe on Saturday nights. The show is also franchised to Dubai Television in Arabic with an almost identical format to its French counterpart.

Well known international artists who have performed at Taratara include: Ed Sheeran, David Bowie, Depeche Mode, Toto, Alicia Keys, Muse, Scorpions and Vanessa Mae.

On 31 May 2013, France Télévisions announced that the decision had been made to cancel the program. Despite the announcement, the show continued in a web-only format and a concert was organised at Zénith de Paris on 10 October 2013. The last show was recorded on 13 June 2013 and was broadcast on 12 July 2013.

On 24 October 2015, the show returned as Taratata 100% live.
