= Claire Fournier =

French television journalist

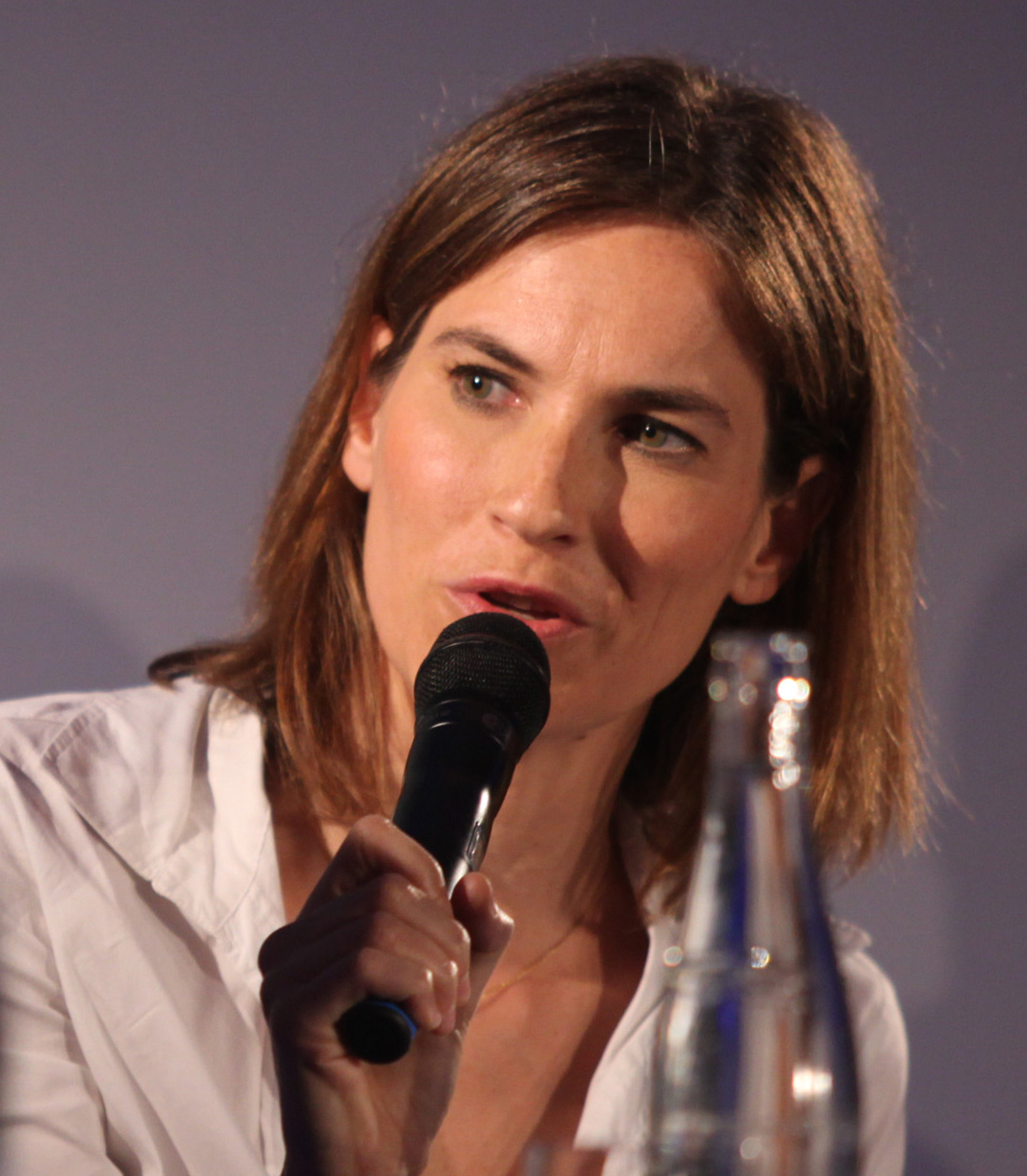
- Claire Fournier in 2010 during a conference of the Foundation for Political Innovation
- Born: December 8, 1972 (age 52); Tours in France
- Occupation: Television journalist

Claire Fournier (born December 8, 1972, in Tours, Indre-et-Loire) is a French television journalist.

== Career ==
After presenting the economic news show on Bloomberg TV France, Fournier became the New York correspondent for the same channel, where she covered cultural events and economic news. In 2004, she was appointed as the Paris correspondent for CNBC Europe. She then became the editor-in-chief of the Journal de l’économie on the continuous news channel i>Télé, where she also presented i>Bourse as well as economic and finance subjects and news programs.

In September 2008, she joined France 5 to succeed Carole Gaessler in presenting the show C'est notre affaire. In late November 2008, she co-hosted with Nicolas Beytout the debate La France en faillite on France 5, avec Laurence Parisot, Michel Rocard ou encore Éric Woerth featuring guests like Laurence Parisot, Michel Rocard, and Éric Woerth. After the cancellation of C'est notre affaire in 2013, she worked on documentaries for France 5, notably about business figures François Pinault and Bernard Arnault. Directed by Antoine Coursat, the documentary titled Les frères ennemis du luxe was aired on France 5 in 2014 as part of the "Duels" collection.

Fournier returned to i>Télé in August 2014, where she co-hosted La matinale week-end during the summer and provided her economic commentary. She also presented daily economic reports alongside Bruce Toussaint on Team Toussaint, the morning news program starting from September 2014.

In August 2017, Fournier joined La Chaîne Info (LCI). She provided the economic editorials.

Starting December 2023, she wrote and presented a podcast on menopause titled Chaud dedans, produced and broadcast on the Binge Audio platform.

For the 2021/2022 season, Fournier presented LCI MIDI with Julien Arnaud.

From 2022 to 2025, Fournier was again in charge of the economic editorials.

Since 2025, Fournier has co-hosted LCI's weekend morning show with Guillaume Cérin.

== Private life ==
Fournier is married to journalist Julian Bugier. They have two children: Lucien, born in 2011, and Gabrielle, born in 2013.
