= Miss Europe 1988 =

International beauty pageant

- Date: 8 May 1988
- Venue: Ragusa, Sicily, Italy
- Entrants: 23
- Placements: 13
- Withdrawals: Luxembourg & Switzerland
- Returns: Scotland & Wales
- Winner: Michela Rocco di Torrepadula; Italy

Miss Europe 1988 was the 45th edition of the Miss Europe pageant and the 34th edition under the Mondial Events Organization. It was held in Teatro Duemila Ragusa, Sicily, Italy on 8 May 1988. Michela Rocco di Torrepadula of Italy was crowned Miss Europe 1988 by outgoing titleholder Juncal Rivero Fadrique Castilla of Spain.

== Results ==
=== Placements ===
Placement	Contestant
Miss Europe 1988	Italy – Michela Rocco di Torrepadula
1st Runner-Up	Poland – Ewa Monika Nowosadko
2nd Runner-Up	Turkey – Şebnem Tan
3rd Runner-Up	Iceland – Magnea Lovisa Magnúsdóttir
4th Runner-Up	Israel – Limor Magen
Top 13	Belgium – UNKNOWN; Finland – Minna Susanna Rinnetmaki; Greece – Ariadne Mylona; Holland – Mascha ten Haaf; Norway – Hege Arnesen; Spain – Ana Jesús Rebollos Fernández; Sweden – Annelie Eriksson; Wales – Nicola Gail Davies

== Contestants ==
- Austria – UNKNOWN
- Belgium – UNKNOWN
- Cyprus – UNKNOWN
- Denmark – Janne Montell
- Finland – Minna Susanna Rinnetmaki
- France – Nathalie Marquay
- Germany – Renate Budina
- Gibraltar – Isabella Serra
- Greece – Ariadne Mylona
- Holland – Mascha ten Haaf
- Iceland – Magnea Lovisa Magnúsdóttir
- Israel – Limor Magen
- Italy – Michela Rocco di Torrepadula
- Malta – UNKNOWN
- Norway – Hege Arnesen
- Poland – Ewa Monika Nowosadko
- Portugal – Helena Isabel da Cunha Laureano
- Scotland – Eileen Ann Catterson
- Spain – Ana Jesús Rebollos Fernández
- Sweden – Annelie Eriksson
- Turkey – Şebnem Tan
- Wales – Nicola Gail Davies
- Yugoslavia – UNKNOWN

== Notes ==
=== Withdrawals ===
- Luxembourg
- Switzerland

=== Returns ===
- Scotland
- Wales

== "Comité Officiel et International Miss Europe" 1987 Competition ==
Miss Europa 1987
- Date: 27 May 1987
- Venue: Frankfurt, Germany
- Entrants: 16+
- Winner: Sandrina Rossi; France

The competition took place in Frankfurt, Germany. There were at least 16 delegates all from their own countries. At the end, Sandrina Rossi of France was crowned as Miss Europa 1987. Rossi succeeded her predecessor Raquel Bruhn (Rachel Bruhn) of Sweden.

=== Placements ===
Final results	Contestant
Miss Europa 1987	France – Sandrina Rossi

=== Contestants ===
- France – Sandrina Rossi
- Holland – Judith Schimmel
- Norway – Hege Rasmussen

N.B Notably, the year 1988 also saw a separate contest in Helsinki, Finland, where Soviet contestant Yekaterina Chilichkina was awarded a Miss Europe title in November, reflecting competing organizations claiming the pageant name during the late Cold War era.
