= Emmanuel Chain =

French producer, journalist and former television host (born 1962)

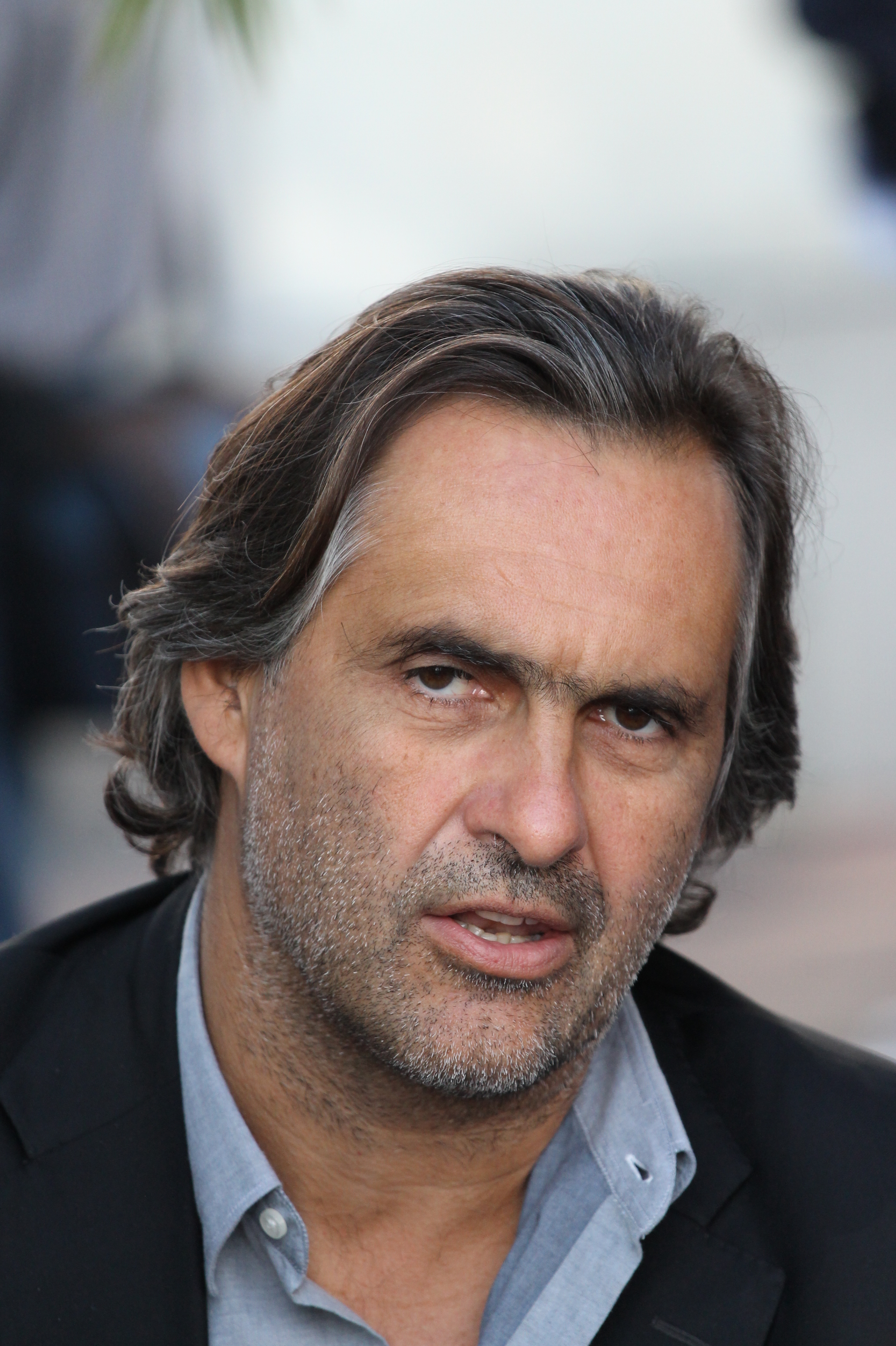
- Emmanuel Chain
- Born: 5 August 1962 (age 63); Neuilly-sur-Seine, France
- Education: HEC Paris
- Occupation: Television journalist

Emmanuel Chain, born August 5, 1962, in Neuilly-sur-Seine (Hauts-de-Seine), is a French producer, journalist and former television host.

== Life ==
Chain is best known for having hosted the economic program Capital on the M6 channel, from 1988 to 2003, for which he personally won three 7 d'Or.

He attended secondary school at Collège Stanislas de Paris and at Lycée Henri-IV and graduated from HEC Paris, in the class of 1985, where he was a classmate of François-Henri Pinault. From 2015 to 2018, he was the president of the alumni association, HEC Alumni.

Emmanuel Chain is a member of the Le Siècle and the club Galilée (a professional think tank), as well as of the Young Leader program of the French-American Foundation (1999).
