= Karine Giboulo =

Canadian artist (born 1980)

- Born: 1980 (age 45–46); Ste-Émélie de l'Énergie, Quebec
- Known for: Sculptor, maker of miniature dioramas
- Website: www.karinegiboulo.com

Karine Giboulo (born 1980) is a Canadian artist known for her miniature sculptural dioramas.

== Work ==
Giboulo's miniature dioramas often have a political undertone. Her 2014 work Hyperland presented a multi-level diorama that depicted scenes of consumer excess, topped by a naturalistic landscape. She has modeled numerous sculptures that comment on contemporary social issues, including Chinese factories and migrant refugees. Her 2016 exhibition at the Canadian Museum of Civilisation, titled Cités Bidon modeled in miniature the Haitian slums of Port au Prince known as Democracy Village.

The McMichael Canadian Art Collection presented a retrospective of her work in 2013.

== Collections ==
Her work is included in the collections of the Musée national des beaux-arts du Québec, the Montreal Museum of Fine Arts and the McMichael Canadian Art Collection.
