= Paul Amar =

French journalist and television presenter (born 1950)

- Born: 11 January 1950 (age 76); Constantine, Algeria
- Education: Centre de formation des journalistes
- Occupations: Journalist, television presenter
- Years active: 1971–present
- Television: Journal de 20 heures (France 2); Dimanche Midi Amar (France 2); Recto-Verso (Paris Première); D'un monde à l'autre (France 2); On aura tout lu (France 5); États Généraux (France 5); Revu et corrigé (France 5)

Paul Amar (born 11 January 1950) is a French journalist and television presenter.

== Life and career ==
Paul Amar graduated at the CFJ (Centre de formation des journalistes) of Paris. He began his career in 1971 at France Inter as a war correspondent in Phnom Penh, and then as a correspondent in Washington.

In 1979, he joined Antenne 2 as a reporter. In 1980, he presented the night news and became chief of the political service in 1983. Since 1990, he presented the evening news 19/20 on FR3, and since 1992, the French evening news Journal de 20 heures on France 2. He was forced to resign after hosting, on 1 June 1994, a debate between Jean-Marie Le Pen and Bernard Tapie during the campaign preceding the European election, in which he proposed boxing gloves to both opponents.

Paul Amar then joined Paris Première to host the Journal de 20 heures. From 1996 to 1998, he presented on TF1 a debate titled Le Monde de Léa, before presenting Dimanche Midi Amar on France 2 for two years. From 1999 to 2004, he joined again Paris Première to interview every week for 52 minutes a personality in Recto-Verso, with which he won a 7 d'Or in November 2004.

From 1995 to 1999, he presented D'un monde à l'autre on France 2 on Monday evening. In 2001, he joined France 5 to present On aura tout lu and since April 2005, États Généraux, from September 2005 to June 2007.

Since September 2007, Paul Amar presents Revu et corrigé every week on France 5, succeeding to Daniel Schneidermann and Arrêt sur images. In September 2012, after five seasons, Revu et corrigé was replaced by 19 h Paul Amar. The program ended in June 2013.

In January 2016, he became Director of Information at i24News. From Sunday to Friday at 7pm (French time), he hosted the Paris/Jaffa show, live from the Jaffa-Tel Aviv studios. He was dismissed in March 2017.

== Personal life ==
Paul Amar is a cousin of the singer Enrico Macias, their grandfathers were indeed first cousins.

== Bibliography ==
- Paul Amar, Freud à l'Élysée ou les présidentiables dans le divan, Paris, Éditions Le Pré aux Clercs, 1988
- Paul Amar, Scènes de la vie de province, Paris, Éditions Flammarion, January 1992, 191 pages (ISBN 2080663216)
- Paul Amar, Œil de verre, Paris, Éditions Flammarion, collection "Fiction française", November 1994, 231 pages (ISBN 2080669389)
- Paul Amar, Blessures, Paris, Éditions Tallandier, Août 2014, 287 pages (ISBN 9791021006652)
