= Julian Bugier =

French TV journalist

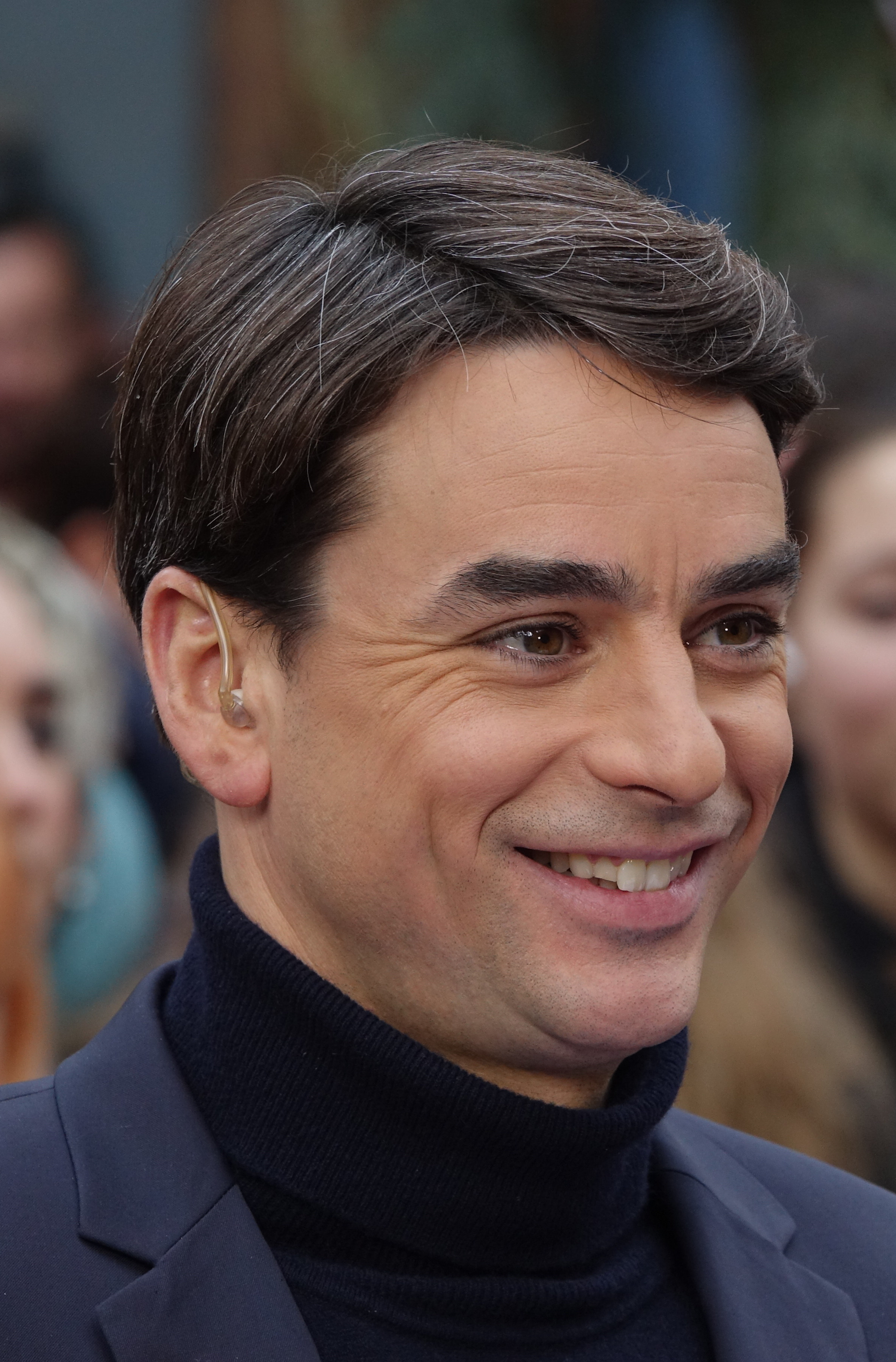
- Born: 22 November 1980 (age 45); Blois, Loir-et-Cher, Centre-Val de Loire, France
- Occupation: Journalist
- Known for: Substitute news presenter on TV channel France 2
- Television: BFM TV (November 2005 - July 2009) i>Télé (August 2009 - July 2011); France 2 (since July 2011)
- Spouse: Claire Fournier
- Children: 2

Julian Bugier (born November 22, 1980, in Blois, Loir-et-Cher), is a French TV journalist.

After working for news channels BFM TV and i Télé; he presented, as a substitute, the 8 o'clock news on weekdays on France 2.

== Family ==
Julian Bugier was born in 1980 in Blois (Loir-et-Cher).

His father Jacques Bugier was a literary man and former journalist. His father worked at La République du Centre then at le Monde from 1991 to 2008. Close to François Bayrou, (he followed Francois' presidential campaign in 2007) and to Jack Lang, he died in June 2013 at the age of 59 years.

Julian Bugier is the elder of two children. He has a sister, Louise.

== Career ==
=== Television ===
Julian pursued a DEUG (Diplôme d'études universitaires générales) in economics without graduating. At 19, he moved to London (UK) and began his journalistic career on the financial and economic station, Bloomberg TV. There he reported for two years and then became a production assistant. He then presented for a year and a half on the French branch of Bloomberg TV.

In November 2005, he participated in the launch of the news channel BFM TV. From May 2006 and the launch of the second version of the channel, he presented the economy journal every evening from Monday to Friday. From late 2008, he served as a substitute presenter of the newspaper chain.

During the summer of 2009, he left BFM news to join the channel of news and current affairs I-Télé. Succeeding Thomas Joubert, he took charge of Info Matin Week-end on Saturday and Sunday from 7:00 am to 11:30 am. At the beginning of September 2010, Jean-Baptiste Boursier replaced him when Julian took charge of a new show (L'info sans interdit) with Sonia Chironi (and with participation from Robert Ménard) from Monday to Friday between 5:00 pm and 7:00 pm, and until 8:00 pm from November 2010 when Audrey Pulvar was suspended from her show Audrey Pulvar Soir.

In July 2011, he rejoined France 2 to become the substitute for Laurent Delahousse on the new shows 13 heures and 20 heures on the weekends. In September 2011, Julian Bugier was appointed joker (parttime replacement) of David Pujadas, for the Vingt Heures weekday news show on France 2. He replaced at this post Marie Drucker who became substitute presenter of the television news of the weekend.

From January to May 2012, in anticipation of the 2012 French presidential election, Julien presented the short program Elysee me Monday to Saturday at 7:55 pm just before the France 2 news. This short news show allowed viewers to see archives of former French presidential elections. (Campaigns, debates, etc.)

In August 2014, he held both the position of substitute for Vingt Heures both weekdays and weekends. He thus made twenty-five straight days of news presentation at France 2

In September 2014, France 2 entrusted him with the presentation of soirées continues (a presentation followed by a debate).

On 27 May 2015, at the entrance to the Pantheon with Pierre Brossolette, Geneviève de Gaulle-Anthonioz, Germaine Tillion and Jean Zay, he presented the special show on France 2 Quatre résistants au Panthéon with consultants at his side Stéphane Bern and Nathalie Saint-Cricq.

Julian Bugier presented, in addition to his work as a part-time substitute, news shows on the weekend between March and July 2015 because of the pregnancy of Marie Drucker.

From 5 September 2015, he presented a weekly consumer magazine show, Tout compte fait on Saturday at 2:40 pm on France 2.

=== On the radio ===
During the summers of 2013 and 2014, he hosted l'économie cette semaine et C'est l'économie demain at 9 am weekends to 10 hours on Europe 1.

== Personal life ==
Married to economic journalist Claire Fournier, he is father of a boy born in April 2011 and a daughter born in 2013.

== Distinction ==
In 2009, the magazine Têtu designated him as

le plus beau mec du PAF (in English: The best looking guy at the TV station)

.

== Filmography ==
- 2011 : Marquis, Film Dominique Farrugia : Himself, presenting a news program on i Télé
- 2012 : Sea to drink, Film Jacques Maillot : Himself, newscaster
- 2012 : This world is crazy, TV movie Baddredine Mokrani : Himself, newscaster
- 2013 : Do not do this, do not do that (series) : Himself, 20-heures news presenter for France 2.
- 2015 : The great divide, film Alexandra Leclère : Himself, 20-heures news presenter for France 2.
- 2017 : L'ascension, film Ludovic Bernard : Himself
