= Évelyne Dhéliat =

French weather presenter and former continuity announcer (born 1948)

- Born: 19 April 1948 (age 77); Cologne, Allied-occupied Germany
- Occupations: Television presenter, continuity announcer
- Years active: 1975–present (television)
- Television: TF1 (1975–present)

Évelyne Dhéliat (born 19 April 1948) is a French weather presenter and former continuity announcer.

== Early life and education ==
Évelyne Dhéliat was born in Cologne. Her father was a commercial director from Bordeaux and her mother a German perfume store owner. An only child, she grew up in the 15th arrondissement of Paris. In 1969, she studied English for one year at the University of Paris III: Sorbonne Nouvelle.

== Television career ==
=== Entertainment programs ===
She began her career in 1969 at the Office de Radiodiffusion Télévision Française as a continuity announcer on the Première chaîne, which was renamed TF1 in January 1975. She started by presenting the program À la bonne heure. In March 1980, on the same channel, she presented the two semi-finals and the final of the French preselection for the Eurovision Song Contest 1980. The band Profil was chosen by the audience. The next month, during the Eurovision Song Contest at The Hague, Netherlands, she introduced, on behalf of the French delegation, the live performance of the band representing France with the song "Hé, hé m'sieurs dames".

She then co-hosted from 1982 to 1988 the program La Maison de TF1, dedicated to household maintenance, gardening and tinkering. They were accompanied by the professionals Michel Galy, Cécile Ibane and Nicolas le Jardinier. She also presented the program Ravis de vous voir until 1988. In November 1985, she received the 7 d'Or for best continuity announcer. She then presented the programs about consumption À vrai dire and C'est bon à savoir until 1991.

=== Weather presenting ===
In 1991, she submitted her demand to present the weather on TF1. After being selected, she was trained on presenting with Alain Gillot-Pétré during the month of August 1992. She began presenting the weather on the channel in September 1992. In 2000, she was named director of the weather service on TF1, and since March 2009, she is the director of the weather service on LCI. In 2011, she was named favorite French weather presenter. In September 2012, Évelyne Dhéliat presents again the weather after several months of absence. In a statement published by TF1, she announced having undergone a surgical operation, which required a long period of rest and treatment.

=== Television roles and contests ===
In June 2013, she appeared in the prime-time Nos chers voisins fêtent l'été on TF1, in which she plays the mother of Alexandre Volange, played by Jean-Baptiste Shelmerdine.

Évelyne Dhéliat has regularly participated at the television contest Le Grand Concours des animateurs. In an episode from September 2013, she went to the final. In January 2014, she participated at the game show Qui veut gagner des millions ? in duet with Gilles Bouleau.

== Personal life ==
Évelyne Dhéliat has a daughter named Olivia, who was born in 1968 and who is a lawyer. She stated in 2013 that she has two grandchildren.
