= Des racines et des ailes =

French television program

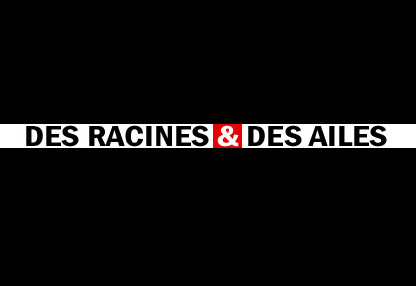
- Genre: Documentary
- Presented by: Carole Gaessler (sept. 2014-); Louis Laforge (2005-2014); Patrick de Carolis (1997-2005)
- Country of origin: France
- Original language: French
- No. of seasons: 15

Production
- Running time: 90 minutes

Original release
- Network: France 3
- Release: November 26, 1997 – present

Des racines et des ailes (meaning "roots and wings") is a French-language television documentary series, created by Patrick de Carolis and Patrick Charles in France in 1997. Des racines et des ailes is broadcast two Wednesdays per month on the France 3 television network and is rebroadcast on TV5. De Carolis hosted the series until he was appointed president of French public service broadcaster France Télévisions in July 2005. Since September 2014, the programme has been hosted by Carole Gaessler.

== Concept ==
Des racines et des ailes is based on the dual concept of "neighbourhood" and "world view"; "neighbourhood", since episodes of Des racines et des ailes are produced in a single city, place or community chosen for its uniqueness, and "world view", since it deals with aspects of the society of France and of other countries.

Since 2001 a number of special editions of Des racines et des ailes have dealt with French or European art cities, museums, an historical location or a period in French or European history. To this end, the series has been able to enlist the cooperation of French heritage associations and the Musées de France.
