= Nagui =

French television and radio personality

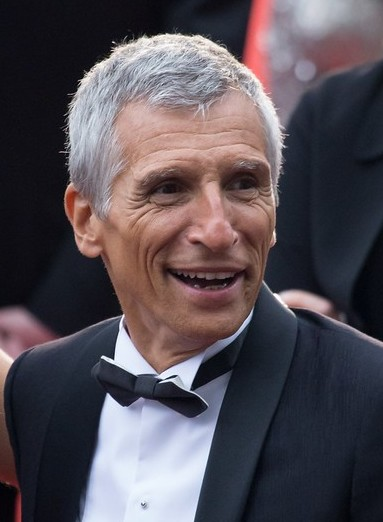
- Nagui at the 2019 Cannes Film Festival
- Born: Nagui Fam
- Occupations: Television host, radio personality

Nagui Fam (French pronunciation: [naɡi fam]; Arabic: ناجي فام), known mononymously as Nagui, is a French television and radio personality.

== Career ==
Fam's television career began in 1987 on M6, and switched to TF1 in 1989. He became well known at the beginning of the 1990s with his game show Que le meilleur gagne (May the Best One Win) on La Cinq, which he carried over to France 2, which he joined in May 1992. His fame has been marked by frenetic humour in the part-parody N'oubliez pas votre brosse à dents (Don't Forget Your Toothbrush) or by a much more laid-back tone in the more serious Que le meilleur gagne.

In 1993, Fam founded his own production house, Air Productions, located at the Plaine Saint-Denis, and created a benchmark music show Taratata where artists perform "live".

In 1999, Fam attempted to take on the job of succeeding Philippe Gildas and Antoine de Caunes on the Canal+ show, Nulle part ailleurs (Nowhere Else), a role that had already defeated Guillaume Durand.

In 2001, Fam returned to France 2 to present a game show, Le Numéro Gagnant (Winning Lines), Le Coffre (The Vault) in 2003, then the revival of Intervilles (Intercity) during summer 2004.

As of 2006, Fam is the host of a daily game show called Tout le monde veut prendre sa place, French for "Everybody wants to take his/her place" (the place being that of the current champion on the show), on France 2. The game concept has been bought by Michael Davies, the Power of 10 producer.

In addition, since December 2007, Fam hosts a daily musical game show in prime time: N'oubliez pas les paroles!, which is the French version of Don't Forget the Lyrics!

On radio, after co-hosting from 07:00 to 10:00 the morning show on Europe 2 (which later became Virgin Radio) with Manu from September 2006 to June 2008, Fam is hosting on Europe 1 a show called Décrochez le Soleil from 09:30 to 11:00. ( Give yourself ...the Sun ). Currently, he is hosting "La Bande Originale" (The original Sound-track) on France Inter.

In April 2010, a national survey carried out by strategies.fr placed Fam as the nation no.1 TV host, which was confirmed by his ratings. He is fluent in English as well as French.

== Filmography ==
- Babel (1999)
- My Wife Is an Actress (2001)
