= Vire, Dahanu =

Village in Maharashtra

Vire
- village
- Location in Maharashtra, India Vire (India)
- Coordinates: 19.8615397°N 72.773255°E
- Country: India
- State: Maharashtra
- District: Palghar
- Taluka: Dahanu
- Elevation: 8 m (26 ft)

Population (2011)
  - Total: 488
- Time zone: UTC+5:30 (IST)
- 2011 census code: 551741

Vire is a village in the Palghar district of Maharashtra, India. It is located in the Dahanu taluka.

== Demographics ==
According to the 2011 census of India, Vire has 100 households. The effective literacy rate (i.e. the literacy rate of population excluding children aged 6 and below) is 66.25%.

Demographics (2011 Census)
	Total	Male	Female
Population	488	271	217
Children aged below 6 years	91	49	42
Scheduled caste	0	0	0
Scheduled tribe	485	268	217
Literates	263	176	87
Workers (all)	291	154	137
Main workers (total)	270	144	126
Main workers: Cultivators	4	3	1
Main workers: Agricultural labourers	256	133	123
Main workers: Household industry workers	0	0	0
Main workers: Other	10	8	2
Marginal workers (total)	21	10	11
Marginal workers: Cultivators	2	1	1
Marginal workers: Agricultural labourers	9	4	5
Marginal workers: Household industry workers	0	0	0
Marginal workers: Others	10	5	5
Non-workers	197	117	80
