= Nathalie Marquay =

French beauty pageant contestant

Nathalie Marquay (born 17 March 1967 in Comines, Nord) is a French actress, model and beauty pageant titleholder who was crowned Miss France 1987 and represented her country at Miss Universe 1987, Miss World 1987, Miss Europe 1988 and Miss International 1988 competitions.

Preceded by Valérie Pascale	Miss France; 1987	Succeeded by Sylvie Bertin
