= Le Disney Channel =

Television series

- Network: FR3
- Launched: 26 January 1985; 41 years ago
- Closed: 31 December 1988; 37 years ago
- Country of origin: France
- Format: Defunct children's block
- Running time: 120 minutes
- Original language: French

Le Disney Channel was a French programming block on FR3 (now France 3, the second largest French public television channel and part of the France Télévisions group) from January 26, 1985, until December 31, 1988. The block's runtime was 8:35pm–10:00pm (UTC+1) on Saturday nights. On January 7, 1989, it was replaced with a cartoon-based block named Samdynamite. Yet the show reached good ratings on FR3, but Disney wanted to impose its programs on FR3, FR3 refused to renew its contract and the latter was terminated. Disney would later sign a contract with TF1 (which by coïncidence, the network which terminated Disney's contract, FR3, was to be privatized into a private body, however the final decision was that of TF1).

== Programmes shown on Disney Channel FR3 ==
- Adventures of the Gummi Bears
- Disney Family Album
- Donald Duck Presents
- D-TV
- DuckTales
- Five Mile Creek
- Good Morning, Mickey!
- Sidekicks
- The Scarecrow of Romney Marsh
- Welcome to Pooh Corner
- Zorro

In addition to Good Morning, Mickey!, classic cartoons were also shown in a short block entitled "Festival de Dessins Animes". Clips from feature-length productions had the spotlight on "La Minute Disney".
