= Élizabeth Tchoungui =

Franco-Cameroonian writer and journalist (born 1974)

Elizabeth Tchoungui
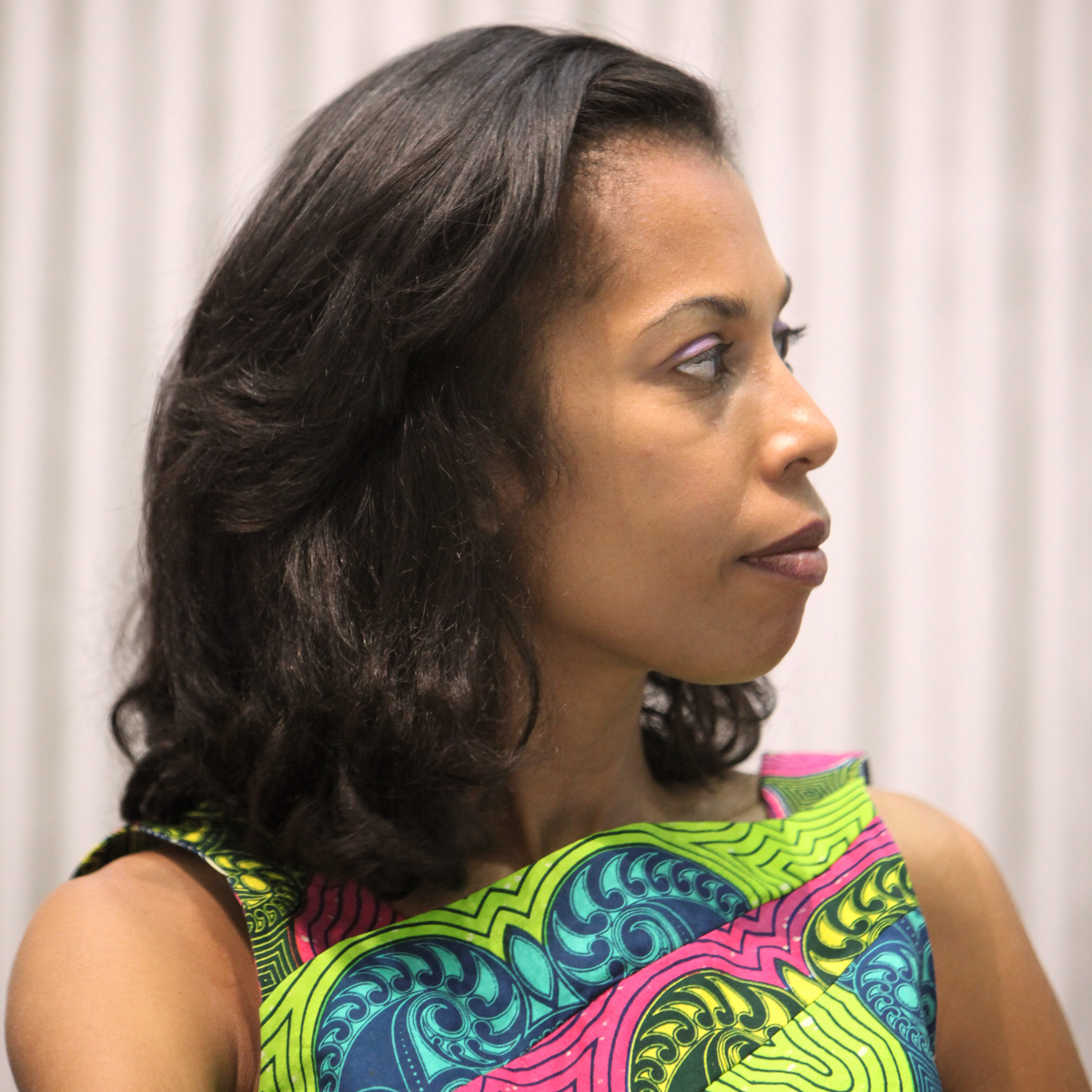
- Elizabeth Tchoungui in 2011.
- Born: 6 February 1974 (age 52); Washington, D.C., United States
- Occupations: Writer; journalist; television presenter; documentarian

Elizabeth Tchoungui (born 6 February 1974) is a Franco-Cameroonian woman of letters, journalist, and television presenter.

== Early life and education ==
Elizabeth Tchoungui was born on 6 February 1974 in Washington D.C, United States. She is the daughter of Ambassador François-Xavier Tchoungui, the first Secretary General of the Cameroonian Ministry of foreign affairs, and a French mother. She grew up in the United States, Cameroon, Belgium, and Italy, following her diplomat father's postings. She later pursued her secondary and higher education in France, at the École supérieure de journalisme de Lille, before embarking on a career in journalism and television presenting.

== Professional career ==
=== Television ===
First television experience at the Cameroon Radio and Television (CRTV). 1997–1999: she hosted the program JTJ des enfants on the channel Canal J. 2000: Les Écrans du savoir on France 5. 2002: Ubik on France 5. 2003: 24, ça me dit on TV5. 2007: Afrik'Art on Voyage. 2007: she created the cultural service of France 24 at the launch of the channel. Editor-in-chief of JT de la Culture on France 24, she hosted a special program for the 20th of the Festival panafricain du cinéma de Ouagadougou (Fespaco) in February, attended by over 20,000 spectators. 2007: Avant-premières on France 2. 2009: Les Maternelles on France 5. 2011: Avant-premières on France 2. 2012: Ô Féminin on France Ô. 2013: Sur Écoute on France Culture. 2013: Mémô on France Ô. 2017: Indices on RMC Story

=== Communication and culture ===
In 2007, Tchoungui was nominated member of the Images de la diversité commission of the National Center for Cinema and the Moving Image, as a qualified personality chosen on the proposal of the Ministry of Culture. In 2020, she was appointed executive director of CSR at Orange by Stéphane Richard.

== Awards ==
2009: Knight of the Order of Arts and Letters

2023: Knight of the National Order of Merit

== Personal life ==
Tchoungui is the mother of two children.

== Publications ==
- 2007: Je vous souhaite la pluie, Pocket, 226 p. ISBN 2-259-20291-8
