= François de Closets =

French journalist and television presenter

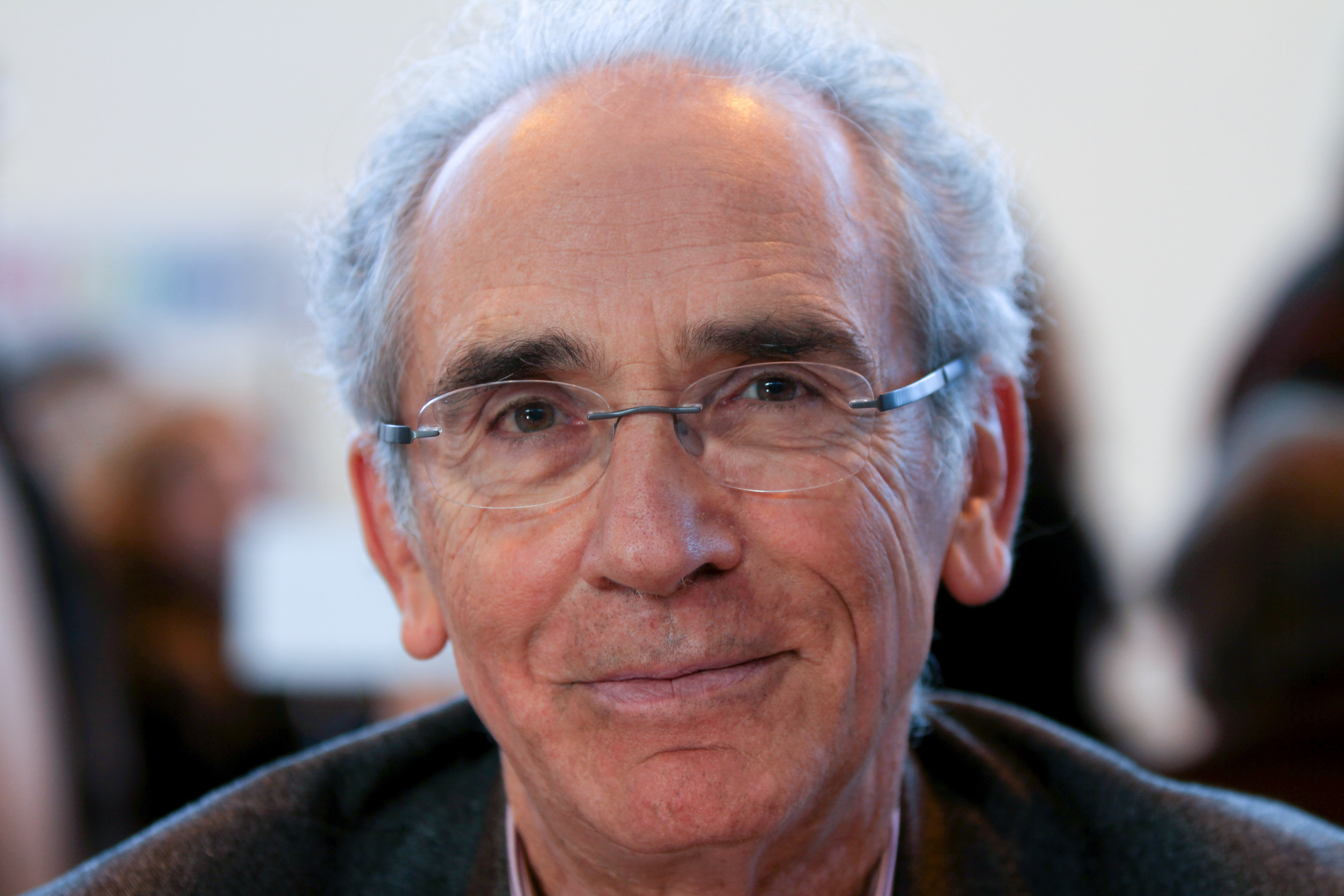
- Born: 25 December 1933 (age 92); Enghien-les-Bains, France
- Education: Sciences Po
- Occupations: Television presenter journalist
- Employer(s): France Télévisions; BFM TV

François de Closets (born 25 December 1933) is a French journalist and television presenter.
