= Vire =

Commune in Calvados, France

Vire, Normandie
- Part of Vire Normandie
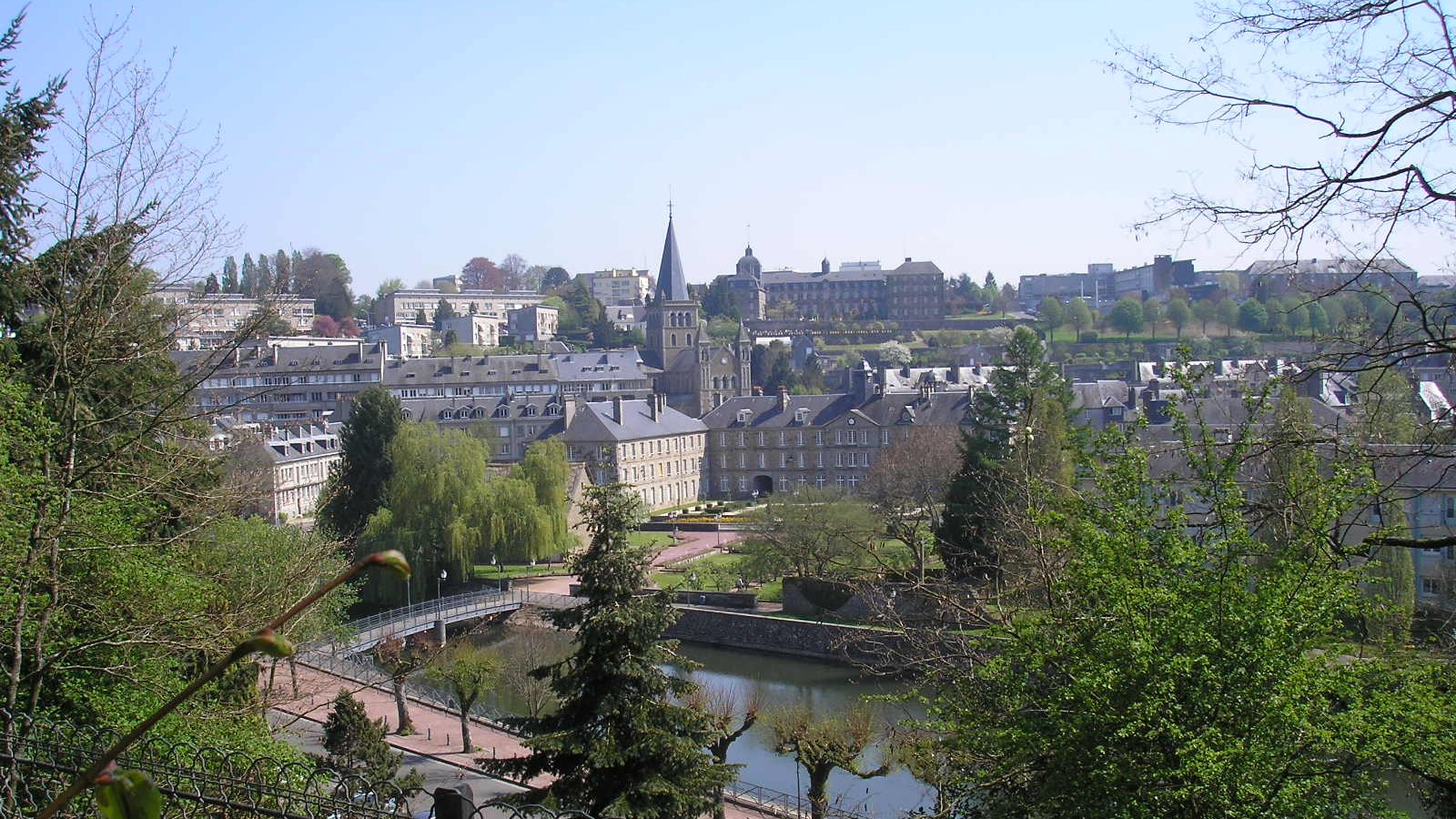
- Vire from the Place du Château

- Coat of arms
- Location of Vire, Normandie
- Location within France Location within Normandy
- Coordinates: 48°50′N 0°53′W
- Country: France
- Region: Normandy
- Department: Calvados
- Arrondissement: Vire
- Canton: Vire Normandie
- Commune: Vire Normandie
- Area^{1}: 22.50 km^{2} (8.69 sq mi)
- Elevation: 134 m (440 ft)
- Highest elevation: 225 m (738 ft)
- Lowest elevation: 85 m (279 ft)
- Population (2022): 10,906
  - Density: 484.7/km^{2} (1,255/sq mi)
- Time zone: UTC+01:00 (CET)
  - Summer (DST): UTC+02:00 (CEST)
- Postal code: 14500
- ^{1} French Land Register data, which excludes lakes, ponds, glaciers > 1 km^{2} (0.386 sq mi or 247 acres) and river estuaries.

Vire (French pronunciation: [viʁ]) is a town and a former commune in the Calvados department in the Normandy region in northwestern France. On 1 January 2016, it was merged into the new commune of Vire Normandie.

== Geography ==
The town is located on the river Vire. Much of its surroundings consist of the bocage virois, a type of mixed woodland and pasture common in Normandy.

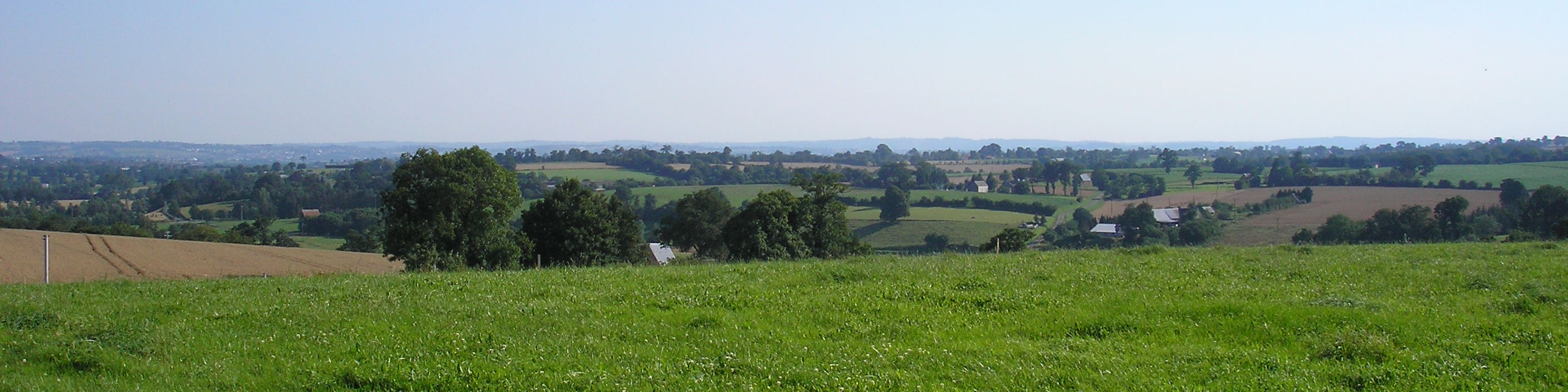
The "bocage virois"

== History ==
In 1123, King of England and Duke of Normandy Henry I had a redoubt constructed on a rocky hill top, which was surrounded by the Vire river. The redoubt was stoned square at the bottom to assure the defense of the Duchy of Normandy against any attacks from Brittany or Maine.

At the beginning of the 13th century, King Louis IX of France ordered that the existing stonework be supplemented with exterior ramparts. However the second precinct was finished only in the early the 14th century.

At the end of the Middle Ages, the village prospered first with leather and then with textiles During the Hundred Years' War, Vire was plundered in 1368 by large military companies, and delivered to the English in 1418. The English occupation would end in 1450, with many considering it a time of brutality and oppression. Notably, the execution of Hugues Vaux, owner of the largest farm of the village, after refusing to give up his farm to the English sergeant Fields, caused much grief among the population. Some inhabitants nevertheless benefited from the English occupation. Eugène Vergny, who provided Fields with information about the movement of the French troops, received the property of Vaux after his execution.

During the reign of Louis XIII, because a number of Fortifications of the Middle Ages served in rebellions by the Huguenots in particular, the castle and its precinct were dismantled on orders of Cardinal Richelieu.

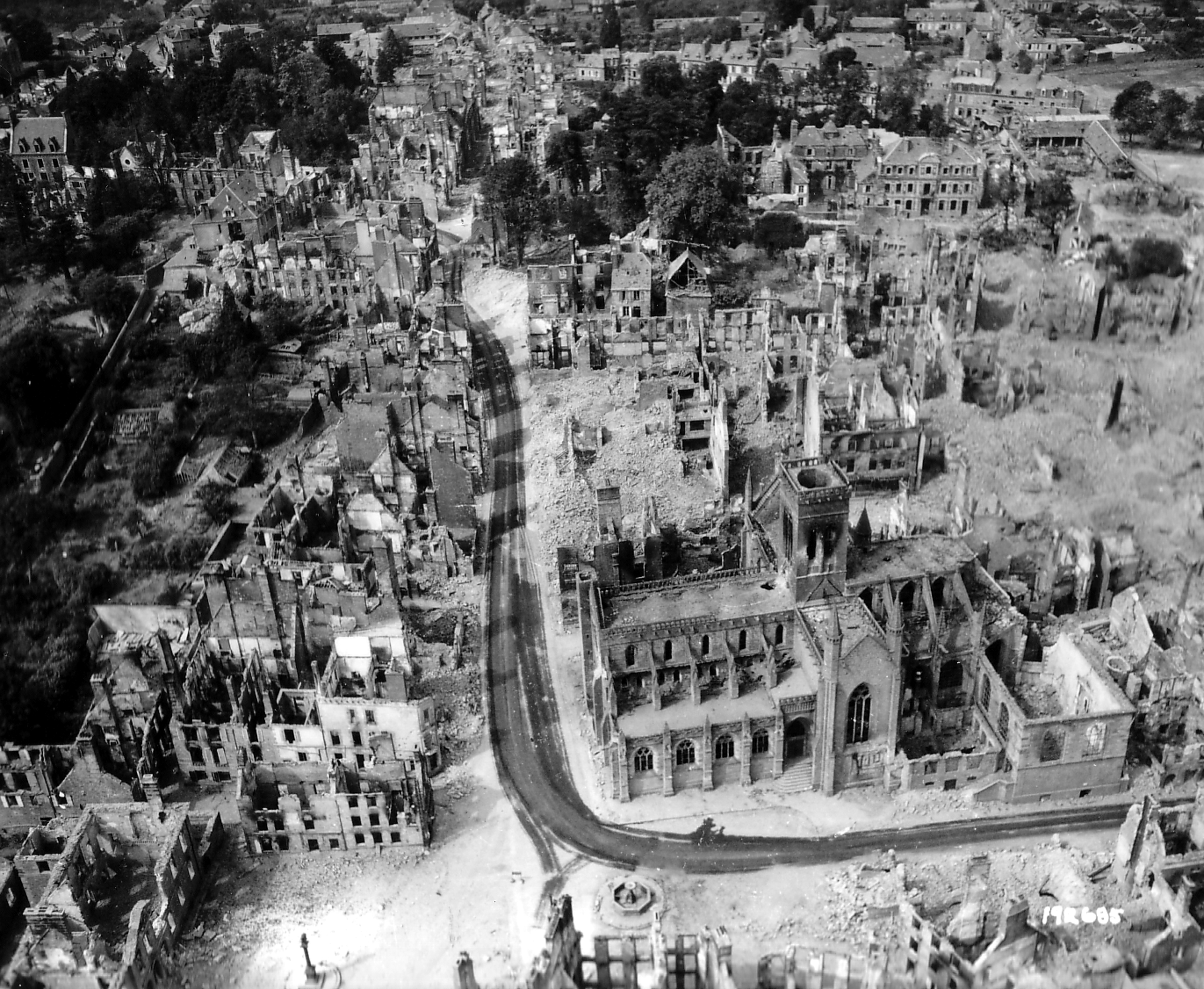
Aerial view after the bombardment in 1944

During the 19th century, the village did not respond well to the Industrial Revolution and went into an important recession.

The castle of Tracy, the manor of 19th-century the French historian Arcisse de Caumont, can be found just north of Vire in the old community of Neuville.

Like many other Norman cities and villages, Vire suffered heavily from British bombings on June 6, 1944, or D-Day, during the Second World War. 95% of the town was destroyed. One of the two target-marking flare groups was out of alignment and much of the bombing fell across the town of Vire. The Master Bomber in charge of the operation identified the problem and issued corrections to the incoming aircraft. Much of the bombing from the first wave of aircraft fell across the town of Vire killing many of the inhabitants. It was a distressing night for many families. After two days of heavy fighting, with 108 soldiers killed and four missing, the town was liberated on 8 August 1944 by the 1st battalion, 116th Infantry Regiment of the 29th Infantry Division.

The reconstruction of Vire began in the 1960s.

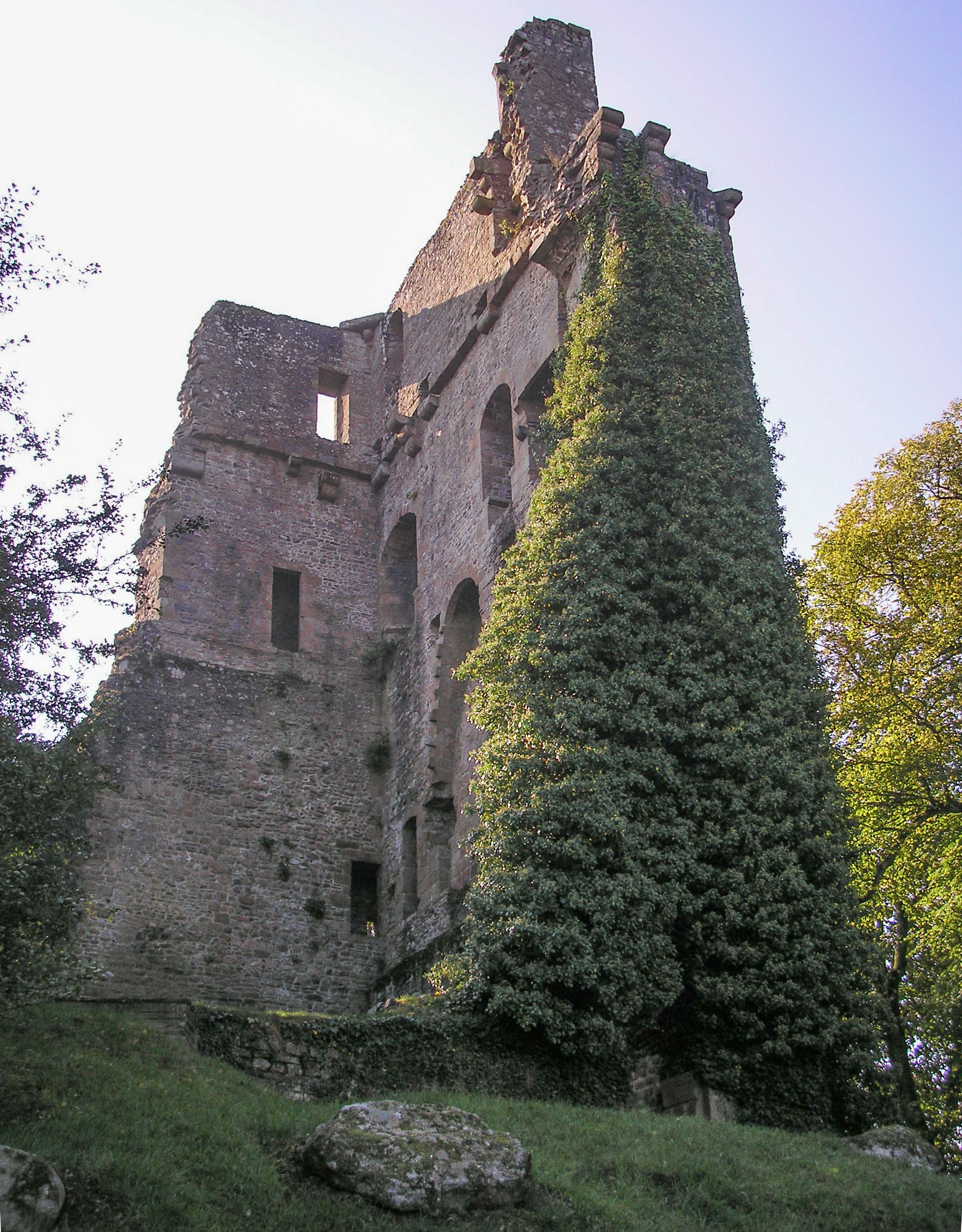
Donjon de Vire, ruins of the 11th century castle

== Population ==
Historical population

Year	Pop.	±% p.a.
1793	7,873	—
1800	7,700	−0.32%
1806	8,183	+1.02%
1821	8,381	+0.16%
1831	8,043	−0.41%
1836	7,339	−1.82%
1841	7,375	+0.10%
1846	7,658	+0.76%
1851	7,266	−1.05%
1856	7,036	−0.64%
1861	7,647	+1.68%
1866	6,863	−2.14%
1872	6,778	−0.21%
1876	6,718	−0.22%
1881	6,597	−0.36%
1886	6,736	+0.42%
1891	6,635	−0.30%
1896	6,600	−0.11%
1901	6,517	−0.25%

Year	Pop.	±% p.a.
1906	6,353	−0.51%
1911	6,298	−0.17%
1921	5,949	−0.57%
1926	5,871	−0.26%
1931	5,766	−0.36%
1936	5,917	+0.52%
1946	3,929	−4.01%
1954	7,963	+9.23%
1962	9,518	+2.25%
1968	11,140	+2.66%
1975	13,399	+2.67%
1982	13,709	+0.33%
1990	12,895	−0.76%
1999	12,805	−0.08%
2007	12,385	−0.42%
2012	11,562	−1.37%
2017	11,091	−0.83%
2022	10,906	−0.34%

Source: EHESS/Cassini until 1999, INSEE from 2007

== Administration ==
In 1953 Vire was merged with the former commune of Neuville and in 1972 with the former commune of Saint-Martin-de-Tallevende. Since January 2016 it has been a delegated commune within the commune of Vire Normandie. Vire is part of the canton of Vire Normandie.

== Transport ==
Vire has a large railway station (Gare de Vire) which has frequent services to Paris and Granville. The nearest airport is Caen – Carpiquet Airport in Caen (40 min drive).

Vire is connected to Saint-Lô and Cherbourg-en-Cotentin via RN 174 and to Caen via RD 577 and A84. Vire is also connected to Granville, Villedieu-les-Poêles, Flers, Argentan, Dreux and Paris via RD 924.

== Gastronomy ==
- Andouille, a speciality of Vire.

== International relations ==
Vire is twinned with:

Totnes, South Devon, United Kingdom since 1972; Santa Fe, Spain since 1987; Baunatal, Germany since 1983	Atlacomulco, Mexico; Săcele, Romania since 2001; Franceville, Gabon

== Sport ==
AF Virois is the local football team based at the stade Pierre-Compte.

== Personalities ==
- Olivier Basselin (c. 1400 – c. 1450, poet.
- Charles-Julien Lioult de Chênedollé (1769–1833), poet
- Jean-Baptiste du Hamel (1624–1706), physicist
- Henry I of England (c. 1068–1135)
- Raymond Lefebvre (1891–1920), writer
- Francis Letellier (born 1964), journalist
- Thomas Pichon (1700–1781), government agent and traitor
- Michel Drucker (born 1942), journalist and TV host.

== Climate ==
Climate data for Vire (2003–2020 normals, extremes 2003–present)
Month	Jan	Feb	Mar	Apr	May	Jun	Jul	Aug	Sep	Oct	Nov	Dec	Year
Record high °C (°F)	17.2 (63.0)	21.9 (71.4)	24.4 (75.9)	28.0 (82.4)	30.5 (86.9)	37.0 (98.6)	39.3 (102.7)	37.2 (99.0)	32.7 (90.9)	28.7 (83.7)	22.7 (72.9)	17.7 (63.9)	39.3 (102.7)
Mean daily maximum °C (°F)	8.5 (47.3)	9.0 (48.2)	11.7 (53.1)	15.6 (60.1)	18.2 (64.8)	21.4 (70.5)	23.5 (74.3)	22.8 (73.0)	20.8 (69.4)	16.6 (61.9)	12.0 (53.6)	9.1 (48.4)	15.8 (60.4)
Daily mean °C (°F)	5.6 (42.1)	5.6 (42.1)	7.4 (45.3)	10.1 (50.2)	13.0 (55.4)	16.2 (61.2)	18.0 (64.4)	17.5 (63.5)	15.3 (59.5)	12.6 (54.7)	8.7 (47.7)	6.0 (42.8)	11.3 (52.3)
Mean daily minimum °C (°F)	2.7 (36.9)	2.2 (36.0)	3.0 (37.4)	4.6 (40.3)	7.8 (46.0)	11.0 (51.8)	12.5 (54.5)	12.1 (53.8)	9.7 (49.5)	8.6 (47.5)	5.4 (41.7)	2.9 (37.2)	6.9 (44.4)
Record low °C (°F)	−11.1 (12.0)	−10.3 (13.5)	−12.1 (10.2)	−5.1 (22.8)	−2.4 (27.7)	1.4 (34.5)	3.5 (38.3)	3.4 (38.1)	−0.1 (31.8)	−2.7 (27.1)	−7.7 (18.1)	−16.6 (2.1)	−16.6 (2.1)
Average precipitation mm (inches)	101.2 (3.98)	78.6 (3.09)	70.6 (2.78)	58.4 (2.30)	67.2 (2.65)	58.0 (2.28)	61.7 (2.43)	71.1 (2.80)	51.8 (2.04)	95.1 (3.74)	101.1 (3.98)	116.6 (4.59)	931.4 (36.67)
Average precipitation days (≥ 1.0 mm)	15.2	12.5	11.5	9.7	10.7	8.9	9.5	10.5	8.1	12.8	14.2	15.2	138.9
Source: Meteociel

== See also ==
- Communes of the Calvados department
