= Marie Drucker =

French journalist and presenter

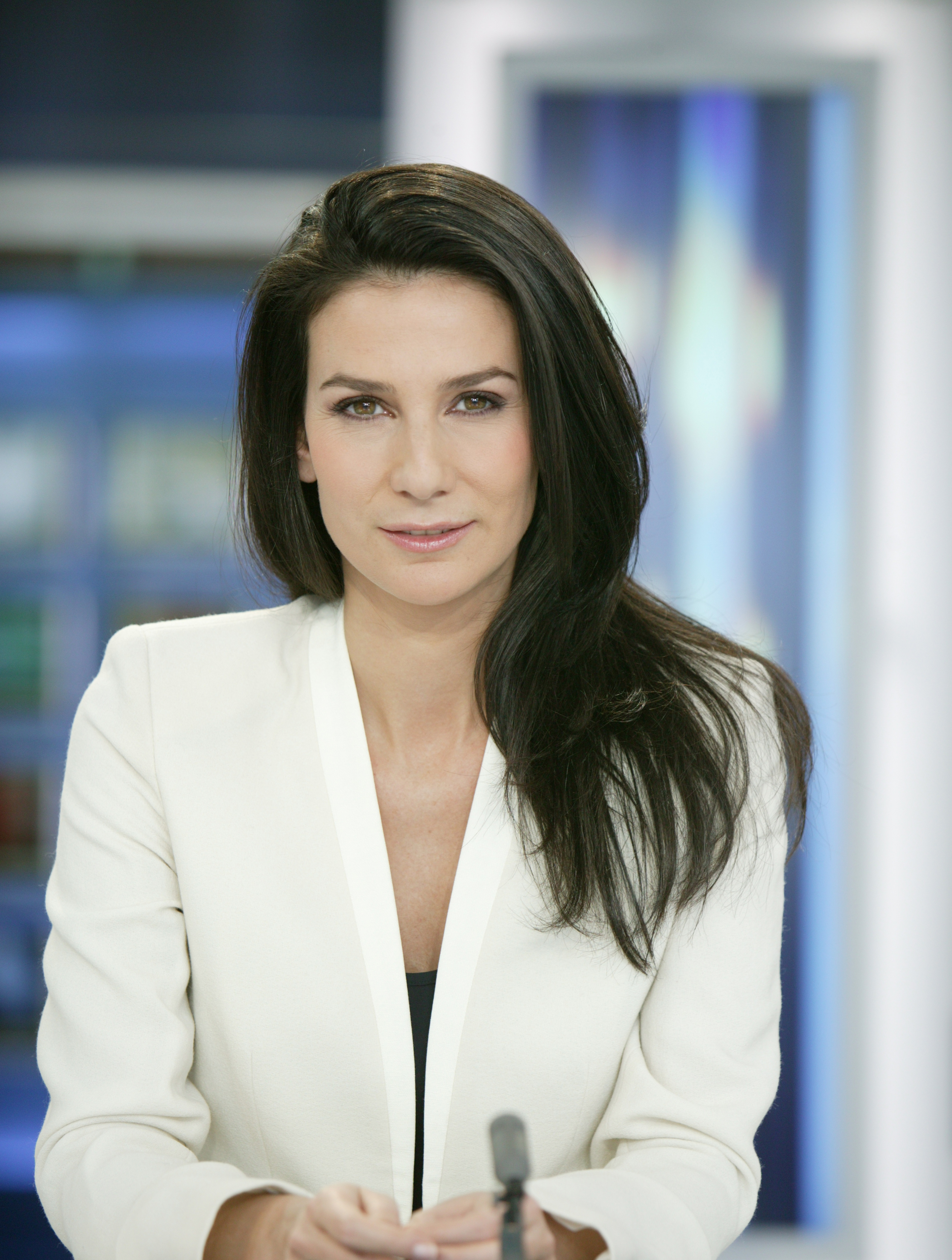
- Drucker as anchor of the 20 Heures news
- Born: 3 December 1974 (age 51); Paris, France
- Education: Sorbonne
- Occupations: Journalist on TV and radio
- Partner: Gad Elmaleh (2009–2010)
- Parent: Jean Drucker
- Relatives: Michel Drucker (paternal uncle); Léa Drucker (paternal cousin)

Marie Drucker (born 3 December 1974) is a French journalist, author, television and radio personality.

== Early life ==
The daughter of Jean Drucker, a French television executive, and a niece of Michel Drucker, a television journalist, she was educated at the Sorbonne, where she received a degree in modern literature. Her family is Jewish (from Romania, Austria, Poland, and Algeria).

== Career ==
Her journalistic career started in 1994, as a freelance reporter for such magazines as Le Figaro and ELLE, before she settled down with the Capa agency in 1997, working with them on the TV programme Qu'en pensez-vous? ('What Do You Think of It?') on the Canal+ channel. She was the co-presenter of the France 2 show Rince ta baignoire in 1999. Next, in August 1999, she joined the newly formed team of I-Télé, a 24-hour news channel which first went on the air in November 1999, with whom she stayed until September 2003. The following two years she worked for Canal+, the main station of the Canal+ Group. The Canal+ Group is the parent company of I-Télé. She then moved across to become the main news-reader on the France 3 evening news show Soir 3. At the end of August 2008 Drucker left Soir 3 to take up a new position as substitute anchor of the weekend news bulletins of the France 2 channel.

In 2017, she became the presenter and producer of the documentary program Infrarouge. Prior to this, there was no person presenting the program. She had stopped presenting news in mid-2016, instead focusing on documentary production, founding a production company later that year.

== Personal life ==
Despite a desire to protect her privacy, Drucker has been in a number of well publicized relationships with high-profile individuals, several of whom she was engaged to, starting with novelist Marc Levy until 2005. Then starting in late spring 2006 she was the partner of former French Minister of the Interior François Baroin, which led her to resign from Soir 3 out of concerns regarding her objectivity, but the couple were reported to have separated in April 2008.

In 2009 she had an affair with banker Matthieu Pigasse, which became the subject of a scathing book by Pigasse's scorned wife, Alix Étournaud, in which Drucker is never named but instead referred to by nicknames such as "la sorcière" (the witch), "Miss Météo" (weather girl) or "gorge profonde" (deep throat). She shortly thereafter entered a relationship with comic actor Gad Elmaleh which lasted about a year. In 2012, she was reported to be dating celebrity chef Cyril Lignac.

Drucker lived in the 8th arrondissement of Paris with her then-partner, Mathias Vicherat, with whom she was in a relationship from 2014 until 2021. On the night of 31 March to 1 April 2015, Drucker gave birth to their son, named Jean after her father.
