= Francis Letellier =

French journalist (born 1964)

- Born: 19 December 1964 (age 61); Vire, Calvados, France
- Occupation: Journalist
- Employer: France 3

Francis Letellier (born 19 December 1964) is a French journalist who works on France 3.

== Early life ==
Letellier was born in Vire in Calvados. Letellier spent his childhood in Pont-Farcy, where his parents were farmers.

== Personal life ==
Letellier is gay and married.

== Honours ==
- Ordre des Arts et des Lettres
