= Michel Drucker =

French journalist (born 1942)

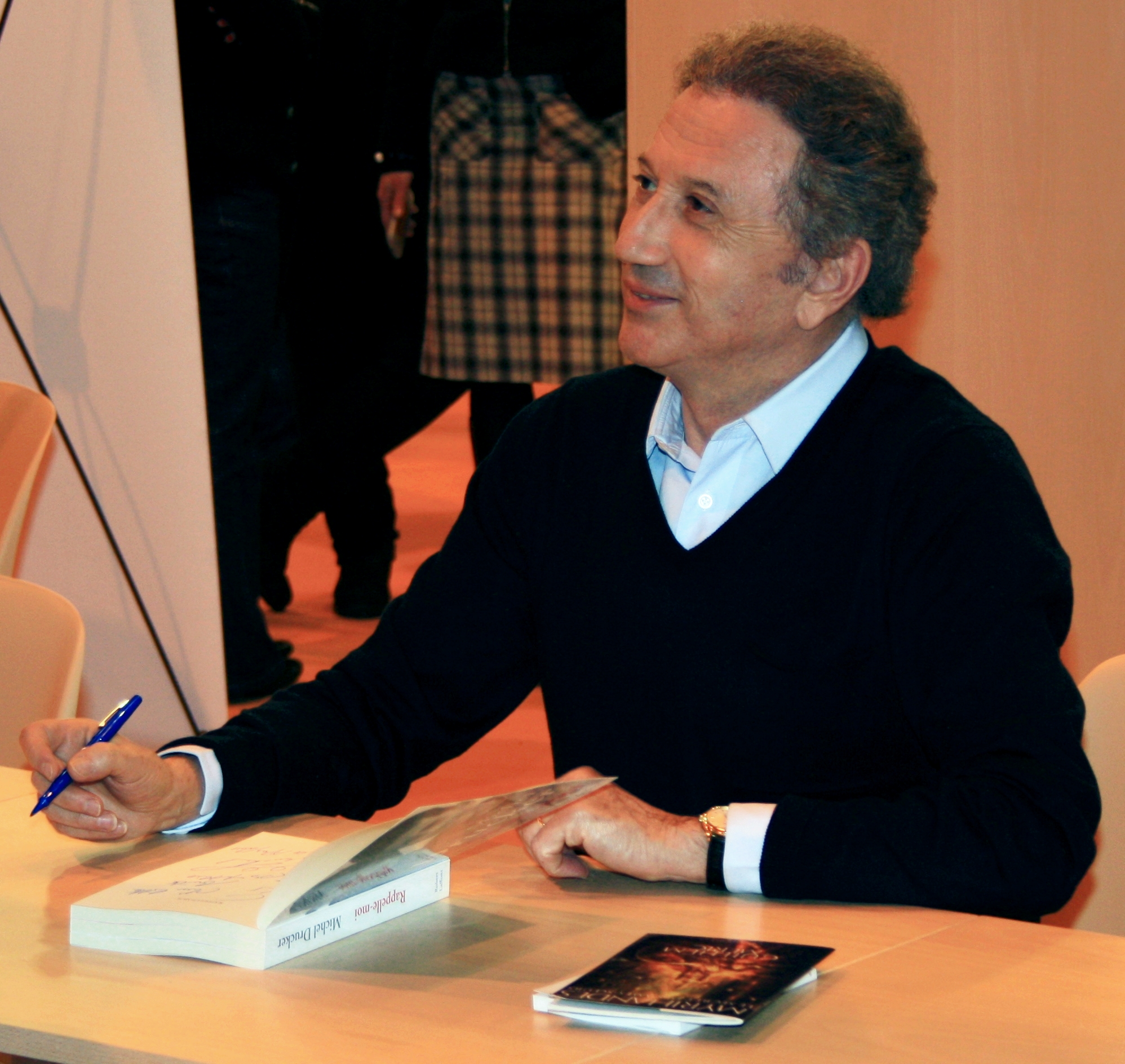
- Drucker in 2011
- Born: 12 September 1942 (age 84); Vire, France
- Occupations: Television and radio host
- Employer(s): France 2, Europe 1
- Spouse: Dany Saval
- Relatives: Jean Drucker (brother); Marie Drucker (niece); Léa Drucker (niece)

Michel Drucker, CQ (born 12 September 1942) is a French journalist and TV host. He has been on screen for so long on various shows and different networks, both public and private, that he once said that some people joked that he was included in the price of their TV sets.

== Career ==
Drucker was born in Vire. He started a journalistic career in 1965 at the ORTF as sports reporter and commentator. Although he kept doing live coverage of major association football matches until 1986, he soon turned to hosting variety shows, such as Champs-Élysées on Antenne 2 in the 1980s, then Stars 90 on TF1 in the 1990s, then finally Vivement dimanche on France 2 every Sunday afternoon since 1998.

Drucker is known for his polite, toned-down attitude towards show-business stars, and is best known outside France for the incident between Serge Gainsbourg and American singer Whitney Houston on the television programme, Champs-Élysées.

== Personal life ==
Drucker is Jewish. His father, Abraham Drucker, was a Jewish immigrant who arrived in France in 1925 to study medicine. Drucker's younger brother, Jacques, is a doctor, and his older brother, Jean, was a television executive.

Drucker is married to French actress Dany Saval and is an uncle of Léa Drucker, an actress, and Marie Drucker, a telejournalist on France 2.

== Filmography ==
Year	Title	Role	Director	Notes
2005	Un fil à la patte	The florist	Francis Perrin	TV movie
2006	Trois jeunes filles nues		Richard Valverde	TV movie
2007	Trois contes merveilleux	The priest	Hélène Guétary	TV movie
2012	Stars 80	Himself	Frédéric Forestier & Thomas Langmann	
2013	Y'a pas d'âge	Michel Jocker	July Hygreck	TV series (1 episode)
2013	Platane	Himself	Éric Judor & Denis Imbert	TV series (1 episode)
2013	La grande boucle (fr)	Himself	Laurent Tuel	
2014	Number One Fan	Himself	Jeanne Herry	
2014	Avis de mistral	Himself	Rose Bosch	
2015	L'Hôtel du Libre-Echange	Monsieur	François Goetghebeur	TV movie
2016	Arrête ton cinéma	Himself	Diane Kurys	
2016	Un chapeau de paille d'Italie	The client	François Goetghebeur (2)	TV movie
2017	Coexister	Himself	Fabrice Eboué	
2017	Call My Agent !	Himself	Laurent Tirard	TV series (1 episode)
2018	Guy	Himself	Alex Lutz	

== Honours ==
=== National honours ===
- France:
  - Officer of the National Order of the Legion of Honour (1994)
  - Knight of the Ordre des Arts et des Lettres (1984)

=== Foreign honours ===
- Canada:
  - Quebec: Knight (2001), now Officer (2010) of the National Order of Quebec
