= Gérard Holtz =

French sports journalist (born 1946)

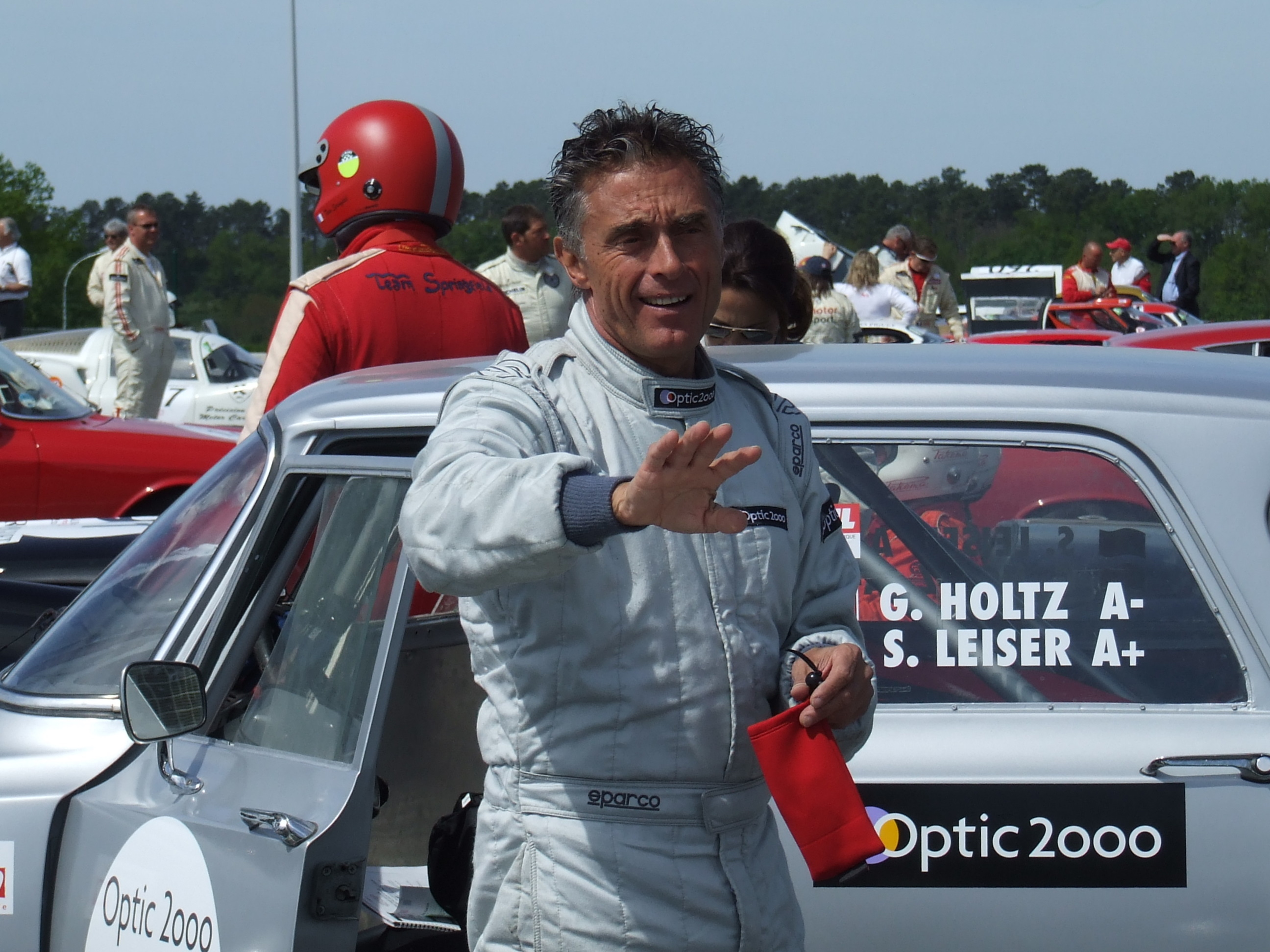
- Gérard Holtz in 2011
- Born: 8 December 1946 (age 79); Paris, France
- Education: French Press Institute; Centre de formation des journalistes
- Occupation: Sports journalist
- Years active: 1972–present
- Spouse(s): Marie-Françoise Buart (1979-2006); Muriel Mayette (2013-present)
- Children: 2

Gérard Holtz (born 8 December 1946) is a French sports journalist.

== Early life and education ==
Gérard Holtz was born in Paris and grew up in the area of Belleville. At the age of eight, he nearly died from an accident and contracted tuberculosis. He was sent until the age of ten in a sanitorium in the department of Corrèze to be treated. The doctor diagnosed that he will stay with rachitis and will never be able to do sports again. Holtz will later determine that he will do anything else in life to show the contrary.

Holtz graduated with a DESS of public law and later studied at the French Press Institute before graduating at the Centre de formation des journalistes (CFJ) of Paris in 1972.

== Television career ==
Holtz attempted the contest for Europe 1 but was not received. Claire Richet, director of the CFJ, let him join the ORTF in 1972 where he is a reporter for the news for 10 years. From 1976 to 1982, he hosted the daily news before becoming a well-known reporter for the sports on Antenne 2 in 1982.

From 1985 to 1992, he presents Stade 2 where he comments the sport and is well known for his interviews after the race of the Tour de France since 1985 and the comments of the Dakar Rally since 1994. He retired from covering the Tour de France after the 2016 edition, and during post-race interviews after stage 20 in Morzine race leader Chris Froome presented Holtz with an autographed yellow jersey as a gift.

In 1999, he hosts Les cinglés de la télé on France 2, a game show based on television culture. He also co-hosts the Téléthon with Claude Sérillon and Sophie Davant in 1991, 1998, 2002 and 2003. He hosted the Journal de 13 heures on France 2 between September 2000 and July 2001 but also some of them in the evening.

From 2005 to 2008, he hosted again Stade 2 on Sundays on France 2, and right after the 2008 Summer Olympics. During the Tour de France, he hosts the Avant Tour since 2007 and the Après Tour since 2008 on France 2. He also hosts the 2012 Summer Olympics on France Télévisions.

== Personal life ==
Gérard Holtz married Marie-Françoise Buart from 1979 to 2006, with whom he has two sons, Julien (born in 1979) and Antoine (born in 1987). He married again on 19 April 2013 Muriel Mayette, the administrator of the Comédie Française.

== Honours ==
Gérard Holtz was named Knight of the National Order of Merit by Nicolas Sarkozy on November 23, 2010.
