= Santé Vie =

- Type: Privately-owned specialist channel
- Country: France

Programming
- Language: French

Ownership
- Owner: Jean-François Lemoine; Lagardère News (2000-2002); Marcel Ichou (2002-2003)

History
- Launched: May 31, 2000
- Closed: September 1, 2003

Santé Vie was a specialist French television channel dedicated to health, launched on May 31, 2000, and ceased operations on December 1, 2003.

== History ==
The channel was founded in 2000 by Jean-François Lemoine and was authorized on May 31, 2000, by the CSA. It was a channel broadcast on the Canal+ bundle and several cable networks, divided into two distinct time slots:

- 9 AM to 11 PM for the general public;
- 11 PM to 1 AM, reserved for health professionals.

Initially part of the Lagardère Active group (owning 81.4% of the capital), Santé Vie was chaired by Jérôme Bellay, with an estimated annual budget of 4.5 million euros. However, the channel's near-zero ratings led Lagardère to sell its shares in July 2002. Marcel Ichou, a doctor heading a group of healthcare professionals, then took over the channel's management and quickly brought in Patrick Chêne to turn it around. New programs were launched, including collaborations with Claude Sérillon, and there was even a project to change the name of the channel. Nonetheless, Santé Vie ceased broadcasting as of September 1, 2003.

== Organisation ==
=== Executives ===
Chairman & Chief Executive Officers:

- Jérôme Bellay: from May 31, 2000, to July 2002;
- Marcel Ichou: from July 2002 to September 1, 2003.

=== Finances ===
Santé Vie had an estimated annual budget of 4.5 million euros and was 81.4% owned by the Lagardère Active group. In July 2002, the channel was acquired by a group of healthcare professionals led by Marcel Ichou.

=== Presenters ===
- Edwige Antier
- Patrick Chêne
- Fabienne Kraemer
- Brigitte Milhau
- Jacques Pradel
- Claude Sérillon
- Brigitte Simonetta
- Gérard Vivès
- Edith Simonnet
- Caroline Thompson
- Caroline Dublanche
- Karen Cheryl

== Shows ==
- Femmes Enfants: Hosted by Jacques Pradel, Edwige Antier, and Brigitte Simonetta.
- C'est mon poids: Inspired by the reality TV show Big Diet, hosted by Fabienne Kraemer.
- Associations de Bienfaiteurs: Hosted by Patrick Chêne.
- Bistouri et Compagnie: Hosted by Claude Sérillon.
