= Christmas in France =

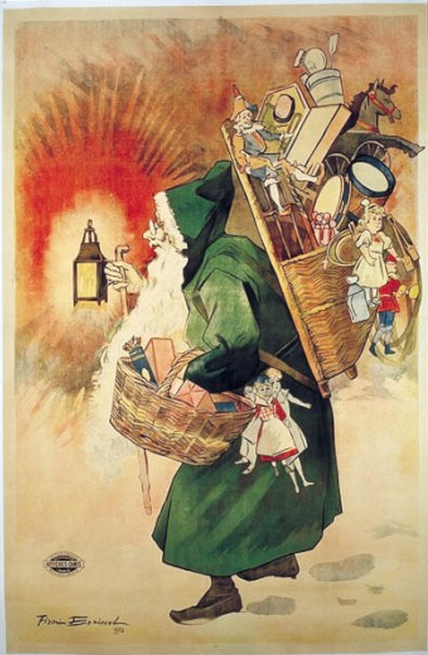
Père Noël, the French Father Christmas

Christmas in France is a major annual celebration, as in most countries of the Christian world. Christmas is celebrated as a public holiday in France on December 25.

Public life on Christmas Day is generally quiet. Post offices, banks, stores, restaurants, cafés, and other businesses are closed. Many people in France put up a Christmas tree, visit a special church service, eat an elaborate meal, and open gifts on Christmas Eve. Other activities include walking in the park, participating in city life, and sharing a meal with family and close friends.

== Père Noël ==
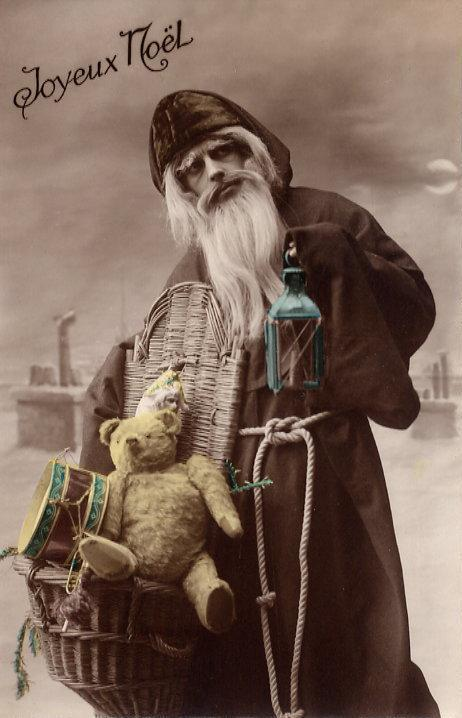

Père Noël (French pronunciation: [pɛʁ nɔ.ɛl]), "Santa", sometimes called “Papa Noël” ("Father Christmas"), is a legendary gift-bringer at Christmas in France and other French-speaking areas, identified with the Father Christmas or Santa Claus of English-speaking territories. According to tradition, on Christmas Eve children leave their shoes by the fireplace filled with carrots and treats for Père Noël's donkey, Gui (French for "Mistletoe") before they go to bed. Père Noël takes the offerings and, if the child has been good, leaves presents in their place. Presents are traditionally small enough to fit in the shoes; candy, money, or small toys.

== Music ==
=== Carols ===
Carol	Composer /Lyricist	Year published	Notes
"Il est né, le divin enfant"	Traditional French	c. 1875	called mabior
"Les Anges dans nos campagnes"			Translated into English as "Angels We Have Heard on High"
"Minuit, Chrétiens" (Cantique de Noël)	lyrics: Placide Cappeau, music: Adolphe Adam	1843 (lyrics), 1847 (music)	Translated into English as "O Holy Night"
"Noël nouvelet"		15th century	Translated into English as "Sing We Now of Christmas"
"Patapan" ("Guillô, pran ton tamborin!")	Burgundian traditional		Title translation: Willy, take your tambourine
"Petit Papa Noël"	lyrics: Raymond Vincy; music: Henri Martinet	1946	
"C'est Noël"	lyrics: Jean Manse; music: Henri Betti	1956	Song written for the movie Honoré de Marseille with Fernandel
"Quelle est cette odeur agréable?"			Translated into English as "Whence Is That Goodly Fragrance Flowing?"
"Un flambeau, Jeannette, Isabelle"		1553	Translated into English as "Bring a Torch, Jeanette, Isabella"
"La Marche Des Rois Mages"		13th century traditional	Translated into English as "March of the Kings"
"Entre le bœuf et l'âne gris"		13th or 16th century	Title translation: "Between the ox and the grey donkey"
"Çà, bergers, assemblons-nous"		music 15th/16th century; published 1701 with words by Simon-Joseph Pellegrin	Title translation: "Here, shepherds, let us gather". Adapted from "Où s'en vont ces gais bergers".
"Venez divin Messie"		music 16th century; published 18th century with words by Simon-Joseph Pellegrin	Translated in English as "O Come, Divine Messiah".
"D'où viens-tu, bergère?"			Title translation "Where are you coming from, shepherdess?"
"Dans cette étable"		words 19th century	Title translation: "In this stable". It is sung to the same music as "Es ist ein Ros entsprungen"

== Food ==
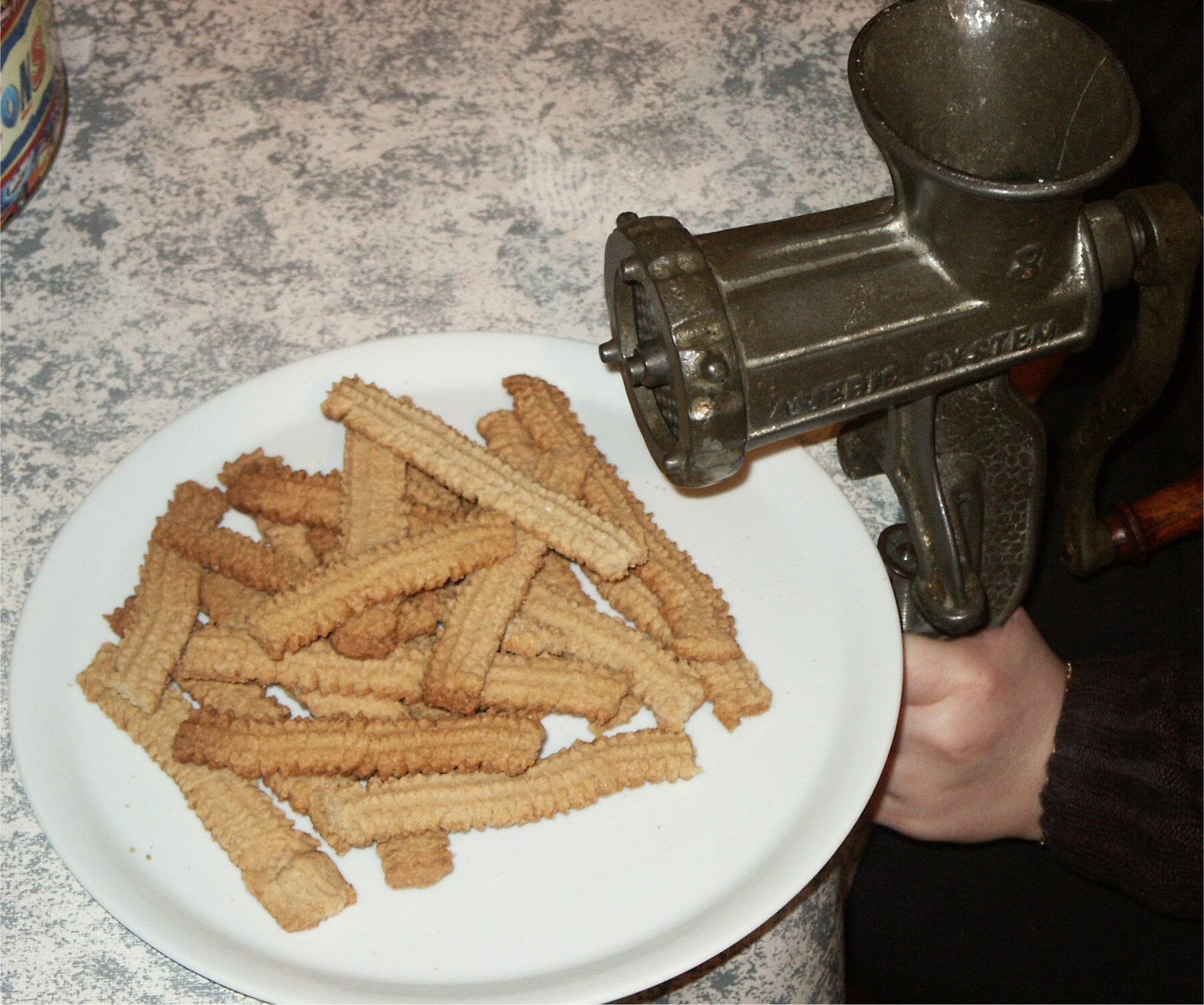
Spritz: cookies traditionally prepared for Christmas in eastern France.

Some typical French Christmas foods include:

- Truffles
- Rabbit terrine
- Roasted capon
- Garlic soup
- Salad, peas, green beans, carrots and potatoes
- Small chocolate and sweet candies

Traditional French Christmas food includes a lot of meats (ham, turkey, chicken and beef) with sides like mashed potatoes, beans, salad, peas and carrots. Soup and bread is also very popular. Desserts include Yule log cake, cupcakes, muffins and other cakes along with small sweet and chocolate candies.

== Decoration and décor ==
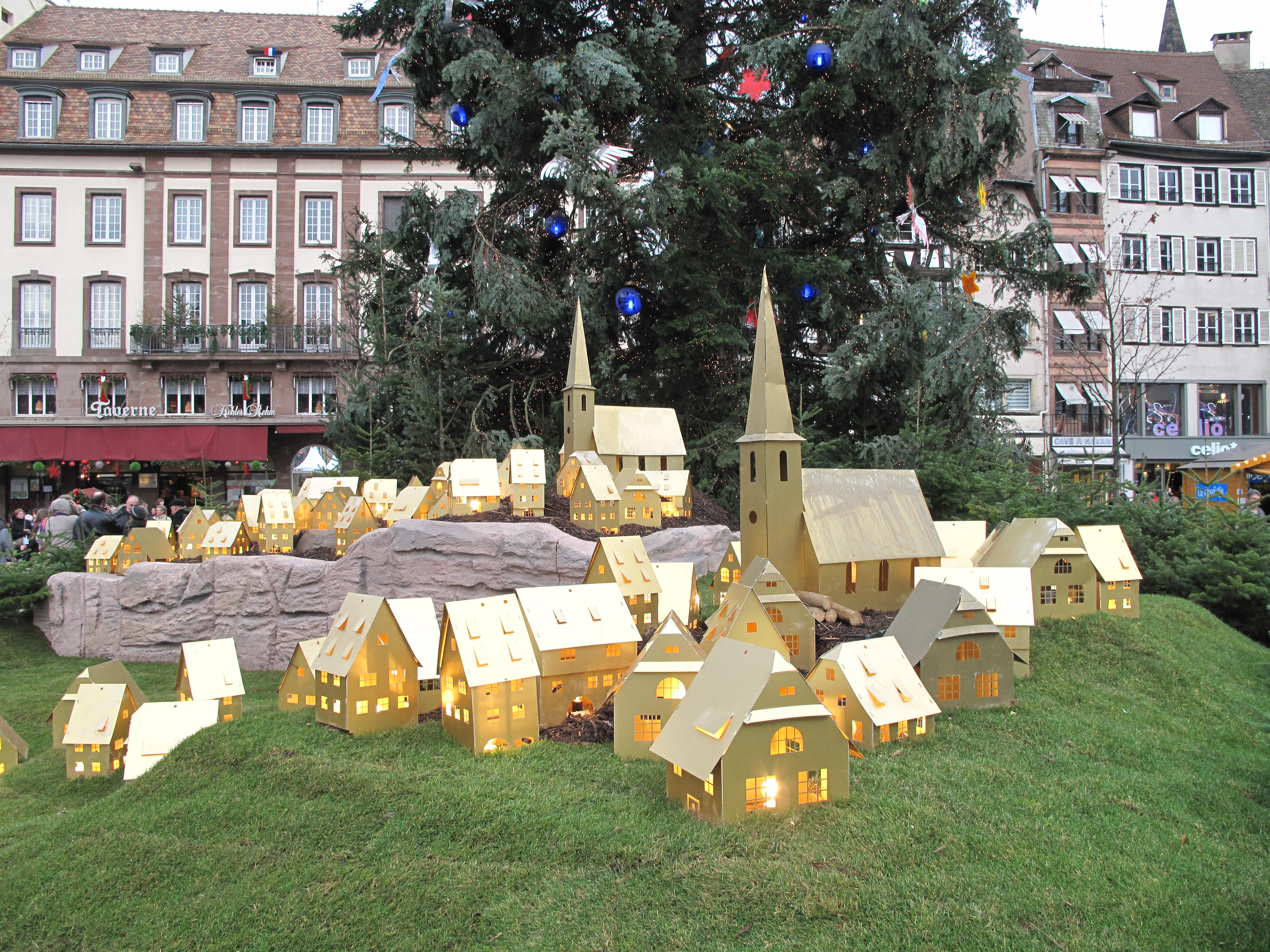
Illuminated house models at the foot of the tall Christmas tree in Strasbourg, France

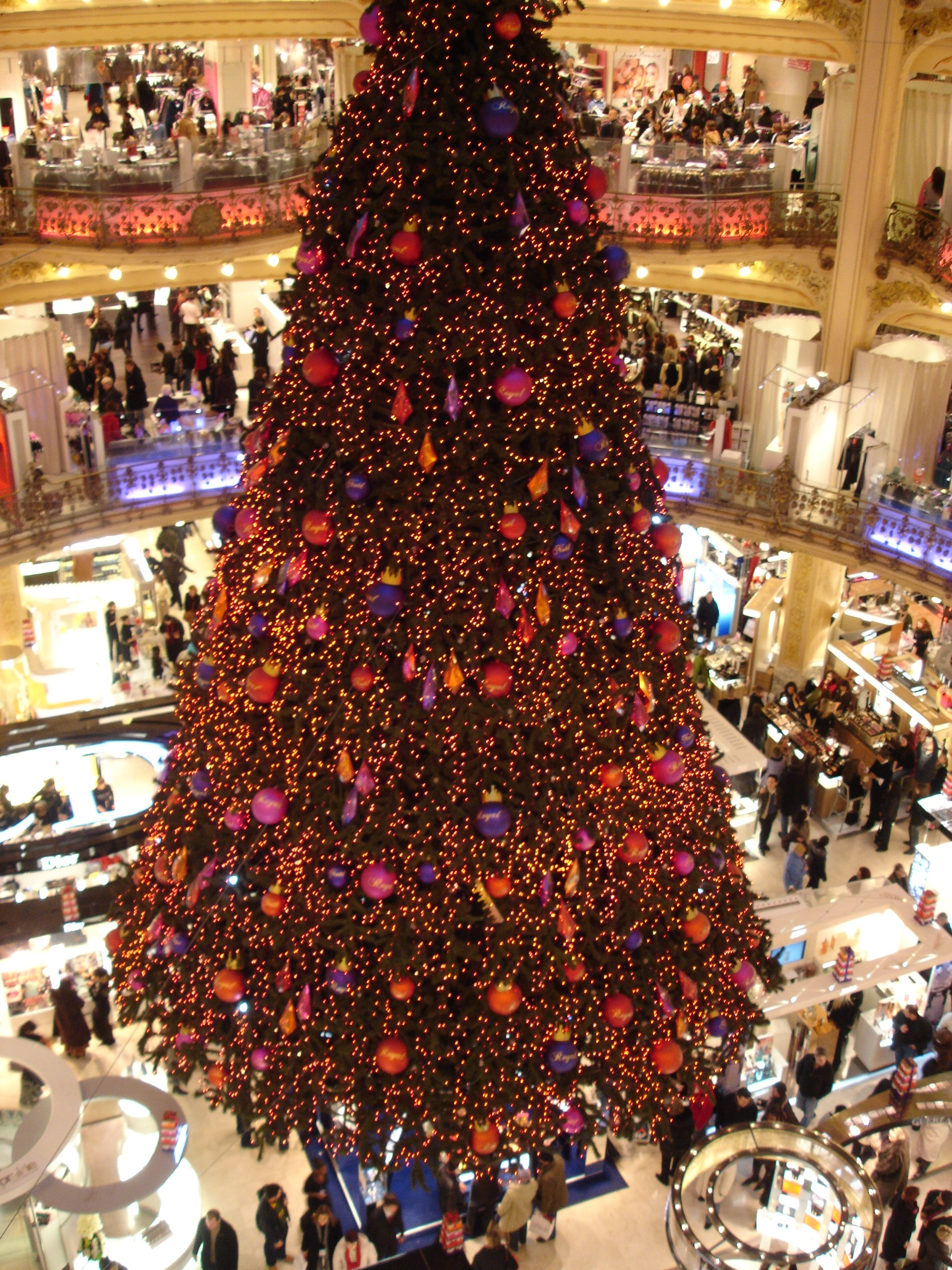
Christmas tree in Paris

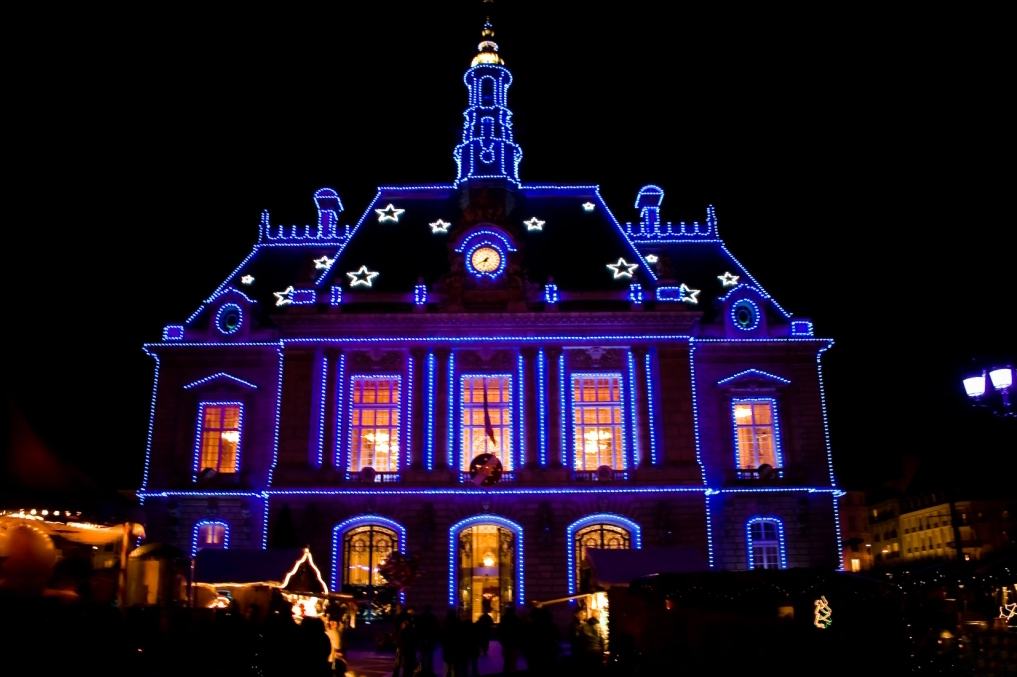
Town Hall of Levallois-Perret lit up with Christmas lights

Decorating for Christmas is very common in France. Christmas markets usually begin in late November or early December and last until Christmas, spreading across various regions of France. The Christmas market in Strasbourg is the most famous, attracting visitors from all over the world. These markets offer Christmas decorations, handmade crafts, delicious food, and warm drinks such as mulled wine.Many households, public spaces, and businesses are decorated with lights and Christmas trees. Advent wreaths (Couronnes de l'Avent) are also common, they are made up of fir and pine tree branches for the first Sunday of Advent. The Advent wreath is topped by four candles, symbolizing the four Sundays leading up to Christmas. Each candle is lit on each successive Sunday before Christmas.

Trees can either be decorated or can have a simple homely and traditional décor. Instead of putting up ornamental Christmas decorations on the trees, often red ribbons are used for decorating the trees. Glass or plastic ornaments that resemble the apples that were traditionally hung from Christmas trees in France are also used for decorating the trees. Small white candles are also used. The use of mistletoe is considered to bring good luck and every household in France hangs mistletoe on the doors during Christmas. Some French people decorate their Christmas trees (Sapin de Noël) and set up a Nativity scene (Crèche) with small clay figurines or wooden figures to recreate the scene of Jesus' birth. It is kept till New Year and there is a belief that if you kiss it at midnight, luck will favour you and you'll be filled with happiness and prosperity in the coming year.

Some other popular decorations include shoes instead of stockings. The use of candles is very popular and they are typically set on tables during Christmas meals or set on window sills. Many French households, especially Christian ones, have nativity scenes. Also known as the crèche, it is kept in the living room and can be elaborate or simple, depending on individual preference.

== See also ==
- Christmas traditions
