= L'Aurore (newspaper founded 1944) =

20th-century French newspaper

- Founded: 11 September 1944 as a daily newspaper
- Ceased publication: 1985 merged with Le Figaro
- Political alignment: Centre-right
- Language: French
- Headquarters: Paris, France

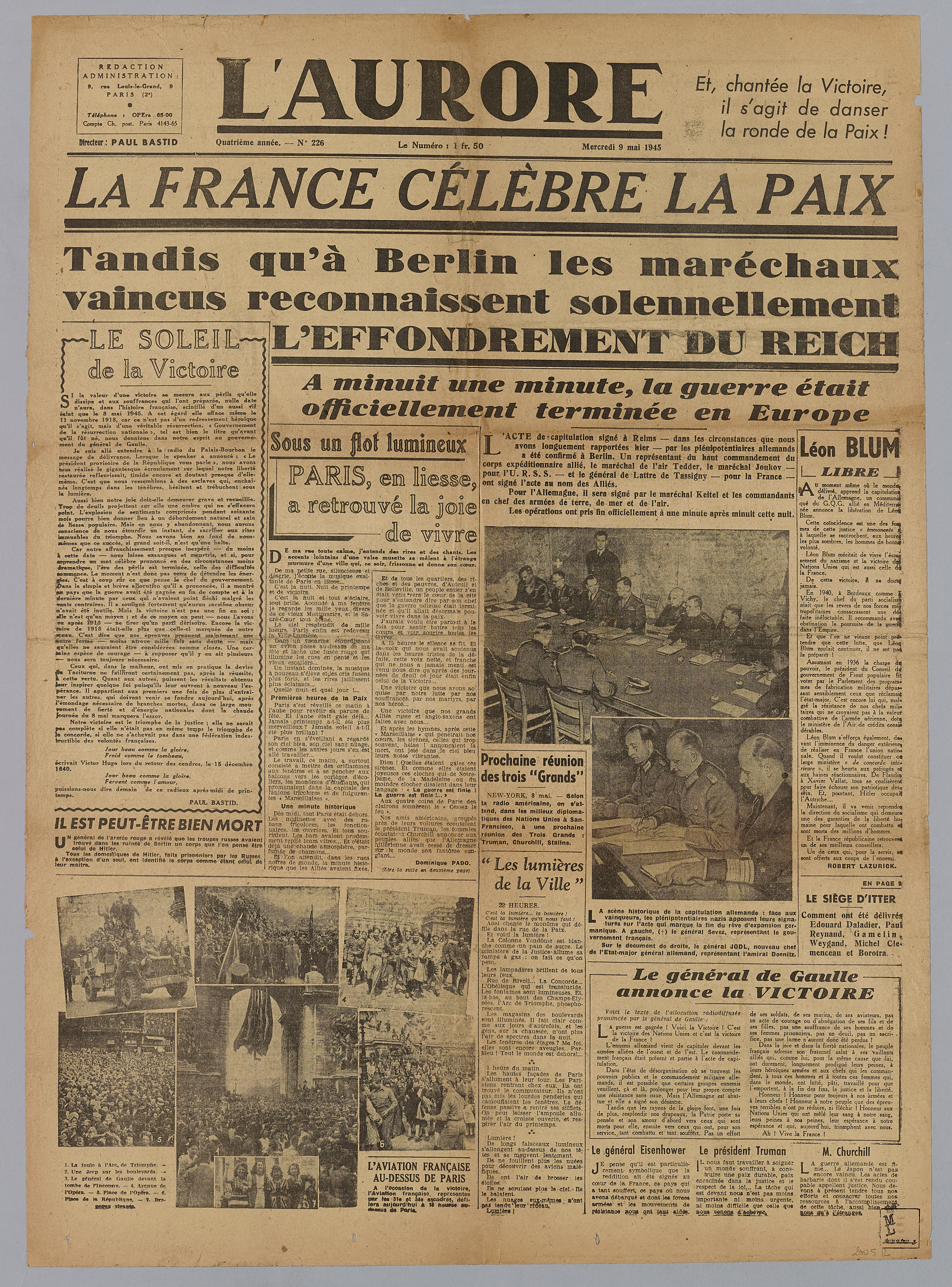
Front page from 1945

L'Aurore (French: [loʁɔʁ]) was a French newspaper first sold on 11 September 1944 soon after the Liberation of Paris. Its name refers to a previously unrelated publication, L'Aurore (1897–1914). The publication of L'Aurore ended in 1985.

== Background ==
During 1943, several issues of L'Aurore were published in secret by Robert Lazurick (a former member of the Front Populaire). After the Liberation of Paris, in 1944, Lazurick, Jean Piot, and Paul Bastid obtained official authority to publish their paper under the title L'Aurore (the dawn), in reference to Clemenceau, and also to J'accuse…! by Émile Zola, published in the previous L'Aurore in 1898.

L'Aurore hit newsstands on September 11, 1944. The paper's offices were located in Paris, at 9 rue Louis-le-Grand, which were previously occupied by the news daily L'Oeuvre, which had been denied authority to resume publication. In 1954, L'Aurore moved to 100 rue de Richelieu in the 2nd arrondissement, in the former offices of the historic Le Journal. Circulation exceeded 90,000 by January 1945. Within short time, the daily had become among the four most significant news publications in the after-war period. By 1953, the company had purchased several other publications, including L'Epoque, France Libre, and Ce Matin-Le Pays.

== Boussac period ==
In 1951, Marcel Boussac, a powerful textile industrialist in the capital, owned a 74.3% controlling stake in the paper. Under his guidance, the paper's political slant leaned towards the causes of the middle, working, artisan classes. In the Algerian War, the paper preferred the rights of the Pieds-Noirs. In the 1960s, in a Gaullist political climate, the paper served as a voice of opposition for centrists, taking up causes like the plight of Jean Lecanuet. After the accidental death of Robert Lazurick in April 1968, his widow Francine Lazurick (née Bonitzer), succeeded him in his role at the paper. She worked integrally with the chief editors, including Roland Faure (foreign politics), Gilbert Guilleminault (society, culture, general news), Dominique Pado (domestic politics), Andre Guerin (editorial), Jose Van den Esch (economy, society), and Georges Merchier (science, education, religion). Roger Alexandre was the last managing director of L'Aurore.

== From Jules Romains to Pierre Desproges ==
In July 1956, L'Aurore was the premier daily featuring color illustrations on the front and back pages. Circulation, which in 1952 had numbered 400,000, increased to more than 500,000 daily subscriptions between 1956 and 1962, which in some years in the period surpassed Le Figaro in total daily circulation.

Renowned among news teams of the era, André Frossard, Jules Romains, and Jean Mistler, were all members of the Académie française. Pierre Desproges collaborated with his childhood friend, the judicial journalist and author Annette Kahn. Other journalists who collaborated on L'Aurore: Phillipe Bernet, Gilbert Ganne, Gérald Schurr, Anne Manson, Évelyne Le Garrec, Jean-Claude Goudeau, Jean Laborde, André Sirvin, Alain Riou, Jacques Bouzerand, Bernard Morrot, Francis Schull, Jacques Lesinge, Jacques Malherbes, Jacques Chambaz, André Bloch, Andrée Nordon, Jacques-Marie Bourget, Jean-Michel Saint-Ouen.

== Hersant period ==
In 1978, after Boussac sold the paper to Marcel Fournier (president of supermarket chain Carrefour), the paper was sold again to Robert Hersant. Francine Lazurick vacated her position as managing director in response, as did the editor at the time, Dominique Pado. Pierre Janrot, a member of the Groupe Hersant publishing conglomerate, replaced Lazurick as managing director of L'Aurore on November 3 that year.

Robert Hersant gradually pulled support for the paper, which had previously been a direct competitor to Le Figaro, another Hersant publication. In doing so, he incrementally merged L'Aurore with other publications in the conglomerate. As a result, within several years, L'Aurore had lost its identity as an independent content publication, with the exception of the editorial page, which until 1982 was written by Jacques Guilleme-Brulon (foreign politics) or, more frequently, by Guy Baret (domestic politics). Under their influence, L'Aurore leaned politically rightward in its last days as an independent paper. In 1985, L'Aurore was integrated fully into Le Figaro, though it survived in title, in the Saturday supplement, Le Figaro-L'Aurore.
