= Consequences of the Chernobyl disaster in France =

The consequences of the Chernobyl disaster in France have been a subject of debate ever since the disaster struck in 1986. Officially, there were no negative health consequences in France, but this is disputed by certain associations, often close to anti-nuclear movements, who are calling for greater transparency on the part of the public authorities.

== Passage of the radioactive plume over France ==
=== Announcement of the disaster ===
On April 28, 1986, at around 1 p.m., the Swedes directly informed the Central Service for Protection against Ionizing Radiation (SCPRI), part of the Ministry of Health (but also the European Reference Center for the Measurement of Low Level Radioactivity), of the contamination of their atmosphere, which they attributed to a Soviet nuclear accident. That evening, the Kremlin acknowledged that an accident had occurred in an RBMK-type reactor at the Chernobyl power plant, without specifying the date, extent, or causes. That same evening, Professor Pierre Pellerin, director of the SCPRI, had Air France planes bound for northern and eastern Europe fitted with filters so that, on their return, the composition of the contamination could be analyzed and made known. Invited to appear on Antenne 2 the following day, April 29, Pierre Pellerin reported on his contacts with Swedish experts, denounced the media's catastrophism in advance, and offered reassuring words: "Even for Scandinavians, health is not threatened. That same evening, his deputy, Professor Chanteur, responded to a question from the presenter: "we'll certainly be able to detect the passage of particles in a few days, but from a public health point of view, there's no risk". In France, the weather forecasts were favorable, and a weather presenter, Brigitte Simonetta, announced on Antenne 2, on the evening of the 30th, that the Azores anticyclone should delay the possible arrival of the radioactive plume.

The term "cloud" was soon popularized in France, instead of "plume". The plume, which is made up of all the radioactive emissions released in the days following the accident, mixed with the hot air from the reactor fire, contains very little water vapor. It dilutes in the atmosphere, its radioactivity decreasing according to the half-lives of the radioelements released. Deposition in dry weather depends on the mass of the particles or aerosols and the terrain. However, real clouds play an important role: if they break above the plume, their water droplets carry the radioactive particles away more abundantly. The combination of the two, which is very difficult to predict, creates geographically heterogeneous wet deposits in the shape of leopard spots.

=== The arrival of the plume ===
Detection of the radioactive aerosols flying over France after the accident was rapid. Measurements of p-total activity (a measure of the activity of all beta-emitting radionuclides) in the air surrounding Commissariat à l'énergie atomique (CEA) centers were taken within 24 hours of their detection (between April 29 and 30). By May 1, we were aware of an abnormal rise in air activity on April 29 and 30.

=== Official statements ===
The French government considers that no special safety measures are necessary. The Service Central de Protection Contre Les Rayonnements Ionisants (SCPRI), headed by Professor Pierre Pellerin and reporting to the Ministry of Health, issued its first statement on April 29, 1986, announcing that "no significant rise in radioactivity has been observed". Seventeen years later, an analysis of the measurements taken at the time confirms this diagnosis: "Atmospheric aerosol measurements, mainly carried out by the SCPRI and the CEA, made it possible to characterize contaminated air masses very rapidly, providing a good indication of the levels of activity reached. These measurements [...] enabled the doses received by the population as the cloud passed through to be assessed within a satisfactory timeframe. These low doses with less than 0.5 μSv for external irradiation and less than 20 μSv for inhalation, did not require any special measures to protect the population (sheltering or distribution of stable iodine)." In a press release issued on April 30, the SCPRI mentioned a "slight increase in atmospheric radioactivity, not significant for public health".

On May 2, 1986, Professor Pellerin issued a press release stating that "preventive iodine doses are neither justified nor appropriate" and that "we would have to imagine elevations ten or a hundred thousand times higher for significant public health problems to arise".

=== Radioactive cloud controversy ===
On April 30, 1986, presenter Brigitte Simonetta announced in an Antenne 2 weather bulletin that France should be protected from the "cloud" by the Azores anticyclone and that it could remain so for the next three days.

A controversy ensued, with many statements aimed specifically at Pierre Pellerin, often summed up as "le nuage s'est arrêté à la frontière" ("the cloud has stopped at the border"). Libération asserted that "the public authorities lied in France" and that "Professor Pellerin [had] admitted as much", while the newspaper clearly stated on May 2, 1986, that he had announced that "the increase in radioactivity recorded throughout France was without any danger to health".

Later, Professor Pellerin filed a libel suit against various media outlets and personalities who had claimed that he had stated that "the Chernobyl cloud stopped at the French border". As he had never uttered this statement, he won all his cases at first instance, on appeal and in cassation. A French court conviction for "public defamation of a civil servant" of Noël Mamère for remarks made in 1999 was sanctioned by the European Court of Human Rights, which ruled that in 1999 "the SCPRI no longer existed and, aged 76, the civil servant in question was no longer in active service".

== Controversies over contamination ==
=== Negligible level of traces found ===
To appreciate the real level of nuclear pollution found in France, it is important to bear in mind that in terms of external irradiation:

- Ground-level contamination of 1 MBq/m2 in cesium 137 (one million becquerels per square meter) results in a dose rate of a few tens of mSv per year (1.5 to 4 μSv/h) for a person permanently exposed to it.
- The reference threshold laid down by the European Union, below which radiation exposure is in practice negligible from the point of view of radiation protection and does not require declaration, is 1 μSv/h. In France, the exposure limit for the public and unclassified workers in a company is 1 mSv/year whole body, i.e. around 80 μSv/month, which is equivalent to 100 mSv/h if you count 24 hours a day (if the establishment in question doesn't operate 24 hours a day, it's up to the Radiation Protection Competent Person to adapt the calculation for their zoning plan if they so wish). This limit refers to the radiation produced by the company in a non-regulated area (not including medical care in a hospital, for example), and can be as high as 20 mSv/year for some workers. The French average is 4.5 mSv/year, of which 3 mSv is due to natural radioactivity.

=== The average dose received by the population ===
The average dose received following the passage of the Chernobyl "cloud" over France has been estimated by some sources at around 0.01 mSv (millisievert), "corresponding to a stay of a few weeks in the mountains" (for external irradiation), and by others at between 0.025 mSv and 0.4 mSv, depending on geographical location. Georges Charpak notes that "the average dose received by the French population in 1986 is estimated at between less than 0.025 mSv in the West and 0.4 mSv in the East". In all cases, these doses fall within the low radiation dose range.

Twelve years after the cloud's passage, geographically more precise retrospective studies have been carried out, such as the CAROL project for the lower Rhône valley, which concluded that there was a very clear correlation between surface contamination of the soil and rainfall at the time of the cloud's passage: "Negligible in the Camargue region, these wet deposits routinely exceeded 15,000 Bq-m-2, and 25,000 Bq-m-2 in the most heavily watered areas at the beginning of May 1986, such as around Vaison-la-Romaine. This was in addition to the remanence of old fallout from atmospheric testing of nuclear weapons, of the order of 1,500 to 2,500 Bq-m-2. This study also revealed considerable heterogeneity between contaminations measured within the same municipality and put forward several explanatory hypotheses, as well as assessing the uncertainties involved in this type of mapping.

=== Controversy over initial estimates ===
A re-examination of the data collected shows that the first communications had underestimated the fallout, sometimes by a factor of ten: "In 1986, a map of theoretical caesium 137 and iodine 131 deposits indicated higher levels than initially estimated, particularly in eastern France where rainfall exceeded 20 mm. The SCPRI's first report on May 7 mentioned very low deposits under 1,000 Bq/m^{2}, but their June bulletin showed average regional deposits of caesium-137 ranging from 1,000 to 5,400 Bq/m^{2}, with potential peaks up to 40,000 Bq/m^{2}."

On February 24, 2002, CRIIRAD published an atlas that revealed in detail the contamination of French territory by the Chernobyl cloud. By extrapolation of measurements taken between 1988 and 1992, the towns of Ghisonaccia, Clairvaux-les-Lacs, and Strasbourg are presented as having had caesium-137 surface activities over 30,000 becquerels/m^{2} in May 1986. The orders of magnitude are very similar to those published by IRSN in 2005 in its reconstruction of Chernobyl fallout. In 1992, measurements in some cities revealed levels over 3,000 Bq/m2.

Fallout in France was the subject of an IRSN report.

=== Legal proceedings ===
In the investigation of a complaint lodged in France in 2001 for "poisoning and administration of harmful substances" by the CRIIRAD, the AFMT, and individuals who had contracted thyroid cancer, a report written by Georges Charpak, Richard L. Garwin, and Venance Journé, asserted that the SCPRI had provided "inaccurate maps in several areas" and "did not return all the information at its disposal to the decision-making authorities or the public". The report criticizes SCPRI for false communication, but not for endangering the population.

Opened in 2001, the judicial investigation was led by Judge Marie-Odile Bertella-Geffroy. Faced with the difficulty of establishing a causal link between the government's cover-ups and thyroid disease, Judge Bertella-Geffroy reclassified the "poisoning" complaint as a criminal offense, with the broader charge of "aggravated deception". On May 31, 2006, Pierre Pellerin was indicted for "breach of the consumer code" and "aggravated deception", and placed under assisted witness status for the offenses of "unintentional injury and unintentional harm to the integrity of the person". Pierre Pellerin would have liked to have been indicted, as he "was unaware of the exact content of the charges against him".

The case was dismissed on September 7, 2011. On November 20, 2012, he was found innocent of the charges of "deception and aggravated deception" by the Paris Court of Cassation, which explained in particular that it was "impossible, given current scientific knowledge, to establish a definite causal link between the pathologies observed and the fallout from the Chernobyl radioactive plume".

== Controversy over health consequences in France ==
=== Thyroid cancers ===
In the Chernobyl area, which was much more exposed than the French regions, there was no increase in the number of adult cancers caused by the disaster, but there was an increase in the number of children affected, estimated at 5,000 cases.

In France, the Institut de veille sanitaire rules out an increase in thyroid cancers as a result of Chernobyl fallout. However, a medical thesis published a few months after this report, in 2011, establishes a link between the disaster and the increase in diagnosed cancers: that of Doctor Sophie Fauconnier, daughter of Doctor Denis Fauconnier. The latter, interviewed in a program broadcast on France Culture in January 2015, explains that "it's politics that controls scientific data".

==== Effects of low-dose radiation ====
The health consequences of low doses of radiation are controversial, and two main hypotheses exist:

- according to internationally accepted methods, notably those of the World Health Organization (WHO), the risk of cancer varies linearly with the dose, without there being any threshold at which the risk disappears; this is the hypothesis taken up by a report by the French Academy of Sciences in 1995, and a report by the American Academy of Science. If we accept this hypothesis, the Chernobyl disaster has led to an increase in cancer deaths in France;
- according to preliminary research results, which are viewed with interest by the scientific community but which do not meet with consensus, low doses of radiation would have no harmful consequences in terms of cancer, and the risk could even decrease in certain cases (hormesis phenomenon); this is the thesis defended by Professor André Aurengo, as well as the French National Academy of Medicine. If we accept this hypothesis, the Chernobyl disaster has not led to an increase in the number of cancers in France.

In France, the Académie des Sciences and the Académie de Médecine adopted the conclusions of Professor Aurengo's working group in 2005.

==== Number of additional cancers ====
Georges Charpak estimated the additional number of cancers at 100 deaths over one year, and around 300 over 30 years, assuming an average dose of 0.05 mSv one year after Chernobyl, i.e. around 10,000. He concludes that "the vast majority of cancers were not caused by the accident, even in the worst-affected areas, with the notable exception of thyroid cancer, which accounted for all fatal cancers over the same period".

According to the INVS study published in 2006, the results do not generally point to a possible effect of the Chernobyl accident on thyroid cancers in France. However, the observed incidence of thyroid cancer in Corsica is high in men.

IRSN refuses to provide estimates of the quantities of iodine-131 deposited in the French environment following the Chernobyl accident. These data, requested since 2009 by INSERM Villejuif research director Florent de Valthaire, are intended for a study on thyroid cancers.

==== Legal action by thyroid patients ====
Since March 2001, 400 lawsuits have been filed in France against "X" by the Association française des malades de la thyroïde, including 200 in April 2006. These people, affected by thyroid cancer or goiter, have accused the French government, then headed by Prime Minister Jacques Chirac, of failing to properly inform the population of the risks associated with radioactive fallout from the Chernobyl disaster. The accusation links public health protection measures in neighboring countries (such as warnings against the consumption of green vegetables or milk by children and pregnant women) with the relatively high levels of contamination in eastern France and Corsica. Several European studies (including the 2006 IRSN study) have investigated a possible correlation between the Chernobyl disaster and the increase in the number of thyroid cancers in Europe, without being able to establish a causal link. As the causes of death are no longer the same, the proportion of deaths from cancer is increasing, this predates the disaster and is also observed in non-contaminated areas. New complaints are nevertheless being lodged by sufferers, and the courts have yet to rule on this phenomenon.

In a letter published at their own expense in Libération on November 19, 2005, 52 medical specialists, including Maurice Tubiana and Léon Schwartzenberg, point out that "these French patients are hostages to an anti-nuclear and legal-medical lobby": while only children were affected in Ukraine, most of the French plaintiffs were adults in 1986. The signatories pointed out that:

- the incidence of thyroid cancer has increased 3-fold since 1975, but without any acceleration after 1986;
- the cloud had indeed crossed eastern France, the Midi and Corsica, and the authorities had announced this as early as May 1, 1986;
- the wind had dispersed the radioactive particles, which had decreased by a factor of 50,000 during the 2,000 km journey;
- the quantity of radioactivity breathed in by the population and deposited on the ground was below the alert threshold at the time.

According to the French Nuclear Energy Society, "Cancer registries have revealed a preferential increase in cases in western France, the region least exposed to fallout from the radioactive cloud". "The worldwide increase in thyroid cancer discoveries is mainly the result of advances in medicine and screening." "It's a natural need of individuals to find a simple, common-sense explanation, ideally an external one, for the ills that plague them. When it comes to thyroid disease, Chernobyl provides the perfect alibi".

=== Food-related risks ===
On May 7, 1986, a letter from the WHO stated that "restrictions on the immediate consumption of milk may still be justified". A memo dated May 16 from the Ministry of the Interior, then headed by Charles Pasqua, stated: "We have figures that cannot be released. (...) Agreement between SCPRI and IPSN not to release any figures".

According to the French Nuclear Energy Society, studies show that for the extreme case of a hunter consuming 40 kg of "contaminated" wild boar per year, "his committed effective dose would then be around 1 millisievert for the year 1997, i.e. well below the dose resulting from natural radioactivity alone and of the order of the regulatory dose limit established for the public (1 mSv/year) - itself well below levels presenting a proven risk".

== Controversy over the authorities' position ==
In March 2005, two "independent experts", Paul Genty and Gilbert Mouthon, submitted a report to investigating judge Marie-Odile Bertella-Geffroy. This report is part of the judicial investigation begun in March 2001, when the Association française des malades de la thyroïde and CRIIRAD filed a complaint against the French government for "failure to protect the population against radioactive fallout from the accident". They claim to have found that, based on documents seized during searches of ministries and organizations involved in nuclear risk prevention, the radioactivity measurements taken at the time by the French authorities, EDF, Cogema or the Gendarmerie were much higher than those communicated to the press and public.

Based on the Genty-Mouthon report, CRIIRAD called for Professor Pierre Pellerin to be indicted for "deliberately endangering the public and disseminating false news designed to mislead the public about the consequences of the Chernobyl disaster", and for Pierre Galle, Raymond Paulin and Jean Coursaget to be heard on "the erroneous elements" contained in the article Mise au point historique sur Tchernobyl, published by the French Academy of Sciences. The document concluded that "in France, the fallout was much lower than would have justified preventive (health) countermeasures". The Academy secretary pointed out that this article did not express the institution's position, but contributed to the debate.

Later, Professor Pellerin was cleared of the charges brought against him by a decision of the French Supreme Court on November 20, 2012, which ruled that "in the current state of scientific knowledge, it is impossible to establish a definite causal link between the pathologies observed and the fallout from the Chernobyl radioactive plume". Nicolas Sarkozy, later President of the French Republic from 2007 to 2012, was in charge of chemical and radiological risk management at the Ministry of the Interior from 1987 to May 1988, a position that gave rise to controversy in 2007 due to his possible involvement in managing the consequences of the Chernobyl disaster.

== In Corsica ==
Due to heavy rainfall concomitant with the passage of the "Chernobyl cloud" over eastern Corsica, part of this region seems to have been the most affected in France by aerial fallout from the cloud. In addition, populations living in mountainous areas are said to have an iodine-deficient diet, which is an additional risk factor for the thyroid.

Two soil activity measurements for ^{137}Cs were carried out by the authorities in 1986 in the areas most affected by the rains. The first, taken on a soil sample from the Aléria region, showed deposits of 14,500 Bq/m2, while the second showed 19,250 Bq/m2 on an alluvial terrace in the Tavignano valley, at a place called "Tobia" near Corte. For its part, CRIIRAD measured 31,400 Bq/m^{2} on soil in Ghisonaccia. As there were heavy thunderstorms on those days, intense rainfall may also have occurred in areas not equipped with rain gauges. In 2002, based on radioactivity measurements on over a hundred samples, IRSN published a table of measurements for various sites in Corsica, showing that total surface activity was locally high, reaching 89,500 Bq/m^{2} at the Col de Larone, for example.

There were indications that people who had lived or were still living in the areas of Corsica affected by the "Chernobyl cloud" rains were experiencing an increase in several thyroid pathologies, including cancer, but the link with the Chernobyl accident has been disputed. No one denies that the number of thyroid pathologies worldwide has indeed increased (doubling in Europe), and there is a significant increase in the risk of thyroid cancer, reported and scientifically recognized in several countries. However, this increase began before the Chernobyl accident and it is not centered on areas where it rained during the passage of the cloud; a large part of the world not affected by rainfall during the passage of the cloud is also affected by the increase in thyroiditis.

Nevertheless, some anomalies were observed in the case of Corsica, which could be attributed to the passage of the cloud. Two medical experts had been appointed by the courts in response to the concerns of the "Commission on Chernobyl fallout in Corsica", but without being able to produce statistically significant results. To dispel any doubts, the members of the Corsican Assembly decided to "commission an independent (...) epidemiological study of fallout from the Chernobyl disaster in Corsica". This new study was conducted by a team of epidemiologists and statisticians from the University Medical Unit in Genoa. It is based on an analysis of some 14,000 medical records.

In 2013, the authors concluded that men were indeed at greater risk of thyroid pathologies due to exposure to the cloud. The increase in thyroid cancer in men due to the Chernobyl factor was 28.29%, in thyroiditis +78,28%, and in hyperthyroidism 103,21%. For women, the weakness of the statistical samples means that no conclusions can be drawn for pathologies other than thyroiditis; for the latter, the increase due to Chernobyl is put at 55,33%. In the case of Corsican children exposed to the cloud, the study concluded that there was an increase in thyroiditis, benign adenomas, acute leukemia and hypothyroidism.

This study, which was not published in a peer-reviewed journal, has been criticized by an association, which points to methodological weaknesses (error in a calculation, lack of mention of the confidence interval on certain data).

While those in charge of the study point to the methodology used to eliminate possible confounding factors, including the general increase in cases of thyroid cancer, the French Minister of Health, Marisol Touraine, points out this possible confounding factor, and rejects the results because "the Italian study does not today, according to its methodological data, make it possible to establish a more direct causal link between the Chernobyl cloud and the development of these cancers". The IRSN judged in an opinion that "the authors' interpretations in terms of 'risks attributable to the Chernobyl cloud' go far beyond what the analyses carried out should allow".

The commission appointed by the Corsican regional authority, which commissioned the study, and its president Josette Risterucci, consider that the increase in risk is now indisputable. On the occasion of the study's presentation, she deplored "the lack of responsiveness of the competent authorities" during the passage of the cloud, as well as the shortcomings of the investigations carried out by official bodies, which led to "a noxious situation of confusion and polemics". She calls for "official recognition of the damage". In a report broadcast on France Culture in October 2013, a Corsican doctor admits to having kept quiet for 27 years about the increase in thyroid pathologies to "protect his career".

== See also ==
- Effects of the Chernobyl disaster
- Nuclear and radiation accidents and incidents
- List of civilian nuclear accidents

== Bibliography ==
- Aurengo, André (2006). Tchernobyl : quelles conséquences pour la France ? (in French). Pour la science. ISSN 0153-4092.
- CRIIRAD; Paris, André (2002). Contaminations radioactives : atlas France et Europe. Écologie (in French). Gap, Y. Michel. ISBN 2-913492-15-0.
- Jacquemin, Jean-Michel (1999). Ce fameux nuage, Tchernobyl : la France contaminée : suivi d'un dossier sur les conséquences dans la région de Tchernobyl. Les dossiers de l'écologie (in French). Sang de la terre. ISBN 2-86985-120-0.
- Jacquemin, Jean-Michel (2001). Tchernobyl : aujourd'hui, les Français malades. Un pavé dans la mare (in French). Éditions du Rocher. ISBN 2-86985-120-0.
- Jacquemin, Jean-Michel (2002). Tchernobyl, j'accuse ! : conséquences en France. Les dossiers de l'écologie (in French). Sang de la terre. ISBN 2-86985-146-4.
- Jacquemin, Jean-Michel (2006). Tchernobyl, 20 ans après : cachez ce nuage que je ne saurais voir (in French). G. Trédaniel. ISBN 2-84445-676-6.
- Lerouge, Bernard (2009). Tchernobyl, un nuage passe : les faits et les controverses. Questions contemporaines / Série Globalisation et sciences sociales (in French). l'Harmattan. ISBN 978-2-296-06685-4.
- Micoulaut, Raymond (2006). Tchernobyl : l'histoire d'une désinformation. Questions contemporaines (in French). l'Harmattan. ISBN 2-296-00512-8.
- Renaud, Philippe; Champion, Didier; Brenot, Jean (2007). Les Retombées radioactives de l'accident de Tchernobyl sur le territoire français : conséquences environnementales et exposition des personnes (in French). éd. Tec & doc. ISBN 978-2-7430-1027-0.
- Tchernobyl : anatomie d'un nuage : inventaire provisoire des dégâts physiques et moraux consécutifs à la catastrophe du 26 avril 1986 (in French). Éditions Gérard Lebovici. 1987.
