= Ginette Garcin =

French actress

- Born: 4 January 1928; Marseille, France
- Died: 10 June 2010 (aged 82); Nanterre, France
- Occupation: Actress
- Years active: 1946–2010
- Spouse: Robert Beauvais

Ginette Garcin (4 January 1928 – 10 June 2010) was a French actress of stage, film and television.

== Biography ==
She lived in Audresselles, Pas-de-Calais. Ginette Garcin made her musical debut with Jacques Hélian and his orchestra in 1946. She then worked with Loulou Gasté and went on to appear in Strélesky's absurdist theatre revues in Rouen. Her portrayal of Charlot to the music of Deux petits chaussons was very well received. She collaborated with Colette Vudal (who later adopted the name Colette Monroy in Paris) Mona Monick and Robert Thomas, author of some successful detective plays.

Garcin was one of the first to perform and record the songs of Boby Lapointe and Jean Yanne in the 1960s. In the 1970s, she embarked on a career in film and theatre, with guidance from Audiard, Lelouch, Yanne, Boisset and Tacchella. She appeared in the television series Marc et Sophie. In 1990, she wrote the critically acclaimed Le clan des veuves in which she starred alongside Jackie Sardou for four years. In 1997, she had an acting and singing role in Le passe-muraille, a musical comedy by Marcel Aymé with Didier van Cauwelaert and Michel Legrand.

In her final decade, Ginette Garcin played a character in the television series Famille d'accueil as well as appearing in the films La Beuze and Les Dalton. A new version of Le clan des veuves was staged at the Bouffes-Parisiens theatre in 2006.

Also in her later years she appeared in Raphaël Mezrahi's play, Monique est demandée en caisse 12.

== Death ==
She died on 10 June 2010 at age 82 of breast cancer.

== Filmography ==
Year	Title	Role	Director	Notes
1968	La prunelle		Edmond Tiborovsky	TV series (1 episode)
1969	En votre âme et conscience		Jean Bertho	TV series (1 episode)
1971	Le drapeau noir flotte sur la marmite	Séverine	Michel Audiard	
1972	Le Tueur	Lulu	Denys de La Patellière	
1972	Tout le monde il est beau, tout le monde il est gentil	The singer	Jean Yanne	
1972	La vie et la passion de Dodin-Bouffant		Edmond Tiborovsky	TV movie
1973	The Hostage Gang	Ginette Bertheau	Édouard Molinaro	
1973	Moi y'en a vouloir des sous	Ginette	Jean Yanne	
1974	Par ici la monnaie	Fernande	Richard Balducci	
1974	Juliette and Juliette	Miss Quiblier	Remo Forlani	
1974	Comment réussir quand on est con et pleurnichard	The head nurse	Michel Audiard	
1975	Cousin Cousine	Biju	Jean-Charles Tacchella	
1975	The Common Man	Ginette Lajoie	Yves Boisset	
1976	Oublie-moi, Mandoline	Marie-Charlotte	Michel Wyn	
1976	The Smurfs and the Magic Flute	Dame Barde	Peyo	
1976	Le temps d'un regard	The hotelier	Boramy Tioulong	TV movie
1976	Le gentleman des Antipodes	Méline	Boramy Tioulong	TV movie
1976	La Noiraude	La Noiraude	Jean-Louis Fournier	TV series (61 episodes)
1977	Le pays bleu	Zoé	Jean-Charles Tacchella	
1977	L'exercice du pouvoir	Madame Sartène	Philippe Galland	
1978	Ne pleure pas	Madame Lafarge	Jacques Ertaud	
1978	Désiré Lafarge	Miss Tirieu	Jean Pignol	TV series (1 episode)
1978	Les Cinq Dernières Minutes	Lucie	Jean Chapot	TV series (1 episode)
1978	Les enquêtes du commissaire Maigret	Madame Blanche	Jean-Paul Sassy	TV series (1 episode)
1979	Charles et Lucie	Lucie	Nelly Kaplan	
1979	Rien ne va plus		Jean-Michel Ribes	
1979	La grâce	Marianne Huchemin	Pierre Tchernia	TV movie
1979	Pierrot mon ami	Madame Pradonet	François Leterrier	TV movie
1979	Les fleurs fanées	Mathilde	Jacques Fansten	TV movie
1979	Le destin de Priscilla Davies	The chair	Raymond Rouleau	TV movie
1980	Docteur Teyran	Ginette	Jean Chapot	TV movie
1981	La gueule du loup	Fernande	Michel Léviant	
1981	Les Uns et les Autres	Ginette	Claude Lelouch	
1981	Comment draguer toutes les filles...	Religious woman	Michel Vocoret	
1981	Messieurs les jurés	Raymonde Entraigues	Boramy Tioulong	TV series (1 episode)
1981	Les enquêtes du commissaire Maigret	Désirée Brault	Stéphane Bertin	TV series (1 episode)
1982	Ce fut un bel été	Dominique	Jean Chapot	TV movie
1982	Les joies de la famille Pinelli	Germaine	Jean L'Hôte	TV movie
1983	Édith et Marcel	Guite	Claude Lelouch	
1983	Un psy pour deux	Antoine's mother	Serge Korber	TV movie
1983	Le disparu du 7 octobre	Marie Fortier	Jacques Ertaud	TV movie
1983	Les uns et les autres	Ginette	Claude Lelouch	TV mini-series
1983	Les amours romantiques	Madame Taverneau	Stéphane Bertin	TV series (1 episode)
1984	Our Story	The florist	Bertrand Blier	
1984	American Dreamer	Nurse	Rick Rosenthal	
1984	Lace	Madame Chardin	William Hale	TV mini-series
1985	Slices of Life	Béatrice's mother	François Leterrier	
1985	Partir, revenir	The priest's servant	Claude Lelouch	
1985	Un garçon de France	Madame Longin	Guy Gilles	TV movie
1985	Série noire	Simone	Jacques Ertaud	TV series (1 episode)
1985	Les amours des années 50		Philippe Galardi	TV series (1 episode)
1986	Paris minuit	The tramp	Frédéric Andréi	
1986	Attention bandits!	The maid	Claude Lelouch	
1986	Sins	Madame Guerin	Douglas Hickox	TV mini-series
1987	Il est génial papy!	The concierge	Michel Drach	
1987	L'heure Simenon	The neighbor	Jean-Charles Tacchella	TV series (1 episode)
1987	Florence ou La vie de château	Madame Rateau	Serge Korber	TV series (1 episode)
1987-1991	Marc et Sophie	Mamma	Jean-Daniel Bonnin, Christophe Andrei, ...	TV series (4 episodes)
1988	Le loufiat	Hélène	Annie Butler, Pierre Sisser, ...	TV mini-series
1989	À deux minutes près	The mother-in-law	Éric Le Hung	
1989	Rouget le braconnier	Mother Potard	Gilles Cousin	
1989-1990	Imogène	Maryvonne	François Leterrier & Sylvain Madigan	TV series (4 episodes)
1990	Tribunal	Geneviève Pernoud	Christophe Salachas	TV series (1 episode)
1991	The Professional Secrets of Dr. Apfelgluck	Old Marinette	Alessandro Capone, Thierry Lhermitte, ...	
1991	Crimes et jardins	Ida	Jean-Paul Salomé	TV movie
1992	588 rue paradis		Henri Verneuil	
1992	L'homme de ma vie	Arlette	Jean-Charles Tacchella	
1993	Mayrig		Henri Verneuil	TV mini-series
1993	L'instit	Donatienne	Jacques Ertaud	TV series (1 episode)
1995	Oui	The cup-and-ball player	Pascal Perennes	
1996	My Man	Woman In Shawl	Bertrand Blier	
1996	Les Bidochon	Madame Bordel	Serge Korber	
1996	Men, Women: A User's Manual		Claude Lelouch	
1996	Dans un grand vent de fleurs	Honorade Beauval	Gérard Vergez	TV mini-series
1997	Les petites bonnes	Germaine	Serge Korber	TV movie
1997	Maigret	Denise	Pierre Granier-Deferre	TV series (1 episode)
1999	Ces messieurs de la maréchaussée		Emmanuel Rigaut	Short
1999	La vie comme un dimanche	Sister Louise	Roger Guillot	TV movie
1999	Jean-Baptiste, homme de coeur	Adèle	Jean-Pierre Vergne	TV series (1 episode)
2000	Deuxième vie	Henriette	Patrick Braoudé	
2000	L'avocate	Madame Carton	Alain Nahum	TV series (1 episode)
2000	Chercheur d'héritiers	Manou	Williams Crépin	TV series (1 episode)
2001	Mauvais genres	Louisette Vincent	Francis Girod	
2001	Entre deux rails	Marguerite	Claire Jeanteur	Short
2001	Boss of Bosses	Édith Lieuwen	Claude-Michel Rome	TV series (1 episode)
2001-2011	Famille d'accueil	Jeanne Ferrière	Alain Wermus, Franck Buchter, ...	TV series (48 episodes)
2002-2003	Père et maire	Madame Cotte	Marc Rivière, Marion Sarraut, ...	TV series (5 episodes)
2003	La beuze	Madame Batin	François Desagnat & Thomas Sorriaux	
2003	Le don fait à Catchaires	Rose	William Gotesman	TV movie
2004	Les Dalton	Ma James	Philippe Haïm	
2005	Terre de sang	Yvonne Le Dantec	Nicolas Guillou	
2005	Une belle histoire		Philippe Dajoux	
2005	Retiens-moi	Madame Vannier	Jean-Pierre Igoux	TV movie
2005	La tête haute	Mother Cardinaud	Gérard Jourd'hui	TV movie
2005	Marc Eliot	Mamy Eliot	Patrick Jamain	TV series (1 episode)
2006	Concours de danse à Piriac	Marc's grandma	Marc Jolivet	TV movie
2007	Bouche à bouche		Louis Dupont	Short
2007	La boîte à images	Émilie Fargeau	Marco Pauly	TV movie
2009	Trésor	The Lady	Claude Berri & François Dupeyron	
2009	La femme invisible	Mamita	Agathe Teyssier	
2010	Famille décomposée	Noisette	Claude d'Anna	TV movie
2010	Camping paradis	Geneviève	Pascal Heylbroeck	TV series (1 episode)
2011	Léa	Isabelle	Bruno Rolland	
2011	Crimes en sourdine	Madame Garcia IV	Joël Chalude & Stéphane Onfroy	

== Theatre ==
Year	Title	Author	Director	Notes
1971	Nude with Violin	Noël Coward	Jacques-Henri Duval	
1971	Au bal des chiens	Remo Forlani	André Barsacq	
1978	Hôtel particulier	Pierre Chesnot	Raymond Rouleau	
1981	La Grande Shirley	Pierre Guénin	Yves Gasc	
1985	Émilie Jolie	Philippe Chatel	Robert Fortune	
1985	On m'appelle Émilie	Maria Pacôme	Jean-Luc Moreau	
1986	Le Nègre	Didier Van Cauwelaert	Pierre Boutron	
1988	L'Inconvenant	Gildas Bourdet	Gildas Bourdet	
1989-1990	La Bonne Adresse	Marc Camoletti	Marc Camoletti	
1990	Le Clan des veuves	Ginette Garcin	François Guérin	
1994-1995	Le Clan des veuves	Ginette Garcin	François Guérin	
1996	Have You Any Dirty Washing, Mother Dear?	Clive Exton	Jean-Luc Moreau	
1997	Le Passe-muraille	Marcel Aymé	Alain Sachs	Nominated - Molière Award for Best Supporting Actress
2000	Ma mère avait raison	Ginette Garcin	Gérard Chevalier	
2001	Mistinguett, la dernière revue	Franklin Le Naour & Jérôme Savary	Jérôme Savary	
2002	Au soleil	Vincent Scotto	André Bernard	
2006	Le Clan des veuves	Ginette Garcin	Édouard Pretet	
2008-2009	Monique est demandée en caisse 12	Raphaël Mezrahi	Philippe Sohier	
2010	Monique est toujours demandée en caisse 12	Raphaël Mezrahi	Philippe Sohier	
