= Jérôme Bellay =

- Born: 10 October 1942 (age 83); Châlons-en-Champagne
- Occupation: Journalist
- Employer(s): Radio France; L'Union; ORTF; Télé Lyon Métropole; LCI
- Spouses: Karen Cheryl (since 2002); Isabelle Quenin

Jérôme Bellay (pseudonym of Dominique Quenin; born on 10 October 1942, in Châlons-sur-Marne (Marne)) is a French journalist and press executive.

== Early life and education ==
Jérôme Bellay wanted to become a film director. In his final year of high school, he did an internship at a daily newspaper in Reims.

== Career ==
In 1961, after working at L'Union in Reims, he joined the ORTF in 1965 where he became a correspondent in Cayenne, then the editor-in-chief of ORTF Normandie-Caen.

In 1981, he was appointed director of information at Radio France. In 1987, he founded France Info with Roland Faure.

In 1990, he joined TLM before becoming the editor-in-chief of Le Quotidien de Paris (Groupe Quotidien), chaired by Philippe Tesson. In 1992 he had a stint at La Cinq before joining Radio Monte-Carlo.

In 1994, he founded LCI with Christian Dutoit. In 1996, he became the president of Europe 1, where he applied the concept of News and Talk, based on information and debates on current affairs. He was removed in 2005, on the eve of the French referendum on the Treaty establishing a Constitution for Europe, and was replaced by Jean-Pierre Elkabbach. He was also the president of the Santé Vie channel from May 2000 to July 2002.

Starting in September 2000, Jérôme Bellay was the president of Maximal Productions and producer of the daily debate program C dans l'air presented by Yves Calvi on France 5, and @ la carte presented by Valérie Durier on France 3. On 27 October 2011, Maximal Productions broadcast the televised address of the President of the Republic on "the crisis in the euro zone," based on an original idea by Jérôme Bellay.

In July 2011 he was appointed director of Le Journal du Dimanche (JDD) editorial staff. In October 2015, a headline in the JDD about Marine Le Pen caused controversy. At the end of May 2016, he announced his departure from his position as director of the JDD and head of Maximal Productions.

In October 2021, he was once again appointed director of the JDD editorial staff, replacing Hervé Gattegno. This decision sparked controversy, with several executives at Vivendi seeing the influence of Vincent Bolloré and even an attempt by him to "de-Macronize" the newspaper to better align it with his political agenda. In January 2022, he was replaced by Jérôme Béglé as head of the newspaper.

== Personal life ==
He has been married to Claire Mugnier-Pollet, Isabelle Quenin, and Édith Simonnet. Since 2001, he has been married to Isabelle Morizet (who was a variety artist under the pseudonym Karen Cheryl).

== Selected works ==
- Le Seigneur des dos-pelés (1979)
- Le Chercheur d'opale (1983)
- L'Ultime Sacrilège (2007)
- Entre les lignes ou le journaliste assassiné (2008)
- Le bal des pompiers (2014)
