= Juliette and Juliette =

- Directed by: Rémo Forlani
- Written by: Rémo Forlani; Jacqueline Voulet
- Produced by: Jacques Dorfmann; Annie Girardot
- Starring: Annie Girardot; Marlène Jobert; Pierre Richard
- Cinematography: Jean Collomb
- Edited by: Chantal Rémy
- Music by: Paul Misraki
- Production company: Belstar Productions
- Distributed by: SN Prodis
- Release date: 27 February 1974
- Running time: 90 minutes
- Countries: France; Italy
- Language: French

Juliette and Juliette (French: Juliette et Juliette) is a 1974 French-Italian comedy film directed by Rémo Forlani and starring Annie Girardot, Marlène Jobert and Pierre Richard.

== Cast ==
- Annie Girardot as Juliette Vidal
- Marlène Jobert as Juliette Rozenec
- Pierre Richard as Bob Rozenec
- Alfred Adam as Monsieur Rozenec
- Robert Beauvais as Pénélope's boss
- Dominique Briand as Laurent
- Paulette Dubost as Madame Rozenec
- Ginette Garcin as Miss Quiblier
- Christine Dejoux as Nicole
- Philippe Léotard as The seducer

== Bibliography ==
- Dayna Oscherwitz & MaryEllen Higgins. The A to Z of French Cinema. Scarecrow Press, 2009.
