= Nathalie Simard =

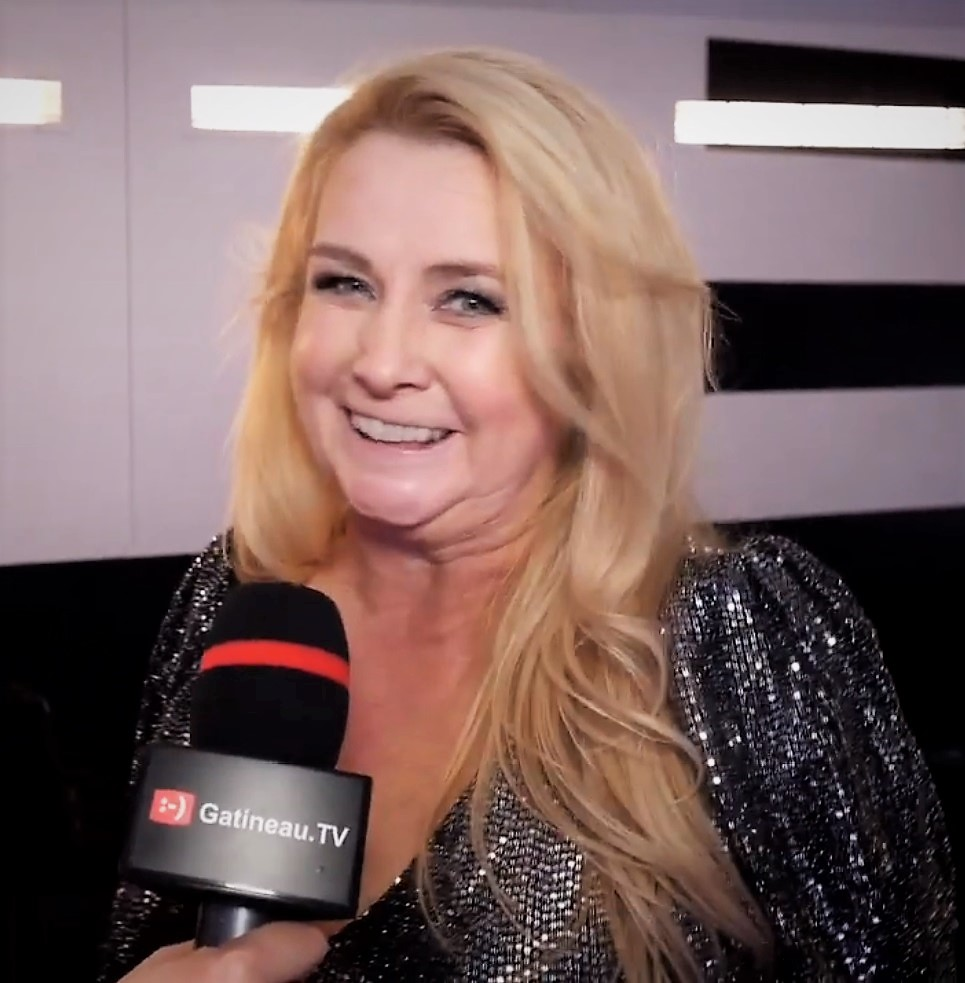
- Simard interviewed in 2019

Background information
- Born: 7 July 1969 (age 56); Île d'Orléans, Quebec, Canada
- Years active: 1971–present

Nathalie Simard (born 7 July 1969) is a pop singer from Quebec, Canada, and the younger sister of performer René Simard.

Simard was born in Île d'Orléans, near Quebec City, and was discovered by producer Guy Cloutier. Her first role was in a Laura Secord pudding commercial at age 2. She also appeared on some television shows, the first being Le Village de Nathalie, a children's TV show where she wore a princess dress. She also hosted Les Mini-Stars de Nathalie.

== Abuse ==
Simard revealed she had been sexually abused by Cloutier since 1980. She sued him and his company Productions Guy Cloutier (PGC), for more than $1.2 million, but settled out of court. Cloutier was convicted of criminal charges in 2004 regarding this assault and that of another unidentified child. He subsequently received a 3.5-year prison term.

Michel Vastel's biography on Simard, Briser le Silence (Breaking the Silence), was published in 2005 (ISBN 978-2764802434) amid controversy. Vastel blasted Radio-Canada for continuing to work on television programs with Cloutier through his new company, Novem Communications. The book also charged René Simard with mishandling his sister's finances when he was her legal guardian, and with attempting to bribe her to keep details of Cloutier's abuses from the public. René Simard responded to these claims with a news conference denying details of Vastel's account.

== Curtailed comeback ==
Simard curtailed a tour for the 2007 album Il y avait un jardin, her first album since the 1990s. She announced that she would leave the entertainment industry and move with her daughter to the Dominican Republic to escape scrutiny by the media after performing a final Montreal concert in April 2008. The Nathalie Simard Foundation, which she established in 2005 to assist sexually abused children, was also shut down. Following this cancellation, a $2.3 million lawsuit was filed against Simard and her production company in April 2008 claiming a loss of expected tour profits. Two additional lawsuits were also active as Yves Campeau sought $38,000 while her former manager Éric Dubois sought $60,000. Both Campeau and Dubois were reportedly ex-boyfriends of Simard.

== Discography ==
- Le temps des fêtes chez la famille Simard à l'Ile d'Orléans (with other members of the Simard family), 1972
- 18 ans déjà (René Simard album where she sings on "Tous les enfants du monde" and "Noël des enfants"), 1979
- Joyeux Noël...Nathalie, 1979
- Nathalie chante pour ses amis, 1980
- Nathalie Simard (Je n'aurais jamais dû partir), 1980
- Un Noël blanc (with other artists; 2 new songs), 1980
- La Rentrée...Nathalie, 1981
- Noël avec Nathalie et les Petits Chanteurs de Granby, 1981 See also D'où viens-tu, bergère?
- Nathalie Simard (Ouvre-moi la porte), 1982
- 20 souvenirs de Noël René et Nathalie (compilation), 1982
- René et Nathalie Sur la plage (compilation with 2 new songs), 1983
- René et Nathalie en concert (1982 concert), 1983
- Comment ça va (René Simard album where she sings on "Fais pas la gueule au Bon Dieu"), 1983
- Animauville, 1983
- Nostalgie de Noël (compilation with other artists), 1983
- Chante avec Nathalie (Monsieur Fred Hamster), 1984
- Chante et raconte La Guerre des tuques, 1984
- Joyeuses Fêtes René & Nathalie (compilation), 1984
- J'ai rencontré le Père Noël, 1984 (Quebec Version)
- Nathalie Simard (Mes amis les calinours), 1985
- 15 Grands Succès de Nathalie (compilation), 1985
- Noël sous la neige (compilation, with other artists), 1985
- Le Village de Nathalie vol.1: 'la lettre d'amour', 1986
- Le Village de Nathalie vol.2 (12 new songs), 1986
- Le Village de Nathalie vol.3: 'Le Noël de Saute-Flocon', 1986
- La Fugue du petit poucet (Le lapin qui peint; music for children with other artists) Paris, 1986
- Noël d'antan (with other artists, compilation with new songs), 1986
- Nathalie Simard: édition spéciale, promotional cassette for Smarties
- Joyeux Noël à tous les enfants (compilation with one new song), 1987
- René - Nathalie Simard (Tout si tu m'aimes), 1988
- Au maximum, 1991
- Parole de femme, 1994
- Demain matin Montréal m'attend (with other artists), 1995
- René et Nathalie, collection 25 ans de carrière (compilation), 1996
- Une femme ...Un enfant; Nathalie (compilation with one new song), 1997
- Les coups d'coeur de Décibel (theme song of the TV show), 1999
- Il y avait un jardin, 2007
- Nathalie et Régis chantent Noël, 2011
- Je veux vivre, 2019

== Television ==
- Le Village de Nathalie (1985–1988) - TVA
- Les mini-stars de Nathalie (1988–1990) - TVA
- Décibel (1999–2000)
- Le petit monde de Laura Cadieux : Thérèse

== Filmography ==
- Un enfant comme les autres - 1972
- J'ai Rencontré Le Père Noël - 1984 (Quebec Version)
- North Station (Station Nord) - 2002
- Thieves of innocence, Les voleurs d'enfance - 2005, documentary
