= Daniel Bilalian =

French journalist (1947–2025)

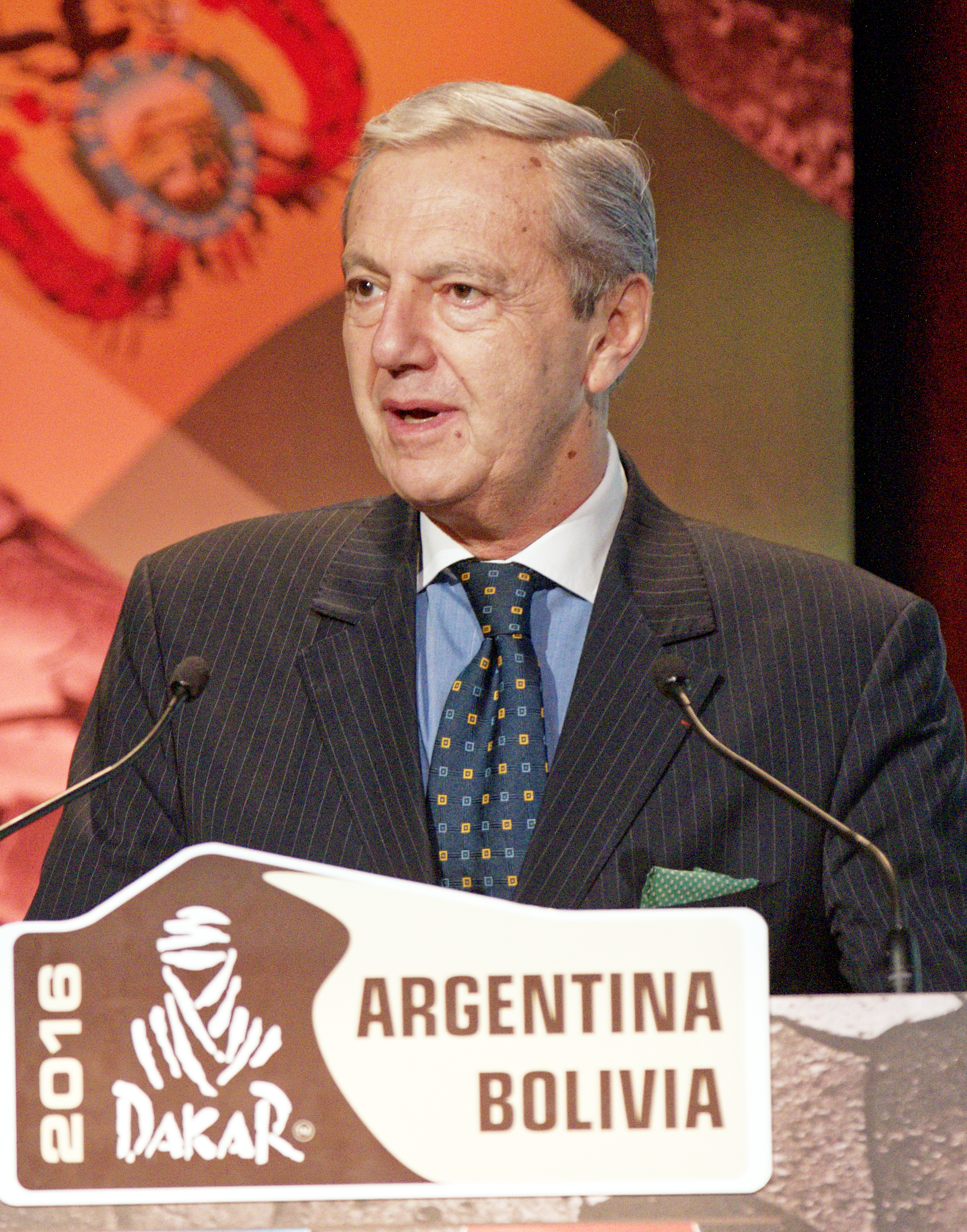
- Bilalian in 2016
- Born: 10 April 1947; Paris, France
- Died: 14 May 2025 (aged 78); Paris, France
- Occupation(s): Journalist, news anchor, television presenter
- Years active: 1968–2016
- Television: Antenne 2 (1975–1991); France 2 (1994–2004)

Daniel Bilalian (10 April 1947 – 14 May 2025) was a French journalist, news anchor and television presenter. He presented for Antenne 2, which was later renamed France 2. During his tenure at the channel, he presented many different shows from 1976 to 1991 and from 1994 to 2004. In 2004, he became the sports director of France Télévisions. In 2016, he ceased appearing on television and became a municipal councillor for Neuilly-sur-Seine.

== Life and career ==
Daniel Bilalian was born in Paris on 10 April 1947, to an Armenian father, Krikor Bilalian, and a French mother, Maria Culliver. His father, an Armenian farmer, was orphaned by the Armenian genocide and fled Turkish-controlled Armenia during it, becoming a refugee in France in the late 1920s. Initially working as a farm laborer and then as an apprentice with a fellow Armenian, he eventually established a tailoring shop with his wife, Maria Cuvillier, a Frenchwoman from the Pas-de-Calais region. Naturalized as a French citizen in 1945 by General Charles de Gaulle for "services rendered," Krikor became deeply integrated into French society. "Passionate about politics", he inspired his son's path toward journalism.

He attended Lycée Jacques-Decour and Cours Vauvenargues in Paris for school. After studying law at the University of Lille, he became a journalist at the L'Union de Reims. Beginning in 1971, he was a regional correspondent for the ORTF, before joining the national editing staff of Antenne 2, where he became a main reporter before presenting Antenne 2 midi. He presented some daily news in 1976.

He presented the Journal de 13 heures from 1979 to 1981 and went back to Antenne 2 midi in 1982 before he alternated presenting the Journal de 20 heures with Bernard Rapp in 1985. He was then replaced by Claude Sérillon. After being absent for two years, he came back in 1987 to present the daily news on weekends until 1990. He also presented Stars à la barre and then Dossiers de l'écran, retitled Mardi Soir, until 1991.

He returned to presenting the daily news on France 2 in 1994 on the Journal de 13 heures. In September 1995, he became the presenter of the Journal de 20 heures. After his departure from this post in September 1997, he presented the daily news during the week. He was replaced by Claude Sérillon in August 1998. After an absence, he came back once again to present the Journal de 13 heures from September 2001 to July 2004.

In July 2004, he was named sports director of France Télévisions. In 2005, the ouster of Pierre Salviac surprised the rugby section of the sports service, and in 2009 one of its successors. In January 2010, the sports journalists challenged the changes to the editorial and management methods that were judged dangerous. In April 2010, the majority voted no confidence against him, reporting his management and reproaching him for not working on the editing. In 2016, he caused controversy with comments he made during the 2016 Summer Olympics opening ceremony. In October 2016, he stopped appearing on television and moved to Neuilly-sur-Seine, where he became a municipal councilor.

== Personal life and death ==
Bilalian married Christine de Précigout on 14 January 1971, with whom he had a daughter. He then divorced Christine and married Frédérique Renimel in 2020.

Bilalian died on 14 May 2025, at the age of 78.

== Bibliography ==
- Presses de la Cité, ed. (1998). Prisons, la vérité (in French). Presses de la Cité. p. 214. ISBN 9782258017290.
- Presses de la Cité, ed. (1979). Les évadés (in French). Presses de la Cité. p. 267. ISBN 9782258005181.
- Presses de la Cité, ed. (1985). Le camp de la goutte d'eau (in French). Presses de la Cité. p. 211. ISBN 9782258007093.
- Pocket, ed. (1988). Vous serez le nouveau président (in French). Presses pocket. p. 274. ISBN 9782266021111.

== Distinctions ==
In July 2005, Bilalian was honoured with the Chevalier de la Légion d'honneur.

== See also ==
- List of newsreaders and journalists in France
