= Claude Sérillon =

French journalist and television presenter

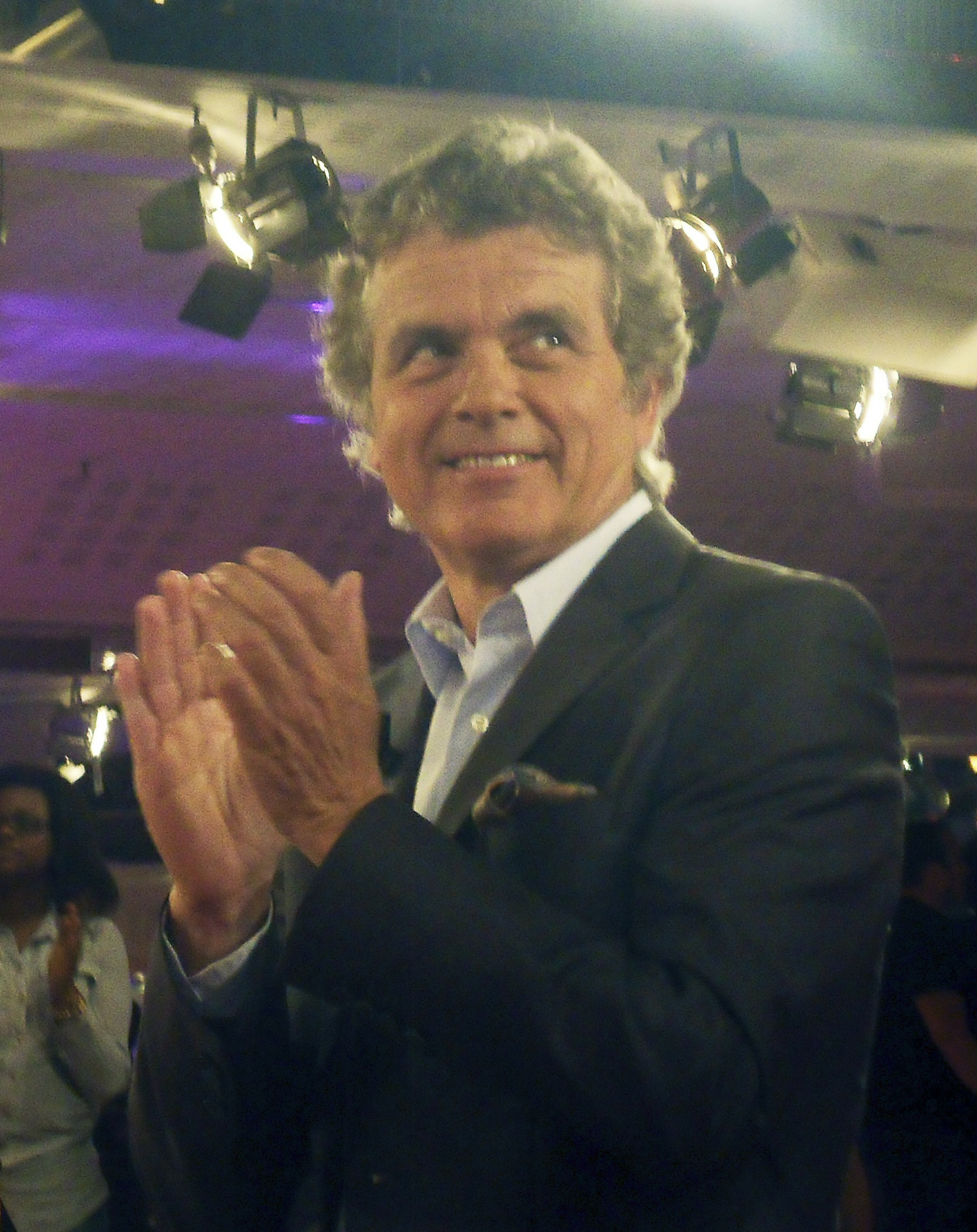
- Claude Sérillon in 2010.
- Born: 20 October 1950 (age 75); Nantes, France
- Education: Lycée Jules-Verne
- Alma mater: University of Nantes
- Occupations: Journalist, television presenter, writer
- Years active: 1970-2014
- Known for: Le journal de 20 heures (France 2 then TF1); Géopolis,

Claude Sérillon (French pronunciation: [klod seʁijɔ̃]; born 20 October 1950 in Nantes), is a French journalist and TV presenter.

== Biography ==
Claude Sérillon was a student at the school of Breil-Malville and then at Jules Verne high school; he did his graduate studies in letters at the University of Nantes, obtaining a Bachelor's degree. While still a student, he started working in journalism in 1970 as a freelancer for the newspaper Presse-Océan. His work for this newspaper started on the occasion of a trip to Norway where he proposed a story about the football club Strømsgodset IF, champions of Norway in 1970, that the FCN (FC Nantes) was scheduled to meet later in the European Cup. Later, in the afternoon of 28 January 1972, during his journalism work, he found himself at the Saint-Pierre square when a fire started in the Nantes Cathedral; he was the first journalist at the scene, following the fire-fighters right to the fire in the attic of the building, and his report was an essential part of the paper the next day, the first page only contained a picture of the fire and the words "16 hours 19 ".

=== Television ===
In 1973 he joined the ORTF Ile-de-France. He started work at TV station Antenne 2 in 1975 and took control of the news show at 18:45 the following year, from 1976 up to 1979.

In 1979 he was in charge of the press review at Antenne 2 Midi and is commended for reporting of the diamond affair of Jean-Bédel Bokassa, involving Valéry Giscard d'Estaing.

He started editing again in July 1981, as editor of the society department, and he also started presenting Journal de 20 heures in summer 1982.

In February 1984 he left Antenne 2 for TF1 where he presented their Journal de 20 heures. His work there then stalled against the tandem of rival TV presenter team Christine Ockrent / Bernard Rapp.

Uncomfortable with the editing of TF1 and opposed to the style of the news show they put on the air in January 1985, which was dramatized and sensationalized, he remained nostalgic for channel A2 and eventually returned to his earlier employ in January 1986 to present the 20 hours alternating with Bernard Rapp

He was dropped from the 20 heures news show in July 1987 for having "abused" the chief of police of Paris in the Malik Oussekine case. Claude Sérillon would wait 11 years to return to the same post in August 1998 when he replaced Daniel Bilalian.

During the 1992 Winter Olympics, in Albertville, he hosted some "talk shows" with Daniel Cazal on the temporary Euro HD channel, set up by the l'ORTO 92 (established by the French TV public channels to promote HDTV format Mac HD broadcast in D2MAC).

However, he remained true to Antenne 2 during his lean years and worked on several broadcasts of reports and debates, which were called Place publique (directed by Serge Moati,), Raison de plus or Géopolis. He also copresented for ten years Telethon and Nuits des étoiles alongside Hubert Reeves. During one telethon broadcast, while interviewing Michel Boujenah who was telling incredible stories, Claude Sérillon became known for a very crazy laugh.

=== France 2 ===
17 August 1998, he took the reins of 20 heures on France 2, where he then proposed a revamped news journal show, but the ratings were nevertheless lower than those of channel 1.

On 13 September 1999, true to his reputation for independence, he made an interview without concession of Lionel Jospin then Prime minister, which was severely criticized. With the Presidential campaign approaching, Sérillon, as in 1987, became an interviewer "boudé à gauche et peu apprécié à droite" (snubbed by the Left and little appreciated by the Right). On 12 July 2001 he stopped doing the news show, and, Olivier Mazerolle, the new boss of news at the channel, retired Claude from the show. In September, he was replaced by David Pujadas, who had just left LCI.

Thereafter, he left France 2 and then found his full freedom of speech. In 2002, Patrick Chêne appealed to him for his revitalization project of the TV channel Santé Vie but this channel stopped transmitting a year later.

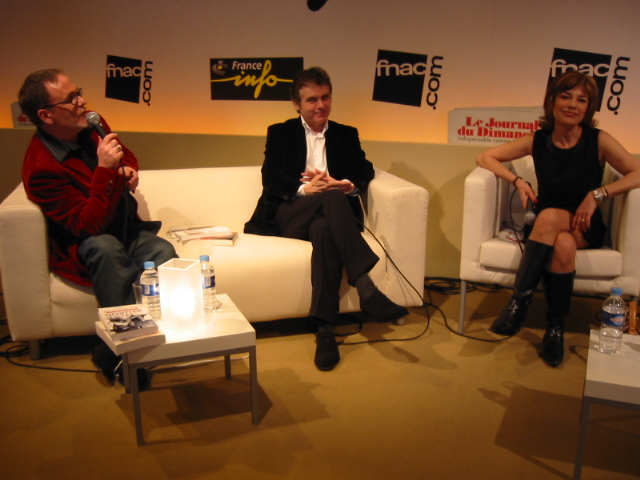
Claude Sérillon (center) during the Paris Book Fair in 2004.

From 2007 to 2012 he was part of the team of Michel Drucker as a columnist in the second part of the show Vivement dimanche prochain on France 2 to present on the latest films and literary events. He left the show, declaring in September 2012 that he wanted to spend his time on new projects.

Since 2007, he has co-presented the weekly political show Ôtrement dit broadcast on France Ô and on radio and television at RFO in the Overseas departments with Dominique Roederer.

=== The 2010s ===
In January 2009 he publicly announced his candidacy for the presidency of the Public Sénat parliamentary channel. He thus found himself facing Pierre Sled, Thierry Guerrier, Gilles Leclerc and Ghislain Achard. In the third round, he found himself against the candidate Gilles Leclerc, then head of the political department of writing at France 2. On 28 April, Gérard Larcher, Senate President, announced that there were now two candidates for the presidency of Public Sénat. After a long selection process began early in March, led by a selection committee of the Senate, Gilles Leclerc was finally named president of the parliamentary channel Public Senat on 29 April 2009 by Gérard Larcher.

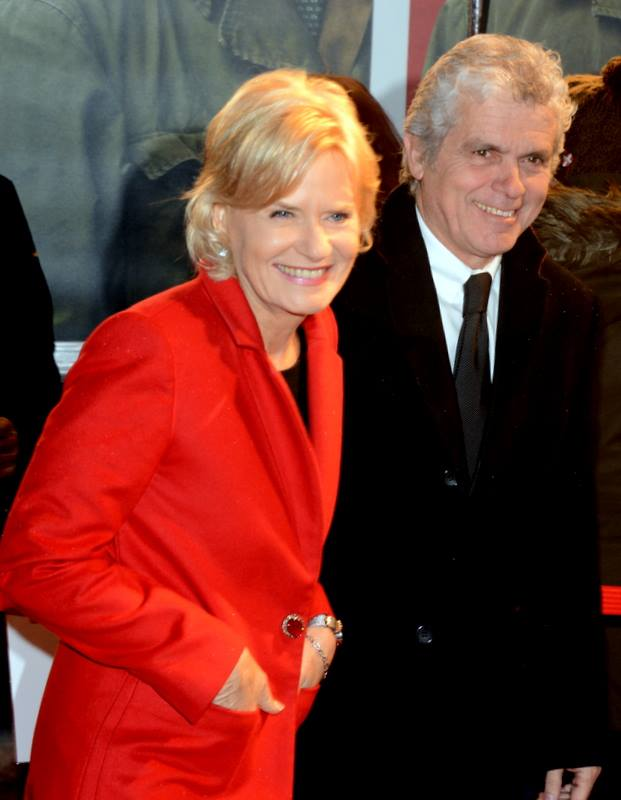
Claude and his companion Sérillon Catherine Ceylac in February 2014.

Claude Sérillon became part of the communications team of Francois Hollande, (candidate of the Socialist Party for the 2012 French presidential election, who was elected President of the Republic on 6 May 2012). On 3 January 2013, Claude was named advisor to the President of the Republic, to strengthen the communication service of the Elysee, qualified as a spin doctor of l'Élysée by the media. In early February 2014, his mission evolved and became focused on the Elysee website. On 10 June 2014, Le Monde and Europe 1 announced the end of his mission serving the head of state. His resignation became effective 16 July of the same year.

== Programs presented ==
=== Television presenter ===
- 1976–1979 : Journal de 18h45 (Antenne 2)
- 1982 : Journal de 20 heures (Antenne 2)
- 1984–1985 : Journal de 20 heures (TF1)
- 1986–1987 : Journal de 20 heures (Antenne 2)
- 1987–1990 : Haute Curiosité (Antenne 2)
- 1987–1996 : Téléthon (Antenne 2) et (France 2)
- 1988–1989 : Edition spéciale (Antenne 2)
- 1988–1991 : Les Dossiers de l'écran (Antenne 2)
- 1989 : Place publique (Antenne 2)
- 1990 : Une fois par Jour (Antenne 2)
- 1991–2001 : La Nuit des étoiles (Antenne 2) et (France 2)
- 1992 : Résistances (Antenne 2)
- 1992 : Raison de plus (Antenne 2)
- 1992–1996, 1999–2001 : Géopolis (France 2)
- 1996–1997 : C'est à suivre... (France 2)
- 1998–2001 : Journal de 20 heures (France 2)
- 2001 : Rendez-vous politiques du jeudi (France 2)
- 2002–2003 : Bistouri (Santé Vie)
- 2007–2008 : Ôtrement dit (France Ô)

=== chronicler ===
- 2007–2012 : Vivement dimanche prochain (France 2)

== Publications ==
- De quoi je me mêle (essai), Balland, 1987.
- Un certain sentiment d'injustice, avec Jean-Louis Pelletier, 1988.
- Le Bureau (roman), Lattès, 1996.
- Une femme coupable (roman), Grasset et Fasquelle, 1999.
- Dis-moi je t'aime (nouvelles), Balland, 2004.
- Le Cap et la Route, entretiens avec Jean Glavany, Éditions Privat, 2005.
- Tu dors ? Non je rêve (nouvelles), Éditions du Panama, 2006.
- Les Années 70, avec Blandine Houdart, Laura Cuisset et Clara Engel, Éditions du Chêne, 2006.
- Les Années 80, Éditions du Chêne, 2006.
- Les Années 90, Éditions du Chêne, 2007.
- Les Mots de l'Actu, Éditions Marabout, 2009.
- Dire du mal, Éditions Descartes & Cie, 2015.
