= Clothilde (musician) =

French singer

- Birth name: Élisabeth Beauvais
- Also known as: Clothilde
- Born: February 22, 1948 (age 77)
- Origin: France
- Genres: Yé-yé
- Occupation: Singer
- Years active: 1967

Clothilde (pseudonym of Élisabeth Beauvais; born February 22, 1948) is a French singer who was active for a brief period in 1967. She is the daughter of writer and broadcaster Robert Beauvais and actress Gisèle Parry.

Clothilde recorded only two 45 rpm records in 1967 with words written by Jean-Yves Gaillac to music orchestrated by Germinal Tenas. Her material was re-released in 2013 by Born Bad Records.

== Discography ==
- 1967, Disques Vogue EPL 8528: Fallait pas écraser la queue du chat / Je t'ai voulu et je t'ai bien eu / La Chanson bête et méchante / Le Boa
- 1967, Disques Vogue EPL 8567: Saperlipopette (Bleuet et chiendent) / 102, 103 / La Ballade du bossu / La Vérité, toute la vérité
- 2013, Born Bad Records: Fallait Pas Écraser La Queue Du Chat / Je T'ai Voulu Et Je T'ai Bien Eu / La Chanson Bête Et Méchante / Le Boa / Saperlipopette (Bleuet Et Chiendent) / La Ballade Du Bossu / 102 - 103 / La Vérité, Toute La Vérité / Des Garçons Faciles / A Ora Sos'e / Qualcosa Che Non Va
