= Roland Faure =

French journalist (1926–2023)

- Born: Roland Victor Maurice Faure-Geors; October 10, 1926; Montélimar (Drôme)
- Died: February 25, 2023 (aged 96); Paris
- Occupations: Journalist, press magnate

Roland Faure, born on October 10, 1926 in Montélimar (Drôme) and died on February 25, 2023 in Paris, was a French journalist, press magnate, and executive of audiovisual companies.

== Biography ==
Roland Faure founded the Journal français du Brésil in Rio de Janeiro (1952-1953), served as editor-in-chief of L'Aurore, and was director of Toutes les nouvelles de Versailles.

From 1979 to 1981, he was the director of information at Radio France. He then created and directed Canal Versailles Stéréo (CVS) from 1982 to 1986. As President-Director General of Radio France from 1986 to 1989, he co-created France Info in 1987 with Jérôme Bellay, replacing Radio 7, the youth radio station of Radio France.

He was also a member of the Conseil supérieur de l'audiovisuel from January 1989, when the institution was created, until January 1997.

== Publications ==
- Brésil dernière heure, publisher André Martel, 1954.

== Decorations ==
- Commandeur de la Légion d'honneur
- Officier de l'ordre national du Mérite
- Commandeur de l'ordre des Arts et des Lettres
- Médaille de la jeunesse, des sports et de l'engagement associatif, or

== Sources ==
- Robert Prot, Dictionnaire de la radio, Presses universitaires de Grenoble/ INA, 1997 ISBN 978-2-7061-0762-7.
