= J'ai rencontré le Père Noël =

- Directed by: Christian Gion
- Written by: Christian Gion; Didier Kaminka
- Produced by: Patrick Delauneux
- Starring: Karen Cheryl; Armand Meffre; Emeric Chapuis
- Cinematography: Jacques Assuérus
- Edited by: Pauline Leroy
- Music by: Francis Lai
- Production companies: Holiday Films; Lapaca Productions
- Distributed by: Acteurs auteurs associés
- Release date: 5 December 1984
- Running time: 78 minutes
- Country: France
- Language: French

J'ai rencontré le Père Noël (English: I met Santa Claus) is a 1984 French musical science fiction fantasy film directed by Christian Gion and co-written with Didier Kaminka. It stars Karen Cheryl, who was a popular singer at that time in France, as both the schoolteacher and as the Fairy. She acts and sings musical numbers in the film, an opportunity for Cheryl to repeatedly sing simple melodies, in line with the plot.

== Plot ==
Simon is a young boy, bullied at school by peers and adults alike. His parents have been kidnapped in Africa, and the government has not responded to the ultimatum set by the kidnappers. Therefore, while on a field trip to the local airport, Simon and his friend Élodie sneak onto a jet liner and fly to Rovaniemi to visit Santa Claus in Lapland, to ask him to save Simon's parents. On the way, they encounter a fairy and an ogre.

The two children arrive safely to travel to Lapland then Santa and the fairy teleport to Africa near the village where the parents are inmates, and finally the two children returned home and rushed to the Christmas Mass where no one seems really surprised they reappear after their prolonged absence.

== Cast ==
- Karen Cheryl as Schoolteacher / Fairy
  - Nathalie Simard provided the Quebec Version dub for Cheryl's role.
- Armand Meffre as Le Père Noël
- Emeric Chapuis as Simon
  - Chris Davenport provided the English dub for Simon.
- Alexia Haudot (credited as Little Alexia) as Élodie
- Jeanne Herviale as Simon's grandmother
- Dominique Hulin as Ogre
- Hélène Ruby as Simon's mother
- Jean-Louis Foulquier as Simon's father
- Baye Fall as Bouake

== Soundtrack ==
The musical score is composed by Francis Lai, with lyrics by Pierre-Andre Dousset. A soundtrack was released on LP (WEA 74320 06) on 7 June 1984. The first edition was recalled due to Karen Cheryl having not asked permission from her producer (Ibach) to appear in the film or sing for the soundtrack. The disc was reissued with the same cover but with singer Tilda (then Tilda Rejwan) in Cheryl's place. In Quebec, Nathalie Simard dubbed over the songs.

No.	Title	Writer(s)	Artist	Length
1.	"J'ai rencontré le Père Noël (Générique)" (English title: "I met Santa Claus (Credits)")	Lai	Lai	4:27
2.	"On s'prépare pour Noël" (English title: "Getting ready for Christmas")	Lai, Dousset	Tilda/Nathalie Simard (Quebec Version)	1:41
3.	"L'Arrivée à Rovaniemi" (English title: "Arrival in Rovaniemi")	Lai	Lai	1:51
4.	"Oui, le Père Noël existe" (English title: "Yes, Santa Claus exists")	Lai, Dousset	Tilda/Nathalie Simard (Quebec Version)	1:36
5.	"La classe" (English title: "The class")	Lai	Lai	1:41
6.	"P'tit pomme sur le pommier" (English title: "Little apple on the apple tree")	Lai, Dousset	Tilda/Nathalie Simard (Quebec Version)	2:29
7.	"Noël en Laponie" (English title: "Christmas in Lapland")	Lai	Lai	4:15
8.	"L'Usine à Jouets" (English title: "The Toy Factory")	Lai, Dousset	Tilda/Nathalie Simard (Quebec Version)	2:37
9.	"Ballade pour une Fée" (English title: "Ballad for a Fairy")	Lai	Lai	2:30
10.	"La Recherche en Afrique" (English title: "Research in Africa")	Lai	Lai	2:20
11.	"Lutins, trains, vilains" (English title: "Elves, trains, villains")	Lai	Lai	2:45
12.	"Noël, un Enfant" (English title: "Christmas, a child")	Lai, Dousset	Tilda/Nathalie Simard (Quebec Version)	4:23
13.	"J'ai rencontré le Père Noël (Générique de Fin)" (English title: "I met Santa Claus (End Credits)")	Lai	Lai	4:23

== Release ==
The film was dubbed in English by New World Pictures and retitled as Here Comes Santa Claus. It has also been released on DVD by Image Entertainment under the title I Believe in Santa Claus. It is also available on Amazon Prime for free.

== Legacy ==
The film, credited as I Believe in Santa Claus, saw re-release as a video on demand title with comedic commentary by RiffTrax, the alumni project of former Mystery Science Theater 3000 members Michael J. Nelson, Kevin Murphy and Bill Corbett.

== See also ==
- List of Christmas films
- Santa Claus in film
