= Fallait pas écraser la queue du chat =

"Fallait Pas Écraser La Queue Du Chat"

Single by Clothilde

from the album Fallait Pas Écraser La Queue Du Chat
- Released: 1967
- Genre: Yé-yé
- Label: Disques Vogue
- Songwriter(s): Jean-Yves Gaillac
- Producer(s): Germinal Tenas

"Fallait Pas Écraser La Queue Du Chat" (English:Should not crush thé cat's tail) is a song written by Jean-Yves Gaillac and interpreted by the French pop singer, Clothilde. The musical genre is Yé-yé and released in 1967. The song was successful in Europe, especially in France, Spain and the UK.
