= Remo Forlani =

French writer and screenwriter (1927–2009)

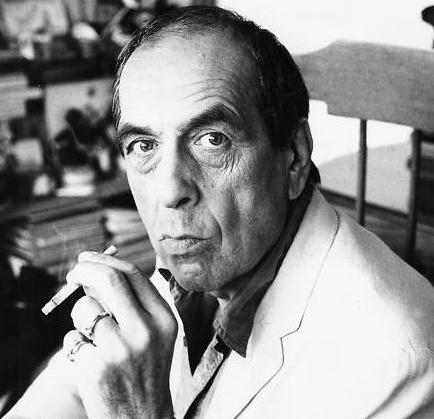
Remo Forlani,1990

Remo Forlani (1927–2009) was a French writer and screenwriter born in Paris to a French mother and an Italian immigrant father.

In 1987 he was awarded the Grand Prix du Théâtre de l'Académie française.

== Biography ==
In 1964, Remo Forlani took part in the creation of the weekly comic strip for teenagers Chouchou, created by Daniel Filipacchi following the success of the Salut les copains mascot. He wrote a series inspired by the life of Sylvie Vartan and three series for Georges Lacroix, Guy Mouminoux and Raymond Poïvet, and replaced Jean-Claude Forest as editor-in-chief from the twelfth issue at the end of April 1965, but was unable to prevent the magazine's closure two issues later.

Remo Forlani is the author of numerous books on cats and several plays.

In 1974, he took part in Coluche sketch La manifestation.

He was a film critic on RTL Télévision in the 1980s, then on the same RTL (French radio) station, notably on the program RTL Cinéma then Tous les goûts sont permis from the 1990s until June 2004, and as co-host alongside Évelyne Pagès then Isabelle Quenin from 1997.

He is then a morning Column (periodical) on Laissez-vous tenter and every Wednesday at the end of the program Les auditeurs ont la parole presented by Jérôme Godefroy.

Remo Forlani has also written song lyrics, including for the cinema.

On June 27, 1998, France Culture broadcast the documentary program Le Bon Plaisir by Remo Forlani, produced by Catherine Soullard. The program is rebroadcast on Sunday, May 20, 2018, on France Culture.

Remo Forlani is buried in Rochefort-en-Yvelines, the commune where his maternal grandmother and aunt lived, and where he spent the vacations as a child, memories he recalls at length in his 1995 book La Déglingue.

== Selected filmography ==
- Juliette and Juliette (1974)
- Avida (2006)
