= Isabelle Quenin =

French journalist

- Born: 26 September 1964

Isabelle Quenin, born on September 26, 1964, is a French radio and television journalist.

== Biography ==
Of Basque French origin on her father's side and Basque Spanish origin on her mother's side, Isabelle Quenin completed a master's degree in law at the University Paris II in 1980.

=== Radio career ===
In 1981, she began her radio career with the morning show at Radio Service Tour Eiffel. She hosted the show Matin Bulles until 1986, when the station ceased broadcasting.

In June 1987, Isabelle Quenin joined Radio France, initially at France Info, where she presented a television commentary segment before briefly moving to France Inter in January 1989. At the invitation of Ève Ruggieri, she hosted the daily show Intéressez-moi, intéressez-vous. However, Pierre Bouteiller, the new station director, did not approve and assigned her a weekly show, Secrets de stars, before she was let go in September 1990.

In 1995, Philippe Labro, director of RTL, hired her to replace Didier Derlich, who was ill. From October 9, 1995, until 1997, Isabelle Quenin hosted La vie, c'est la vie, the afternoon show on RTL. She then left to launch a magazine.

In 1997, she took over from Évelyne Pagès to co-host the Saturday afternoon RTL Cinéma with Remo Forlani, and later RTL Cinéma le jeu. The show became Tous les goûts sont permis in 2001, with Isabelle Quenin joined by various contributors: Patricia Beucher for gardening, Remo Forlani for cinema, Antony Martin for music, and Robert Longechal and others for DIY. The show was replaced in September 2004 by J'aime beaucoup ce que vous faites, still hosted by her.

From February 5 to June 2002, she presented the weekly magazine Éclats de vie from 14:30 to 16:30, replacing Valérie Bénaïm who was on maternity leave. The show became C'est la vie during the 2002–2003 season. Isabelle Quenin would invite guests and personalities to discuss current topics in a live one-hour show. Starting September 2002, still at RTL, while hosting the afternoons, she also presented the evening society magazine Ma nuit au poste.

At RTL, Isabelle Quenin occasionally appeared on Les Grosses Têtes by Philippe Bouvard. Her two RTL shows ended in June 2006, and she hosted several promotional segments at Radio Monop' in stores for Monoprix.

In August 2008, Isabelle Quenin joined Europe 1 to host two segments: Les clefs de la maison on Saturdays and Quelqu'un de bien on Sundays. In December 2008, she replaced Isabelle Martinet in the daily segment Coup de pouce, which became Code barre in 2009 at 6:49am, and a "consumption" segment in Le grand direct de l'actu hosted by Jean-Marc Morandini. These segments lasted until 2013.

During the 2016–2017 season, she co-hosted a morning health show with Dr. Gérald Kierzek. During the 2017–2018 season, she hosted a daily afternoon show called La Vie devant soi on Europe 1.

=== Television career ===
She began her television career at TF1 alongside Christophe Dechavanne in the show Ciel, mon mardi!, and from September 1991 to June 1994, she co-hosted with Jean-Pierre Pernaut on TF1 the monthly magazine Combien ça coûte?.

From June 1992 to August 1995, she replaced Evelyne Dheliat on TF1 presenting the daily segment À vrai dire on shopping, sponsored by Intermarché and Les Mousquetaires. The short program aired just before the 13:00 news presented by Jean-Pierre Pernaut on weekdays and Claire Chazal on weekends.

From October 1994 to June 1997, she hosted and co-produced (with Christophe Dechavanne) the magazine Famille, je vous aime on the same channel, which aired in the late-night slot.

In 1998, Isabelle Quenin joined public television to present La cinquième rencontre on La Cinquième, followed in 2000 by the programs Service public and Studio conseils.

In 2000, still on public television, she was a columnist for France 3's weekly science show Pourquoi, Comment?, hosted by Sylvain Augier and Nathalie Simon.

In 2007, she returned to TF1's network to host the home-focused magazine MaisOn en parle on the channel Du côté de chez vous TV.

== Bibliography ==
- Avec Janine Casevecchie (18 November 1999). À ma place, tu ferais quoi ? (in French). Neuilly-sur-Seine: éditions Michel Lafon. p. 187. ISBN 2-84098-513-6.
