= Karen Cheryl =

French singer and actress

Isabelle Morizet
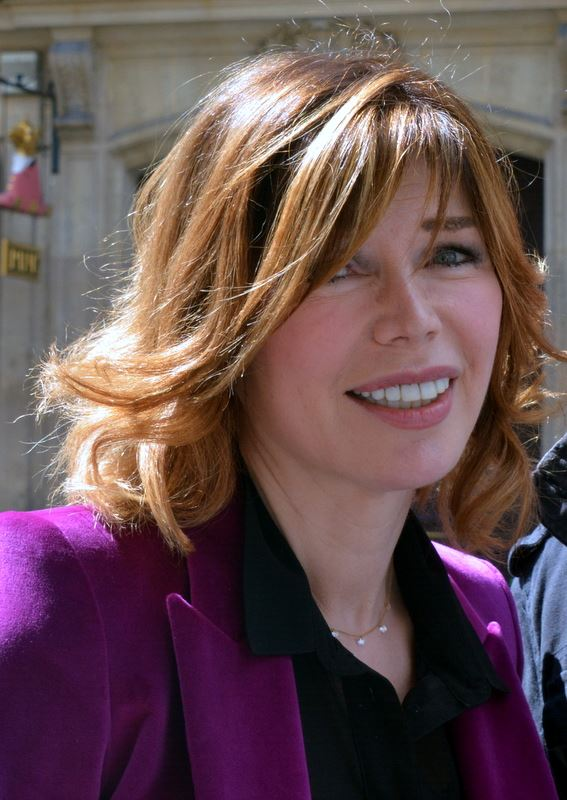
- Born: Isabelle Morizet; 19 July 1955 (age 70); Saint-Germain-en-Laye, Yvelines, France
- Occupations: Singer, actress, radio presenter, television presenter
- Years active: 1975–present
- Television: Hugo Délire (FR3); Les Délires d'Hugo (France 3)
- Height: 5 ft 4 in (1.63 m)

Isabelle Morizet (formerly Karen Cheryl on 19 July 1955) is a French singer, actress, radio and television presenter.

== Singing career ==
Karen Cheryl began her career as a singer in the 1970s and 1980s. Her first single "Garde-moi avec toi" was released in 1975 and her last one "L'Amour Fou" was released in 1991. Her first recordings were released under the name of Carene Cheryl. In 1977, she stated in the television program Le monde de l'accordéon that Carene and Cheryl were her second and third names. She later explained at an interview with Philippe Bouvard that it was a pseudonym with a better sound.

Karen Cheryl states having sold over 10 million records. It was stated on 3 November 2010 that she has sold over 25 million records. However, the different sources still remain uncertain concerning the total sales. According to the book of the Syndicat National de l'Édition Phonographique, her singles "Sing to Me Mama", "Show Me You're Man Enough", "La Marche des Machos", "Si", "Les Nouveaux Romantiques" and "Oh Chéri Chéri" have sold over 350,000 copies. According to Infodisc, Karen Cheryl has sold five million records in France in her career. She is ranked 110th of the best record sales in France before Vanessa Paradis, Whitney Houston, Nicoletta, The Black Eyed Peas and Kylie Minogue.

== Television career ==
On 2 August 1980, she presented for the first time the TV-show Numero Un, produced by French couple of TV shows producers Maritie and Gilbert Carpentier, in which she was invited as a singer but was also the host.

Numero Un, like Top à, or Embarquement Immédiat, others TV shows produced by Maritie and Gilbert Carpentier, is a show hosted by the French singers to whom the program was devoted.

In the 1980s, she began a career as a television presenter, especially programs for young audience such as Vitamine and Hugo Délire, a game show broadcast on France 3 in the 1990s. In 1995, she played the role of Karen Garnier in the television series Les Nouvelles Filles d'à côté in a hundred episodes.

In 2010, she returned on television after a radio career in the program Les Grands du Rire. She also appeared in some programs hosted by Patrick Sébastien such as Les années Bonheur. She presented a music program with Yves Lecoq and Henry-Jean Servat dedicated to Italy titled Je t'aime à l'italienne on France 3 on 24 January 2011. She presented on 22 August 2011, on the same channel Été Party 80 in the Arènes de Dax. In 2013, the program Les Grands du Rire was broadcast for another season.

== Other appearances ==
She also appeared in the 1984 Christmas film J'ai Rencontré Le Père Noël (a.k.a. I Believe in Santa Claus)

== Radio career ==
She also had a career as a radio presenter under her real name Isabelle Morizet. She even interviews herself in a fake scene of a television program on France 2. From 2001 to 2008, she interviews on Europe 1 different personalities in a program broadcast on weekend.

== Personal life ==
Karen Cheryl has a son Oscar (born in 1995) from a first relationship. In 2002, she married Jérôme Bellay, director of the radio station Europe 1. She is the sister of Sophia Morizet, who composed many of her songs.
