= Robert Lazurick =

- Born: April 3, 1896; Pantin, Seine-Saint-Denis, France
- Died: April 18, 1968; Paris, France
- Occupation(s): Lawyer, politician and newspaper proprietor

Robert Lazurick (1896–1968) was a French lawyer, politician and newspaper proprietor. He served as a member of the Chamber of Deputies from 1936 to 1941, representing Cher.

== Early life ==
Lazurick was born in Pantin on 3 April 1895 in a very modest family: his mother sold cotton cloth in local street markets, and his parents went through many sacrifices to enable their three children to attend school, since free state education didn't exist at the time. As an adolescent, he became a follower of Jean Jaurès. At 16, he launched and directed a weekly newspaper aimed at the young generation: La Jeunesse Socialiste. When World War I erupted, he was 19 and studying law. He interrupted his studies to enrol in the infantry and fought through the entire campaign at Verdun, which he survived and was lucky to avoid amputation after suffering from frozen feet.

== Career ==
After demobilization, he completed his studies and joined the Paris Bar in 1921, to begin his career as a lawyer, defending political causes deemed lost, such as that of anarcho-pacifist Louis Lecoin (1927), as well as the Martiniquais who had rebelled against the French colonial government, or the French miners who had come out on justified, often violent strikes. In 1923, he broke off from the Bolshevik wing of the French socialist party, thus incurring the lasting hatred of the French communist party. In 1925, he created another paper, Le Soir, (Note: Not to be confused with the Belgian daily Le Soir, launched in 1887 and still in circulation today.) which was in print until 1932 and employed, among others, the poet Robert Desnos as journalist.
