= Brigitte Simonetta =

French television and radio presenter (born 1954)

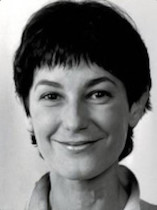
- Born: 27 March 1954 (age 71); Saint-Doulchard (Cher); France
- Occupation: Television presenter
- Employer(s): Antenne 2 Gaz Réseau Distribution France

Brigitte Simonetta is a French television and radio presenter, born on 27 March 1954, in Saint-Doulchard (Cher).

== Biography ==
Brigitte Simonetta was a stage actress in the 1970s. Her career began on Antenne 2 in 1977 when she was selected, along with the television presenter Dorothée, to become a continuity announcer on one of the first TV talent shows. She occasionally presented episodes of Récré A2 semaine, a youth program hosted by Jacqueline Joubert, between January 1979 and January 1980. She later became a weather presenter on Antenne 2 in the 1980s. From 1987 to 1989, she hosted the "Environment" segment in Bernard Rapp's weekly show, L'Assiette anglaise.

In 1990 she was hired by RTL to replace Anne-Marie Peysson and present a daily afternoon show. She stayed there until 1993. In the 2000s she was a presenter on the cable channel Santé Vie in the show Femmes-Enfants.

Starting from 2012 she worked at GRDF as a communications delegate for the Mediterranean region.

== Chernobyl disaster ==
On 30 April 1986 Brigitte Simonetta announced in the weather report on Antenne 2's news broadcast:

In France, the Azores high-pressure system has developed. The weather forecast indicates that it will remain sufficiently strong until next Friday to provide a genuine protective barrier. It effectively blocks all disturbances coming from the East. However, these forecasts are established for three days; it remains to be seen how long it will take to extinguish the fire.

This commentary was illustrated by a weather map of Europe, on which a STOP sign covered the French border from Nice to Belgium. However, if the positioning of the high-pressure systems and lows was correct, this did not indicate that a protective barrier would be provided. In fact, as early as the following day, 1 May, the noon news broadcast reported that increased radioactivity had been detected in the Southeast. By 2 May, the entire region was affected.

Brigitte Simonetta took responsibility for the STOP sign. She stated that she had written her commentary alone based on Météo-France's forecasts. In 2019 Brigitte Simonetta, then retired, testified that this episode remains a "sore spot" and that it "directed [her] life," including her professional reorientation in 1993.

== Publications ==
- Terre mode d'emploi, Michel Lafon Publishing – 1990 ISBN 978-2-908652-04-8 and ISBN 2908652-04-8.
- Gestes d'intérieur : comment mieux vivre dans la maison, Michel Lafon Publishing, 2005 ISBN 978-2-749902-61-6 and ISBN 2-749902-61-4.
- Mieux vivre chez soi : les bons gestes d'intérieur, J'ai lu, 2007 ISBN 978-2-290004-90-6 and ISBN 2-290004-90-1.

== Filmography ==
- Françoise Dolto, documentary, Arte, 2008, co-directed with Emmanuelle Nobécourt.
