= Entre le bœuf et l'âne gris =

French Christmas carol

- Carol
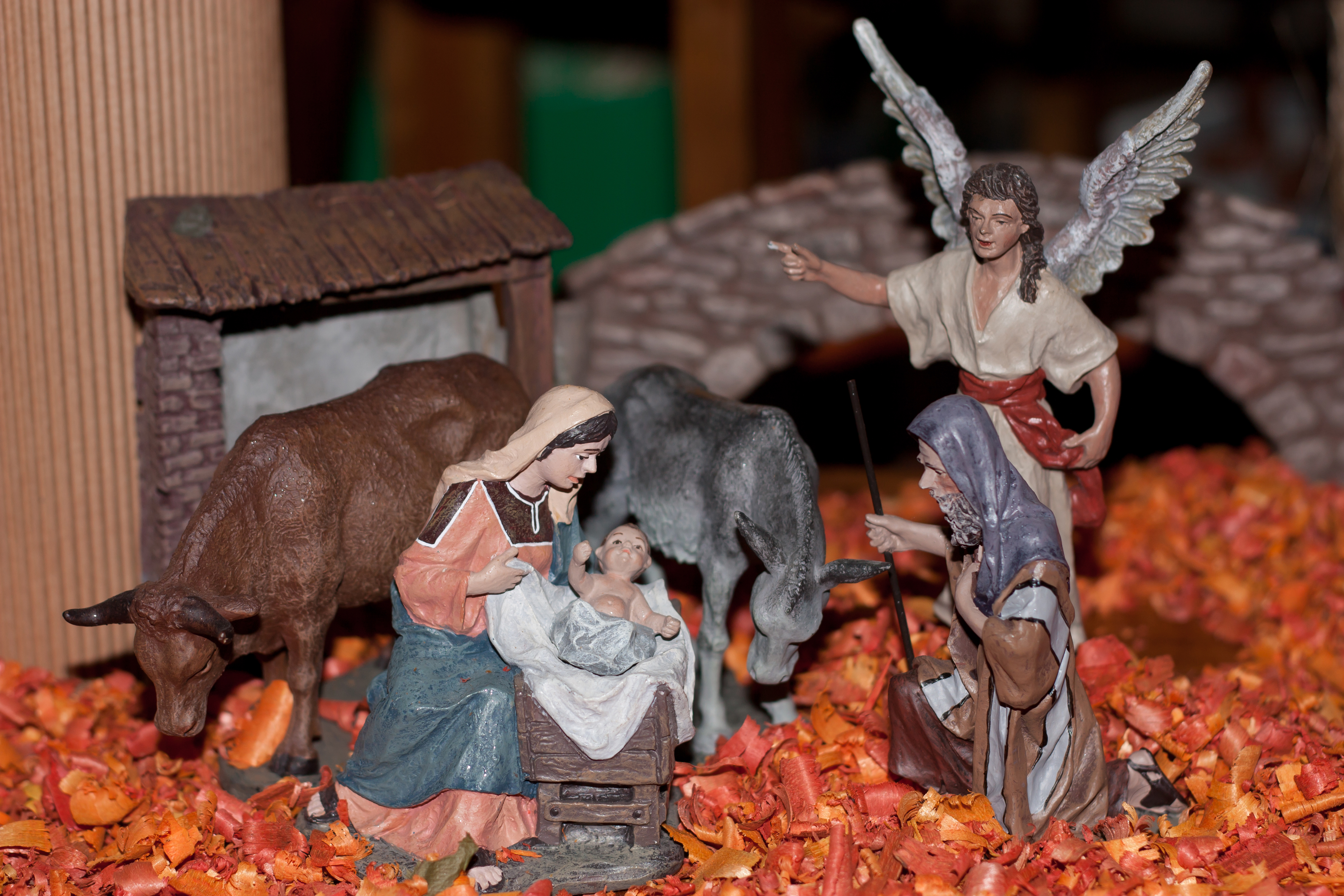
- English: "Between the ox and the grey donkey"
- Genre: Christmas carol
- Language: French
- Based on: Isaiah 1:3

"Entre le bœuf et l'âne gris" (Between the ox and the grey donkey), also known as "Le sommeil de l'enfant Jésus" (The sleep of baby Jesus) is a French Christmas carol. One of the oldest extant carols, it has been dated to both the 13th and the 16th centuries.

The supposed presence of the two animals at the birth of Jesus may have its origin in the Book of Isaiah chapter 1 verse 3: "The ox knoweth his owner, and the ass his master's crib: but Israel doth not know, my people doth not consider."

== Tunes ==
Traditional melody

Version by François-Auguste Gevaert:

== Lyrics ==
Entre le bœuf et l'âne gris
dort, dort, dort le petit fils.
Refrain:
Mille anges divins, mille séraphins
volent à l'entour de ce grand dieu d'amour.

Entre les deux bras de Marie
dort, dort, dort le fruit de vie.
Refrain

Entre les roses et les lys
dort, dort, dort le petit fils.
Refrain

Entre les pastoureaux jolis
dort, dort, Jésus qui sourit.
Refrain

En ce beau jour si solennel
Dort, dort, dort l'Emmanuel.
Refrain

Between the ox and the grey donkey
sleeps, sleeps, sleeps the little son.
Refrain:
A thousand divine angels, a thousand seraphim
fly around this great God of love.

Between the two arms of Mary
Sleeps, sleeps, sleeps the fruit of life.
Refrain

Between the roses and the lilies,
Sleeps, sleeps, sleeps the little son.
Refrain

Amidst the gentle shepherds
Sleeps, sleeps Jesus who smiles.
Refrain

On this beautiful, so solemn day
Sleeps, sleeps, sleeps Emmanuel.
Refrain
