= Pierre Salviac =

- Born: 28 June 1946 (age 79); Rochefort, France
- Occupation: Sports journalist

Pierre Salviac is a French journalist and a commentator of Rugby, born 28 June 1946 in Rochefort, Charente-Maritime.

In 1964, Pierre Salviac joins the ORTF then France Inter radio and covers events such as the mission Apollo 13 (1970), the incident of Bloody Sunday (1972), and the Soweto riots (1976). He is correspondent in the United States for the Vietnam War.

In 1976 he is recruited by Antenne 2 television. He presents various sports, in particular cycling and the Tour de France. Since 1984 he focuses on the comments of the games of Rugby union. He will know several tandems with former players who undertake the technical explanations, while Pierre Salviac concentrates on the description, statistics and anecdotes, quoting for model the commentator of BBC Bill McLaren. He comments 500 matches until July 2005.

He was fired from RTL after being accused of sexism by posting a rude and sexist comment against First Lady Valérie Trierweiler where he said "To my dear female colleagues, choose wisely who you shag and you might become first ladies of France".
