= Robert Beauvais =

French writer and journalist (1911–1982)

- Born: 6 March 1911; Paris
- Died: 23 February 1982 (aged 70); Boulogne-Billancourt
- Occupations: Writer, journalist, radio producer, screenwriter and comedian
- Spouses: Gisèle Parry; Ginette Garcin
- Children: Élisabeth Beauvais

Robert Beauvais (6 March 1911 – 23 February 1982) was a French writer and journalist. He was married twice, to Gisèle Parry and Ginette Garcin. From his first marriage he had a daughter, Élisabeth Beauvais, a musician known as Clothilde. Among his friends were Guy des Cars, Jacques Rueff, Maurice Boitel, and Françoise Sagan. Some of his works were later adapted by Jean Yanne. Beauvais is buried in the village of Audresselles.

== Biography ==
Beauvais was the creator and producer of numerous radio and television programs, which he hosted with his wife Gisèle Parry. He also wrote plays and essays.

During his military service in the Near East in the early 1930s, he met the painter and entomologist Wilfrid Perraudin.

On September 30 1968, he interviewed passengers and local residents on the Palavas little train before the closure of the line by the Hérault department's local railway company (Chemins de fer et transport automobile).

He was a friend of economist and politician Jacques Rueff, writer Guy des Cars, painter Maurice Boitel and writer Françoise Sagan. He was married to Gisèle Parry, then to Ginette Garcin, and is the father of singer Élizabeth Beauvais, known under the pseudonym Clothilde. His grave is in the village cemetery of Audresselles.

In 1974, he co-wrote with Jean Yanne and Gérard Sire the adaptation of his novel Quand les chinois: Chinese in Paris.

In May 1977, he signed an appeal calling for a halt to current proceedings against the Groupe Union Défense.

Some of his works were used as the basis for screenplays in films by Jean Yanne. In 1980, he appeared in Nelly Kaplan Charles et Lucie, playing the role of a square keeper.

For television, he commented on the Eurovision Song Contest 1961 for French-speaking television stations. Between 1969 and 1971, he took part in the international French-language television game show Le Francophonissime, alternating with Jean Lanzi, Robert Rocca and Maurice Biraud. He remained on Jacques Martin (TV host) show Thé dansant until his death.

== Works ==
=== Theatre ===
- Peau neuve
- Les Derniers Outrages

=== Humorous works ===
- Histoire de France et de s'amuser (illustrations de Jacques Chaval) (1964)
- Quand les Chinois (1966)
- L'Hexagonal tel qu'on le parle (1970)
- Pigeon vote (1971)
- Le Français kiskose (1975)
- Nous serons tous des Protestants (1976)
- Le Demi-juif (1977)
- Les Tartuffes de l'écologie (1978)
- Mythologie (1979)
