= Patrick Chêne =

French journalist

- Born: 26 April 1956 (age 70); Lyon, France
- Occupation: Sports journalist

Patrick Chêne (born 26 April 1956 in Lyon) is a French journalist who worked mainly on France TV, where he commented on the Tour de France between 1989 and 2000.

== Biography ==
=== Youth ===
Educated at the Lyons High School of St. Mary Lyon, and then becoming a law graduate, Patrick Chêne began his journalistic career in 1977 as a freelancer at the Progrès de Lyon. He then worked in the letters department, then the sports section of the newspaper.

=== TV career ===
In 1982 he joined the newspaper L'Équipe, then in 1985 he worked on television at Antenne 2 as a journalist for Stade 2.

He commented on the Tour de France from 1989 to 2000 in the company of Robert Chapatte, then Bernard Thevenet.

Patrick Chêne was appointed sports director of Antenne 2 and presented Stade 2 between March 1992 – July 1995 before moving to newscast the newsshow 13 heures on France 2 from 1995 to 1998. He was then director of the sports department of France Télévisions from 1998 to 2000, succeeding Jean Reveillon.

From 1997 to 1999 he co-hosted Telethon with Sophie Davant. He also co-hosted Les Trésors du monde with Nathalie Simon in 1994.

=== Founder-director of Sporever ===
After leaving France Télévisions in 2000, he founded and directed the group Sporever which specializes in publishing and content production.

He was also host of the Histoires de Sport on Orange sport.

=== Back to TV ===
In September 2010 Patrick Chêne had taken over for Pierre Sled – Also a former presenter of Stade 2 – on The Parliamentary Channel and presented Politique Matin, the "little political lunch" of the TV channel. He was also executive producer of the show.

In September 2012 Patrick Chêne created a TV channel dedicated to sports news, Sport365 where he hosted the show Incognito.

In July 2015 Patrick Chêne announced he was leaving Politique Matin and CPAC but that the shows will continue.

=== Arts and entertainment ===
In 2009 he wrote a play, C'est pas gagné (It is not won). The main performers are his daughter Juliette and his son-in-law Jean-Charles Chagachbanian. Given the success of the performances, a tour was organized until 2011.

He wrote four TV movies about a policeman in the series Les Cinq Dernières Minutes: Un mort sur les pavés. The action takes place during the Paris-Roubaix and Patrick Chêne appears as himself.

=== Private life ===
Patrick Chêne is the father of five children. One of his daughters, Juliette, is an actress, best known for the role of Juliet in the soap opera Plus belle la vie.

His niece, Astrid Veillon, is also an actress, and best known for her role in Quai numéro un.

== Radio career ==
Patrick Chêne has been a radio executive. Indeed, on 1 August 2002, the Sport O'FM radio station, which later became Europe 1 Sport, was put into receivership. Different recovery projects were proposed and it was the tender of Patrick Chêne's Sporever group with FM Sport which was chosen. Patrick Chêne, however, resold quickly to Sport FM at the groupe Contact in August 2003.

== Books ==
- A mon tour, éditions Robert Laffont, 1998 (ISBN 978-2221088159)

== Awards ==
Patrick Chêne received four Sept d'ors:

- Sept d'or for best sports journalist (1993)

== See also ==
- List of commentators in the Tour de France in France
