= D'où viens-tu, bergère? =

French Christmas carol

"D'où viens-tu, bergère? ("Where are you coming from, shepherdess?") is a traditional French christmas carol.

A shepherdess comes from visiting the manger of Jesus and tells others of his birth. The carol is a popular choice for francophone choirs internationally, especially in Canada.

Lyrics for "D'où viens-tu, bergère" were published in Vieilles chansons patoises du Périgord (1888, 2nd ed. 1903) as collected by Emmanuel Casse and Eugène Chaminade. The song was adapted in 1866 into English by William McLennan with the title "Whence art thou, my maiden?"

== Lyrics ==
"D'où viens-tu, bergère,
d'où viens-tu?"
"Je viens de l'étable,
de m'y promener;
j'ai vu un miracle
ce soir arrivé."

"Qu'as-tu vu, bergère,
qu'as-tu vu?"
"J'ai vu dans la crèche
un petit enfant
sur la paille fraîche
mis bien tendrement."

"Rien de plus, bergère,
rien de plus?"
"Saint' Marie, sa mère,
Qui lui fait boir' du lait,
Saint Joseph, son père,
qui tremble du froid."

"Rien de plus, bergère,
rien de plus?"
"Ya le boeuf et l'âne,
qui sont par devant,
avec leur haleine
réchauffent l'enfant"

"Rien de plus, bergère,
rien de plus?"
"Ya trois petits anges
descendus du ciel
chantant les louanges
du Père éternel."

"Whence art thou, my maiden,
Whence art thou?"
"I come from the stable
where this very night,
I, a shepherd maiden,
saw a wondrous sight."

"What saw'st thou, my maiden,
what saw'st thou?"
"There within the manger
a little babe I saw,
lying softly sleeping
on the golden straw."

"Nothing more, my maiden,
nothing more?"
"I saw the Holy Mother
the little baby hold,
and the father, Joseph,
a tremble with the cold."

"Nothing more, my maiden,
nothing more?"
"I saw the ass and oxen
kneeling meek and mild,
with their gentle breathing
warm the Holy Child."

"Nothing more, my maiden,
nothing more?"
"There were three bright angels
come down from the sky
singing forth sweet praises
to the Father high."

== Melody ==
Source
