= Léa Salamé =

French journalist (born 1979)

- Born: Hala Léa Salamé; 27 October 1979 (age 46); Beirut, Lebanon
- Education: Panthéon-Assas University; Sciences Po; New York University
- Occupation: Journalist
- Partner: Raphaël Glucksmann
- Children: 1
- Parent(s): Ghassan Salamé; Mary Boghossian

Hala Léa Salamé (French: [lea salame]; born 27 October 1979) is a French journalist and television and radio host. She currently anchors the Journal de 20 heures, the 8 o'clock evening news show on France 2.

Prior to taking over the evening news hour, Salamé was a longtime presenter on France Inter's morning show including conducting the key 7:50 am radio interview from 2014 to 2025. She also presented On n'est pas couché then L'Émission politique and a cultural magazine on France 2.

She is in a relationship with Place Publique co-president Raphaël Glucksmann, with whom she shares a son, and the two have been described as a "power couple" in France.

== Early life ==
Hala Léa Salamé is the daughter of Ghassan Salamé, Lebanese Minister of Culture and former special advisor to UN Secretary-General Kofi Annan. Her mother, Mary Boghossian, is of Armenian descent and a survivor of the Armenian genocide, is the sister of diamond dealers Jean and Albert Boghossian. She and her family left Lebanon during the civil war, settling in Paris at age 5 and she acquired French nationality in 1988.

She began high school at Lycée Saint-Louis-de-Gonzague. She entered the École alsacienne in her second year of high school, changing her legal name to simply Léa before entering.

Léa Salamé studied law at Panthéon-Assas University and Sciences Po. She spent a year at New York University, where she was injured in the 11 September 2001 attacks.

== Career ==
=== 2003–2014: Public Sénat, France 24 and I-Télé (TV) ===
Salamé began her journalism career as an intern on La Chaîne parlementaire working under Jean-Pierre Elkabbach, a friend of her father's, eventually making her debut as a presenter alongside him on Public Sénat. In September 2006, she started working for newly created French international news TV channel France 24. There, she presented La Soirée, a live evening news program, alternating with Antoine Cormery.

Salamé joined i>Télé in late 2010 and presented a political show, Élysée 2012, in the run-up to the 2012 French presidential election. Starting in September 2011, she hosted the evening news with Marc Fauvelle and in September 2012, a political debate programme. The next year, she became the host of Ça se dispute ("it's a debate") where she moderated debates between Éric Zemmour and Nicolas Domenach as commentators.

=== 2014–2025: France Inter (radio) ===
Since August 2014, Salamé has hosted the 7:50 a.m. interview in France Inter's morning show. Since December 2015, she has also conducted interviews in the French edition of GQ.

In the summer of 2019, she hosted a podcast called "Powerful Women" at France Inter, revolving around female individuality in relation to power and femininity, as seen in the fields of publishing, literature, film, business, and sports. In 2022, Salamé published her first book, Strong Women, a series of 12 interviews around female power, originally conducted as a podcast in summer 2019, in which she described her "pantheon of femininity".

She left France Inter while preparing to take over the 8'clock news hour in June 2025.

=== 2014–: France 2 (TV) ===
In August 2014, Salamé succeeded Natacha Polony in the duo of commentators which she formed with Aymeric Caron, then with Yann Moix, in Laurent Ruquier's show, On n'est pas couché, aired on France 2. On 14 April 2016, as she interviewed President François Hollande with David Pujadas in the programme Dialogues citoyens on France 2, Léa Salamé replied to President Hollande, who was making a comment on refugees, "Are you joking?", which triggered many reactions on social media, with subsequent articles describing her interview as terse, "too aggressive", or biased.

In May 2016, she left On n'est pas couché after a successful two year run, preferring to host the L'Émission politique political show ahead of the 2017 presidential election. It was announced she would cohost the new magazine-style political show with David Pujadas starting in September 2016. It was also announced that she would begin hosting the cultural magazine Stupéfiant! in addition to the political show.

Starting 25 August, 2025, Salamé presents Journal de 20 heures (the 8 pm news hour) on France 2. She replaced Anne-Sophie Lapix who was fired as France 2 sought a new face for the program. Her salary of 25,000€ monthly drew controversy, despite it being half compared to an offer of 50,000€ a month from BFM TV, which tried to poach her. The show drew record ratings.

=== Coverage of elections ===
==== 2017 presidential election ====
During the 2017 French Socialist Party presidential primary, she cohosted the third debate in January along with David Pujadas and Fabien Namias with the seven candidates participating, organized by France 2 and other media outlets. In April, against with Pujadas, she cohosted the program "Le Grand Oral - 15 minutes pour convaincre" (The Grand Oral: 15 minutes to convince) on France 2 which gave each presidential candidate 15 minutes to present their agenda.

==== 2019 European elections ====
On 15 March 2019, Salamé announced that she would temporarily withdraw from France 2's L'Émission politique and from France Inter's morning show to avoid conflicts of interest after her partner Raphaël Glucksmann was announced as a candidate in the election for the European Parliament. She stated she would continue on her cultural show, Stupéfiant!, also aired on France 2.

The decision followed the precedent set by Anne Sinclair, the journalist who was married to Dominique Strauss-Kahn. However, it was criticized by Audrey Pulvar, former partner of Arnaud Montebourg, who suffered the same fate in 2012 when he joined the government who described it as unfairly sexist.

On May 27, 2019, after her partner's successful election to the European Parliament, Salamé rejoined France Inter's morning show.

==== 2022 presidential election ====
During the 2022 French presidential election, Salamé hosted the debate prior to the second round of the presidential election between Emmanuel Macron and Marine Le Pen along with Gilles Bouleau.

=== Other Activities ===
In 2018, she played herself in a web series parodying Sibyle Veil and Guy Lagache, the bosses of Radio France, created by Charline Vanhoenacker and Alex Vizorek.

== Personal life ==
Salamé is in a relationship with politician Raphaël Glucksmann, an MEP and the co-president of Place Publique, since November 2015. They have a son born in 2017. She is also the stepmother of Glucksmann's son from his previous relationship. The two have been described as a top power couple in France.

Salamé is a practicing Catholic.

In 2018, she participated in Al Pacino's show at the Théâtre de Paris, interviewing the actor, declining to be paid for the appearance because she is a "huge" fan of the actor.

== Awardscommenting ==
- "Woman of the year 2014" by the French edition of GQ
- "Best interviewer of the year 2015" (Prix Philippe-Caloni)
