= Étienne Leenhardt =

- Born: 25 July 1962 (age 63); Montpellier, l'Hérault
- Occupation: journalist
- Known for: Associate Director of Information on France 2 (since March 2004)

Étienne Leenhardt (born 25 July 1962) is a French TV host, journalist, editor, and executive. Leenhardt has been deputy director of Information for France 2 since March 2004. From September 2008 to the end of 2015, he was the presenter of the magazine Un œil sur la planète before going to Samah Soula.

== Biography ==
Leenhardt was born on 25 July 1962 in Montpellier, Hérault to Nicolas Leenhardt (1931–1986), professor of mathematics, and Françoise Boucomont (born 1932), secretary to the Protestant Institute of Theology. He has three brothers and a sister.

== Career ==
After receiving a degree in languages from Université Paul Valéry in Montpellier, Leenhardt studied at the School of Journalism in Paris. Previously chosen to host variety shows by La Cinq, he presented from 1990 to 1991 at Télématin on France 2. Leenhardt presented the news show Journal de 20 heures from 1994 to 1995. Placed in special operations, he then become the correspondent of France 2 for Washington, D.C., and then London.

In 2003, he became editor of the service Enquêtes et reportages (investigations and reports), then in March of the following year, he became deputy director of Information of France 2, alongside Arlette Chabot. At the start of September 2008, he succeeded Thierry Thuillier in presenting the quarterly magazine on geopolitics Un œil sur la planète and took over the management of investigations and reporting, while remaining deputy director of Information.

On 14 July 2010, when delegations of thirteen African countries' armies participated as guests of honor at the parade on the Champs-Élysées, a reporter said on Journal de 20 heures, "Sur le plan politique, il n'y a pas de dictature en Afrique francophone" ("Politically there are no dictators in French-speaking Africa").

== Personal life ==
In September 1988, Leenhardt married Nathalie Senneville, editor-in-chief of the Protestant weekly Reform. He is the father of three children: Hugo (1991), Jeanne (1993), and Emma (1997).
