= List of programs broadcast by France 2 =

This is a list of television programs broadcast by France 2.

== Current ==
=== News ===
- Complément d'enquête (since 2001)
- Consomag (since 1965)
- Envoyé spécial (since 1990)
- Expression directe
- Faites entrer l'accusé
- Journal
- L'Émission politique
- Télématin
- Un œil sur la planète (2002-2017)
- French Presidential Debates (since 1988)

=== Magazine ===
- 30 millions d'amis (2004-2006)
- Actuality (2016-2017)
- C'est au programme (1998-2019)

=== Documentaries ===
- Les pouvoirs extraordinaires du corps humain (since 2012)
- Rendez-vous en terre inconnue (since 2006)
- Secrets d'Histoire (2007-2019)

=== Sports ===
- Olympic Games
- Stade 2 (1975-2019)
- Tour de France
- Roland-Garros

=== Entertainment ===
- La Chance aux chansons (1991-2000)
- Le plus grand cabaret du monde (1998-2019)
- Les années bonheur (2006-2019)
- Prodiges (since 2014)
- Taratata (since 1993)
- Vivement dimanche (1998-2022)
- Drag Race France (since 2022)
- MasterChef France (since 2022)

=== Game shows ===
- Fort Boyard (since 1990)
- N'oubliez pas les paroles! (since 2007)
- Tout le monde veut prendre sa place (since 2006)
- Chacun son tour (since 2021)

=== Talk shows ===
- Amanda (2016-2017)
- Ça commence aujourd'hui (since 2018)
- Ça se discute (1994-2009)
- Campus
- Double je
- Mots croisés
- L'émission pour tous (2014)
- On a tout essayé (2000-2007)
- On n'est pas couché (2006-2020)
- Thé ou Café (1996-2018)
- Tout le monde en parle (1998-2006)
- Toute une histoire (2006-2016)
- On est en direct (2020-2022)

=== Music ===
- Eurovision Song Contest
- Junior Eurovision Song Contest
- Les victoires de la musique
- Top of the pops

=== TV series ===
- A Cops (Un Flic série)
- Agatha Christie's Poirot (Hercule Poirot)
- Astrid et Raphaëlle
- Broadchurch (Broadchurch)
- Castle (Castle)
- The Closer (The Closer : L.A enquêtes prioritaires)
- Cœur océan (Cœur océan)
- Committed (Marni et Nate)
- Fais pas ci, fais pas ça (Fais pas ci, fais pas ça)
- Grounded for Life (Parents à tout prix)
- Major Crimes (Major Crimes)
- Minuit, le soir (Minuit, le soir)
- The O.C. (Newport Beach)
- Rizzoli & Isles (Rizzolli and Isles : Autopsie d'un Meurtre)
- Sherlock (Sherlock)
- Témoins (Witnesses)
- Water Rats (Brigade Des Mers)
- Without a Trace (FBI : Portés disparus)
- Private Practice (Private Practice)
- Candice Renoir

=== Dramas ===
- Band of Brothers
- Bardot
- Boomtown
- Boston Public
- Cold Case
- La crim'
- The District (Washington Police)
- ER (Urgences)
- Fastlane
- JAG
- PJ
- Spin
- Third Watch (New York 911)
- Without a Trace (FBI: Portés Disparus)

=== Soap operas ===
- The Bold and the Beautiful (Amour, gloire et beauté)
- Days of Our Lives (Des jours et des vies)
- Un si grand soleil (since 2018)

=== Sitcoms ===
- Friends
- Samantha oups!
- The Fresh Prince Of Bel-Air

== Former ==
=== Game shows ===
- 60 secondes du Colisée (2007)
- Les Bons génies (1996)
- Avec ou sans joker (2013)
- Carbone 14 (2006)
- Chéri(e), fais les valises ! (2011)
- Code de la route (2003-2004, 2011)
- Des chiffres et des lettres (1965-2006)
- Dingbats (1992)
- En toutes lettres (2009-2011)
- Et 1, et 2, et 3 ! (1999)
- Face à la bande (2014)
- Intervilles (2004-2005-2013)
- Jeux sans frontières (1965-1999)
- Joker (2015-2016)
- La Cible (2003-2007)
- La Gym des neurones (2000-2002)
- La Part du lion (2007)
- La télé est à vous ! (2009-2010)
- Le 4e Duel (2008-2013)
- Le Brise-cœur (2004)
- Le Coffre (2003-2004)
- Le Cube (2013)
- Le Grand Blind Test (2003)
- Le Jeu (1992-1993)
- Le Juste Euro (2001-2002)
- Le Numéro gagnant (2001-2002)
- Les Bons génies (1996)
- Les Cinglés de la télé (1999)
- Les Forges du désert (1999-2000)
- Les Trésors du monde (1994)
- Le Trophée Campus (1995)
- Les Z'amours (1995-2021)
- Millionnaire (2004-2008)
- Mot de passe (2009-2016, 2020-2021)
- Motus (1990-2019)
- N'oubliez pas votre brosse à dents (1994-1996)
- Passe à ton voisin (1997)
- Pop Show (2015-2016)
- Presto! (2008-2011)
- Pyramide (1991-2003, 2014-2015)
- Que le meilleur gagne (1992-1995, 2012, 2014)
- Qui est le bluffeur ? (2006)
- Qui est qui ? (1996-2002)
- Réveillez vos méninges (2010-2011)
- Seriez-vous un bon expert ? (2011-2013)
- Slam (2009)
- Tout vu tout lu (2003-2006)
- Trivial Pursuit (2002-2003)
- Un mot peut en cacher un autre (2015-2016)
- Un pour tous (1993)
- Volte-face (2012)

=== Preschollers/Children's programming ===
Domestic programs

- Back to the Future

=== Sports ===
- Davis Cup (until 2018)
- Professional wrestling in France (1960s until August 1985)
- Coupe de la Ligue (until 2020)
- Coupe de France (until 2022)
