= Thierry Thuillier =

French television journalist

- Born: May 24, 1963 (age 63); Saint-Mandé, Val-de-Marne, France
- Education: Institut d'études politiques de Paris; Licence d'administration économique et sociale
- Occupations: Journalist, Media executive
- Employer(s): Group TF1 (since August 2016) Canal + (2015); France Télévisions (2010-2015); CNews (2008-2010); France 2 (1994-2008); TF1 (1990-1994) BVA (1986-1990)

Thierry Thuillier, born on May 24, 1963, is a French television journalist. He has been the director general of LCI since 2016 and the news director of the TF1 Group since 2017.

== Early life and education ==
Thuillier is the son of a turner-mechanic.

After obtaining a degree in economic and social administration, he graduated from the Paris Institute of Political Studies and joined the polling institute BVA in 1986 as a political studies officer before becoming a journalist.

== Career ==
=== TF1 (1990-1994) ===
In the early 1990s, he worked for TF1, covering foreign policy from 1990 to 1993 and then domestic politics until 1994.

=== France 2 (1994-2008) ===
In 1994, he joined France 2. In the late 1990s, he presented some editions of the nightly news and regularly appeared in the various news broadcasts on the channel, notably in the special edition presented by David Pujadas following the September 11 attacks in the United States.

Thierry Thuillier is primarily known as France 2's "Mr. International" since he held the position of head of the international department for several years before assuming the role of head of the investigative journalism and reporting department at France 2.

In 2002, he created with Patrick Boitet on France 2 Un œil sur la planète, a quarterly magazine focused on geopolitics, which he presented until his departure in 2008.

In August 2007, he was appointed as the editor-in-chief of France 2's 8 PM news program Journal de 20 heures by Arlette Chabot. The edition presented by David Pujadas was strongly criticized by the channel's journalists, so he had to propose a news program more open to international affairs, Europe, and the environment, with greater clarity and coherence.

=== i>Télé/CNews (2008-2010) ===
In spring 2008, he left France 2 to replace Bernard Zekri and lead the editorial staff of the news channel i>Télé.

In November 2007 i>Télé had a national audience of 0.3% of people owning a television in France, and faced competition from BFM TV which has 0.8% of the market.

=== Return to France Télévisions (2010-2015) ===
In August 2010, he resigned from his position at Canal+ S.A. to join France Télévisions' news directorate, replacing Arlette Chabot, who was dismissed.

In October 2013, he became the new head of France 2, replacing Philippe Vilamitjana, who was fired after numerous failures with the fall 2013 lineup. He remained the director of news in parallel and implemented the merger of France 2 and France 3 newsrooms.

=== Canal+ (2015) ===
On June 1, 2015, he left his responsibilities at France Télévisions and France 2 to re-join Canal+ as the head of sports services. After a brief stint, he was replaced by Thierry Cheleman.

=== TF1 Group and LCI (2016-present) ===
On July 21, 2016, he was appointed by the TF1 Group as the general director of LCI and took office on August 16 following. He reformed the editorial line to refocus the channel on debates and editorialists, which resulted in increased viewership. On September 28, 2017, he was appointed by the TF1 Group as the news director and took office on the same day.
