= Sonia Chironi =

French journalist (born 1979)

- Born: 2 April 1979 (age 47); France
- Education: Paris Nanterre University; Sciences Po Lyon; Centre de formation des journalistes
- Occupation: Journalist
- Employer(s): France Info; France 2

Sonia Chironi (born 2 April 1979) is a French television journalist.

== Education and career ==
After earning a Licence in Law at Paris Nanterre University in 2001, she was trained at the Centre de formation des journalistes graduating in 2005. She started her career in I-Télé in 2007 until 2016. She then worked for France Ô and Arte. Since September 2023, she hosts the 18/20 of France Info. She is also the joker of Laurent Delahousse on France 2 presenting the Journal de 20 heures on weekends when he is on holidays.
