= French television content ratings =

The television content rating system in France consists of four ratings that add a minimum age to all television content, and has been used by various channels in the country, including TF1, France 3, Canal+, and 6ter.

== History of symbols ==
=== The white quadrilaterals (1961–96) ===
The "white square" was introduced on television in France in March 1961, shortly after the broadcast of Maurice Cazeneuve's drama L'Exécution, in which a nude female appeared for a few seconds. Its role was to warn viewers that the content shown on-screen was not "for all audiences". This "white square" was transformed into a white rectangle in 1964 and its appearance below a program was always preceded by a verbal warning from the speaker. The white square was mainly aimed at depictions of violence and pornography according to moral criteria established by a monitoring committee composed of personalities from the worlds of science, literature, pediatric medicine and film. Films such as Ivan le Terrible, Hôtel du Nord, La Femme du Boulanger, French Cancan or Les Offaxés, whose scenes were judged at the time by this ad hoc commission as potentially dangerous for young people because of their immoral or shocking nature, were covered in the white square.

=== The color codes (1996–2002) ===
Subsequent signage was established by the CSA on November 18, 1996, in the form of color codes. This signage, designed by Étienne Robial and Olivier Bontemps for View, included five pictograms corresponding to five program categories:

The French television content rating system from 1996 to 2002
Symbol	Category	Description
	I	A white diamond in a green disc, optional, for programmes for all audiences
	II	A white disc in a blue disc, for programs with desirable parental consent
	III	A white triangle in an orange disc, for programmes with "parental consent required or prohibited to children under 12 years of age"
	IV	A white square in a red disc, for programs marked as "prohibited to children under 16 years of age".
	V	A white cross in a purple disc, for programs marked as "prohibited to children under 18 years of age"

The pictograms used from 1996 to 2002 in France have since been adopted by various countries such as Greece and North Macedonia.

=== The next-generation pictograms (2002–present) ===
The television content rating system in France was changed on 18 November 2002 with the requirement for a prior warning for films not recommended for children under 10 years of age (category II) in the form of a pictogram on the screen five minutes at the beginning of the programme and the permanent inscription of a pictogram for programmes where the minimum recommended age is 12, 16 or 18 years (respectively categories III, IV, and V). These pictograms consist of white discs from which a relevant age is cut into stencils preceded by a minus sign.

Since December 12, 2012, the pictogram for content "not recommended for children under 10 years of age" has been displayed throughout the program in question.

The pictograms used to indicate the age limit recommended by the CSA for television content

Pictogram of recommendation for children over 10 years of age

Pictogram of recommendation or prohibition for children under 12 years of age

Pictogram of recommendation or prohibition for children under 16 years of age

Pictogram of recommendation or prohibition for children under 18 years of age

As there is no pictogram for French television content suitable for the general public, the content in question, such as the evening news programs of France 2 and France 3, 20 Heures and Soir3, is most likely suitable for all audiences.

== See also ==
- Television content rating system
- Conseil supérieur de l'audiovisuel
