= Leenhardt =

Leenhardt is a French surname. Notable people with the surname include:

- Étienne Leenhardt (1962—), journalist
- Maurice Leenhardt (1876—1954), anthropologist
- Max Leenhardt (1853—1941), painter
- Roger Leenhardt (1903—1985), filmmaker
