= Thomas Sénécal =

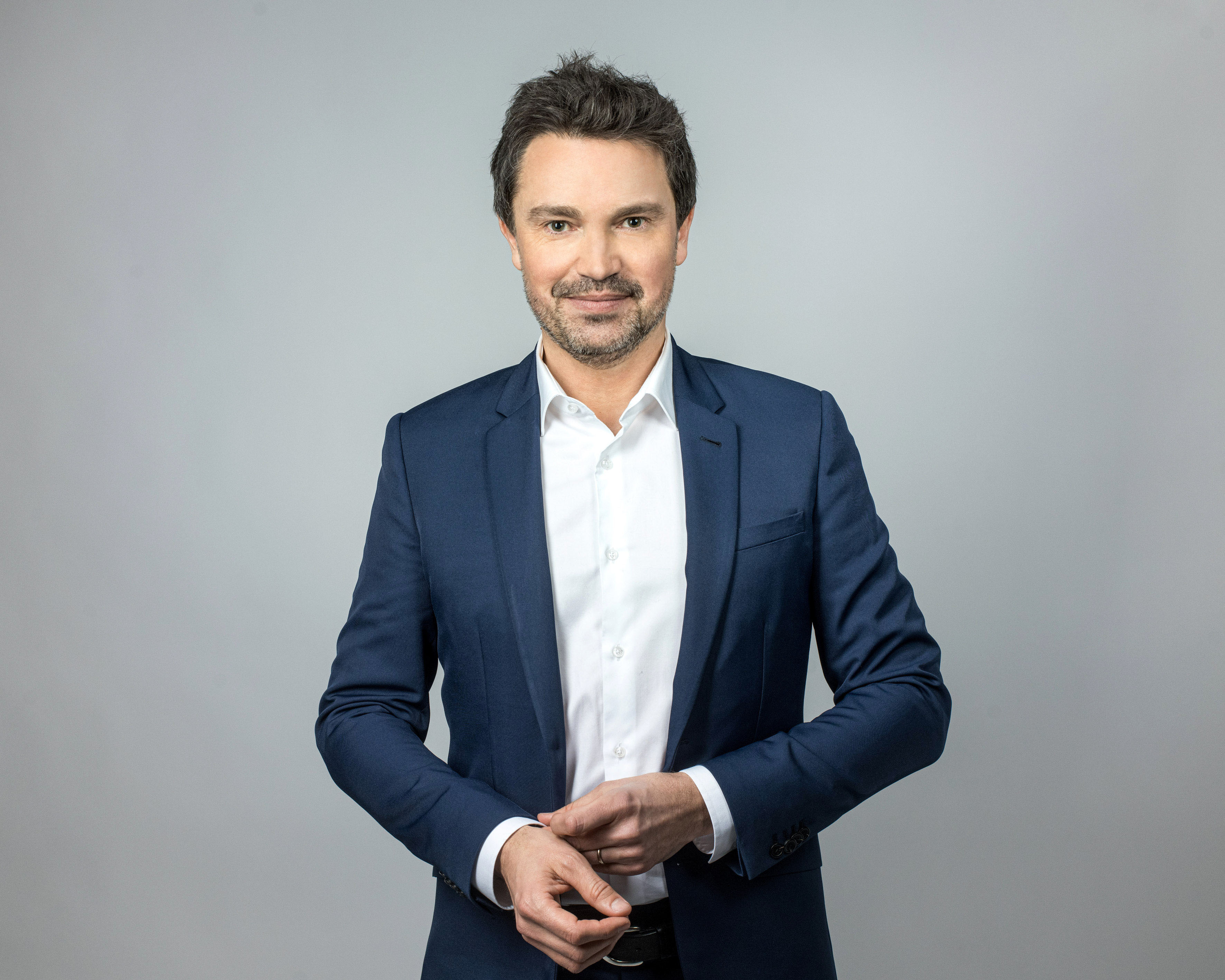

Thomas Sénécal, born in 1975 in Honfleur (Calvados), is a French journalist and television presenter specializing in motor sports. He has been the Director of Sports at Canal+ Group since July 1, 2022.

== Youth ==
The youngest of a family of seven children, Thomas Sénécal has always been passionate about news, geography, and sports. From primary school onwards, he dreamt of becoming a journalist. At 16 years old, with a group of young people from Honfleur, he took a tour of Europe by train and reported on it in the local press. At 18, he worked for the newspaper L'Eveil-Côte Normande in Deauville. At that time, he was a student in hypokhâgne. His academic path in preparatory literary classes and then university studies in history led him to Caen, Lille, and finally Paris at the Centre de formation des journalistes (class of 1998). His father, Henri, managed an automobile garage in Ablon in the Calvados region and participated in rallies. Thomas accompanied him as a co-driver between 1996 and 1999 in a Renault 5 GT Turbo.

== Career ==
He began his career at France Télévisions in 1998, covering the World Cup and the Tour de France; in 1999, he joined TF1 as a reporter for the Auto-Moto show. He covered the World Rally Championship and accompanied Sébastien Loeb's rise to fame. In 2004, he became the presenter of Auto-Moto until 2007. He then joined the sports editorial team for TF1's 13:00 and 20:00 news broadcasts, covering the 2008 Beijing Olympics.

In 2009, he was hired by Canal+ as a senior reporter for the Canal Football Club and presenter of various events such as the Paris Judo World Championships or the Winter X Games in Tignes. He covered Ligue 1, the Olympic Games, handball, and the WRC rally. He worked for the Infosport+ channel in 2011 and 2012. In 2013, Canal+ announced the acquisition of exclusive broadcasting rights for Formula 1. Named head editor of the F1 team by Cyril Linette, Thomas Sénécal also presented the new show "La Grille." For 10 years, he led and supported the editorial development of Formula One on Canal+. He was in charge of a team composed of journalists and driver-consultants such as Julien Fébreau, Alain Prost, Margot Laffite, Jean Alesi, Laurie Delhostal, Thomas Thouroude, Laurent Dupin, Karim Bennani, Franck Montagny, Jacques Villeneuve and Romain Grosjean.

In 2019, Canal+ acquired the rights to broadcast the Moto GP World Championship. Thomas Sénécal created an editorial setup that included Marina Lorenzo, David Dumain, Randy de Puniet, Laurent Rigal, Louis Rossi, Jules Deremble, Sylvain Guintoli, Régis Laconi and Jules Danilo. In 2020, he was appointed deputy director of editorial content for Canal+, responsible for motorsport and all-around sports (basketball, paddle tennis, sailing, boxing). On January 21, 2022, the Canal+ group announced that Thomas Sénécal would succeed Thierry Cheleman as head of sports services effective July 1 of 2022. His mission is to highlight the most prestigious international and national sporting competitions on the premium channel. "We want the subscriber to be part of the journey, to be with us in the stadium or on the track."

== Works ==
- Thomas Sénécal is the co-author, along with Fabrice Connen and François Baudin, of the book Sébastien Loeb trajectoire gagnante, published on March 8, 2004, by Silver Editions and prefaced by Guy Fréquelin. This book collects the accounts and testimonials from various actors involved in Sébastien Loeb's rise to success, illustrated with photos from the DPPI agency.
- Thomas Sénécal is also the co-author, along with Fabrice Connen, of the book Champions du monde, prefaced by Sébastien Loeb and dedicated to the achievements of French manufacturer Citroën, its driver from Alsace, and Monaco co-driver Daniel Elena in the World Rally Championship following the Tour de Corse. This second volume, published on January 11, 2005, by Silver Editions and illustrated with photos from the DPPI agency, tells the story of men dedicated to victory, the crowning of Guy Fréquelin's team at the end of the 2004 season, following a meteoric rise fifteen years after the creation of Citroën Sport and four years after Sébastien Loeb's professional debut.

== Private life ==
Thomas Sénécal is married and father of three children.
