= Philippe Vilamitjana =

French journalist

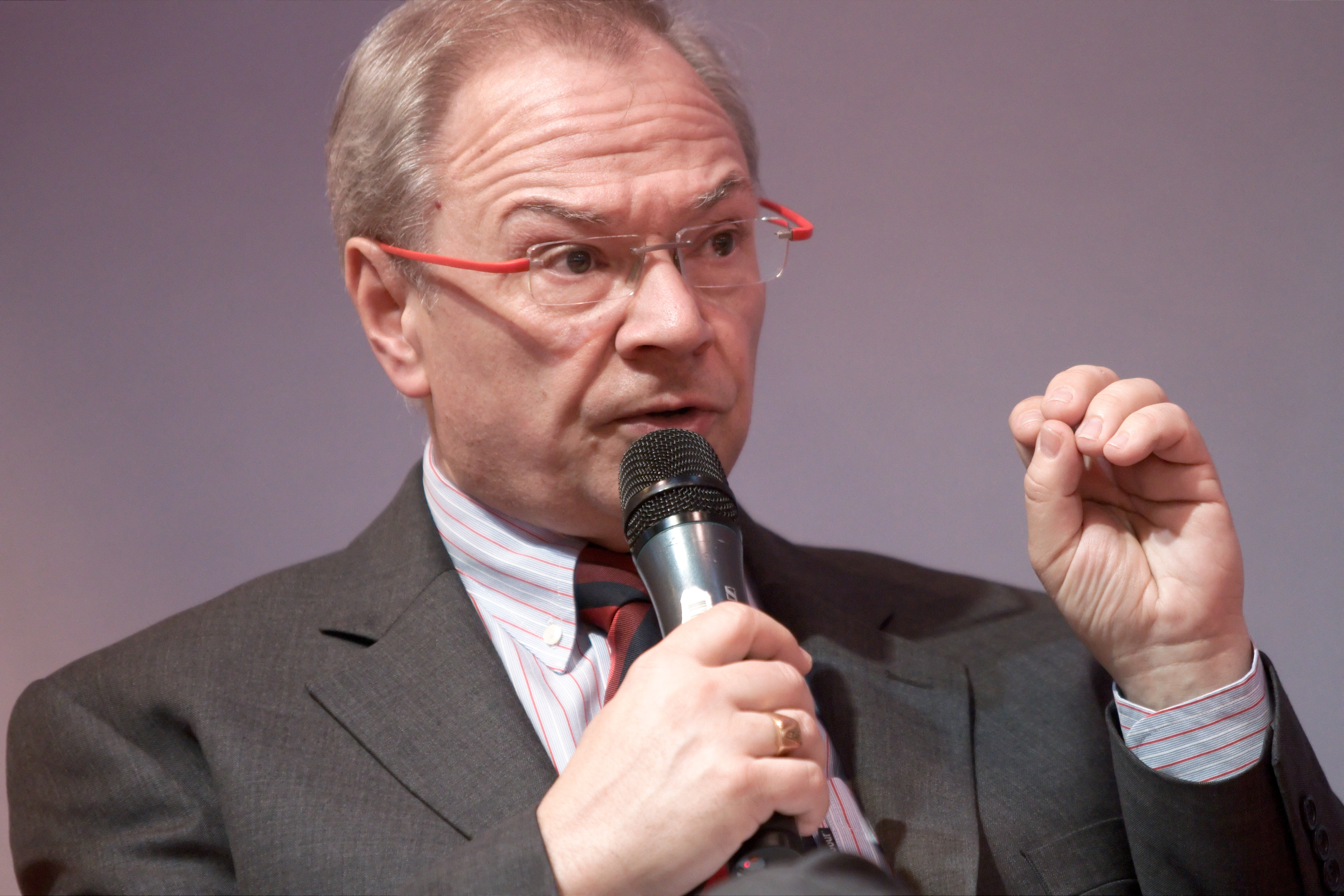
- Philippe Vilamitjana at Salon du livre de Paris in March 2010.
- Born: May 17, 1955; 71 years ago
- Education: Institut de journalisme Bordeaux Aquitaine; Institut d'études politiques de Bordeaux
- Occupations: Journalist, television director, television producer

Philippe Vilamitjana, born on May 17, 1955, is a French journalist and television network executive. He has primarily worked for France 2, France 3, and France 5.

== Biography ==
Graduated from the Institut d'études politiques de Bordeaux and the Institut de journalisme Bordeaux Aquitaine, he began his journalism career in 1979 at FR3 Aquitaine before joining FR3 Paris Île-de-France as deputy chief editor. In 1986, he joined Thalassa as a senior reporter and became deputy chief editor, then chief editor in 1990.

In May 2001, he was appointed deputy director of the Thalassa program unit, in charge of the programs Thalassa and Faut pas rêver, alongside Georges Pernoud.

On October 3, 2005, he was appointed delegate director of programs for France 5. He took up his duties on October 5, 2005. On July 6, 2006, he was appointed director of broadcasting nad programming for France 5 after Alexandre Michelin's departure.

In June 2007, he decided to stop broadcasting journalist Daniel Schneidermann's program Arrêt sur images, one of the longest-running programs on France 5, deeming it "worn out."

In 2010, he was appointed director of the airwaves and programs for France 2. In this role, he accumulated failures, notably the highly publicized failure of Jusqu'ici tout va bien with Sophia Aram, a project he had "carried and defended" according to the newspaper Libération, as well as other failures like the culinary game Dans la peau d'un chef, and before the 8 p.m. news, the short drama series Y a pas d’âge with Claude Brasseur, Marthe Villalonga, and Arielle Dombasle. In the fall of 2012, he had launched Bruce Toussaint with Vous trouvez ça normal? on Friday evenings and Roumanoff et les garçons before the 8 p.m. news, which was quickly removed. Philippe Vilamitjana also ended Philippe Lefait's program Des Mots de minuit in June 2013. He offered Thierry Ardisson the chance to return to public broadcasting, which he declined. Facing these successive failures, he was dismissed from his position during the weekend of October 19–20, 2013, and replaced by Thierry Thuillier. Thierry Ardisson attributes the current difficulties of France 2 to this director, explaining that he never wanted to make room for a well-regarded "cultural" program.

Since 2014, he has been the producer of the Téléthon for France Télévisions.
