= Laurent Delahousse =

French journalist (born 1969)

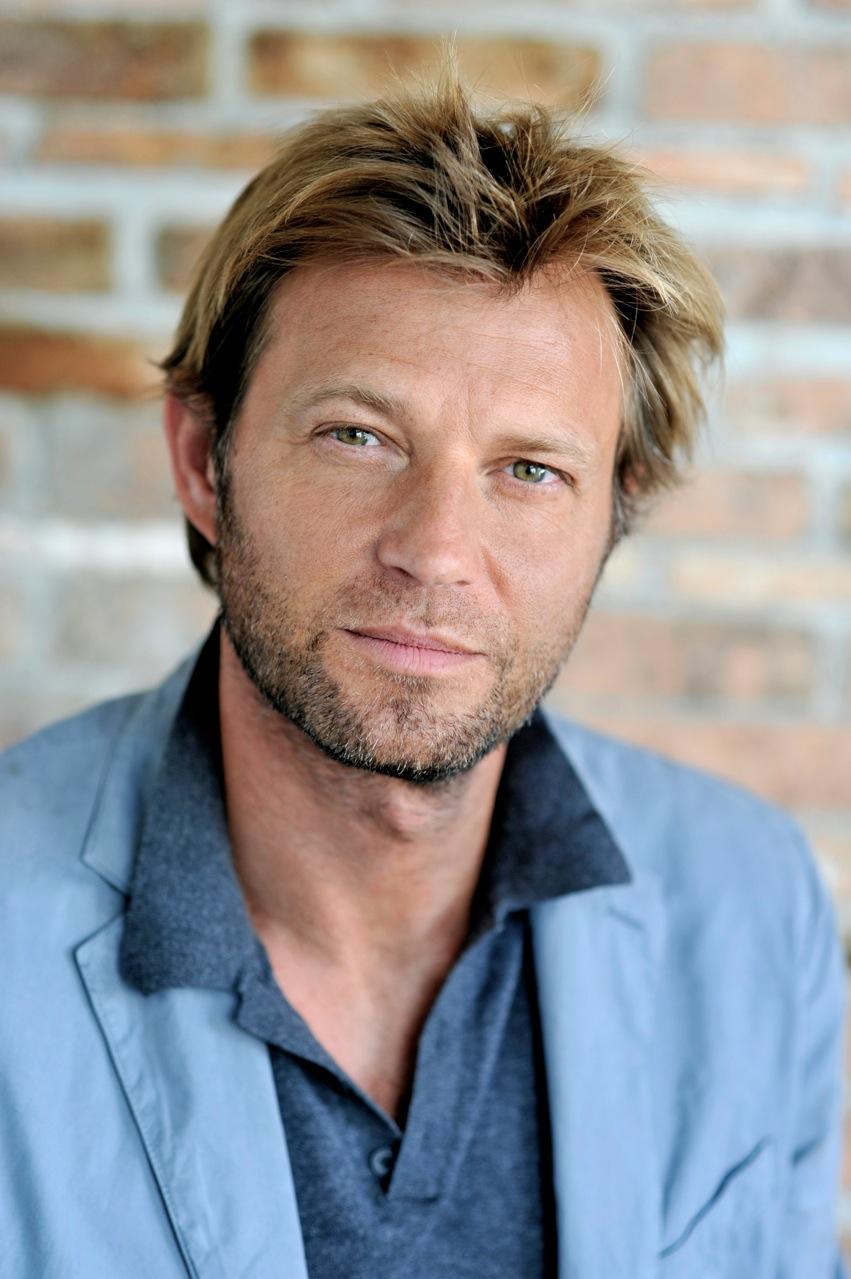
- Delahousse in 2013
- Born: 30 August 1969 (age 56); Croix, France
- Occupations: Journalist; Documentary filmmaker
- Notable credit(s): Journal de 20 heures Un jour, un destin

Laurent Delahousse (French pronunciation: [lɔʁɑ̃ dəlaus]; born 30 August 1969) is a French journalist and documentary filmmaker. He is best known for hosting the Journal de 20 heures news bulletin and Un jour, un destin biographical show, both on France 2.

== Education ==
Delahousse holds a master's degree in business and labour law, as well as a DEA in private sector law (the North-American equivalent of which would be an LL.M.).

== Career ==
In 1994, he began his career at RTL, France's number 1 radio, as a political correspondent. In 1996, he joined LCI, TF1's all-news channel. In 1999, he joined M6 as its chief editor and presenter of the newsmagazine De quel droit? (By what right?), followed by Jour J (D-Day).

Since March 2000, he has been co-editor-in-chief and presenter of Secrets de l'actualité (News Secrets). Since 2001, he has also been a presenter for evening news specials such as the one on the 2003 invasion of Iraq.

In September 2006, he joined France 2 where he replaced Carole Gaessler as fellow newspresenter David Pujadas' anchor on the 8pm newscast.

Since January 2007, Delahousse has hosted his own show, Un jour, un destin, a documentary series profiling key figures who have made a lasting impression on the public.

From February to June 2007, he also presented a weekly political show, Un dimanche de campagne.

On 25 February 2007, Laurent Delahousse was chosen to host the week-end news.

Since September 2007, he has been presenting a weekly current affairs show called 13h15.

In 2017-18, Delahousse hosted 19h le dimanche on Sundays.
