= Antoine Cormery =

French journalist

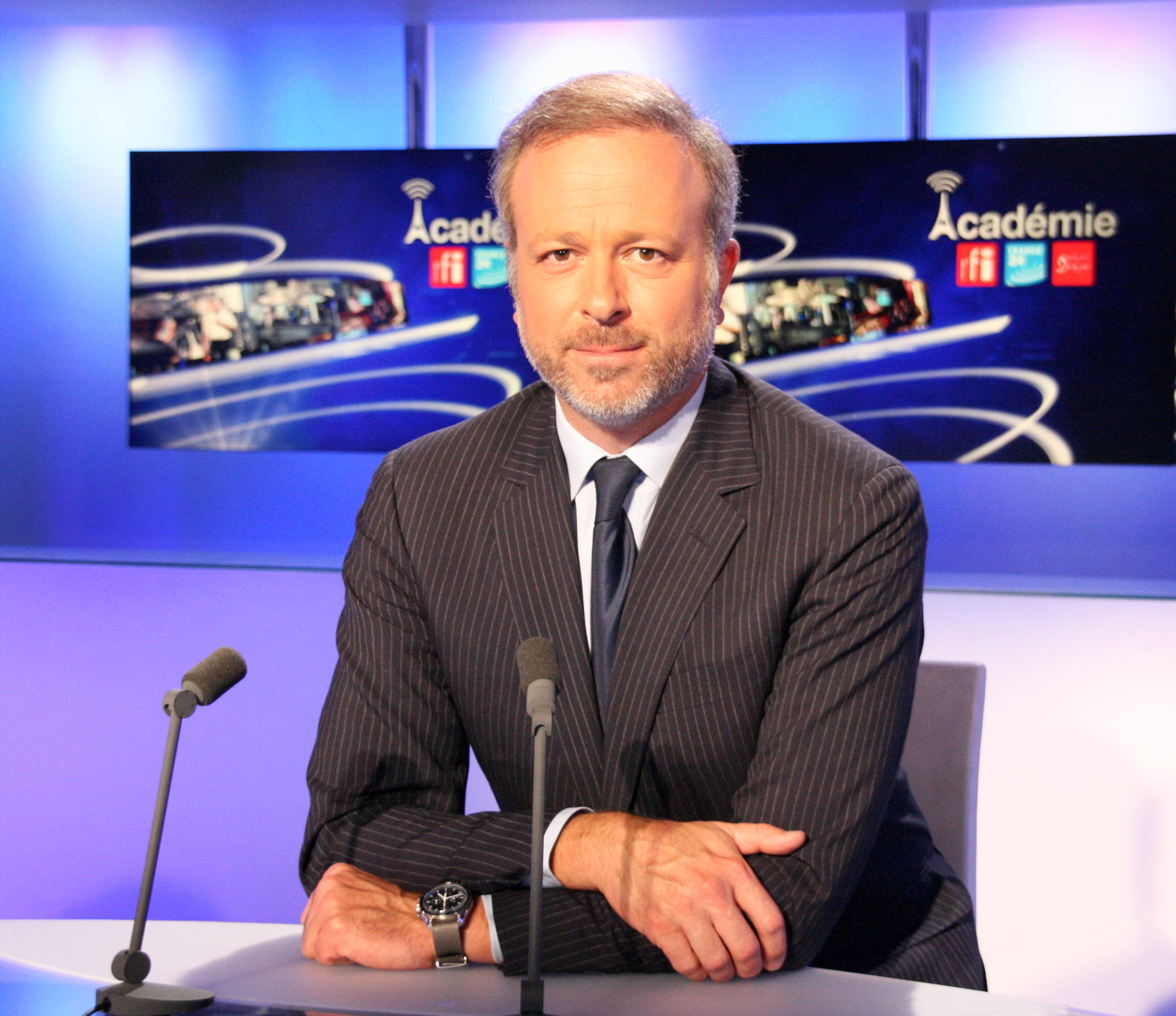
A. Cormery

Antoine Cormery is a French journalist who works at France 24, a French international non-stop news TV channel since 2006.

Antoine Cormery graduated from Centre de formation des journalistes (the national centre for education in journalism) in Paris, 1991, then worked for AFP and RFI, before being hired by Europe 1 radio station by winning the bourse Lauga competition. in 1992 he joined the general news department of TF1 channel, then M6's Culture pub team, and later France 2, where he worked as a senior reporter for the "Economics" department, before being promoted deputy manager of the "Culture" then "Society" departments. Between 1996 and 2004 he became a substitute presenter of the 1pm news and 8pm news report on France 2 in regular replacement of David Pujadas.

In 2003 he quit France 2 to work in radio again, heading the press review at France Info radio. In the meantime he became deputy manager of the Centre de formation et de perfectionnement des journalistes in charge of the "Audiovisual" section. In December 2006 he participated in the launching of a French international news TV channel broadcasting 24/7: France 24, where he presented the morning session in French and a weekly show devoted to grand reportages called Reporters, as well as some debates and special shows, e.g. Sur la route de Pekin (On the road to Beijing) during the 2008 Summer Olympics, USA 2008 during the 2008 presidential elections in America, and Haïti, un an après (Haiti, one year later). As of September 2009 he started presenting a talk-show, Paris Direct (2 hours of news and debates), and later a new version of the show from 8pm to midnight as of October 2010[1].

Antoine Cormery also trains channel journalists. He regularly intervenes in the training and educational field in France (CFJ, Sciences Po Paris, France 3, RFO, BFM, LCI, NRJ) and worldwide (Radio Nationale Algérienne, Télévision nationale du Mali, Radio Liban, RTBF). He is currently the managing director of Académie France24-MCD-RFI.
