= Thierry Cheleman =

- Born: 1952 (age 73–74)
- Occupation: Television director

Thierry Cheleman, born in 1952, is a French entrepreneur who served as the sports director of Canal+ from 2014 to 2022. Previously, he was the head of information at France Télévisions, director of programming and executive for France 2, and director of sports, theatre, and performing arts at Direct 8.

== Biography ==
Cheleman graduated from the IDRAC Business School in 1974. The same year, he started working at BRED Banque populaire as an account manager. In 1986, he joined Pierre Bellanger at the non-commercial radio station La Voix du Lézard to create Skyrock with Filipacchi Media. Cheleman served as the commercial director and head of special operations at Skyrock until 1988.

He then joined AB Productions as the sponsorship director for the 22 hours of weekly programming provided to TF1.

In 1990, Cheleman joined the French subsidiary of Saatchi & Saatchi, where President Didier Colmet-Dâage decided to create a new department. As the TV sponsorship director, Cheleman was responsible for sponsoring both terrestrial and cable broadcasts as well as short programs.

In 1991, he founded Lifestyle Marketing Group (LMG) with Lucien Boyer, the client director of the advertising agency. The group specialized in sports marketing consulting. Together, they bought all the group's shares in 1995 to remain independent for two years.

In 1998, the company was acquired by Havas Advertising and merged with PB Sport Conseil, Jour J, and Partenariat Innovation Media. The new entity was renamed Havas Advertising Sport 6 in 1999. Cheleman became the media director responsible for short programs, covering sectors including written press, radio, television, and new media.

In 2005, his responsibilities were expanded to communication. In this role, he responded to a request from Yannick Bolloré, the program director of Direct 8, for sports programming on that channel. In 2007, Cheleman was hired by Bolloré Média to implement the proposed strategy. From 2007 to November 2012, as the sports director of Direct 8, he organized the broadcast programming for women's football matches. In 2010, his responsibilities expanded to include Direct Star after the acquisition of Virgin 17 from Lagardère Active, as well as performing arts and theatre starting in early 2012.

In November 2012, he became the sports director of D8 following Bolloré Média's television channels acquisition by Canal+ Group. In September 2015, Cheleman became the sports director of Canal+ Group, replacing Thierry Thuillier.

On July 1st, 2022, Cheleman was replaced by Thomas Sénécal as the sports director of Canal+ Group and continued working until the end of the year on sports partnership projects within Vivendi Group.
