= University of Montpellier Paul Valéry =

French university in the Academy of Montpellier

Paul Valéry University Montpellier 3
- Université Paul-Valéry Montpellier
- UPVM's logo
- Type: Public university
- Established: 1289/1970
- Affiliations: Coimbra Group
- President: Patrick Gilli
- Academic staff: 627
- Students: 19,794
- Location: Montpellier, Béziers, France; 43.633°N 3.870°E
- Campus: Urban
- Sporting affiliations: Service Universitaire des Activités Physiques et Sportives (SUAPS)
- Website: www.univ-montp3.fr

University of Montpellier Paul Valéry (French: Université Paul-Valéry Montpellier III), also known as or UPVM or Montpellier III, is a public research university in Montpellier, France. It is one of the three successor universities of the University of Montpellier. The university specialises in arts, language and social sciences.

The university is a member of the Coimbra Group, an association of long-established European multidisciplinary universities of high international standard.

== History ==
=== Origins ===
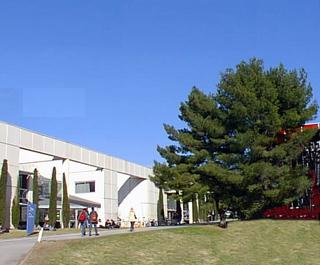
Paul Valéry University

The University of Montpellier, founded on 26 October 1289 through a bull issued by Pope Nicholas IV combining the schools of Medicine, Arts and Law, is the third university founded in France, following those of Paris and Toulouse.

In 1939, the new Faculty of Humanities was built in the city centre, facing Saint Pierre's Cathedral on the rue du Cardinal de Cabrières (currently home to part of the University of Montpellier 1's Law Faculty), and inaugurated by the then Dean Augustin Fliche.

In 1970, the former faculties formed three separate universities (Montpellier I, II and III). The Faculty of Arts, Languages, Social Sciences and Humanities becoming the "University of Montpellier III", whilst also taking on the name of Paul Valéry as a homage to the Sète-born writer who studied in Montpellier.

In 2015, the Universities of Montpellier I and II merged to be the University of Montpellier. Therefore, the University Paul Valéry of Montpellier III became University Paul-Valéry of Montpellier (UPVM).

Since 2002, all Nîmes students have been included in the University of Nîmes and are no longer part of the University of Montpellier III.

=== Presidents ===
List of presidents
Year of appointment	Name	Position	Discipline
1990	Jules Maurin	University Professor	Contemporary History
1995	Pierre Benedetto	University Professor	Psychology
1998	Michèle Weil	University Professor	Literature
2003	Jean-Marie Miossec	University Professor	Geography
2008	Anne Fraïsse	University Professor	Latin
2016	Patrick Gilli	University Professor	Medieval History
2020	Anne Fraïsse	University Professor	Latin

== Campus ==
Having become too cramped, the university moved in 1966 to a campus of over 10 hectares in the north of the city (route de Mende), close to the University of Montpellier II's new campus. In order to avoid confusion with the University of Montpellier 2, the architectural aesthetic was very carefully selected and large green spaces created.

In 1986 a new building comprising three lecture theatres (one seating 800 students) was built.

In 1998, a second University campus was built in Béziers on the site of the former Duguesclin barracks.

A move of the university's UFR 5 (psychology and sociology department) is currently being planned to the Saint-Charles site in Montpellier city centre.

== Organisation ==
The university is organised into six teaching and research units:

- Letters, Arts, Philosophy and Psychoanalysis
- Languages and Cultures
- Human and Environmental Sciences
- Social and Organisational Sciences
- Subject and Societal Sciences - Psychology, sociology and anthropology
- Education - education, physical and sports education, mathematics.

It also has an Institute of Information Technoscience.

== Student life ==
Student life is coordinated through the Maison des Étudiants, a place for students' activities, freedom of expression, clubs and societies.

Its aim is to help students realise their own ambitions, allowing them to open up and develop a place for creation, as well as cultural and campus activities.

The Maison des Étudiants and its "Jean Moulin" function room are an important centre for student life on campus, playing host to: dance, music, theatre and first aid classes, as well as conferences, film screenings, debates, exhibitions, solidarity and cultural days, concerts and student evenings, amongst others.

=== Representative student organisations ===
Following the student elections of 30 and 31 May 2006 (postponed due to the anti-CPE blockades in March) marked by a low level of participation of around 5% (but a strong one from the Béziers campus of nearly 20%), the representative student organisations are as follows:

- Tribune Étudiante, Confédération étudiante, Avis Culturel : 4 elected to the CA, 4 elected to the CEVU
- UNEF : 3 elected to the CA, 3 elected to the CEVU
- Sud étudiant : 3 elected to the CA, 3 elected to the CEVU
- Melting-Pot : 2 elected to the CA, 2 elected to the CEVU, 1 elected to the CS
- Caraïbe Afrique Solidarité Étudiante (The CASE) : 1 elected to the CA, 1 elected to the CEVU
- Corpo Lettres Epsylone : 1 elected to the CA, 1 elected to the CEVU
- UNI : 1 elected to the CA, 1 elected to the CEVU
- La liste Culturelle étudiante : 1 elected to the CEVU
- Association Contact : 1 elected to the CS
- Étudiants solidaires : 1 elected to the CS
- Réseau doctorant UPV : 1 elected to the CS

=== Other active associations ===
All student associations do not inevitably participate in representative student elections but are not less active. Numerous cultural associations, such as Asso7, ECUME or l'Écran et son Double, actively participate in campus activities.

The associations and student unions are housed in the "Maison des Etudiants", found on the north side of campus near the Vert Bois university restaurant.

== Notable people ==
=== Faculty ===
- François Doumenge (1926, Viane, Tarn - 2008) - geographer who specialized in marine and island geography
- Jean Joubert (1928 Châlette-sur-Loing, Loiret - 2015) - novelist, short story writer, and poet
- Larry Portis (1943 in Bremerton, Washington – 2011 in Soudorgues, France) - historian
- Marlène Zarader (1949–2025) - philosopher
- Marc Gabolde (born 1957 Nantes) - Egyptologist
- Burghart Schmidt (born 1962, Hamburg) - historian; university president
- Jean-Christophe Valtat (born 1968) - Modern literature

=== Alumni ===
- Ahmad Kamyabi Mask (born 1944) - professor emeritus of comparative literature and theatrical studies
- Élisabeth Guigou (born 1946, Marrakesh, Morocco) - politician SP
- Colette Mélot (born 1947, Sète) - teacher, politician TR
- Henry Fourès (born 1948, Coursan) - historian of music and musician
- Sonia Marta Mora Escalante (born 1953) - education administrator Costa Rica
- Tahar Rahim (born 1981) - Franco-Algerian actor
- Étienne Leenhardt (born Montpellier) - journalist and editor
- Thierry Ardisson (born 1949, Bourganeuf, Creuse) - television host and movie producer
- Emigdio Flores Calpiñeiro (born 1950, Cobija) - politician and sociologist Bolivia
- Rollie Cook (born 1952, Edmonton, Canada) - politician PC
- Brenda Marie Osbey (born 1957 New Orleans) - American poet
- Laurent Gomina-Pampali (born 1949, Bandoka, Central African Republic) - Central African politician and philosopher

== See also ==
- Cercam
- University of Montpellier
- List of public universities in France by academy
- Coimbra Group
