= Brenda Marie Osbey =

American poet (born 1957)

- Born: December 12, 1957 (age 68); New Orleans, Louisiana, U.S.
- Education: Dillard University; Paul Valéry University Montpellier 3 University of Kentucky (MA)
- Occupation: Poet
- Writing career
- Notable awards: American Book Award (1998)

Brenda Marie Osbey (born December 12, 1957, in New Orleans) is an American poet. She served as the Poet Laureate of Louisiana from 2005 to 2007.

== Life ==
She graduated from Dillard University, Paul Valéry University, Montpellier III, and from the University of Kentucky, with an M.A. She has taught at the University of California at Los Angeles, Loyola University New Orleans, and at Dillard University. She was Visiting Writer-in-residence at Tulane University and Scholar-in-residence at Southern University. She teaches at Louisiana State University.

Her work has appeared in Callaloo, Obsidian, Essence, Southern Exposure, Southern Review, Epoch, The American Voice, and The American Poetry Review.

== Awards ==
- 2004 Camargo Foundation Fellow
- 1998 American Book Award
- 1990 National Endowment for the Arts Creative Writing Fellowship
- 1984 Association of Writers & Writing Programs Poetry Award
- 1980 Loring-Williams Prize, Academy of American Poets

== Works ==
- All Saints: New and Selected Poems. Louisiana State University Press. November 1, 1997. ISBN 978-0-8071-2198-6.
- Desperate Circumstance, Dangerous Woman. Story Line Press. 1991. ISBN 978-0-934257-57-2.
- In These Houses. Wesleyan University Press. September 1, 1988. ISBN 978-0-8195-2146-0.
- Ceremony for Minneconjoux. University Press of Virginia. 1983. ISBN 978-0-912759-03-6.

=== Anthologies ===
- Marge Piercy, ed. (1987). Early Ripening: American Women's Poetry Now. Pandora. ISBN 978-0-86358-108-3.
- Leon Stokesbury, ed. (1999). The Made Thing: An Anthology of Contemporary Southern Poetry. University of Arkansas Press. p. 239. ISBN 978-1-55728-579-9. "Brenda Marie Osbey."
- James Gill, ed. 1987 2PLUS2: A Collection of International Writing, Lausanne, Switzerland: Mylabris Press.
- William L. Andrews, ed. (October 1997). Literature of the American South: A Norton Anthology. W W Norton & Co Inc. ISBN 978-0-393-97270-2.
- Frederick Smock, ed. (1998). "The Evening News". The American voice anthology of poetry. University Press of Kentucky. p. 78. ISBN 978-0-8131-0956-5. "Brenda Marie Osbey."
- Charles H. Rowell, ed. (2002). "Setting Loose the Icons". Making Callaloo: 25 years of Black literature. Macmillan. ISBN 978-0-312-28898-3.
