= L'Émission politique =

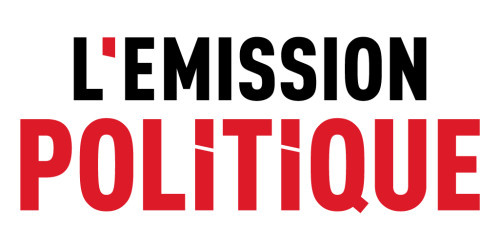
- Directed by: Didier Froehly
- Presented by: Léa Salamé (2016–2019); David Pujadas (2016–2017); Thomas Sotto (2018–2019); Alexandra Bensaïd (2019)
- Starring: Karim Rissouli (2016–2017); François Lenglet (2016–2018); Charline Vanhoenacker (2016–2017); Jean-Baptiste Marteau (2017–2019)
- Country of origin: France
- Original language: French
- No. of seasons: 3
- No. of episodes: 28

Production
- Production locations: Studio Le Franay 48, quai de Président Carnot; 92210 Saint-Cloud
- Running time: 125 minutes

Original release
- Network: France 2
- Release: 15 September 2016 – 22 May 2019

L'Émission politique (English: "The Political Show") is a French political television programme hosted by Léa Salamé broadcast twice a month on France 2 from 15 September 2016 to 22 May 2019. Broadcast during prime time on Thursday evenings, it replaced Des paroles et des actes, which was aired from 2011 to 2016, during the 2017 French presidential election. David Pujadas co-hosted the programme during its first season and Thomas Sotto during its last season.

== List of episodes ==
=== Season 1 ===
No.	Air date	Party	Invitee(s)	Political office(s)	Viewers	MS	%C	Ref(s)
1	15 September 2016	LR	Nicolas Sarkozy	Former President of France, candidate in the 2016 primary of the right and centre	2,697,000	12.6%	38%	
2	22 September 2016	PS	Arnaud Montebourg	Former Minister of the Economy, candidate in the 2017 Socialist primary	1,935,000	8.9%	33%	
3	6 October 2016	LR	Alain Juppé	Former Prime Minister, candidate in the 2016 primary of the right and centre	2,755,000	13.2%	49%	
4	20 October 2016	LR	Bruno Le Maire	Former Minister of Agriculture, candidate in the 2016 primary of the right and centre	1,840,000	8.4%	41%	
5	27 October 2016	LR	François Fillon	Former Prime Minister, candidate in the 2016 primary of the right and centre	2,060,000	9.4%	38%	
6	10 November 2016	The world according to Donald Trump (special episode on the 2016 United States presidential election)			2,100,000	9.1%		
6	10 November 2016	PS	Ségolène Royal	Minister of Ecology	2,100,000	9.1%		
6	10 November 2016	FN	Florian Philippot	Member of the European Parliament	2,100,000	9.1%		
7	8 December 2016	PS	Benoît Hamon	Former Minister of National Education, candidate in the 2017 Socialist primary	1,722,000	8.0%	40%	
8	5 January 2017	PS	Manuel Valls	Former Prime Minister, candidate in the 2017 Socialist primary	1,900,000	8.4%	29%	
9	9 February 2017	FN	Marine Le Pen	Member of the European Parliament, candidate in the 2017 French presidential election	3,480,000	16.7%	41%	
10	23 February 2017	FI	Jean-Luc Mélenchon	Former Senator, Member of the European Parliament, candidate in the 2017 French presidential election	2,718,000	12.6%	37%	
11	9 March 2017	PS	Benoît Hamon	Former Minister of National Education, candidate in the 2017 French presidential election	2,243,000	10.6%	39%	
12	23 March 2017	LR	François Fillon	Former Prime Minister, candidate in the 2017 French presidential election	3,306,000	14.9%	28%	
13	6 April 2017	EM	Emmanuel Macron	Former Minister of the Economy, candidate in the 2017 French presidential election	3,584,000	16.5%	47%	
14	4 May 2017	The two Frances (special episode on the second round of the 2017 French presidential election)			2,236,000	10.0%		
15	18 May 2017	France: the new deal (special episode on the 2017 French legislative elections)			2,091,000	9.6%		
15	18 May 2017	REM	Christophe Castaner	Secretary of State for Relations with Parliament, Government Spokesman	2,091,000	9.6%		
15	18 May 2017	FI	Jean-Luc Mélenchon	Former candidate in the 2017 French presidential election	2,091,000	9.6%		
15	18 May 2017	PS	Benoît Hamon	Former candidate in the 2017 French presidential election	2,091,000	9.6%		
15	18 May 2017	LR	Georges Fenech	Deputy for Rhône's 11th constituency	2,091,000	9.6%		
15	18 May 2017	REM	Jean-Louis Bourlanges	Candidate in the 2017 French legislative elections	2,091,000	9.6%		
15	18 May 2017	LR	Fabienne Keller	Senator for Bas-Rhin	2,091,000	9.6%		
15	18 May 2017	LR	Jean-François Copé	Former candidate in the 2016 primary of the right and centre	2,091,000	9.6%		
15	18 May 2017	SE	Frédéric Mitterrand	Former Minister of Culture	2,091,000	9.6%		
15	18 May 2017	REM	Marie Sara	Candidate in the 2017 French legislative elections	2,091,000	9.6%		
15	18 May 2017	FN	Gilbert Collard	Deputy for Gard's 2nd constituency	2,091,000	9.6%		
–	31 May 2017	Episode cancelled						
–	15 June 2017	Episode cancelled						

=== Season 2 ===
No.	Air date	Party	Invitee(s)	Political office(s)	Viewers	MS	%C	Ref(s)
1	28 September 2017	LR	Édouard Philippe	Prime Minister	3,163,000	14.5%	52%	
2	19 October 2017	FN	Marine Le Pen	Deputy for Pas-de-Calais's 11th constituency, president of the National Front (FN)	1,741,000	7.7%	41%	
3	30 November 2017	FI	Jean-Luc Mélenchon	Deputy for Bouches-du-Rhône's 4th constituency	2,057,000	9.1%	46%	
4	25 January 2018	LR	Laurent Wauquiez	President of The Republicans (LR), president of the regional council of Auvergne-Rhône-Alpes	1,461,000	6.8%	50%	
5	15 February 2018	REM	Jean-Michel Blanquer	Minister of National Education	1,537,000	7.2%	71%	
6	15 March 2018	REM	Gérald Darmanin	Minister of Action and Public Accounts	1,416,000	6.3%	49%	
7	17 May 2018	Macron: one year later (special episode on the first year of Emmanuel Macron as President of France)			1,831,000	8.3%		
7	17 May 2018	REM	Christophe Castaner	General delegate of La République En Marche!, Secretary of State for Relations with Parliament	1,831,000	8.3%	37%	
7	17 May 2018	FN	Marine Le Pen	President of the National Front, deputy for Pas-de-Calais's 11th constituency	1,831,000	8.3%	41%	
7	17 May 2018	FI	Jean-Luc Mélenchon	Founder of La France Insoumise, deputy for Bouches-du-Rhône's 4th constituency	1,831,000	8.3%	47%	
7	17 May 2018	LR	Laurent Wauquiez	President of The Republicans, president of the regional council of Auvergne-Rhône-Alpes	1,831,000	8.3%	44%	
7	17 May 2018	PS	Olivier Faure	First Secretary of the Socialist Party, deputy for Seine-et-Marne's 11th constituency	1,831,000	8.3%	24%	

=== Season 3 ===
No.	Air date	Party	Invitee(s)	Political office(s)	Viewers	MS	%C	Ref(s)
1	27 September 2018	DVD	Édouard Philippe	Prime Minister	2,076,000	11.0%	47%	
2	22 November 2018	SE	Nicolas Hulot	Former Minister for the Ecological and Inclusive Transition	3,220,000	14.9%	65%	
