= Sonia Marta Mora Escalante =

Costa Rican education administrator

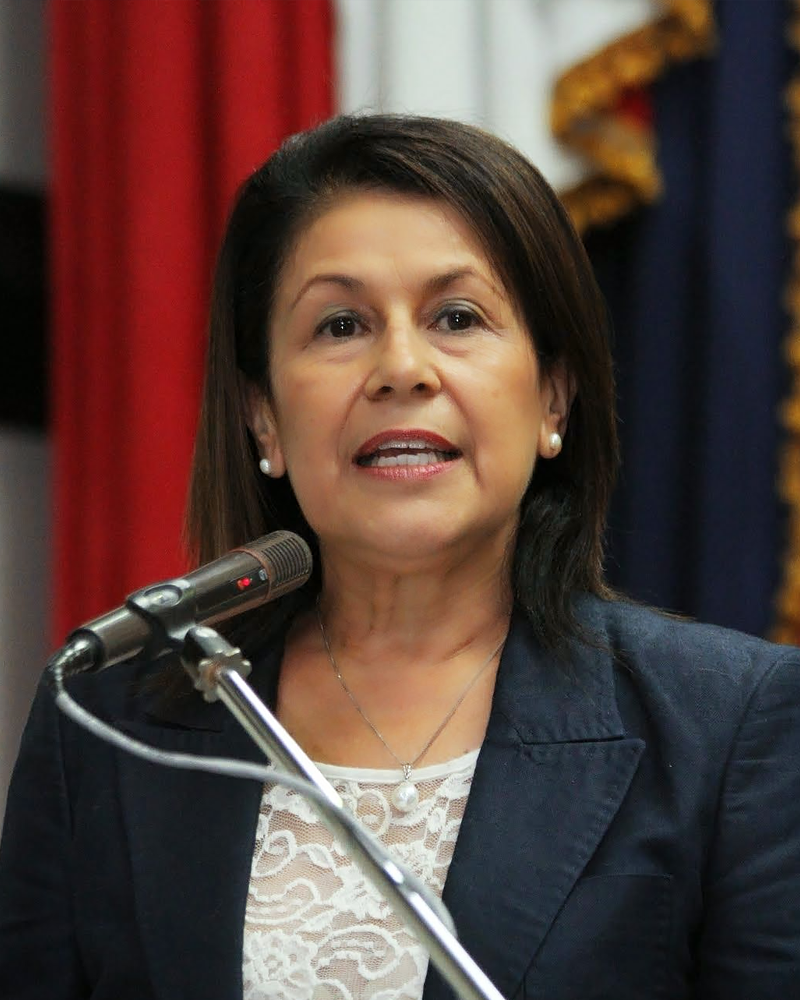

Minister of Education of Costa Rica
- In office May 8, 2014 – May 8, 2018
- President: Luis Guillermo Solís
- Preceded by: Leonardo Garnier Rímolo
- Succeeded by: Edgar Mora Altamirano

Personal details
- Born: July 1, 1953 (age 73) San José, Costa Rica
- Party: Citizens' Action Party
- Spouse: Hernán Mora Corrales
- Children: 3
- Education: University of Costa Rica Université Paul-Valéry

Sonia Marta Mora Escalante (born July 1, 1953) is a Costa Rican education administrator who was Minister of Education of Costa Rica from 2014 to 2018. Previously she was the Dean of Universidad Nacional de Costa Rica and President of SINAES.
