= Anne Fraïsse =

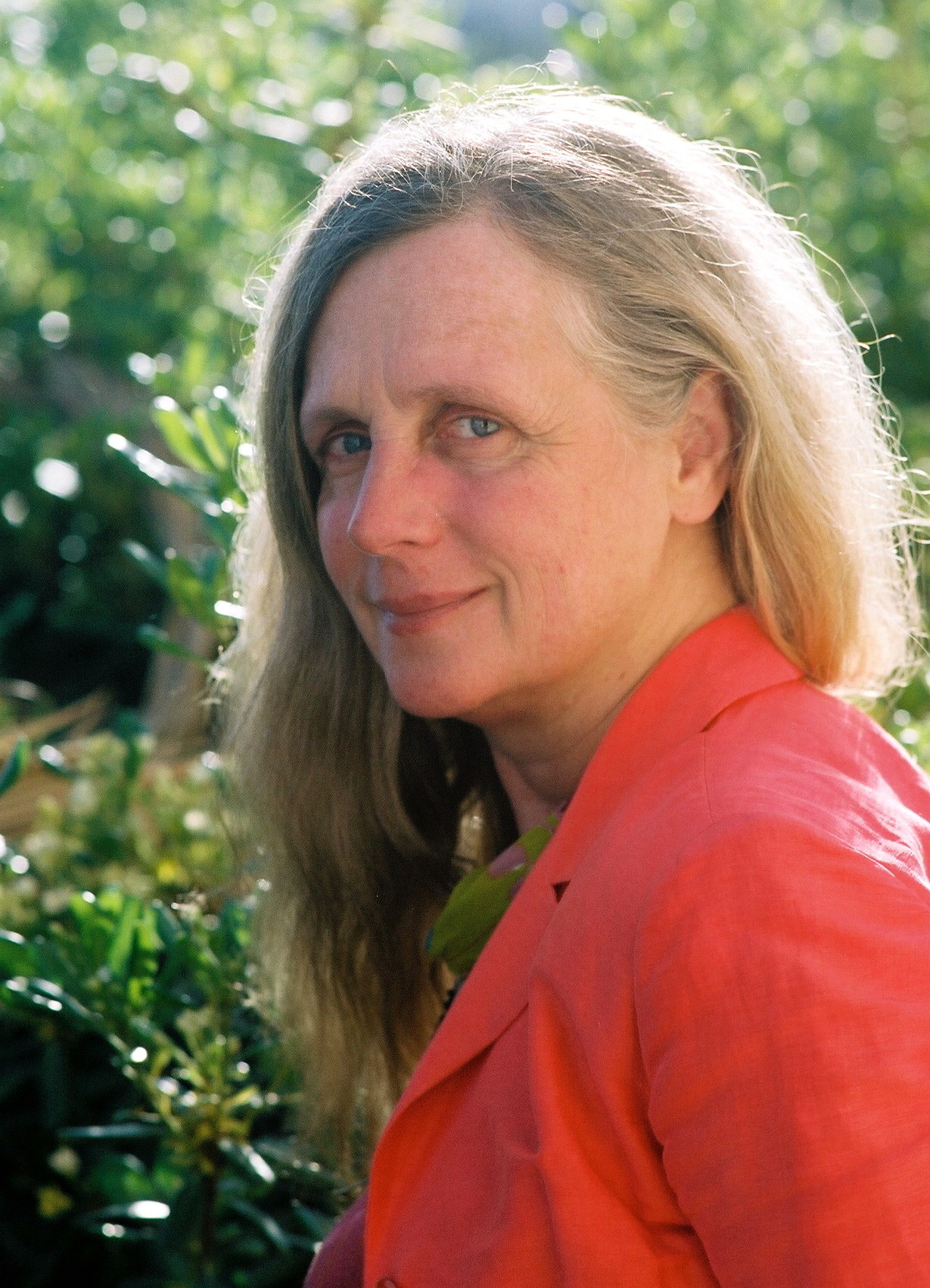
- Born: 1959 (age 66–67); Montpellier, France
- Other name: Anne Fraïsse-Bétoulières
- Occupations: Latinist; academic
- Known for: President, Paul Valéry University Montpellier 3 (UPVM)
- Awards: Legion of Honour; Ordre des Palmes académiques

Academic background
- Education: UPVM
- Thesis: Traduction, notes et commentaire de l'ouvrage de Facundus d'Hermiane Pro Defensione Trium Capitulorum (1992)
- Doctoral advisor: Jacques Flamant

Academic work
- Discipline: Classics
- Institutions: UPVM

Anne Fraïsse (also known as Anne Fraïsse-Bétoulières; born 1959) is a French Latinist and academic. She is a professor of Latin patristics at the Paul Valéry University Montpellier (UPVM). She served two terms as president of the UPVM, from 2008 to 2016, and was re-elected in 2020. She was also vice-president of the France Universités from December 2010 to December 2012.

== Early life and education ==
Anne Fraïsse was born in Montpellier, 1959. After a preparatory class at the Lycée Joffre in Montpellier, Fraïsse studied Classics at the UPVM. She obtained the agrégation de lettres and was appointed as a secondary school teacher. She defended her doctoral thesis, entitled Traduction, notes et commentaire de l'ouvrage de Facundus d'Hermiane Pro Defensione Trium Capitulorum (Translation, notes and commentary on the work of Facundus d'Hermiane Pro Defensione Trium Capitulorum) in 1992, supervised by Jacques Flamant, thanks to a scholarship from the École de Rome.

== Career ==
She was appointed lecturer in Latin in 1994 at the UPVM, a member of the CRISES team. In 2006, Fraïsse was appointed professor at the UPVM. She is the author of several books and scientific articles. Her research focuses on the beginning of the Christian Church and its theological conflicts, as well as the assimilation of Greco-Roman classical culture into Christianity.

Fraïsse was a member of the Board of Directors from 1998 to 2002, and then of the Council of Studies and University Life from 2002 to 2006. She is a member of the Campus Commission, for which she was the rapporteur between 2000 and 2006. Fraïsse was head of the Literature, Arts, Philosophy and Linguistics Department from 2002 to 2008, and was elected president of UPVM in 2008.

During her first presidential term (2008–2012), she co-piloted the Opération Campus project, with the two other universities of Montpellier. Fraïsse is opposed to the LRU.

As president of the university, she participated in the project to merge the three Montpellier universities. Believing that the Humanities and Social science were not sufficiently represented in the project, she left the negotiations during her second term (2012–2016). preferring collegial solutions like the COMUE. She expressed opposition to the government's university policy and to the reduction in state subsidies.

Fraïsse was re-elected for a third time, which began on January 1, 2021.

== Awards and honours ==
- Knight, Legion of Honour (2010)
- Knight, Ordre des Palmes académiques (2004)
