= Laurent Rigal =

French sports journalist

- Citizenship: French
- Occupations: Journalist, Sports commentator
- Employer: Voltage (2001-2003)

Laurent Rigal is a French sports journalist. After working for Motors TV and Eurosport, he joined Canal+ in March 2019. He has been the commentator for MotoGP Grand Prix races alongside Randy de Puniet since March 2022.

== Biography ==
=== Origin and family ===
Laurent Rigal is the son of Hubert Rigal, a former motorcycle racer who finished 6th in the 1973 Bol d'Or. During his adolescence, Laurent raced in the Aprilia Cup. In parallel, he developed a passion for music and became a DJ, particularly performing in beach bars near Soorts-Hossegor during the summer.

=== Career ===
From 2000 to 2002, he attended the radio school Studec. From 2001 to 2003, he hosted shows on the Voltage radio station, particularly presenting the evening show Double F. He also had a stint on Europe 2.

In 2004, he had the opportunity to intern at Motors TV, where he quickly signed a contract. He regularly commented on various motorsports events and also produced segments.

In 2015, he joined Eurosport. He began commenting on Moto2 and Moto3 Grand Prix races.

In 2019, he moved to Canal+, which had just acquired the broadcasting rights for these two categories as well as MotoGP. He is now part of a team including Louis Rossi, Sylvain Guintoli, Marina Lorenzo, Randy de Puniet, and David Dumain. His role is to comment on Moto2 and Moto3 Grand Prix races, similar to what he did at Eurosport.

In early 2022, he was chosen to replace David Dumain in commenting on MotoGP races alongside consultant Randy de Puniet. The other two categories will now be covered by Antoine Arlot. He punctuates each start of the Grand Prix with an exclamation, "Et boum!"

In 2023, his commentary on French rider Johann Zarco's first MotoGP victory was noted.
