= Sibyle Veil =

French official

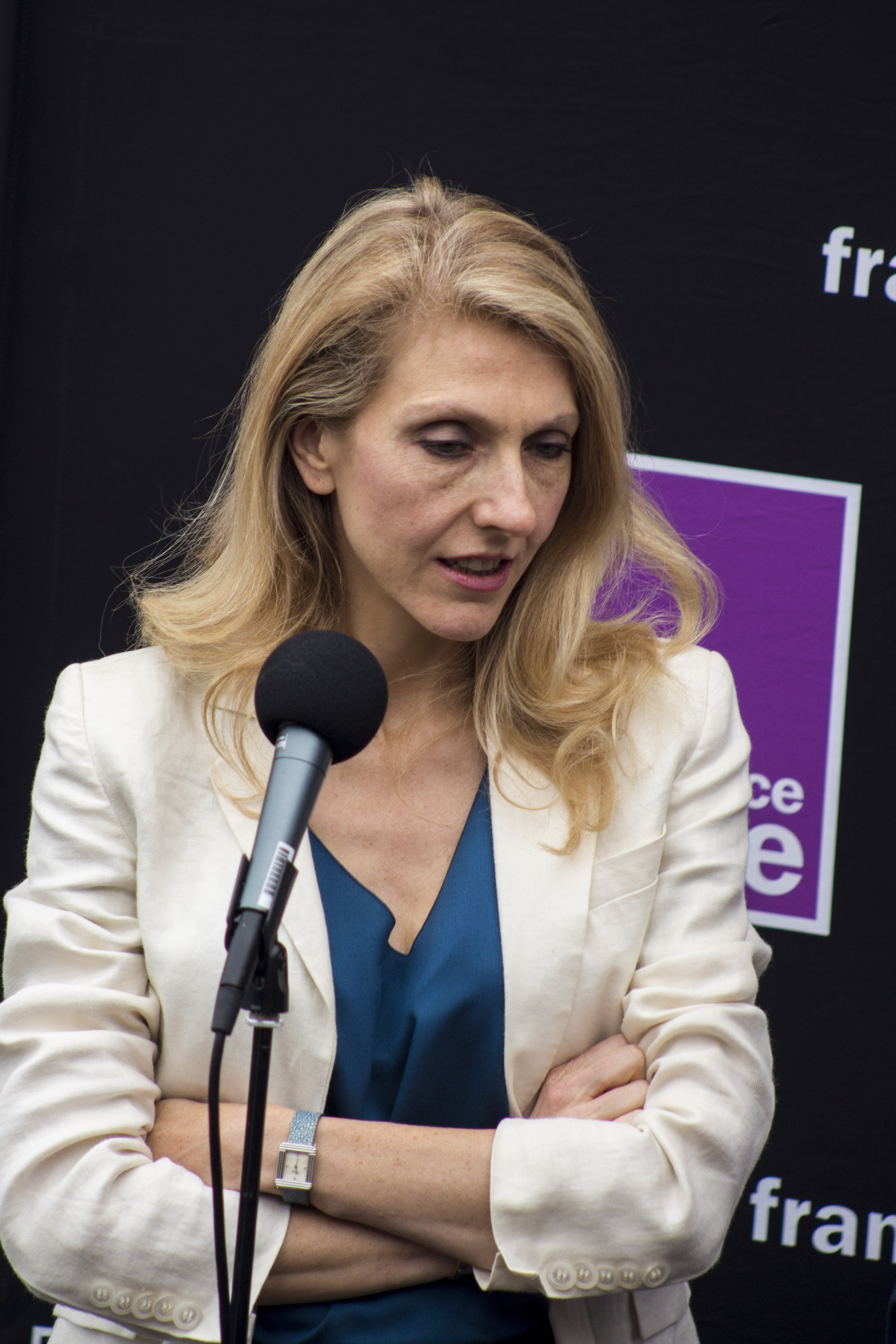
- Sibyle Veil, 2018
- Born: 26 September 1977 (age 48); Langres, France
- Education: Lycée Carnot
- Alma mater: Sciences Po; École nationale d'administration
- Occupation: President of Radio France (2018–present)
- Spouse: Sébastien Veil

Sibyle Veil (born 26 September 1977) is a French telecommunications and media executive. She is the chief executive officer of Radio France.

== Early life ==
Sibyle Petitjean was born on 26 September 1977, in Langres. Her father is an engineer and her mother is a psychologist. She spent a large part of her youth in Dijon. In 2006, she married Sébastien Veil, grandson of Simone Veil. She is a graduate of Sciences Po Paris, holds a DEA in political science and is a former student of the National School of Administration of the promotion "Léopold Sédar Senghor" (2004). One of the first in the ENA competition, she chose to join the Council of State.

== Career ==
During the 2007 presidential campaign, she joined forces with Nicolas Sarkozy and participated in his reflection on societal subjects such as the environment, health, family policy and the status of women.

In 2010, she was a member of the management committee of the Assistance Publique - Hôpitaux de Paris (AP-HP) establishment, director of transformation, she led strategic thinking and organized the deployment of transformation programs in hôpitaux.

Present at Radio France since 2015 as deputy director in charge of operations and finance, she became its president and chief executive officer in April 2018, appointed by the CSA (French Media Regulatory Authority). She was reappointed for a second term in December 2022.

In a February 2025 op-ed in Le Figaro, Sibyle Veil criticizes unlimited freedom of speech as a tool of American imperialist influence, used to destabilize European democracies. Sybile Veil openly opposes U.S. President Donald Trump, Vice President J.D. Vance, and billionaire entrepreneur Elon Musk on the issue, advocating instead for strict speech regulation from European and French institutions and lawmakers.

== See also ==
- Radio in France
- International broadcasting
