= Alexandre Michelin =

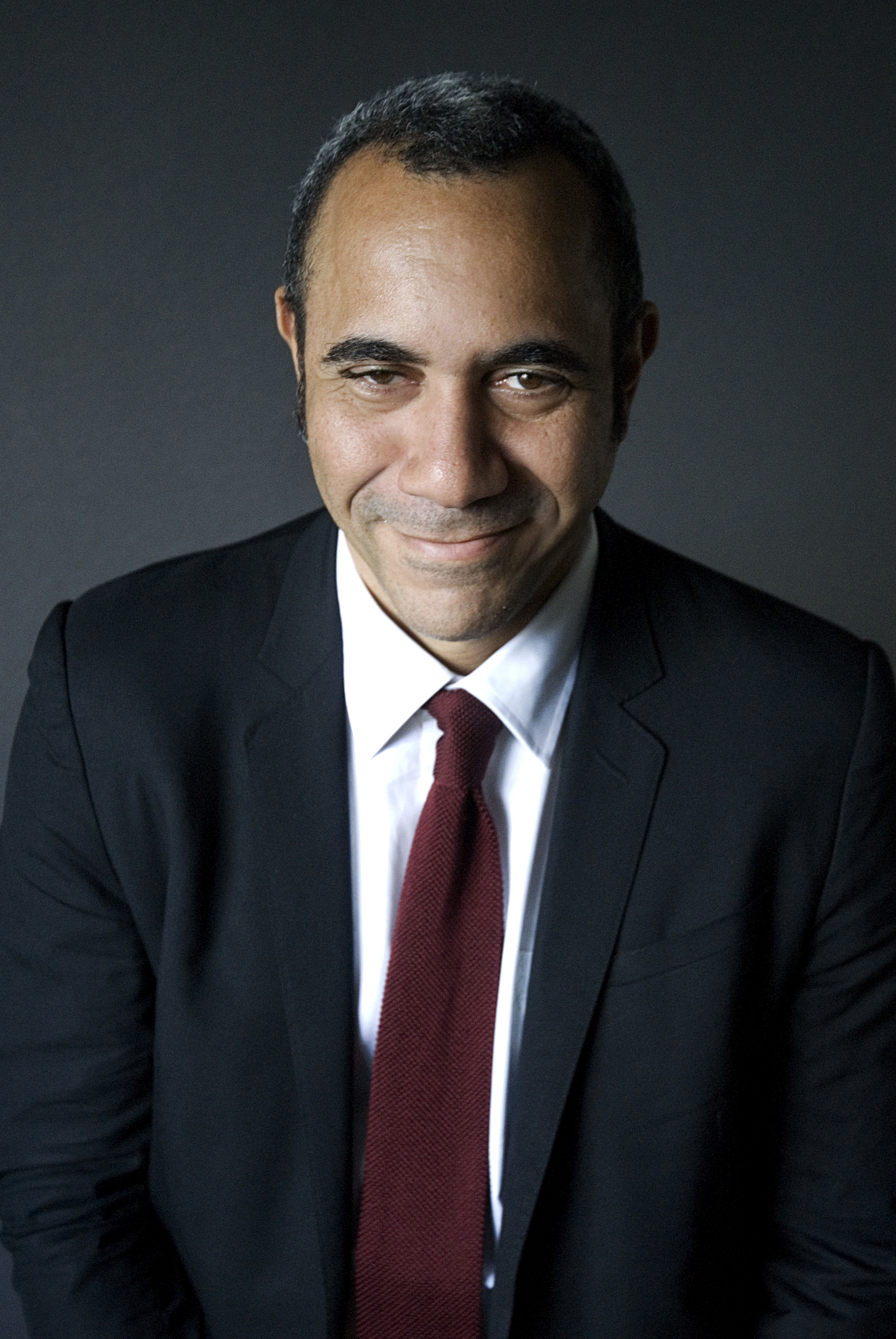
- Born: June 27, 1964 (age 61); Mali
- Citizenship: French
- Education: Sciences Po; ESSEC Business School; Sorbonne
- Occupation: Corporate director

Alexandre Michelin, born on June 27, 1964, in Mali, is a media professional and expert in digital transition. He is the founder of the Knowledge Immersive Forum, which brings together innovators from all immersive realities (AR, VR, XR, etc.) for the benefit of culture and knowledge.

== Career and education ==
He began his career at the television station Paris Première as the Head of Acquisitions in 1988. In 1992, he became the Director of Programs. He launched cultural shows and brought back diverse personalities such as Jean-Edern Hallier, Paul Amar, and Thierry Ardisson to the screen. He contributed to introducing Elisabeth Quint and Jamel Debbouze to the screen. In 1994, he was appointed as the General Manager of Paris Première, becoming the youngest channel director.

In 1997, he joined the Canal+ Group as the Director of Digital Programs, and in 1998, he was appointed to head the Programming Department of CanalSat, where he was responsible for the Kiosque service. From 2001 to December 2003, he served as the Director of Programs and Services for the Canal+ Group.

Between 2004 and 2006, Alexandre Michelin held the position of Director of Broadcasting and Programs for France 5, notably overseeing its digital transition for free-to-air broadcasting. He created the first interactive television show titled Cult, in which young people could participate from home via webcam. This show was awarded an Emmy Award for the best interactive program of the year in 2006, ahead of the BBC.

In November 2006, he was appointed President of the Images de la Diversité Fund, created by the ACSÉ and the Centre national du cinéma et de l'image animée (Decree no 2007-181 of February 9, 2007 establishing the Images de la Diversité Commission - Order of February 13, 2007 appointing members to the Images de la Diversité Commission). In June 2010, his term as President of the Images de la Diversité Commission was renewed for 3 years. In 2013, he was reappointed for another 3 years by the Minister of Culture, Aurélie Filippetti. In December 2015, he joined the College of Diversity created by Fleur Pellerin.

=== Digital intrepreneur ===
In February 2007, he became the Editorial and Content Director of MSN.fr (Microsoft Group). He reorganized content development and forged strategic partnerships with Canal+, L'Équipe, and Figaro Madame. He also launched the M6/MSN website.

Since August 2010, he has been in charge of MSN Europe, Africa, and the Middle East. He is responsible for content, programming, development, strategy, and monetization. The portal has established itself as the number one in 18 of the 25 markets where it is present.

On February 25, 2015, after Serge Cimino, a journalist at France 3, he became the second candidate to declare his candidacy for the position of President of France Télévisions, with selection conducted by the CSA. His campaign was based on the need to lead the digital transformation of France Télévisions to make public broadcasting a producer of content adapted for the digital age.

=== Digital entrepreneur ===
In December 2015, he joined Spicee, a digital media platform for documentaries and in-depth reporting, as General Director.

In 2017, he founded the investment company NOV-Entreprises!, which supports actors in immersive realities and facilitates the immersive transition for companies in cultural and creative industries.

To help the immersive industry reach its full potential, he created and hosts the Knowledge Immersive Forum in 2021, a hybrid platform that fosters synergies between immersive practitioners, cultural institutions, and local authorities.

In 2020, he accepted the presidency of the Digital Experiences Commission at the Centre National du Cinéma et de l'Image Animée.

== Awards ==
Alexandre Michelin was promoted to Officer of the Ordre des Arts et des Lettres in January 2012.
