= Un œil sur la planète =

Un œil sur la planète (English: An Eye on the Planet) is a French television quarterly geopolitical newsmagazine show that ran on Channel France 2 from 2002-2017. Directed throughout the entire run by Patrick Boitet, the show was presented by Thierry Thuillier from 2002 to 2008, by Étienne Leenhardt from 2008 to 2015 and by Samah Soula from 2016 to 2017. After the 9/11 attacks, France 2 editor-in-chief Olivier Mazerolle desired to air a program to better understand less-known places on the globe. The program's format by week zeroed in on a specific nation or region, and offered four or five reports detailing cultural, economic, or geopolitical issues within, with ground reporting and little in-studio segments. The program routinely achieved a 10% audience share, with an all-time high of 20.8%. It was cancelled in 2017.
