= Journal de 20 heures =

Daily French television news program

- French: Journal de 20 heures
- Genre: Television news
- Presented by: Jean-Baptiste Marteau; Laurent Delahousse; Aurélie Casse; Sonia Chironi; Alexandra Bensaïd; Béatrice Schönberg (weekend edition; 1997–2007)
- Country of origin: France
- Original language: French

Production
- Production locations: Headquarters of France Télévisions (since 1998); Rue Florian Delbarre/Avenue Montaigne (from 1981 to 1998); Rue Cognacq-Jay (before 1981)
- Running time: 35-40 minutes (weekdays); 30 to 40 minutes (weekends)

Original release
- Network: France 2
- Release: January 6, 1975 – present

The Journal de 20 heures (The 8pm Journal), also known as 20 heures and symbolized as 20h on-screen, is a French television news program that broadcasts at 8pm every evening on France 2, as its name suggests. This program is the successor of 24 heures actualités, 24 heures sur la Deux, and INF 2 which have been broadcast successively since 15 September 1967 on television.

== History ==
The abolition of the ORTF on 31 December 1974 led to the beginning of the public service channel Antenne 2, which emerged from the division of the Office, to create a new editorial office bringing together most of the former journalists of INF 2 and others from the former editorial offices of the first or third channel. The new editor-in-chief, Jacques Sallebert, installed Le Journal d'Antenne 2 every evening at 8 p.m. on 6 January 1975, with Jean-Michel Folon as the first to be credited. Jean-Marie Cavada was the first presenter.

In 1976, Jacques Sallebert entrusted the presentation to Patrick Poivre d'Arvor, who developed the audience for this information event, but who was to share the presentation of this edition with Christine Ockrent in 1983. Bernard Rapp and Claude Sérillon succeeded them from 1985 to 1987, then Henri Sannier from September 1987. In September 1988, he was replaced by Christine Ockrent (whose companion, Bernard Kouchner, was then minister).

On 7 September 1992, Antenne 2 became France 2 and the Managing Editor entrusted Paul Amar, who had previously been responsible for the presentation of FR3's 19/20, with the presentation of the Journal de 20 heures de France 2. He was dismissed following a pathetic debate he organized between Bernard Tapie and Jean-Marie Le Pen in June 1994. He was replaced by Bruno Masure and Daniel Bilalian who would present the journal alternately.

In 2001, the new Chief Information Officer Olivier Mazerolle recruited David Pujadas, from LCI, to present the Journal de 20 heures. Viewership increased from 22% in 2001 to 24.7% of PDMs in 2004.

On Monday, September 22, 2014, the program achieved its best audience since the end of March (excluding summer) with five million viewers and a 20.2% market share.

On Thursday, June 8, 2017, David Pujadas presented 20 Heures for the last time. The editorial staff reserved a tribute of nearly ten minutes for him. David Pujadas said goodbye at the end of the newspaper, cheered by the editorial staff and his family, including Léa Salamé who was present. The newspaper has a strong audience with nearly 5.5 million viewers, with a peak at 7.1 million viewers, and a 25.8% market share.

As of Sunday, September 10, 2017, after 20 Heures, for about 30 minutes on Sundays comes 20h30 le dimanche with guests.

== Presenters ==
The newspaper is presented during the week, from Monday to Thursday, by Jean-Baptiste Marteau. On weekends, 20 Heures is presented, from Friday to Sunday, by Laurent Delahousse.

During absences or holidays, Jean-Baptiste Marteau is replaced by Aurélie Casse and Laurent Delahousse is replaced by Sonia Chironi.

In 2018, Alexandra Bensaïd replaced François Lenglet.

== Controversies ==
In December 2012, the Actuchomage website published an article in which it criticized 20 Heures for participating in the stigmatization of the unemployed and being pro-Medef.

In 2014, Bruno Masure criticized the presenter David Pujadas for the place he gave to "criminal miscellaneous facts" and for having transformed the TV news "into a neo-liberal propaganda outlet, with subtle, repetitive and totally open promotion".

== Polemics ==
In December 2016, 20 Heures stated that a bar in the municipality of Sevran (Seine-Saint-Denis) was banned for women, generating many debates on the rise of communitarianism. Later, the Bondy Blog showed that this was not the case (the establishment serves alcohol and welcomes clients), which other journalists confirmed.

== See also ==
- France 2
