= David Pujadas =

French journalist and television presenter (born 1964)

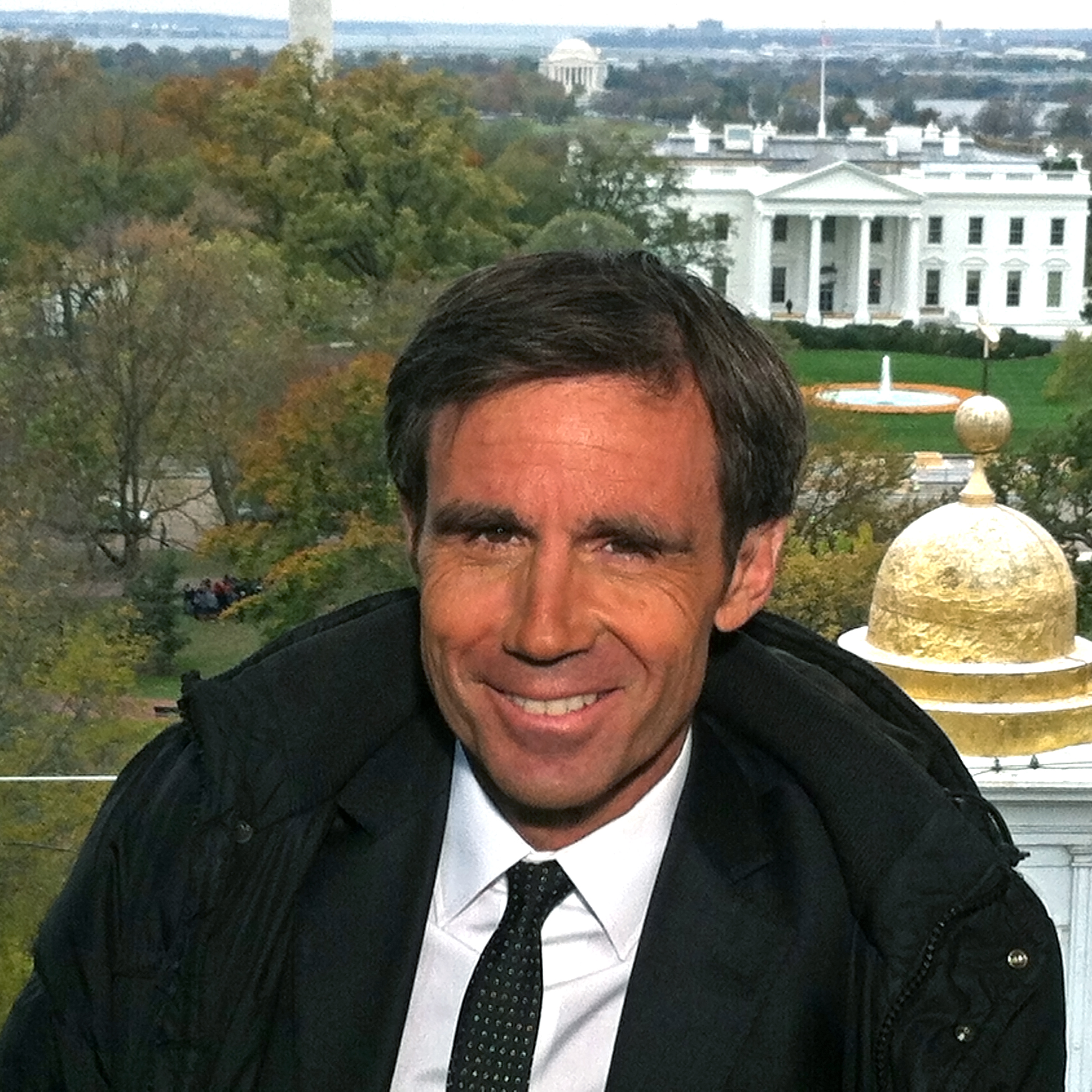
- Pujadas in Washington, DC, 2012
- Born: 2 December 1964 (age 61); Barcelona, Spain
- Education: Aix-Marseille University; Sciences Po; CFJ
- Known for: News broadcaster for TF1's LCI; News anchor for France 2's weeknight newscast (former)
- Notable credit(s): Journal de 20 heures Les Infiltrés; 24H Pujadas
- Spouse: Ingrid Pujadas

David Pujadas (French: [david pyʒadas], Catalan: [dəˈβit puˈʒaðəs]; born 2 December 1964) is a French journalist and television host.

A news presenter for TF1's LCI daily news programme, 24H Pujadas, at 18:00 CET, he was an anchorman on France 2's weeknight newscast, Le Journal de 20 Heures, at 20:00 CET, both in Metropolitan France. He has anchored these newscasts since September 2001, when he replaced Claude Sérillon, on orders from Olivier Mazerolle, the new France 2 news director. On 17 May 2017, Pujadas was let go and presented his last news report on the 8 June 2017.

The newscasts Pujadas presented were repeated in Canada on TV5 Monde weeknights at 18:30 North American Eastern Time⁣, and in Australia on SBS at 08:40 on weekdays.

In Metropolitan France, the audience for France 2's flagship evening newscast, at 20%, was less than the 26% audience share garnered by Laurence Ferrari's TF1 evening newscast.

David Pujadas has gone to the Middle East for interviews of the Iranian and Syrian Presidents.

== Biography ==
David Pujadas first went to the Lycée International de Ferney-Voltaire for high school before graduating from the University of Aix-Marseille and Sciences Po, then he entered Paris' Centre for Journalist Training (CFJ) in 1988.

Winner of a reporters' contest conducted by TF1, he became a foreign correspondent there, covering most notably the fall of Nicolae Ceausescu in Romania in 1989, the Gulf War in 1991, and the siege of Sarajevo in 1992. He also presented the morning news and the 23:00 news during holidays of the regular presenters between 1992 and 1993.

At the same time, from 1990 to 1994, he carried out research for Charles Villeneuve's investigative magazine “Le droit de savoir”.

At the end of June 1994, he joined LCI, TF1's new continuous news channel, where he presented newscasts regularly. Starting in September 1996 he handled the presentation of "Le Grand Journal” from 18:00 to 19:00. He also created the weekly magazine 100% politique.

In September 2001, he replaced Claude Sérillon as presenter of France 2's 20:00 news at the request of the new news director Olivier Mazerolle and covered the 9/11 events live on French television.

On February 3, 2004, Pujadas announced in the opening of his news programme Alain Juppé's official withdrawal from political life. While at the same moment, Juppé stated at the end of a long interview on the TF1 show that he would give up his mandates over the course of the next year. Pujadas made his apologies for this error in the edition of the following day. But two days later, following a vote of no confidence by the channel's directors, he was sanctioned with two weeks of forced vacation, during which he was replaced by his stand-in, Carole Gaessler. On February 11, 2004, Olivier Mazerolle tendered his resignation and was replaced by Arlette Chabot as head editor of France 2.

During the 2005–2006 season, Pujadas presented “Le Contrat”, a monthly political interview on the Parliamentary Channel. He has hosted “Madame, Monsieur, bonsoir” weekly with Herve Chabalier on France 5 since February 2006.

During the 2012 French presidential election, he presented Des paroles et des actes (Words and Deeds), a broadcast in which candidates were confronted to their public image, their economic program, their possible strategies for campaign and to an opposition politician. He has also co-presented with Laurence Ferrari the televised debate between François Hollande and Nicolas Sarkozy. Des paroles et des actes continued until 2016, when it was superseded by L'Émission politique during the 2017 French presidential election, which he co-hosted with Léa Salamé.

The French director of France Télévisions decided on May 17, 2017, to remove him from his anchorman position at the end of the season in order of a renewal in the second most watched newscast despite his good performances.

David Pujadas is a member of the think tank Le Siècle.
