= Arlette Chabot =

French journalist (born 1951)

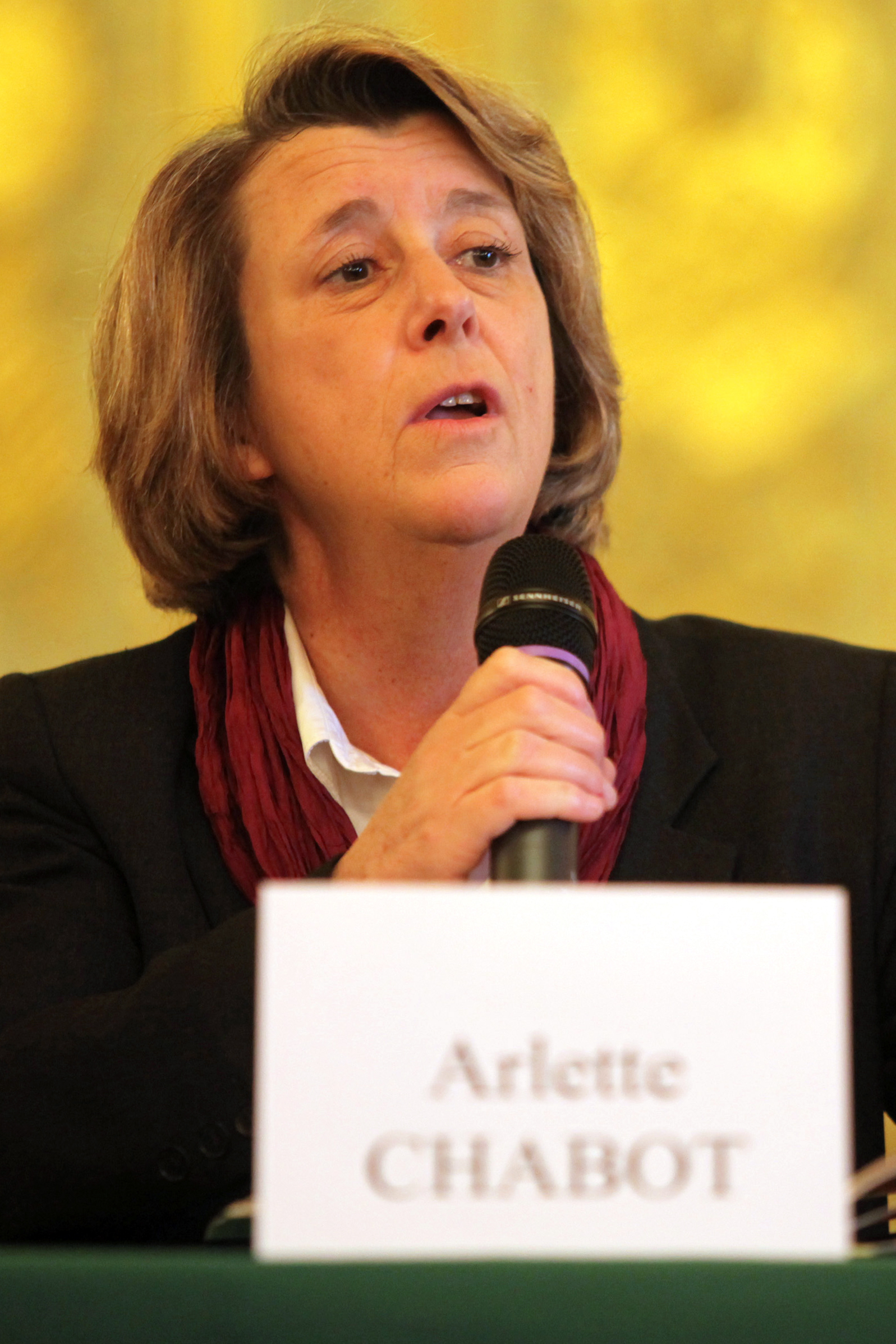
- Arlette Chabot in 2009
- Born: 21 July 1951 (age 75); Chartres, France
- Occupation: Television journalist
- Employers: Europe 1; France 2; LCI

Arlette Chabot (French: [aʁlɛt ʃabo]; born 21 July 1951) is a French journalist and political commentator. She was until August 2010 the head of the editorial team of France 2. In March 2011 she moved to the radio station Europe 1 to become head of news and information.

Chabot began her career at France Inter in 1974, where she was a speaker and headed the political services of the redaction. In 1984, she joined TF1 and headed its political service until 1990. She joined FR3 and became head redactor of the political and economical service. From 1992, she held the same office at France 2. From 1994 to 1998, she was deputy director of the redaction of France 2.

She animated the debate show Mots Croisés from September 1997 to September 2005, when she was replaced by Yves Calvi.

From February 2004 until February 2011, Arlette Chabot was director of the editorial team of France 2, replacing Olivier Mazerolle. She has also hosted the show À vous de juger on France 2 since September 2005.

Chabot was one of the journalists (along with Patrick Poivre d'Arvor) who moderated the 2 May 2007 French presidential debate between Ségolène Royal and Nicolas Sarkozy for the presidential election.

== Honours ==
- Officer of the Legion of Honour (July 2017).
