= France 2 =

French TV channel launched on 10 September 1959

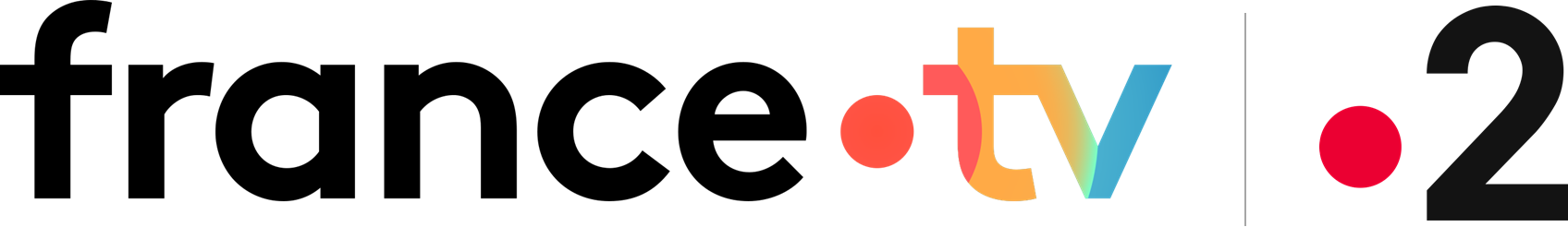
- Logo used subsequently since 6 June 2025
- Country: France
- Broadcast area: France, Andorra, and Monaco, reaching bordering regions via overspill of the French terrestrial network

Programming
- Picture format: 2160p UHDTV; (downscaled to 1080i for the HDTV feed)

Ownership
- Owner: France Télévisions (Government of France)
- Sister channels: France 3 France 4 France 5 France Info

History
- Launched: 21 December 1963; 62 years ago
- Former names: Deuxième chaîne de la RTF (1963-1964); Deuxième chaîne (couleur) de l'ORTF (1964–1975); Antenne 2 (1975–1992)

Links
- Website: www.france.tv/france-2

Availability

Terrestrial
- TNT: Channel 2 (HD); Channel 52 (UHD)
- TNT in Overseas France: Channel 2 or 3 or 4

France 2 (French: [fʁɑ̃s dø]) is a French free-to-air public television channel. The flagship channel of France Télévisions, it broadcasts generalist programming including news, entertainment (such as dramas, films, and game shows), factual programmes, and sports. It is headquartered alongside its sister networks at France Télévisions' headquarters in the 15th arrondissement of Paris, along the Seine.

The channel began test broadcasts on 10 September 1959 and officially launched on 18 April 1964 as RTF Télévision 2, under the control of Radiodiffusion-Télévision Française (RTF). RTF was succeeded by the Office de Radiodiffusion Télévision Française (ORTF) in 1964. On 6 January 1975, ORTF was dissolved and split into multiple independent organisations under government control, with the channel operating as Antenne 2. In 1992, the channel merged with FR3 under the new organisation France Télévision, and was renamed France 2. In 2000, France 2 and France 3 were merged with the remaining public channels under the present-day France Télévisions.

France 2 is broadcast nationally via TNT digital terrestrial television in high- and ultra-high-definition, while it is also carried by all cable, satellite, and IPTV providers. It is also streamed on France.tv, while some of its programmes are broadcast internationally by TV5Monde.

== History ==
Test broadcasts began on 10 September 1959. They were transmitted from the Eiffel Tower on channel 12 to broadcast experimental programmes. The channel was scheduled to start on 2 January 1960 on VHF channels 10 and 12. Originally under the ownership of the RTF. However, broadcasts on neighbouring channels led to constant errors, with reception being ruined in one of the two assigned frequencies. This prompted RTF to reserve the UHF band for the service. The channel went on the air for the first time on 18 April 1964 as RTF Télévision 2. Within a year, ORTF rebranded that channel as La deuxième chaîne (The Second Channel). Originally, the network was broadcast on 625-line transmitters only in preparation for the discontinuation of 819-line black & white transmissions and the introduction of colour. The switch to colour occurred at 14:15 CET on 1 October 1967, using the SECAM system. La deuxième chaîne became the first colour television channel in France. TF1 would not commence colour broadcasting on 625-lines until 1 September 1975. Such technology later allowed the network to air programming in NICAM stereo (compatible with SECAM).

The present channel is the direct successor of Antenne 2, established under a 1974 law that mandated the breakup of ORTF into seven distinct organisations. Three television "programme corporations" were established on 6 January 1975 – TF1, Antenne 2 and FR3, now France 3 – alongside Radio France, the Société française de production, the public broadcasting agency Télédiffusion de France and the Institut national de l'audiovisuel (INA). Antenne 2 and the other corporations were constituted as limited companies with the state controlling 100% of their capital. Although the three channels were set up as competitors vying for advertisers, they retained a collective monopoly over television broadcasting in France that was not repealed until 1981. Privately owned channels such as Canal+ and La Cinq (now superseded by France 5) soon became major competitors to the state-owned channels after the state monopoly was lifted. The breakup of ORTF had been intended to stimulate competition between the public channels but failed in this aim; both TF1 and Antenne 2 came to rely on a diet of popular entertainment shows alongside cheap American imports, seeking to maximise ratings and attract advertisers.

TF1 was privatised in 1987, radically affecting the balance of the French television market. The remaining state-owned channels came under severe pressure from their private competitors and lost 30% of their market share between 1987 and 1989. In an effort to save them, a single director-general was appointed to manage both Antenne 2 and FR3 and the two channels merged to form the France Télévisions group. They were renamed on 7 September 1992 as France 2 and France 3 respectively.

In 1995, the combined audience share of the two state-owned channels was 41%, with France 2 in particular being heavily dependent on advertising and sponsorship revenues, which comprised 43.8% of its budget by 1996. The focus on ratings led to strong rivalry with TF1, for instance prompting the two channels to broadcast popular shows and news programmes in the same timeslots. TF1 and France 2 compete for the same demographics; dramas (including American imports), game shows and light entertainments form the dominant mix on both channels.

Since 3:20 CET on 7 April 2008, all France 2 programming has been broadcast in 16:9 widescreen format over the French analogue and digital terrestrial television. An HD simulcast feed of France 2 has been broadcasting on satellite provider CanalSat since 1 July 2008 and on digital terrestrial television since 30 October 2008.

In January 2024, the channel began broadcasting in 4K UHD.

== Logos ==
Upon becoming Antenne 2, the channel carried a start-up and closedown animation, created by Jean-Michel Folon, and was used for nearly an entire decade.

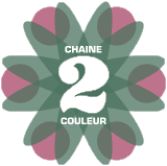
The logo of ORTF 2 from 1972 until 1975

Logo of Antenne 2 (1977-1986; logo remained in use for startup/closedown montage until 1990)

Logo of France 2 from 7 September 1992 till 6 January 2002

Logo of France 2 from 7 January 2002 till 7 April 2008

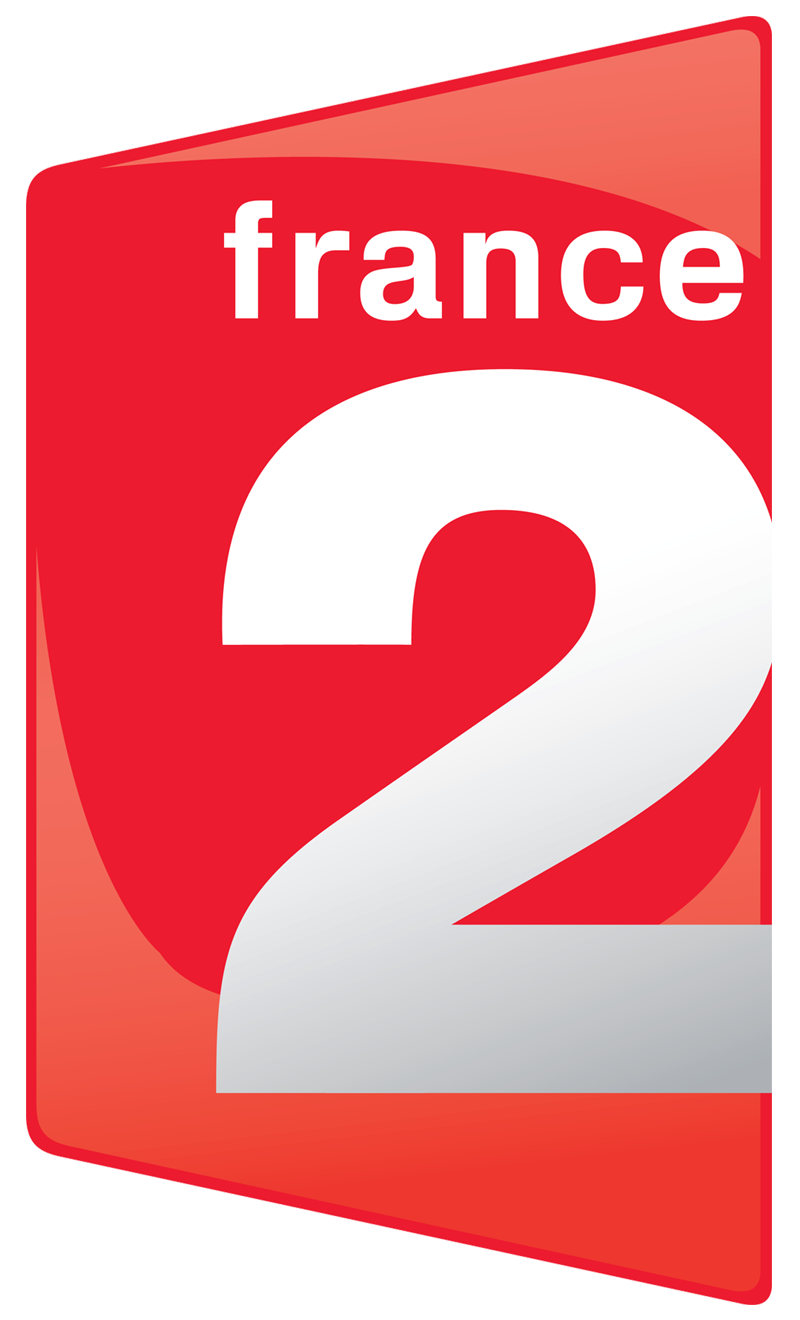
Logo of France 2 from 7 April 2008 till 29 January 2018

Above, but with the text "HD" on the right.

Logo of France 2 from 29 January 2018

On-screen logo of France 2 from 29 January 2018

The France TV logo has been used on the screen since 6 June 2025.

== Leaders of France 2 ==
General President-Director

- Since 7 September 1992, the general President-Director of France 2 has governed over both France 2 and France Télévision.

General Directors

- Georges Vanderchmitt (September 1992 – January 1994)
- Raphaël Hadas-Lebel (January 1994 – June 1996)
- Michel Pappalardo (June 1996 – June 1999)
- Michèle Cotta (June 1999 – June 2002)
- Christopher Baldelli (June 2002 – September 2005)
- Philippe Baudillon (September 2005 – December 2007)
- François Guilbeau (December 2007 – August 2010)
- Claude-Yves Robin (August 2010 – 2 October 2011)
- Bertrand Mosca (3 October 2011 – 2 April 2012)
- Jean Réveillon (since 2 April 2012)

Program Directors

- Jean-Pierre Cottet (14 June 1996 – 20 July 1998)
- Patrice Duhamel (20 July 1998 – ?)
- François Tron (July 2001 – 1 October 2004)
- Yves Bigot (1 October 2004 – 1 September 2005)
- Jean-Baptiste Jouy (1 September 2005 – 20 January 2007)
- Éric Stemmelen (20 January 2007 – 1 July 2009)
- Alain Vautier (1 July 2009 – 14 September 2011)
- Perrine Fontaine (2008 – 28 September 2012)
- Philippe Vilamitjana (2 April 2012 – 21 October 2013)
- Thierry Thuillier (since 21 October 2013)

Information Directors

- Jean-Luc Mano (December 1993 – June 1996)
- Pierre-Henri Arnstam (June 1996 – September 2000)
- Gérard Leclerc (September 2000 – July 2001)
- Olivier Mazerolle (July 2001 – March 2004)
- Arlette Chabot (March 2004 – 19 August 2010)
- Thierry Thuillier (20 August 2010 – 21 October 2013)
- Yannick Letranchant (since 21 October 2013)

Writing Directors

- Éric Monier (2010–2015)
- Michel Dumoret (since March 2021)

Sports Directors

- Jean Réveillon (1992–1998)
- Patrick Chêne (1999–2000)
- Charles Biétry (2000–2001)
- Frédéric Chevit (2001–2005)
- Daniel Bilalian (since March 2005)

== International availability ==
=== Italy ===
From 1975, Antenne 2 was available in Italy (regions of Tuscany, Lazio, Lower Veneto and parts of Lombardy and Liguria) using SECAM and since 1983 using PAL until 2003 when the frequencies were sold to various television networks such as Canale Italia and Gruppo Editoriale L'Espresso.

On 11 December 2006, France 2 was again made available across Italy on Digital terrestrial television until 7 June 2007, when it was replaced by all-news French TV network France 24.

France 2 is now only available in Aosta Valley due to Italian self-government laws, and in the border zones because of natural spillover.

=== Tunisia ===
In 1989, RTT 2 shut down and was replaced by a full-time relay of Antenne 2/France 2. The channel was frequently censored for certain content. For four years in the 1990s, the Sunday morning religious programmes were replaced by pre-recorded documentaries seen on TV5. Other frequently-censored topics included sexuality and certain news coverage, such as reports on the Gulf War and news critical of Tunisia.

== Climate issues ==
=== Information about climate change in weather forecasts ===
In February 2023, 2 state TV channels, France 2 and France 3 have begun to enter information regarding climate change in their weather forecasts. This will make the forecasts 1.5–2 minutes longer. The climate related information will rely on experts. The channels will also provide information about climate change and the ways to counter that to their workers. In France, except in case of breaking news they will ask reporters to take the train instead of a plane.

== Controversies ==
=== Lebanese Civil War kidnapping of Antenne 2 news team ===
In March 1986, an Antenne 2 news team was kidnapped in Beirut while reporting on the Lebanese Civil War. Philippe Rochot, Georges Hansen, Aurel Cornéa and Jean-Louis Normandin were four of many Western hostages held by terrorists during the conflict. During the opening sequences of Antenne 2 news bulletins, the headlines would be followed by a reminder of the French hostages held in Lebanon, including others such as Michel Seurat and Jean-Paul Kaufman, with names, photos and the length of their captivity. Within a year, most of the news team had been released and returned to France, but the reminders continued until all the hostages had been freed.

=== Muhammad al-Durrah shooting ===
On 30 September 2000, France 2 aired the famous footage of the shooting of Muhammad al-Durrah in the Gaza Strip. The scene was filmed by a Palestinian journalist, Talal Abu Rahma, who worked for the station. The voiceover, blaming the killing on fire from the Israeli Defence Forces, was provided by the channel's reporter Charles Enderlin. Subsequently, that account was put in doubt, with others suggesting that the fatal shots could not have come from the IDF position. France 2 later launched libel actions against commentators who alleged that the incident was staged. France 2 won a case against one of those critics, Philippe Karsenty who was eventually and definitely fined €7,000 by the Court of Appeal of Paris in 2013. Karsenty had been convicted in 2006, acquitted on appeal in 2008, a decision that was overturned in 2012 by the Cour de cassation.

=== Gaza War 2009 ===
In January 2009, during the Gaza War, France 2 was accused of airing misleading footage that was biased against Israel. It aired portion of a video that purported to show destruction caused by the Israel Air Force, but was shown to be a different incident from 2005 in which the IDF denied having any involvement. After being alerted to the error by bloggers, France 2 acknowledged the error and formally apologized in the magazine Le Figaro, saying that it was an "internal malfunction" caused by their staff having "worked too fast."

=== 2013 report on weapons smuggling from Serbia to France ===
France 2 has been accused of knowingly producing and airing a news item whose key part it fabricated and staged.

On 7 March 2013, France 2 aired an eight-minute investigative report purporting to expose a weapons smuggling channel from Serbia to France. The report authors, journalists Franck Genauzeau and Régis Mathé, traveled to Serbia in February 2013 where they filmed a story claiming that Serbia is a hub for international weapons smuggling. Among its footage, the report showed two masked men – identified as Serbian weapons smugglers – who talked about their supposed illegal activity while showing off some of the weaponry: in particular two hand guns and one AK-47 Kalashnikov. They're also shown firing off rounds in the woods.

After the report aired, the Serbian police's criminal department (UKP) conducted a month-long investigation, revealing its findings in May 2013 that parts of the French news story were staged with full knowledge of the two France 2 journalists.

According to the police report, Genauzeau and Mathé arrived in Belgrade where they hired a local media fixer named Aleksandar M. who was employed at a Serbian news agency, giving him the task of finding weapons smugglers willing to go before a camera. Aleksandar M. apparently contacted his cousin Nenad Mirković and told him that the French were willing to pay €800 for weapons smugglers. At this point Mirković decided that he himself will appear on camera and also contacted his friend Žarko Blagojević to do the same. In order to make their act more credible, they then obtained two handguns – Zastava 9mm and 7.56mm – from Blagojević's father-in-law and father respectively. They also decided to get an automatic weapon by buying it from a certain Milorad Novaković, a resident of Umka. Apparently, the two first offered him €200, but Novaković wanted €350, at which point they went back to two French journalists asking for more money and getting it.

Coached by Genauzeau and Mathé, the footage featuring masked Blagojević and Mirković was shot at a house owned by Blagojević's friend in Umka. Afterwards, they went into the nearby woods in Duboko near Umka where they fired off a few rounds for the cameras. They then returned the two handguns to Blagojević's father and father in law before selling the Kalashnikov for €100. According to the Serbian police report, Aleksandar M. was paid €300 by the French journalists while Mirković and Blagojević split the €800 between themselves.

Serbian foreign minister Ivan Mrkić reacted to the police report by "seeking explanations from France as the ministry looks to make sure the untruths from the report are clarified".

== Cinema ==
France 2 supports the co-production of feature films through its subsidiary France 2 Cinéma. The company, then known as Films A2, filed its articles of association on 22 December 1980. The company was officially incorporated in 1981, the same year TF1 and S.F.P. established their own subsidiaries specializing in film co-production: TF1 Films Production and Société française de Production cinématographique. France 3 followed with creation of its own subsidiary, France 3 Cinéma, in 1984.

France 2 Cinéma was preceded by ORTF's involvement in the co-production of feature films, which began as early as 1970. ORTF's first investment was René Allio's film, Les Camisards (1972) and it produced approximately 40 other films, including Benoît Jacquot's The Musician Killer (1975), directed by Benoît Jacquot (1974), and Patrice Chéreau's La Chair de l'orchidée (1975). Following the breakup of ORTF, Antenne 2 and FR3 continued this policy. From 1979 onwards, France 2 purchased advance broadcasting rights to films based on script readings. During the period of 1979 to 1980, the channel participated in the financing of 43 feature films. Later, France 2 Cinéma acquired France 2's portfolio of previous investments.
