= Marc Missonnier =

French film producer (born 1970)

- Born: 1970 (age 55–56); Algeria
- Education: Sciences Po; La Fémis
- Occupation: Film producer
- Years active: 1995–present
- Organization: Moana Films

Marc Missonnier (born 1970 in Algeria) is a French film producer. He previously co-headed Fidelité Productions before launching his own production company Moana Films.

== Biography ==
Missonnier first studied at Sciences Po in Paris, where he was heavily involved in the film club. Missonnier then studied in the production department of the prestigious Paris film school La Fémis, from which he graduated in 1996. While at La Fémis, Missonnier met fellow production student Olivier Delbosc, with whom he launched the company Fidélité Productions. Missonnier and Delbosc got their start in the 1990s producing the short films of Francois Ozon, and produced Ozon's feature film debut Sitcom (1998). They co-managed Fidélité for nearly 20 years.

In 2014, he was considered by Télérama, alongside Olivier Delbosc, among the "Top 50" people in French cinema who "have the power and the talent to raise money, create films, make them popular".

In 2015, after nearly 20 years at Fidélité, Missonnier created his own production company Moana Films. As of 2021, Moana Films has produced 10 features including The Odyssey, Django, Knock, Angel Face and Opération Portugal. In 2021, Moana Films partnered with Sony Pictures Entertainment France to launch Parasomnia Productions, a new label dedicated to genre movies in France. Parasomnia will produce small budget features with strong concepts, a structure similar to that of Blumhouse Productions. With a special focus on fantasy, horror, supernatural and mock documentaries, each film will have a budget cap of 1 million euros.

In April 2023, Missonnier criticised the Cannes Film Festival for selecting Catherine Corsini's film Homecoming, which was the subject of controversy due to allegations of on-set misconduct, and called for boycotting the festival on Twitter. On 17 May, he said he discovered, after arriving in Cannes, that his accreditation for the film market had been revoked in retaliation to his call for a boycott. On 18 May, the European Producers Club issued a statement denouncing the revocation, saying "it can be seen as a restriction on freedom of expression". On 22 May, Missonnier reported that his accreditation had been restored.

== Filmography ==
=== Film ===
Year	Title	Credits	Director	Notes	Ref.
1995	La petite mort		François Ozon	Short film	
1996	Les Mésaventures d'Alfred le crapaud – Alléluia		Jon Carnoy	Short film	
1996	Les Mésaventures d'Alfred le crapaud – Double mixte		Jon Carnoy	Short film	
1996	Les Mésaventures d'Alfred le crapaud – Mon prince charmant		Jon Carnoy	Short film	
1996	Les Mésaventures d'Alfred le crapaud – La roue tourne		Jon Carnoy	Short film	
1996	Les Mésaventures d'Alfred le crapaud – Roulette russe		Jon Carnoy	Short film	
1997	Lucas		Jon Carnoy	Short film	
1997	See the Sea	Executive producer	François Ozon	Medium-length film	
1997	Les héros sont debout		Rodolphe Pauly	Short film	
1998	Sitcom		François Ozon		
1998	X2000		François Ozon	Short film	
1999	Criminal Lovers		François Ozon		
2000	Water Drops on Burning Rocks		François Ozon		
2000	Deep in the Woods		Lionel Delplanque		
2000	Under the Sand		François Ozon		
2000	Guedin		Freddy Busso	Short film	
2001	Un jeu d'enfants		Laurent Tuel		
2001	Requiem		Hervé Renoh		
2002	La maîtresse en maillot de bain		Lyèce Boukhitine		
2002	8 Women		François Ozon		
2002	Les Frères Hélias		Freddy Busso	Short film	
2002	Novela	Associate producer	Cédric Anger	Short film	
2002	No debes estar aquí	Associate producer	Jacobo Rispa		
2002	Samouraïs		Giordano Gederlini		
2002	Bloody Mallory		Julien Magnat		
2002	L'Idole		Samantha Lang		
2002	Maléfique		Éric Valette		
2003	Utopía	Associate producer	María Ripoll		
2003	Swimming Pool		François Ozon		
2003	Janis et John		Samuel Benchetrit		
2004	Podium		Yann Moix		
2004	The Hook		Thomas Vincent		
2004	Tout le plaisir est pour moi	Associate producer	Isabelle Broué		
2004	5x2		François Ozon		
2004	The Story of My Life		Laurent Tirard		
2005	Anthony Zimmer		Jérôme Salle		
2005	Time to Leave		François Ozon		
2005	L'Avion		Cédric Kahn		
2005	How Much Do You Love Me?		Bertrand Blier		
2006	Four Stars		Christian Vincent		
2006	Jean-Philippe		Laurent Tuel		
2006	La Jungle	Associate producer	Matthieu Delaporte		
2006	My Best Friend		Patrice Leconte		
2006	The Serpent		Éric Barbier		
2007	Molière		Laurent Tirard		
2007	Angel		François Ozon		
2007	Actrices		Valeria Bruni Tedeschi		
2007	Promise Me This		Emir Kusturica		
2007	I Always Wanted to Be a Gangster		Samuel Benchetrit		
2008	Maradona by Kusturica	Co-producer	Emir Kusturica	Documentary	
2008	Dorothy Mills		Agnès Merlet		
2008	Afterwards		Gilles Bourdos		
2008	Kabuli Kid		Barmak Akram		
2008	Anything for Her		Fred Cavayé		
2008	De l'autre côté du lit		Pascale Pouzadoux		
2009	Enter the Void		Gaspar Noé		
2009	Little Nicholas		Laurent Tirard		
2010	Neds		Peter Mullan		
2010	Toi, moi, les autres		Audrey Estrougo		
2010	La Chance de ma vie		Nicolas Cuche		
2010	The Next Three Days		Paul Haggis		
2011	The Prodigies	Co-producer	Antoine Charreyron		
2011	Chez Gino		Samuel Benchetrit		
2011	Hideaways		Agnès Merlet		
2011	Playoff		Eran Riklis		
2012	Renoir		Gilles Bourdos		
2012	Asterix and Obelix: God Save Britannia		Laurent Tirard		
2013	On My Way		Emmanuelle Bercot		
2013	La Grande Boucle		Laurent Tuel		
2013	A Promise		Patrice Leconte		
2014	In the Name of My Daughter		André Téchiné		
2014	French Women		Audrey Dana		
2014	Nicholas on Holiday		Laurent Tirard		
2014	Do Not Disturb		Patrice Leconte		
2015	The Final Lesson		Pascale Pouzadoux		
2015	Marguerite		Xavier Giannoli		
2016	The Odyssey		Jérôme Salle		
2016	Being 17		André Téchiné		
2016	The African Doctor		Julien Rambaldi		
2017	If I Were a Boy		Audrey Dana		
2017	Django		Étienne Comar		
2017	Knock		Lorraine Lévy		
2018	Les Aventures de Spirou et Fantasio		Alexandre Coffre		
2018	Angel Face		Vanessa Filho		
2019	Qu'un sang impur...		Abdel Raouf Dafri		
2021	Opération Portugal		Frank Cimière		
2021	Little Nicholas' Treasure	Associate producer	Julien Rappeneau		
2023	La Marginale		Frank Cimière		
2023	The Braid		Laetitia Colombani		
2023	Consent		Vanessa Filho		
2024	Opération Portugal 2 - La vie de château		Frank Cimière		
2024	37 : L'Ombre et la Proie		Arthur Môlard		
2024	Christmas Balls	Co-producer	Alexandra Leclère		
2025	La Malédiction des Tahu'a		Benjamin Busnel		
2025	Primavera	Co-producer	Damiano Michieletto		
2026	Kyma, l'onde mystérieuse		Romain Daudet-Jahan		
2026	A Girl's Story		Judith Godrèche		
2026	Microstar	Co-producer	Léopold Kraus		
2026	Jusqu'au bout		Nawell Madani and Ludovic Colbeau-Justin		

=== Television ===
Year	Title	Credit	Notes
2011	Les Beaux Mecs	Executive producer	Miniseries; 6 episodes
2013	La Croisière	Delegate producer	Miniseries; 6 episodes
2016	Beyond the Walls	Executive producer	Miniseries; 3 episodes
2018	HP	Producer	10 episodes
2019	Ronde de nuit	Executive producer	TV movie
2020	Mirage	Producer	Miniseries; 6 episodes
2020	Cheyenne & Lola	Producer	
2022	Neige	Producer	TV movie
2024	Homejacking	Producer	Miniseries; 6 episodes

== Awards and nominations ==
Award	Year	Category	Film	Result	Ref.
BAFTA Scotland	2011	Best Feature Film (shared with Olivier Delbosc and Alain de la Mata)	Neds	Nominated	
César Awards	2009	Best First Film (shared with Fred Cavayé, Olivier Delbosc and Éric Jehelmann)	Anything for Her	Nominated	
César Awards	2016	Best Film (shared with Olivier Delbosc and Xavier Giannoli)	Marguerite	Nominated	
European Film Awards	2002	Best Film (shared with Olivier Delbosc)	8 Women	Nominated	
European Film Awards	2003	Best Film (shared with Olivier Delbosc)	Swimming Pool	Nominated	
