= Olivier Delbosc =

French film producer

- Born: 1968 (age 57–58); Toulouse, France
- Education: La Fémis
- Occupation: Film producer
- Years active: 1994–present
- Spouse: Audrey Dana (m. 2015)

Olivier Delbosc (born 1968 in Toulouse) is a French film producer. He previously co-headed Fidelité Productions before launching his own production company Curiosa Films.

== Biography ==
Delbosc formerly co-managed the company Fidélité Productions with Marc Missonnier, who he met while attending the prestigious Paris film school La Fémis (graduated 1996). Delbosc and Missonnier got their start in the 1990s producing the short films of Francois Ozon, and produced Ozon's feature film debut Sitcom (1998). In 2015, after nearly 20 years at Fidélité, Delbosc created his own production company Curiosa Films, with associate partner Emilien Bignon. Also in 2015, he married the actress and filmmaker Audrey Dana.

In 2014, he was considered by Télérama, alongside Marc Missonnier, among the "Top 50" people in French cinema who "have the power and the talent to raise money, create films, make them popular".

On 17 October 2022, Delbosc was named Chevalier of the Ordre des Arts et des Lettres by Minister of Culture Rima Abdul Malak.

== Filmography ==
=== Film ===
Year	Title	Credits	Director	Notes	Ref.
1994	Action vérité		François Ozon	Short film	
1995	La petite mort		François Ozon	Short film	
1996	Les Mésaventures d'Alfred le crapaud – Alléluia		Jon Carnoy	Short film	
1996	Les Mésaventures d'Alfred le crapaud – Double mixte		Jon Carnoy	Short film	
1996	Les Mésaventures d'Alfred le crapaud – Mon prince charmant		Jon Carnoy	Short film	
1996	Les Mésaventures d'Alfred le crapaud – La roue tourne		Jon Carnoy	Short film	
1996	Les Mésaventures d'Alfred le crapaud – Roulette russe		Jon Carnoy	Short film	
1996	A Summer Dress		François Ozon	Short film	
1997	Lucas		Jon Carnoy	Short film	
1997	See the Sea		François Ozon	Medium-length film	
1997	Les héros sont debout		Rodolphe Pauly	Short film	
1998	Sitcom		François Ozon		
1998	X2000		François Ozon	Short film	
1998	Les jours bleus		Isabelle Broué	Short film	
1999	Criminal Lovers		François Ozon		
1999	Pietas		Pietro Antonio Izzo	Short film	
2000	Water Drops on Burning Rocks		François Ozon		
2000	À corps perdu		Isabelle Broué	Short film	
2000	Under the Sand		François Ozon		
2000	Deep in the Woods		Lionel Delplanque		
2000	Grand Oral		Yann Moix	Short film	
2001	Un jeu d'enfants		Laurent Tuel		
2001	Requiem		Hervé Renoh		
2002	La maîtresse en maillot de bain		Lyèce Boukhitine		
2002	8 Women		François Ozon		
2002	Novela	Associate producer	Cédric Anger	Short film	
2002	Samouraïs		Giordano Gederlini		
2002	Bloody Mallory		Julien Magnat		
2002	L'Idole		Samantha Lang		
2002	Maléfique		Éric Valette		
2003	Utopía	Associate producer	María Ripoll		
2003	Swimming Pool		François Ozon		
2003	Janis et John		Samuel Benchetrit		
2004	Podium		Yann Moix		
2004	The Hook		Thomas Vincent		
2004	Tout le plaisir est pour moi	Associate producer	Isabelle Broué		
2004	5x2		François Ozon		
2004	The Story of My Life		Laurent Tirard		
2005	Anthony Zimmer		Jérôme Salle		
2005	Time to Leave		François Ozon		
2005	L'Avion		Cédric Kahn		
2005	How Much Do You Love Me?		Bertrand Blier		
2006	Four Stars		Christian Vincent		
2006	Jean-Philippe		Laurent Tuel		
2006	La Jungle	Associate producer	Matthieu Delaporte		
2006	My Best Friend		Patrice Leconte		
2006	The Serpent		Éric Barbier		
2007	Molière		Laurent Tirard		
2007	Angel		François Ozon		
2007	Actrices		Valeria Bruni Tedeschi		
2007	Promise Me This		Emir Kusturica		
2007	I Always Wanted to Be a Gangster		Samuel Benchetrit		
2008	Maradona by Kusturica	Co-producer	Emir Kusturica	Documentary	
2008	Dorothy Mills		Agnès Merlet		
2008	Afterwards		Gilles Bourdos		
2008	Kabuli Kid		Barmak Akram		
2008	Anything for Her		Fred Cavayé		
2008	De l'autre côté du lit		Pascale Pouzadoux		
2009	Enter the Void		Gaspar Noé		
2009	Little Nicholas		Laurent Tirard		
2010	Neds		Peter Mullan		
2010	Toi, moi, les autres		Audrey Estrougo		
2010	La Chance de ma vie		Nicolas Cuche		
2010	The Next Three Days		Paul Haggis		
2011	The Prodigies		Antoine Charreyron		
2011	Chez Gino		Samuel Benchetrit		
2011	Hideaways		Agnès Merlet		
2011	Playoff		Eran Riklis		
2012	Renoir		Gilles Bourdos		
2012	Asterix and Obelix: God Save Britannia		Laurent Tirard		
2013	On My Way		Emmanuelle Bercot		
2013	La Grande Boucle		Laurent Tuel		
2013	A Promise		Patrice Leconte		
2014	In the Name of My Daughter		André Téchiné		
2014	French Women		Audrey Dana		
2014	Nicholas on Holiday		Laurent Tirard		
2014	Do Not Disturb		Patrice Leconte		
2015	The Final Lesson		Pascale Pouzadoux		
2015	Marguerite		Xavier Giannoli		
2016	The Odyssey		Jérôme Salle		
2016	Being 17		André Téchiné		
2016	The African Doctor		Julien Rambaldi		
2017	If I Were a Boy		Audrey Dana		
2017	Django		Étienne Comar		
2017	The Midwife		Martin Provost		
2017	Let the Sunshine In		Claire Denis		
2017	Knock		Lorraine Lévy		
2017	Momo		Vincent Lobelle and Sébastien Thiery		
2018	Les Aventures de Spirou et Fantasio		Alexandre Coffre		
2018	The Apparition		Xavier Giannoli		
2018	Amoureux de ma femme		Daniel Auteuil		
2018	Black Tide		Erick Zonca		
2018	Sofia		Meryem Benm'Barek-Aloïsi		
2018	Paris Pigalle		Cédric Anger		
2019	Farewell to the Night		André Téchiné		
2019	All Inclusive		Fabien Onteniente		
2019	Heavy Duty		Bertrand Blier		
2019	Curiosa		Lou Jeunet		
2020	Profession du père		Jean-Pierre Améris		
2021	Between Two Worlds		Emmanuel Carrère		
2021	A Radiant Girl		Sandrine Kiberlain		
2021	Mystère à Saint-Tropez		Nicolas Benamou		
2021	Lost Illusions		Xavier Giannoli		
2021	The Accusation		Yvan Attal		
2021	Waiting for Bojangles		Régis Roinsard		
2021	Little Nicholas' Treasure		Julien Rappeneau		
2022	Hommes au bord de la crise de nerfs		Audrey Dana		
2022	Both Sides of the Blade		Claire Denis		
2022	Stars at Noon		Claire Denis		
2023	Soul Mates		André Téchiné		
2023	The Taste of Things		Trần Anh Hùng		
2023	All to Play For		Delphine Deloget		
2023	The Braid		Laetitia Colombani		
2023	Making Of		Cédric Kahn		
2023	Breaking Point		Yvan Attal		
2023	Open Season		Frédéric Forestier and Antonin Fourlon		
2024	Suspended Time		Olivier Assayas		
2024	The Quiet Son		Delphine and Muriel Coulin		
2024	Le Choix		Gilles Bourdos		
2024	4 Zéros		Fabien Onteniente		
2025	La Chambre de Mariana		Emmanuel Finkiel		
2025	Certains l'aiment chauve		Camille Delamarre		
2025	The Wizard of the Kremlin		Olivier Assayas		
2025	The Fence		Claire Denis		
2025	Le Million		Grégoire Vigneron		
2025	Chasse gardée 2		Frédéric Forestier and Antonin Fourlon		
2026	LOL 2.0		Lisa Azuelos		
2026	Les Rayons et les Ombres		Xavier Giannoli		
2026	Les Misérables		Fred Cavayé		

=== Television ===
Year	Title	Credit	Notes
2011	Les Beaux Mecs	Executive producer	Miniseries; 6 episodes
2013	La Croisière	Delegate producer	Miniseries; 6 episodes
2016	Beyond the Walls	Executive producer	Miniseries; 3 episodes
2018	HP	Producer	10 episodes
2019	Ronde de nuit	Executive producer	TV movie
2023–2024	Of Money and Blood	Producer	Miniseries; 12 episodes

== Awards and nominations ==
Award	Year	Category	Film	Result	Ref.
BAFTA Scotland	2011	Best Feature Film (shared with Alain de la Mata and Marc Missonnier)	Neds	Nominated	
César Awards	2009	Best First Film (shared with Fred Cavayé, Éric Jehelmann and Marc Missonnier)	Anything for Her	Nominated	
César Awards	2016	Best Film (shared with Marc Missonnier and Xavier Giannoli)	Marguerite	Nominated	
European Film Awards	2002	Best Film (shared with Marc Missonnier)	8 Women	Nominated	
European Film Awards	2003	Best Film (shared with Marc Missonnier)	Swimming Pool	Nominated	
