= Valérie Deseine =

French film editor

Valérie Deseine is a French film editor who has worked on films including Me, Myself and Mum, Molière, Game of Four, Le Petit Nicolas, Asterix and Obelix: God Save Britannia, Nicholas on Holiday, Au nom de ma fille, Up for Love, and Fanny's Journey.

== Filmography ==
Year	Title	Director	Notes
1996	Allegro	Nicolas Salis	Short
1996	Bernie	Albert Dupontel	Assistant editor
1996	Lucky Punch	Dominique Ladoge	Trainee assistant editor
1998	Marie from the Bay of Angels	Manuel Pradal	
1998	En désespoir de cause	Vincent Loury	Short
1999	La fourmi	Anthony Souter	Short
2000	La parenthèse enchantée	Michel Spinosa	
2000	Facteur risque	Fabrice Maruca	Short
2002	Fais-moi des vacances	Didier Bivel	Consultant
2002	La maîtresse en maillot de bain	Lyèce Boukhitine	
2003	Ginostra	Manuel Pradal	
2004	Inquiétudes	Gilles Bourdos	
2004	The Story of My Life	Laurent Tirard	
2005	My Angel	Serge Frydman	
2005	Le plus beau jour de ma vie	Julie Lipinski	
2006	Jean-Philippe	Laurent Tuel	
2006	Les volets	Lyèce Boukhitine	Short
2007	Molière	Laurent Tirard	
2007	Game of Four	Bruno Dega	
2009	Afterwards	Gilles Bourdos	
2009	Little Nicholas	Laurent Tirard	
2010	Sans laisser de traces	Grégoire Vigneron	
2011	La Chance de ma vie	Nicolas Cuche	
2011	Nobody Else but You	Gérald Hustache-Mathieu	
2012	Parlez-moi de vous	Pierre Pinaud	
2012	Un jour mon père viendra	Martin Valente	
2012	Asterix and Obelix: God Save Britannia	Laurent Tirard	
2013	Me, Myself and Mum	Guillaume Gallienne	César Award for Best Editing
2014	Nicholas on Holiday	Laurent Tirard	
2015	Boomerang	François Favrat	
2016	Kalinka	Vincent Garenq	
2016	Up for Love	Laurent Tirard	
2016	Fanny's Journey	Lola Doillon	
2017	Maryline	Guillaume Gallienne	
2017	Sophiloscope	Daisy Sadler	Short
2017	Oblomov	Guillaume Gallienne	TV movie
2018	Larguées	Eloïse Lang	
2018	Little Tickles	Andréa Bescond & Eric Métayer	Nominated - César Award for Best Editing
2019	The Mystery of Henri Pick	Rémi Bezançon	
2020	Miss	Ruben Alves	
2020	Mama Weed	Jean-Paul Salomé	
2021	Eiffel	Martin Bourboulon	
2021	Mystère	Denis Imbert	
2021	The Speech	Laurent Tirard	
2021	The Rose Maker	Pierre Pinaud	
2022	Maria rêve	Lauriane Escaffre & Yvo Muller	
2022	Le tourbillon de la vie	Olivier Treiner	
2023	The Sitting Duck	Jean-Paul Salomé	
2023	Quand tu seras grand	Andréa Bescond & Eric Métayer	
2023	Abbé Pierre – A Century of Devotion	Frédéric Tellier	
2026	Women on Trial (L'Affaire Marie-Claire)	Lauriane Escaffre, Yvo Muller	
