= Little Nicky (disambiguation) =

Little Nicky is a 2000 comedy film starring Adam Sandler.

Little Nicky may also refer to:

- Little Nicky (video game), a 2000 video game based on the film
- Little Nicky (cat), a cat believed to be the first successful feline cloning for commercial reasons
- Little Nikki (born 1996), British singer-songwriter
- Nicodemo Scarfo (1929–2017), known as "Little Nicky" the head of the Philadelphia crime family

== See also ==
- Nicky Little (born 1976), Fijian rugby union player
- Le Petit Nicolas, a series of French children's books first published in 1959
  - Le Petit Nicolas (TV series), a 2009 French animated TV series based on the books
  - Little Nicholas, a 2009 French-Belgian family comedy film based on the books
