= Jean-Philippe (film) =

2006 film by Laurent Tuel

- Directed by: Laurent Tuel
- Screenplay by: Laurent Tuel; Christophe Turpin
- Produced by: Olivier Delbosc; Marc Missonnier
- Starring: Fabrice Luchini; Johnny Hallyday; Guilaine Londez; Antoine Duléry
- Cinematography: Denis Rouden; Catherine Pujol
- Edited by: Valérie Deseine
- Music by: André Manoukian
- Distributed by: Mars Distribution
- Release date: 5 April 2006 (France/Belgium)
- Running time: 90 minutes
- Country: France
- Language: French
- Budget: $14.6 million
- Box office: $8.6 million

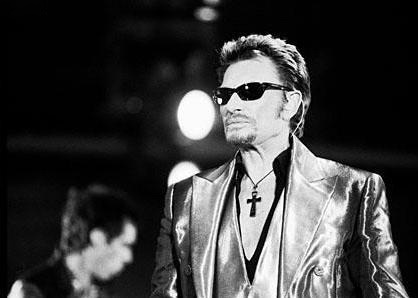
Johnny Hallyday (2003)

Jean-Philippe is a 2006 French film co-written and directed by Laurent Tuel and starring Fabrice Luchini, alongside Johnny Hallyday as a fictional version of himself.

== Premise ==
After an accident, Fabrice, a fan of Johnny Hallyday, falls into a coma and wakes up in a parallel world in which Johnny (using his birth name Jean-Philippe Smet), had abandoned his singing career and never became a star. He convinces Jean-Philippe to become the rock star he should have been.

== Cast ==
- Fabrice Luchini as Fabrice
- Johnny Hallyday as himself
- Guilaine Londez as Babette
- Antoine Duléry as Chris Summer
- Élodie Bollée as Laura/Marion
- Olivier Guéritée as Laurent
- Caroline Cellier as Caroline
- Sophie Cattani as Jennifer
- Benoît Poelvoorde as Bernard Frédéric, a Claude François impersonator
- Jackie Berroyer as the professor
- Jeanne Herry as the bride
- Lise Lamétrie as the walking girl
- Jacky Nercessian
