= Little Nicholas =

- French theatrical release poster
- Directed by: Laurent Tirard
- Screenplay by: Laurent Tirard; Grégoire Vigneron; Alain Chabat
- Story by: Laurent Tirard; Grégoire Vigneron
- Based on: Le petit Nicolas by René Goscinny; Jean-Jacques Sempé
- Produced by: Olivier Delbosc; Marc Missonnier; Genevieve Lemal; Alexandre Lippens
- Starring: Maxime Godart; Kad Merad; Valérie Lemercier
- Cinematography: Denis Rouden
- Edited by: Valérie Deseine
- Music by: Klaus Badelt
- Production companies: Fidélité Productions; Wild Bunch; M6 Films; Mandarin Films; Scope Pictures
- Distributed by: Wild Bunch Distribution
- Release date: 30 September 2009
- Running time: 90 minutes
- Countries: France; Belgium
- Language: French
- Budget: €21.4 million
- Box office: $62.8 million

Little Nicholas (French: Le Petit Nicolas), also known as Petit Nicolas (UK), is a 2009 family comedy film directed by Laurent Tirard, who co-wrote with Grégoire Vigneron and Alain Chabat. It is based on a series of children's books by René Goscinny and Jean-Jacques Sempé. The film features an ensemble cast led by Maxime Godart in the title role of Nicolas. The film was theatrically released in France on 30 September 2009 by Wild Bunch Distribution, Central Film, and EOne Films.

The film received mostly positive reviews from critics and earned $100.8 million on a €21.4 million budget. It won the French Television of Ontario (TFO) Prize for Best Youth Film at the Cinéfranco in 2010 and also received nominations for the 35th César Awards for Best Adaptation, the European Film Award for People's Choice Award for Best European Film, and the Cinema Brazil Grand Prize for Best Foreign-Language Film. A sequel, Nicholas on Holiday, was released on 9 July 2014.

== Plot ==
Nicholas' class is instructed by their teacher to write about what they want to be when they grow up. Gluttonous best friend Alceste, rich boy Geoffrey, dimwitted Clotaire, quarrelsome Eudes, eccentric Rufus and spoiled top student Agnan already have plans for the future. However, Nicholas is unsure as he enjoys his life and does not want it to change.

One day, the class is interrupted by the arrival of another student, Joachim, who has a new baby brother and is not pleased about it, as no one prioritizes him anymore. Joachim was not aware of the arrival, but did observe his father's uncharacteriscally affectionate behavior towards his mother. The next morning, Nicholas sees that his parents are affectionate to each other too, causing him to suspect that they plan to have a baby. He informs his friends about this; their suspicions are further fueled by Joachim's sudden absence from the school.

Returning home, Nicholas overhears half of a conversation his parents are having about inviting Mr. Moucheboume, Nicholas' father's hard-to-please boss, and his wife over for dinner, mistakenly assuming that it is about the new baby's arrival. When his father suggests a weekend escapade to the woods, Nicholas thinks this is a ploy to abandon him for his baby brother. The next few days, Nicholas becomes determined to please his mother in everything, even attending a tea party with her friends, where he spends time with a girl named Marie-Edwige and her girlfriends. Nonetheless, Nicholas' parents still take him to the woods and he refuses to come out, forcing them to push the car back home when they cannot persuade him otherwise and spend the rest of the day arguing.

Nicholas' friends vow to protect him by forming a secret club to propose ideas on how to make his parents proud of him. They try to clean up the house while his parents are away. However, their attempt results in failure, the house becomes a mess and Nicholas gets grounded for the night. Losing all hope, Nicholas decides to run away from home, but he immediately regrets it and returns. Later on, they decide to hire a gangster who can assist them in kidnapping the child. They learn that Blind Jack is on the loose, but Nicholas instead calls someone working in a garage, who charges 500 francs to strip the "body" down.

They eventually manage to make money out of selling a "formula" with superhuman strength, earning 530 francs in the process. Nicholas once again contacts Blind Jack, who requests a car, forcing him and his friends to steal Geoffrey's father's car by tricking Albert, Geoffrey's butler, into stopping by at an ice cream shop to distract him. Just as they arrive, Nicholas and his friends are surprised to see Joachim, who only got chickenpox, with his little brother. After Joachim expresses how good brotherhood really is, Nicholas has second thoughts and ultimately decides not to go through with the scheme. Nicholas returns home, excited to have a brother, but his parents are confused and tell him that they are not expecting a baby. Frustrated, Nicholas tells his parents how they do nothing to make him happy. Nicholas' father tries to cheer him up, and the whole family ends up laughing.

Nicholas later hears that his mother is expecting a baby. However, he is disappointed and angry to learn that she gave birth to a baby girl. When Nicholas' relatives visit and admire his new sister, he vents to them about having desired to have a brother and that he should have asked for a puppy instead. In response, they all laugh at his outburst and he smiles. Nicholas later remembers the teacher's previous assignment and realizes that he wants to make people laugh.

== Cast ==
- Maxime Godart as Little Nicolas
- Valérie Lemercier as Nicolas' mother
- Kad Merad as Nicolas' father
- Sandrine Kiberlain as the school teacher
- François-Xavier Demaison as Mr. Dubon
- Daniel Prévost as M. Moucheboume, Nicolas' father's boss
- Michel Galabru as The Education Minister (1922-†2016)
- Anémone as Mademoiselle Navarin (1950-†2019)
- François Damiens as Blédur
- Serge Riaboukine as Francis Leborgne
- Victor Carles as Clotaire, the worst student in class
- Damien Ferdel as Agnan, the hypocrite and best student in class
- Vincent Claude as Alceste, the glutton
- Charles Vaillant as Geoffroy, the richest student in class
- Benjamin Averty as Eudes, the fighter (1998-†2018)
- Germain Petit Damico as Rufus, the son of a policeman
- Virgile Tirard as Joachim
- Elisa Heusch as Marie-Edwige
- Françoise Bertin as The old lady (1925-†2014)
- Michel Duchaussoy as the headmaster (1938-†2012)

== Production ==
=== Development ===
Producers Olivier Delbosc and Marc Missonnier from Fidelité Productions offered Laurent Tirard the project, who immediately accepted it because he had grown up with the characters from the story. About the story, Tirard said, "It... struck me as obvious. I grew up with Le Petit Nicolas. I read [it] when I was a teenager. This work represents me and speaks to me. I immediately knew what the film would look like." Tirard further added that the character of Nicolas was very personal to René Goscinny, saying, "I knew that the key would be to adapt the both in his work and in his life, so I tried to understand the character of René Goscinny. This was someone who was looking for his place in society, and he had to win through laughter... [Goscinny] realized that laughter could be both a defense [in] a society where you do not feel out-of-place and a way to insert. These are things that I read between the lines of his biographies, and [they] spoke to me. The little boy looking for his place in society has become the axis on which to build the story."

=== Casting ===
On 8 April 2008, it was announced that Valérie Lemercier and Kad Merad had joined the cast of the film as Nicloas's mother and father. Maxime Godart was cast as the main protagonist, Nicolas. On that matter, Tirard said, "Maxime Godart has a very clear vision of the place he wants to be in the company of what he wants to do with his life. With his outgoing personality, I thought he would not be afraid in front of the camera. But it happened the other way around. The first day, when huge crane arm with a camera approached him for a first round crank, he was petrified!" According to Tirard, Maxime had a great desire to play the character, and he really enjoyed it. "He never gave any sign of fatigue or expressed the need to stop," said Tirard. Tirard also cast his own son Virgil Tirard, as Joachim, a classmate and friend of Nicolas's.

=== Filming ===
Filming began on 22 May 2008 in Paris and ended on 11 October 2008. Most of the filming took place at Studio Monev at Sint-Pieters-Leeuw. Scenes were also shot at Laeken, near the old school of boatmen on a vacant lot, and at the corner of la rue Claessens and la rue Dieudonné Lefèvre.

== Music and soundtrack ==
Le Petit Nicolas: Original Motion Picture Soundtrack

Soundtrack album by Klaus Badelt
- Released: September 28, 2009
- Length: 40:23
- Label: EmArcy Records
- Producer: Klaus Badelt

Klaus Badelt film scores chronology
Dragon Hunters (2008)	Le Petit Nicolas: Original Motion Picture Soundtrack (2009)	Solomon Kane (2009)

The score for Le Petit Nicolas was composed by Klaus Badelt and performed by Geert Chatrou, Dirk Brossé, and Loïc Pontieux. It was released on 28 September 2009 by EmArcy Records. Renan Luce's second single "On n’est pas à une bêtise près" ("Was not a mistake near") from his 2009 album Clan miros appears in the end credits of the film, but it is not part of the album. The song was later released by Luce in October 2009. The album received positive response on its release. Movienthusiast gave the album a positive review and awarded it three out of five stars, saying, "[The] music of this film is able to fill a variety of themes, [and] scenes usually pose a ticklish feeling in the audience themselves." In the soundtrack, Badelt uses "intelligent sound", combining bass drums, violin, harmonica, triangle, and even whistle. "Overall," said Movienthusiast, "every scene is filled by a variety of sounds from various instruments, giving them extra charm."

Track listing

No.	Title	Length
1.	"Un drôle de sujet de rédaction (A funny essay topic)"	07:42
2.	"Générique (Generic)"	02:46
3.	"Mord aux prof (Kill the teacher)"	01:14
4.	"La Roulette (Roulette)"	0:58
5.	"Les Filles, c'est pas intéressant (Girls are not interesting)"	01:00
6.	"Papa et Maman se disputent souvent (Mom and Dad often argue)"	01:43
7.	"3 Francs par rose (3 Francs for a rose)"	03:02
8.	"Un Jeu drôlement compliqué (An awfully complicated game)"	01:40
9.	"Une Balade en forêt (A Walk in the forest)"	01:21
10.	"Le Spectacle (The Show)"	01:11
11.	"Je vais avoir un petit frère! (I'm having a little brother!)"	01:09
12.	"Ménage (Cleaning)"	01:19
13.	"Gangster-à-louer (Gangster to rent)"	01:08
14.	"Et en plus, c'est un sale cafard! (And besides, it's a dirty cockroach!)"	01:11
15.	"Potion Magic (Magic Potion)"	03:50
16.	"Rivalités fraternelles (Sibling rivalry)"	02:05
17.	"Rolls Folle (Rolls mad)"	03:58
18.	"Neuf Mois (Nine Months)"	02:04
19.	"On dirait un poivron confit (It looks like a pepper confit)"	01:02
Total length:		40:23

== Release ==
=== Theatrical release ===
The film was theatrically released in France on 30 September 2009 by Wild Bunch Distribution, Central Film, and EOne Films.

=== Home media ===
The film was released on DVD on 3 February 2010 by Wild Side Video. Bonus features included a booklet with a history of Petit Nicolas and commentary featuring the child artists of the film.

== Reception ==
=== Box office ===
In its first week of release, Le Petit Nicolas sold over a million tickets in France. The film was the highest-grossing film in France for the year with a gross of $48,398,428. It grossed $11,088,066 in international territories for a total of $59,486,494.

=== Critical reception ===
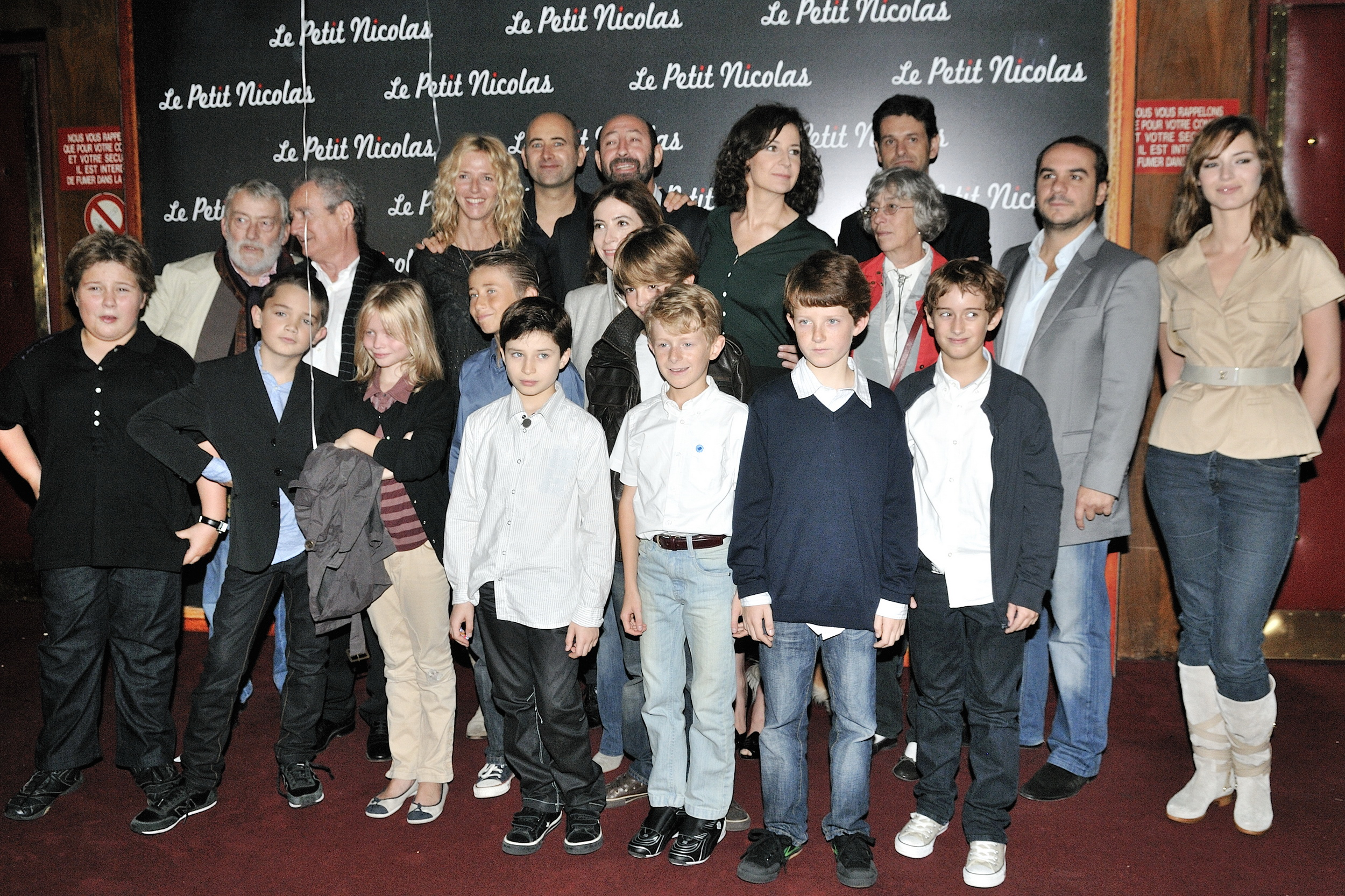
Cast and crew at the premiere of the film at the Le Grand Rex in Paris, September 20, 2009.

On review aggregator website Rotten Tomatoes, the film holds an approval rating of 60% based on 10 reviews. David Parkinson of Empire Online gave the film three out of five stars, saying, "Charmingly capturing the misconceptions of childhood and ebulliently played by a knowing cast, it should delight all ages." Phelim O'Neill of The Guardian gave four stars out of five by saying that "It presents a gently humorous, beautifully shot idyllic version of childhood, all blue skies, good manners and not a hair out of place. It's a nice place to visit for the duration."

Omer Ali of Little White Lies praised the film, saying, "A diverting alternative to more high-octane kiddie fare." Amber Wilkinson of Eye for Film praised the actors, saying, "In a refreshing change from Hollywood films aimed at this market, there is a blissful lack of toilet humor and... plenty of fun to be had for an older audience in watching Nicholas' hapless father (Kad Merad) attempt to win a promotion from his boss by bringing him home to dinner. The acting from the adults has a slight pantomime edge to it, but this complements the source material and gives a real sense of the way in which children tend to view grown-ups as larger-than-life. The children, meanwhile, form a sweet and believable ensemble with Maxime Godart in the central role and Victor Carles as class clot Clotaire. In particular, [they are] likely to crop up in other films."

Similarly, Bernard Besserglik of The Hollywood Reporter also commented, saying that this film adaptation is "technically proficient" and "[features] two of France's best comic actors." However, Jordan Mintzer of Variety criticized the film, saying, "The clan of boys, and especially Nicolas himself, are too impeccably coiffed, dressed, and mannered to resemble the ruffians depicted in Sempe’s drawings or anything like real kids at all. Along with Francoise Dupertuis’ flamboyant sets and tidy lensing by Denis Rouden ("MR 73″), the result is a look of squeaky-clean postwar nostalgia, closer to Christophe Barratier’s The Chorus than to Truffaut’s The 400 Blows, which was set around the same time period."

Robbie Collin of The Daily Telegraph also gave a negative review to the film, saying, "English-speaking children will have to read very quickly indeed to keep up with the subtitles in this meek French family entertainment based on a series of children’s books by René Goscinny, original writer of the Asterix strips."

=== Accolades ===
Year	Award	Category	Recipient	Result
2010	César Awards	Best Adaptation	Laurent Tirard; Gregoire Vigneron	Nominated
2010	European Film Awards	People's Choice Award for Best European Film	Laurent Tirard	Nominated
2010	Cinéfranco	TFO Prize for Best Youth Film	Laurent Tirard	Won
2011	Cinema Brazil Grand Prize	Best Foreign-Language Film	Laurent Tirard	Nominated

== Sequels ==
In August 2013, it was confirmed that the film sequel, Nicholas on Holiday (Les Vacances du Petit Nicolas), would be released on 9 July 2014. Valérie Lemercier and Kad Merad reprised their roles in the sequel, with the character of Nicolas played by newcomer Mathéo Boisselier. A further sequel, Little Nicholas Treasure (Le Trésor du Petit Nicolas), was released in 2021, with Ilan Debrabant in the title role.

== See also ==
- Le petit Nicolas, series of French children's books.
