= The Story of My Life (film) =

2004 film by Laurent Tirard

- Directed by: Laurent Tirard
- Written by: Laurent Tirard; Grégoire Vigneron
- Produced by: Olivier Delbosc; Marc Missonnier
- Starring: Edouard Baer; Marie-Josée Croze; Clovis Cornillac; Alice Taglioni
- Cinematography: Gilles Henry
- Edited by: Valérie Deseine
- Music by: Philippe Rombi
- Distributed by: EuropaCorp Distribution
- Release date: 8 September 2004 (France)
- Running time: 90 minutes
- Country: France
- Language: French
- Budget: $5.6 million
- Box office: $5 million

The Story of My Life (French: Mensonges et trahisons et plus si affinités...) is a 2004 French romantic comedy film directed by Laurent Tirard.

== Cast ==
- Edouard Baer as Raphaël Jullian
  - Raphaël Fuchs as Young Raphaël
- Marie-Josée Croze as Muriel
- Clovis Cornillac as Kevin
- Alice Taglioni as Claire
- Éric Berger as Jeff
- Jean-Michel Lahmi as Max
- Jean Dell as Raphaël's father
- Jean-Christophe Bouvet as Raphaël's editor
- Florence d'Azémar & Judith El Zein as The Yuppie

== Awards ==
- César Award for Best Supporting Actor, 2005 for Clovis Cornillac
