= Deep in the Woods =

- French film poster for Deep in the Woods
- Directed by: Lionel Delplanque
- Written by: Lionel Delplanque; Annabelle Perrichon
- Produced by: Marc Missonnier; Olivier Delbosc
- Starring: Clotilde Courau; Clément Sibony; Vincent Lecoeur; Alexia Stresi; Maud Buquet; François Berléand; Denis Lavant; Michel Muller; Thibault Truffert; Marie Trintignant
- Cinematography: Denis Rouden
- Edited by: Pomme Zhed
- Music by: Jerome Coullet
- Distributed by: Pathé Distribution
- Release date: June 14, 2000 (France)
- Running time: 86 minutes
- Country: France
- Language: French

Deep in the Woods (French: Promenons-nous dans les bois) is a 2000 French slasher film directed by Lionel Delplanque. The film is about a troupe of five young actors who are hired to perform at a remote chateau for Baron Axel De Ferson when they find out that a madman is on the loose murdering people.

The film was released in France on June 14, 2000, and won the award for "Best European Fantasy Film" at the 2000 Sitges Film Festival.

== Plot ==
As a mother reads Little Red Riding Hood to her son, she is killed before his eyes. Later, five young actors including Sophie Jeanne and her four friends are invited to the castle of Axel de Fersen to act in a modernized stage-play of Little Red Riding Hood. They are greeted by the gamekeeper Stephane, Baron Berléand Fernsen, the owner who uses a wheelchair, and his deaf son Nicolas. After dinner, their host retires to bed as the five friends settle in for a night of drinking and dancing but soon find that the Baron has vanished, leaving only a blood stain. The actors return to party which upsets Sophie as she feels their behavior is disrespectful and oblivious to the danger. Sophie wants to leave the strange castle, but the others say that she could too easily get lost in the woods. Her friends are slowly killed one by one: Matilda is stabbed in the shower by a man disguised as a wolf and later Jeanne is killed. The three survivors begin to panic and try to find Stephane who they believe is the killer. When their other friend Wilfried is killed, Sophie accuses Matthew of being the murderer. This upsets Matthew, but the two soon meet up with the wolf: Axel de Fersen. Sophie manages to kill him and flees the castle with both Matthew and Nicolas.

== Release ==
Deep in the Woods was released in France on June 14, 2000. The film was shown at the 2000 Sitges Film Festival in Spain. The film won the award for "Best European Fantasy Film" at the festival.

It was released in France on VHS and DVD in 2001. The film was released on DVD by Artisan Entertainment on October 23, 2001. This DVD contained an audio commentary from Brian Yuzna. A Region 2 DVD was released by Tartan Video on August 26, 2002.

== Reception ==
The French version of the magazine FHM gave the film a rating of four stars out of five, stating that for a debut feature, it was "brilliant". A review in Télérama gave the film two stars out of five, stating suggesting that the film educed unintentional laughter. Allrovi gave the film three stars out of five, comparing Deep in the Woods to the work of Dario Argento. The review went on to suggest that the style was so overwhelming that it covered the film's plot holes. Film4 referred to the film as slick and well crafted but "sadly lacks any convincing tension or threatening atmosphere. A prime example of style over content."

It opened in France with 170,000 admissions in its opening week. It grossed a total of $145,320 on its United States release.
