= The Serpent (2006 film) =

2006 French thriller film

- Theatrical release poster
- Directed by: Éric Barbier
- Written by: Éric Barbier; Ted Lewis (novel); Nam Tran-Minh
- Produced by: Olivier Delbosc; Éric Jehelmann; Marc Missonnier; Pierre Rambaldi
- Starring: Yvan Attal
- Cinematography: Jérôme Robert
- Edited by: Véronique Lange
- Music by: Renaud Barbier
- Distributed by: Wild Bunch Distribution
- Release date: 8 December 2006 (Marrakech International Film Festival)
- Country: France
- Language: French
- Budget: $10.4 million
- Box office: $5.8 million

The Serpent (French title: Le Serpent) is a 2006 French thriller film written and directed by Éric Barbier and based on the 1971 novel Plender by Ted Lewis.

== Plot ==
A father on the verge of divorce sees his life fall apart after a former classmate brings murder, kidnapping and blackmail into his life. His only chance to escape is by entering the former classmate's world.

== Cast ==
- Yvan Attal as Vincent Mandel
- Clovis Cornillac as Joseph Plender
- Minna Haapkylä as Hélène
- Pierre Richard as Cendras
- Simon Abkarian as Sam
- Olga Kurylenko as Sofia
- Veronika Varga as Catherine
- Jean-Claude Bouillon as Max
- Pierre Marzin as Carbona
- Gerald Laroche as Becker
- Abdelhafid Metalsi as Police Officer at the cemetery
- Manon Tournier as Julietter

== See also ==
- List of French films
- Cinema of France
