= Nicholas on Holiday =

- Film poster
- Original title: Les vacances du petit Nicolas
- Directed by: Laurent Tirard
- Written by: Laurent Tirard; Grégoire Vigneron; Jaco Van Dormael
- Based on: Nicholas on Holiday by René Goscinny and Jean-Jacques Sempé
- Produced by: Olivier Delbosc; Marc Missonnier
- Starring: Mathéo Boisselier; Valérie Lemercier; Kad Merad; Dominique Lavanant; François-Xavier Demaison; Bouli Lanners
- Cinematography: Denis Rouden
- Edited by: Valérie Deseine
- Music by: Éric Neveux
- Production companies: Fidélité Films; M6 Films; Saint Sébastien Froissart
- Distributed by: Wild Bunch
- Release date: 9 July 2014
- Running time: 97 minutes
- Country: France
- Language: French
- Budget: €24.5 million
- Box office: $27.6 million

Nicholas on Holiday (aka Nicolas on Holiday (UK), French: Les Vacances du Petit Nicolas) is a 2014 French family comedy film directed by Laurent Tirard, starring Mathéo Boisselier, Valérie Lemercier, Kad Merad, Dominique Lavanant, François-Xavier Demaison and Bouli Lanners. It is the sequel to the 2009 film Little Nicholas. The film was released in France on 9 July 2014. The film is based on René Goscinny's and Jean-Jacques Sempé's books for children about Nicholas and his friends.

== Plot ==
Nicholas spends his summer holidays with his Parents and his Grandmother at the seaside. He quickly makes new friends, including the boy Blaise, who lives in the area, the English pupil Djodjo, the gourmand Fructueux, the righteous Côme, and the crybaby Crépin. But just when Nicholas believes he has got everything under control, Isabelle appears, the daughter of his parents' friends, Mr and Mrs Bernique. He does not understand why she cares so much about him until he becomes suspicious that his parents are trying to set her up as his wife-to-be.

Nicholas consults his friends about the looming threat to his "true love", marrying Marie-Edwige. His friends offer advice and plot to separate Isabelle and Nicholas. They tell him that he must tarnish his family's reputation in front of Isabelle's parents, which happens by circumstance (Granny wanting to go to the casino). Meanwhile, Nicholas' dad is having nightmares of his boss, Mr. Moucheboume, and colleagues laughing at a postcard he sent. He later writes and puts in a mailbox a letter of resignation. However, he later gets a call from Moucheboume, who has big plans for him. This changes Nicolas' dad's mind, and after failing to retrieve the letter from the mailbox, he sets it all on fire.

Nicholas and his friends even contemplate putting vipers on their beds to drive them out of there. After a close encounter with the viper, they connect the water supply and sewage line in the shower so the shower will have sewage coming out of it. Isabelle walks in on Nicholas guarding her door as the boys do the job. He gets frightened and bolts, then Isabelle walks up to him in an enclosed space and gives him Marie-Edwige's bracelet (which Nicholas lost a few days ago). The two then start chatting and get to know each other well. His interest for Isabelle grows. When the boys find out, they are unhappy and disappointed, until Isabelle shows what she can do and becomes their friend. Later, Mrs Bernique's shower incident forces them to almost leave. The boys then sabotage their car to extend their stay.

One day on the beach, Massimo Massini, a very loud and obnoxious movie producer from Italy, is filming a movie on the beach, angering the vacationers. In a fit of anger, Nicholas' mother marches up to Massini and yells at him in public to stop being so inconsiderate to everyone else; this act is well received by the other vacationers. To apologize, Massini sends his assistant to invite Nicolas's parents to a party he is throwing at a club. There, Nicholas' mother dances with Massini and Nicholas' dad is kicked out of the club by security.

Isabelle takes her dad's chequebook from the coat, which forces them to stay even longer. Her father thinks it is Nicholas' dad who stole it (due to Nick's aforementioned lie about the family), though he later finds out this is not the case after patting down his pockets in an awkward manner. Nicholas' mother walks down the beach to have become a sort of local celebrity; she is interviewed and Nicholas' dad is pushed away. Nicholas and Isabelle decide to run away to an old fortress, as the former writes a letter explaining this to Marie-Edwige. At night, there is a masked party, which Nicholas and Isabelle use as a distraction to get to the fortress, which is filled with explosives that they shift aside.

Back at the party, Nicholas' dad finds a letter that his son wrote to him about running away, and Mr Bernique finds a similar one from Isabelle. Côme unintentionally gives away the location of the two, and a search party is sent out to the fortress. Massini takes Nicholas' mother to his car, while Nicholas' dad misses the search party leaving and goes by bike. Then when it crashes, he finds a tractor, with which he crushes Massini's parked car until it gets stuck.

Nicholas and Isabelle decide to go back to the hotel. As they leave, a shelf holding an explosive collapses, triggering an explosion that demolishes the entire fortress. In the forest, a hunter spots Massini in a gorilla suit, mistaking him for a Bigfoot-like creature, and shoots at him, to no avail. The search party finds where the original fortress was, albeit with nothing left. They head back to the hotel to find Nicholas and Isabelle asleep in front of a TV.

The next day, three days before summer vacation ends, everyone leaves the hotel, and Nicholas promises Isabelle he will write to her every day. As he is thinking of her, Marie-Edwige comes up to him, saying she gave him the wrong address to write to. Later, in a mid-credits scene, Marie-Edwige makes Nicholas write a letter to Isabelle saying he should stop writing to her.

== Cast ==
- Mathéo Boisselier as Little Nicholas
- Valérie Lemercier as the mother of Nicholas
- Kad Merad as the father of Nicholas
- Dominique Lavanant as Grandma
- François-Xavier Demaison as Le Bouillon
- Bouli Lanners as Mr Bernique
- Luca Zingaretti as Massimo Massini
- Judith Henry as Mrs Bernique
- Francis Perrin as the director
- Daniel Prévost as Mr Moucheboume
- Bruno Lochet as Mr Leguano
- Fabienne Galula as Mrs Leguano
- Erja Malatier as Isabelle Bernique
- Lionel Abelanski as the architect
- Jean-Michel Lahmi as ice seller
