= Criminal Lovers =

- Film poster
- Directed by: François Ozon
- Written by: François Ozon
- Produced by: Olivier Delbosc; Marc Missonnier
- Cinematography: Pierre Stoeber
- Edited by: Claudine Bouché; Dominique Petrot
- Music by: Philippe Rombi
- Distributed by: Mars Distribution
- Release date: 1999
- Running time: 96 minutes
- Country: France
- Language: French

Criminal Lovers (French title: Les amants criminels) is a 1999 Crime film by French director François Ozon. It is a modern retelling of Hansel and Gretel.

== Plot ==
High school student Alice convinces her boyfriend and lover Luc to murder their classmate Saïd, with whom she was having an affair, and who, she claims, raped her. When they dispose of his body in the woods late one night, the couple get lost on their way back to their car and are taken in by a mysterious old hermit. Matters take a bizarre turn when the stranger locks the young lovers in his cellar with the dead body of Saïd and reveals that he plans to eat them. The stranger harnesses Luc and convinces him to have sex by allowing Luc and Alice to survive. After sharing the stranger's bed with him, Luc escapes from the forest without killing the hermit.

When the couple emerge from the forest, they find the police near their car. The authorities have learnt of their murder of Saïd, and arrest them and the hermit, apparently after Saïd's body is found. Luc gets arrested after getting caught in a bear trap, and Alice tries to run away but is eventually caught and killed by the police. In the final sequence, Luc, in vain, tries to stop the police, who are beating the forester. In despair and anguish, Luc is carried to the city in the police car.

== Cast ==
- Natacha Régnier as Alice
- Salim Kechiouche as Saïd
- Miki Manojlović as mysterious old man
- Jérémie Renier as Luc
- Yasmine Belmadi as Karim
- Bernard Maume as professor
- Jean-Louis Debard as night guard
- Catherine Vierne as jewelry saleswoman
- Marielle Coubaillon as hostess at the supernarket
- Olivier Papot as police officer
- Gil de Murger as GIGN officer
- Agnès Accaria
- Ranzi Adjeri
- Myriam Aubert
- Anne-Laure Borel
- Aurélien Boyer
- Jean-Christophe Bozzo
- Sébastien Brolis
- Laurent Brunéo
- Lionel Cathelin
- Emmanuelle Chazot
- Sylvie Colas
- Fernand Da Silva
- Jerôme Dalle
- Guillaume Deschanel
- Patrice Desolière
- Didier Doignon
- Philippe Drumelle
- Guy Durand
- Aurélie Fournet-Fayard
- Guyslaine Gardès
- Marion Gaumet
- Elisabeth Gayton
- Béatrice Guillemet
- Rabah Hamdaoui
- Julien Jallut
- Aglaë Jonathan
- Ludovic Lamadon
- Aude Lapreste
- Guillaume Latrasse
- François Lauret
- Jakie Laverdure
- Séverinne Le Blanc
- Thierry Lemoine
- Christophe Luiz
- Renaud Mallet
- Julien Martres
- Marie-Claire Mazzini
- Renaud Morano
- Alain Moresco
- Cécile Paccard
- Marie-Pierre Perez
- Marie Petit
- Jonathan Piano
- Frédéric Picot
- Caroline Presset
- Raphaelle Rioi
- Cécile Stratonovitch
- Hosine Talbi
- Arnaud Teissière
- Brigitte, Martihino and Nicolas Albuquerque

== Production ==
Filming took place in Clermont-Ferrand and in the Corrèze department.

== Reception ==
On review aggregator website Rotten Tomatoes, the film has a rating of 67% based on 15 critics, with an average rating of 6.1/10. On Metacritic, the film has a score of 59 out of 100 based on reviews from 13 critics, indicating "mixed or average reviews".

Neil Smith of BBC called the film "unsettling, subversive thriller that combines sadism, cannibalism, and homoeroticism to increasingly delirious effect".

Owen Gleiberman of Entertainment Weekly compared it to Deliverance and the fairy tale Hansel and Gretel.

Elvis Mitchell of The New York Times had criticized the film, writing that "it never develops a life of its own" because of "[its] amalgam of fairy tales, old movies and tabloid stories".

The film has been cited as an example of the New French Extremity cycle.
