= Anthony Zimmer =

- Theatrical release poster
- Directed by: Jérôme Salle
- Written by: Jérôme Salle
- Produced by: Olivier Delbosc; Marc Missonnier; Alain Terzian
- Starring: Sophie Marceau; Yvan Attal; Sami Frey
- Cinematography: Denis Rouden
- Edited by: Richard Marizy
- Music by: Frédéric Talgorn
- Distributed by: StudioCanal (through Mars Distribution)
- Release date: 27 April 2005
- Running time: 90 minutes
- Country: France
- Languages: French; English
- Budget: $11.2 million
- Box office: $6.3 million

Anthony Zimmer is a 2005 French romantic thriller film written and directed by Jérôme Salle and starring Sophie Marceau, Yvan Attal, and Sami Frey. Set mainly in southern France, the film is about a highly intelligent criminal—pursued by international police and the Russian mafia—whose extensive plastic surgery makes him unrecognizable, even to his girlfriend, who enlists the help of an unsuspecting stranger on a train. The film was shot on location in Gare de Lyon in Paris 12, the Hôtel Carlton in Cannes, the Hôtel Negresco in Nice, Ibiza in the Balearic Islands, and on the TGV Paris-Nice train.

Anthony Zimmer was released on 27 April 2005 in France, and was critically well received—described as "better than average" by Variety, "a good, strong story with a final twist well told" by Urban Cinefile, and "an especially well-made Hitchcock-style odyssey" by Shadows on the Wall. The film sold 802,988 seats in France but grossed only $6.3 million at the box-office against a $11.2 million budget.

For his directorial debut, Jérôme Salle received a nomination for the César Award for Best First Feature Film.

== Plot ==
Anthony Zimmer is a genius career criminal wanted by police around the world. He has used ingenious methods to launder money legally, using dummy corporations that file lawsuits against firms outside France. Zimmer is also being pursued by the "White Collar Barons"—a powerful Russian mafia with whom he once did business. Zimmer is an elusive character, however, with no known description of his appearance following his recent plastic surgery. One standout detective named Akerman is getting close to catching the criminal mastermind; he knows that Zimmer will risk everything to reunite with the lover he left behind, Chiara Manzoni, who has not seen him since his plastic surgery.

Anticipating a reunion with Zimmer, Chiara arrives at a restaurant, where she receives a message from her boyfriend, telling her to "pick up" a stranger whose general appearance matches his own in order to mislead his pursuers. Chiara boards a TGV high-speed train and chooses François Taillandier, a bland 38-year-old translator who reads detective novels and whose wife left him over six months ago. Fascinated by this beautiful mysterious woman, François has difficulty concentrating on his yogurt and reading. When they arrive at Cannes, Chiara invites François to stay over with her at the Carlton Hotel. She also gives him a watch that bears Zimmer's name on the back.

The next morning, François wakes up alone and finds himself the target of two hitmen. He frantically escapes and seeks shelter at a nearby police station. There, he befriends Lt. Camel Driss, who provides him with clothes and a room at a nearby hospital. They discover that Chiara checked out of the Carlton Hotel that day. Driss believes François' story after seeing a bullet hole in the hotel room, which is now occupied by members of the White Collar Barons and their leader, Nassaiev. Later that night, Driss is murdered.

When he sees Nassaiev and his goons outside his room, François escapes and unexpectedly reunites with Chiara, who takes him to a secret hideout in Nice. There, she explains that she set him up because he matches Zimmer's build, and she tells him to stay in the hideout for a few days. The next day, however, François leaves the hideout and stalks her outside the Hotel Negresco, hoping to get more answers from her. Soon François is nabbed by the police and interrogated by Akerman, who reveals to him that Chiara is in fact an undercover DGDDI agent. That night, Akerman secretly meets up with Chiara to discuss the rendezvous Zimmer proposed in a classified ad. Akerman tells her that while she will be at the rendezvous point, he will keep an eye on François.

With François in custody, Akerman and his men park their surveillance truck and post their snipers within the vicinity of the rendezvous point: Zimmer's old mansion. Chiara enters the mansion and confronts the White Collar Barons and Nassaiev, who threatens to kill her if Zimmer does not arrive within five minutes. François leaves the truck and rushes into the mansion to save her, but is immediately placed on the ground at gunpoint by Nassaiev's men. After Nassaiev rejects her claims that François is not Zimmer, Chiara gives the signal and the snipers shoot down the Russian mobsters.

As the police remove the Russian bodies from the scene, François reveals to Chiara that he is, in fact, Anthony Zimmer. She tells him to flee, but Zimmer refuses, even though he knows Chiara is an agent. He opens a secret safe and takes out a notebook filled with his banking information, and leaves it by the front door for Akerman—his way of giving up his life of crime for the woman he loves. Knowing what he's given up for her, Chiara decides not to reveal his true identity to the police, and the two drive away together.

== Cast ==
- Sophie Marceau as Chiara Manzoni
- Yvan Attal as François Taillandier/Anthony Zimmer
- Sami Frey as Akerman
- Gilles Lellouche as Müller
- Daniel Olbrychski as Nassaiev
- Samir Guesmi as Lt. Camel Driss
- Dimitri Rataud as Perez
- Nicky Marbot as Douanier 1
- Olivier Chenevat as Douanier 2
- Alban Casterman as Jeune Douanier
- Christophe Odent as Président Commission
- Luc Chavy as Membre Commission
- Richard Delestre as Room Manager Carlton
- Yann de Monterno as Serveur Carlton
- Laurent Klug as Homme Discret
- José Fumanal as Réceptionniste Negresco
- Thierry Humbert as Garçon de café Nice
- Marc Diabira as Contrôleur Bus
- Alain Figlarz as Douanier Taxi
- Yves Penay as Réceptionniste Hotel
- Olivier Brocheriou as Infirmier Scanner
- Frédéric Vaysse as Contrôleur TGV
- Christophe Mahoudeaux as Steward TGV
- Arnaud Duléry as Garçon Train Bleu
- Aurélien Jegou as Jeune Garçon Train Bleu
- Gwenaël Clause as Policier Civil
- Pierre Rousselle as Homme Nassaiev
- Patrick Jacquet as Homme Nassaiev
- Valery Novikau as Homme Nassaiev
- Nicolas Tarev as Homme Nassaiev

== Production ==
=== Filming locations ===
Anthony Zimmer was filmed on location in France in Gare de Lyon in Paris 12, the Hôtel Carlton in Cannes, the Hôtel Negresco at 37 Promenade des Anglais in Nice, and on the TGV Paris-Nice train. Scenes for Anthony Zimmer's villa were shot in the Aigua Blanca area on Ibiza in Balearic Islands, Spain.

== Release ==
Anthony Zimmer was released to theaters on 27 April 2005 in France. It was released later that same year in DVD format.

== Reception ==
=== Box office ===
The film sold 802,988 seats in France but did only $6.3 million at the box-office against a $11.2 million budget.

=== Critical response ===
Anthony Zimmer was critically well received. In her review in Variety magazine, Lisa Nesselson wrote that the "well-staged antics are not of the breathless variety, but a handful of original moments and a satisfying twist make the movie better than average."

In his review on the DVD Talk website, Svet Atanasov called Anthony Zimmer a "modest French production" that "tiptoes somewhere on the verge between being a sugary melodrama and an action-packed nailbiter with plenty of unexpected twists". Atanasov noted that the film "manages to pull quite a few intelligent stunts with an admirable finesse". Atanasov singled out first-time director Jérôme Salle and veteran actress Sophie Marceau for their work on the film:

Just when I thought that aside from the stunning vistas of the French Riviera and sunny beaches of Ibiza there is nothing else in Anthony Zimmer worth seeing director Jerome Salle managed to convince me that he had plenty of tricks in his bag worthy of recognition. All of a sudden the film became intriguingly dark and veered off in a direction that aroused my attention. Sophie Marceau reassured my belief that age has only further enhanced her irrefutable charm.

Andrew L. Urban on the Urban Cinefile website wrote that the performances of Sophie Marceau and Yvan Attal "make this thriller fully engaging and the locations are a great bonus. A good, strong story with a final twist is well told, and the tension never lets up. In their review on the Get the Big Picture website, the Three Abiding Dudes also applauded the performances of Marceau and Attal, noting the chemistry between the two actors is a key reason for the film's success. "We can actually see the attraction between the two principal actors," they write, "It's strong enough to carry the film when these two are on the screen, and when they are by themselves we can understand their motives and reasoning."

In his review for the Shadows on the Wall website, Rich Cline gave the film four out of five stars, calling it "an especially well-made Hitchcock-style odyssey that really keeps us guessing where it's going". Cline singles out first-time director Salle who "keeps things cracking from start to finish, continually subverting our expectations". Cline concludes:

This polished and seductive style keeps the audience on its toes; it's that breathlessly enjoyable film in which we never tire of trying to second-guess the characters, figure out the central mystery or worry about how this ill-matched couple can get together in the end ... There's no real subtext here—no clever examination of identity or attraction or justice. The entire point is to throw us into a "what would I do" predicament involving guns, girls, secrets and surprising solutions. So the fact that Salle makes it so effortlessly engaging is pretty amazing really.

=== Accolades ===
The film received a nomination for the César Award for Best First Feature Film for director Jérôme Salle.

== Remake ==
The film was remade under the title The Tourist, which was directed by Florian Henckel von Donnersmarck and starred Johnny Depp, Angelina Jolie, Paul Bettany, and Timothy Dalton. Filming of the remake began on February 23, 2010, in Paris, and it was released on December 10, 2010. Despite being a box-office success and receiving three nominations (Best Picture, Best Actor, and Best Actress) in the Musical or Comedy picture category at the 68th Golden Globe Awards, The Tourist was met with mostly negative critical reviews.
