= Promise Me This =

2007 film by Emir Kusturica

- Завет; Zavet
- Directed by: Emir Kusturica
- Written by: Emir Kusturica
- Produced by: Olivier Delbosc; Emir Kusturica; Marc Missonnier
- Starring: Uroš Milovanović; Marija Petronijević
- Cinematography: Milorad Glušica
- Edited by: Svetolik Zajc
- Music by: Dragan Janic Belac
- Release dates: 26 May 2007 (Cannes premiere); 21 June 2007 (Moscow premiere)
- Running time: 130 minutes
- Country: Serbia
- Language: Serbian

Promise Me This (Serbian: Завет / Zavet) is a film written and directed by the award-winning Serbian filmmaker Emir Kusturica. The film screened on May 26, 2007 at the 60th annual Cannes Film Festival. The international title of the film is Promise Me This, but the film is known as Zavet (Завет, "the testament") in Serbian.

== Plot ==
Set in Zlatibor District, an old man named Živojin Marković (Aleksandar Berček), living in a remote village prays for his grandson Tsane (Uroš Milovanović) to go to the city (Užice), sell his cow and bring back a wife. In the city he is supposed to meet up with his grandfather's stepbrother, but this man is dead. Instead, he meets this man's two grandsons, two good-natured brothers who are nevertheless small-time criminals and experts in demolition. Tsane soon clicks with these men, and also falls in love with a schoolgirl (Jasna, played by Marija Petronijević), who he wants to marry as part of his testament with his grandfather (the other parts of the testament are to bring back an icon and a souvenir, which he should buy with the money he gets from selling the cow). He gets involved in this girl's family affairs, rescuing both her and her mother from prostitution and gangsters headed by a man called Bajo (Miki Manojlović), and the new group of people return to the small village in time to celebrate Živojin's wedding to his neighbor, despite the gangsters' best efforts to stop the celebration, which results in a double wedding.

== Cast ==
- Uroš Milovanović
- Marija Petronijević
- Miki Manojlović
- Aleksandar Berček
- Ljiljana Blagojević
- Stribor Kusturica
