= Molière (2007 film) =

- Original film poster
- Directed by: Laurent Tirard
- Written by: Laurent Tirard; Grégoire Vigneron
- Produced by: Olivier Delbosc; Marc Missonnier
- Starring: Romain Duris; Laura Morante; Ludivine Sagnier
- Cinematography: Gilles Henry
- Edited by: Valérie Deseine
- Music by: Frédéric Talgorn
- Production companies: Fidélité Productions; France 2 Cinéma; France 3 Cinéma
- Distributed by: Wild Bunch
- Release date: 31 January 2007
- Running time: 120 minutes
- Country: France
- Language: French
- Budget: $13.1 million
- Box office: $10.9 million

Molière is a 2007 period biographical film directed by Laurent Tirard and starring Romain Duris as Molière. It was released in Europe in January 2007 and in the United States in July 2007. It was entered into the 29th Moscow International Film Festival where Fabrice Luchini won the Silver George for Best Actor. The screenplay was co-written by Tirard and Grégoire Vigneron.

== Plot ==
The film begins in 1658, when the French actor and playwright returns to Paris with his theatrical troupe to perform in the theatre that the king's brother has given him. Most of the film is in the form of a flashback to 1645. Following an unsuccessful run as a tragic actor, Molière is released from debtor's prison by Monsieur Jourdain, a wealthy commoner with social pretensions, who agrees to pay the young actor's debts if Molière teaches him to act.

Jourdain, a married man with two daughters, hopes to use this talent to ingratiate himself with Célimène, a recently widowed aristocrat with whom he has become obsessed. He hopes to perform a short play he has written for the occasion. Molière, however, has been presented to the family and staff of Monsieur Jourdain as Tartuffe, a priest who is to serve as tutor for the Jourdains' younger daughter. As the story progresses Molière proceeds to fall in love with Jourdain's neglected wife, Elmire. Sub-plots involve the love life of the Jourdains' older daughter, and the intrigues of the penniless and cynical aristocrat Dorante at the expense of the gullible Jourdain.

The story is mostly fictional and many scenes follow actual scenes and text in Molière's plays including Tartuffe, Le Misanthrope, Le Malade imaginaire and Le Bourgeois gentilhomme, whose principal character is also named Jourdain. It is implied that these "actual" events in his life inspired the plays of his maturity.

== Cast ==
- Romain Duris as Jean-Baptiste Poquelin
- Fabrice Luchini as M. Jourdain
- Laura Morante as Elmire Jourdain
- Edouard Baer as Dorante
- Ludivine Sagnier as Célimène
- Fanny Valette as Henriette Jourdain
- Gonzague Montuel as Valère
- Gilian Petrovski as Thomas, son of Dorante
- Sophie-Charlotte Husson as Madeleine Béjart
- François Civil as Louis Béjart
- Anne Suarez as Catherine de Brie
- Annelise Hesme as Marquise du Parc
- Nicolas Vaude as Monsieur

== Critical reception ==
The film holds a rating of 70% on review aggregator website Rotten Tomatoes, based on 86 reviews, with a rating average of 6.4 out of 10. The site's consensus reads, "Molière is a sophisticated, witty biopic of the great satirist."
