= Four Stars (2006 film) =

- Theatrical release poster
- Directed by: Christian Vincent
- Written by: Christian Vincent; Olivier Dazat
- Produced by: Olivier Delbosc; Marc Missonnier
- Starring: Isabelle Carré; José García
- Cinematography: Hélène Louvart
- Edited by: Yves Deschamps
- Music by: André Manoukian
- Distributed by: Mars Distribution
- Release date: 3 May 2006
- Running time: 1h 46min
- Country: France
- Language: French
- Budget: $9.8 million
- Box office: $7 million

Four Stars (French: Quatre étoiles) is a 2006 French comedy film directed by Christian Vincent.

== Cast ==
- Isabelle Carré - Franssou
- José García - Stéphane
- François Cluzet - René
- Michel Vuillermoz - Marc
- Jean-Paul Bonnaire - Jacky Morestel
- Mar Sodupe - Christina
- Guilaine Londez - Marianne
