= Little Nicholas: Happy as Can Be =

Little Nicholas: Happy As Can Be
- Film poster
- French: Le Petit Nicolas : Qu'est-ce qu'on attend pour être heureux ?
- Directed by: Amandine Fredon; Benjamin Massoubre
- Written by: Michel Fessler; Anne Goscinny; Benjamin Massoubre
- Based on: Le Petit Nicolas by René Goscinny and Jean-Jacques Sempé
- Produced by: Adrian Politowski; Christel Hénon; Aton Soumache
- Starring: Alain Chabat; Laurent Lafitte; Simon Faliu
- Edited by: Benjamin Massoubre
- Music by: Ludovic Bource
- Animation by: Juliette Laurent; Keelan MacLeod; Julien Maret; Sevan Selvadjian
- Production companies: On Classics (Mediawan); Bidibul Productions
- Distributed by: BAC Films
- Release dates: 20 May 2022 (Cannes); 12 October 2022 (France)
- Running time: 82 minutes
- Country: France
- Language: French

Little Nicholas: Happy As Can Be (French: Le Petit Nicolas : Qu'est-ce qu'on attend pour être heureux ?) is a 2022 French animated comedy film directed by Amandine Fredon and Benjamin Massoubre. The film portrays the story of René Goscinny and Jean-Jacques Sempé as they create the influential Le Petit Nicolas series of illustrated children's books, blending both scenes that directly adapt vignettes from the books and scenes that depict the real world creation of the books including Goscinny and Sempé interacting with and talking to Nicholas directly.

The film stars Alain Chabat as Goscinny, Laurent Lafitte as Sempé, and Simon Faliu as Nicholas. Goscinny's daughter, Anne Goscinny, was one of the writers.

The film premiered as a special screening at the 2022 Cannes Film Festival.

== Critical response ==
Allan Hunter of Screen Daily praised the film, calling it a charming animation with "some of the style of Sylvain Chomet", and writing that it "unfolds at a cracking pace, mirroring the boisterous, fizzing energy of a curious young mind. Ludovic Bource's jaunty jolly score propels everything along, finding a musical style for every mood. Jean-Jacques's wide-eyed arrival in Paris plays like a dynamic Gene Kelly song'n'dance number, there is a tango for René's time in Argentina, a brassy exuberance to match the sense of expectation when René arrives in New York for the first time."

Kaveh Jalinous of Under the Radar wrote that "Little Nicholas' animation style, primarily reliant on watercolor, is the perfect visual accompaniment to the film's breezy narrative. The animators' minimalist usage of colors not only makes each shot look as if it was ripped out from the books themselves, but also draws heightened attention to both the forms of compositions and the contrast between filled-in spaces and empty ones. The simple everyday animation, especially paired with the film's narrative, reinforces that Little Nicholas is for everyone."

Peter Debruge of Variety was more mixed, praising the story vignettes but writing that the "real-world" segments lacked dramatic impact.

== Awards ==
Award	Date of ceremony	Category	Recipient(s)	Result	Ref(s)
Annecy International Animation Film Festival	2022	Best Animated Feature Film	Amandine Fredon, Benjamin Massoubre	Won	
European Film Awards	10 December 2022	Best Animated Feature Film	Amandine Fredon, Benjamin Massoubre	Nominated	
Lumière Awards	16 January 2023	Best Animated Film	Amandine Fredon, Benjamin Massoubre	Won	
César Awards	24 February 2023	Best Animated Film	Amandine Fredon, Benjamin Massoubre	Nominated	
Annie Awards	25 February 2023	Best Animated Feature, Independent	Amandine Fredon, Benjamin Massoubre	Nominated	
