= Do Not Disturb (2014 film) =

- Film poster
- Directed by: Patrice Leconte
- Screenplay by: Patrice Leconte; Florian Zeller
- Based on: the play Une heure de tranquillité by Florian Zeller
- Produced by: Olivier Delbosc; Marc Missonnier
- Starring: Christian Clavier; Carole Bouquet; Valérie Bonneton; Rossy de Palma; Stéphane De Groodt; Sébastien Castro
- Cinematography: Jean-Marie Dreujou
- Edited by: Joëlle Hache
- Music by: Éric Neveux
- Production companies: Fidélité Films; TF1 Films Production; CZ Productions
- Distributed by: Wild Bunch Distribution
- Release date: 31 December 2014
- Running time: 79 minutes
- Country: France
- Language: French
- Budget: $11 million
- Box office: $9.4 million

Do Not Disturb (French: Une heure de tranquillité) is a 2014 French comedy film directed by Patrice Leconte. The film was adapted from the stage play Une heure de tranquillité by Florian Zeller, who also wrote the screenplay for the film.

== Cast ==
- Christian Clavier as Michel Leproux
- Carole Bouquet as Nathalie Leproux
- Valérie Bonneton as Elsa
- Rossy de Palma as Maria
- Stéphane De Groodt as Pavel
- Sébastien Castro as Sébastien Leproux
- Christian Charmetant as Pierre
- Arnaud Henriet as Léo
- Jean-Pierre Marielle as Michel's father
- Jean-Paul Comart as The seller
