= Le Petit Nicolas (TV series) =

- Genre: Comedy
- Based on: Le Petit Nicolas by René Goscinny
- Directed by: Arnaud Bouron
- Composer: Alexandre Azaria
- Country of origin: France

Production
- Executive producers: Method Animation; Vincent De Mul
- Producers: Natalie Altmann; Aton Soumache; Alexis Vonarb; Lilian Eche; Tapaas Chakravarti
- Running time: 11 minutes
- Production companies: Method Animation; Luxanimation; M6 Studios; MG-MMetropole Télévision; DQ Entertainment; ZDF German Television Network; ZDF Enterprise GmbH; Walt Disney Animation Televisión; Disney Channel France

Original release
- Network: M6
- Release: September 13, 2009 – 2011

Le Petit Nicolas is a French 3D animated TV series based on the character Le petit Nicolas by René Goscinny and Jean-Jacques Sempé. The series was a success especially in attracting young viewers. Two seasons of this TV series were broadcast.

== Voices in English ==
- Henry Alfird
- Umidjon Gafforov

== Voices in French ==
- Valentin Maupin: Nicolas
- Robin Trouffier: Alceste
- Clara Do Espirito: Louisette
- Sauvane Delanoë: Clotaire
- Céline Ronté: Eudes
- Fily Keita: Geoffroy
- Hervé Rey: Agnan
- Laurence Dourlens: the mother of Nicolas
- Bruno Magne: the father of Nicolas
- Marie-Eugénie Maréchal: the teachers
- Xavier Fagnon: Le Bouillon (Old Spuds)
