= X2000 =

- Film's poster
- Directed by: François Ozon
- Written by: François Ozon
- Produced by: Olivier Delbosc; Marc Missonnier
- Starring: Denise Aron-Schropfer; Bruno Slagmulder; Lucia Sanchez; Flavien Coupeau; Lionel Le Guevellou; Olivier Le Guevellou
- Cinematography: Pierre Stoeber
- Edited by: Dominique Petrot
- Production company: Fidélité Productions
- Release dates: 21 November 1998 (Greece); 21 October 1999 (Sweden)
- Running time: 8 minutes
- Country: France
- Language: French

X2000 is a 1998 short film directed by François Ozon.

== Plot ==
A naked man wakes up in a luxury loft, which is a residential building in an unidentified European city, after a particularly wild New Year's Eve party of the year 2000. He finds a naked woman in his bed, and obviously he does not recognize or remember her. He walks naked through the apartment and discovers a pair of partygoers – two young boys, identical twins, in a sleeping bag, hugging each other. He looks out the window and recognizes a man and woman making love in the apartment across the street, while the woman who was sleeping beside him wakes up and takes a bath. While he looks at what is happening across the street, he falls off the table he was sitting on, and lands on the floor, breaking a glass. This noise wakes up the twins. He goes into the kitchen to throw the pieces of broken glass away, and discovers ants underneath the garbage can. He goes into the bathroom and tells the women in the bath about the plague of ants in the kitchen.

== Cast ==
- Denise Aron-Schropfer as the woman
- Bruno Slagmulder as the man
- Lucia Sanchez as a lover
- Flavien Coupeau as a lover
- Lionel Le Guevellou as a twin
- Olivier Le Guevellou as a twin

== Reception ==
In the year 1999, the film won two awards at International Short Film Festival Oberhausen:

- Interfilm Award (awarded to François Ozon)
- Jury Prize for Best Short Film (awarded to François Ozon)

== See also ==
- A Summer Dress
