= Maxime Godart =

French actor (born 1999)

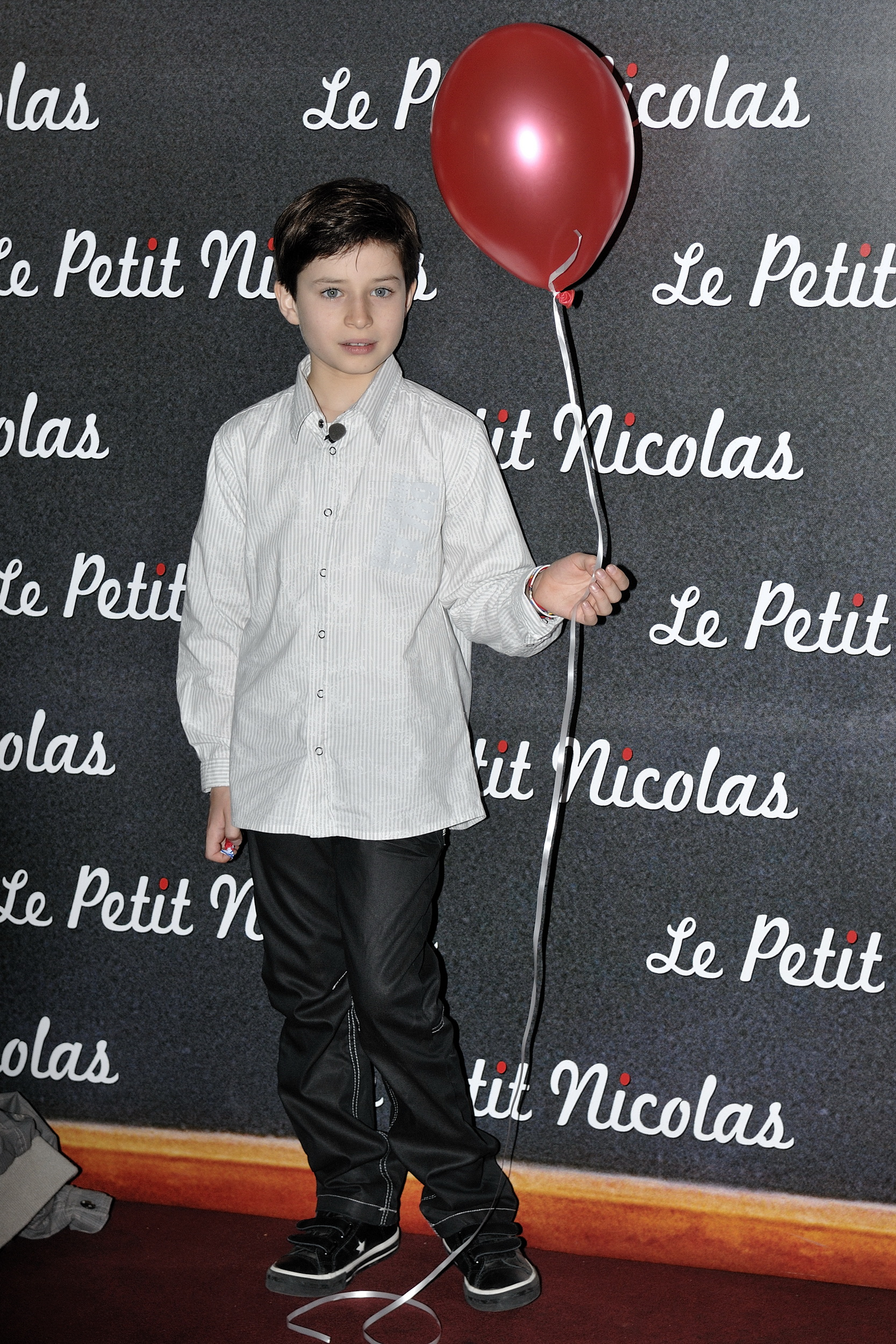
- Godart in 2009
- Born: 2 October 1999 (age 26); Compiègne, France
- Years active: 2009–present

Maxime Godart (born 2 October 1999) is a French actor.

== Filmography ==
=== As actor ===
- 2009: Le Petit Nicolas - Nicolas
- 2009: Les Meilleurs Amis du Monde - Bruce
- 2019: Par un Regard (Short)

=== Television ===
- 2010: Le Grand restaurant - Charles
