= Time to Leave =

2005 film by François Ozon

- Theatrical release poster
- French: Le Temps qui reste
- Directed by: François Ozon
- Written by: François Ozon
- Produced by: Olivier Delbosc; Marc Missonnier
- Starring: Melvil Poupaud; Jeanne Moreau; Valeria Bruni-Tedeschi; Daniel Duval; Marie Rivière; Christian Sengewald; Louise-Anne Hippeau
- Cinematography: Jeanne Lapoirie
- Edited by: Monica Coleman
- Music by: Valentyn Sylvestrov
- Production companies: Fidélité Productions; France 2 Cinéma; FOZ; StudioCanal
- Distributed by: Mars Distribution
- Release dates: 16 May 2005 (Cannes); 30 November 2005 (France)
- Running time: 81 minutes
- Country: France
- Language: French
- Budget: €4.4 million
- Box office: $2.9 million

Time to Leave (French: Le Temps qui reste, lit. 'The Time That Remains') is a 2005 French drama film written and directed by François Ozon. It was screened in the Un Certain Regard section of the 2005 Cannes Film Festival.

== Plot ==
Romain, a gay 31-year-old fashion photographer, discovers he is terminally ill and has only three months to live. He rejects the treatment for his metastasized tumor that might offer him a slim (less than 5%) chance of survival.

Romain exhibits both selfish and reckless behavior. He realizes that his good looks give him a certain amount of leeway and he tests the forbearance of the people who care for him. He chases away his lover Sasha and delights in antagonizing his sister. The only person in whom he confides about his illness is his grandmother Laura.

== Cast ==
- Melvil Poupaud as Romain
- Jeanne Moreau as Laura
- Valeria Bruni Tedeschi as Jany
- Daniel Duval as the father
- Marie Rivière as the mother
- Christian Sengewald as Sasha
- Louise-Anne Hippeau as Sophie

== Awards ==
2005 Valladolid International Film Festival:

- Silver Spike – François Ozon
- Best Actor – Melvil Poupaud

== Critical reception ==
The film received generally positive reviews from critics. On the review aggregator website Rotten Tomatoes, the film holds an approval rating of 75% based on 55 reviews, with an average rating of 6.6/10. The website's critics consensus reads, "A reflective look at our own mortality through the experience of a middle-aged French man, Time To Leave manages to pull at our heart strings without resorting to cliches, and leaves a lasting impression." On Metacritic, the film has an average score of 67 out of 100 based on 21 reviews.

Moira MacDonald of The Seattle Times wrote, "It's a quiet and poignant look at a life as it slips away, seen through the eyes of a character who's not always likable but remains entirely real".
