= The Hook (2004 film) =

- Directed by: Thomas Vincent
- Written by: Maxime Sassier; Thomas Vincent
- Produced by: Olivier Delbosc; Marc Missonnier
- Starring: François Cluzet; Karin Viard
- Cinematography: Dominique Bouilleret
- Edited by: Pauline Dairou
- Music by: Krishna Levy
- Distributed by: Mars Distribution
- Release date: 17 May 2004 (CFF)
- Running time: 107 minutes
- Country: France
- Language: French
- Budget: $5.4 million
- Box office: $696.000

The Hook (French: Je suis un assassin) is a 2004 French thriller film directed by Thomas Vincent, based on the novel of the same name by Donald Westlake.

== Cast ==
- François Cluzet - Ben Castelano
- Karin Viard - Suzy Castelano
- Bernard Giraudeau - Brice Kantor
- Anne Brochet - Lucie Kantor
- Jacques Spiesser - Kouznetov
- Dominique Constanza - The woman in pink
- Antoine Chappey - Captain Stéfanini
- Cécile Richard - Lieutenant Bandera
- Bernard Bloch - The doorman
- Bernard Blancan - The cop
