= Sitcom (film) =

- Film poster
- Directed by: François Ozon
- Written by: François Ozon
- Produced by: Olivier Delbosc; Marc Missonnier
- Starring: Évelyne Dandry, François Marthouret
- Cinematography: Yorick Le Saux
- Edited by: Dominique Petrot
- Music by: Éric Neveux
- Distributed by: Mars Distribution
- Release date: 27 May 1998
- Running time: 85 minutes
- Country: France
- Language: French

Sitcom is a 1998 French surrealistic satire film written and directed by François Ozon. The story documents the moral decline of a once esteemed suburban family, whose descent into degeneracy begins with the purchase of a small white rat.

The film's name is a direct reference to American sitcoms, which are noted for their focus on traditional family values and whimsical humour.

== Plot ==
The patriarch (François Marthouret) of a seemingly normal nuclear family returns home one day with a small white rat. The animal soon has an adverse effect on his wife (Évelyne Dandry) and children, influencing them into enacting their darkest, most hidden desires.

The son, Nicolas (Adrien de Van) loudly announces his homosexuality and begins throwing wild orgies, the daughter Sophie, (Marina de Van) deliberately flirts with death and practices sadomasochism on her boyfriend (Stéphane Rideau), while the mother seduces her son so she can "cure" him of his orientation. After the father eventually kills and devours the offending rat, he turns into one himself; when his family discover this, they band together and brutally slay him.

== Cast ==
- Évelyne Dandry (billed as Evelyne Dandry) as The mother / La mère
- François Marthouret as The father / Le père
- Marina de Van as Sophie
- Adrien de Van as Nicolas
- Stéphane Rideau as David
- Lucia Sanchez as Maria
- Jules-Emmanuel Eyoum Deido as Abdu
- Jean Douchet as Psychotherapist / Le psychothérapeute
- Sébastien Charles as Boy with the zucchinis / Le garçon aux courgettes
- Vincent Vizioz as Guy with red hair / Le garçon aux cheveux rouges
- Kiwani Cojo as Pierced guy / Le garçon au piercing
- Gilles Frilay as Guy with mustache / L'homme moustachu
- Antoine Fischer as Gregory / Le petit garçon

== See also ==
- Queer Cinema
