= Little Nicholas' Treasure =

- Directed by: Julien Rappeneau
- Written by: Julien Rappeneau; Mathias Gavarry; René Goscinny; Jean-Jacques Sempé
- Produced by: Olivier Delbosc
- Starring: Ilan Debrabant; Audrey Lamy; Jean-Paul Rouve
- Cinematography: Vincent Mathias
- Music by: Martin Rappeneau
- Production company: Curiosa Films
- Distributed by: Warner Bros. Pictures
- Release date: 20 October 2021
- Running time: 104 minutes
- Country: France
- Budget: $20,167,665 (approx.)
- Box office: $4,858,613

Little Nicholas' Treasure (known as Le Trésor du Petit Nicolas in French) is a 2021 French family comedy film directed by Julien Rappeneau, starring Ilan Debrabant, Audrey Lamy, and Jean-Paul Rouve. It is the sequel to the 2014 film Nicholas on Holiday. Released in France on October 20, 2021, the film is based on Le Petit Nicolas, the René Goscinny books, illustrated by Jean-Jacques Sempé, for children about Nicholas and his friends.

== Plot ==
Nicholas loves spending time with his mischievous middle-school gang, The Invincibles. When his dad gets a job transfer to the south of France, the gang plans a treasure hunt to prevent the relocation as Nicholas can't bear leaving his friends.

== Cast ==
- Ilan Debrabant as Nicolas
- Audrey Lamy as the mother of Nicolas
- Jean-Paul Rouve as the father of Nicolas
- Pierre Arditi as Monsieur Moucheboume
- Gregory Gadebois as Monsieur Lebon ("Le Bouillon")
- Jean-Pierre Daroussin as the director
- Adeline D'Hermy as the teacher
- Noemie Lvovsky as Mrs. Bouillaguet
- Francois Morel as Mr. Bledurt, the neighbour
- Anton Alluin as Clotaire
- Oscar Boissiere as Celestial
- Leandre Castellano-Lemoine as Agnan
- Malo Chanson-Demange as Rufus
- Simon Faliu as Geoffroy
- Malick Laugier as Eudes
- Leonard Signoret as Maixent
- Philippe Uchan as Grifaton
- Lise Lametrie as Even
- Capucine Sainson-Fabresse as Marie-Edwige
- Catherine Davenier as Mrs. Moucheboume

== Reception ==
The film received mixed reviews from audiences and critics on Rotten Tomatoes.
