= How Much Do You Love Me? =

2005 film by Bertrand Blier

- Theatrical release poster
- French: Combien tu m'aimes ?
- Directed by: Bertrand Blier
- Written by: Bertrand Blier
- Produced by: Olivier Delbosc; Marc Missonnier
- Starring: Monica Bellucci; Bernard Campan; Gérard Depardieu; Jean-Pierre Darroussin
- Cinematography: François Catonné
- Edited by: Marion Monestier
- Production companies: Fidélité Productions; BIM Distribuzione; France 2 Cinéma; Wild Bunch; Pan-Européenne; Plateau A; Les Films Action
- Distributed by: Pan-Européenne (France); BIM Distribuzione (Italy)
- Release dates: 26 October 2005 (France); 3 February 2006 (Italy)
- Running time: 95 minutes
- Countries: France; Italy
- Language: French
- Budget: €10 million ($11.4 million)
- Box office: $6.8 million

How Much Do You Love Me? (French: Combien tu m'aimes ?) is a 2005 romantic comedy film written and directed by Bertrand Blier. It was released on 26 October 2005 in France and Belgium, and had a limited theatrical release in the United States on 18 March 2006. It was entered into the 28th Moscow International Film Festival where Blier won the Silver George for Best Director.

== Plot ==
François, bored with his lonely life in Paris and dull office job, goes to a bar and meets Daniela, a beautiful Italian prostitute. Telling her he has won millions on the lottery, he says he will pay her 100,000 euros a month to live with him until his money runs out. She agrees but André, his friend and doctor, warns them his weak heart will not cope with an energetic sex life. After a meal at a restaurant, Daniela goes down with food poisoning and André, called to attend her, has a stroke and dies at the sight of her voluptuous naked body.

Coming home one day, François finds Daniela gone. At the bar where they met, he learns she has resumed her old trade. He picks up a pretty young prostitute named Muguet, which leads Daniela to confess that she had another man all along, a gangster named Charly who has reclaimed his woman. Since she says she loves François, Charly offers to sell her back to him for four million euros. After long negotiation, François refuses. Unhappy however at life with the coarse Charly, Daniela sneaks back to François' flat, only to find him in bed with his sexy North African neighbour.

Not having seen him for a long time, François' friends from his office turn up and a wild party starts. Daniela, ever a free spirit, disappears for a turn with a handsome man. Charly turns up with a gun, looking for Daniela, and is taken with François' neighbour. François admits that he never won the lottery and couldn't have paid Daniela. The film ends with the two together again.

== Cast ==
- Monica Bellucci as Daniela de Montmartre
- Bernard Campan as François
- Gérard Depardieu as Charly
- Jean-Pierre Darroussin as André Migot
- Sara Forestier as Muguet
- François Rollin as Michael
- Michel Vuillermoz as the doctor
- Édouard Baer as the upset man
- Valérie Karsenti as François's colleague
- Michaël Abiteboul as François's colleague
- Fabienne Chaudat as François's colleague
- Jean Dell as the cemetery man
- Farida Rahouadj as the neighbour
