= 5x2 =

2004 French film by François Ozon

- Theatrical release poster
- Directed by: François Ozon
- Written by: François Ozon; Emmanuèle Bernheim
- Produced by: Olivier Delbosc; Marc Missonnier
- Starring: Valeria Bruni Tedeschi; Stéphane Freiss
- Cinematography: Yorick Le Saux
- Edited by: Monica Coleman
- Music by: Philippe Rombi
- Production companies: Fidélité Productions; France 2 Cinéma; FOZ
- Distributed by: Mars Distribution
- Release date: 1 September 2004
- Running time: 90 minutes
- Country: France
- Language: French
- Budget: $5.3 million
- Box office: $4.1 million

5x2 (also Cinq fois deux; English: Five Times Two) is a 2004 French film directed by François Ozon, which uncovers the back story to the gradual disintegration of a middle class marriage by depicting five key moments in the relationship, but in reverse order.

== Plot ==
A young married couple, Gilles and Marion, are in a lawyer's office. The lawyer reads out the formal terms of their separation. Then, they book a hotel room together. We then go back in time, with the second chapter showing a tense dinner party, at which Gilles appears to admit to infidelity. The third chapter shows their son's birth, which Gilles missed by several hours, leaving Marion in the hospital with only her parents. The fourth chapter shows their wedding day. The final chapter takes place at an Italian beach resort, where their relationship began.

The individual chapters are all punctuated by romantic Italian love songs, which Ozon has said he chose for their "over-the-top sentimentality" and in order to offset the darkness of some of the scenes in the film. Ozon has also said that the backward structure of the story was in part inspired by Jane Campion's 1986 film Two Friends, and that it allowed for "a true, lucid reading of a couple's story".

== Cast ==
- Valeria Bruni Tedeschi as Marion
- Stéphane Freiss as Gilles
- Géraldine Pailhas as Valérie
- Françoise Fabian as Monique
- Michael Lonsdale as Bernard
- Antoine Chappey as Christophe Ferrond
- Marc Ruchmann as Mathieu

== Production ==
Stéphane Freiss said the hotel rape sequence with Valeria Bruni Tedeschi was 'pretty hardcore', explaining that in the screenplay this scene was only a few lines long (it said 'they make love') and revealing that after filming François Ozon said to the actors he wasn't expecting them to give so much.

== Reception ==
The film holds a 65% approval rating on review aggregator Rotten Tomatoes, based on 68 critic reviews. The website's critics consensus reads, "Five scenes from a marriage, deftly and poignantly presented." Metacritic, which uses a weighted average, gave the film a score of 62/100 based on 24 critics, indicating "generally favorable" reviews.

Peter Bradshaw of The Guardian called it "a shrewd, compassionate and quite brilliant essay in the secret theatre of relationships."
