= See the Sea =

1997 French film

- Film poster
- Directed by: François Ozon
- Written by: François Ozon
- Produced by: Nicolas Brevière; Olivier Delbosc
- Starring: Sasha Hails; Marina de Van
- Cinematography: Yorick Le Saux
- Edited by: Jeanne Moutard
- Music by: Éric Neveux
- Distributed by: Lazennec Diffusion
- Release date: 3 December 1997
- Running time: 52 minutes
- Country: France
- Languages: French, English

See the Sea (original title: Regarde la mer) is a 1997 French thriller film written and directed by François Ozon and starring Sasha Hails as a young British mother living in a small seaside village in France who takes in a malevolent homeless drifter (played by Marina de Van) while her husband is away on business.

== Plot ==
An Englishwoman named Sasha lives on France's Île d'Yeu with her husband, who is often away for business, and their infant daughter, Sioffra. One day a young female drifter appears at their door and asks Sasha for permission to pitch her tent in the garden. At first reserved and reluctant, Sasha eventually allows the drifter to camp in the yard. The women begin to develop a relationship with each other.

Sasha decides to go shopping and leaves Sioffra in the care of the drifter, though irritated by the latter's unusual behavior. When she returns to find everything in order, Sasha finally invites the drifter to sleep inside the house. That night, the drifter sneaks into Sasha's room and strips naked while watching her sleep.

Sasha's husband returns home the following day and finds the house empty. In the tent behind the house, he finds Sasha dead and bound, her vagina sewn shut. The drifter, now wearing Sasha's dress, carries the crying Sioffra on a ferry leaving the island.

== Reception ==
See the Sea received positive reviews from critics. Roger Ebert gave the film 3 out of 4 stars and compared it to the films of Alfred Hitchcock.

== Cast ==
- Sasha Hails as Sasha
- Marina de Van as Tatiana
- Samantha as Sioffra, The Baby
- Paul Raoux as Sasha's Husband
