= Le Petit Nicolas =

Children's book series by René Goscinny

- Le petit Nicolas, Denoël, 1960
- Author: René Goscinny
- Illustrator: Jean-Jacques Sempé
- Genre: comic, comedy

Le Petit Nicolas (Little Nicholas) is a series of French children's books created by René Goscinny and illustrated by Jean-Jacques Sempé; its first installment was originally published on 29 March 1959. The books depict an idealized version of childhood in 1950s France.

== History ==
The work started out as a comic strip, which initially ran in the Belgian magazine Le Moustique between 1956 and 1958, drawn by Sempé and written by Goscinny. The series was quick to draw attention. A few years later Goscinny began to write Le Petit Nicolas in short story form, with illustrations by Sempé. The first Nicolas story, L’œuf de Pâques, was published 29 March 1959 in the journal Sud-Ouest Dimanche. The authors hadn't initially planned to continue the series but the sudden popularity of the comic kept them going. Thus, they continued to publish the comics in Sud-Ouest and Pilote until 1965.

Thirty years after Goscinny's death, his daughter Anne decided to publish his unreleased stories, creating new books out of ten stories. Sempé, who was unaware of this material, obliged by providing the illustrations.

The illustrations got turned into a feature film, Little Nicholas: Happy As Can Be from France’s Foliascope and Luxembourg’s Bidibul Productions that released on 16 December 2022. Amandine Fredon and Benjamin Massoubre (I Lost My Body) directed the feature based on the series Le Petit Nicolas.

== Concept ==
The books are told from the point of view of Nicolas himself, which gives the book a distinct and personal sense of humour. The narration is a pastiche of childish storytelling, with run-on sentences and schoolyard slang used in abundance, and much of the humour derives from Nicolas’s misunderstanding of adults' behaviour. At the same time, adults are as much a target of the book's satire as children, as the straightforward and uncomplicated worldview of the child narrator exposes the flaws of adult perception. This subversive element in Le Petit Nicolas made it an early example of modern children's literature that is centred on the experience of the child's interpretation of the world, rather than an adult's.

== Characters ==
The characters from the French edition include (with names from Anthea Bell's English translation in square brackets):

- Nicolas (the main character) [Nicholas]: He is sensitive and attached to true values like friendship, love of one's parents, and has some sense of justice. He is not good at arithmetic and is the smallest in his class.
- Clotaire [Matthew]: "He's bottom of the class."
- Alceste [Alec]: Nicolas' best friend, "he's fat and he eats all the time."
- Eudes [Eddie]: "He's very strong and likes to punch our friends on the nose."
- Geoffroy [Geoffrey]: "His dad is very rich and buys him everything he wants."
- Agnan [Cuthbert]: "He is ranked first in the class and is the teacher's pet and therefore nobody likes him, but you can't hit him as often as you'd like, because he wears glasses."
- Joachim [Jeremy]: He has a little brother.
- Maixent [Max]: He runs very fast because of his long legs.
- Rufus: "His father is a policeman, and he's got a cop's whistle."
- Marie-Edwige Courteplaque [Mary-Jane Campbell]: "She's the nice little girl but sometimes she gets carried away by fashion."
- Louisette [Louise]: The daughter of a friend of the mother of Nicolas; Nicolas decides he wants to marry her because she plays football well.
- Rex: A lost dog that Nicolas found; his real name is Kiki.

Other characters include Nicolas's parents, as well as teachers and administrators in the school. The teacher is hard-working and loves the children, although they usually exasperate her. The superintendent, Mr. Dubon (Mr Goodman), is known as "le Bouillon" ("Old Spuds"). Mr Billings (Mr Blédurt) is their next door neighbour, and likes annoying Nicholas' father.

The two main characters of another comic series by Goscinny, Iznogoud, begin to take shape in the episode when Nicolas is in summer camp. He and the other children are forced to take a nap, so the counsellor tells them a story about "a caliph who was a very good man but who had a very evil vizier...", then tells how the caliph dresses as a common man to find out what people think of him, and the evil vizier takes his place.

== English edition ==
An English edition with the title Young Nicolas was completed by Stella Rodway for Hutchinson & Co. in 1961. It was published in the USA by Bobbs-Merrill in 1962. The characters' names retain the French form. The title page lists the authors simply as "Sempé and Goscinny".

An English edition of the series with anglicised character names was released in 1978, translated by Anthea Bell. This contained five volumes: Nicholas and the Gang at School, Nicholas and the Gang Again, Nicholas on Holiday, Nicholas and the Gang, and Nicholas at Large. The first volume was republished with more complete illustrations in 2005 by Phaidon Press as Nicholas. Four further volumes followed from Phaidon, as Nicholas Again, Nicholas on Holiday (Nicholas on Vacation in North America), Nicholas and the Gang, and finally Nicholas in Trouble in 2008.

In this version, M. Dubon (nicknamed "le Bouillon") becomes Mr. Goodman (nicknamed "Old Spuds"). He derives his nickname from his habit of repeating constantly: "Look me in the eye." In French broth (bouillon) has eyes (blobs of fat on the surface), in the English version they become potato eyes. In the story 'Djodjo', the English exchange student George becomes a Belgian named Jochen, and his nickname is changed from "Djodjo" to "Yocky".

Another English translation of Le petit Nicolas, with the title The Chronicles of Little Nicholas, was published in New York by Farrar, Straus and Giroux in 1993. The translator is not named in this edition; the copyright page attributes copyright for the translation to Farrar, Straus and Giroux.

Nicholas was the subject of a Mildred L. Batchelder Honour for translated children's books in 2006 given by the Association for Library Services to Children (ALSC), a division of the American Library Association, and Nicholas and the Gang received the same honour in 2008

== English books ==
- The Chronicles of Little Nicholas (Le petit Nicolas)
- Young Nicolas (Le petit Nicolas)
- Nicolas (Le petit Nicolas)
- Nicholas Again (Les récrés du petit Nicolas)
- Nicholas on Holiday or Nicholas on Vacation (USA and Canada) (Les vacances du petit Nicolas)
- Nicholas and the Gang (Le petit Nicolas et les copains)
- Nicholas in Trouble (Le petit Nicolas a des ennuis)

== Adaptations ==
- Little Nicholas (Le Petit Nicolas), 2009 film
- Le Petit Nicolas, 2009 animated TV series
- Nicholas on Holiday (Les Vacances du Petit Nicolas), 2014 film
- Little Nicholas' Treasure, 2021 film
- Little Nicholas: Happy As Can Be (Le Petit Nicolas : Qu'est-ce qu'on attend pour être heureux ?), 2022 animated film
