= Podium (film) =

- Directed by: Yann Moix
- Written by: Olivier Dazat (Writer); Yann Moix (Author)
- Produced by: Olivier Delbosc; Marc Missonnier
- Starring: Benoît Poelvoorde; Jean-Paul Rouve; Julie Depardieu
- Cinematography: Philippe Bourgueil
- Edited by: Claudio Cirillo
- Music by: Jean-Claude Petit
- Distributed by: Mars Distribution (France)
- Release date: 17 February 2004 (France)
- Running time: 90 minutes
- Language: French
- Budget: $10 million
- Box office: $24.5 million

Podium is a 2004 French comedy/fantasy film directed by Yann Moix starring Belgian actor Benoît Poelvoorde, Jean-Paul Rouve and Julie Depardieu.

== Plot ==
Bernard Frédéric (Poelvoorde) is a mediocre bank executive, married and with a son. He used to have another profession, that of impersonator of French pop star Claude François. Now, with the "Imitators Gala Night" coming up, he must choose between his wife or the only thing that makes him fully happy: public adoration.

== Cast ==
- Benoît Poelvoorde as Bernard Frédéric
- Jean-Paul Rouve as Couscous
- Julie Depardieu as Véro
- Marie Guillard as Vanessa
- Anne Marivin as Anne
- Nadège Beausson-Diagne as Nadège
- Odile Vuillemin as Odile
- Nicolas Jouxtel as Sébastien
- Olivier Mag as Claude David
- Armelle as Laure
- Evelyne Thomas as herself/Elle-même
- Karine Lyachenko as Jacqueline
- Bruno Abraham-Kremer as Monsieur Lombard
- Dominique Besnehard as Le psychologue

== Awards ==
=== Won ===
- Joseph Plateau Awards, Belgium
  - Best Belgian Actor (Benoît Poelvoorde)

=== Nominated ===
- César Awards, France
  - Best Actor (Benoît Poelvoorde)
  - Best Costume Design (Catherine Bouchard)
  - Best First Work (Yann Moix)
  - Best Supporting Actor (Jean-Paul Rouve)
  - Best Supporting Actress (Julie Depardieu)
