= Laurent Tirard =

French film director and screenwriter (1967–2024)

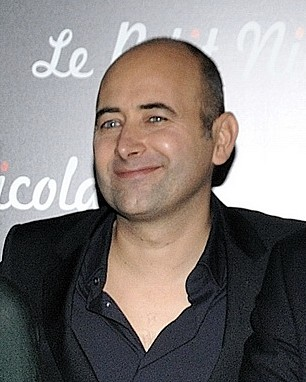
- Tirard in 2009
- Born: 18 February 1967; Roubaix, France
- Died: 5 September 2024 (aged 57); Paris, France
- Education: Sciences Po
- Occupation(s): Director, screenwriter

Laurent Tirard (18 February 1967 – 5 September 2024) was a French film director and screenwriter.

== Life and career ==
Laurent Tirard was born on 18 February 1967 in Roubaix, France. He grew up admiring American films, such as those by Steven Spielberg. Later, he studied filmmaking at New York University, worked as a script reader for Warner Bros. Studios, became a journalist, and worked for the French film magazine Studio for six years.

There, he conducted a series of interviews on filmmaking, published as a book titled Moviemakers' Master Class: Private Lessons from the World's Foremost Directors. From Woody Allen to David Cronenberg, the Coen brothers to Lars Von Trier, all film directors run up against the same essential concerns: how to direct actors, for example, or whether to pre-plan camera angles. In interviewing these and 16 other notable filmmakers, Tirard found notable affinities between seemingly dissimilar directors. The book has also been published in France, Canada, England, Italy, Spain, and Brazil.

In 1997, he left the magazine and began writing scripts for film and television while directing two short films in 1999 and 2000. He wrote and directed his first feature, The Story of My Life, in 2004, co-wrote the hugely successful Prête-moi ta main (How to Get Married and Stay Single) for Alain Chabat in 2006, then wrote and directed his second film, Molière, the following year. Molière was entered into the 29th Moscow International Film Festival.

He directed the film adaptation of the popular French children's book Le petit Nicolas: Little Nicholas in 2009 and its sequel Nicholas on Holiday in 2014.

Tirard died in Paris on 5 September 2024, at the age of 57, after a long battle with cancer.

== Filmography ==
Year	Title	Role	Notes
1999	De source sûre	Writer and director	Short film
2002	Maternal Love	Writer	TV movie
2002	Fred et son orchestre	Writer	TV series
2002	Ton Tour Viendra	Writer	TV series
2004	The Story of My Life	Director and writer	
2004	Mon Vrai Père	Writer	TV movie
2004	Le Plus Beau Jour de Ma Vie	Writer	
2005	Tête de gondole	Director	segments "La Pause", "À consommer froid de préférence"
2006	I Do	Writer	
2007	Molière	Director and writer	
2009	Little Nicholas	Director and writer	
2010	Sans laisser de traces	Writer	
2011	Mike	Writer	
2012	Asterix and Obelix: God Save Britannia	Director and writer	
2014	Nicholas on Holiday	Director and writer	
2016	Up for Love	Director and writer	
2018	Return of the Hero	Director and writer	
2020	The Speech	Director and writer	
2022	Juste ciel !	Director and writer	
