= Moustique =

Belgian weekly news magazine

- Categories: News magazine
- Frequency: Weekly
- Founded: 1924; 102 years ago
- Company: L’Avenir Hebdo
- Country: Belgium
- Based in: Brussels
- Language: French
- Website: www.moustique.be
- ISSN: 2034-6816
- OCLC: 900968294

Moustique (French: The Mosquito) is a weekly news magazine with a special reference to current affairs, culture and television. It has been in circulation since 1924 and is headquartered in Brussels, Belgium.

== History and profile ==
The magazine was started in 1924 with the name Le Moustique and became Télémoustique at the end of the 1960s. It is published on a weekly basis. In March 2011 it was relaunched under the name Moustique. It covers news, cultural events and television-related articles.

Moustique was started by the Dupuis company. The magazine was owned by the Sanoma Magazines. In November 2015 L’Avenir Hebdo, a subsidiary of Nethys, which is a Liège-based media company, acquired the magazine.

In 2013 Moustique sold 70,000 copies.
