= Yann Moix =

French writer and director

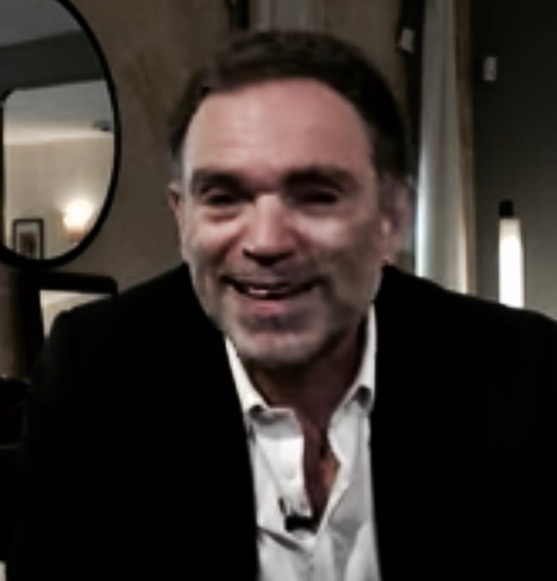
- Moix in 2022
- Born: 31 March 1968 (age 58); Nevers, France
- Education: University of Reims; École supérieure de commerce de Reims; Sciences Po
- Occupations: Writer; Film director Television panelist

Yann Moix (French pronunciation: [jan mwaks], [mwɑks]; born 31 March 1968) is a French author, film director and media commentator. The author of fifteen novels and the recipient of several literary prizes, he has also directed two feature films, including the box-office hit Podium (2004).

Beyond his writing and filmmaking, Moix is a highly visible figure in the French media, including a stint as columnist on the talk show On n'est pas couché. However, his career has been marked by various public controversies that have at times overshadowed his works.

== Early life and education ==
Yann Moix was born on 31 March 1968 in Nevers, France to a French family of Catalan descent. He is a first cousin once removed of Spanish authors Terenci Moix and Ana María Moix. His younger brother, Alexandre Moix, is also an author and filmmaker.

Moix earned a bachelor's degree in Philosophy from the University of Reims Champagne-Ardenne and graduated from the École supérieure de commerce de Reims. He subsequently graduated from Sciences Po.

== Career ==
Moix is the author of several novels. He won the Prix Goncourt for first novel, as well as the Prix François Mauriac from the Académie Française, for Jubilations vers le ciel in 1996. In 2013, he won the Prix Renaudot for Naissance.

In 2004, Moix directed the comedy film Podium, based on one of his novels. The film was a major commercial success in France. On the contrary, his second feature film, Cinéman, flopped in 2009 at the French box office and was panned by most critics. In 2017, Moix directed Re-Calais, a documentary about the migrant crisis in the Calais area.

From 2008 to 2013, Moix wrote a weekly column in the literary supplement of Le Figaro. Between 2015 and 2018, he was a panelist on the talk show On n'est pas couché. From 2018 to 2019 he hosted his own talk show, Chez Moix, on Paris Première. He is a regular contributor to Europe 1's morning show and a panelist on the debate show L'Heure des pros on CNews. A close friend of Bernard-Henri Lévy, Moix is a contributor to La Règle du jeu, a magazine created by Lévy.

Moix's autobiographical novel Orléans, about the abuse he said he had endured as a child, was a commercial success in France in 2019. It was followed by three other autobiographical novels, Reims (2021), Verdun and Paris (both 2022).

== Controversies ==
In 2009, Moix signed a petition in support of film director Roman Polanski, calling for his release after Polanski was arrested in Switzerland in relation to his 1977 charge for drugging and raping a 13-year-old girl.

In 2010, Moix signed a petition against the Gayssot Act created by a friend of his, Holocaust denier Paul-Éric Blanrue, stating that Robert Faurisson and Serge Thion were "serious, intelligent, though delirious revisionists".

In January 2019, Moix's comments about women his own age caused outrage on social media in France. In an interview with the French edition of the women's magazine Marie Claire, Moix commented that women in their 50s were “invisible” to him and that he preferred "younger women's bodies." He added that he preferred dating Asian women, particularly if they are Korean, Chinese or Japanese.

In August 2019, his novel Orléans was published to critical acclaim, but several critics expressed doubt about its content. The book, despite being presented as a novel, was made to look heavily autobiographical, implying that Yann Moix actually endured as a young boy what the protagonist goes through. The book is laced with loathing for the narrator's parents, with Moix positioning himself between the lines as a real-life long-suffering victim who finally dares to tell the truth. Moix's parents disputed those allegations and his younger brother, who is not mentioned in the novel, claimed that some of the severe incidents depicted in the book actually took place between himself and his brother, with Yann Moix as the tormentor.

In the middle of this controversy, the French magazine L'Express revealed on 26 August 2019 that Yann Moix, who has always positioned himself as a staunch defender of the Jewish cause and of ill-treated minorities as a whole, had contributed as a student to a holocaust denying and antisemitic non-professional magazine. At first, Moix admitted having drawn the cartoons it contained, but strongly denied having written any of the text. The following day, L'Express unearthed a document in which the same texts appear, presumably drafts for the magazine, signed by Yann Moix himself, including a short story about a Jew trying to bargain the price of his train ticket to Buchenwald. Moix then admitted that he wrote the texts which he said now make him "want to puke"; he also stated that he was never antisemitic, just filled at the time with self-hatred, claiming that he felt "liberated" now that the story had come out.

Moix, who has expressed a fascination for Korean culture following a relationship with a woman of Korean descent, shot a documentary in 2018 about North Korea, which he visited alongside actor Gérard Depardieu. The idea was to visit the secluded country with a French-speaking, eccentric celebrity: though he initially considered Jean-Claude Van Damme, Moix ultimately selected Depardieu because both the country and the actor celebrated their 70th anniversary that year. Moix claimed his documentary, which he intended to be 2.5 hours long, would be a "masterpiece." Eventually, it remained unreleased following a dispute between Moix and his producer, who was unhappy with the material. The project also caused Moix to become entangled in the controversies surrounding Depardieu and the sexual assault allegations against him. In 2023, behind-the-scenes footage was released on French television, which showed Depardieu making multiple obscene and misogynistic remarks while Moix appeared supportive. Moix maintained that those scenes were intended to be fictionalized, and sued both France 2 and his film's production company, which he accused of stealing the leaked footage. In May 2026, the Court of Paris dismissed his complaint, ruling that he was not the owner of the rushes.

== Works ==
=== Novels ===
- Jubilations vers le ciel. Paris: Grasset. 1996. ISBN 9782246516712. OCLC 35175243.
- Les cimetières sont des champs de fleurs. Paris: Grasset. 1997. ISBN 9782246534716. OCLC 40347901.
- Anissa Corto. Paris: Grasset. 2000. ISBN 9782246606611. OCLC 45099790.
- Podium. Paris: Grasset. 2002. ISBN 9782246628415. OCLC 50643292.
- Partouz. Paris: Grasset. 2004. ISBN 9782246660910. OCLC 56489658.
- Panthéon. Paris: Grasset. 2006. ISBN 9782246661016. OCLC 71274045.
- Mort et vie d'Edith Stein. Paris: Grasset. 2007. ISBN 9782246732617. OCLC 190797030.
- La meute. Paris: Grasset. 2010. ISBN 9782246770510. OCLC 549148313.
- Naissance. Paris: Grasset. 2013. ISBN 9782246713210. OCLC 858316201.
- Une simple lettre d'amour. Paris: Grasset. 2015. ISBN 9782246857693. OCLC 908678167.
- Rompre. Paris: Grasset. 2019. ISBN 9782246863571. OCLC 8854328320.
- Orléans. Paris: Grasset. 2019. ISBN 9782246820512. OCLC 9468726381.
- Reims. Paris: Grasset. 2021. ISBN 9782246823445. OCLC 1251848902.
- Verdun. Paris: Grasset. 2022. ISBN 9782246823469. OCLC 1313483569.
- Paris. Paris: Grasset. 2022. ISBN 9782246823483. OCLC 1342557127.

=== Biography ===
- Cinquante ans dans la peau de Michael Jackson. Paris: Grasset. 2009. ISBN 9782246763413. OCLC 436245116.

=== Poetry collection ===
- Transfusion. Paris: Grasset. 2004. ISBN 9782246660811. OCLC 470175077.

=== Film ===
- Grand oral (2000, short)
- Podium (2004)
- Cinéman (2009)

=== Documentary ===
- Re-Calais (2017)
- 70 (2018, unreleased)
