= Beyond the Walls (TV series) =

French television series

- French: Au-delà des Murs
- Genre: Horror
- Created by: Marc Herpoux, Hervé Hadmar.
- Written by: Sylvie Chanteux, Hervé Hadmar.
- Directed by: Hervé Hadmar.
- Composer: Eric Demarsan
- Countries of origin: France, Belgium.
- No. of episodes: 3

Original release
- Release: 22 September 2016

Beyond the Walls (French: Au-delà des Murs) is a miniseries about a haunted house made for French television in 2016.

== Plot ==
A lonely young woman, Lisa, moves into an apartment opposite an empty house. Soon afterwards, police discover the body of a man which has been sitting in an armchair inside the empty house for 30 years. Although Lisa does not know the dead man, he left her the house in his will. She moves in. At night she hears anguished cries from behind the walls. Investigating further, she becomes trapped in an eerie realm of hallways, rooms, forests and monsters. She meets a young man, Julien, who has been wandering this realm for years, and together they attempt to escape.

== Episodes ==
- Episode 1: Lisa, a speech therapist living a solitary life, unexpectedly inherits an old house across the road from her apartment. She moves in. Intrigued by cries at night from behind the wallpaper, she smashes through brickwork to investigate. Trapped in a haunted maze of rooms, she flees a strange figure with a boar's head and is rescued by Julien. (43:59 long)
- Episode 2: Lisa sees a little girl. Believing it to be her dead sister, Sophie, she tries to follow. Julien says the exit lies behind a red door. (44:15 long)
- Episode 3: Lisa encounters a mysterious old woman named Rose, struggles to save her sister, and then attempts to rescue Julien. (52:21 long)

== Cast ==
- Veerle Baetens - Lisa.
- Geraldine Chaplin - Rose.
- François Deblock - Julien.
- Lila-Rose Gilberti - Sophie.

== Broadcast ==
- Australia: broadcast on SBS Viceland in October 2016, rated PG.
- France and Germany: broadcast on Arte in September 2016.
- United States: streamed on Shudder in October 2016.

Viewed in succession, the episodes are about the length of a feature movie, and so have also been screened at film festivals.

== Reception ==
The A.V. Club described the miniseries as captivating and sophisticated, with gorgeous set design. Starburst gave it 9 out of 10 stars, saying it had incredible cinematography.

American Cinematheque said it was a mesmerizing thriller and an innovative take on the haunted house genre. The Sydney Morning Herald said it had beautiful production design, taut pacing, and was a sophisticated take on the haunted house genre.
