= La Chance de ma vie =

- Directed by: Nicolas Cuche
- Starring: Virginie Efira; François-Xavier Demaison
- Edited by: Valérie Deseine
- Release date: 5 January 2011
- Running time: 87 minutes
- Country: France
- Language: French
- Budget: $8.4 million
- Box office: $13 million

La Chance de ma vie is a 2011 French comedy film directed by Nicolas Cuche.

== Cast ==
- Virginie Efira - Joanna Sorini
- François-Xavier Demaison - Julien Monnier
- Armelle Deutsch - Sophie
- Raphaël Personnaz - Martin Dupont
- Thomas N'Gijol - Vincent
- Brigitte Roüan - Joanna's Mother
- Marie-Christine Adam - Dominique
- Élie Semoun - Philippe Markus
- Francis Perrin - François
- Eric Godon - Doctor Py
- Jean-Louis Sbille - M. Mexès
- Tania Garbarski - Alice

== See also ==
- Stay Away from Me (2013)
