= Gilles Bourdos =

French film director, screenwriter and film producer

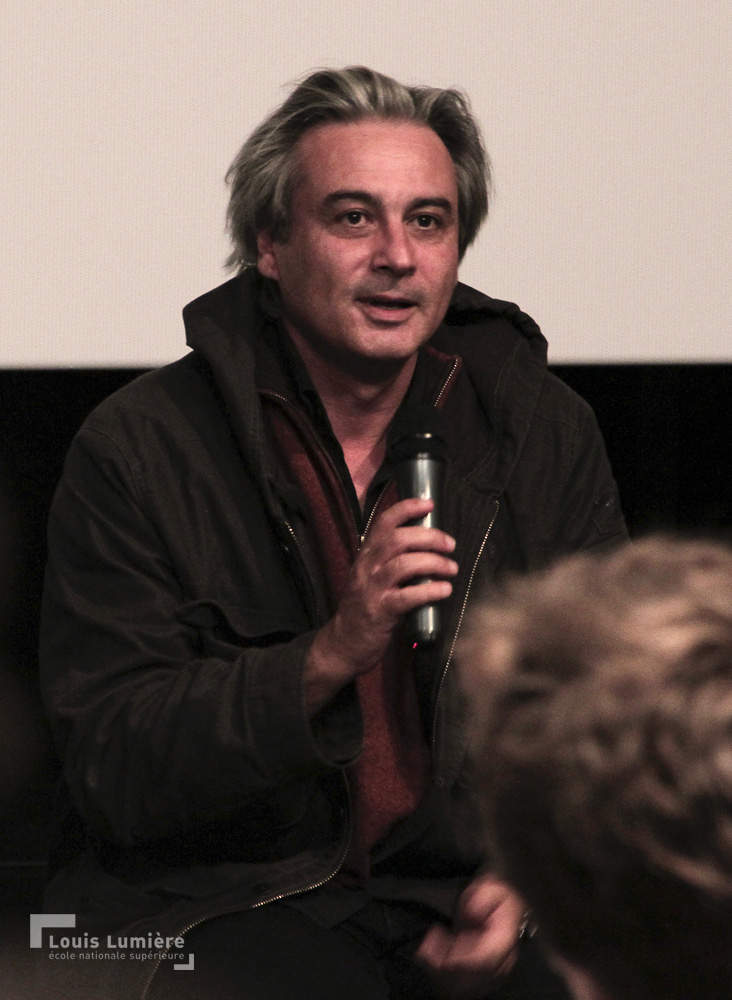
- Bourdos in 2011
- Born: 1963 (age 61–62); Nice, France
- Occupation(s): Director, screenwriter, producer
- Years active: 1989–present

Gilles Bourdos (born 1963) is a French film director, screenwriter and producer. He is best known for his atmospheric cinema, which uses troubling themes in contrast with strong aesthetic imagery. He was one of the founders of the French production company Persona Films which produced most of his early work. Bourdos often collaborates with filmmaker Michel Spinosa, cinematographer Mark Lee Ping Bin and musician Alexandre Desplat.

== Life and career ==
Bourdos, who was born in Nice, France, made his feature film début at the 1998 Cannes Film Festival with Disparus (1998), a political thriller and love triangle during the Surrealist movement in Paris in 1938. His second critically acclaimed feature, Inquietudes (2003), is based on the Ruth Rendell novel A Sight for Sore Eyes and stars Gregoire Colin and Julie Ordon. His first English language film, Afterwards (2008), featured Evangeline Lilly, John Malkovich, and Romain Duris, and was based on the French bestseller Et Après... by Guillaume Musso.

His widely acclaimed 2012 film Renoir competed in the Un Certain Regard section at the 2012 Cannes Film Festival. The film tells the forgotten story of Andree Heuschling, also known as Catherine Hessling, who was the last model of the impressionist painter Pierre-Auguste Renoir and the first actor in the films of his son, the director Jean Renoir. The story is set in the south of France during World War I. The film stars Michel Bouquet, Christa Theret, and Vincent Rottiers. Renoir was selected as the French entry for the Best Foreign Language Film at the 86th Academy Awards, but was not nominated.

== Filmography ==
Year	Title	Credited as			Notes
Year	Title	Director	Screenwriter	Producer	Notes
1986	Un Cadeau de noël	Yes			Short
1988	La Rue ouverte		Yes		Short
1989	L'Eternelle idole	Yes	Yes		Short
1990	La Jeune fille et la mort		Yes		Short
1993	Relache	Yes	Yes		Short
1994	Emmène-moi		Yes	Yes	
1996	Mirek n'est pas parti			Yes	
1997	Un frère			Yes	
1998	Disparus	Yes	Yes	Yes	
2003	Inquiétudes	Yes	Yes		
2008	Afterwards	Yes	Yes		
2012	Renoir	Yes	Yes		Nominated—Cannes Film Festival - Prix Un certain regard Nominated—Lumière Award for Best Film; Nominated—Lumière Award for Best Director
2017	Endangered Species	Yes	Yes		
