= Jean-Jacques Sempé =

French cartoonist (1932–2022)

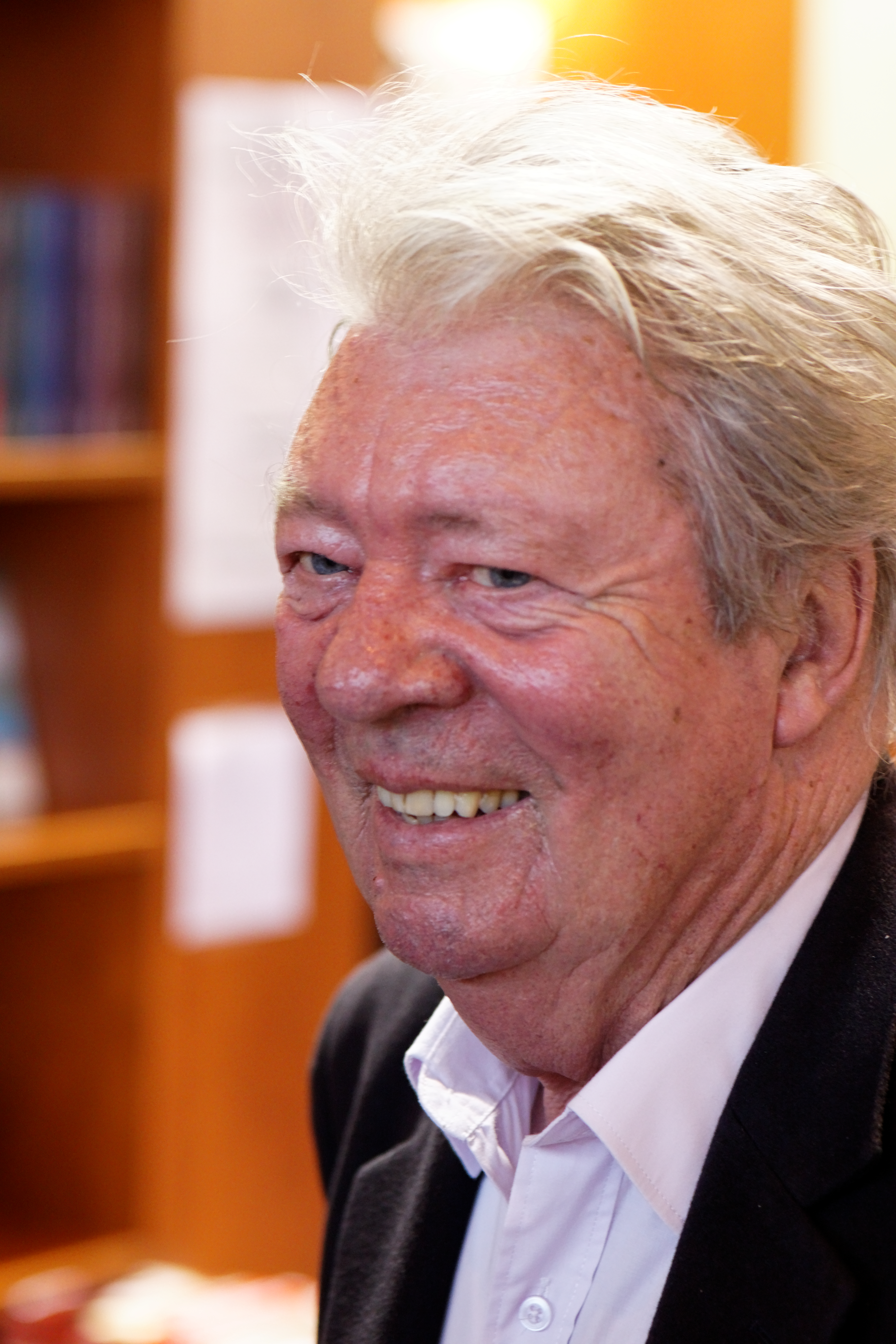
- Sempé in 2011
- Born: 17 August 1932 Pessac, France
- Died: 11 August 2022 (aged 89) Ampus, France
- Area: Cartoonist
- Notable works: Le Petit Nicolas
- Spouses: Christina Courtois (divorced); Mette Ivers (divorced); Martine Gossieaux (m. 2017)
- Children: Inga Sempé

Signature
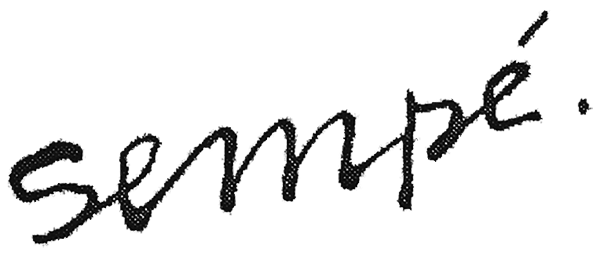

Jean-Jacques Sempé, usually known as Sempé (French: [sɑ̃pe]; 17 August 1932 – 11 August 2022), was a French cartoonist. He is known for the series of children's books he created with René Goscinny, Le Petit Nicolas, and also for his poster-like illustrations, usually drawn from a distant or high viewpoint depicting detailed countrysides or cities. For decades, he created covers for The New Yorker.

== Early life ==
Sempé was born on 17 August 1932 in Pessac, near Bordeaux to a single mother. He was first raised by foster parents, but then his mother took him back in; she lived with his alcoholic stepfather, and the child experienced violence at home. He was expelled from school as a young man, and then failed to pass exams for the post office, a bank and the railways. He then found work selling tooth powder as a door-to-door salesman and also worked delivering wine by bicycle in the Gironde.

After lying about his age, he joined the French Army in 1950, since it was "the only place that would give me a job and a bed", he subsequently explained, and would occasionally get into trouble for drawing while he was supposed to be keeping watch during guard duty. Upon being disciplined for one such occurrence, his real age was discovered and he was subsequently discharged. He then moved to Paris and began working with René Goscinny. Sempé spent most of his life in Paris's Saint-Germain-des-Prés district.

== Artistic career ==
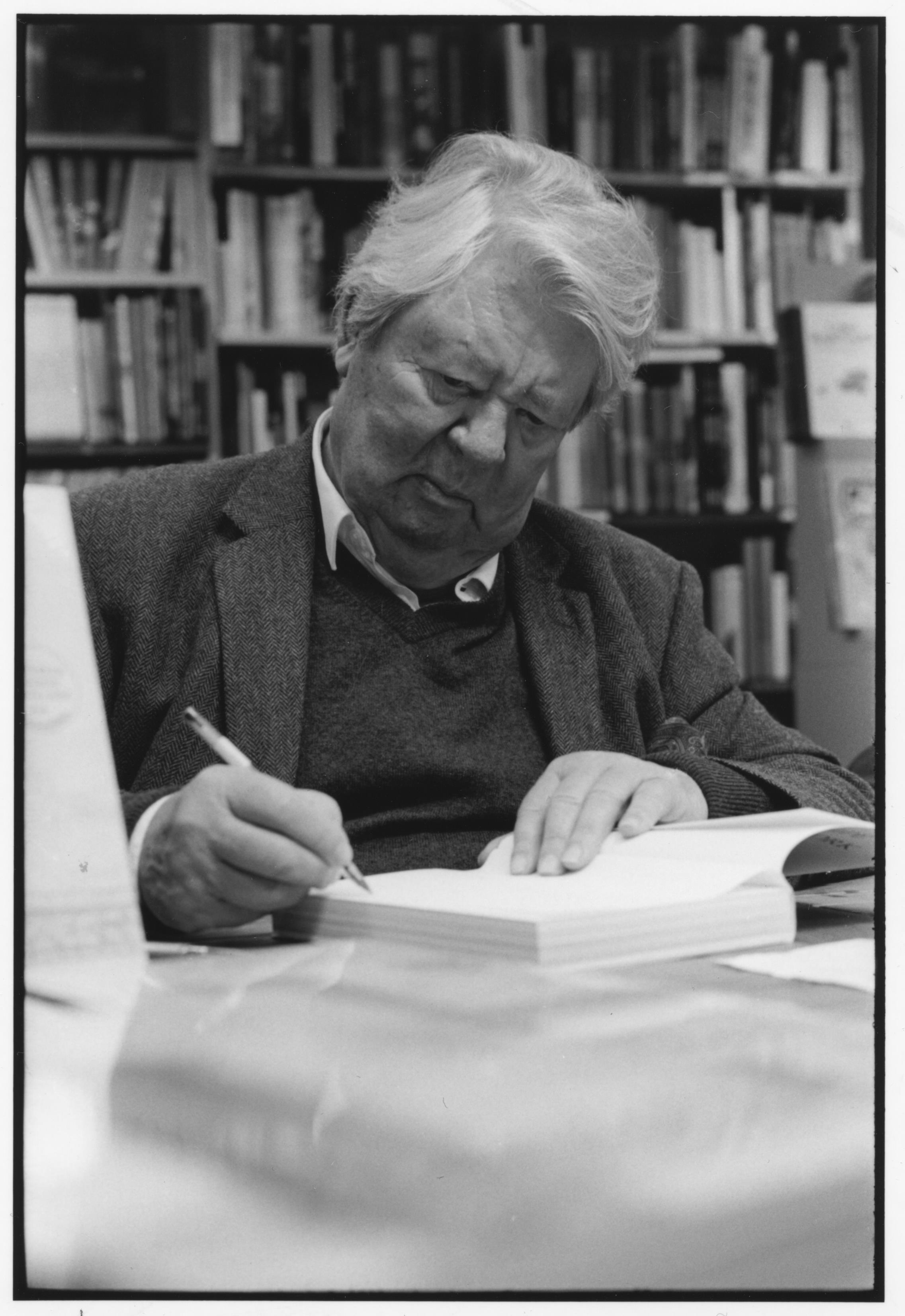
Sempé in 2016 by Olivier Meyer

His career started in France within the context of the Franco-Belgian comics industry. His "mute" watercolours or single image sketches, where the characters speak in pictures or not at all (but somehow manage to convey a rich story) slowly gained international attention. He won his first award in 1952 which is given to encourage young amateur artists to turn professional.

Sempé's full page cartoons appeared in Paris Match for many years. In the 1950s, Sempé became a friend of René Goscinny who would later create Asterix. Together, they invented the character "Little Nicolas" in 1959. Le Petit Nicolas appeared from 1954 in Le Moustique and Sempé drew upon childhood influences and memories to illustrate the comic. In 1960, the comic Le Petit Nicolas was published in Pilote magazine. It was at the time unusual modern children's literature given that it is centred on the experience of the child, rather than an adult interpretation of the world. In general, Sempé rarely drew from life, drawing something every day, putting sketches aside when he got bored with them.

His work has appeared as the cover of The New Yorker magazine from 1978, more than a hundred times. He illustrated Süskind's 1991 novella Die Geschichte von Herrn Sommer. Le Petit Nicolas was translated into 30 languages. A translation of his drawings into English, by Anthea Bell, was published in four volumes in 2006: Nothing is Simple (1962), Everything is Complicated (1963), Sunny Spells (1999) and Mixed Messages (2003). On the occasion of his 80th birthday, the Wilhelm Busch Museum held an exhibition of his work in 2012.

Based on the drawings from Sempé in the series Le Petit Nicholas, the 2022 animated film Little Nicholas: Happy As Can Be is a homage to Sempé and Goscinny.

== Personal life and death ==
Sempé's marriages to fellow artists Christina Courtois and Mette Ivers ended in divorce; he had a daughter from his second marriage. In 2017, he married Martine Gossieaux, his former agent.

Sempé died on 11 August 2022, at age 89. President Emmanuel Macron wrote on Twitter : "Tender irony, the delicatesse of intelligence, the jazz: we will not be able to forget Sempé."

== Bibliography ==
Sempé's works are held by the Bibliothèque nationale de France, including:

=== Collections published Éditions Denoël ===
- Rien n'est simple (1961)
- Tout se complique (1962)
- Sauve qui peut (1964)
- Monsieur Lambert (1965)
- La grande panique (1966) English Panic Stations
- Saint Tropez (1968)
- L'information consommation (1968)
- Marcelin Caillou (1969)
- Des hauts et des bas (1970)
- Face à face (1972)
- Bonjour bonsoir (1974)
- L'ascension sociale de Monsieur Lambert (1975)
- Simple question d'équilibre (1977)
- Un léger décalage (1977)
- Les musiciens (1979)
- Comme par hasard (1981)
- De bon matin (1983)
- Vaguement compétitif (1985)
- Luxe, calme et volupté (1987)
- Par avion (1989)
- Vacances (1990)
- Ames sœurs (1991)
- Insondables mystères (1993)
- Raoul Taburin (une bicyclette à propos de son père) (1995)
- Grands rêves (1997)
- Beau temps (1999)
- Multiples intentions (2003)
- Sentiments distingués (2007)
- Sempé à New York (2009)

=== Filmed portrait ===
- Sempé, rêver pour dessiner (2002) – director Françoise Gallo – International Prize FIFAP UNESCO "Meilleure démarche d'artiste" DVD Digipack (fr)

=== Compilations ===
- En avant −1967 – Pauvert
- Quelques manifestants – 1983 – ISBN 2-207-22943-2
- Quelques enfants – 1983 – ISBN 2-207-22942-4
- Quelques jours de congé – 1984 – ISBN 2-207-23010-4
- Quelques vices impunis – 1986 – ISBN 2-207-23798-2
- Quelques romantiques – 1986 – ISBN 2-207-23288-3
- Quelques représentations – 1987 – ISBN 2-207-23420-7
- Quelques concerts – 1987 – ISBN 2-207-23421-5
- Catherine Certitude (with Patrick Modiano) – 1988 – ISBN 2-07-056423-1
- Quelques artistes et gens de lettres – 1989
- Quelques citadins – 1989 – ISBN 2-207-23579-3
- Quelques sentiments de culpabilité – 1991 – ISBN 2-207-23860-1
- Quelques meneurs d'hommes – 1991 – ISBN 2-207-23087-2
- L'histoire de Monsieur Sommer (with Patrick Süskind) – 1991 – ISBN 2-07-056615-3
- Quelques forces obscures, éditions Denoël, 1994 ISBN 978-2-207-24283-4
- Quelques mystiques – 2000 – ISBN 2-207-24810-0
- Quelques philosophes – 2002 – ISBN 2-207-25373-2
- Le monde Sempé – 2002 – ISBN 2-207-25399-6
- Un peu de Paris – 2001
- Un peu de la France – 5 November (watercolours without text)
