= Laurent Tuel =

French film actor, director and writer (born 1966)

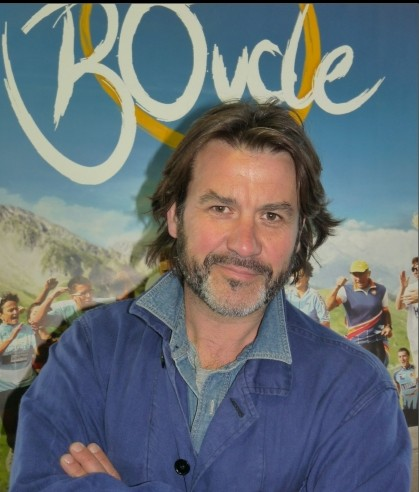
- Laurent Tuel in 2013.
- Born: 1966 (age 59–60)

Laurent Tuel (born 1966) is a French film actor, director and writer.

== Career ==
Laurent Tuel released his first short film Céleste in 1989, when he was 23. In 2007, he was nominated for César Awards for his Jean-Philippe film. He is the author of Le Premier Cercle (2009) film.

== Filmography ==
| Year | Title | Role | Notes |
|---|---|---|---|
| 1990 | Le dénommé (Oublie que tu es un homme) | Trainee decorator | Directed by Jean-Claude Dague |
| 1991 | Céleste | Director & writer | Short |
| 1992 | Le jour de chance du gros Phil | Director & writer | Short |
| 1993 | À la belle étoile | First assistant director | Directed by Antoine Desrosières |
| 1994 | Boulevard Mac Donald | Actor | Short directed by Melvil Poupaud |
| 1995 | Le rocher d'Acapulco | Director, writer & Producer | |
| 1995 | Hillbilly Chainsaw Massacre | Director | Short |
| 1997 | Inca de Oro | Actor | TV movie directed by Patrick Grandperret |
| 1999 | Maurel et Mardy mendient | Actor | Short directed by Antoine Desrosières (2) |
| 2000 | Banqueroute | Actor | Directed by Antoine Desrosières (3) |
| 2001 | Un jeu d'enfants | Director & writer | Nominated - Sitges Film Festival - Best Film |
| 2001 | Le plafond | Actor | Short directed by Mathieu Demy |
| 2006 | Jean-Philippe | Director & writer | Nominated - César Award for Best Original Screenplay |
| 2009 | Le Premier Cercle | Director & writer | |
| 2013 | La grande boucle | Director | |
| 2014 | Fais pas ci, fais pas ça | Director | TV series (1 episode) |
| 2015 | Le combat ordinaire | Director & writer | |
