= Last Bullet (2025 film) =

2025 French action film

- Promotional release poster
- French: Balle perdue 3
- Directed by: Guillaume Pierret
- Written by: Caryl Ferey
- Produced by: Guillaume Pierret; Remi Leautier
- Production companies: Inoxy Films; Versus Production
- Distributed by: Netflix
- Release date: 7 May 2025
- Running time: 111 minutes
- Country: France
- Language: French (Note: With some dialogue in German and Spanish)

Last Bullet (or Lost Bullet 3) (French: Balle perdue 3) is a 2025 French action film directed by Guillaume Pierret. It is third installment in the Lost Bullet film series, sequel to Lost Bullet and Lost Bullet 2. It was released in May 2025.

== Plot ==
Two years after the death of Charas, (Note: As seen in Lost Bullet) Areski begins work at a local timber factory in a small German village under the pseudonym Joris. He lives with Mathilde, a local woman he has been dating.

Areski moonlights as a drug and weapons transporter for a group led by Commander Alexander Resz, the corrupt head of the French Narcotics Department. While on a weapons transport, Areski crashes and realizes that his motorbike has been sabotaged. He manages to escape his pursuers, but his boss from the timber factory breaks in, killing Mathilde and attacking Areski, who escapes. Having realized that Resz has betrayed him to protect himself from an investigation into Charas' death, Areski flees Germany and returns to France to prepare an escape plan.

Meanwhile, Resz orchestrates a deal with the Spanish police to exchange Alvaro, a Spanish drug enforcement officer whom his men kidnapped, for Lino. After the handover, Resz's men massacre the Spanish police team, and Resz threatens Lino before dropping him off. Lino returns to France and meets with his friend Julia. He plans on moving to Spain and living a new life, but changes his mind once he discovers that Areski is also in the country. Areski contacts his estranged wife, Stella, who pleads with him to stay. Shortly after, Areski is attacked by Yuri, one of Resz's henchmen tasked with recovering money that Areski had stolen from their drug operation. Yuri chases Areski into a tram, and Lino intervenes. Areski takes Julia hostage and holds negotiation talks with the police chief Moss, who has been investigating Resz's operation for years. They agree to exchange Julia for incriminating evidence against Resz. Upon learning this, Julia and Lino offer to help Areski reach an airfield so he can return to Germany and testify to local authorities. They are helped by Sarah, a young mechanic and friend of Julia's, to prepare modified vehicles to withstand potential attacks from Resz's men

Moss holds a secret meeting with Resz, where she agrees to hand over Areski in exchange for a high-ranking position. Afterward, Cole advises Resz to order a hit on Yuri, which he does. On the day of the hostage exchange, Areski, Lino, and Julia arrive at the airfield after a pursuit from Resz's men. They encounter Resz, who had eliminated the German police officers tasked with extraditing Areski. Resz exposes Moss's corruption, and he shoots Julia. Yuri, who survived the attack, arrives and kills Resz. A shootout ensues, and Julia instructs Lino to arrest Areski. After a chase that ends with Areski's car crashing, he surrenders to Lino.

Moss signs a contract with Cole that secures her new position, but immediately learns of Resz's death, as well as Julia and Lino still being alive. Areski is brought to the police station, where he watches his family leave once again. Julia confronts Moss and has her arrested. Meanwhile, Yuri kills Cole, who attempted to flee. Lino and Julia thank Sarah, embracing and leaving together.

== Cast ==
- Alban Lenoir as Lino
- Nicolas Duvauchelle as Areski
- Gérard Lanvin as Resz
- Stéfi Celma as Julia
- Pascale Arbillot as Moss
- Anne Serra as Stella
- Diego Martín as Alvaro
- Julie Tedesco as Sarah
- Quentin d'Hainaut as Yuri
- Julie Engelbrecht as Mathilde
- Charles Morillon as Cole
- Lino Lenoir as Thomas

== Production ==
=== Filming ===
Filming took place in southern France, specifically in Montpellier, Sète, Lattes, and Mireval just like the previous prequels. Principal photography began in January 2024 and took place over 68 days before wrapping up by the end of March the same year.

== Release ==
Last Bullet was released on Netflix on 7 May 2025.

== Reception ==
The film received an 80% approval rating on Rotten Tomatoes based on reviews from 10 critics. It was described an "entertaining" and "car-crunching fun" just like the two prequels.
