= Simon Istolainen =

French film producer

Simon Istolainen is a French film producer, known for his work with Alain Goldman.

== Filmography ==
- Les gamins, (2013)
- Robin des bois, la véritable histoire, (2015)
- All Three of Us, (2015)
- Sons of God, (2017)
- The Bar Mitzvah, (2018)
- Bad Seeds, (2018)
- Angel, (2018)
- Sublet, (2020)
- Brutus VS Cesar, (2020)
- Boutchou, (2020)
