= Hao Li =

American computer scientist & university professor

- 黎顥
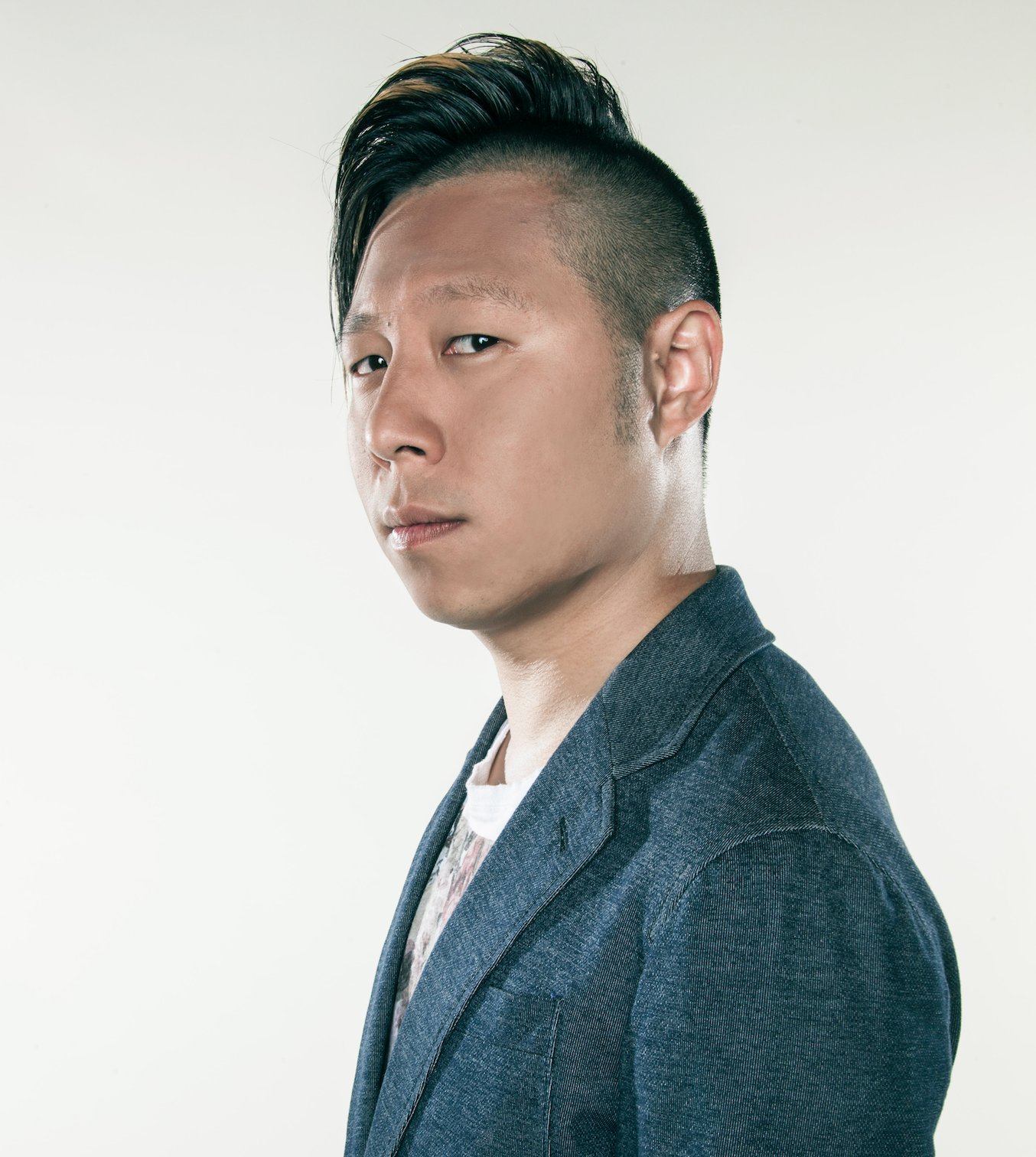
- Born: 17 January 1981 (age 45); Saarbrücken, Saarland, Germany
- Citizenship: German
- Education: ETH Zurich (2010); Karlsruhe Institute of Technology (2006)
- Known for: Human Digitization, Facial Performance Capture
- Awards: TR35 Award; ONR YIP
- Scientific career
- Fields: Computer Graphics, Computer Vision
- Workplaces: Pinscreen (Founder/CEO); Mohamed bin Zayed University of Artificial Intelligence (Dean/Professor)
- Thesis: Animation Reconstruction of Deformable Surfaces (2010)
- Doctoral advisor: Mark Pauly
- Website: www.hao-li.com

Hao Li (Chinese: 黎顥; pinyin: Lí Hào, born January 17, 1981) is a German computer scientist, innovator, visual effects supervisor, academic leader, and entrepreneur, working in the fields of computer graphics, computer vision, and machine learning. He is co-founder and CEO of Pinscreen, Inc, as well as professor of computer vision at the Mohamed Bin Zayed University of Artificial Intelligence (MBZUAI), where he serves as dean of the Undergraduate Division and director of the Metaverse Center. He was previously a Distinguished Fellow at the University of California, Berkeley, an associate professor of computer science at the University of Southern California, and former director of the Vision and Graphics Lab at the USC Institute for Creative Technologies. He was also a visiting professor at Weta Digital and a research lead at Industrial Light & Magic / Lucasfilm.

For his work in non-rigid shape registration, human digitization, and real-time facial performance capture, Li received the TR35 Award in 2013 from the MIT Technology Review. He was named Andrew and Erna Viterbi Early Career Chair in 2015, and was awarded the Google Faculty Research Award and the Okawa Foundation Research Grant the same year. Li won an Office of Naval Research Young Investigator Award in 2018 and was named to the DARPA ISAT Study Group in 2019. He is a member of the Global Future Council on Virtual and Augmented Reality of the World Economic Forum. In 2025, Li was invited to join the Academy of Motion Picture Arts and Sciences.

== Early life ==
Li was born to Taiwanese parents who were living in Germany at the time. He grew up in Saarbrücken, where Li attended a French language school, gaining fluency in German, Mandarin, French, and English. He was inspired to pursue visual arts and computer science after seeing the use of computer-generated imagery in Jurassic Park.

He served in the airborne forces before pursuing his undergraduate studies. His father died when Li was 23 years old.

== Career ==
Li joined Industrial Light & Magic / Lucasfilm in 2012 as a research lead to develop next generation real-time performance capture technologies for virtual production and visual effects. He later joined the computer science department at the University of Southern California as an assistant professor in 2013 and was promoted to associate professor in 2019. In 2014, he spent a summer as a visiting professor at Weta Digital working on facial tracking and hair digitization technologies for the visual effects of Furious 7 and The Hobbit: The Battle of the Five Armies. In 2015, he founded Pinscreen, Inc., an Artificial Intelligence startup that specializes on the creation of photorealistic virtual avatars using advanced machine learning algorithms and later pivoted toward AI-based visual effects, including face replacement, de-aging, facial reenactment, and lip synchronization, for film and television production. In 2016, he was appointed director of the Vision and Graphics Lab at the USC Institute for Creative Technologies and joined the University of California, Berkeley in 2020 as a Distinguished Fellow. In 2022, Li was appointed associate professor of computer vision at the Mohamed Bin Zayed University of Artificial Intelligence in Abu Dhabi, where he directed a new AI center for Metaverse research. In 2024, he was promoted to full professor. In early 2025, he became the founding dean of the Undergraduate Division, where he designed and leads the undergraduate program in artificial intelligence that launched in fall 2025.

== Research ==
He has worked on dynamic geometry processing and data-driven techniques for making 3D human digitization and facial animation. During his PhD, Li co-created a real-time and markerless system for performance-driven facial animation based on depth sensors which won the best paper award at the ACM SIGGRAPH / Eurographics Symposium on Computer Animation in 2009. The team later commercialized a variant of this technology as the facial animation software Faceshift (acquired by Apple Inc. in 2015 and incorporated into the iPhone X in 2017). This technique in deformable shape registration is used by the company C-Rad AB and deployed in hospitals for tracking tumors in real-time during radiation therapy. In 2013, he worked on a home scanning system that uses a Kinect to capture people into game characters or realistic miniature versions. This technology was licensed by Artec and released as a free software Shapify.me. In 2014, he was brought on as visiting professor at Weta Digital to build the high-fidelity facial performance capture pipeline for reenacting the deceased actor Paul Walker in the movie Furious 7 (2015).

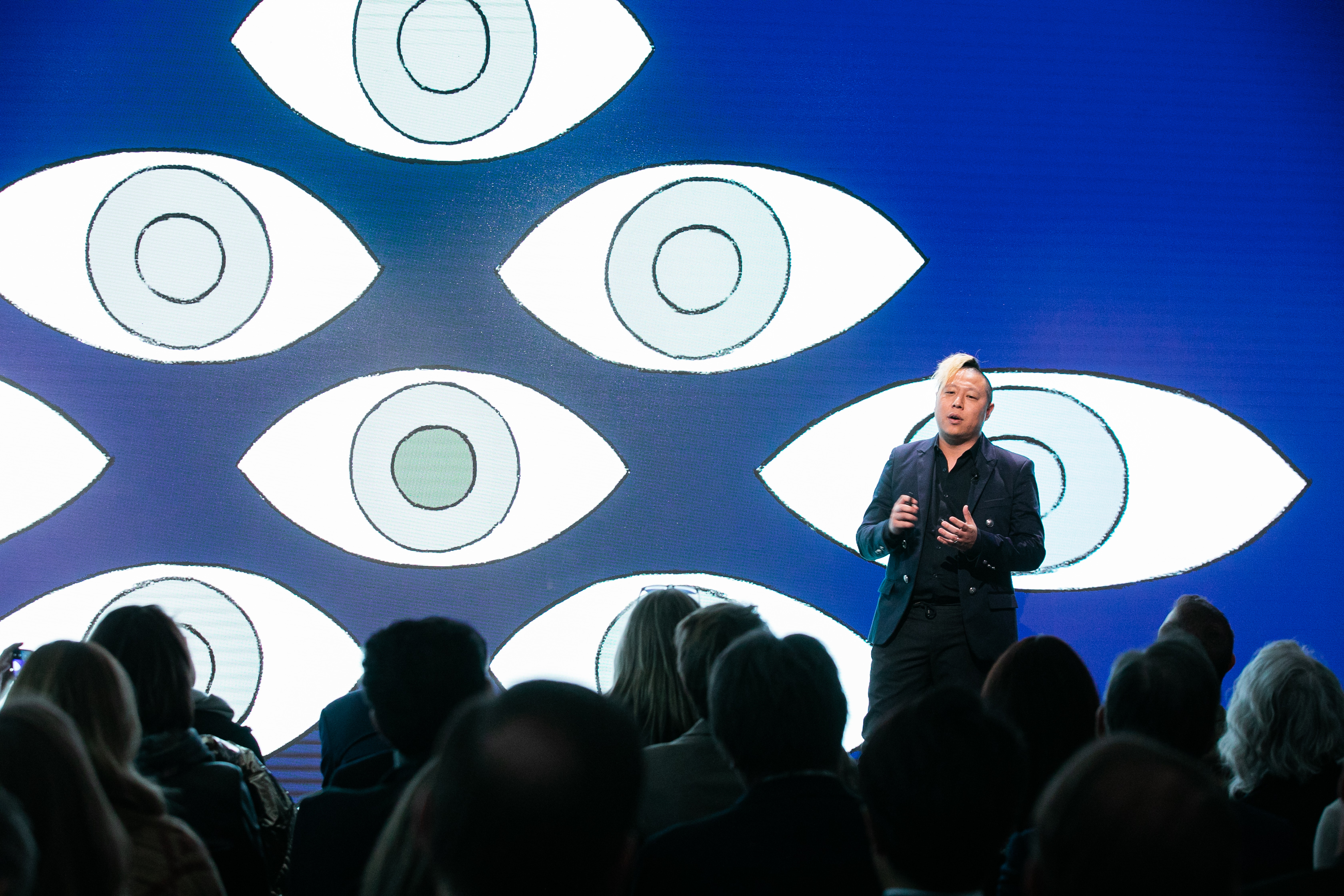
Hao Li speaking at the World Economic Forum 2020

His recent research focuses on combining techniques in Deep Learning and Computer Graphics to facilitate the creation of 3D avatars and to enable true immersive face-to-face communication and telepresence in Virtual Reality. In collaboration with Oculus / Facebook, in 2015 he helped developed a facial performance sensing head-mounted display, which allows users to transfer their facial expressions onto their digital avatars while being immersed in a virtual environment. In the same year, he founded the company Pinscreen, Inc. in Los Angeles, which introduced a technology that can generate realistic 3D avatars of a person including the hair from a single photograph. They also work on deep neural networks that can infer photorealistic faces and expressions, which has been showcased at the Annual Meeting of the New Champions 2019 of the World Economic Forum in Dalian.

Due to the ease of generating and manipulating digital faces, Hao has been raising public awareness about the threat of manipulated videos such as deepfakes. In 2019, Hao and media forensics expert, Hany Farid, from the University of California, Berkeley, released a research paper outlining a new method for spotting deepfakes by analyzing facial expression and movement patterns of a specific person. With the rapid progress in artificial intelligence and computer graphics, Li has predicted that genuine videos and deepfakes will become indistinguishable in as soon as 6 to 12 months, as of September 2019. In January 2020, Li spoke at the World Economic Forum Annual Meeting 2020 in Davos about deepfakes and how they could pose a danger to society. Li and his team at Pinscreen, Inc. also demonstrated a real-time deepfake technology at the annual meeting, where the faces of celebrities are superimposed onto the participants' face.

In 2020, Li and his team developed a volumetric human teleportation system which can digitize an entire human body in 3D from a single webcam and stream the content in real-time. The technology uses 3D deep learning to infer a complete textured model of a person using a single view. The team presented the work at ECCV 2020 and demonstrated the system live at the ACM SIGGRAPH's Real-Time Live! show, where they won the "Best in Show" award.

In 2022, Li led his team at Pinscreen to develop a neural rendering technology for performance-driven lip synchronization in film localization, enabling facial expressions to be adjusted to match English dialogue of the voice actor translated from German and Polish. The technology was used in the feature film The Champion of Auschwitz, representing an early application of generative AI-based facial manipulation in a full-length motion picture, and was subsequently applied in several Netflix productions, including AKA and Berlin. Pinscreen has also applied AI-based visual effects, including facial reenactment and de-aging, in major film and television productions such as Slumberland and Fallout.

== Awards and Honors ==
- Member of the Academy of Motion Picture Arts and Sciences.
- ACM SIGGRAPH 2020 Real-Time Live! "Best in Show" Award.
- DARPA Information Science and Technology (ISAT) Study Group Member.
- Office of Naval Research Young Investigator Award.
- Andrew and Erna Viterbi Early Career Chair.
- Okawa Foundation Research Grant.
- Google Faculty Research Award.
- World's top 35 innovator under 35 by MIT Technology Review.
- Best Paper Award at the ACM SIGGRAPH / Eurographics Symposium on Computer Animation 2009.

== Media ==
For his work in visual effects and AI technology development for film production, Hao has been credited in a number of film, television, and immersive projects. While at Industrial Light & Magic, he was credited on Noah (2014). While employed at Weta Digital, he was credited on Furious 7 (2015) and The Hobbit: The Battle of the Five Armies (2014). During his affiliation with the USC Institute for Creative Technologies, he was credited on Blade Runner 2049 (2017), Valerian and the City of a Thousand Planets (2017), and Free Guy (2021). Through his company Pinscreen, he has been credited on several productions that incorporated AI-assisted visual effects for advanced digital facial manipulation, including Slumberland (2022), the television series Manifest (2023), AKA (2023), Berlin (2024), Fallout (2024–2025), and the immersive experience The Wizard of Oz at Sphere (2025), which was developed in collaboration with Magnopus and Google DeepMind.

He has also appeared as himself in documentaries addressing artificial intelligence and synthetic media, including BuzzFeed’s Follow This (2018), CBC's The Fifth Estate (2018), iHuman (2019), and, in 2022, in an episode of the documentary series Amazon re:MARS Luminaries featuring Pinscreen.
