= Lila Says (novel) =

1996 novel by Chimo

- First edition
- Author: Chimo (a pseudonym)
- Original title: Lila dit ça
- Language: English
- Genre: Novel
- Publisher: Plon (France); Scribner (US)
- Publication date: 1996
- Publication place: France
- English publication date: 1999
- Media type: Print (Hardback)
- Pages: 128 pp
- ISBN: 0-684-83603-3
- OCLC: 38580267
- Dewey Decimal: 843/.914 21
- LC Class: PQ2663.H527 L5513 1999

Lila Says (French title: Lila dit ça) was first published in 1996 in French and translated in Greek in 1997 and in English in 1999. The author's name is only listed as a pseudonym, Chimo. It was adapted into a film.

== Plot summary ==
Lila Says is a narrative of the protagonist's — Chimo, an Arab boy living in France — interactions with a girl named Lila. Lila is 16 and lives with her catholic aunt; Chimo is 19 and lives with his mother, who works as a cleaner, and sister. Both live in an low income housing estate of tower blocks called Oak Tree estate.

Lila is very beautiful and does – according to Chimo – not really fit in, because she is special in all regards. He is, like anyone else who knows her, fascinated and attracted by her. She teases him with her body and her sexuality and her intimate and provocative stories. He did not have much perspective in life, but she has what it takes to change his attitude and she gives him perspective.

He likes writing but has to hide for doing that as he would be ridiculed if others would find out. Lila inspires him and he focusses on writing about her, her life and their encounters. He tells the story of how he makes intimate experiences with her - such as on a slide and on a bike - and about his life at the bottom of society. The process of writing the novel is part of its story and he describes his thoughts whilst writing it.

== Notes ==
The author's real name is not revealed. The publisher's note in the book states that a manuscript was dropped off by a lawyer and they never had a chance to interact with the author. This led to some assumptions they had to make in the text that was published.

Kate Moss named her daughter Lila Grace, simply because she likes both names. She though of "Lila" because she owned this book.

== Book information ==
Lila Says (English edition) by Chimo.

- Hardcover - ISBN 0-684-83603-3 published by Scribner
