= A Crime =

- Theatrical release poster
- Directed by: Manuel Pradal
- Written by: Tonino Benacquista; Manuel Pradal
- Produced by: Laurent Pétin; Michèle Pétin
- Starring: Emmanuelle Béart
- Cinematography: Giorgos Arvanitis
- Edited by: Jennifer Augé
- Music by: Ennio Morricone; Theodore Shapiro
- Distributed by: ARP Sélection
- Release date: September 2006 (Deauville Film Festival)
- Running time: 100 minutes
- Countries: France; United States
- Language: English

A Crime (French title: Un crime) is a 2006 thriller film directed by Manuel Pradal, written by Pradal and Tonino Benacquista, and starring Emmanuelle Béart.

The film unfolds the story of Vincent (Norman Reedus) who looks for his wife's killer. In the process, his neighbor Alice (Emmanuelle Béart) decides to invent a culprit, so that he can find revenge. However, there is no ideal culprit and crime.

== Synopsis ==
In the evening, while returning to his home, Vincent Harris (Reedus) passes a taxi coming from his house. When he arrives, he finds his wife Ashley has been brutally murdered. Three years later, Vincent moves to New York, and his neighbor, Alice Parker (Béart), is frantically in love with him, but Vincent's obsession with discovering his wife's killer, leaves him oblivious to her interest. To make Vincent free to open his heart to her, Alice is willing to find the man responsible for his wife's death. When Alice hails a cab driven by lonely New Yorker Roger Culkin (Keitel), her elaborate plan is slowly set into motion in spite of the ignorance of both men.

== Cast ==
- Emmanuelle Béart as Alice Parker
- Norman Reedus as Vincent Harris
- Harvey Keitel as Roger Culkin
- Joe Grifasi as Bill
- Lily Rabe as Sophie
- Kim Director as Ashley Harris
- Chuck Cooper as Will
- Ted Koch as Scott
- Ben Wang as Chinese Man
- Stephen Payne as Mark
- Brian Tarantina as Joe
- Patrick Collins as Ben
- Clem Cheung as Li Huang
- Jonathan Lam as "Baby-Face"
- Natalie Caron as Jenny
