= Max Boublil =

French actor, singer and comedian

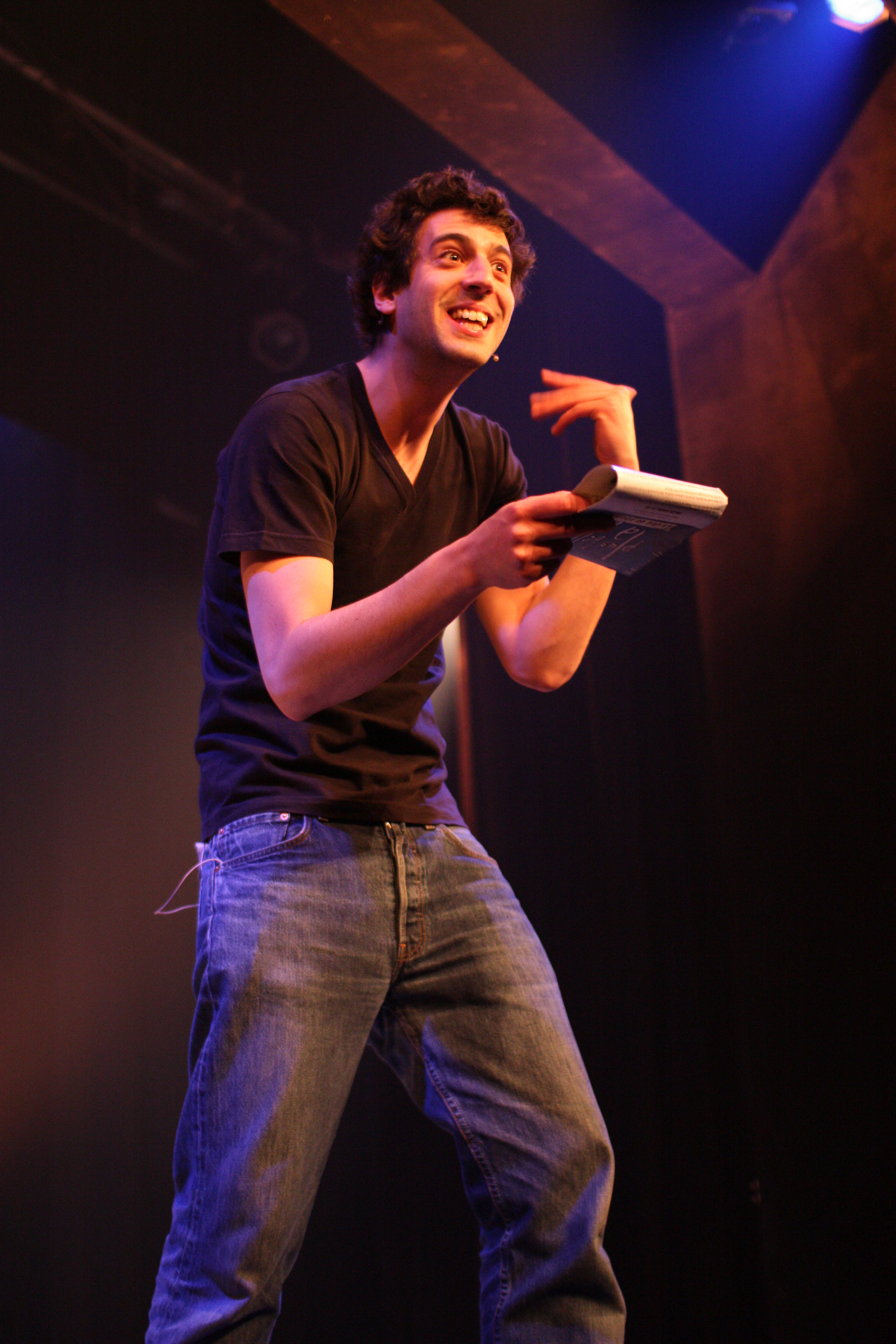
- Born: Maximilien Léon Boublil; 17 May 1979 (age 47); Paris, France

Comedy career
- Years active: 1999–present (acting); 2007–present (singing)
- Medium: Comedian; Actor; Singer
- Genre: pop
- Website: maxboublil.com

Max Boublil (born Maximilien Léon Boublil; 17 May 1979) is a French actor of Sephardi Jewish descent, singer and comedian. He has released 2 albums.

Boublil started his career as a comedian in a number of films (Le Bon Fils, Les Gaous, Doo Wop, T.I.C.), in television films and series such as (Sous le Soleil, Navarro, Quai N°1, Hé M'sieur!, Mystère) and a number of advertisements (Crunch, Yoplait, Direct Assurance).

In May 2007, he released the provocative and humorous song "Ce soir... tu vas prendre" online and gained big fame and was invited to appear on "Dating" spot on Le Grand Journal on Canal +. He left in October 2007, to concentrate on his one-man shows between 2007 and 2009 including a long French tour Max prend.... and in the provinces under the title Max prend la route starting January 2008.

He also took part in TV shows such as One Man Sauvage and did comedy in Max les veut toutes, a F2H production broadcast on Comédie! and NRJ 12 and in May and June 2010, in the television reality show Dilemme on W9 where he presented Le Mag de Max. In September 2010, he came with his new show Le one man musical that included songs and sketches.

For his music career, he has released two albums, the debut L'album released on 14 February 2011 and the follow-up Le 2ème album in June 2012. He is also well known for his humoristic takes on certain songs and personalities such as in "Ce soir tu vas prendre", "Susan Boyle", "Chanson raciste", "J'aime les moches" and others.

Max Boublil co-written and appeared in the film Les Gamins with Alain Chabat, which was released in April 2013.

== Filmography ==
Film

- 2003: Les Gaous directed by Igor Sékulic
- 2004: Les Amateurs directed by Martin Valente
- 2009: La Folle Histoire d'amour de Simon Eskenazy as David in film directed by Jean-Jacques Zilbermann
- 2011: Happy Feet 2 as Sven Puissant in film directed by George Miller
- 2012: La Vérité si je mens! 3 directed by Thomas Gilou
- 2012: Hold Back directed by Rachid Djaidani
- 2013: Les gamins directed by Anthony Marciano
- 2014: Prêt À tout directed by Nicolas Cuche
- 2015: Robin des bois, la véritable histoire directed by Anthony Marciano
- 2015: Le nouveau directed by Rudi Rosenberg
- 2018: Comme des garçons directed by Julien Hallard
- 2018: Ma reum directed by Frédéric Quiring
- 2020: Selfie
- 2020: J'irai mourir dans les Carpates directed by Antoine de Maximy
- 2020: Adorables directed by Solange Cicurel

Television

- 1999: Sous le soleil as Aldo
- 2000: Navarro as Frank (episode 3 in season 12)
- 2001: Le Bon Fils by Irène Jouannet as Manuel
- 2002: Capitaine Lawrence as Marco
- 2002: La Bataille d'Hernani by Jean-Daniel Verhaeghe
- 2004: Quai n°1 as Stan
- 2006: Mademoiselle Joubert as Floréal
- 2006: Hé M'sieur! – Des yeux pour entendre by Patrick Volson as Matéo Goupil
- 2007: Mystère as Tom
- 2011: Le Grand Restaurant II by Gérard Pullicino

== Discography ==
Albums

Year	Single	Charts	Certification	Notes
Year	Single	FR	Certification	Notes
2011	L'album	58		
2012	Le 2ème album	40		

Charting singles

Year	Single	Charts	Certification	Album
Year	Single	FR	Certification	Album
2007	"Ce soir... tu vas prendre"	35		Non-album release
2011	"J'aime les moches"	92		L'album
2011	"T'es bonne"	179		Le 2ème album

Other songs (non-charting)

- 2008: "Une larme qui coule"
- 2010: "Montrez les nous"
- 2010: "Susan Boyle"
- 2010: "Chatroulette" (feat. Sophie Favier)
- 2010: "L'inconnue du Boulevard Bessières"
- 2010: "Depuis que tu n'es plus là"
- 2010: "Chanson raciste"
- 2010: "Clash gentil" (feat. Alibi Montana)
- 2010: "Joyeux Noël"
- 2011: "Mon coloc'" (feat. Alban Lenoir)
- 2011: "Moyen Moyenne" (feat. Luce)
- 2011: "Bois!"
- 2011: "En couple"
- 2011: "Boom Boom Boom"
- 2012: "Exhibitiodance"
- 2012: "T'es bonne..."
- 2012: "J'entends rien!"
- 2012: "Prête-moi ta meuf"
- 2012: "Put your sex in the air" (feat. Kévin Razy)
- 2012: "Addict"

Songs on soundtracks

- 2011: "J'kiffe ton tugudu" (soundtrack of Titeuf 3D)
- 2011: "Tous des mythos" (soundtrack of Les Mythos)
