= Two Brothers (2004 film) =

2004 French-British film by Jean-Jacques Annaud

- United States theatrical release poster
- Directed by: Jean-Jacques Annaud
- Written by: Jean-Jacques Annaud; Alain Godard
- Story by: Jean-Jacques Annaud
- Produced by: Jean-Jacques Annaud; Jake Eberts
- Starring: Guy Pearce; Jean-Claude Dreyfus; Philippine Leroy-Beaulieu; Freddie Highmore; Oanh Nguyen
- Cinematography: Jean-Marie Dreujou
- Edited by: Noëlle Boisson
- Music by: Stephen Warbeck
- Production company: Pathé Pictures
- Distributed by: Pathé
- Release dates: 7 April 2004 (France); 25 June 2004 (United States); 23 July 2004 (United Kingdom)
- Running time: 105 minutes
- Countries: France; United Kingdom
- Languages: English; Khmer; French; Spanish
- Budget: €57.8 million
- Box office: $62.2 million

Two Brothers is a 2004 adventure drama film directed by Jean-Jacques Annaud. Starring Guy Pearce and Freddie Highmore, it tells the story about two Indochinese tiger brothers named Kumal and Sangha, who are separated from their parents as cubs and then reunited a year later as adults to find their way back home. It was distributed by Pathé in Europe.

== Plot ==
Set in 1920s French colonial Cambodia, the story follows two Indochinese tiger brothers, Sangha and Kumal, born to a protective tigress and a male tiger killed by adventurer Aidan McRory. Separated as cubs, their paths diverge: Kumal is captured by villagers, sold to a cruel circus run by Zerbino and Saladin, and trained through abuse to perform dangerous stunts. Sangha, meanwhile, is briefly adopted by Raoul, the 8-year-old son of French administrator Eugene Normandin, but is later sent to a palace menagerie after a conflict with the family’s dog.

McRory, a morally ambiguous hunter, becomes entangled in their fates. After failing to appease a vain Khmer prince with a counterfeit tiger skin (from the circus’s elderly tiger Caesar), he later discovers Sangha’s identity as the prince’s captive "ferocious" tiger. When the prince organizes a staged battle between Sangha and Kumal, the brothers initially clash but recognize each other mid-fight, reverting to playful cubhood antics. Chaos ensues as their trainers provoke them, leading to a violent escape.

The reunited tigers flee into the wilderness, causing mischief in nearby villages. McRory and Raoul track them, but Raoul persuades Sangha to return to the jungle to avoid human threats. Kumal, recalling McRory’s past kindness, spares him before both tigers retreat to their ancestral temple. There, they reunite with their mother, identifiable by a gunshot wound in her ear from McRory’s earlier hunt. The trio finds peace in the wild, symbolizing resilience against colonial exploitation and captivity.

== Cast ==
- Kumal as himself
- Sangha as himself
- Guy Pearce as Aidan McRory
- Freddie Highmore as Raoul Normandin
- Jean-Claude Dreyfus as Administrator Eugene Normandin
- Oanh Nguyen as His Excellency
- Vincent Scarito as Zerbino
- Moussa Maaskri as Saladin
- Maï Anh Le as Naï-Rea
- Philippine Leroy-Beaulieu as Mrs. Mathilda Normandin
- Jaran 'See Tao' Petcharoen as The Village Chief
- Stéphanie Lagarde as Miss Paulette
- Bernard Flavien as His Excellency's Majordomo
- Annop Varapanya as Sergent Van Tranh
- David Gant as the Auctioneer
- Teerawat Mulvilai as Verlaine
- Somjin Chimwong as Napoleon
- Nozha Khouadra as Mrs. Zerbino
- Sakhorn Pring as Dignitary with Goldfish
- Jerry Hoh as the Policeman
- Juliet Howland as Auction Room Stylish Woman
- Caroline Wildi as Auction Room Companion
- Thavirap Tantiwongse as Photographer
- Bô Gaultier de Kermoal as Circus Boy
- Delphine Kassem as Fleeing Bathing Woman
- Alan Fairbairn as Assistant to Auctioneer
- Thomas Larget as Residency Butler
- Hy Peahu as Dignitaries' Translator
- Luong Ham Chao as Dignitary
- Tran Hong as Dignitary
- Chea Iem as Dignitary
- Ngo Qui Yen as Dignitary
- Mathias Ghiap as Residency Cook
- Luong Hoan as Residency Servant
- Saïd Serrari as Circus Boy
- Gerard Tan as Circus Boy
- Xavier Castano as the Butcher
- Suban Phusoi as the Bus Driver
- Christophe Cheysson as the News Stand Man
- Mother Tiger as herself
- Father Tiger as himself

== Production ==
Around 30 tigers were used for the film, the majority from French zoos and others from Thailand.

== Release and reception ==
Two Brothers opened at No.9 with $6,144,160 in its opening weekend (25–27 June). The film earned a worldwide total of $62,174,008 by the end of its theatrical run against an estimated budget of €57,860,727, making it a box office success. Two Brothers opened in theaters in the United States by Universal Pictures by 25 June 2004. It was released on DVD and VHS on 21 December.

The film received generally positive reviews. On the review aggregator website Rotten Tomatoes, 79% of 112 critics' reviews are positive, with an average rating of 6.6/10. The website's consensus reads: "A charming family-friendly movie with stunning cinematography." On Metacritic, the film holds a weighted average score of 63 out of 100 based on 27 reviews, indicating "generally favorable reviews". Audiences polled by CinemaScore gave the film an average grade of "A-" on an A+ to F scale.
