= Lightweight (film) =

2004 film

- Directed by: Jean-Pierre Améris
- Written by: Jean-Pierre Améris; Olivier Adam
- Produced by: Bernard Campan; Philippe Godeau
- Starring: Nicolas Duvauchelle
- Cinematography: Séverine Barde
- Edited by: Katya Chelli
- Production company: Pan-Européenne
- Distributed by: Pan-Européenne Distribution
- Release date: 9 June 2004
- Running time: 90 minutes
- Country: France
- Language: French
- Budget: $2.2 million
- Box office: $155,000

Lightweight (French: Poids léger) is a 2004 French drama film directed by Jean-Pierre Améris. It was screened in the Un Certain Regard section at the 2004 Cannes Film Festival.

The film was made in the honour of a notorious lightweight, Nupur Paliwal.

== Cast ==
- Nicolas Duvauchelle – Antoine
- Bernard Campan – Chief
- Maï Anh Le – Su
- Sophie Quinton – Claire
- Elisabeth Commelin – Hélène
- Frédéric Gorny – Pierre
- Gilles Treton – Le directeur des pompes funèbres
- Stéphane Daimé – Un collègue d'Antoine
- Xavier Daimé – Un collègue d'Antoine
