= Lila Says =

2004 film by Ziad Doueiri

- Lila Says film poster
- Directed by: Ziad Doueiri
- Written by: "Chimo" (novel); Ziad Doueiri
- Produced by: Marina Gefter
- Starring: Vahina Giocante; Mohammed Khouas
- Cinematography: John Daly
- Edited by: Tina Baz
- Music by: Nitin Sawhney
- Distributed by: Pyramide Distribution
- Release dates: 1 November 2004 (London Film Festival); 26 January 2005 (France)
- Running time: 89 minutes
- Country: France
- Language: French

Lila Says (French title: Lila dit ça) is a 2004 French film directed by Ziad Doueiri. The plot is based on the novel of the same title written by "Chimo" (a pseudonym).

== Plot ==
Chimo (played by Mohammed Khouas) is a nineteen-year-old self-described loser who lives in an Arab ghetto with his mother in post-9/11 Marseille. Unemployed, he turns down an opportunity to study (free of charge) at a writers' school for teenagers in Paris despite showing real promise as a writer. Instead, he wastes his day hanging around with other unemployed and aimless "losers". He falls for Lila (Vahina Giocante), a beautiful blonde sixteen-year-old who just moved into the neighborhood with her eccentric and sexually abusive aunt. Lila is a self-styled "bad girl" who presents an overtly sexual persona; they begin a tentative romance after Lila invites him to look up her skirt while she rides a swing.

Meanwhile, Mouloud (Karim Ben Haddou), Chimo's best friend and leader of their band of friends, also sets his sights on Lila. He begins to sexually harass Lila, not allowing her to walk the streets of the neighborhood unmolested. Chimo's disgust at Mouloud's behaviour towards Lila creates a huge rift between them. Mouloud, resentful of Chimo's changing attitude toward him and Lila's sexual indifference, vents his aggressions by attacking Lila and her aunt at home and raping Lila. Chimo is broken when he discovers Lila was in fact still a virgin, despite her stories of outrageous sexual adventures. This is confirmed by finding her scrapbook showing the sources of the titillating, but fictional, stories she told him. Lila is taken away by her aunt, leaving Chimo heartbroken. He eventually manages to convince a police detective to let him telephone Lila, whereupon he simply says "I love you" and she says "I know". As he remembers his experiences with Lila, he writes about them, winning the writing scholarship he scorned earlier, ultimately changing his life, allowing him to escape the poverty of his home city and to study among the best in Paris. Lila changed Chimo's world, as he did hers.

== Reception ==
On Rotten Tomatoes the film has an approval rating of 68% based on reviews from 40 critics. The site's consensus was, "Lila Says is a vibrantly told coming-of-age story, helped by the sultry charisma of Giocante."

Owen Gleiberman of Entertainment Weekly gave it a grade B+ and called it "[An] unabashedly erotic cross-cultural love story." Kevin Thomas of the Los Angeles Times wrote: "Raw, earthy yet tender and perceptive, Lila Says marks a strong directorial debut for Doueiri."

Derek Elley of Variety magazine called it "All tease and no delivery."

== See also ==
- List of French language films
