= Bad Seeds (2018 film) =

2018 French comedy-drama film

- Film poster
- French: Mauvaises herbes
- Directed by: Kheiron
- Written by: Kheiron
- Produced by: Simon Istolainen
- Starring: Kheiron; Catherine Deneuve; André Dussollier
- Cinematography: Jean-Paul Agostini
- Edited by: Anny Danché
- Distributed by: Mars Films
- Release date: 21 November 2018 (France)
- Running time: 105 minutes
- Country: France
- Language: French

Bad Seeds (French: Mauvaises herbes) is a 2018 French comedy-drama film written and directed by Kheiron who also plays the lead role, with Catherine Deneuve and André Dussollier in starring roles. It was released on 21 November 2018 in cinemas in France, and on 21 December 2018 on Netflix.

The film centers around Waël, a con man whose life is changed when he is forced to work as a mentor for a group of teenagers who face expulsion from school.

== Plot ==
Waël (Kheiron) is a petty criminal who lives with his foster mother Monique (Catherine Deneuve) in a Paris suburb. They get food by conning older grocery shoppers out of their purchases outside a supermarket. One day, when they try to rob Victor (André Dussollier), he recognises Monique as an old friend he had not seen for 30 years. He doesn't press charges in exchange for Waël and Monique working for him on a volunteer basis, Waël as a mentor for troubled teenagers who have been expelled, and Monique as Victor's secretary at the youth club he runs.

Throughout the film, Waël's background is presented in flashbacks to his childhood in Lebanon in a Muslim village. The entire population of the village, including Waël's family, was massacred by Christian and Jewish soldiers when he was very small. He survived alone in a nearby city by picking pockets until he was accepted into an orphanage run by Christian nuns. He befriended the Christian boy Joseph, whose family had been killed by Muslim soldiers. After being sexually abused by one of the teachers, Joseph committed suicide. Some time later, the orphanage was attacked by Muslim extremists and most of the adults and children were killed; Waël escaped the attack, the second massacre in his life, together with one of the nuns.

In the present time, Waël connects with the recalcitrant teenagers, but they only agree to return to the youth club when he offers them €10 per day. There are six students in the group: the intelligent and arrogant Nadia, Shana who admires Nadia with little will of her own, Karim and Ludo who are from neighbouring areas at war with each other, the Romany boy Jimmy who can't read or write and doesn't speak much French, and Fabrice who seems generally disaffected with life. Over the following week, Waël gains their confidence, sometimes by exaggerating his own abilities, or pretending that he has invented important things or coined well-known sayings.

The group bonds and together teach Jimmy to read and Nadia to communicate with more humility. Shana confides in Waël her father has sexually abused her, and he convinces her to tell her mother. Meanwhile, Ludo is being harassed by Franck, an unscrupulous police officer who threatens to tell social services that Ludo's siblings should be placed in foster care unless he agrees to sell drugs for him.

Waël appears to believe that Franck is Ludo's youth worker and tells him the €10 bills he gives to the kids every day are counterfeit. He claims that he regularly buys small sums in counterfeit money to use for minor transactions. Franck asks Waël to provide him with a very large sum in counterfeit bills. Waël reluctantly tells Franck that he will do it and they meet on a rooftop. In a flashback, it is revealed that Karim told Waël about Ludo's trouble with Franck and Waël contacted the police. When Franck realizes has been betrayed, he beats up Waël. The police arrive and arrest Franck as he shoots Waël in the leg.

Waël survives and, in the final scene of the film, the students give him a book of quotations, showing they knew all along he had been pretending to be more than he was. By now they are all returning to the club of their own free will, without being paid for it.

== Cast ==
- Kheiron as Waël
- Catherine Deneuve as Monique
- André Dussollier as Victor
- Louison Blivet as Shana
- Adil Dehbi as Fabrice
- Hakou Benosmane as Karim
- Youssouf Wague as Ludo
- Ouassima Zrouki as Nadia
- Joseph Jovanovic as Jimmy
- Alban Lenoir as Franck
- Ingrid Donnadieu as young Monique
- Leila Boumedjane as Sarah
- Aymen Wardane as little boy Waël
- Elyazid Riha as Joseph
- Fianso as Usamah
- Medine as Djallil

== Reception ==
Bad Seeds received mixed reviews in the press. Fabrice Leclerc who reviewed the movie for Paris Match praised Kheiron's acting skills, while Christophe Carrière in L'Express called him "n'est pas seulement drôle [...] aussi pertinent" ("not only funny but also relevant"). Other reviewers commented on the overly facile way in which conflicts were resolved or overlooked, which Nathalie Simon in Le Figaro called "naïve" while Scott Tobias in New York Times said that the message "...arrives one corny aphorism at a time". Eddie Strait in the Daily Dot, while admitting that the script contained many clichés, thought that the actors made up for it and argued that "...Bad Seeds hits the mark often enough to warrant watching."
