= Natoo =

French Internet celebrity, vlogger and actress (born 1985)

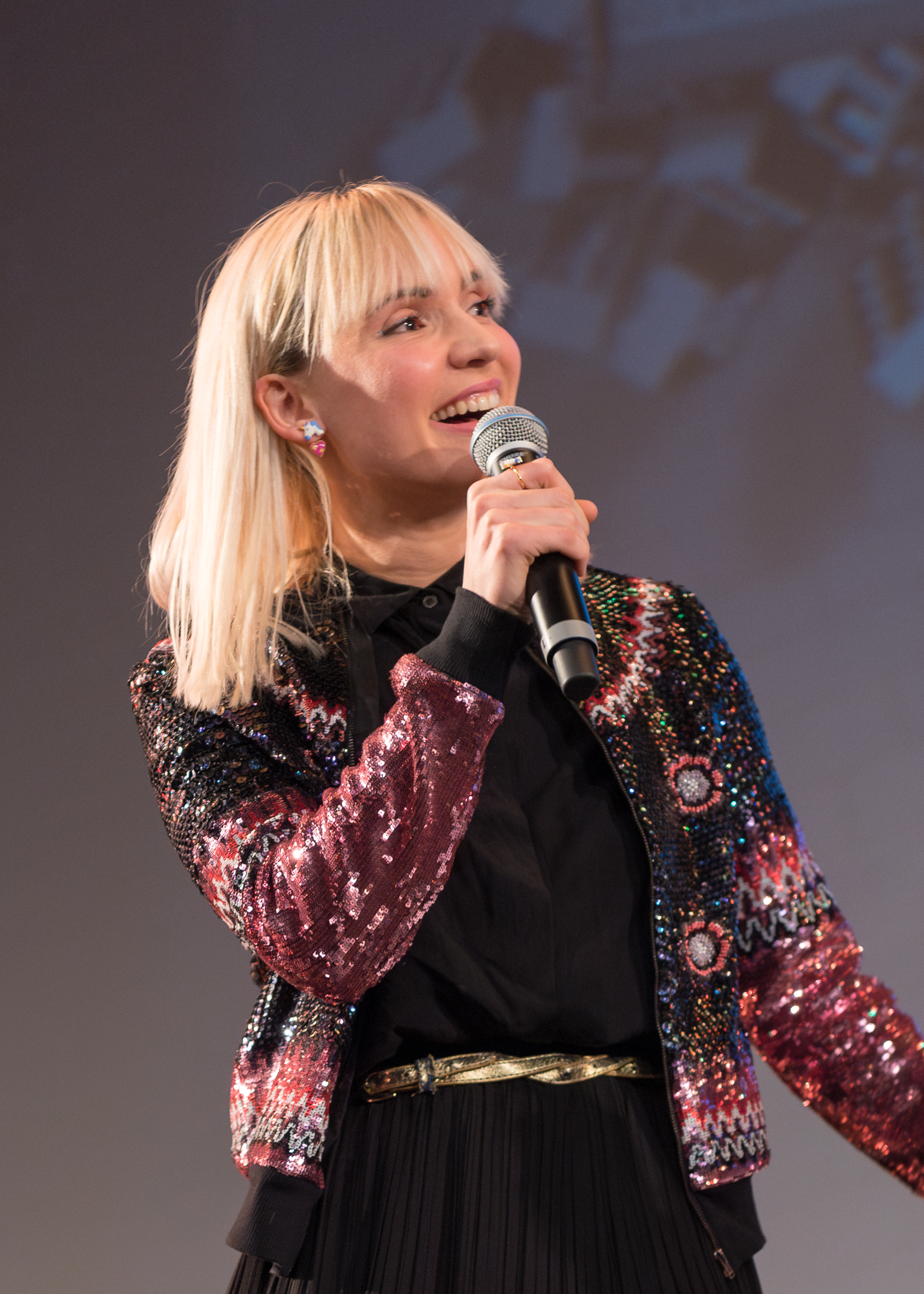
- Natoo in 2017
- Born: Nathalie Odzierejko; February 8, 1985 (age 40)
- Citizenship: France
- Partner: Marc Jarousseau (2011–2018)

Nathalie Odzierejko (born February 8, 1985), better known as Natoo (/ˈnætuː/), is a French Internet celebrity, vlogger and actress of Polish descent. She is also a member of the production collectives "Studio Bagel" and "Le Latte Chaud". In December 2016 her YouTube channel surpassed 5 million subscribers. She is regarded as one of the first French celebrities to become a "youth icon" due to YouTube.

== Early life ==
Nathalie Odzierejko was born and raised in France. She is of Polish origin and was raised by her mother, who works in Pôle emploi, the French employment office. Her father did not live with her; she has only met him once in her life, and, due to the conflict this caused, never wanted to see him again.

== Career ==
Her debut as a videographer started when a video was noticed on the Bapt&Gaël, 10 minutes à perdre website. At that time, she was still working as a policewoman in the Draveil night brigade, located in Essonne. A little later, Odzierejko created her own YouTube channel, named "Natoo", where she would post a couple of videos. When they started growing in popularity, Natoo decided to leave the force in order to spend more time on her YouTube channel.

After joining the Bagel Studio in 2012, Natoo made regular appearances in the Canal+ sketch show Le Dézapping du Before, broadcast until 2015 under the auspices of the youth culture magazine Le Before du Grand Journal.

She has published a satirical book on women's magazines, entitled Icônne, which has sold more than 100,000 copies, and she toured signings throughout France and Belgium.

She participated in the Imagine video Paris, where, with thirty other YouTubers or comedians, signing the song Imagine by John Lennon in tribute to victims of the Paris attacks of 13 November.

In May 2016 she launched her own jewelry brand named Joyau Magique (inspired by the cartoon Starla and the Jewel Riders) containing pins, jewelry, but also clothes, all with the image of stars, her dogs, or unicorns. She created a song called "Je sais pas danser" for the video game Just Dance 2017.

In April 2017, a documentary was aired in which she talked about online harassment.

== Filmography ==
- Female seagull in the French dub of The SpongeBob Movie: Sponge Out of Water (2015)
- Barbara Gordon in the French dub of The Lego Batman Movie (2017)
- AKA (2023)

== Personal life ==
From 2011 to 2018, Natoo was in a relationship with French YouTuber Marc Jarousseau, aka Kemar.
