= Nicolas Duvauchelle =

French actor (born 1980)

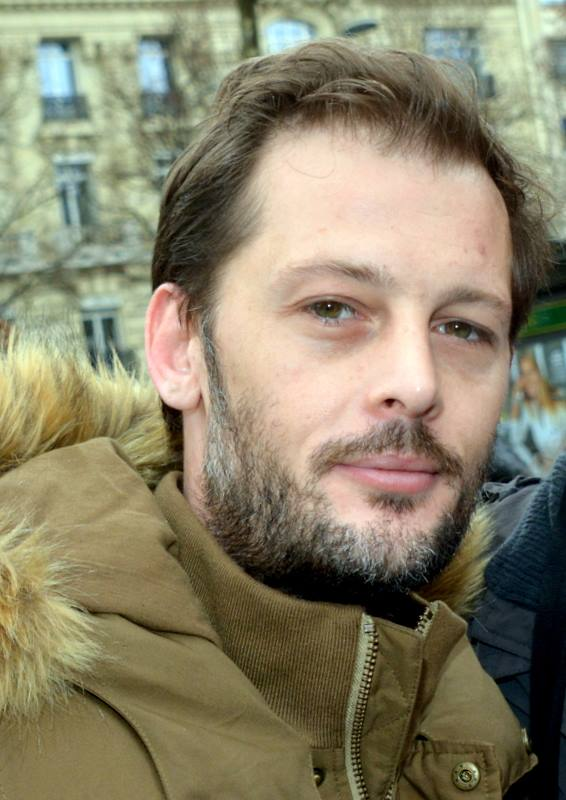
- Nicolas Duvauchelle in 2017
- Born: 27 March 1980 (age 46); Paris, France
- Occupation: Actor
- Years active: 1999–present
- Spouse: Chloé Roy (2024–present)
- Children: 3

Nicolas Duvauchelle (born 27 March 1980) is a French actor. He is best known for his role as Theo in three seasons of the crime drama Braquo.

== Career ==
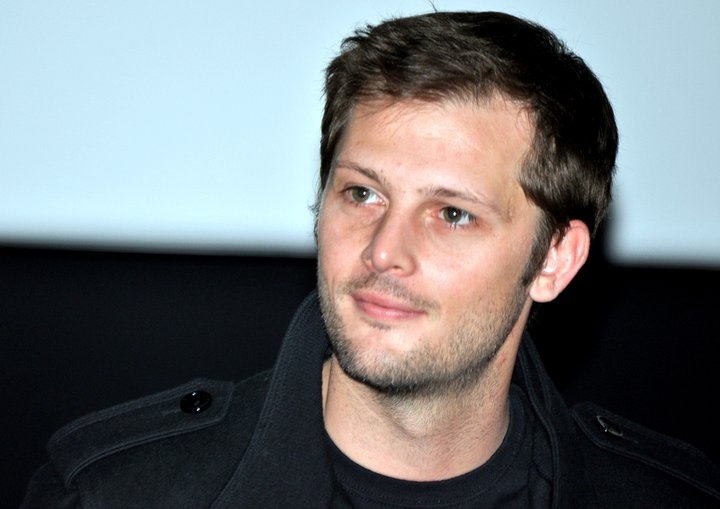
Nicolas Duvauchelle in 2011

Duvauchelle starred in numerous films including Lightweight, À tout de suite and Le Grand Meaulnes. He has worked with Béatrice Dalle on films such as Trouble Every Day and Inside.

== Personal life ==
Duvauchelle has three children: daughters Bonnie (with ex-partner Ludivine Sagnier) who appeared as Véra as a child in Les Bien-aimés, and Romy (with Laura Isaaz, a journalist and sister of actress Alice Isaaz), and son Andrea (with model Anouchka Alsif).

Duvauchelle married his partner of six years, Chloé Roy, on 17 May 2024 in Ploërmel, Brittany, north-western France.

== Filmography ==
Year	Title	Role	Director	Notes
1999	Beau Travail	Legionnaire	Claire Denis	
1999	Le petit voleur	Esse	Erick Zonca	
2000	Du poil sous les roses	Jojo	Jean-Julien Chervier & Agnès Obadia	
2000	Un homme en colère	Kevin	Didier Albert	TV series (1 episode)
2001	Trouble Every Day	Erwan	Claire Denis	
2001	Ligne 208	Pascal	Bernard Dumont	
2002	Les frères Hélias	Raph	Freddy Busso	Short
2003	Les Corps impatients	Paul	Xavier Giannoli	Nominated - César Award for Most Promising Actor
2003	Snowboarder	Gaspard	Olias Barco	
2004	Right Now	Alain	Benoît Jacquot	
2004	Lightweight	Antoine	Jean-Pierre Améris	
2005	Une aventure	Julien	Xavier Giannoli	
2006	Le Grand Meaulnes	Augustin Meaulnes	Jean-Daniel Verhaeghe	
2006	April in Love	Pierre	Gérald Hustache-Mathieu	
2006	Hell	Andrea	Bruno Chiche	
2007	Inside	A cop	Julien Maury and Alexandre Bustillo	
2007	The Second Wind	Antoine	Alain Corneau	
2008	Secret Defense	Pierre	Philippe Haïm	
2008	Rien dans les poches	Étienne Faber	Marion Vernoux	TV movie
2009	The Girl on the Train	Franck	André Téchiné	
2009	Wild Grass	Jean-Mi	Alain Resnais	
2009	White Material	Manuel Vial	Claire Denis	
2009-14	Braquo	Théo Vachewski	Olivier Marchal, Frédéric Schoendoerffer, ...	TV series (17 episodes)
2010	The Blonde with Bare Breasts	Julien Rivera	Manuel Pradal	
2010	Happy Few	Vincent	Antony Cordier	
2011	Polisse	Mathieu	Maïwenn	Nominated - César Award for Best Supporting Actor
2011	The Well-Digger's Daughter	Jacques Mazel	Daniel Auteuil	
2011	Stretch	Thierry	Charles de Meaux	
2011	Nobody Else But You	Fred	Gérald Hustache-Mathieu	
2011	Les yeux de sa mère	Mathieu Roussel	Thierry Klifa	
2012	Just Like Brothers	Elie	Hugo Gélin	
2012	On Air	Lucas	Pierre Pinaud	
2012	Mariage à Mendoza	Antoine	Edouard Deluc	
2013	For a Woman	Jean	Diane Kurys	
2014	Bodybuilder	Fred Morel	Roschdy Zem	
2014	Maintenant ou jamais	Manuel Benetti	Serge Frydman	
2014	Depareillé	The French	Michaël Pierrard	Short
2015	Le combat ordinaire	Marco	Laurent Tuel	
2015	Ollie Boy	Abdel	Paul Garcia & Dimitri Pougnet	Short
2015	Malaterra	Pierre Viviani	Jean-Xavier de Lestrade & Laurent Herbiet	TV mini-series
2016	A Decent Man	Eddy	Emmanuel Finkiel	Nominated - César Award for Best Actor; Nominated - Lumière Award for Best Actor
2016	The Endless River	Gilles	Oliver Hermanus	
2017	Dalida	Richard Chanfray	Lisa Azuelos	
2017	Orpheline		Arnaud des Pallières	
2017	Let the Sunshine In	The actor	Claire Denis	
2017	All That Divides Us	Rodolphe Calavera	Thierry Klifa	
2017	Jour J		Reem Kherici	
2019	Persona non grata	José Montero	Roschdy Zem	
2020	A Mermaid in Paris	Gaspard	Mathias Malzieu	
2020	Lost Bullet	Areski	Guillaume Pierret	
2021	Gone for Good	Fred Lucchesi	David Elkaïm & Vincent Poymiro	TV Series (5 Episodes)
2022	Lost Bullet 2	Areski	Guillaume Pierret	
2023	Cœurs noirs	Martin	Ziad Doueiri	TV series (6 episodes)
2023	Pax Massilia	Franck Murillo		TV series (12 episodes)

== Theater ==
Year	Title	Author	Director	Notes
2000	American Buffalo	David Mamet	Michel Fau	Théâtre du Rond-Point
2014	Des journées entières dans les arbres	Marguerite Duras	Thierry Klifa	Théâtre de la Gaîté-Montparnasse

== Music videos ==
Year	Title	Role	Artist	Ref(s)
2018	Naive	Lead role	Hangman's Chair	
