= Alain Goldman =

French film producer (born 1961)

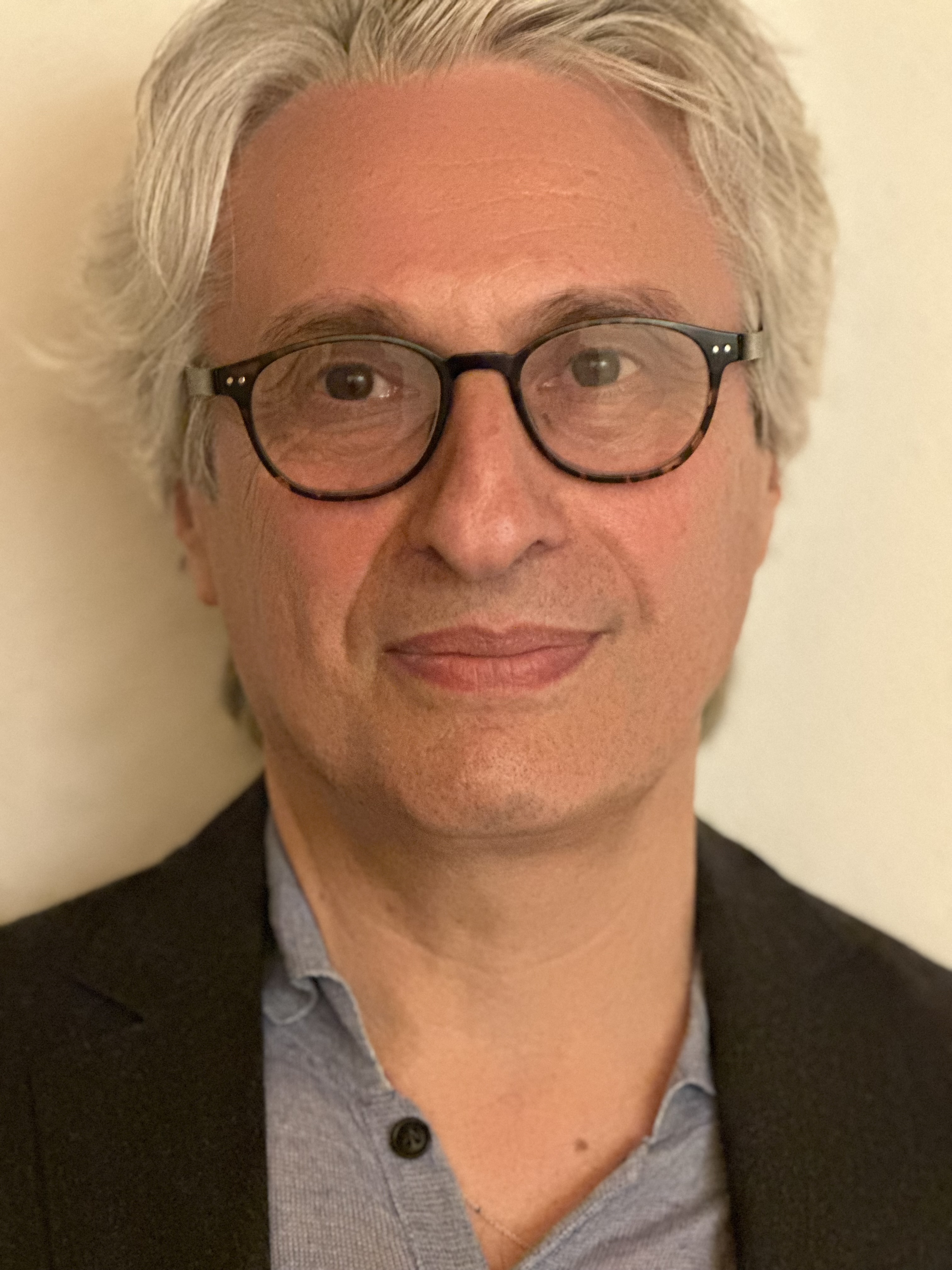
- Born: 12 January 1961 (age 65); Montmartre, Paris, France
- Occupation: Film producer
- Spouse: Roselyne Bosch (m. 1995)
- Children: 2

Alain Goldman, also known as Ilan Goldman (born 12 January 1961), is a French film producer.

== Early life ==
Goldman was born in Montmartre, Paris, the son of Jewish parents. His grandfather was the first representative for Universal Pictures in France, and his father, Daniel Goldman, was the Director General of United International Pictures. After becoming active in the Betar movement, Goldman moved to Israel when he was 18 years old. He attended college there, before returning to France because he missed European culture.

== Career ==
In 1992, Goldman founded the film company Légende Entreprises for the production of his film, 1492: Conquest of Paradise. Subsequently, he produced multiple films, including Casino, The Crimson Rivers, Crimson Rivers II: Angels of the Apocalypse, La Vie en rose, Babylon A.D., Coco, The Round Up, The Man with the Iron Heart, The Mustang, and An Officer and a Spy.

== Personal life ==
He is married to screenwriter and director Roselyne Bosch with whom he has two children.

== Selected filmography ==
- 1492: Conquest of Paradise (1992)
- Casino (1995) executive producer
- Amour et confusions (1997)
- XXL (1997)
- Bimboland (1998)
- Vatel (2000)
- The Crimson Rivers (2000)
- The Code (2002)
- Le pacte du silence (2003)
- Crimson Rivers II: Angels of the Apocalypse (2004)
- The Corsican File (2004)
- La Vie en rose (2007)
- 99 Francs (2007)
- Babylon A.D. (2008)
- Coco (2009)
- Cracks (2009) executive producer
- The Blonde with Bare Breasts (2010)
- The Round Up (2010)
- My Own Love Song (2010)
- Case départ (2011)
- Paulette (2012)
- Vive la France (2013)
- Les gamins (2013)
- Le Crocodile du Botswanga (2014)
- Avis de mistral (2014)
- Resistance (2014) TV miniseries, also director
- The Connection (2014)
- Robin des bois, la véritable histoire (2015)
- All Three of Us (2015) associate producer
- La Tour 2 contrôle infernale (2016)
- Tout, tout de suite (2016)
- La folle histoire de Max et Léon (2016)
- The Man with the Iron Heart (2017)
- Santa & Cie (2017)
- Edmond (2019)
- The Mustang (2019)
- An Officer and a Spy (2019)
- The Spy (2019) a Netflix original series
- The Mad Women's Ball (2021)
- Flashback (2021)
