= Happy Few =

2010 film

- Film poster
- Directed by: Antony Cordier
- Written by: Antony Cordier; Julie Peyr
- Produced by: Pascal Caucheteux; Sebastien Lemercier
- Starring: Marina Foïs; Roschdy Zem; Élodie Bouchez; Nicolas Duvauchelle
- Cinematography: Nicolas Gaurin
- Edited by: Christel Dewynter
- Music by: Mike Kourtzer; Frédéric Verrières
- Production companies: Why Not US; Why Not Productions; France 2 Cinéma
- Distributed by: Oscilloscope Laboratories (USA)
- Release date: 15 September 2010
- Running time: 103 minutes
- Country: France
- Language: French
- Budget: $3.4 million
- Box office: $93,000

Happy Few is a 2010 French romance film directed by Antony Cordier. The film was nominated for the Golden Lion at the 67th Venice International Film Festival. It was released in the US under the title Four Lovers by Oscilloscope Laboratories in theaters and on DVD in 2012. In Europe on DVD it was released as Aimez Qui Vous Voulez, Happy Few.

== Plot ==
Rachel works in a jewelry store. She meets Vincent in the workshop, whom she immediately likes. She is quickly seduced by his openness and so she decides to organize a dinner with their respective spouses, Franck and Teri. Both couples become friends during the meeting and consequently they fall in love with each other. Even if it happened unintentionally, the two couples become inseparable.

They surrender to their passion blindly, without rules and without lies. They keep the secret from the children and their own parents and their familiar everyday life continues as usual. However, emotional chaos soon ensues and jealousy grows.

== Cast ==
- Marina Foïs as Rachel
- Roschdy Zem as Franck
- Élodie Bouchez as Teri
- Nicolas Duvauchelle as Vincent
- Jean-François Stévenin as Rachel's father
- Blanche Gardin as Rachel's sister
- Alexia Stresi as Diane
- Geneviève Mnich as Franck's mother
- Philippe Paimblanc as Franck's father
- Ilona Caly as Thelma
- Naomi Ferreira as Margot
- Ferdinand Ledoux as Tim
