= Lost Bullet (2020 film) =

2020 film

- Promotional release poster
- French: Balle perdue
- Directed by: Guillaume Pierret
- Written by: Guillaume Pierret; Alban Lenoir; Kamel Guemra
- Starring: Alban Lenoir; Nicolas Duvauchelle; Ramzy Bedia
- Production companies: Inoxy Films; Nolita TV; Versus Production
- Distributed by: Netflix
- Release date: June 19, 2020
- Running time: 92 minutes
- Country: France
- Language: French

Lost Bullet (French: Balle perdue) is a 2020 French action thriller film directed by Guillaume Pierret, written by Guillaume Pierret, Alban Lenoir and Kamel Guemra and starring Alban Lenoir, Nicolas Duvauchelle and Ramzy Bedia. It was Pierret's first feature film.

Lost Bullet tells the story of an auto mechanic forced to go on the run and battle corrupt police officers when framed for murder. The action relies heavily on practical stuntwork and effects.

A Netflix production, the film was released globally on June 19, 2020. It became a streaming hit and received generally favorable reviews, launching a franchise. A sequel, Lost Bullet 2, was released in 2022, and a third film, Last Bullet, was released in 2025. It is first installment in the Lost Bullet film series.

== Plot ==
Lino (Alban Lenoir), a mechanic, builds an armoured Renault Clio to smash into a jewelry store to rob it and help his foster brother Quentin (Rod Paradot) pay a debt. When the car smashes through several walls more than expected, Quentin escapes but Lino is arrested and imprisoned. He is put on day release by police detective Charas (Ramzy Bedia) to work for a special drug squad, engineering police cars to catch drug runners at speed by ramming vehicles. Eventually Charas gets him a pardon and a garage to work in.

When Charas and Lino visit Quentin to investigate his possible involvement in building the drug runners' "go-fast" cars, two corrupt members of Charas' squad--Areski (Nicolas Duvauchelle) and Marco (Sébastien Lalanne)--shoot and kill Charas. Lino flees, but is soon arrested. The drug runners apparently destroy Charas' car, a Renault 21. Areski interrogates Lino at the station, and when he refuses to agree to lie for Areski, Areski frames Lino for the murder. Lino breaks free of the interrogation room and fights through ten officers to escape. He approaches another squad member, his lover Julia (Stéfi Celma), who fights him and unsuccessfully attempts to arrest him. Lino realizes that the burnt car the police recovered is not Charas' Renault, as they assumed.

Lino returns to the junkyard where Charas was shot, and he and Quentin overpower the drug runners and escape. Quentin tells him where the Renault--still containing the fatal bullet from Areski's gun--is hidden. Marco and Areski murder the drug runners; Marco learns of the Renault's preservation but conceals it from Areski. Julia meets with Lino, and Quentin's testimony and other evidence leads her to believe Lino; she helps him escape from the corrupt police officers following her. Lino, Quentin, and Marco arrive separately at the farm with the hidden Renault. Marco fatally shoots Quentin, but is overpowered and killed by Lino. Before dying, Quentin reveals the Renault's hiding place.

Areski learns of the evidence against him and takes the corrupt police brigade to try to stop Lino before he can reach the headquarters. However, Lino equips the red Renault turbo with bullbars and rams, destroying one of their cars and smashing through their barricade. He and Julia fight Areski, crashing his car. Areski sets the Renault on fire, but Lino drives it to the garage to extinguish the flames. The bullet is extracted by forensics, Areski goes on the run, and Lino is reunited with Julia and reinstated with the team.

== Cast ==
- Alban Lenoir as Lino
- Nicolas Duvauchelle as Areski
- Ramzy Bedia as Charas
- Stéfi Celma as Julia
- Rod Paradot as Quentin
- Sébastien Lalanne as Marco
- Arthur Aspaturian as Kad
- Patrick Médioni as Jacques
- Alexandre Philip as Jeff
- Stephen Scardicchio as Policier BAC
- Damien Leconte as Policier Commissariat
- Thibaut Evrard as Lieutenant Bruno
- Anne Serra as Areski's Wife
- Lino Lenoir as Areski's Child
- Pascale Arbillot as Moss

== Production ==
Lost Bullet was financed by Netflix and released directly to streaming. It was entirely filmed in the Mediterranean port city of Sète, Languedoc, France. Director Guillaume Pierret was particularly influenced by Paul Greengrass' The Bourne Supremacy and the US television series The Shield, admiring the immediacy of their action sequences and practical effects. Pierret also drew on the vehicle combat of the Mad Max films. He described Lost Bullet as an equal mix of French, American, and Asian action styles. It was Pierret's first feature film.

Filming took place relatively quickly; for example, the entire farm sequence--in which Lino arrives, argues with Quentin, fights Marco, finds the car, and equips it for battle--was filmed in a single long day of shooting.

== Release ==
=== Streaming ===
Lost Bullet was released on Netflix globally on June 19, 2020. The film was a streaming hit, and was watched more than 37 million times in the first month of its release.

== Reception ==
=== Critical response ===
On the review aggregator website Rotten Tomatoes, 67% of critics' reviews are positive, with an average rating of 9/10. Metacritic, which uses a weighted average, assigned the film a score of 78 out of 100, based on 4 critics, indicating "generally favorable" reviews.

Jordan Mintzer of The Hollywood Reporter described Lost Bullet as "probably one of the best Gallic action movies to come along in a while", praising Lenoir's stunts and the practical effects of the car chases. Writing in The New York Times, Elisabeth Vincentelli called the film an "impressively lean French thriller wastes nothing in its quest to deliver the goods", saying that a sequel "can’t come quickly enough". Kenneth Lowe, writing in Paste, called it "an entertaining, well-staged action flick that does much well even if it does little new."

In a more negative review, Jonathon Wilson of Ready Steady Cut called it "a bland, thin, formulaic genre vehicle" and "another forgettable action flick in the Netflix thumbnails".

== Sequels ==
A sequel, Lost Bullet 2 (French: Balle perdue 2), was released on Netflix in November 2022. The sequel also received positive reviews and became the most-watched movie on Netflix that was not in English. Variety described it as the first internationally successful French action franchise since Luc Besson's Taxi films.

A third film, Last Bullet (French: Balle Perdue 3), was released in May 2025, again to positive reviews.
