= French Blood =

- Film poster
- Directed by: Diastème
- Written by: Diastème
- Produced by: Marielle Duigou; Philippe Lioret
- Starring: Alban Lenoir; Samuel Jouy; Paul Hamy
- Cinematography: Philippe Guilbert
- Edited by: Chantal Hymans
- Production companies: Fin Août Productions; Mars Films; France 3 Cinéma
- Distributed by: Mars Distribution
- Release date: 10 June 2015
- Running time: 98 minutes
- Country: France
- Language: French
- Budget: $4 million
- Box office: $305.000

French Blood (original title: Un Français) is a 2015 French drama film written and directed by Diastème. It was selected to screen in the Platform section of the 2015 Toronto International Film Festival.

== Cast ==
- Alban Lenoir as Marco Lopez
- Samuel Jouy as Braguette
- Paul Hamy as Grand-Guy
- Olivier Chenille as Marvin
- Jeanne Rosa as Kiki
- Patrick Pineau as the pharmacist
- Lucie Debay as Corinne
- Blandine Pelissier as Marco's mother
- Frédéric Andrau as Police inspector
- Julien Honoré as Calou
- Andréa Brusque as Hermione
- Pierre-Benoist Varoclier as The drunk

== Accolades ==
Award / Film Festival	Category	Recipients and nominees	Result
Lumière Awards	Best Male Revelation	Alban Lenoir	Nominated
