= Alban Lenoir =

French actor

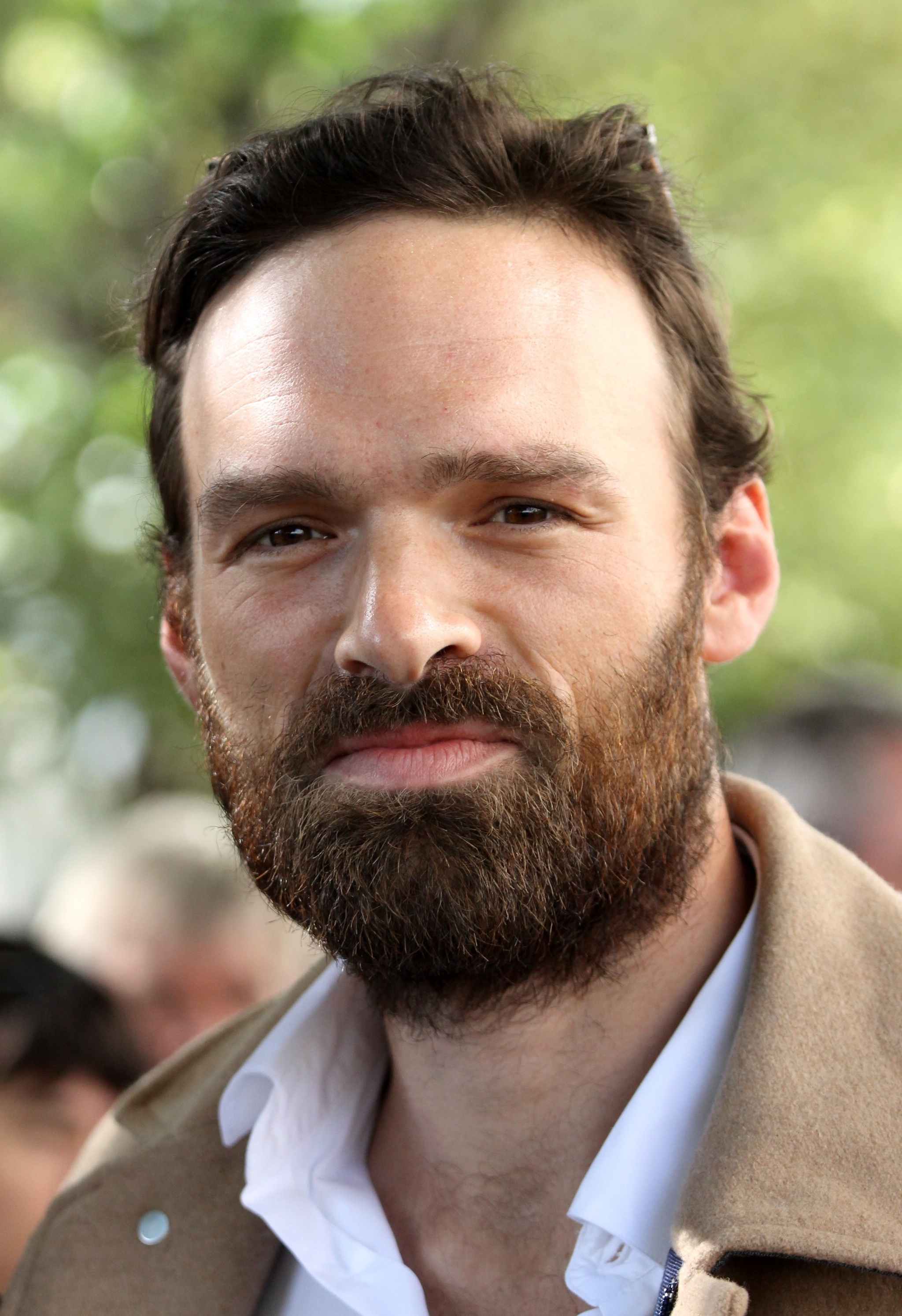
- Lenoir in 2016
- Born: 16 December 1980 (age 45); Dijon, France
- Occupations: Actor, screenwriter, producer, stuntman
- Years active: 2002–present

Alban Lenoir (born 16 December 1980) is a French actor. He was nominated for the Lumière Award for Best Male Revelation for his leading role in the film French Blood (2015).

== Biography ==
Lenoir was born in Dijon, in Burgundy, and raised there by a single mother. After seeing Bloodsport when he was nine, he decided that he wanted to become an action movie actor, and left home at 17 to pursue his dream.

As a stuntman, Lenoir has worked on Les Brigades du Tigre (2006), Taken (2008), Hero Corp (2008–2010), The Princess of Montpensier (2010), Outside the Law (2010), Point Blank (2010), Erased (2012), AKA (2023) and Lost Bullet (2020).

Lenoir is married to actress Anne Serra, whom he met on the set of The Squad in 2015. They have a son, Lino, born in 2018.

== Theater ==
Year	Title	Author	Director
2005	Entre deux	Simon Astier & Alban Lenoir	Alban Lenoir
2010	Le carton	Clément Michel	Alexis Plaire
2011–12	Lady Oscar	Guillaume Mélanie	Éric Civanyan

== Filmography ==
Year	Title	Role	Director	Notes
2002	The Truth About Charlie	Skinhead	Jonathan Demme	
2002	Sami	A student	Patrice Martineau	TV series (1 episode)
2003	Monsieur N.	A carrier	Antoine de Caunes	
2004	Cash Truck	Gunman	Nicolas Boukhrief	
2004	Acharnés	Cop	Régis Mardon	Short
2005	Nouveau monde	Alex	Mathieu Lalande, Morgan S. Dalibert, ...	
2005	6 Hours	Concurrent 4	Julien Lacombe & Pascal Sid	Short
2006	Les Aristos	Bad guy 2	Charlotte de Turckheim	
2006	The Green Hornet		Aurélien Poitrimoult	Short
2006	Boulevard du Palais	Gilles Ravelli	Philippe Venault	TV series (1 episode)
2006	Fête de famille	Cop	Lorenzo Gabriele	TV series (1 episode)
2006	Kaamelott	Ferghus	Alexandre Astier	TV series (15 episodes)
2007	Pur week-end	Cop 2	Olivier Doran	
2007	White & Jackson	White	Thibault Mombellet	Short
2007	Ils ne viennent qu'une fois	The biker	Mathieu Lalande	Short
2007	Un flic	The leader	Frédéric Tellier	TV series (1 episode)
2007	Sauveur Giordano	Planton	Dominique Tabuteau	TV series (1 episode)
2007–08	Off Prime	JB	Stéphane Kopecky, Bruno Solo, ...	Also Writer; TV Series (11 episodes)
2008	Taken	Security agent	Pierre Morel	
2008	Les enfants d'Orion	Ben	Philippe Venault	TV movie
2008	Central nuit	Vigny	Olivier Barma	TV series (1 episode)
2008–17	Hero Corp	Klaus	Simon Astier & Sébastien Lalanne	Creator; TV Series (77 episodes)
2009	Le missionnaire	Car salesman	Roger Delattre	
2010	Hope	The Boyfriend	Cedric Jouarie	Short
2010	Sable noir	Mathias	Julien Seri	TV series (1 episode)
2011	L'art de séduire	Philippe	Guy Mazarguil	
2011	Cliffhanger	Vincent	William S. Touitou	Short
2011	La vitesse du passé	Joseph	Dominique Rocher	Short
2011	Juste avant l'aube	Nice guy	Romain Quirot	Short
2011	Pour Djamila	Capitaine D.	Caroline Huppert	TV movie
2011	Saïgon, l'été de nos 20 ans	Pujol	Philippe Venault	TV Mini-Series
2011	Interpol	Pierre Combaz	Nicolas Herdt	TV series (1 episode)
2012	Bye Bye Blondie	Cop	Virginie Despentes	
2012	Le clown de Belleville	Tristan	Benjamin Nicolas	Short
2012	WorkinGirls	Window cleaner	Sylvain Fusée	TV series (1 episode)
2012	Enquêtes réservées	Ralph	Laurent Carcélès & Christophe Barbier	TV series (8 episodes)
2013	The Informant	Philippe	Julien Leclercq	
2013	Les gamins	Romain	Anthony Marciano	
2013	Hero Corp: les survivants	Klaus	Simon Astier	TV Mini-Series
2013	Détectives	Arnaud	Lorenzo Gabriele	TV series (1 episode)
2013–15	Lazy Company	Lee Junior Chester	Samuel Bodin	TV series (31 episodes)
2014	Goal of the Dead	Sam Lorit	Thierry Poiraud & Benjamin Rocher	
2014	Hero Corp: La voie de Klaus	Klaus	Simon Astier	TV Mini-Series
2014	Les Petits Meurtres d'Agatha Christie	Paul Coupet	Eric Woreth	TV series (1 episode)
2014	Le sang de la vigne	Aurélien Orgelet	Régis Musset	TV series (1 episode)
2015	French Blood	Marco Lopez	Diastème	Nominated - Lumière Award for Best Male Revelation
2015	The Squad	Cartier	Benjamin Rocher	
2015	Drama	Peter	Sophie Mathisen	
2016	Brice 3	Gregor d'Hossegor	James Huth	
2016	La folle histoire de Max et Léon	Resistant	Jonathan Barré	
2016	T.A.N.K	Sneaky Braun	Samuel Bodin	TV Mini-Series
2017	Sparring	Marvin Mathis	Samuel Jouy	
2017	Le semeur	Jean	Marine Francen	
2017	Arborg	Jean	Antoine Delelis	Short
2017	Hero Corp: Archives	Klaus	Simon Astier	TV Mini-Series
2018	Angel Face	Julio	Vanessa Filho	
2018	Bad Seeds (Mauvaises Herbes)	Franck	Kheiron	
2018	L'Amazone	Olivier	Alexandra Naoum	Short
2018	T.A.N.K 2	Sneaky Braun	Samuel Bodin	TV Mini-Series
2018	Les Emmerdeurs	Soldier Hangar 407	Morgan S. Dalibert & Valentin Vincent	TV series (1 episode)
2019	L'intervention	André Gerval	Fred Grivois	
2019	The Shiny Shrimps (Les crevettes pailletées)	Jean	Maxime Govare & Cédric Le Gallo	
2019	Marianne (TV series)	Inspector Ronan	Samuel Bodin	TV series (8 episodes)
2019	La forêt de mon père	Véro Cratzborn		
2020	Lost Bullet	Lino	Guillaume Pierret	Netflix
2021	La Bonne Conduite	Pierre	Arnaud Bédouet	
2022	Bigbug	Greg	Jean-Pierre Jeunet	Netflix
2022	Lost Bullet 2	Lino	Guillaume Pierret	Netflix
2023	AKA	Adam Franco	Morgan S. Dalibert	Netflix
2023	Antigang, la relève	Niels Cartier	Benjamin Rocher	Disney Plus
2024	The Wages of Fear	Alex	Julien Leclercq	Netflix
2025	Last Bullet	Lino	Guillaume Pierret	Netflix
