= Les Gamins =

- Film poster
- Directed by: Anthony Marciano
- Written by: Anthony Marciano; Max Boublil; Noé Debré; Mona Achache
- Produced by: Alain Goldman; Simon Istolainen
- Starring: Alain Chabat; Max Boublil; Sandrine Kiberlain; Mélanie Bernier
- Cinematography: Jean-Paul Agostini
- Edited by: Virginie Bruant; Samuel Danési
- Music by: Anthony Marciano
- Production companies: Légende Films; Gaumont; TF1 Films Production; Adama Pictures; PeopleForCinema Productions; Bamago
- Distributed by: Gaumont
- Release date: 17 April 2013
- Running time: 95 minutes
- Country: France
- Language: French
- Budget: $9.7 million
- Box office: $14 million

Les Gamins (French: [le ɡamɛ̃], meaning "The Kids") is a 2013 French comedy film.

== Plot ==
Thomas is a young man with aspirations for a career in music. Gilbert, married to Suzanne for 30 years and soon to be Thomas's father-in-law, is also the father of Lola, Thomas's bride-to-be. Weary of his mundane married life, Gilbert makes a bold decision one day to embark on a new chapter, taking Thomas along with him to prevent him from falling into the same monotonous routine. This fresh start for both of them opens up a new perspective on life, free from the constraints of daily worries, while also presenting the opportunity to forge new experiences.

== Cast ==
- Alain Chabat : Gilbert
- Max Boublil : Thomas Brenner
- Sandrine Kiberlain : Suzanne
- Mélanie Bernier : Lola
- Arié Elmaleh : Carl
- Elisa Sednaoui : Irène
- Alban Lenoir : Romain
- François Dunoyer : Claude
- Nicolas Briançon : Bruno
- Mélusine Mayance : Mimi Zozo
- Iggy Pop : Himself
- Patrick Bruel : The Lookalike
- Kheiron : Reza Sadeqi
- Sébastien Castro : Dédé
- Thomas Solivérès : Augustin
- Stéphane Custers : Jean-Marie
