= Samourais =

Samouraïs
- Directed by: Giordano Gederlini
- Written by: Matt Alexander; Giordano Gederlini
- Produced by: Olivier Delbosc; Marc Missonnier
- Starring: Cyril Mourali; Maï Anh Le; Yasuaki Kurata; Jean-François Lénogue
- Cinematography: Pierre Aïm; Tony Cheung
- Edited by: Scott Stevenson
- Music by: Kenji Kawai
- Release date: 2002
- Running time: 90 minutes
- Countries: Spain; France; Germany
- Budget: $7,620,000
- Box office: $1,781,339

Samourais is a 2002 martial arts film starring Cyril Mourali, Jean-François Lénogue, Mai Anh Le and Yasuaki Kurata. It was directed by Giordano Gederlini and written by Matt Alexander and Alexandre Coquelle.

== Plot ==
Centuries ago, a samurai clan in Japan made a pact with a powerful demon named Kodeni to defeat its enemies. The demon did what they asked, but the price was a terrible curse placed on the clan and its descendants. That ancient curse hangs over the story and slowly connects to events in the present. The film jumps forward to modern times, where Morio Fujiwara, a Tokyo police inspector and descendant of the cursed clan, begins investigating the gruesome murder of a video‑game designer whose new fighting game seems strangely linked to samurai mythology and demonic imagery.

As Fujiwara digs deeper, he realizes that the game is not just entertainment: it is tied to the old demon Kodeni and may act as a kind of modern conduit for the curse. The more he investigates, the more the supernatural element becomes clear. Strange killings and signs suggest that Kodeni has found a way to re‑enter the world, using technology and human ambition as tools. Fujiwara finally uncovers a horrifying truth: the demon is preparing to be reborn in his own family line. His pregnant daughter, Akemi, is at the center of this prophecy, and her unborn child is meant to become the demon’s new incarnation.

This discovery sends Fujiwara on a desperate mission. Akemi is living in Paris, far from Tokyo, trying to have a normal life, unaware of the full danger. Fujiwara travels there to find her and protect her, but he is not the only one interested in the child. Various forces, both human and supernatural, close in around Akemi—some trying to ensure the demon’s rebirth, others trying to stop it. Fujiwara is torn between his duty as a father and grandfather and his responsibility to prevent a demonic catastrophe that could threaten many lives.

The film builds toward a confrontation where Fujiwara must face the reality of the curse and make an impossible choice: whether to sacrifice his own blood to break the demon’s return, or risk allowing Kodeni to be born and unleash its power in the modern world. The emotional core of the story is this conflict between family love, inherited guilt from the clan’s ancient deal, and the larger fate of humanity. The movie mixes police investigation, martial‑arts and action scenes, and supernatural horror, always circling back to the same central dilemma: how far a parent will go to protect both their child and the wider world.

== Cast ==
Cyril Mourali – Marco

Maï Anh Lê – Akemi (Inspector Morio Fujiwara’s daughter)

Yasuaki Kurata – Commissioner Morio Fujiwara

Saïd Serrari – Nadir

Santi Sudaros – Kodeni (the demon)

Dara-Indo Oum – Nakatomi

Kevin Peracini – Léo

Hidetoshi Nakahashi – The Samurai

Yusuke Hirayama – Inspector Endo

Pascal Gentil – Nabil

Omar Sy – Tyson

Tsuyu Shimizu – The Samurai’s daughter

David Forax – Thai boxer
