= The Green Hornet (2006 film) =

- Film poster
- Directed by: Aurélien Poitrimoult
- Written by: George W. Trendle
- Produced by: Aurélien Poitrimoult; Manu Lanzi
- Starring: Manu Lanzi; Patrick Vo
- Edited by: Jean Yves Goyon
- Music by: Dominique Legitimus
- Distributed by: Apel Productions
- Release date: 8 June 2006
- Running time: 10 minutes
- Country: France
- Language: English

The Green Hornet (French: Le frelon vert) is a 2006 French superhero short film, based on The Green Hornet character created by George W. Trendle and Fran Striker.

== Plot ==
The Green Hornet attempts to prove his innocence by capturing a criminal. While tracking him, the Green Hornet is ambushed. He and Kato must fight off the goons and prove their innocence.

== Cast ==
- Manu Lanzi as The Green Hornet
- Patrick Vo as Kato
- Alban Lenoir
