= Bellamy (film) =

- Directed by: Claude Chabrol
- Written by: Claude Chabrol; Odile Barski
- Starring: Gérard Depardieu; Clovis Cornillac; Jacques Gamblin; Marie Bunel
- Cinematography: Eduardo Serra
- Music by: Matthieu Chabrol
- Release dates: 8 February 2009 (Berlin Film Festival); 25 February 2009 (France)
- Running time: 110 minutes
- Country: France
- Language: French

Bellamy — known as Inspector Bellamy in the U.S. — is a French murder mystery film released in 2009. It is the last theatrical film of celebrated French director Claude Chabrol, who died the following year, and the only time he worked with star Gérard Depardieu. Chabrol said in an interview that the film is like a "novel that Simenon never wrote", a kind of "Maigret on vacation". The film was screened in the Berlinale Special section at the 59th Berlin International Film Festival in February 2009, where Chabrol received a Berlinale Camera award for his contributions to cinema.

== Plot summary ==
Inspector Paul Bellamy (Depardieu) is a seasoned Parisian police detective on vacation with his wife Françoise (Marie Bunel) at her family home in Nîmes. Their tranquil holiday is complicated when he cannot resist becoming involved in the case of a man, insurance broker Emile Leullet (Jacques Gamblin), who recently attempted to fake his own death in a car crash for his mistress (Vahina Giocante) and the insurance money. Leullet, hiding under an assumed name and altered appearance and unsure what to do now, seeks out Bellamy for help. (Bellamy is a celebrity and well known throughout France through his published memoirs, which reveal he has a "soft spot for murderers".) Leullet may or may not have killed the homeless man whose corpse was found burned in his car. The dead man, Denis Leprince (also played by Gamblin), was a son of a local judge, now also dead. Bellamy's alcoholic half-brother Jacques Lebas (Clovis Cornillac) shows up unexpectedly and soon he and Paul are bickering bitterly and Paul is back on the bottle himself, which he had previously given up. Françoise is not thrilled with all the disruptions. In between socializing with their gay dentist friend and his partner and quarreling with Jacques, Paul finds time to informally interview and repeatedly question Leullet, Leullet's wife, Leullet's mistress, Leprince's former lover, and many other local denizens. As things become more complicated, family tensions threaten to overwhelm professional obligations. Paul, a professional tough guy, finds himself pondering the meaning of his own life and relationships. Leullet turns himself in to the clueless local police chief who, apparently, has been sleeping with the mistress. He is acquitted at the trial where he is represented (at Bellamy's suggestion) by Leprince's girlfriend's lawyer who renders the defense (also at Bellamy's suggestion) in the form of a Georges Brassens song. (Brassens was a local Sète hero and had been something of an obsession for Leprince.) Jacques absconds with Paul's car and is soon reported dead in a car crash, but only after Paul has revealed to Françoise the dark secret underlying his fraught relationship with his half-brother and the source of his lifelong tristesse. The film ends with a W.H. Auden epigram: "There is always another story/There is more than meets the eye".

== Cast ==
- Gérard Depardieu as Paul Bellamy
- Clovis Cornillac as Jacques Lebas
- Jacques Gamblin as Noël Gentil/Emile Leullet/Denis Leprince
- Marie Bunel as Françoise Bellamy
- Vahina Giocante as Nadia Sancho
- Rodolphe Pauly as l'avocat
- Adrienne Pauly as Claire Bonheur
- Marie Matheron as Madame Leullet
- Dominique Ratonnat as le médecin
- Yves Verhoeven as Alain
- Henri Cohen as le président du tribunal
- Thomas Chabrol as le type au tribunal
- Bruno Abraham-Kremer as Bernard

== Production ==
=== Development ===
Chabrol conceived Bellamy as a tribute to Belgian author Georges Simenon and his famous detective character Inspector Maigret. In describing the film, Chabrol stated his desire was "to create an homage to Simenon" and noted that he felt "Gérard Depardieu is so profoundly simenonesque." The film also served as a tribute to singer Georges Brassens, whose music and persona play a significant role in the narrative.

=== Cinematography ===
The film was shot by acclaimed Portuguese cinematographer Eduardo Serra, who had previously collaborated with Chabrol on several films including A Girl Cut in Two (2007) and Comedy of Power (2006). Serra's work on Bellamy has been described as giving the film a "dappled and lovely" quality that appears "quintessentially 'Romantic French.'"

== Themes and style ==
Rather than functioning primarily as a conventional mystery thriller, Bellamy is better characterized as a character study examining the psychological depths of its protagonist. Critics have noted that the film prioritizes exploring Bellamy's personal relationships—particularly with his wife and troubled half-brother—over the mechanics of the central murder mystery. The film has been described as dealing with themes of family dysfunction, professional identity, and the ambiguity of human nature.

Chabrol's approach in Bellamy has been compared to Simenon's writing style for the Maigret novels, with the actual plot details being secondary to the character portraits and interpersonal dynamics. The film employs a deliberately leisurely pace and treats dramatic moments as "mere chatty conversations" rather than suspenseful set pieces.

== Reception ==
=== Critical response ===
Bellamy received generally positive reviews from critics. The review aggregator Rotten Tomatoes rates the film at 88% favorable based on 26 reviews. However, the film proved somewhat divisive, with a notable disparity between critical acclaim and more mixed audience reactions, with audiences rating it at 37% on Rotten Tomatoes.

Critics praised the performances, particularly those of Depardieu, Marie Bunel, and Clovis Cornillac. Depardieu's portrayal of the aging detective has been described as "complex, haunting and real," with particular note made of the chemistry between Depardieu and Bunel as a "joyous" depiction of late-middle-age sexuality.

The New York Times review by A. O. Scott characterized it as a work where Chabrol's "craft, confidence and unshowy professionalism drives this crafty story even as it turns the conventions of the murder mystery inside out."

Some reviewers felt the film was too slow-paced or that the mystery elements were underdeveloped, with the convoluted family drama overshadowing the central investigation. However, supporters of the film argued that this was precisely Chabrol's intention—to create a meditative character piece rather than a conventional thriller.

=== Festival screenings ===
The film had its world premiere at the 59th Berlin International Film Festival on February 8, 2009, in the Berlinale Special section. It subsequently received its North American premiere at the Rendez-Vous with French Cinema festival at Lincoln Center in March 2009.

== Chabrol's final work ==
Bellamy represents Claude Chabrol's final theatrical feature film, released just over a year before his death on September 12, 2010. Following Bellamy, Chabrol directed two television films for France 2's Maupassant series. The film has been viewed by critics as "a suitable swan song" for the director, commemorating his fifty-year filmmaking career with a meditation on aging, mortality, and the complexities of human relationships—themes that had preoccupied Chabrol throughout his work.
