= Vahina Giocante =

French actress (born 1981)

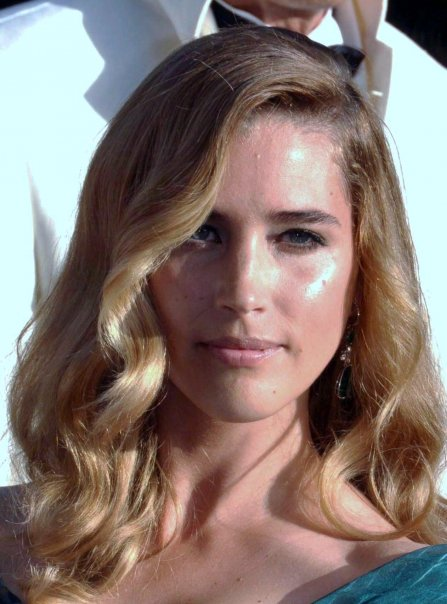
- Vahina Giocante, 2009
- Born: 30 June 1981 (age 45); Orléans, France
- Occupation: Actress

Vahina Giocante (born 30 June 1981) is a French actress.

== Career ==
As Marie in Marie Baie des Anges (1997), she is among a group of young wanderers who become enmeshed in love, hate, and violence on the French Riviera.

In 1999, she appeared in No Scandal (French: Pas de scandale) directed by Benoît Jacquot.

In the 2004 film directed by Ziad Doueiri, Lila Says (French title: Lila dit ça), Giocante portrays a teenager who resides with her aunt in a rough neighborhood in Marseille. Chief film critic for The New York Times A. O. Scott compared her to Brigitte Bardot in And God Created Woman, being "a femme more vital than fatale". He further wrote "Ms. Giocante's intoxicating mixture of gamine innocence and womanly knowingness is almost too much for the movie but her charisma ... give it a mood that is at once breathlessly romantic and cannily down to earth."

In 2009, she appeared in Bellamy, the last film of celebrated French director Claude Chabrol.

== Personal life ==
Vahina Giocante is of half Corsican and half Andalusian origin. She lived in Corsica until the age of 10. Born in Orléans, she went to school at the Lycée Paul-Cézanne in Aix-en-Provence.

In February 2024, Giocante accused director Benoît Jacquot of sexually abusing her.

== Selected filmography ==
- Stereo Girls (2025) – Sylviane
- SKAM France (2021) – Céline Prigent
- Mata Hari (2017) – Mata Hari
- Paradise Cruise (2013) – Dora
- Un prince (presque) charmant (2013) – Marie
- Turf (2013) - Banette Delgado
- 30 Beats (2011) – Kim
- La blonde aux seins nus (2010)
- Trader Games (Original title: Krach (2010)
- Le Premier Cercle (2009) – Elodie
- Bellamy (2009) – Nadia Sancho
- Secret Défense (2008) – (Diane / Lisa)
- 99 Francs (2007) – Sophie
- A Curtain Raiser (2006) – Rosette
- U (2006) – (voice)
- Riviera (2005) – Stella
- Nuit noire, 17 octobre 1961 (2005) (TV) – Marie-Hélène
- Lila dit ça ("Lila Says") (2004) – Lila
- Cadeau d'Éléna, Le ("Elena's Gift") (2004) – Marie
- Maigret: Les petits cochons sans queue (2004) (TV) – Germaine Leblanc
- Blueberry: L'expérience secrète ("Renegade") (2004) – Madeleine
- Intermittenze del cuore, Le (2003) – young Fiametta
- Soldats de Salamine ("Soldiers of Salamina") (2003) – assistante sociale à Dijon
- Vivante ("Alive") (2002) – Claire
- "Algérie des chimères, L'" (2001) (mini) TV Series – Jeanne 20 ans
- Bella ciao (2001) – Bianca
- Fantômes de Louba, Les (2001) – Jeannie as a teenager
- Libertin, Le ("The Libertine") (2000) – Angélique Diderot
- Pas de scandale ("Keep It Quiet" / "No Scandal") (1999) – Stéphanie
- Stolen Life (1998) – Sigga
- Marie Baie des Anges ("Angel Sharks" / "Marie from the Bay of Angels") (1997) – Marie
