= The Blonde with Bare Breasts =

- Film poster
- Directed by: Manuel Pradal
- Written by: Manuel Pradal
- Produced by: Alain Goldman
- Starring: Nicolas Duvauchelle; Vahina Giocante
- Cinematography: Hugues Espinasse
- Edited by: Beatrice Herminie
- Music by: Carlo Crivelli
- Production company: Légende Films
- Distributed by: Eurozoom
- Release date: 16 January 2010
- Running time: 100 minutes
- Country: France
- Language: French
- Box office: $64,561

The Blonde with Bare Breasts (French: La blonde aux seins nus) is a 2010 French film written and directed by Manuel Pradal.

== Plot ==
Julien (Nicolas Duvauchelle), 25 years old, and Louis (Steve le Roi), 14 years old, are brothers. Their father had often beaten Julien, who defended Louis from also being beaten, but their father has become terminally ill. Although the brothers do not care much for it, they try to obtain ownership of their father's river transport narrowboat.

A gang offers money for stealing the Édouard Manet painting La blonde aux seins nus (The Blonde with Bare Breasts) from a museum. Louis steals the painting while the young guard Rosalie (Vahina Giocante) is distracted. Rosalie chases him, but Louis manages to lock her up aboard the riverboat. Later, the brothers free her to move around on the boat. Although she is sometimes treated rudely, she decides she likes the adventure. The police suspect her of being involved in the theft. She ends up helping the brothers when the ship is searched, by hiding herself and the painting.

Julien and Rosalie eventually have sex. Louis hears them and is jealous; he makes a life-size dummy of his clothes and uses it to pretend to have hanged himself. Julien plans to kill Rosalie, because she knows they stole the painting. Louis tries to protect her by advising her to escape. She returns the painting to her father, who arranges its restoration. In an act of revenge, the gang that wanted to buy it beats up Julien. Rosalie reunites with the brothers on the ship. Following the death of the father, Louis gets the boat. He apparently is the father's only real son.

== Cast ==
- Nicolas Duvauchelle as Julien
- Vahina Giocante as Rosalie
- Tomasz Kowalski as Polonais
- Steve Le Roi as Louis

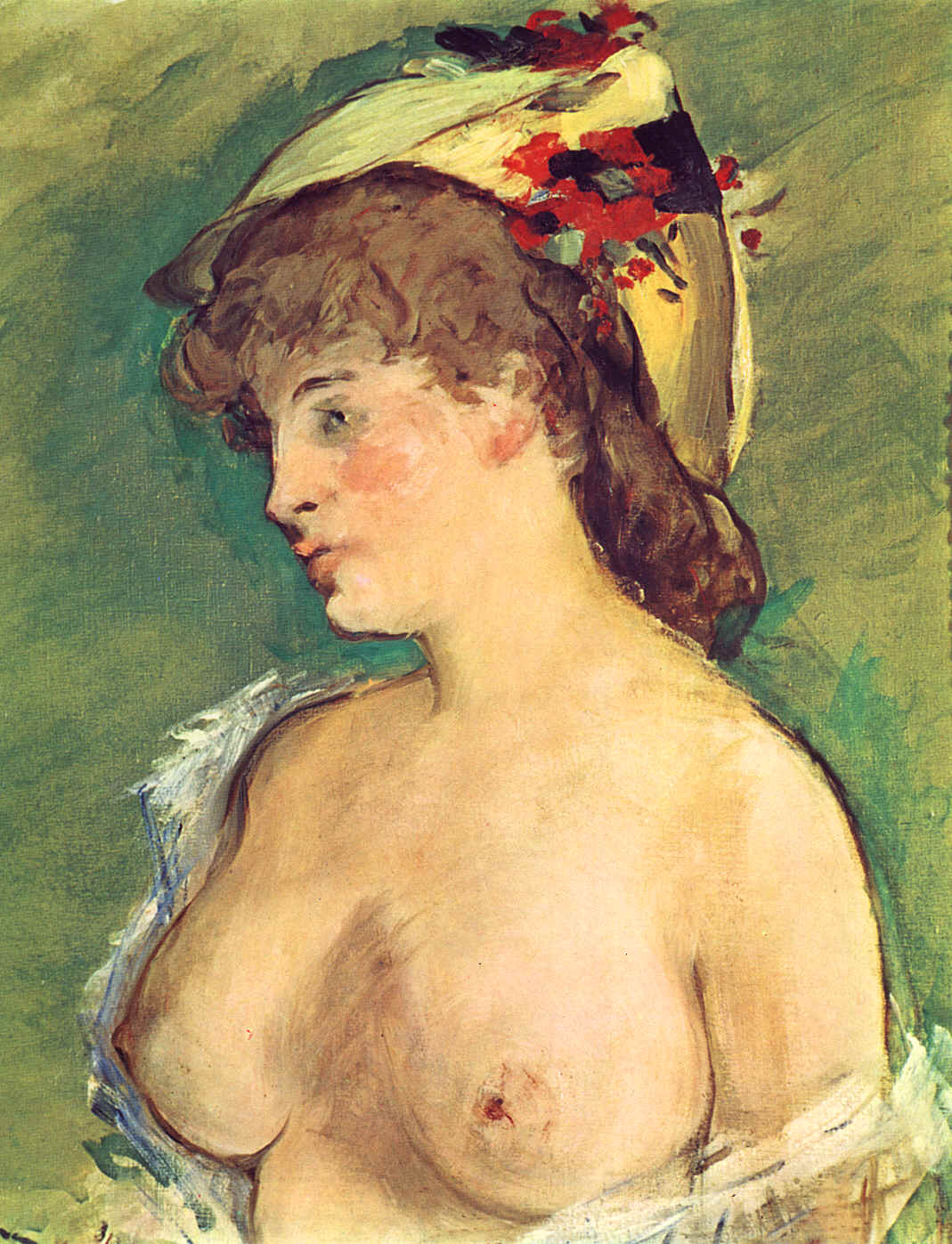
Édouard Manet – La blonde aux seins nus

== Production ==
Filming began on 29 July 2008 for a 9-week period near Paris and the Seine, and by spring 2009 was completed.

== Release ==
The film was released in France on 16 January 2010, and was screened at film festivals including Le Festival du Film de Cabourg and Cannes. The film had its world premiere in June 2010 in the Netherlands under the French title.

== Reception ==
Of the film's world premiere in the Netherlands, André Waardenburg of NRC Handelsblad wrote "Nederland heeft de wereldpremière. Een dubieuze eer, want de film is niet erg sterk." (The Netherlands has the world premiere. A dubious honor, as the film is not very strong.) He expanded on his review by writing "Net zoals het schilderij heeft de film weinig inhoud. Het probeert van de hoofdpersonages sympathieke schelmen te maken die lak hebben aan het establishment. Dat lukt maar half." (Like the painting, the film has little content. It attempts to make the main characters likeable rogues who have disdain for the establishment. That only half succeeds.) However, he did approve of the locations. He wrote, "De locaties maken een beetje goed: het bezoek aan het schilderachtige plaatsje dat nog de sfeer van de Impressionisten ademt, levert een paar aardige scènes op." (The locations make up for that somewhat; the visit to the picturesque village that still breathes the atmosphere of the Impressionists delivers a few nice scenes.)

Jordan Mintzer of Variety wrote, "Despite what some may consider a promising title, there's unfortunately little to show for it in The Blonde With Bare Breasts" calling Manuel Pradal's film an "aimless intrigue". Referring to Pradal's earlier films, he wrote the film was "clearly a case of style over substance", and offered that the substance of the film was "so ephemeral and misconstrued" that it detracted from Yorgos Arvanitis' otherwise superb location cinematography.
