= Maï Anh Le =

French actress

Maï Anh Le is a French actress of Vietnamese origin. She studied economics and management, while supporting herself by working as a model. She began her acting career in 2002 with the role of Akemi in Giodano Gederlini's feature film Samourais. In 2003, she acted with Sandrine Bonnaire in the TV series La Maison des Enfants. She also starred in 2004 Jean-Jacques Annaud film Two Brothers.

== Selected filmography ==
- 3 Days to Kill ... Agent Yasmin
- 2013 Win Win ... Secrétaire de Chang
- 2011 Une famille formidable (TV Series)... Mai Lin
- 2011 Tous en scène ... Mai Lin
- 2011 Vive la crise ... Mai Lin
- 2010-2011 Affaires étrangères (TV series) ... Tuo Ma / Xang Hue
- 2011 Cambodge ... Tuo Ma
- 2010 République dominicaine ... Xang Hue
- 2009 La taupe 2 (TV movie) ... Cindy Jong
- 2008 Duval and Moretti (TV series)
- 2008 La nouvelle coéquipière
- 2008 Dead Cell (short) ... the woman
- 2008 Écrire pour un chanteur (TV series) ... la femme d'en face
- 2008 Chang Juan (2008) ... la femme d'en face
- 2008 Modern Love ... Kim
- 2007 L'histoire de Richard O. ... la Vietnamienne hystérique
- 2006 R.I.S. Police scientifique (TV series) ... Serveuse Shangai club
- 2006 Belle de nuit (2006) ... Serveuse Shangai club
- 2005 L'empire du tigre (TV movie) ... Sao
- 2004 Poids léger ... Su
- 2004 Two Brothers ... Naï-Rea
- 2004 La légion étrange (short) ... Emma
- 2004 Le 10eme jour (short) ... Manon / Phoebe
- 2003 La maison des enfants (TV series) ... Maï
- 2002 Samourais ... Akemi
