= Marie from the Bay of Angels =

- Directed by: Manuel Pradal
- Screenplay by: Manuel Pradal
- Produced by: Philippe Rousselet
- Starring: Vahina Giocante; Frédéric Malgras
- Cinematography: Christophe Pollock
- Edited by: Valérie Deseine
- Music by: Carlo Crivelli
- Production companies: La Sept Cinéma; Lelia Films; Les Films de la Suane; Les Films des Tournelles; Studio Images 2
- Distributed by: Pyramide Distribution
- Release date: 1997
- Running time: 90 minutes
- Country: France
- Language: French

Marie from the Bay of Angels (French: Marie Baie des Anges), also known as Angel Sharks, is a 1997 French movie, written and directed by Manuel Pradal.

== Cast ==
- Vahina Giocante as Marie
- Frédéric Malgras as Orso
- Nicolas Welbers as Goran
- Amira Casar as The Girl In The Villa
- Swan Carpio as Jurec
- Jamie Harris as Jimmy
- Andrew Clover as Andy
- Roxane Mesquida as Mireille
- Aurelie Morardet as Corinne
- John Dowling as John
- Patrick Serray as Bob
- Brigitte Roüan as Paule

== Music ==
The film's score was composed by Carlo Crivelli. Its soundtrack included songs by J J Cale, Beth Hirsch's "I Could Love You Too", and "Oba, La Vem Ela" by Jorge Ben.

== Reception ==
Roger Ebert of the Chicago Sun-Times gave the film 1 out of 4. Ebert was critical of the leading lady "Giocante has been billed as "the new Bardot," and she's off to a good start: Bardot didn't make many good films, either." Ebert was unimpressed by the "recycling exhausted cliches" and found the non-sequential storytelling exhausting, but gave some praise for the scenery, compositions, and "pretty pictures". He concludes "Giocante and Malgras are superficially attractive, although because their characters are empty vessels there's no reason to like them much, or care about them. The movie is cast as a tragedy, and it's tragic, all right: tragic that these kids never developed intelligence and personalities."

=== Accolades ===
The film was in competition for the Tiger Award at the 1998 International Film Festival Rotterdam (IFFR).
