= Stéfi Celma =

French actress and singer

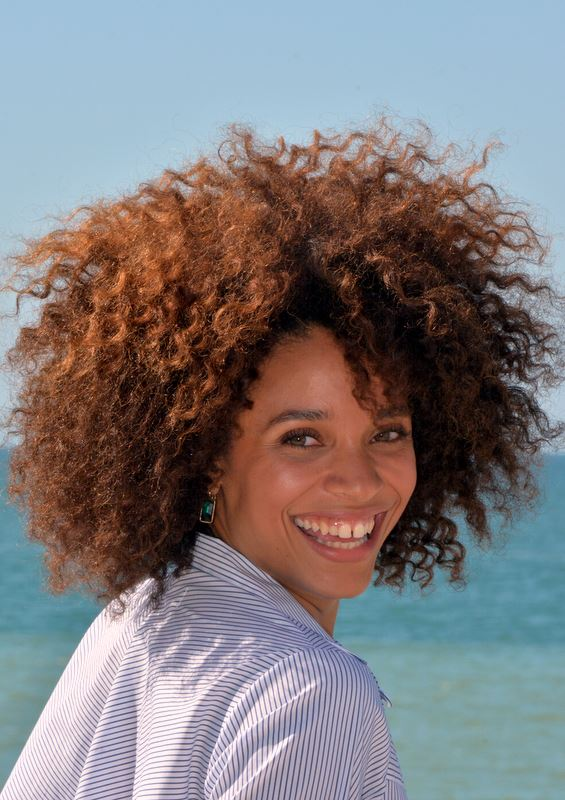
- Stéfi Celma at the 2017 Cabourg Film Festival
- Born: 9 October 1986 (age 39); Paris
- Occupations: Actress, singer
- Years active: 2006–present

Stefi Celma (born 9 October 1986) is a French actress and singer.

== Biography ==
Stefi Celma was born in Paris to Martinican parents.

When Celma was 4 years old, she took part in the TV show L'École des fans. A few years after, she joined the French Conservatory where she started to learn music, how to play piano, to dance and sing.

In 2005, Celma took part in the musical Sol En Cirque, written by Zazie. Then she joined the team of the live show jukebox musical Je m'voyais déjà, written by Laurent Ruquier, with Charles Aznavour's songs.

Celma has appeared in different television shows, Le Frère que je n'ai pas eu, Un Flic: Calibre Caraïbe, Trop jeune pour Toi or La Maison des Rocheville.

Celma's first two film features were Pas très normales Activités directed by Maurice Barthélemy and Les Profs directed by Pierre François Martin Laval. next steps on the big screen were in Les Profs 2 and Antigang.

Celma is best known as Sofia in Dix pour cent (English title: Call My Agent!), produced by France Télévisions.

== Filmography ==
Year	Title	Role	Director	Notes
2009	Joséphine, ange gardien	Teresa	Pascal Heylbroeck	TV series (1 episode)
2009	Seconde chance	Alexia / Alexandra	Jérôme Enrico, Vincent Giovanni, ...	TV series (10 episodes)
2010	Boulevard du Palais	Cyrielle	Thierry Petit	TV series (1 episode)
2010	Un flic	Brenda	Patrick Dewolf	TV series (1 episode)
2010	La maison des Rocheville	Clara	Jacques Otmezguine	TV series (1 episode)
2011	Case départ	Rosalie	Lionel Steketee, Fabrice Eboué & Thomas N'Gijol	
2013	Serial Teachers	Amina	Pierre-François Martin-Laval	
2013	Pas très normales activités	Karine Leleu	Maurice Barthélémy	
2015	The Squad	Ricci	Benjamin Rocher	
2015	Serial Teachers 2	Amina	Pierre-François Martin-Laval (2)	
2015–2020	Call My Agent! (Dix pour cent)	Sofia Leprince	Lola Doillon, Cédric Klapisch, ...	TV series (24 episodes)
2016	Du Vent dans les Branches de Sassafras	Miriam	Emmanuel Murat	TV movie
2017	Baby Bump(S)	Charlotte	Noémie Saglio	
2018	In Safe Hands	Elodie	Jeanne Herry	
2020	Lost Bullet	Julia	Guillaume Pierret	Netflix movie
2020	Miss	Miss PACA	Ruben Alves	
2022	Sopravvissuti	Sylvie	Carmine Elia	TV series (12 episodes)
2022	Lost Bullet 2	Julia	Guillaume Pierret	Netflix movie
2025	Asterix and Obelix: The Big Fight	Annabarbera (voice)	Alain Chabat	Netflix animated mini-series

== Musicals ==
- 2007: Sol en cirque, écrit par Zazie
- 2008 : Je m'voyais déjà, Virginie

== Theater ==
Year	Title	Author	Director	Notes
2013	À la française	Édouard Baer	Édouard Baer	
2016	Du vent dans les branches de Sassafras	René de Obaldia	Bernard Murat	Théâtre Édouard VII

== Discography ==
- 2006 : Avec les anges (CD single en hommage aux victimes martiniquaises de la catastrophe aérienne du 16 août 2005 au Venezuela)
