= Kheiron =

Iranian-born French actor (born 1982)

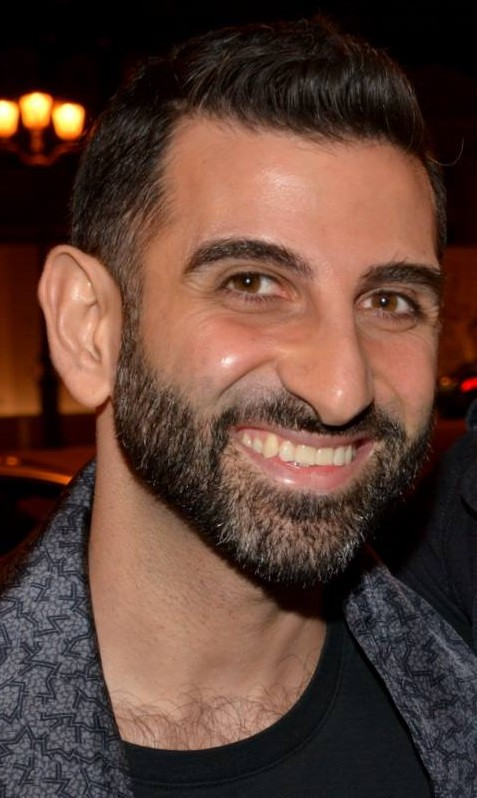
- Born: Manouchehr Tabib; 21 November 1982 (age 43); Tehran, Iran
- Other name: Manouchehr "Nouchi" Tabib
- Occupations: Actor; Film director
- Years active: 2011–present

Manouchehr Tabib (born November 21, 1982), known professionally as Kheiron, is an Iranian-born French comedian, actor and film director. Internationally, he is best known as the director and star of the 2015 comedy-drama film All Three of Us, which was nominated for the César Award for Best First Feature Film. His subsequent film Bad Seeds (French title: Mauvaises Herbes) was released in English-speaking countries through Netflix.

== Filmography ==
=== Actor ===
Year	Title	Role	Director	Notes
2011-12	Bref	Kheiron	Kyan Khojandi & Bruno Muschio	TV series (13 episodes)
2013	Les gamins	Reza Sadeqi	Anthony Marciano	
2014	L'Ecole des Commentaires	Jean-Eudes Martin	Théodore Bonnet	Short
2015	All Three of Us	Hibat Tabib	Kheiron	
2018	Bad Seeds	Waël	Kheiron	
2020	Brutus vs César	Brutus	Kheiron	
2025	Bref.2	Kheiron	Kyan Khojandi & Bruno Muschio	TV series (1 episode)

=== Filmmaker ===
Year	Title	Notes
2015	All Three of Us	Munich Film Festival - Bayern 2 and SZ Audience Award; Tokyo International Film Festival - Special Jury Prize; Nominated - César Award for Best First Feature Film; Nominated - Tokyo International Film Festival - Tokyo Grand Prix
2018	Mauvaises herbes	
2020	Brutus vs César	
