= Pascale Arbillot =

French actress

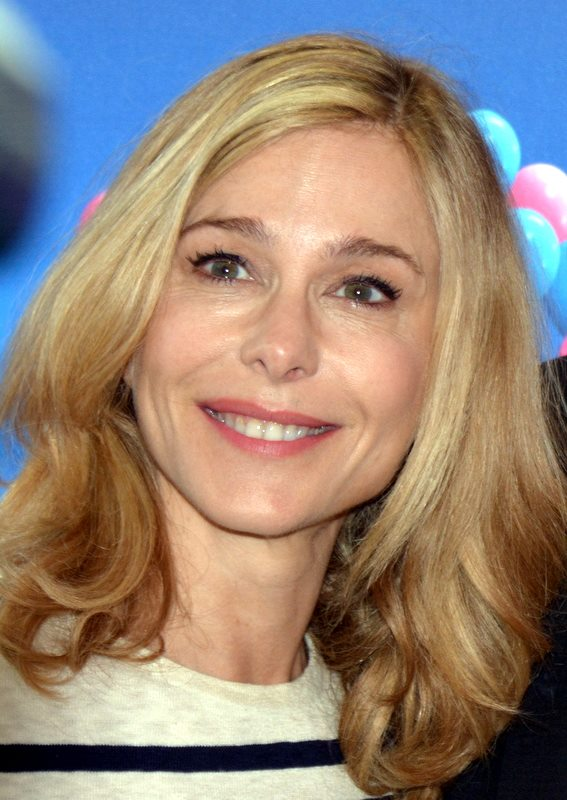
- Pascale Arbillot in 2014
- Born: 17 April 1970 (age 56)
- Occupation: Actress
- Years active: 1993 - present
- Children: 1

Pascale Arbillot (French: [paskal aʁbijo]; born 17 April 1970) is a French actress. She is a graduate of the Paris Institute of Political Sciences; however, soon after, she decided to become an actress. She has appeared in films, on television and in the theatre.

== Filmography ==
Year	Title	Role	Director	Notes
1993	Le miel et les abeilles	The lawyer	Christophe Gregeois	TV series (1 episode)
1994	L'affaire	The secretary	Sergio Gobbi	
1994	Le cri coupé	Thérèse Troppmann	Miguel Courtois	TV movie
1994	La rêverie ou le mariage de Sylvia	Emilie	Jean-Luc Trotignon	TV movie
1995	Lettre ouverte à Lili	Employee taxes	Jean-Luc Trotignon	TV movie
1995	Nestor Burma	Lorraine	Daniel Losset	TV series (1 episode)
1995	Julie Lescaut	Martine	Élisabeth Rappeneau & Marion Sarraut	TV series (2 episodes)
1995-97	Les Cordier, juge et flic	Hannah / Sonia	Jacques Cortal & Marion Sarraut	TV series (2 episodes)
1996	L'homme idéal	The woman	François Ozon	Short
1997	Mon jour de chance	The woman	Pascale Pouzadoux	Short
1997	Les voisins	Madame Mercier	Artus de Penguern	Short
1997	Rien que des grandes personnes		Jean-Marc Brondolo	Short
1997	Féminin masculine	Delphine	Michaëla Watteaux	TV movie
1997	Salut l'angoisse	Laura	Maurice Frydland	TV movie
1997	Bonne fête papa	Lucy	Didier Fontan	TV movie
1997	Navarro	Anne-Lise Bellec	José Pinheiro	TV series (1 episode)
1998	Double jeu	Rosa	Emmanuel Oberg	Short
1998	La polyclinique de l'amour	Priscilla	Artus de Penguern	Short
1998	Une grosse bouchée d'amour	Agnès	Michaëla Watteaux	TV movie
1998	Vertiges	Jeanne	Eric Woreth	TV series (1 episode)
1998-2003	Crimes en série	Maud Berthier	Patrick Dewolf, Pascal Légitimus, ...	TV series (10 episodes)
1999	One 4 All	The businesswoman	Claude Lelouch	
1999	Le sourire du clown	Hélène	Éric Besnard	
1999	Si les poules avaient des dents	The farmer	Pierre Dugowson	Short
1999	Quand fond la neige où va le blanc?	The woman	Jean-Michel Aubret	Short
2000	L'extraterrestre	Agathe	Didier Bourdon	
2001	Gregoire Moulin vs. Humanity	Odile Bonheur	Artus de Penguern	
2001	La tortue	Valérie Gaspari	Dominique Baron	TV movie
2001	Les ex font la loi	Clémence	Philippe Triboit	TV movie
2001	Juliette: Service(s) compris	Mathilde	Jérôme Foulon	TV movie
2001	Docteur Sylvestre	Charlotte	Marion Sarraut	TV series (1 episode)
2002	Plus haut	Claire	Nicolas Brevière	
2002	Le grand soir	Hélène Raymond	Stéphane Brisset	Short
2002	Vu à la télé	Cécile	Daniel Losset	TV movie
2003	Toutes les filles sont folles	The judge	Pascale Pouzadoux	
2003	Changer tout	Florence	Élisabeth Rappeneau	TV movie
2003	Une amie en or	Julie Ferenzi	Eric Woreth	TV movie
2003	Mon voisin du dessus	Odile	Laurence Katrian	TV movie
2003	La maîtresse du corroyeur	Simone Porquel	Claude Grinberg	TV movie
2003	Mata Hari, la vraie histoire	France Bouchardon	Alain Tasma	TV movie
2004	Clara et moi	Isabelle	Arnaud Viard	
2004	(Mon) Jour de chance		Nicolas Brevière	Short
2004	Les robinsonnes	Nadia	Laurent Dussaux	TV movie
2004	Caution personnelle	Solange	Serge Meynard	TV movie
2004	La tresse d'Aminata	Gaëlle	Dominique Baron	TV movie
2004	Maigret	Gisèle Marton	Pierre Joassin	TV series (1 episode)
2004	La crim'	Mélanie	Dominique Guillo	TV series (1 episode)
2005	Edy	Catherine	Stéphan Guérin-Tillié	
2005	Espace détente	Véro Convenant	Yvan Le Bolloc'h & Bruno Solo	
2005	Les couilles de mon chat	Marie	Didier Bénureau	Short
2005-08	Merci, les enfants vont bien !	Isabelle	Stéphane Clavier	TV series (12 episodes)
2006	Hell	The gynecologist	Bruno Chiche	
2006	Un printemps à Paris	Louise	Jacques Bral	
2006	Une histoire de pieds	Judith	Stéphane & David Foenkinos	Short
2006	Mer belle à agitée	Sabine Bertignac	Pascal Chaumeil	TV movie
2007	Cut !	The woman	Alain Riou	Short
2008	Notre univers impitoyable	Juliette	Léa Fazer	Alpe d'Huez International Comedy Film Festival - Best Acting
2008	Let's Talk About the Rain	Florence	Agnès Jaoui	Prix Raimu - Best Supporting Actress
2009	Coco	Agathe	Gad Elmaleh	
2009	Divorces !	Valentine	Valérie Guignabodet	
2010	Little White Lies	Isabelle Ribaud	Guillaume Canet	
2010	Small World	Doctor Wirth	Bruno Chiche	
2010	Les meilleurs amis du monde	Lucie	Julien Rambaldi	
2010	Un soupçon d'innocence	Marie	Olivier Péray	TV movie Festival de la fiction TV de La Rochelle - Best Actress
2011	The Art of Love	Zoé	Emmanuel Mouret	
2011	All Our Desires	Marthe	Philippe Lioret	
2011	Une pure affaire	Christine Pelame	Alexandre Coffre	Alpe d'Huez International Comedy Film Festival - Best Acting
2012	Bankable	Barbara Deville	Mona Achache	TV movie Luchon International Film Festival - Best Actress
2012	Les pirogues des hautes terres	Yvonne Hauterive	Olivier Langlois	TV movie
2013	Des frères et des soeurs	Adèle	Anne Giafferi	TV movie
2014	Gemma Bovery	The new neighbor	Anne Fontaine	
2014	Papa Was Not a Rolling Stone	The counselor	Sylvie Ohayon	
2014	Palais de justesse	The assessor	Stéphane De Groodt	Short
2014	La vie à l'envers	Odile	Anne Giafferi	TV movie
2014	Resistance	Victoria	Miguel Courtois & David Delrieux	TV mini-series
2015	French Cuisine	Charlotte	Florent Emilio Siri	
2015	Stunned	Madame Coppi	Gérard Pautonnier	Short
2015	Marjorie	Louise	Mona Achache	TV series (1 episode)
2016	La folle histoire de Max et Léon	The actress	Jonathan Barré	
2016	Juillet août	Anne Bruant	Diastème	
2016	Accusé	Danielle	Mona Achache	TV series (1 episode)
2017	I Got Life!	Mano	Blandine Lenoir	
2017	Maryline	Betty Brant	Guillaume Gallienne	
2017	Momo	Sarah	Vincent Lobelle & Sébastien Thiery	
2017	Heurts	Lisa	Sophie Guillemin	Short
2017	Le ticket	Agnès	Ali Marhyar	Short
2017	Jusqu'à écoulement des stocks		Pierre Dugowson	Short
2018	Guy	Sophie Ravel	Alex Lutz	
2018	La Fête des mères	Isabelle	Marie-Castille Mention-Schaar	
2018	Pauvre Georges !	Lila Maurin	Claire Devers	
2018	Genius	Emilie-Marguerite Walter	Mathias Herndl	TV series (1 episode)
2019	Nous finirons ensemble	Isabelle	Guillaume Canet	
2019	Miss	Amanda	Ruben Alves	
2019	Mon chien stupide		Yvan Attal	
2019	Le meilleur reste à venir		Alexandre de La Patellière & Matthieu Delaporte	
2020	Lost Bullet	Moss	Guillaume Pierret	
2020	Mon Cousin		Jan Kounen	
2022	Lost Bullet 2	Moss	Guillaume Pierret	
2025	Lost Bullet 3	Moss	Guillaume Pierret	

== Theater ==
Year	Title	Author	Director
1993	La Mamma	Jacqueline Bœuf	Jacqueline Bœuf
1993	La Paire de gifle	Yves Lecat	Yves Lecat
1994	La Nuit du crime	Steve Pasteur	Robert Hossein
2000	Leçon de nuit	Vivant Denon	Christophe Lidon
2003	Hedda Gabler	Henrik Ibsen	Roman Polanski
2004	Le Prince travesti	Pierre de Marivaux	Nicolas Briançon
2006	Adultères	Woody Allen	Benoît Lavigne
2011	L’Amour, la mort, les fringues	Nora & Delia Ephron	Danièle Thompson
2011-13	Quadrille	Sacha Guitry	Bernard Murat
2014	Chambre froide	Michele Lowe	Sally Micaleff
2014	Un temps de chien	Brigitte Buc	Jean Bouchaud
2015-16	Un amour qui ne finit pas	André Roussin	Michel Fau

== Personal life ==
She was in a couple with the actor Artus de Penguern from 1996 to 2004. From 2005 to 2010, She was in a relationship with Bruno Chiche, they had a son together, Léonard, born in 2005.
