= Lost Bullet 2 =

2022 French action film

- Promotional release poster
- French: Balle perdue 2
- Directed by: Guillaume Pierret
- Produced by: Guillaume Pierret; Alban Lenoir
- Cinematography: Morgan S. Dalibert
- Music by: Romain Trouillet
- Production companies: Inoxy Films; Nolita TV; Versus Production
- Distributed by: Netflix
- Release date: 11 November 2022
- Running time: 100 minutes
- Country: France
- Language: French (Note: With some dialogue in Spanish)

Lost Bullet 2 (French: Balle perdue 2) is a 2022 French action film directed by Guillaume Pierret. It is second installment in the Lost Bullet film series, and is a sequel to Lost Bullet, which came out in 2020 on Netflix.

== Plot ==
Six months since the death of Charas, Lino works in the drug crime squad now led by Julia. But he is always on the search for the killers of his mentor, Charas, and brother, Quentin. He stakes out the home of Stella, the wife of Charas' murderer, Areski, each night, but Areski never returns. His police colleagues urge him to give up his quest, stop living in his car, and move on. Julia gives him a set of Renault keys. He discovers they are for Charas' 1990s 2 litre turbo, which was wrecked in the last film and was stored at the police garage. Lino restores it, painting it blue and equipping it with a huge battery to electrify a front ram which is used to stop cars carrying drugs.

A year later, Lino is again leading police raids on drug importers in modified police vehicles. Out on a job, he meets Spanish police officer Alvaro across the border with Spain, who reveals himself to have been be a friend of Charas. Lino is now in a relationship with Stella, but Julia is regretful of the end of their previous relationship. He arrives at a secret country location after a fake phone call about the poor health of his foster mother there (sent by a drug lord wanting Marco dead), but finds Marco, Areski's henchman, is being held there. His police colleagues had concealed that Marco was under their protection as part of their struggle with drug runners. Rather than killing Marco as the drug lord hoped, Lino fights off numerous police before driving Marco to Spain in the Renault, where the police eagerly await his capture to also face justice there.

A very long car chase sequence results, involving good and bad police (all after Lino and Marco), drug runners, car swaps, explosions, border checkpoints, and deaths. The Renault is also destroyed in a chase with Julia. Alvaro and his team appear, involved in trying and failing to get Marco into Spain, also saving Lino's life. Marco, a key witness, is accidentally killed across the Spanish border in a tussle by Julia, thus ruining the case against numerous drug runners and corrupt police. The new threat is the corrupt head of the Narcotics Department of Police, Alexander Resz, who send numerous police after Lino on the way to Spain. Lino tries to take the blame for Julia by incriminating himself. Julia quits the force when her boss, Moss, wants her to say in court that Lino killed Marco, to thereby sweep the death and her own mistake under the carpet. Areski reappears in a final sequence looking for the latest remains of the Renault, removing Charas' crucifix.

== Cast ==
- Alban Lenoir as Lino
- Stéfi Celma as Julia
- Pascale Arbillot as Moss
- Sébastien Lalanne as Marco
- Diego Martín as Alvaro
- Jérôme Niel as Yann
- Khalissa Houicha as Victoria
- Quentin d'Hainaut as Yuri
- Anne Serra as Stella (Areski's wife)
- Thibaut Evrard as Lieutenant Bruno
- Nicolas Duvauchelle as Areski

== Production ==
In March 2021, this sequel to Lost Bullet was announced on Netflix.

Filming took place in October 2021 at Agde in Hérault, France and across the Occitanie region. A canal scene was shot in Montpellier and others at Saint-Affrique - Belmont airport.

== Reception ==
=== Critical response ===
On Rotten Tomatoes the film has an approval rating of 86% based on reviews from 6 critics. Critics praised the slightly better character development than in the first film, and the "impressive stuntwork", a feature of a larger budget for action sequences and car chases.

== Sequel ==
At the end of the filming, a third film in the series was announced. It was released on May 7, 2025.
