= Manuel Pradal =

French film director and screenwriter

- Born: 22 March 1964; Aubenas, Ardèche, France
- Died: 13 May 2017 (aged 53); Paris, France
- Occupation(s): Film director, screenwriter

Manuel Pradal (22 March 1964 – 13 May 2017) was a French film director and screenwriter. He wrote the scenarios for all the films he directed. Pradal died on 13 May 2017 in Paris after a long illness, aged 53.

He studied in the directing department of La Fémis, from which she was graduated in 1990.

== Awards and nominations ==
His 1997 film Marie from the Bay of Angels was in competition for the Tiger Award at the 1998 International Film Festival Rotterdam (IFFR).

== Filmography ==
Manuel Pradal is both the screenwriter and the director of all of his films.

- 1991: Canti
- 1997: Marie from the Bay of Angels (a.k.a. Angel Sharks)
- 2002: Ginostra
- 2006: A Crime
- 2010: The Blonde with Bare Breasts
- 2013: Tom le cancre
- 2014: Benoît Brisefer: Les Taxis rouges
