= Robin des bois, la véritable histoire =

- Film poster
- Directed by: Anthony Marciano
- Produced by: Alain Goldman
- Distributed by: Mars Distribution
- Release date: 15 April 2015
- Running time: 87 minutes
- Country: France
- Language: French
- Budget: $11.1 million
- Box office: $7.2 million

Robin des bois, la véritable histoire (English: Robin Hood, the true story) is a 2015 French comedy film.

== Plot ==
Robin Hood is a seedy crook. He and his accomplice Tuck rob the poor, women, the elderly, the blind, and the disabled. The rest? Too risky. But even the bad guys have dreams and theirs is to buy the most popular brothel in the city, the Pussycat. Robin, who stops at nothing when it comes to getting rich, then decides to get the money to realize this dream by robbing the Nottingham tax office. But his meeting with a Sherwood gang of vigilantes, who rob the rich to give to the poor, will thwart his plans. Little John, Marianne and their friends have in fact had exactly the same idea as him to rob the Sheriff of Nottingham. The – true – story of Robin Hood can finally begin!

== Cast ==
- Max Boublil: Robin des Bois (Robin Hood)
- Gérard Darmon: The Sheriff of Nottingham
- Ary Abittan: Petit Jean (Little John)
- Patrick Timsit: Alfred
- Malik Bentalha: Frère Tuck (Friar Tuck)
- Géraldine Nakache: Marianne (Maid Marian)
- Jaouen Gouévic: Raoul
- Benjamin Blanchy: l'employé de Robin
- Antoine Khorsand: Petit Prince
- Éric et Quentin: Gaston et Firmin
- M. Pokora: Robin des Bois (Caméo)
- István Szilágyi - city dweller
- Zoltán Zana aka Ganxta Zolee - one of the outlaws who wants to rob Marianne
- András Várkonyi - innkeeper
- Zoltán Karácsonyi – brother of Marianne, a member of the Sherwood gang
- Attila Táborosi - a member of the Sherwood gang
- György Genersich - a member of the Sherwood gang
- Liliána Kovács - a member of the Sherwood gang
- Sándor Kárpáti - a member of the Sherwood gang
- György Bresztyenszky - a member of the Sherwood gang
- Imre Csuja – The King

== Reception ==
In France, the film received generally negative reviews. It achieves a score of 1.9 / 5 on AlloCiné.

== Interesting facts ==
- The interior scenes of Nottingham Castle were recorded in the film studio in Fót.
- The village of the Sherwood gang was in the forest near Göböljárás in Fejér County. The same scenery village also appears in the second part of the first season of the series titled The Last Kingdom.
- The scene when the outlaws attack Mariann and then Little John takes Robin Hood to the village was shot in the Dobogókő forest.
