= All Three of Us =

2015 film directed by Kheiron

- Theatrical release poster
- Directed by: Kheiron
- Written by: Kheiron
- Produced by: Simon Istolainen; Benjamin Drouin
- Starring: Kheiron; Leïla Bekhti; Gérard Darmon; Zabou Breitman
- Cinematography: Jean-François Hensgens
- Edited by: Anny Danché
- Production companies: Adama Pictures; Gaumont; M6 Films
- Distributed by: Gaumont Distribution
- Release dates: 22 October 2015 (Tokyo); 4 November 2015 (France)
- Running time: 102 minutes
- Country: France
- Language: French
- Budget: $8.4 million
- Box office: $4 million

All Three of Us (original title: Nous trois ou rien; also known as The Three of Us) is a 2015 French biographical comedy-drama film written, directed by and starring Kheiron in his directorial debut. The film also stars Leïla Bekhti, Gérard Darmon and Zabou Breitman. It was screened at the Tokyo International Film Festival where it won the Special Jury Prize. The film was nominated for the César Award for Best First Feature Film at the 41st César Awards.

== Synopsis ==
Kheiron plays the role of his father, Hibat Tabib, born in Iran, convicted for his political opinions under the Shah. Continuing to fight for democracy with his young wife Fereshteh under the new repressive Iranian regime of the Ayatollah Khomeini, they are finally forced to leave their country for security reasons, taking their son Manouchehr to live in France.

== Cast ==
- Kheiron: Hibat Tabib
- Leïla Bekhti: Fereshteh Tabib
- Gérard Darmon: Fereshteh's father
- Zabou Breitman: Fereshteh's mother
- Alexandre Astier: the Shah of Iran
- Kyan Khojandi: "Beard"
- Michel Vuillermoz: Daniel Bioton
- Jonathan Cohen: Chokri
- Ériq Ebouaney: Adama
- Carole Franck: Catherine Hanriot
- Camélia Jordana: Maryam
- Arsène Mosca: Head guard
- David Serero: Iranian agent
