= AKA (2023 film) =

2023 French film by Morgan S. Dalibert

- Directed by: Morgan S. Dalibert
- Written by: Morgan S. Dalibert; Alban Lenoir
- Starring: Alban Lenoir; Eric Cantona; Thibault de Montalembert
- Cinematography: Florent Astolfi
- Edited by: Tianès Montasser
- Music by: Etienne Forget
- Distributed by: Netflix
- Release date: April 28, 2023
- Running time: 122 minutes
- Country: France
- Language: French

AKA is a 2023 French action crime film directed by Morgan S. Dalibert, written by Morgan S. Dalibert and Alban Lenoir and starring Lenoir, Eric Cantona and Thibault de Montalembert. It is about an undercover agent (played by Lenoir) tasked with infiltrating a crime gang that is connected to a Sudanese terrorist bombing suspect.

== Plot ==
Adam Franco is an Action Division operative and former Legionnaire working for a French Intelligence official known as Kruger. After infiltrating a terrorist cell in Libya to take out a captured reporter, Franco is assigned a new task by Kruger under the direction of the high-ranking Senator Marconnet -- flush out and eliminate a South Sudanese warlord, Moktar Al Tayeb, who is the prime suspect of a bombing in a Paris hotel.

To get closer to his target, he infiltrates the Pastore crime syndicate and earns the trust of the gangster boss, Victor Pastore. Victor has known business connections to Al Tayeb. Adam impresses Victor by demonstrating his physical capabilities during altercations with a rival gang, led by an Egyptian gang leader, Amet. Adam also develops a friendship with fellow gangster Pee Wee, who is believed to be connected to Al Tayeb. While working for Victor, Adam also unexpectedly bonds with Victor's step-son, Jonathan.

During a birthday party for Jonathan, Adam is called away by Pee Wee to join a bank heist requested by Victor, making him unable to drive Jonathan to a day at the zoo. During their getaway drive, they are ambushed by Amet's gang, resulting in a firefight in the streets. After the shoot-out, Victor is furious, realising that there is a mole in his operation. Adam discovers it is Natalya, Victor's wife, and warns her that she will soon be discovered.

While out at the zoo with his older teenage sister Hélène, Jonathan is kidnapped by Amet's gangsters. Victor is furious and Natalya begs for him to pay the ransom fee, but he declines. Meanwhile, Adam follows Pee Wee, while assisted by fellow agent, Cisko, to a safe-house that might have Al Tayeb. In the middle of that stake-out, Adam is informed about the kidnapping. He leaves to infiltrate Amet's gang compound. After fighting his way through the compound, Adam saves Jonathan and kills Amet, but is badly wounded.

While Adam is away, Cisko spots Al Tayeb and confronts him, only to be killed by Pee Wee. Later, after realizing Cisko has not been responding to his calls and finding his car abandoned, Adam breaks into a shop nearby to view security footage of Cisko's murder. Notified by the shop security alarm, police arrive to arrest him, but Adam explains that he is undercover and provides his badge number. The scene is observed by Youssef, one of Victor's lieutenants, who realizes that Adam is a mole. Youssef gathers some of Victor's men to ambush Adam while he is recuperating at his apartment. Youssef's call to his team is intercepted by Mona, Cisko's partner in the surveillance of Adam. She takes out Victor's men, alerting Adam in the process, but ultimate succumbs to a shotgun blast that clipped her neck.

Adam decides to go and finish his mission, finding Pee Wee and Al Tayeb in a makeshift hospital. Al Tayeb reveals that he has been framed by the French government--he was invited to France under pretense of discussing Sudanese politics but was the victim of an assassination attempt. It killed his wife and grievously injured his daughter. He was attacked because of past connections with Senator Marconnet, which the senator wants to keep hidden. Al Tayeb has been gathering funds (hence the bank heist) for the medical treatment of his daughter, whilst the government has branded him a terrorist.

Meanwhile, Kruger wants to clean up and has sent two units of elite commandos to kill Al Tayeb, Victor, and everyone connected to the operation, under the direction of Senator Marconnet. As the commandos enter the hospital, they murder Al Tayeb. Adam and Pee Wee kill the commandos and escape with Al Tayeb's daughter. Kruger leads a second team to dispose of Victor and the other gang members. Kruger also attempts to murder Victor's children, but Adam arrives in time to kill Kruger and reunite with Hélène and Jonathan. Lastly, Pee Wee and Adam expose Senator Marconnet's connections to Al Tayeb, which makes front page news.

== Cast ==
- Alban Lenoir as Adam Franco
- Eric Cantona as Victor Pastore
- Thibault de Montalembert as Kruger
- Sveva Alviti as Natalya
- Saïdou Camara as Pee Wee
- Lucille Guillaume as Hélène
- Kevin Layne as Moktar
- Philippe Résimont as Sénateur Marconnet
- Vincent Heneine as Cisko
- Nathalie Odzierejko as Mona
- Steve Tientcheu as Youssef
- Constantin Vidal as JB
- Noé Chabbat as Jonathan
- Hugo Dillon as Manu
- Jamel Elgharbi as Bogdan
- Soufiane Hafraoui as Karim
- Sébastien Lalanne as Jacques

== Critical reception ==
On Rotten Tomatoes, the film has an approval rating of 75% based on reviews from 8 critics, with an average rating of 5.4/10. Noel Murray of the Los Angeles Times wrote that AKA does not innovate in the undercover genre, but he praised Florent Astolfi's moody cinematography and Etienne Forget's score for adding texture and drive.

Roger Moore rated it 2 stars out of 5 based on the fact that the "incidents, relationships and even the intrigues here are all over-familiar tropes, which prevents this competently-made thriller ever rise to the level of engaging."

Eric Debarnot from Benzine, a French-language cultural web magazine, wrote that the film had achieved a worldwide and well-deserved, if albeit surprising, success.
