= Lionel Abelanski =

French actor (born 1964)

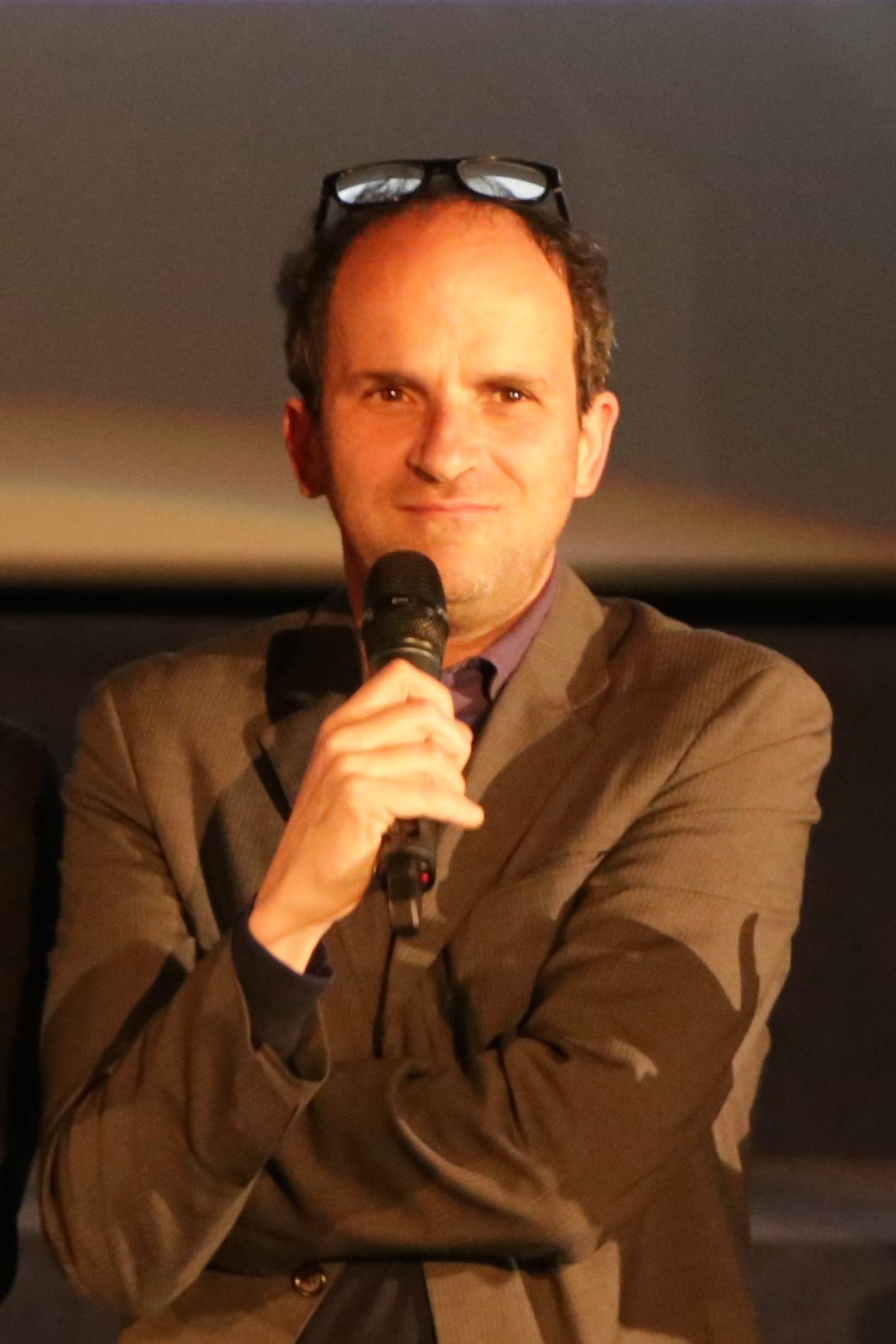
- Abelanski in June 2008
- Born: 22 October 1964 (age 61); Paris, France
- Occupation: Actor
- Years active: 1989–present

Lionel Abelanski (born 22 October 1964) is a French actor.

== Life and career ==
Abelanski was born in Paris, France. He has appeared in television and film roles since 1989. In 1999 he was nominated for the César Award for Most Promising Actor for the film Train of Life (1998).

== Filmography ==
| Year | Title | Role | Director | Notes |
|---|---|---|---|---|
| 1989 | Mama, There's a Man in Your Bed | The sick guy | Coline Serreau | |
| 1993 | Méprises multiples | | Christian Charmetant | Short |
| 1993 | La Classe américaine | Dubbed voice | Michel Hazanavicius & Dominique Mézerette | TV movie |
| 1995 | Douce France | The seller | Malik Chibane | |
| 1995 | Le futur | | Dominique Farrugia | Short |
| 1995 | Tango, mambo et cha-cha-cha | Jérôme Richon | Françoise Decaux-Thomelet | TV movie |
| 1996 | A Saturday on Earth | Michel | Diane Bertrand | |
| 1996 | Delphine 1, Yvan 0 | Thierry | Dominique Farrugia | |
| 1996 | Coup de vice | The Israeli | Patrick Levy | |
| 1996 | Coeur de cible | Street Man | Laurent Heynemann | TV movie |
| 1997 | Didier | Charlie Abitbol | Alain Chabat | |
| 1997 | La femme du cosmonaute | Yves | Jacques Monnet | |
| 1997 | I Got a Woman | Fred | Yvan Attal | Short |
| 1997 | La méthode | Olivier | Thomas Béguin | Short |
| 1997 | Combats de femme | Marcel | Nicolas Cuche | TV series (1 episode) |
| 1998 | Train of Life | Shlomo | Radu Mihăileanu | Nominated - César Award for Most Promising Actor |
| 1999 | Les parasites | Mathias | Philippe de Chauveron | |
| 1999 | Mes amis | Christophe | Michel Hazanavicius | |
| 1999 | Trafic d'influence | Serge | Dominique Farrugia | |
| 1999 | Le voyage à Paris | The illuminated traveler | Marc-Henri Dufresne | |
| 1999 | Accidents | | Pascal Laëthier | Short |
| 2000 | Nationale 7 | Roland | Jean-Pierre Sinapi | |
| 2000 | En attendant | Batman | Serge Hazanavicius | Short |
| 2000 | Contre la montre | Antoine | Jean-Pierre Sinapi | TV movie |
| 2001 | Belphegor, Phantom of the Louvre | Simonnet | Jean-Paul Salomé | |
| 2001 | My Wife Is an Actress | Georges | Yvan Attal | |
| 2002 | Varsovie-Paris | | Idit Cebula | Short |
| 2002 | Ces jours heureux | Jean-François Bichavent | Éric Toledano and Olivier Nakache | Short |
| 2001–03 | Caméra Café | Various | Francis Duquet | TV series (3 episodes) |
| 2003 | Mais Qui a tué Pamela Rose? | Thomas Filbee | Éric Lartigau | |
| 2003 | Bienvenue au gîte | Philippe | Claude Duty | |
| 2003 | La Beuze | Perez | François Desagnat & Thomas Sorriaux | |
| 2003 | Scotch | Max | Julien Rambaldi | Short |
| 2003 | La calvitude | Benoit | Julien Weill | Short |
| 2003 | Spartacus | The security chief | Virginie Lovisone | Short |
| 2003 | Toute une histoire | 40-year-old guy | Jean Rousselot | Short |
| 2003 | Le gang des poupées | Julien | Philomène Esposito | TV movie |
| 2003 | Le grand plongeoir | Pierre-Yves Corto | Tristan Carné | TV mini-series |
| 2004 | Narco | The supermarket manager | Tristan Aurouet & Gilles Lellouche | |
| 2004 | Le grand rôle | Simon Laufer | Steve Suissa | |
| 2004 | Double zéro | System D | Gérard Pirès | |
| 2004 | Un petit jeu sans conséquence | Patrick | Bernard Rapp | |
| 2004 | Tout le plaisir est pour moi | Oscar | Isabelle Broué | |
| 2004 | Casablanca Driver | Georges Devulf | Maurice Barthélemy | |
| 2004 | Alive | José | Frédéric Berthe | |
| 2004 | La nourrice | Valentin | Renaud Bertrand | TV movie |
| 2004 | Maigret | Martin | Claudio Tonetti | TV series (1 episode) |
| 2004 | Le Camarguais | Jean-Jean | William Gotesman | TV series (1 episode) |
| 2005 | Not Here to Be Loved | Thierry | Stéphane Brizé | |
| 2005 | Let's Be Friends | Daniel | Éric Toledano and Olivier Nakache | |
| 2005 | Cavalcade | Handica Sellor | Steve Suissa | |
| 2005 | Itinéraires | Master Campion | Christophe Otzenberger | |
| 2005 | Mes voeux les plus sincères | Laurent | Arnaud Cassand | Short |
| 2005 | Les femmes d'abord | Hamor | Peter Kassovitz | TV movie |
| 2005 | Riquet | Berthelot | Bertrand Arthuys | TV movie |
| 2005 | L'homme qui voulait passer à la télé | Buffy / Thierry Mulet | Amar Arhab & Fabrice Michelin | TV movie |
| 2005 | La famille Zappon | Marco | Amar Arhab & Fabrice Michelin | TV movie |
| 2006 | Poltergay | Salopette | Éric Lavaine | |
| 2006 | Those Happy Days | The train's driver | Éric Toledano and Olivier Nakache | |
| 2006 | Une histoire de pieds | Eric | David & Stéphane Foenkinos | Short |
| 2006 | Vive la bombe! | The geologist | Jean-Pierre Sinapi | TV movie |
| 2007 | Atonement | Frenchman | Joe Wright | |
| 2007 | Zone libre | Simon | Christophe Malavoy | |
| 2007 | Les yeux bandés | Denis | Thomas Lilti | |
| 2007 | Je déteste les enfants des autres | Fred | Anne Fassio | |
| 2007 | Le secret de Salomon | Adam Goldman | David Charhon | Short |
| 2007 | La plus belle fille du monde | | Stephane Couston | Short |
| 2007 | La belle et le sauvage | Berthelot | Bertrand Arthuys | TV movie |
| 2008 | Sagan | Bernard Frank | Diane Kurys | |
| 2008 | 15 ans et demi | Guy | François Desagnat & Thomas Sorriaux | |
| 2008 | Le syndrome de Jerusalem | Jonas | Stéphane Bélaïsch & Emmanuel Naccache | |
| 2008 | Palizzi | | Serge Hazanavicius | TV series (2 episodes) |
| 2008 | Nos enfants chéris | Arnaud / Hervé | Benoît Cohen | TV series (3 episodes) |
| 2009 | Le Concert | Jean-Paul Carrère | Radu Mihăileanu | |
| 2009 | Tellement proches | Charly | Éric Toledano and Olivier Nakache | |
| 2009 | Safari | Benoit | Olivier Baroux | |
| 2009 | Ticket gagnant | Benoît Vautrin | Julien Weill | TV movie |
| 2010 | Protéger & servir | Monitor shot | Éric Lavaine | |
| 2010 | Imogène McCarthery | Aneurin Archaft | Alexandre Charlot & Franck Magnier | |
| 2010 | A Distant Neighborhood | Godin | Sam Garbarski | |
| 2010 | Un peu d'écume | Alain Vernet | Christel Delahaye | Short |
| 2010 | Son souffle contre mon épaule | | Emmanuel & Gautier About | Short |
| 2010 | Mademoiselle Drot | Hervé Chambart-Martin | Christian Carter & Christian Faure | TV movie |
| 2010 | Au bas de l'échelle | Gilou | Arnauld Mercadier | TV movie |
| 2011 | Beur sur la ville | The examiner | Djamel Bensalah | |
| 2011 | Mais y va où le monde ? | The factor | Serge Papagalli | |
| 2011 | L'art de séduire | Julien | Guy Mazarguil | |
| 2012 | The Players | The seminar's director | Michel Hazanavicius | |
| 2012 | On the Other Side of the Tracks | Daniel Cardinet | David Charhon | |
| 2012 | La banda Picasso | Max Jacob | Fernando Colomo | |
| 2012 | Mais Qui a tué Pamela Rose? | | Kad Merad & Olivier Baroux | |
| 2012 | Rue Mandar | Serge | Idit Cebula | |
| 2012 | Mon canard | Denis | Vincent Fouquet & Emmanuelle Michelet | Short |
| 2012 | L'effet coccinelle | | Nouriel Malka & Jérôme Sau | Short |
| 2012 | À dix minutes des naturistes | Michel | Stéphane Clavier | TV movie |
| 2013 | Kidon | Eric | Emmanuel Naccache | |
| 2013 | Boule & Bill | The school's director | Alexandre Charlot & Franck Magnier | |
| 2013 | À la française | | Édouard Baer | TV movie |
| 2013 | Myster Mocky présente | | Jean-Pierre Mocky | TV series (1 episode) |
| 2014 | Magic in the Moonlight | Doctor | Woody Allen | |
| 2014 | Nicholas on Holiday | The architect | Laurent Tirard | |
| 2014 | Barbecue | Laurent | Éric Lavaine | |
| 2014 | Tu es si jolie ce soir | Doctor | Jean-Pierre Mocky | |
| 2014 | Au nom des fils | Pierre Chasseuil | Christian Faure | TV movie |
| 2014 | La loi | Antoine Veil | Christian Faure (3) | TV movie |
| 2015 | Je compte sur vous | Lefèvre | Pascal Elbé | |
| 2015 | Une chance de trop | Louis Barthel | François Velle | TV mini-series |
| 2015 | Scènes de ménages | Miguel | Francis Duquet | TV series (1 episode) |
| 2015 | Ma pire angoisse | The Union Council's President | Vladimir Rodionov | TV series (1 episode) |
| 2016 | The First, the Last | The warehouse's man | Bouli Lanners | |
| 2016 | Quenottes | Dad | Gil Pinheiro & Pascal Thiebaux | Short |
| 2016 | Blanc sur la comète | Marc | Christophe Sailly | Short |
| 2016 | La Fin du Monde | | Julien Josselin & Valentin Vincent | Short |
| 2016 | Du Vent dans les Branches de Sassafras | Eye of Perdrix / Eye of Lynx | Emmanuel Murat | TV movie |
| 2016 | Open at Night | Lolo | Édouard Baer | |
| 2016 | Fais pas ci, fais pas ça | The gynecologist | Philippe Lefebvre | TV series (1 episode) |
| 2017 | Sous le même toit | | Dominique Farrugia | |
| 2017 | Blockbuster | Simon | July Hygreck | |
| 2023 | Bernadette | Yvon Molinier, the driver | Léa Domenach | |
| 2023 | Les petites victoires | Saturnin | Mélanie Auffret | |
| 2023 | Guardians of the Formula | | Dragan Bjelogrlić | |
| 2024 | 14 Days to Get Better | Luc | Édouard Pluvieux | |
