= Les Tuche 3 =

- Theatrical release poster
- Directed by: Olivier Baroux
- Screenplay by: Olivier Baroux; Nessim Chikhaoui; Julien Hervé; Philippe Mechelen; Jean-Paul Rouve
- Produced by: Richard Grandpierre
- Starring: Jean-Paul Rouve; Isabelle Nanty
- Cinematography: Christian Abomnes
- Edited by: Flora Volpelière
- Music by: Martin Rappeneau
- Distributed by: Pathé
- Release date: January 2018
- Running time: 92 minutes
- Country: France
- Language: French
- Budget: $14.8 million
- Box office: $47.4 million

Les Tuche 3, also known as The Magic Tuche, is a 2018 French comedy film co-written by Olivier Baroux, Nessim Chikhaoui, Julien Hervé, Philippe Mechelen and Jean-Paul Rouve and directed by Olivier Baroux. It is a sequel of Les Tuche and Les Tuche 2. It was released in January 2018 and was a commercial success. It received two sequels, Les Tuche 4 (2021) and God Save the Tuche (2025).

In the film, a villager pleads with the President of France to end his village's isolation. When his request is ignored, the villager runs as a candidate in the presidential election. When he becomes the new president, the man finds that the task of governing France is difficult.

== Synopsis ==
Jeff Tuche (played by Jean-Paul Rouve) is initially delighted with the news that the new TGV is passing near his village Bouzolles, but then discovers to his horror that the TGV will not have a stop in Bouzolles. He pleads with the President of France to reconsider the itinerary of the new TGV so that his village doesn't remain in isolation from the world. But not hearing from the Élysée, he decides to run for the French presidential election and succeeds in becoming the new President. This leaves Jeff with the daunting task of how to govern France.

== Cast ==
- Jean-Paul Rouve as Jeff Tuche
- Isabelle Nanty as Cathy Tuche
- Claire Nadeau as Mamie Suze
- Sarah Stern as Stéphanie Tuche
- Pierre Lottin as Wilfried Tuche
- Théo Fernandez as Donald Tuche
- Marc Duret as Laurent Dupuis
- Ralph Amoussou as Georges Diouf
