= Judith El Zein =

French actress (born 1976)

- Born: 1 November 1976 (age 49); Paris, France
- Occupation: Actress
- Years active: 1991–present

Judith El Zein (born 1 November 1976) is a French actress.

== Filmography ==
Year	Title	Role	Director	Notes
1994	Les Cordier, juge et flic	Florence	Alain Bonnot	TV series (1 episode)
1995	Navarro	The prostitute	Nicolas Ribowski	TV series (1 episode)
1996	Dans un grand vent de fleurs	Estelle	Gérard Vergez	TV mini-series
1996	Julie Lescaut	Hélène Vinci	Josée Dayan	TV series (1 episode)
1997	Amour et confusions	The hostess	Patrick Braoudé	
1997	Navarro	Marion Lesage	Patrick Jamain	TV series (1 episode)
1997	P.J.	Fanny	Gérard Vergez	TV series (3 episodes)
1998	Famille de coeur	Hélène	Gérard Vergez	TV movie
1999	Joséphine, ange gardien	Dominique	Dominique Baron	TV series (1 episode)
2000	Quand on sera grand	Christine	Renaud Cohen	
2000	Mon prince viendra	The woman	Philippe Lasry	Short
2000	Même pas mal		Diastème	Short
2000	Vertiges	Julie	Christian François	TV series (1 episode)
2000	Crimes en série	Ingrid	Patrick Dewolf	TV series (1 episode)
2001	La stratégie de l'échec	Sylvie	Dominique Farrugia	
2001	Mathieu Corot	Valérie	Pascale Dallet	TV series (1 episode)
2002	Hypnotized and Hysterical	Marianne's mother	Claude Duty	
2003	Rire et châtiment	Agnès	Isabelle Doval	
2003	L'île maudite	Sophie	Rémy Burkel	TV movie
2003	Avocats & associés	Isabelle Laroche	Alexandre Pidoux	TV series (1 episode)
2004	The Story of My Life	The Yuppie	Laurent Tirard	
2004	Les robinsonnes	Isabelle	Laurent Dussaux	TV movie
2004	Joséphine, ange gardien	Carole	Henri Helman	TV series (1 episode)
2004	Premiers secours	Véronique Meyer	Didier Delaître	TV series (1 episode)
2005	P.J.	Anne-Marie Henry	Gérard Vergez	TV series (1 episode)
2006	Dans Paris	The Rain woman	Christophe Honoré	
2006	Un ticket pour l'espace	Soizic's colleague	Eric Lartigau	
2006	L'uomo che rubò la Gioconda	Françoise	Fabrizio Costa	TV movie
2006	Femmes de loi	Myriam Nolay	Sylvie Ayme	TV series (1 episode)
2007	Confidences	Sophie	Laurent Dussaux	TV mini-series
2007	Sauveur Giordano	Hélène Destouches	Bertrand Van Effenterre	TV series (1 episode)
2007	Fargas	Isabelle Audoni	Didier Delaître	TV series (1 episode)
2007	Franck Keller	Muriel Fortini	Dominique Tabuteau	TV series (1 episode)
2008	Paris	Mélanie Verneuil	Cédric Klapisch	
2008	Le bruit des gens autour	Léna	Diastème	
2008	Cellule identité	Marie-Agnès Daquin	Stéphane Kappes	TV series (1 episode)
2008	Clara Sheller	Jeanne	Alain Berliner	TV series (6 episodes)
2010	Comme les cinq doigts de la main	Karine Hayoun	Alexandre Arcady	
2010	L'homme sans nom	Clara Delage	Sylvain Monod	TV movie
2011	Monsieur Papa	Sonia	Kad Merad	
2012	What's in a Name ?	Anna	Alexandre de La Patellière & Matthieu Delaporte	
2012	Ma première fois	Jacqueline	Marie-Castille Mention-Schaar	
2013	16 ans ou presque	Agnès Dorgeval	Tristan Séguéla	
2014	Supercondriaque	Norah Zvenka	Dany Boon	
2014	Kaboul Kitchen	Barbara Braque	Frédéric Balekdjian	TV series (1 episode)
2015	Daddy or Mommy	Virginie	Martin Bourboulon	
2015	Intrusion	Astrid	Xavier Palud	TV mini-series
2016	Marseille	Elena	Kad Merad	
2016	Papa ou maman 2	Virginie	Martin Bourboulon	
2017	Les ex	Audrey	Maurice Barthélemy	
2017	Paris etc	Alexandra	Zabou Breitman	TV series (3 episodes)
2018	I Feel Better	Elise	Jean-Pierre Améris	
2018	J'attends Jupiter	The casting director	Agathe Riedinger	Short
2019	Walter	Laurence	Varante Soudjian	
2019	Etats d'urgence	Rachel Santini	Vincent Lannoo	TV movie
2019	Le Prénom			

== Theater ==
Year	Title	Author	Director
1991	Miss Julie	August Strindberg	Xavier Marcheschi
1991	La Peur des coups	Georges Courteline	Xavier Marcheschi
1992	The Trickster of Seville and the Stone Guest	Tirso de Molina	Jean-Louis Jacopin
1994	La Princesse d'Élide	Molière	Jean-Luc Revol
1995	L'Heureux Stratagème	Pierre de Marivaux	Jean-Luc Revol
2000	Le Béret de la Tortue	François Rollin	François Rollin
2001	The West Side Waltz	Ernest Thompson	Jean-Luc Revol
2010	What's in a Name ?	Alexandre de La Patellière & Matthieu Delaporte	Bernard Murat
