= Jean-Paul Rouve =

French actor and director (born 1967)

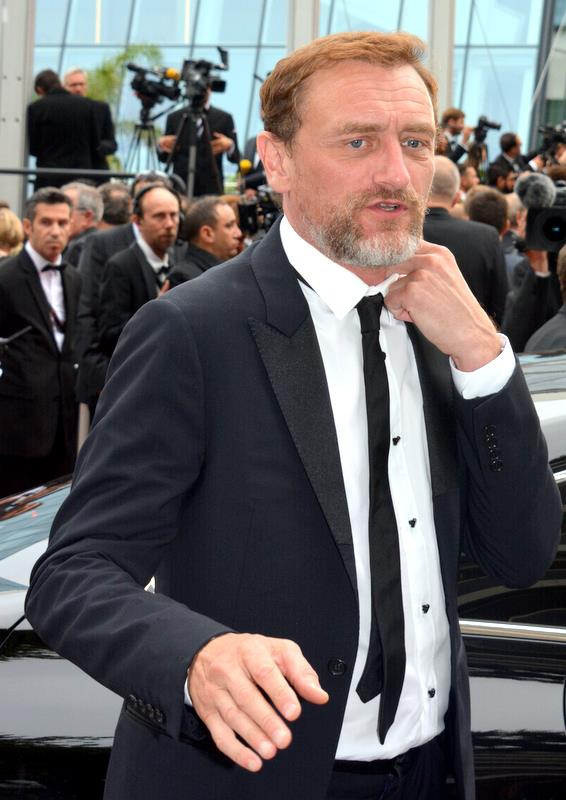
- Rouve at the 2016 Cannes Film Festival
- Born: Jean-Paul Richard Marcel Rouve; 26 January 1967 (age 59); Malo-les-Bains, France
- Occupations: Actor; film director; screenwriter; producer
- Years active: 1993–present

Jean-Paul Richard Marcel Rouve (French pronunciation: [ʒɑ̃pɔl ʁuv]; born 26 January 1967) is a French actor, screenwriter, film producer and director. He is a founding member of the Les Robins des Bois comedy troupe, active from 1996 onwards.

He has appeared in over 70 film and television productions since 1993, having held roles in comedy films such as Asterix & Obelix: Mission Cleopatra (2002), RRRrrrr!!! (2004), Those Happy Days (2006) and Les Tuche (2011).

On 25 March 2026, he was made a knight of the Legion of Honour by President Emmanuel Macron.

== Personal life ==
A native of Malo-les-Bains, Rouve graduated from the Cours Florent drama school in Paris, where he studied theatre in the class of Isabelle Nanty (with whom he would later star in several productions), alongside Pierre-François Martin-Laval, Marina Foïs, Maurice Barthélemy, Pascal Vincent and Élise Larnicol. Together, the six would form The Royal Imperial Green Rabbit Company troupe, which would soon become Les Robins des Bois.

Rouve lived several years with the novelist Bénédicte Martin; the couple had a son.

== Filmography ==
=== Filmmaker ===
Year	Title	Credited as			Notes
Year	Title	Director	Screenwriter	Producer	Notes
2004	RRRrrrr!!!		Yes		
2008	The Easy Way	Yes	Yes		
2012	Quand je serai petit	Yes	Yes	Yes	As associate producer
2013	Denis		Yes		
2015	Memories	Yes	Yes	Yes	As co-producer

=== Actor ===
Year	Title	Role	Director	Notes
1993	C'est mon histoire	Renaud	Pierre Joassin	TV series (1 episode)
1993–1999	Julie Lescaut	Agent Leveil	Several	TV series (26 episodes)
1996	Le souffleur		Bruno Sauvard & Michael Viger	Short
1996	Le R.I.F.	Party Leader	Michel Andrieu	TV series (1 episode)
1997	La famille Sapajou	Biscarros	Élisabeth Rappeneau	TV movie
1998	Serial Lover	Edouard 'Douad' Pied	James Huth	
1999	Karnaval	Pine	Thomas Vincent	
1999	Trafic d'influence	Jean-Frédéric	Dominique Farrugia	
1999	L'amour déchiré		Yann Piquer	Short
1999	Le pire des Robins des Bois	Various	Several	TV series (22 episodes)
2000–2001	La cape et l'épée	Various	Several	TV series (24 episodes)
2001	Tanguy	Bruno Lemoine	Étienne Chatiliez	
2001	Le petit poucet	The Queen's rider	Olivier Dahan	
2001	La stratégie de l'échec	Luc	Dominique Farrugia	
2001	Il est difficile de tuer quelqu'un, même un lundi	Jean	Eric Valette	Short
2001	H	Steward	Éric Lartigau	TV series (1 episode)
2001	Caméra Café	New Employee	Francis Duquet	TV series (1 episode)
2002	Monsieur Batignole	Pierre-Jean Lamour	Gérard Jugnot	César Award for Most Promising Actor
2002	Asterix & Obelix: Mission Cleopatra	Caius Antivirus	Alain Chabat	
2002	Whatever You Say	Patrick	Guillaume Canet	
2002	Jojo la frite	Joseph	Nicolas Cuche	
2002	Le 17	Tran N'Guyen	Several	TV series (7 episodes)
2003	I, Cesar	Gym Teacher	Richard Berry	
2003	The Car Keys	Himself	Laurent Baffie	
2003	Mais qui a tué Pamela Rose ?	Steve Marley	Éric Lartigau	
2004	A Very Long Engagement	Postman	Jean-Pierre Jeunet	
2004	RRRrrrr!!!	Pierre The Blond	Alain Chabat	
2004	Podium	Couscous	Yann Moix	Nominated - César Award for Best Supporting Actor
2004	Un petit jeu sans conséquence	Serge Hatier	Bernard Rapp	
2004	Casablanca Driver	Guy	Maurice Barthélemy	
2005	Let's Be Friends	Claude Mendelbaum	Éric Toledano and Olivier Nakache	
2005	Boudu	Hubert	Gérard Jugnot	
2005	Bunker paradise	John Devaux	Stefan Liberski	
2006	Those Happy Days	Vincent	Éric Toledano and Olivier Nakache	
2006	Arthur and the Invisibles	Armand	Luc Besson	
2006	Le temps des porte-plumes	Gustave	Daniel Duval	
2007	La Vie en Rose	Louis Gassion	Olivier Dahan	
2007	Snow White: The Sequel	Charming Prince	Picha	
2007	L'île aux trésors	Dr. Livesey	Alain Berbérian	
2007	Ce soir, je dors chez toi	Alex	Olivier Baroux	
2007	Premier voyage	Dad	Grégoire Sivan	Short
2008	La très très grande entreprise	Denis Bosquet	Pierre Jolivet	
2008	The Easy Way	Albert Spaggiari	Jean-Paul Rouve	
2008	The Maiden and the Wolves	Émile Garcin	Gilles Legrand	
2009	Arthur and the Revenge of Maltazard	Armand	Luc Besson	
2009	Le coach	Patrick Marmignon	Olivier Doran	
2009	Myster Mocky présente		Jean-Pierre Mocky	TV series (1 episode)
2010	The Extraordinary Adventures of Adèle Blanc-Sec	Justin de Saint-Hubert	Luc Besson	
2010	Arthur 3: The War of the Two Worlds	Armand	Luc Besson	
2010	En chantier, monsieur Tanner !	Paul Tanner	Stefan Liberski	TV movie
2011	Les Tuche	Jeff Tuche	Olivier Baroux	
2011	Nobody Else But You	David Rousseau	Gérald Hustache-Mathieu	
2011	Légitime défense	Benoît	Pierre Lacan	
2011	Low Cost	Dagobert	Maurice Barthélemy	
2011	Le grand restaurant II	The Brother	Gérard Pullicino	TV movie
2012	Quand je serai petit	Mathias	Jean-Paul Rouve	
2013	Turning Tide	Denis Juhel	Christophe Offenstein	
2013	Denis	Denis	Lionel Bailliu	
2014	Never on the First Night	Marc	Melissa Drigeard	
2014	La queue	The Man	Yacine Sersar	Short
2014	Ce soir je vais tuer l'assassin de mon fils	Philippe Tessier	Pierre Aknine	TV movie
2015	Memories	Philippe	Jean-Paul Rouve	
2015	The New Adventures of Aladdin	Great Vizier	Arthur Benzaquen	
2015	Scènes de ménages	Wedding Planner	Francis Duquet	TV series (1 episode)
2016	Les Tuche 2	Jeff Tuche	Olivier Baroux	
2016	Artaud, le Suréel y los Tarahumaras	Antonin Artaud	Lara Quaglia	
2016	Papa, Alexandre, Maxime & Eduardo	Alexandre	Simon Masnay	Short
2017	Dalida	Lucien Morisse	Lisa Azuelos	
2017	C'est la vie !	Guy	Éric Toledano and Olivier Nakache	
2018	Alad'2	The vizier		Cameo
2019	Donne-moi des ailes	Christian	Nicolas Vanier	
2023	Consent	Gabriel Matzneff	Vanessa Filho	
