= Les Tuche (disambiguation) =

Les Tuche may refer to:

- Les Tuche, 2011 film
- Les Tuche 2: Le Rêve américain, 2016 film
- Les Tuche 3 or The Magic Tuche, 2018 film
