= Isabelle Nanty =

French actress (born 1962)

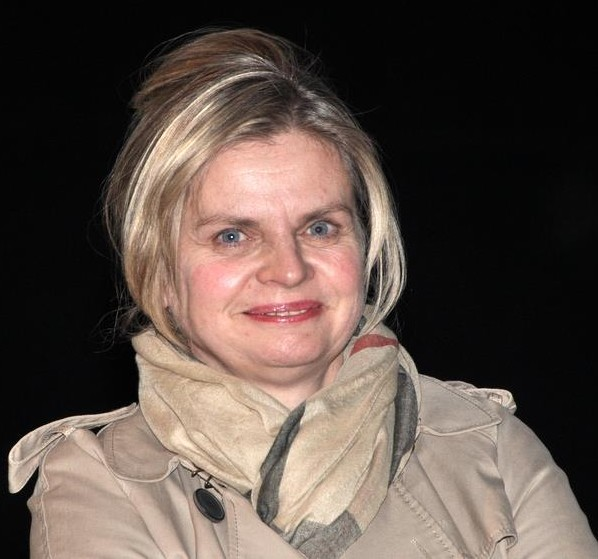
- Nanty in 2013
- Born: Isabelle Marie-Josée Nanty; 21 January 1962 (age 64); Verdun, Meuse, France
- Occupations: Actress, film director, screenwriter, theatre director
- Years active: 1983–present
- Children: 1
- Relatives: Kristofer Hivju (cousin)

Isabelle Marie-Josée Nanty (French pronunciation: [izabɛl nɑ̃ti]; born 21 January 1962) is a French actress, film and theatre director and screenwriter.

== Career ==
Nanty was a teacher for several years at the Cours Florent. She then received a nomination for the César Award for Most Promising Actress for her performance in Tatie Danielle (1990), and two nominations for the César Award for Best Supporting Actress for Amélie (2001) and Not on the Lips (2003).

She's also known for her roles in La Belle Histoire (1992) directed by Claude Lelouch, Les Visiteurs (1993), Asterix & Obelix: Mission Cleopatra (2002), and her leading roles in Les Tuche (2011), Serial Teachers (2013) and its sequel Serial Teachers 2 (2015).

== Personal life ==
In 2004, Nanty adopted Tallulah, a one-and-a-half-year-old girl, born in 2002 in China.

== Theatre ==
=== Actress ===
Year	Title	Author	Director
1984	Le Sablier	Nina Companeez	Nina Companeez
1987	Richard III	William Shakespeare	Francis Huster
1987	Dom Juan	Molière	Francis Huster
1988	The Singular Life of Albert Nobbs	Simone Benmussa	Nina Companeez
1992	Saloperies de merde	Michael Cohen	Michael Cohen
1993	The Seagull	Anton Chekhov	Isabelle Nanty
1994–95	Tartuffe	Molière	Jacques Weber
1996	Robin des Bois, d'à peu près Alexandre Dumas	Pierre-François Martin-Laval & Marina Foïs	Pierre-François Martin-Laval
1997	Le Goût de la hiérarchie	Édouard Baer	Édouard Baer
1997	Les loutres ne jouent pas du ukulélé	Pierre-François Martin-Laval	Pierre-François Martin-Laval
1998	Du désavantage du vent	Éric Ruf	Éric Ruf
2008–09	Les Deux Canards	Tristan Bernard & Alfred Athis	Alain Sachs
2012	Colors	Esteban Perroy & Franck Porquiet	Alain Sachs
2020	Summer of 85	Mme Robin	François Ozon

=== Director ===
Year	Title	Author
1993	The Seagull	Anton Tchekhov
1994	Journal de Vaslav Nijinski	Vaslav Nijinsky
1997	Décalages	Gad Elmaleh
2001	Cravate club	Fabrice Roger-Lacan
2001	La Vie normale	Gad Elmaleh
2005	Aujourd'hui, c'est Ferrier	Julie Ferrier
2005	L'Autre c'est moi	Gad Elmaleh
2006	Arthur en vrai	Arthur
2007	Irrésistible	Fabrice Roger-Lacan
2011	Quelqu'un comme vous	Fabrice Roger-Lacan
2012	Garçon manqué	Andy Cocq
2013	52e Gala de l'Union des artistes	Elsa Caillart
2014	Sur le fil	Virginie Hocq
2016	Je vous écoute	Bénabar
2017	L'Hôtel du libre échange	Georges Feydeau & Maurice Desvallières

== Filmography ==
Year	Title	Role	Director	Notes
1983	Le faucon	Radio host	Paul Boujenah	
1985	Red Kiss	Jeanine	Véra Belmont	
1986	On a volé Charlie Spencer!	The little blond	Francis Huster	
1986	Un moment d'inattention	Claudine	Liliane de Kermadec	TV movie
1986	Les aventuriers du Nouveau-Monde	Bernadette	Allan Kroeker, Victor Vicas, ...	TV mini-series
1987	Beatrice	The baby-sitter	Bertrand Tavernier	
1988	Preuve d'amour	Anne-Marie	Miguel Courtois	
1989	Les deux Fragonard	Lisette	Philippe Le Guay	
1990	Tatie Danielle	Sandrine Vonnier	Étienne Chatiliez	Nominated - César Award for Most Promising Actress
1990	L'Autrichienne	Queen Milliot	Pierre Granier-Deferre	
1992	La Belle Histoire	Isabelle	Claude Lelouch	
1992	Sexes faibles!	Douce Mamirolle	Serge Meynard	
1993	Les Visiteurs	Fabienne Morlot	Jean-Marie Poiré	
1993	Départ en vacances	Mother	Daniel Delume	Short
1993	L'instit	Christiane	Jacques Ertaud	TV series (1 episode)
1994	Les amoureux	Maryline	Catherine Corsini	
1994	La folie douce	Gloria	Frédéric Jardin	
1994	Pourquoi maman est dans mon lit?	Police Inspector	Patrick Malakian	
1995	Happiness Is in the Field	Worker	Étienne Chatiliez	
1996	Il faut que ça brille!	The woman	Pascale Pouzadoux	Short
1996	Le secret d'Iris	Evelyne	Élisabeth Rappeneau	TV movie
1996	La femme de la forêt	Valentine	Arnaud Sélignac	TV mini-series
1996	L'histoire du samedi	Antoinette	Denys Granier-Deferre	TV series (1 episode)
1997	Qui va Pino va sano	Anne-France	Fabrice Roger-Lacan	Short
1997	Inspecteur Médeuze	Nadège	Étienne Méry	TV series (1 episode)
1998	Serial Lover	Isabelle	James Huth	
1998	Ça reste entre nous	Martine	Martin Lamotte	
1998	Moi, j'ai pas la télé	The mother	Pauline Baer	Short
1999	L'origine de la tendresse	Elise	Alain-Paul Mallard	Short
2000	Taking Wing	Artistic counselor	Steve Suissa	
2000	La bostella	Mathilda	Édouard Baer	
2000	Les frères Soeur	Marion	Frédéric Jardin	
2001	Amélie	Georgette	Jean-Pierre Jeunet	Nominated - César Award for Best Supporting Actress
2001	17 rue Bleue	Françoise	Chad Chenouga	
2002	Asterix & Obelix: Mission Cleopatra	Itinéris	Alain Chabat	
2002	3 zéros	Sylvie	Fabien Onteniente	
2002	Edouard est marrant	Herself	Riton Liebman	Short
2002	À l'abri des regards indiscrets	Rich Mother	Ruben Alves & Hugo Gélin	Short
2002	Au suivant!	Jo	Jeanne Biras	Short
2003	Not on the Lips	Arlette Poumaillac	Alain Resnais	Nominated - César Award for Best Supporting Actress
2003	Toutes les filles sont folles	Vanille	Pascale Pouzadoux	
2003	Le bison (et sa voisine Dorine)	Dorine	Isabelle Nanty	
2004	J'me sens pas belle	Charlotte	Bernard Jeanjean	
2004	Casablanca Driver	Léa Driver	Maurice Barthélemy	
2006	Essaye-moi	Jacqueline's mother	Pierre-François Martin-Laval	
2006	Désaccord parfait	Rageaud	Antoine de Caunes	
2007	Santa Closed	Danielle	Douglas Attal	Short
2008	Disco	The Baroness	Fabien Onteniente	
2008	Agathe Cléry	Joëlle	Étienne Chatiliez	
2009	Incognito	Alexandra	Éric Lavaine	
2009	Trésor	Brigitte	Claude Berri & François Dupeyron	
2009	King Guillaume	Paméla-Gisèle	Pierre-François Martin-Laval	
2010	Le grand restaurant	A client	Gérard Pullicino	TV movie
2010	Au siècle de Maupassant	Julie Follavoine	Gérard Jourd'hui	TV series (1 episode)
2010–2017	Fais pas ci, fais pas ça	Christiane Potin	Laurent Dussaux, Cathy Verney, ...	TV series (12 episodes)
2011	Les Tuche	Cathy Tuche	Olivier Baroux	
2012	The Players	Christine	Michel Hazanavicius	
2012	Cendrillon au Far West	The Grand Duchess	Pascal Hérold	
2013	Serial Teachers	Gladys	Pierre-François Martin-Laval	
2013	Queens of the Ring	Sandrine Pédrono	Jean-Marc Rudnicki	
2013	Scènes de ménages	Liliane's friend	Francis Duquet	TV series (2 episodes)
2013	Le bureau des affaires sexistes	The judge	Tristan Aurouet	TV series short (24 episodes)
2014	Le mystère des jonquilles	Willard	Jean-Pierre Mocky	
2014	Le grimoire d'Arkandias	Bertha Boucher	Alexandre Castagnetti & Julien Simonet	
2014	Couleur locale	Marianne	Coline Serreau & Samuel Tasinaje	TV movie
2014	Resistance	Paulette	Miguel Courtois, David Delrieux, ...	TV mini-series
2015	Serial Teachers 2	Gladys	Pierre-François Martin-Laval	
2015	SODA : le rêve américain	Marie-Amélie	Nath Dumont	TV movie
2015	Casting(s)	Herself	Hugo Gélin & Pierre Niney	TV series (1 episode)
2015	Peplum	Forta	Philippe Lefebvre	TV series (12 episodes)
2016	Les Tuche 2	Cathy Tuche	Olivier Baroux	
2016	West Coast	Copkiller & King Kong's Mother	Benjamin Weill	
2016–present	Munch	Gabrielle Munchovski	Nicolas Guicheteau, Frédéric Berthe, ...	TV series (24 episodes)
2017	Mon poussin	Cléa Pèletier	Frédéric Forestier	
2018	Les Tuche 3	Cathy Tuche	Olivier Baroux	
2018	Gaston Lagaffe	Hall's voice	Pierre-François Martin-Laval	
2018	Alad'2	The operator	Lionel Steketee	
2018	Dessine-moi un alien	Gaëtan's mother	Ludovik Day	Short
2019	Fahim	Mathilde	Pierre-François Martin-Laval	
2020	Miss	Yolande	Ruben Alves	
2020	Eté 85		François Ozon	
2020	Le Grand restaurant 3		Romuald Boulanger & Pierre Palmade	TV movie Post-Production
2022	Bigbug	Françoise	Jean-Pierre Jeunet	Netflix

== Honours ==
- Officier of the Ordre national du Mérite (2017)
- Commandeur of the Ordre des Arts et des Lettres (2025)
