= Richard Grandpierre =

French film producer

Richard Grandpierre is a French film producer.

== Filmography ==
- La Vengeance d'une blonde, (1994)
- Comme un aimant, (2000)
- Brotherhood of the Wolf, (2001)
- Love Bites, (2001)
- Irréversible, (2002)
- Cash Truck, (2004)
- Saint Ange, (2004)
- Masai: The Rain Warriors, (2004)
- Locked Out, (2006)
- Them, (2006)
- Dante 01, (2008)
- Martyrs, (2008)
- Safari, (2009)
- Safari: Hors Piste, (2009)
- The Italian, (2010)
- Monsieur Papa, (2011)
- Les Tuche, (2011)
- Happiness Never Comes Alone, (2012)
- Mes héros, (2012)
- Zulu, (2013)
- Beauty and the Beast, (2014)
- On a marché sur Bangkok, (2014)
- Entre amis, (2015)
- Ice and the Sky, (2015)
- Les Tuche 2, (2016)
- Marseille, (2016)
- Le doudou, (2018)
- Les Tuche 3, (2018)
- Climax, (2018)
- Just a Gigolo, (2019)
- Rendez-vous chez les Malawas, (2019)
- Mon Cousin, (2019)
- Bigbug, (2022)
- Gentleman Cambrioleur, (upcoming)
