= Guy Lecluyse =

French comedian and actor (born 1962)

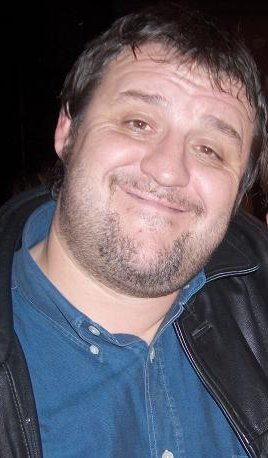
- Born: 29 June 1962 (age 63); Tourcoing, France
- Occupation: Actor
- Years active: 1988-present

Guy Lecluyse (born 29 June 1962) is a French comedian and actor. He appeared in more than forty films since 1988.

== Selected filmography ==
Film

Year	Title	Role	Notes
2003	The Car Keys	Bar Patron	
2004	36 Quai des Orfèvres	Groluc	
2005	Burnt Out	Gregory	
2006	Mr. Average	Roger	
2007	Chrysalis	Kovacs	
2008	Bienvenue chez les Ch'tis	Yann Vandernoout	
2008	The Last Deadly Mission	Jumbo	
2010	Nothing to Declare	Gregory Brioul	
2011	Les Tuche	Theo Van Brick	
2012	F.B.I. Frog Butthead Investigators	Kowachek	
2014	Supercondriaque	Soar Throat Patient	
2014	Fiston	Commissioner	
2016	Amis publics	Bruno Adgé	
2018	La Ch'tite famille	Gustave	

Television

Year	Title	Role	Notes
1995	Le Bébête Show	Bartender	Host
2006	Section de recherches	Quentin Pommel	Episode: "Dérapages"
2012-2015	Soda	Michel	714 episodes and 2 TV movies
2019	Scènes de ménages	Grandparents Contest MC	Episode: "La Ch'tit Compét"
2020	Profilage	Commissioner Jacques Berault	2 episodes
2023	Un stupéfiant Noël	Santa Claus	Television movie
