= Fais pas ci, fais pas ça =

2007–2017 French television series

- Genre: Comedy
- Created by: Anne Giafferi; Thierry Bizot
- Starring: Valérie Bonneton; Isabelle Gélinas; Bruno Salomone; Guillaume de Tonquédec
- Theme music composer: Philippe Kelly
- Country of origin: France
- Original language: French
- No. of seasons: 9
- No. of episodes: 68 (plus two special episodes)

Production
- Producers: Guillaume Renouil; Thierry Bizot
- Running time: 34 minutes (season 1); 44 minutes (season 2–9)
- Production company: France Télévisions

Original release
- Network: France 2
- Release: 8 September 2007 – 22 February 2017

Fais pas ci, fais pas ça (French: [fɛ pa si fɛ pa sa]; lit. 'Don't do this, don't do that') is a French television series created by Anne Giafferi and Thierry Bizot for France Télévisions, starring Valérie Bonneton, Isabelle Gélinas, Bruno Salomone and Guillaume de Tonquédec. The comedy series debuted on 8 September 2007 on France 2; after nine seasons, the final episode aired on 22 February 2017. In 2020 and 2024, two additional special episodes aired in December for the Christmas season.

The series is set in the Parisian suburb of Sèvres, following two neighbouring families raising their children, one conservatively (Lepic), one liberally (Bouley). The series was met with wide popular success and critical acclaim, reaching cult status in France. Ahead of the last episode airing, Le Monde wrote "it will not be easy to say goodbye."

== Cast ==
=== Main characters ===
Actor/Actress	Characters	Seasons
Bruno Salomone	Denis Bouley	season 1 — 9
Isabelle Gélinas	Valérie Bouley	season 1 — 9
Guillaume de Tonquédec	Renaud Lepic (and his half-brother Daniel)	season 1 — 9 (season 3)
Valérie Bonneton	Fabienne Lepic	season 1 — 9
Yaniss Lespert	Christophe Lepic	season 1 — 9
Tiphaine Haas	Soline Lepic	season 1 — 9
Alexandra Gentil	Tiphaine Kalamian	season 1 — 9
Cannelle Carré-Cassaigne	Charlotte Lepic	season 1 — 9
Lilian Dugois	Eliott Bouley	season 1 — 9
Timothée Kempen Hamel	Lucas Lepic	season 1 — 9
Myrtille Gougat	Salomé Bouley	season 3 — 9
Martin and Louis Launay	Kim Lepic	season 7 — 9

=== Supporting characters ===
Actor/Actress	Characters	Seasons
Olivier Perrier	Denis' father	season 1 — 7
Dominique MacAvoy	Solange, Denis' mother	season 1 — 7
Cécile Rebboah	Corinne, Valérie's best friend	season 2 — 9
André Manoukian	Thierry Kalamian, Valérie's former husband, Tiphaine's father	season 2 — 9
Augustin Ruhabura	Priest	season 2 — 3
Norbert Ferrer	Manu, server	season 2 — 3, 7
Pierre Vernier	Jean Lepic, Renaud's father	season 3 — 6
Hélène Vincent (season 3); Claire Nadeau season 6	Marie-Françoise Lepic, Renaud's mother	season 3 — 6
Isabelle Nanty	Christiane Potin	season 3 — 9
Zakariya Gouram	Malek Benhassi, Renaud's senior	season 3 — 5
Vincent Winterhalter	Jean-Claude, Sèvres mayor	season 3 — 7
Eva Darlan	Monique, Valérie's mother	season 3 — 8
Muriel Combeau	Samantha, Valérie's senior	season 3 — 6
Frédérique Bel	Tatiana Lenoir	season 4 — 6
Patricia Franchino	Marie-Annick, Renaud's sister	season 4 — 6
Claire Magnin	Gisèle, Fabienne's colleague and friend	season 4 — 7
Corinne Masiero	Solange, Fabienne's sister	season 4 — 8 present
Stéphane de Groodt	Pierre-Henrik Delage, head hunter	season 6 — 7
Stéphan Wojtowicz	Jean-Pierre, editor-in-chief of Télé Hauts-de-Seine	season 6 — 7
Benoît Michel	F-X, Soline's boyfriend	season 6 — 9

=== Guest actors ===
- Anne Benoît as Andrée (2 episodes)
- Arielle Dombasle as Herself (1 episode)
- Arnaud Ducret as Michel (1 episode)
- Catherine Benguigui as The ANPE employee (1 episode)
- Charlie Dupont as Loïc Leguédec (2 episodes)
- Émilie Gavois-Kahn as Mika (1 episode)
- François Morel as Monsieur Ballud (1 episode)
- Helena Noguerra as Child psychiatrist (3 episodes)
- Lannick Gautry as Benoit (1 episode)
- Lionel Abelanski as The gynecologist (1 episode)
- Marie-Christine Adam as The owner (1 episode)
- Marie-Hélène Lentini as Madame Descato (2 episodes)
- Michaël Abiteboul as Pedro (1 episode)
- Naveen Polishetty as Rushik Sanghvi (2 episodes)
- Jean-Baptiste Shelmerdine as Olaf (1 episode)
- Philippe Nahon as Gérard (1 episode)
- Sophie Mounicot as Madame Didier (1 episode)
- Sylvie Testud as Sylviane Chinsky (1 episode)

== Media adaptations ==
The TV show was adapted into a comic book by Philippe Bercovici and Dal.
