= Monsieur Papa =

Monsieur Papa may refer to:

- Monsieur Papa (2011 film), a French film
- Monsieur Papa (1977 film), a French comedy film
