= Tuch =

Tuch or tuches may refer to:

- Tuch, a Yiddish term for the human buttocks.
- Alex Tuch (born 1996), American ice hockey player
- Johann Christian Friedrich Tuch (1806–1867), German Orientalist and theologian
- Luke Tuch (born 2002), American ice hockey player
- Walter Tuch (1913–1969), American cinematographer
- Das Indische Tuch, a 1963 West German crime film directed by Alfred Vohrer
- Professor Tuch, pseudonym of Bruno Zach (1891–1945), Ukrainian-born Austrian art deco sculptor
- Jane Tilden (1910–2002), born Marianne Tuch, Austrian actress

== See also ==
- Les Tuche (disambiguation)
- Bum (disambiguation)
