= Ralph Amoussou =

French actor (born 1989)

- Born: Nick Ralph Amoussou; 3 May 1989 (age 37); Paris, France
- Education: Susan Batson Studio
- Occupation: Actor
- Years active: 2006–present

Nick Ralph Amoussou (born 3 May 1989) is a French actor. He is known for his roles such as Séby on the Netflix series Marianne (2019), Samuel Becker on the OCS series Missions (2019–2021), Paul on the Netflix series Transatlantic (2023), and the musketeer Hannibal in the film The Three Musketeers: Milady (2023). For his performance in the 2008 film With a Little Help from Myself, he was nominated for a César Award for Most Promising Actor.

== Early life ==
Amoussou was born in Paris and raised in Benin and Nigeria until he was twelve years old. His mother named him after American civil rights activist Ralph Abernathy and American writer Ralph Ellison. His maternal grandmother is an Ethiopian Jew, and his maternal grandfather is from the former Kingdom of Dahomey, in present-day Benin.

Amoussou started acting as a teenager and landed his first role at fifteen. He trained at the Susan Batson Studio in New York.

Amoussou grew up bilingual, speaking French and English.

== Career ==
His performance in the 2008 film With a Little Help from Myself earned him a nomination for Most Promising Actor at the 34th César Awards.

In 2016 he appeared in the short Victorine starring alongside Claudia Tagbo. The film, directed by Garance Meillon and writted by Christophe Martinolli, was initially broadcast on TV5Monde.

In 2019, he played Séby on the Netflix horror series Marianne.

Between 2019 and 2021, he played the astronaut Samuel Becker in the French science-fiction television series Missions, broadcast by OCS.

In 2023, he starred as hotel concierge Paul Kandjo on the Netflix series Transatlantic, and had a supporting role in the French television series Split, directed by Iris Brey. Amoussou also appeared in a re-telling of the classic Alexandre Dumas novel The Three Musketeers; the French film The Three Musketeers: Milady, where he played Hannibal, based on the true story of Louis Aniaba, the prince of Assinie and the first Black musketeer.

== Filmography ==
=== Feature films ===
Key
†	Denotes films that have not yet been released

Year	Title	Role	Notes
2006	Les enfants du pays	Bha	
2008	With a Little Help from Myself	Victor	
2009	Omar	Omar	Short film
2010	Black Venus	Harry	
2011	15 Lads (Nos résistances)	L'ours	
2011	L'Attaque	Mouss	Short film
2011	Hasaki Ya Suda	Daigo	Short film
2011	Les Tuche	Georges Diouf	
2011	Early One Morning	Youssef	
2011	Les Mythos	Moussa	
2011	Will	Serge	
2012	Diaz – Don't Clean Up This Blood	Etienne	
2012	In a Rush	Louis	
2012	Un beau matin	Prince Oscar	Short film
2012	Victorine	Oscar	Short film
2012	Goodbye Morocco	Gabriel	
2013	Intercourses		Short film
2013	In Seventh Heaven	Jean-Jacques	Short film
2013	The Dream Kids	El Malah	
2013	Under the Starry Sky	Tyler / Thierno	
2016	Les Tuche 2: The American Dream	Georges Diouf	
2016	La fine équipe	Gaëtan / Marlon	
2017	Chateau	Julius	
2017	Par instinct	Tony	
2018	Les Tuche 3	Georges Diouf	
2018	The Terrible Tale of Henrietta Tate	London Pink	Short film
2021	Hajimé	Cyril	Short film
2021	Les Tuche 4	Diouf	
2021	L'Enfant et la Nuit	Man	Short film
2023	Le prix du passage	Asim	
2023	The Three Musketeers: Milady	Hannibal	

=== Television ===
Key
†	Denotes works that have not yet been released

Year	Title	Role	Notes
2007	L'embrasement	Bouna	TV film
2007	La commune	Housmane Daoud	TV Series; 2 episodes
2007–2008	Merci, les enfants vont bien!	Mao	TV Series; 3 episodes
2008	P.J.		TV Series; 1 episode
2012	Toussaint Louverture	Young Isaac	Miniseries; 2 episodes
2013	Death in the Shadow of State	Jackson Odhiambo	TV film
2014	Détectives	Pacôme Traoré	TV Series; 1 episode
2017	Man Like Mobeen	Stephan	TV Series; 1 episode
2019	Marianne	Séby	TV Series; 8 episodes
2019–2021	Missions	Samuel Becker	TV Series; 12 episodes
2020	Capitaine Marleau	Théodore Sempé	TV Series; 1 episode
2023	Transatlantic	Paul	TV Series; 7 episodes
2023	Split	Natan	TV Series

== Awards and nominations ==
Year	Award	Category	Work	Result	Ref.
2009	César Awards	Best Supporting Actor	With a Little Help from Myself	Nominated	
