= Isabelle Gélinas =

French-Canadian actress (born 1963)

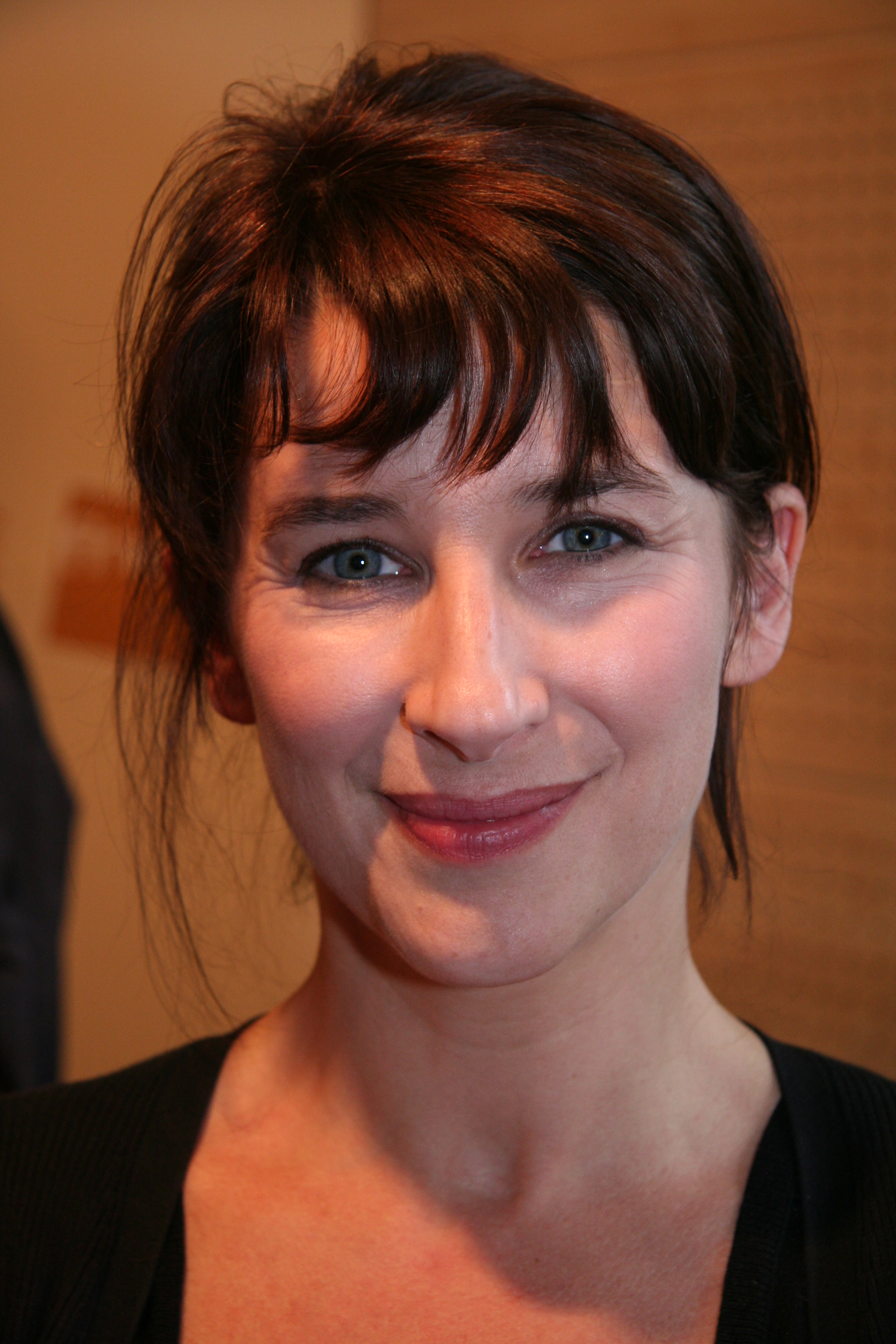
- Isabelle Gélinas in May 2007.
- Born: October 13, 1963 (age 63); Montreal, Quebec
- Occupation: Actress
- Years active: 1986–present
- Television: Fais pas ci, fais pas ça

Isabelle Gélinas (French: [izabɛl ʒelinas]; born October 13, 1963) is a French-Canadian actress.

== Early life and training ==
Isabelle Gélinas was born in Montreal, Quebec. She began her training course at the Cours Florent before joining the CNSAD where she took classes with teachers such as Pierre Vial, Daniel Mesguich and especially Michel Bouquet. Her beginnings in the occupation were not without difficulties, and she was often qualified as "too young", "too mature" and even "not modern enough". She had a hard time finding her place in the acting field. She began her career (1982–86) in the theater, playing in several dramas of Molière with Jean Davy as the director.

== Career ==
In 1986, her participation in the short film Triple sec with Suzanne Flon and André Dussollier gave her the opportunity to begin a film career. She had a real change in 1988 when she was featured in the comedy film Suivez cet avion (1989) with Lambert Wilson and in the drama film Chouans! (1988) with Philippe Noiret. She also began at the same time a television career featuring in several films mostly directed by Caroline Huppert. She then played in the drama films Mado poste restante (1989), Louis, the Child King (1992), Drôles d'oiseaux (1993), and in the comedy films À l'heure où les grands fauves vont boire (1993) and Regarde-moi quand je te quitte (1993). At the second part of the decade, she featured in two successful films playing supporting roles: Didier (1997) with Jean-Pierre Bacri and Alain Chabat, and Paparazzi (1998) with Vincent Lindon and Patrick Timsit. She played in television films of different fields such as Moi, Général de Gaulle (1990), J'ai deux amours (1996) and Chaos technique (1997).

The following decade, she played in a few comedy films such as Les gens en maillot de bain ne sont pas (forcément) superficiels (2001), Ne quittez pas (2003), Cherche fiancé tous frais payés (2005) and Ça se soigne ? (2008). She has focused her career on television and theater, including many television fictions like Le Piège du Père Noël (2005), the trilogy of Inséparables (2005–06) with Michel Boujenah, but also Frappes interdites (2005) and Passés troubles (2006). She plays since 2007 one of the main roles in the comedy series Fais pas ci, fais pas ça.

== Selected filmography ==
Year	Title	Role	Notes
1990	Mado, poste restante	Germena	
1991	Mountain of Diamonds	Centaine	
1993	Louis, the Child King	Duchesse de Châtillon	
1997	Didier	Maria	
1998	Paparazzi	Sandra	
2010	The Round Up	Hélène Timonier	
2015	Entre amis	Carole	
2015	The Very Private Life of Mister Sim	Caroline	
