= RRRrrrr!!! =

2004 French comedy film

- Theatrical release poster
- Directed by: Alain Chabat
- Written by: Maurice Barthélemy; Marina Foïs; Pierre-François Martin-Laval; Jean-Paul Rouve; Alain Chabat
- Produced by: Alain Chabat; Patrick Bordier
- Starring: Alain Chabat; Maurice Barthélemy; Marina Foïs; Elise Larnicol; Pierre-François Martin-Laval; Jean-Paul Rouve; Pascal Vincent; Jean Rochefort; Gérard Depardieu
- Narrated by: Olivier Baroux
- Cinematography: Laurent Dailland
- Edited by: Juliette Welfling
- Music by: Frédéric Talgorn
- Production companies: Chez Wam; StudioCanal; TF1 Films Production; Les Robins des Bois Airlines
- Distributed by: Mars Distribution
- Release date: 28 January 2004
- Running time: 98 minutes
- Country: France
- Language: French
- Budget: $17.91 million
- Box office: $13.33 million

RRRrrrr!!! is a 2004 French comedy film, co-written, produced and directed by Alain Chabat. It stars Maurice Barthélémy, Pierre-François Martin-Laval, Jean-Paul Rouve, Marina Foïs, Elise Larnicol, Alain Chabat, Pascal Vincent, Jean Rochefort and Gérard Depardieu. The film was a box office bomb.

== Plot ==
35,000 years ago, in the Stone Age, two neighbouring tribes lived in peace. The Tribe of Clean Hair was peaceful, due to its possession of the shampoo formula. The Tribe of Dirty Hair was at odds with the Tribe of Clean Hair due to this, and their leader wished for access to the formula of shampoo.

The leader of the Dirty Hair tribe decides to send a spy to steal the recipe. But a far more serious event would upset the life of Clean Hair tribe; for the first time in the history of humanity, a murder had been committed.

The tribes begin the first criminal investigation in human history.

== Cast ==
- Maurice Barthélemy as Pierre, the leader of the Clean Hair Tribe
- Jean-Paul Rouve as Pierre, the blond
- Pierre-François Martin-Laval as Pierre, the tuft
- Elise Larnicol as Pierre, leader's wife
- Pascal Vincent as Pierre, the night crier "préveneur"
- Alain Chabat as Pierre, the healer (French: "le guérissologue")
- Gérard Depardieu as Tonton, the new leader of the Dirty Hair Tribe
- Marina Foïs as Guy
- Sébastien Thiéry as Pierre the archeologic excavator, the "fouillologue"
- Damien Jouillerot as Trapper 1
- Samir Guesmi as Trapper 2
- Cyril Casmèze as Tonton, the mute Dirty Hair
- Jean Rochefort as Lucie, the leader of the Dirty Hair Tribe
- Dominique Farrugia as the cudgel maker "gourdinier"
- Joeystarr as the cudgel tester "L'essayeur de gourdins"
- Cheikna Sankare as the cudgel practice target "L'essayé de gourdins"
- Valérie Lemercier as Pierre, couture guitar's teacher
- Maroussia Dubreuil as Pierre, couture guitar's student
- Gilles David as Pierre, the too great 1
- Jean-Paul Bonnaire as Pierre, the too great 2
- Édith Le Merdy as Pierre, the blond's mother
- Bernard Cheron as Pierre, the blond's father
- Xavier Maly as Pierre
- Dominique Besnehard as Pierre
- Juliette Poissonnier as Pierre, the babysitter "gardeuse"
- Olivier Baroux as the Narrator
- Jessy Sylvain as Pierre très propre

== Release dates ==
Country	Title	Date
Belgium	RRRrrrr!!!	28 January 2004
France	RRRrrrr!!!	28 January 2004
Turkey	RRRrrrr!!!	4 June 2004
Slovenia		10 June 2004
Netherlands	RRRrrrr!!!	1 July 2004
Greece	Grrrrr!!! Proistorika eglimata	23 July 2004
Poland	RRRrrrr!!!	23 July 2004
United Arab Emirates		1 September 2004
Czech Republic	RRRrrrr!!!	23 September 2004
Portugal		30 September 2004
Thailand	อาร์ร์ร์! ไข่ซ่าส์! โลกา...ก๊าก!!	2 December 2004
Brazil	RRRrrrr!!! Na Idade da Pedra	16 December 2005
Spain	¡¡¡Caverrrrnícola!!!	18 August 2006
Russia	Миллион лет до нашей эры (One Million Years B.C)	2004
