= Let's Be Friends (film) =

- Directed by: Éric Toledano; Olivier Nakache
- Written by: Éric Toledano; Olivier Nakache
- Produced by: Bruno Chiche; Nicolas Duval Adassovsky; Manuel Alduy
- Starring: Jean-Paul Rouve; Gérard Depardieu
- Cinematography: Pascal Ridao
- Edited by: Dorian Rigal-Ansous
- Music by: Bruno Coulais
- Production companies: Yumé; Quad Productions
- Distributed by: Mars Distribution
- Release date: 23 February 2005
- Running time: 100 minutes
- Country: France
- Languages: French; Mandarin; Spanish; English
- Budget: $5.3 million
- Box office: $2.5 million

Let's Be Friends (French: Je préfère qu'on reste amis...) is a 2005 French film directed and written by Éric Toledano and Olivier Nakache.

== Synopsis ==
Thirty-year-old computer scientist, physicist, bachelor, sickly shy and hypochondriac, Claude Mandelbaum leads a life all the more dull that his last, and only, love story goes back two years. One day, on the occasion of the marriage of his best friend, Daniel, he meets Serge, a divorced fifty-year-old who takes full advantage of his celibacy by chaining the adventures. Shortly after, on the advice of Daniel, Claude resolved to make an appointment in a marriage agency of a particular kind, where it is the women who contact the men. In the waiting room, he falls face to face with Serge, who invites him to have a drink in his home ...

== Cast ==
- Jean-Paul Rouve as Claude Mendelbaum
- Gérard Depardieu as Serge
- Annie Girardot as Madame Mendelbaum
- Lionel Abelanski as Daniel
- Isabelle Renauld as Sophie
- Yves Jacques as Germain
- Valérie Benguigui as Eva
- Jonathan Lambert as Totof
- Élisabeth Vitali as Véronique
- Xavier De Guillebon as Philippe
- Mar Sodupe as Julia Marquez
- Flore Grimaud as Sylvie
- Caroline Frank as Manon
- Tilly Mandelbrot as Pauline
- Cassandra Harrouche as Justine
- Virginie Caliari as Barbara
- Mimi Félixine as Latifah
- Thierry Godard as Mathias
- Frédéric Maranber as Jean-Mi
- Jacqueline Staup as Tata Muguette
- Catherine Hosmalin as Woman speed dating

== Production ==
The majority of the film was shot in Paris. A few scenes were shot place in Manhattan and Brooklyn. Another sequence was shot in Troyes (Aube).

== See also ==
- 2005 in film
