= Théo Fernandez =

French actor (born 1998)

- Born: 18 September 1998 (age 26); Toulouse, France
- Occupation: Actor

Théo Fernandez (born 18 September 1998) is a French actor. He is best known for playing the role of Donald Tuche in Les Tuche (2011), Les Tuche 2 : Le rêve américain (2016), Les Tuche 3 : Liberté, Égalité, Fraternituche (2018), Les Tuche 4 (2021) and God Save the Tuche (2025). He plays the lead role of Gaston in the 2018 film Gaston Lagaffe, the main character in the comics Gaston created by the Belgian cartoonist André Franquin. Fernandez has also appeared in a number of TV films and TV series.
