= F.B.I. Frog Butthead Investigators =

French–Belgian comedy film

- Film poster
- French: Mais qui a re-tué Pamela Rose?
- Directed by: Kad Merad; Olivier Baroux
- Written by: Kad Merad; Olivier Baroux; Julien Rappeneau
- Produced by: Cyril Colbeau-Justin; Jean-Baptiste Dupont
- Starring: Kad Merad; Olivier Baroux; Audrey Fleurot; Omar Sy; Laurent Lafitte; Guy Lecluyse
- Cinematography: Régis Blondeau
- Music by: Hervé Rakotofiringa
- Production companies: LGM Cinéma; Gaumont; Nexus Factory uFilm; SPAD Films
- Distributed by: Gaumont
- Release date: 5 December 2012
- Running time: 1h 30min
- Countries: France; Belgium
- Language: French
- Budget: $12 million
- Box office: $2.4 million

F.B.I. Frog Butthead Investigators (French: Mais qui a re-tué Pamela Rose?; lit. 'But who killed Pamela Rose again?') is a 2012 French–Belgian comedy film written and directed by Kad Merad and Olivier Baroux, sequel of the movie "Mais qui a tué Pamela Rose?"(2003), followed by "Bullit & Riper" (2020).

== Cast ==
- Kad Merad as Richard Bullit
- Olivier Baroux as Douglas Riper
- Omar Sy as Mosby
- Laurent Lafitte as Perkins
- Audrey Fleurot as The President
- Guy Lecluyse as Kowachek
- Philippe Lefebvre as Commandant de bord
- Laurence Arné as Linda
- Xavier Letourneur as Donuts
- Alain Doutey as The French President
- Lionel Abelanski as Le lieutenel
- Patrick Bosso as Le mari de la stagiaire de Riper
- François Morel as The tunnel man
