= Entre amis =

- Film poster
- Directed by: Olivier Baroux
- Written by: Éric Besnard; Richard Grandpierre; Olivier Baroux
- Produced by: Richard Grandpierre
- Starring: Daniel Auteuil; Gérard Jugnot; François Berléand; Zabou Breitman; Mélanie Doutey; Isabelle Gélinas
- Cinematography: Régis Blondeau
- Edited by: Christophe Pinel
- Music by: Martin Rappeneau
- Production companies: Eskwad; Pathé; TF1 Films Production; Malec Productions
- Distributed by: Pathé
- Release date: 22 April 2015
- Running time: 95 minutes
- Country: France
- Language: French
- Budget: $12.6 million
- Box office: $9.3 million

Entre amis is a 2015 French comedy film directed by Olivier Baroux. The film features an ensemble cast that includes Daniel Auteuil, Gérard Jugnot, François Berléand, Zabou Breitman, Mélanie Doutey and Isabelle Gélinas. It was released by Pathé on 22 April 2015.

== Cast ==
- Daniel Auteuil as Richard
- Gérard Jugnot as Gilles
- François Berléand as Philippe
- Zabou Breitman as Astrid
- Mélanie Doutey as Daphnée
- Isabelle Gélinas as Carole
- Justine Bruneau de la Salle as Cathalina
- Jean-Philippe Ricci as Battistou
