= Marseille (2016 film) =

- Theatrical release poster
- Directed by: Kad Merad
- Written by: Kad Merad; Patrick Bosso; Judith El Zein
- Produced by: Cyril Colbeau-Justin; Jean-Baptiste Dupont; Richard Grandpierre
- Starring: Kad Merad; Patrick Bosso
- Cinematography: Gordon Spooner
- Edited by: Marie Silvi
- Music by: Hervé Rakotofiringa
- Distributed by: Pathé
- Release dates: 16 January 2016 (Alpe d'Huez); 16 March 2016 (France)
- Running time: 102 minutes
- Country: France
- Language: French
- Budget: $5.9 million
- Box office: $5.1 million

Marseille is a French film directed by Kad Merad, released in 2016. In the film, a man returns to his hometown of Marseille after 25 years of living abroad. He finds that the city has changed.

== Plot ==
Paolo, who left Marseille for Canada after a tragedy, has to return 25 years later when his brother, Joseph, tells him that their father had an accident. Determined to make a brief return, Paolo will realize that the city of Marseille is not the one that he believes ...

== Cast ==
- Kad Merad as Paolo
- Patrick Bosso as Joseph
- Venantino Venantini as Giovanni
- Judith El Zein as Elena
- Anne Charrier as Valérie
- Louis-Do de Lencquesaing as Stéphane
- Julien Boisselier as Pierre
- Philippe Lefebvre as The CTC Director
- Mathieu Madénian as The butler
- Basile Boli as himself
