= Thierry Bizot =

French television producer and author

- Born: May 12, 1962 (age 63)
- Occupation(s): Television producer, author
- Spouse: Anne Giafferi

Thierry Bizot (born 12 May 1962) is a French television producer and Roman Catholic author. He co-produced Fais pas ci, fais pas ça with his wife, Anne Giafferi.

== Biography ==
He is the grandson of Jean-Jacques Bizot, Deputy Governor of the Banque de France, and the nephew of Jacques de Larosière, Governor of the Bank of France. He is married to film director and screenwriter Anne Giafferi.

A student at the Lycée Henri-IV and a graduate of ESSEC in 1984, he joined L'Oréal in 1986, becoming Marketing Director and General Manager of L'Oréal Parfumerie in Belgium.

In 1995, he joined M6 as director of entertainment and magazines. He launched several music programs, including Flashback,Graines de star, Fan de, Hit Machine, Plus vite que la musique..., as well as the M6 Music channel.

In 1999, together with Emmanuel Chain, he founded the production company Éléphant et Cie, of which he is Managing Director. He became joint managing director of Groupe Éléphant in 2006.

He is a columnist on Ça balance à Paris.

Converted to Catholicism in 2007, he published his autobiographical story Catholique anonyme in 2008, adapted for the screen by his wife Anne Giafferi under the title Qui a envie d'être aimé? in 2010.

== Works ==
- Ambition & Cie, Paris: Le grand livre du mois, 2002
- Nous n'irons plus chez elle, Paris: éditions du Seuil, 1987
- Catholique anonyme, Paris: éditions du Seuil, 2008
- Tout à coup, le silence, Paris: éditions du Seuil, 2010
- Sauf miracle, bien sûr, Paris: éditions du Seuil, 2013
- Premiers pas d'un apprenti chrétien, Paris: éditions Bayard, 2013
- Par ordre d'apparition, Paris: éditions du Seuil, 2016
