= Patrick Bosso =

French comedian and actor (born 1962)

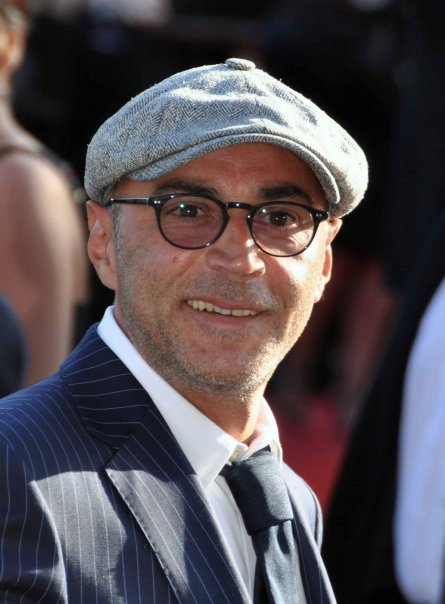
- Born: 12 October 1962 (age 63); Marseille, France
- Occupation: Actor
- Years active: 1996-present
- Partner: Rebecca Hampton (2004–2006)

Patrick Bosso (born 12 October 1962) is a French comedian and actor. He appeared in more than twenty films since 1996.

== Filmography ==
Year	Title	Role	Notes
1997	Didier	Spectator in stadium's tribune	Uncredited
1998	(G)rève party		
1998	Comme une bête	Neighbour	
1999	Les collègues	José	
2001	La grande vie!	L'ange fonctionnaire	
2008	Bienvenue chez les Ch'tis	Policeman on A7	
2008	The Easy Way	Le truand #1	
2008	A Man and His Dog	Homme tramway	
2011	A Filha do Pai	Le garçon	
2012	Cassos	Patron du bar	
2012	F.B.I. Frog Butthead Investigators		
2016	Marseille	Joseph	
2016	Back to Mom's	Michel, conseiller Pôle Emploi	
2018	O genro da minha vida	Le voisin	
