= Mes héros =

- Film poster
- Directed by: Éric Besnard
- Written by: Éric Besnard
- Produced by: Richard Grandpierre; Romain Le Grand; Josiane Balasko; Frédéric Doniguian; Vivien Aslanian
- Starring: Josiane Balasko; Gérard Jugnot; Clovis Cornillac; Pierre Richard
- Cinematography: Jean-Marie Dreujou
- Edited by: Christophe Pinel
- Music by: Christophe Julien
- Production company: Eskwad
- Distributed by: Pathé
- Release date: 12 December 2012
- Running time: 97 minutes
- Country: France
- Language: French
- Budget: $8.5 million
- Box office: $4.9 million

Mes héros (lit. 'My heroes') is a 2012 French comedy-drama film, directed by Éric Besnard.

In the film, a businessman with ongoing occupational and marital troubles travels to Bordeaux to get his mother out of jail. Deciding to stay with his parents for a few days, he notices their loving relationship. He starts viewing his parents as role models on how to deal to overcome his own problems.

== Plot ==
Maxime is the overwhelmed boss of an ambulance company. Deceived by his wife, he refuses to forgive her, then learns that his mother Olga, a woman of strong character who refuses submission and to accept the world as it is, is in custody after defending another woman in a brawl.

Maxime travels to Bordeaux to get her out of jail. Olga tells Maxime that his father Jacques' medical reports are not looking good. On the way back home, Olga diverts the route to rescue the black boy Tiemoko, son of an African deportee without papers, to hide in their home away from authorities.

Maxime takes the opportunity to spend a few days with his parents, away from his occupational and marital troubles. Despite the quarrels of his parents, he sees his mother's concern for his father. The father is jovial and enjoys good wine and cigarettes banned by his wife. Maxime wishes for the same mutual affection for his own marriage. The son rediscovers the feelings of love and generosity between his parents, his "heroes" who provide a role model with which to overcome his own problems. The small Tiemoko just cements this family relations.

== Cast ==
- Josiane Balasko as Olga
- Gérard Jugnot as Jacques
- Clovis Cornillac as Maxime
- Pierre Richard as Jean
- Ibrahim Burama Darboe as Tiemoko
- Anne Charrier as Stéphanie
- Michelle Goddet as Nicole
- Magaly Berdy as Sally
- Michel Masiero as Roger
- Constance Dollé as Isabelle
- Sarah Suco as The waitress

== Production ==
This movie is the reunion between the two members of Le Splendid, Josiane Balasko and Gérard Jugnot.
