= Early One Morning (film) =

2011 film

- Film poster
- Directed by: Jean-Marc Moutout
- Written by: Sophie Fillières; Olivier Gorce; Jean-Marc Moutout
- Produced by: Margaret Ménégoz; Régine Vial
- Starring: Jean-Pierre Darroussin
- Cinematography: Pierric Gantelmi d'Ille
- Edited by: Marie Da Costa
- Distributed by: Les Films du Losange (France)
- Release date: 5 October 2011
- Running time: 91 minutes
- Countries: France; Belgium
- Language: French
- Budget: €3.7 million
- Box office: $413,944

Early One Morning (French: De bon matin) is a 2011 French-Belgian drama film directed by Jean-Marc Moutout.

== Cast ==
- Jean-Pierre Darroussin as Paul
- Valérie Dréville as Françoise
- Xavier Beauvois as Alain Fisher
- Yannick Renier as Fabrice Van Listeich
- Laurent Delbecque as Benoît
- Ralph Amoussou as Youssef
- Aladin Reibel as Antoine
- Pierre Aussedat as Foucade
- François Chattot as Lancelin
- Nelly Antignac as Clarisse
- Frédéric Leidgens as Doctor Hogard
- Jacques Bonnaffé as The phone friend
