= Orchestra Class =

2017 French film

- Official poster
- Directed by: Rachid Hami
- Screenplay by: Guy Laurent; Valerie Zenatti; Rachid Hami
- Produced by: Nicolas Mauvernay
- Starring: Kad Merad
- Cinematography: Jerome Almeras
- Edited by: Joelle Hache
- Music by: Bruno Coulais
- Production companies: Mizar Films; UGC, France 2 Cinema; Cite de la musique — Philharmonie de Paris
- Distributed by: UGC
- Release date: 8 November 2017
- Running time: 102 minutes
- Country: France
- Language: French

Orchestra Class (French: La Melodie) is a 2017 French film directed by Rachid Hami and starring Kad Merad. The film was screened at the Venice Film Festival and the Dubai International Film Festival.

== Cast ==
- Kad Merad as Simon Daoud
- Samir Guesmi as Farid
- Renely Alfred as Arnold
- Tatjana Rojo as Arnold's mother

== Reception ==
A critic from The Hollywood Reporter wrote that "But the film’s few, more lived-in moments often involve secondary characters with no story arc of their own, so they never feel properly integrated into the fabric of the otherwise very formatted plot". A critic from Screen International wrote that "The raucous energy that the youngsters offer gives Orchestra Class (La Melodie) a gritty sense of momentum". A critic from RFI wrote that "Alfred Renély is a touching and convincing young prodigy supported by a whole bunch of promising French film actors".
