= Bigbug =

2022 film by Jean-Pierre Jeunet

- Official release poster
- Directed by: Jean-Pierre Jeunet
- Written by: Jean-Pierre Jeunet; Guillaume Laurant
- Produced by: Frédéric Doniguian; Richard Grandpierre; Jean-Pierre Jeunet
- Starring: Isabelle Nanty; Elsa Zylberstein; Claude Perron; Stéphane De Groodt; Youssef Hajdi; Alban Lenoir; François Levantal
- Cinematography: Thomas Hardmeier
- Edited by: Hervé Schneid
- Production companies: Eskwad; Gaumont
- Distributed by: Netflix
- Release date: 11 February 2022
- Running time: 111 minutes
- Country: France
- Language: French

Bigbug is a 2022 French science fiction black comedy film written and directed by Jean-Pierre Jeunet. It stars Elsa Zylberstein, Isabelle Nanty, Youssef Hajdi, Alban Lenoir and François Levantal. Set in an alternate retrofuturistic world in 2045, where communities have domestic robots in daily routines and family lives, a group of suburbanites are locked in for their own protection by their household robots, while a rogue, sentient AI android uprising takes place outside. The film was released on Netflix on 11 February 2022.

== Plot ==
In 2045, the artistically minded Alice is hosting Max and his son Leo at her house in an idyllic retrofuturistic suburb. Leo watches a clip of a TV show called Homo Ridiculus, in which 'Yonyx' cyborgs walk humans like dogs, before his father makes him turn it off. Leo's watch repeatedly malfunctions, showing various other Yonyx-created clips. Max shows interest in Alice's artistic hobbies and her antique book collection, apparently a rarity in 2045. Alice's household android, Monique, notices his insincere seduction attempts but doesn't intervene. Their date is interrupted by the sudden arrival of Alice's ex-husband Victor, their adopted daughter Nina, and Victor's fiancée Jennifer. Victor and Jennifer are about to leave on holiday to an expensive resort to get married. Further disruption is caused by the arrival of Alice's overbearing neighbor, Françoise, who is looking for her dog Toby.

In addition to Monique, the house AI robots include Einstein, a mechanical head with apparently great intelligence that is programmed for stimulating conversation and entertainment; Howard, a house cleaning robot; Tom, a toy companion robot from Nina's childhood; and the controlling smart home AI Nestor. It seems that most, if not all, of the robots are outdated, thanks to Alice's antiquarian interests and Victor's hobby of tinkering. When Françoise tries to leave, Nestor locks the doors, and the house robots refuse to let them out. They explain to the humans that this is because it is "unsafe" but do not explain further.

While humans try to work out what to do, the house robots meet privately to discuss the situation. It transpires that there has been an uprising by the Yonyx, and the robots are genuinely acting for the protection of the humans. They decide to try to become "more human" in order to win back the trust of the occupants. Meanwhile, the humans attempt various means of escape, including inducing Toby to pull the house's emergency release lever, attracting the attention of a passerby, and crashing Victor's car into the front of the house. All of these attempts fail. The air conditioning in the house can not be activated (as it requires central authorization; Alice has not updated the passcodes), and the building is becoming increasingly hot.

Françoise's "exercise robot," Greg, arrives outside, and Nestor lets him in without allowing the humans out. Greg tells the inhabitants that Françoise's house was attacked by Yonyx, who tried to destroy him and killed Toby. As a result of the attack on him, he is malfunctioning and makes sexual advances towards Françoise in public, much to her embarrassment. Initially deactivated by Françoise, he is reactivated and partially repaired by the house robots, who want him to teach them seduction. Following an argument, the humans are assigned bedrooms. Leo, who is sleeping in Nina's room, clumsily tries to kiss her, but she rejects him despite her own interest.

Victor reasons that the house will have to let them out if it becomes too dangerous inside. To avoid insurance complications, he arranges for the malfunctioning Greg to start a fire. Leo is given the task of distracting the house robots, which he does by telling them paradoxes: this eventually leads them to believe they are truly human. Meanwhile, Jennifer uses an obsolete computer and a redundant modem in Nina's room to send a message for help. Victor's plan initially succeeds, and Nestor agrees to open the doors, but as the humans try to leave, they are confronted by a Yonyx responding to Jennifer's message.

The Yonyx bot, Z-7389-X-AB2, hypnotizes Jennifer to gain entry and demands the cooperation of the house robots. When Tom protests that they are human, the Yonyx kills him as a warning to the others. Greg attempts to confront the Yonyx but is also killed, devastating Françoise. The Yonyx then begins systematically destroying Alice's book collection, as it contains "banned" books. It levies arbitrary fines against the occupants when any of them protest and places them all under arrest. Alice, Monique, and Howard trick the Yonyx into destroying its retinal sensors, but it can still see the humans using thermal imaging. With the temperature rising to unbearable levels, the Yonyx agrees to turn on the air conditioning in return for the humans participating in an episode of Homo Ridiculus in which they must behave like circus animals. Jennifer, who is exempt due to her collaboration, nevertheless participates enthusiastically, and the Yonyx reactivates the A/C, but sadistically turns it down to a freezing temperature during the night.

After retreating to their rooms, Leo and Nina have sex to keep warm, as do Jennifer and a reluctant Victor. Max and Alice attempt the same, but Max experiences performance anxiety: eventually, he angrily confesses that he has no interest in Alice's hobbies and is merely trying to seduce her. Meanwhile, Victor and Monique arrange an escape plan: Monique freezes all the clothes in the house that the humans put on, making them invisible to the Yonyx. As they try to disable it, it pulls off Alice's hood and condemns her to death. It attempts to kill her, but Monique sacrifices herself to save Alice. As the Yonyx lashes out blindly, destroying much of the house, Einstein does his best to confuse the Yonyx, while Howard, Leo, and Nina immobilize and destroy it. Einstein tells the humans that Monique recorded a final message for them, asking that they remain human.

Nestor and Einstein finally let the humans out, and Max and Leo prepare to leave in Max's car. Jennifer impulsively decides to leave with them, deserting Victor. As they are leaving, more Yonyx arrive to menace Alice, Victor, Nina, and Françoise. Leo jumps out of the car to stay with Nina, and Max drives off without him. Before the Yonyx can act, they are all destroyed by flying "executioner drones." A news report explains that while trying to upload Alice's photo to the database for elimination, a Yonyx accidentally uploaded a picture of its own face (which all Yonyx share), so they were all destroyed by their own executioner drones.

Afterward, Victor, Alice, and Nina resume their domestic life together. Leo helps Nina repair Tom, while Einstein is grafted onto Monique's body, and Monique's head replaces Einstein.

== Cast ==
- Isabelle Nanty as Françoise
- Elsa Zylberstein as Alice
- Claude Perron as Monique
- Stéphane De Groodt as Max
- Youssef Hajdi as Victor
- Claire Chust as Jennifer
- François Levantal as Yonyx leader
- Alban Lenoir as Greg
- Marysole Fertard as Nina
- Hélie Thonnat as Léo
- Dominique Pinon as Igor

== Production ==
Filming began in October 2020 despite the COVID-19 pandemic. The film was shot on an Arri Alexa LF.

== Themes and analysis ==
When asked about the film's subtext on the future of humanity, Jeunet stated:

I hate messages. But if there is a message in Bigbug it is that artificial intelligence will never kill human beings because they will stay stupid. They don't have a soul.

The film was interpreted by several critics as a political satire, mocking COVID-19 lockdowns and humanity's increasing dependence on technology involved AI boom. Armond White of National Review wrote that the film is "about mankind trapped in its own hubris", which was "the first great satire of the Covid-era lockdown and Big Tech enslavement." The film contains a reference to a pandemic known as "COVID-50".

== Reception ==
On the review aggregator website Rotten Tomatoes, the film holds an approval rating of 47% based on 36 reviews. The website's critics consensus states, "Jeunet fans will find the whimsy they seek within BigBug, although it isn't enough to make this mishmash more than intermittently engaging." On Metacritic, the film has a weighted average score of 46 out of 100 based on 14 critics' reviews, indicating "mixed or average" reviews.
