= Paparazzi (1998 French film) =

- Directed by: Alain Berbérian
- Written by: Alain Berbérian; Jean-François Halin; Vincent Lindon; Simon Michaël; Danièle Thompson; Patrick Timsit
- Produced by: Dominique Farrugia; Olivier Granier; Antoine Gannagé
- Starring: Patrick Timsit; Vincent Lindon
- Cinematography: Vincenzo Marano
- Edited by: Catherine Renault
- Music by: Frank Roussel
- Production companies: Canal+ TF1 Films Production; Rigolo Films 2000
- Distributed by: AMLF
- Release date: 29 April 1998
- Running time: 111 minutes
- Country: France
- Language: French
- Budget: $9.4 million
- Box office: $7 million

Paparazzi is a 1998 French comedy film, directed by Alain Berbérian.

== Plot ==
Franck Bordoni (Patrick Timsit) loses his job as a night watchman when he finds himself inadvertently on the front cover of a popular magazine. The photograph was taken while he was enjoying a football match instead of working. Deciding to punish the photographer, Franck visits the magazine's offices and finds Michel Verdier (Vincent Lindon), a member of the paparazzi pack. Franck clings to Michel; he becomes fascinated by the man's work and is eager to serve as an apprentice. Franck immerses himself in an exciting new life (and Isabelle Adjani’s dustbins), however he hardly notices as his former life (including wife and son) disappears.

== Cast ==
- Vincent Lindon : Michel Verdier
- Patrick Timsit : Franck Bordoni
- Catherine Frot : Evelyne Bordoni
- Nathalie Baye : Nicole
- Isabelle Gélinas : Sandra
- Élise Tielrooy : Bénédicte
- Didier Bénureau : Dacharie
- Géraldine Bonnet-Guérin : Julie
- Tim Doughty : M.C. Watson
- Christophe Hémon : Xavier
- Jean-Noël Cridlig-Veneziano : Nicolas
- Christophe Guybet : Médi
- Stefan Elbaum : Foreman
- Dominique Besnehard : Dédé
- Hichem Rostom : Kabouli
- Jean-Marie Winling : Franck's boss
- Françoise Lépine : The press officer
