= The Three Musketeers: Milady =

2023 film by Martin Bourboulon

- Theatrical release poster
- French: Les Trois Mousquetaires: Milady
- Directed by: Martin Bourboulon
- Written by: Matthieu Delaporte; Alexandre de La Patellière
- Based on: The Three Musketeers by Alexandre Dumas
- Produced by: Dimitri Rassam
- Starring: François Civil; Vincent Cassel; Pio Marmaï; Romain Duris; Eva Green
- Cinematography: Nicolas Bolduc
- Edited by: Stan Collet
- Music by: Guillaume Roussel
- Production companies: Pathé; Chapter 2; M6 Films; Constantin Film; DeAPlaneta; Umedia
- Distributed by: Pathé Distribution (France); Alternative Films (Belgium); Constantin Film (Germany); DeAPlaneta (Spain)
- Release dates: 18 November 2023 (Varilux French Cinema Festival, Rio de Janeiro); 13 December 2023 (France); 13 December 2023 (Belgium); 18 April 2024 (Germany); 26 January 2024 (Spain)
- Running time: 115 minutes
- Countries: France; Germany; Spain; Belgium
- Language: French
- Budget: €36.1 million; (US$39.1 million)
- Box office: $21.7 million

The Three Musketeers: Milady (French: Les Trois Mousquetaires: Milady, titled The Three Musketeers – Part II: Milady in the United States) is a 2023 action-adventure film directed by Martin Bourboulon, based on Alexandre Dumas's 1844 novel. It is the second film of a two-part saga, preceded by The Three Musketeers: D'Artagnan (2023). The film stars François Civil, Vincent Cassel, Pio Marmaï, Romain Duris, and Eva Green. The two films were co-produced by France, Germany, Spain and Belgium on a combined production budget of €72 million (US$78 million), with €36.1 million for Milady, and filmed back to back for 150 days from 16 August 2021 to 3 June 2022.

Milady made its world premiere at the Varilux French Cinema Festival in Rio de Janeiro on 18 November 2023. It was released theatrically in France by Pathé Distribution on 13 December 2023, in Belgium by Alternative Films on 13 December 2023 and in Spain by DeAPlaneta on 26 January 2024. It became available for digital purchase in Germany on 18 April 2024.

The film received generally positive reviews from critics and has sold over 2 million tickets in France. It received six nominations at the 2024 César Awards, winning Best Production Design.

== Plot ==
The film starts where the first part, The Three Musketeers: D'Artagnan, ends. D'Artagnan is knocked unconscious and captured by agents of Gaston, King Louis XIII's younger brother and heir presumptive. D'Artagnan escapes his captors and, in return, captures Comte de Chalais, Gaston's top henchman. He orders de Chalais to lead him to the prison cell where Constance is kept, but he unexpectedly finds there Milady de Winter, chained and apparently tortured. Milady and D'Artagnan escape together and spend a night in a forest hideout. Milady tries to seduce D'Artagnan, but to no avail. She leaves him sleeping. D'Artagnan is again caught by de Chalais' men, but he escapes again. Athos visits the family castle to see his five-year-old son. Together, they visit the grave of the boy's mother.

After surviving an assassination attempt at the end of the first part, Louis XIII decides to launch a war against La Rochelle, a Protestant stronghold on the west coast of France. D'Artagnan and his friends are sent to La Rochelle with the Musketeers, an elite unit of the French army, under the command of Captain Treville. In the war camp, D'Artagnan meets Milady who again attempts to seduce him. As they engage in kissing and undressing, D'Artagnan discovers a fleur-de-lis branded on her shoulder, and he realizes that she is the woman that Athos told him about in the first part. Milady de Winter flees. Athos learns from D'Artagnan that his former wife, the mother of his son, is apparently alive.

A small group of the musketeers is led by Captain de Treville into a daring night raid to La Rochelle. Inside the fortress, they are discovered by Protestant rebels who were apparently informed about the coming raid by Comte de Chalais on Gaston's orders. With the help of Hannibal, a commander of another French army unit, the musketeers escape after a valiant fight.

Athos follows Cardinal Richelieu to a forest, where he secretly meets Milady. He learns that Milady is ordered to assassinate the Duke of Buckingham, whose support is critical to the La Rochelle rebels' war efforts. After Richelieu departs, Athos confronts Milady who reminds him of their past romance. She prepares to kill him, but he is saved by arriving Aramis and D'Artagnan, and she flees.

Cardinal Richelieu meets Queen Anne and promises to return Constance who was kept under arrest on his orders. The queen tells D'Artagnan that Constance is safe under Duke of Buckingham's guard in England. Benjamin, Athos' brother and one of the Protestant leaders, is captured by guards of Gaston and is condemned to death by drowning. Athos decides to abandon the French army to save his brother. Aramis and D'Artagnan join him. Together, they escape to England.

Milady travels to England to assassinate Duke of Buckingham. In Buckingham's castle, Milady is recognized by Constance. Milady is captured and condemned to death. Before hanging, Milady is visited by Constance in her captivity. Pitying the fate of a young and beautiful woman, Constance exchanges clothes with Milady and lets her escape. When executioners come for Milady, Constance tries to explain that she is not the person sentenced to death, but in vain. She is hanged in the palace courtyard. D'Artagnan and his friends are moments late to Constance's hanging. Together with Buckingham, they pursue Milady who used the time to set fire to the duke's palace. D'Artagnan enters the burning building to fight Milady. During the fight, Milady vanishes, and D'Artagnan is saved, unconscious, by his friends.

Captain de Treville is tried for treason in the King's court. Aramis and D'Artagnan arrive to bring evidence that Gaston communicated with La Rochelle rebels to plot against the king. Treville is exonerated. Athos comes home to his castle to discover that his young son Joseph was abducted by an unknown person. On the boy's bed, he finds an earring that was once in possession of his wife.

== Cast ==
- François Civil as D'Artagnan
- Vincent Cassel as Athos
- Pio Marmaï as Porthos
- Romain Duris as Aramis
- Eva Green as Milady de Winter
- Lyna Khoudri as Constance Bonacieux
- Louis Garrel as King Louis XIII
- Vicky Krieps as Anne of Austria
- Éric Ruf as Cardinal Richelieu
- Jacob Fortune-Lloyd as Duke of Buckingham
- Alexis Michalik as Villeneuve de Radis
- Patrick Mille as Henri de Talleyrand-Périgord
- Ivan Franek as Ardanza
- Ralph Amoussou as Hannibal, inspired by Aniaba
- Thibault Vinçon as Horace Saint Blancard, leader of the Huguenot rebellions
- Camille Rutherford as Mathilde d'Herblay

== Production ==
=== Development ===
The idea for the project started in 2019, when producer Dimitri Rassam spent the year looking for a subject that could spark a real event on the big screen and made a list of works that he wanted to produce, and one of them stood out: the 1844 novel The Three Musketeers by Alexandre Dumas. In December 2019, Rassam had a meeting with director Martin Bourboulon at a restaurant in Paris to talk about his desire to adapt the novel. During the meeting, Bourboulon remembered the 1994 film Revenge of the Musketeers directed by Bertrand Tavernier, which was produced by his father, Frédéric Bourboulon. During the summer of 1993, Bourboulon, aged 14, visited the set of Revenge of the Musketeers with his father and was impressed by the sets of the swashbuckling comedy filmed in the medieval alleys of Sarlat-la-Canéda and in the moat of the castle of Biron. With Bourboulon's verbal agreement, Rassam then recruited a duo of seasoned screenwriters: Matthieu Delaporte and Alexandre de La Patellière, and both immediately agreed.

On 13 May 2020, a meeting was held in Paris in the office of Chapter 2, Rassam's production company. A videoconference with Ardavan Safaee, president of Pathé Films, Rassam, Bourboulon, Delaporte and La Patellière. The two screenwriters presented a 60-page storyboard, summarizing their upcoming storyline for the project. Five hours later, the cutting was approved and the preparation for the film was launched, although the screenplay had not been finished. Contrary to the previous adaptations of the novel, Matthieu Delaporte and Alexandre de La Patellière wanted to make Dumas' work "a thriller in a violent world". Rassam described the project as "a response to American franchises".

On 29 June 2020, Pathé CEO Jérôme Seydoux announced that a new version of The Three Musketeers would be adapted for the cinema by his company. The screenplay started being written in the summer of 2020. On 14 October 2020, Pathé announced that the film would be split into two parts titled D'Artagnan and Milady, respectively, with Martin Bourboulon set to direct both films on a screenplay written by Matthieu Delaporte and Alexandre de La Patellière, and that shooting was expected to begin in France in summer 2021 and last seven months. Pathé also announced that both films would be released in 2023.

Produced by Dimitri Rassam for France's Chapter 2, a Mediawan Company, and Pathé, the two films were co-produced by M6 Films, Germany's Constantin Film, Spain's DeAPlaneta, and Belgium's Umedia. The combined production budget for the two films was €72 million, (US$78,2 million in 2023). €36,08 million for D'Artagnan and €36,16 million for Milady, (US$39.1 million). Which makes it the most expensive French production of 2023. The score was composed by Guillaume Roussel.

This is the first French film adaptation of The Three Musketeers in 62 years, since Bernard Borderie's two-part saga was released in 1961.

Director Martin Bourboulon said that the inspirations for this new adaptation of The Three Musketeers were The Duellists (1977), Raiders of the Lost Ark (1981), Cyrano de Bergerac (1990), La Reine Margot (1994), Gladiator (2000), Elephant (2003), and The Revenant (2015).

=== Pre-production ===
On 11 February 2021, Variety announced the cast, which included François Civil as D'Artagnan, Eva Green as Milady de Winter, Vincent Cassel as Athos, Pio Marmaï as Porthos, Romain Duris as Aramis, Lyna Khoudri as Constance Bonacieux, Louis Garrel as King Louis XIII, Vicky Krieps as Anne of Austria, and Oliver Jackson-Cohen as the Duke of Buckingham. The saga was pre-bought by M6, OCS and Canal Plus in February 2021. Pathé released the films theatrically in France and handled the international sales.

On 23 November 2021, Pathé revealed the release dates for both films; 5 April 2023 for D'Artagnan, and 13 December 2023 for Milady, and also revealed the full cast; Ralph Amoussou as Hannibal, Éric Ruf as Cardinal Richelieu, Marc Barbé as Captain de Tréville, Patrick Mille as The Count of Chalais, and Jacob Fortune-Lloyd as the Duke of Buckingham, replacing Oliver Jackson-Cohen.

For the musketeers, director Martin Bourboulon and producer Dimitri Rassam had an ideal list and the four actors they had thought of said "yes". They approached the actors even before having the final versions of the scripts and started by casting D'Artagnan, and François Civil was their first choice and the first actor who was cast for the project. It was Civil's childhood dream to play D'Artagnan. When he learned that Rassam wanted to meet with him to talk about the project at the beginning of 2020, he decided to give his all, so he trimmed his mustache, put his hair in a little ponytail, impersonated D'Artagnan during the meeting and lied to Rassam by telling him that The Three Musketeers was his bedside book and that he knew it by heart, even though he had bought it only two days before in audiobook format and listened to it at 3x speed to try to speed up the story a little so that he could be ready for his meeting with Rassam. Civil said the meeting was a bit like D'Artagnan against Tréville, the captain of the musketeers, when he arrived saying he was ready to be a musketeer, as he did the same thing with Rassam and it worked. Rassam said that meeting served mainly to confirm that Civil was the right choice for the role. "He arrived with a D'Artagnan haircut, he knew the novel to perfection... Everything contributed to making him an obvious choice. He had the panache and boldness that was necessary to play the character," Rassam said. Later on, around six to eight months from the time he was cast to the time he received the script, Civil finally read the book during the first lockdown due to the COVID-19 pandemic. Prior to that, he had been familiar with The Three Musketeers since he was a child because he used to watch a cartoon in which the musketeers were portrayed as dogs. He also used to play musketeers at the schoolyard as a child.

Éric Ruf, who plays Cardinal Richelieu in this film, had previously played Aramis in the 2004 French film Milady and the Three Musketeers, directed by Josée Dayan.

Vincent Cassel also had a previous connection with The Three Musketeers. His father, Jean-Pierre Cassel, played King Louis XIII in The Three Musketeers (1973) by Richard Lester, and Cassel accompanied his father on set and was very moved by it. Jean-Pierre Cassel had also played D'Artagnan in Cyrano and d'Artagnan (1964) by Abel Gance.

Bourboulon and Rassam were looking for modernity and wanted strong female characters. For the role of Milady, they wanted to have a "mysterious actress" and Eva Green was cast; "everyone knows her but we don't see her every month at the cinema," Bourboulon said. Cassel recommended Green to Rassam before they started filming the Apple TV+ series Liaison and even before they had met each other in person, and shortly after that, she received the scripts and accepted the role. Green's fear of horses almost prevented her from taking on the role, but Italian horse trainer and stuntman Mario Luraschi gave her confidence and she managed to ride a horse.

This new adaptation of The Three Musketeers will introduce a new character, Hannibal (portrayed by Ralph Amoussou), based on the true story of Louis Anniaba, the prince of Assinie and France's first Black musketeer.

Porthos (portrayed by Pio Marmaï) is bisexual in this version. Marmaï also had to gain 10 kilos for the role.

The four actors who played the musketeers met for the first time almost like in the novel: crossing swords at a fencing lesson. Olympic Épée champion Yannick Borel trained the actors. Civil performed 90% of his own stunts, after six months of intense physical preparation on fencing, sword-fighting and horse-riding. Yannick Borel taught him postures and movements for five months, three hours a week. He then learned horse-riding with Marco Luraschi (who was also his understudy) at the ranch of the Luraschi family in Fontaine-Chaalis, and combat choreography with stuntmen Dominique and Sébastien Fouassier in a dojo in Paris. Civil was left temporarily blind in one eye for 36 hours due to an incorrectly applied make-up product on set. He also broke his foot following a fall at home coming down from a stepladder and had to shoot the final scenes with a broken foot and protected by a huge foam shoe, which do not appear on screen.

François Civil found that D'Artagnan was a little too insistent in his flirting with Constance Bonacieux, and even if it is written that way in Dumas' novel, he thought it would be interesting to modernize this seduction by injecting a little more respect into it, so he managed to have the scenes between the two of them rewritten. "The man does not occupy the same place today as in the 17th century, and that is why I was attentive to the writing of my scenes with Lyna Khoudri", Civil told Madame Figaro. He also added that D'Artagnan keeps his panache and his somewhat clumsy side, but he is never "heavy" and "always remains charming" in the version of the screenplay written by Alexandre de La Patellière and Matthieu Delaporte. In turn, Constance is not portrayed as a passive woman and her relationship with D'Artagnan is "filled with respect and consent," Civil said.

Director Martin Bourboulon had initially forbidden the famous feathered hat of the musketeers, fearing that this accessory would make his costumes "old-fashioned", as he was looking for "dirt, authenticity, far from the Epinal image of the hat and its twirling feather," he said. He was convinced by the film's costume designer, Thierry Delettre, to change his mind and ended up adopting the hat. No digital effects were used in the film, except to erase a few contemporary elements such as bus shelters or parking meters appearing in the background.

=== Filming ===
The two films were shot back to back for 150 days on location in France, in landmarks such as the Louvre Palace, the Hôtel des Invalides, the Castles of Fontainebleau and Saint-Germain-en-Laye, Fort-la-Latte and Chantilly, as well as the citadel of Saint-Malo and the historic city center of Troyes. Filming began on 16 August 2021, and wrapped on 3 June 2022 at the Farcheville castle. 2000 costumes, 930 technicians, 650 horses and 9,000 extras were used in the production.

=== Post-production ===
Following feedback from the audience on the first film, director Martin Bourboulon corrected the colorimetry in The Three Musketeers: Milady that was deemed "too dark" in The Three Musketeers: D'Artagnan. "We realized that some scenes in the first film were a little dense. The charm of making two films at the same time is that we were able to rework it. We were vigilant about that. As we know that not all cinemas are calibrated in the same way in France, we were a little vigilant to ensure that the image was as clear and readable as possible," Bourboulon told BFM TV. The director also said that this had been planned well before the release of the first film because Milady takes place mostly outdoors and by the sea, which pushed the filmmakers to lighten the images. Bourboulon also said that the images from the first film will not be reworked to look clearer.

== Soundtrack ==
The album with the film's official soundtrack composed by Guillaume Roussel, was released via streaming and digital download by Milan Records on 13 December 2023. A CD version was released on 15 December 2023.

Les Trois Mousquetaires : Milady (Bande originale du film)

Soundtrack album by Guillaume Roussel
- Released: 13 December 2023
- Genre: Film soundtrack
- Length: 43:28
- Label: Milan Records

=== Track listing ===
All tracks are written by Guillaume Roussel.

Les Trois Mousquetaires : Milady (Bande originale du film)
No.	Title	Length
1.	"Vers la Rochelle"	03:14
2.	"Milady et d'Artagnan"	04:10
3.	"Sortie en ville"	02:36
4.	"Un amour maudit"	02:28
5.	"Citadelle"	06:45
6.	"La prière de d'Artagnan"	03:20
7.	"Richelieu"	02:48
8.	"Benjamin au pilori"	03:17
9.	"Athos et Benjamin"	02:10
10.	"Une dernière volonté"	04:14
11.	"Le feu qui te consumera"	02:59
12.	"Procès Tréville"	02:36
13.	"Athos et Joseph"	02:57
Total length:		43:28

== Release ==
The film made its world premiere at the Varilux French Cinema Festival in Rio de Janeiro, Brazil on 18 November 2023. It was released theatrically in France by Pathé on 13 December 2023, in Belgium by Alternative Films on 13 December 2023, and in Spain by DeAPlaneta on 26 January 2024. In Germany, the film was originally scheduled to be released in theaters on 14 December 2023, but Constantin Film canceled the theatrical release and decided to make the film available for digital purchase on 18 April 2024, and on DVD and Blu-Ray on 2 May 2024.

== Reception ==
=== Critical response ===
==== France ====
AlloCiné, a French cinema site, gave the film an average rating of 3.3/5, based on a survey of 36 French reviews.

==== International ====
Rotten Tomatoes gives the film a score of 87% based on 45 reviews, with a weighted average of 7.2/10. The website's critical consensus states: "Picking up where its predecessor left off, The Three Musketeers: Part II - Milady proves there's still swashbuckling fun to be had in modern adaptations of the Dumas classic." Metacritic assigned the film a weighted average score of 74 out of 100, based on 19 critics, indicating "generally favorable reviews".

=== Box office ===
==== France ====
For its first day of release in France, The Three Musketeers: Milady sold 149,164 tickets from a total of 2,670 screenings in 724 theaters, debuting at number two at the box office among the new releases in its opening day, behind Wonka (184.927 admissions). For its first weekend of release, the film sold 611,371 tickets from 12,807 screenings in 724 theaters, debuting at number two at the box office, behind Wonka (689,706 admissions). Milady reached 1,173,072 admissions in its second week of release, and was ranked at number three at the French box office. In its fourth weekend, the film surpassed two million tickets sold in France, remaining at number three at the box office. In its fifth weekend, the film reached 2.3 million tickets sold in France and was placed at number four at the box office.

==== International ====
The film was released to 164 theaters in the United Kingdom where it debuted at number 16 at the box office, grossing $80,106 in its first weekend. In the Czech Republic, the film was released to 135 theaters and debuted at number nine, grossing $25,320 in its first weekend.

As of June 2024, the film has grossed $21,738,087 worldwide.

=== Awards and nominations ===
Award	Date of ceremony	Category	Recipient(s)	Result	Ref.
César Awards	23 February 2024	Best Cinematography	Nicolas Bolduc	Nominated	
César Awards	23 February 2024	Best Sound	David Rit, Gwennolé Le Borgne, Olivier Touche, Cyril Holtz, and Niels Barletta	Nominated	
César Awards	23 February 2024	Best Original Music	Guillaume Roussel	Nominated	
César Awards	23 February 2024	Best Costume Design	Thierry Delettre	Nominated	
César Awards	23 February 2024	Best Production Design	Stéphane Taillasson	Won	
César Awards	23 February 2024	Best Visual Effects	Olivier Cauwet	Nominated	
