= Claire Nadeau =

French actress (born 1945)

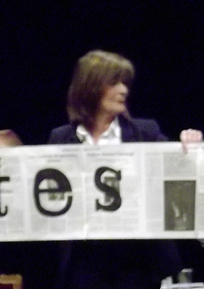
- Claire Nadeau, 2011
- Born: 1 June 1945 (age 79); Paris, France
- Occupation: Actress
- Years active: 1964–present

Claire Nadeau (French: [nado]; born 1 June 1945) is a French actress.

== Theater ==
Year	Title	Author	Director	Notes
1964	Lorenzaccio	Alfred de Musset	Raymond Rouleau	
1965	The Trojan Women	Euripides	Michael Cacoyannis	
1969-70	Orden	Girolamo Arrigo	Jorge Lavelli	
1971	Thérèse est triste	Coluche	Coluche	
1971	La Petite Voiture de flammes	Liliane Atlan	Michel Hermon	
1973	Ginette Lacaze	Coluche	Coluche (2)	
1973	Introduction à l'esthétique	Coluche	Coluche (3)	
1973	L'amour c'est un bouquet	Philippe Bruneau	Philippe Bruneau	
1975	Le triangle frappe encore	Marc'O	Marc'O	
1975	Viens chez moi, j'habite chez une copine	Luis Rego & Didier Kaminka	Jean-Luc Moreau	
1978	La dame au slip rouge	Romain Bouteille	Romain Bouteille	
1979-80	Elle voit des nains partout !	Philippe Bruneau	Philippe Bruneau (2)	
1982	Gramps Is in the Resistance	Christian Clavier & Martin Lamotte	Martin Lamotte	
1983	Le monde est petit, les pygmées aussi	Philippe Bruneau	Philippe Bruneau (3)	
1988	The Great Nebula in Orion	Lanford Wilson	Blandine Harmelin	
1990	Deux femmes pour un fantôme	René de Obaldia	Jean-Luc Moreau (2)	
1990	La Baby-sitter	René de Obaldia	Jean-Luc Moreau (3)	
1990	Coiffure pour dames	Robert Harling	Stéphane Hillel	Nominated - Molière Award for Best Adapted Screenplay
1991	Rumors	Neil Simon	Pierre Mondy	
1993	Ce qui arrive et ce qu'on attend	Jean-Marie Besset	Patrice Kerbrat	
1995	Benefactors	Michael Frayn	Jean-Luc Moreau (4)	Nominated - Molière Award for Best Supporting Actress
1999	Mariages et conséquences	Alan Ayckbourn	Catherine Allary	Nominated - Molière Award for Best Supporting Actress; Nominated - Molière Award for Best Adapted Screenplay
2001	Le Jardin des apparences	Véronique Olmi	Gildas Bourdet	Nominated - Molière Award for Best Supporting Actress
2003	Remue-Ménage	Alan Ayckbourn	Pierre Mondy (2)	
2005	Si c'était à refaire	Laurent Ruquier	Jean-Luc Moreau (5)	
2007	La Divine Miss V	Mark Hampton & Mary Louise Wilson	Jean-Paul Muel	
2008	The Vagina Monologues	Eve Ensler	Isabelle Rattier	
2009	La serva amorosa	Carlo Goldoni	Christophe Lidon	Molière Award for Best Supporting Actress
2012	Harold and Maude	Colin Higgins	Ladislas Chollat	
2012	L'invité	David Pharao	Stéphane Hillel (2)	
2013	La Station Champbaudet	Eugène Labiche	Ladislas Chollat (2)	
2013	Mon beau-père une princesse	Didier Bénureau	Didier Bénureau	
2015	Les Grandes filles	Stéphan Guérin-Tillié	Jean-Paul Muel (2)	
2016	Mange !	Bénédicte Fossey & Eric Romand	Pierre Cassignard	

== Filmography ==
Year	Title	Role	Director	Notes
1967	Hôtel Racine	Macha	Pierre Badel	TV movie
1968	Les compagnons de Baal	Françoise Cordier	Pierre Prévert	TV mini-series
1969	Le boeuf clandestin	Roberte Berthau	Jacques Pierre	TV movie
1969	Les Cinq Dernières Minutes	Christiane Fontoy	Claude Loursais	TV series (1 episode)
1973	Hail the Artist		Yves Robert	
1974	Juliette et Juliette		Remo Forlani	
1976	Duelle	Sylvia Stern	Jacques Rivette	
1978	Dossier 51	The 9000 Friend	Michel Deville	
1978	L'exercice du pouvoir	Francine Sophie	Philippe Galland	
1981	For a Cop's Hide	The TV presenter	Alain Delon	
1982	Le mystère du gala maudit		Bernard Lion	TV movie
1983	Joy	The Director	Sergio Bergonzelli	
1984	Cocoricocoboy	Various	Dominique Masson	TV series (1 episode)
1985	Collaricocoshow	Various	Stéphane Collaro	TV series (1 episode)
1986	Je hais les acteurs	Miss Wondershake	Gérard Krawczyk	
1986	Bing	Gaby	Nino Monti	TV movie
1987	Poule et frites	Mathilde	Luis Rego	
1987	Grand Guignol	Adelaïde	Jean Marboeuf	
1989	Le suspect		Yves Boisset	TV movie
1989	Les jupons de la révolution	Madame de Brionne	Vincent De Brus	TV series (1 episode)
1989	Si Guitry m'était conté	Madame Putifat	Yves-André Hubert	TV series (2 episodes)
1990	There Were Days... and Moons	Cheated woman	Claude Lelouch	
1990	La belle Anglaise		Jacques Besnard	TV series (1 episode)
1991	The Professional Secrets of Dr. Apfelgluck	The hotelier	Alessandro Capone, Thierry Lhermitte, ...	
1991	Léon Duras, chroniqueur mondain			TV series (1 episode)
1992	Rumeurs	Claire	André Flédérick	TV movie
1993	Une journée chez ma mère	Anne-Marie	Dominique Cheminal	
1993	Chambre froide	Herminie	Sylvain Madigan	TV movie
1995	Nelly and Mr. Arnaud	Jacqueline	Claude Sautet	Nominated - César Award for Best Supporting Actress
1995	Joséphine et les gitans	Carla	Vincent Ravalec	Short
1995	Lulu roi de France	The Countess	Bernard Uzan	TV movie
1996	Ma femme me quitte	Nadia Martin	Didier Kaminka	
1996	Le masseur	Voice	Vincent Ravalec (2)	Short
1997	Same Old Song	Female Guest	Alain Resnais	
1997	L'enfant du bout du monde	Hélène	Christian Faure	TV movie
1997	Paloma	Rejane	Marianne Lamour	TV movie
1998	The Visitors II: The Corridors of Time	Cora de Montmirail	Jean-Marie Poiré	
1998	Restons groupés	Nicole	Jean-Paul Salomé	
1998	Chez ma tante	Jeanne Lafarge	Daniel Ravoux	TV movie
1998	H	Eliane Strauss	Édouard Molinaro	TV series (1 episode)
1999	L'ami du jardin	Marie-Françoise	Jean-Louis Bouchaud	
1999	À vot' service	The Customer	Philippe Vauvillé	
1999	Le premier pas	The Woman	Florence Vignon	Short
1999	Animal Farm	Muriel	John Stephenson	TV movie
2000	Fate un bel sorriso	Jezebele	Anna Di Francisca	
2001	L'affaire Kergalen	Aliénor Leguennec	Laurent Jaoui	TV movie
2001	Villa mon rêve	Madame Leclerc	Didier Grousset	TV movie
2001	Sauveur Giordano	Louise	Pierre Joassin	TV series (1 episode)
2002	La merveilleuse odyssée de l'idiot Toboggan	Voice	Vincent Ravalec (3)	
2002	Sachez chasser	Karen Plisson	Elsa Barrère & Marc Fitoussi	Short
2003	7 ans de mariage	Viviane	Didier Bourdon	
2003	Ticket choc	The beautician	Marie-Pierre Huster	Short
2004	Trop jeune pour moi ?	Jacqueline	Patrick Volson	TV movie
2005	La vie à mains nues	Françoise	Sébastien Grall	TV movie
2005	La crim'	Madame Jacobert	Jean-Pierre Prévost	TV series (1 episode)
2006	Les Petites vacances	Nicole	Olivier Peyon	
2006	Madame Irma	Nicole	Didier Bourdon (2) & Yves Fajnberge	
2006	La vie privée	Madame Mellifond	Zina Modiano	
2006	Tombé du ciel	Agnès	Stéphane Kappes	TV mini-series
2006	Trois pères à la maison	Cathy	Stéphane Kappes (2)	TV series (1 episode)
2006-09	Kaamelott	Cryda de Tintagel	Alexandre Astier	TV series (6 episodes)
2007	The Merry Widow	Viviane	Isabelle Mergault	
2010	Un divorce de chien	Madame Schoum	Lorraine Lévy	TV movie
2011	Les Tuche	Grandma Suze	Olivier Baroux	
2011	À la maison pour Noël	Madame Chanfort	Christian Merret-Palmair	TV movie
2011-15	Hard	Anne-Marie Teissere	Cathy Verney, Melissa Drigeard, ...	TV series (7 episodes)
2012	Capital	Marc's mother	Costa-Gavras	
2012	La smala s'en mêle	Mado	Didier Grousset (2)	TV series (1 episode)
2013	Fais pas ci, fais pas ça	Marie-Françoise Lepic	Cathy Verney (2)	TV series (1 episode)
2014	On a marché sur Bangkok	Jacqueline	Olivier Baroux (2)	
2015	L'homme de la situation	Irène Saint Sabin	Stéphane Kappes (3)	TV series (1 episode)
2016	Les Tuche 2	Grandma Suze	Olivier Baroux (3)	
