= Serial Lover =

- Film poster
- Directed by: James Huth
- Written by: Romain Berthomieu; James Huth
- Produced by: Philippe Rousselet
- Starring: Michèle Laroque; Albert Dupontel
- Cinematography: Jean-Claude Thibaut
- Edited by: Scott Stevenson
- Music by: Bruno Coulais
- Distributed by: Rezo Films
- Release date: 22 April 1998
- Running time: 83 minutes
- Country: France
- Language: French
- Budget: $6.2 million
- Box office: $1.4 million

Serial Lover is a 1998 film directed by James Huth.

== Plot ==
Claire Doste is about to reach the age of 35 and has everything one dreams of, such as having four boyfriends and a creative job in a publishing house specialising in crime novels. One day, she invites all of her boyfriends to her birthday dinner so that she can pick out her would-be fiancé. But an accident happens when Claire is getting the dinner ready.

== Cast ==
- Michèle Laroque as Claire Doste
- Albert Dupontel as Eric Cellier
- Elise Tielrooy as Alice Doste
- Michel Vuillermoz as Charles Thiriot
- Marina Foïs as Mina Schuster
- Isabelle Nanty as Isabelle
- Zinedine Soualem as Prince Hakim
- Jean-Paul Rouve as Edouard 'Douad' Pied
- Elise Larnicol as Hakim's girlfriend
