= Les Tuche 2 =

- Theatrical release poster
- Directed by: Olivier Baroux
- Screenplay by: Philippe Mechelen; Lionel Dutemple; Julien Hervé; Benjamin Morgaine; Nessim Chikhaoui
- Produced by: Richard Grandpierre
- Starring: Jean-Paul Rouve; Isabelle Nanty
- Cinematography: Christian Abomnes
- Edited by: Richard Marizy
- Production companies: Eskwad; Pathé; TF1 Films Production; Prod par 4 Ciné; Jouror Films
- Distributed by: Pathé
- Release dates: 13 January 2016 (Alpe d'Huez Film Festival); 3 February 2016 (France)
- Running time: 94 minutes
- Country: France
- Language: French
- Budget: $15.2 million
- Box office: $35.2 million

Les Tuche 2 is a 2016 French comedy film directed by Olivier Baroux. It is the sequel to Les Tuche. It earned over US$32.5 million and was the highest-grossing domestic film in France in 2016, with 4,619,884 tickets sold.

== Cast ==
- Jean-Paul Rouve as Jeff Tuche
- Isabelle Nanty as Cathy Tuche
- Claire Nadeau as Grandma Suze
- Théo Fernandez as Donald Tuche
- Sarah Stern as Stéphanie Tuche
- Pierre Lottin as Wilfried Tuche
- Ralph Amoussou as Georges Diouf
- Darrell Dennis as Indian

== Release ==
Les Tuche 2 was distributed by Pathé in France.

== Reception ==
The Hollywood Reporter gave the film a negative review, finding the film's comedy to be "puerile and naive whenever it’s not straightforwardly moronic", noting a list of American clichés and that "like in local box-office monsters Intouchables and Serial (Bad) Weddings, what passes for crude humor in France can be perceived as racially insensitive in the U.S. and elsewhere". The review commented on the writing as "staggeringly lazy and unfocused".
