= Kad Merad =

French-Algerian filmmaker and actor (born 1964)

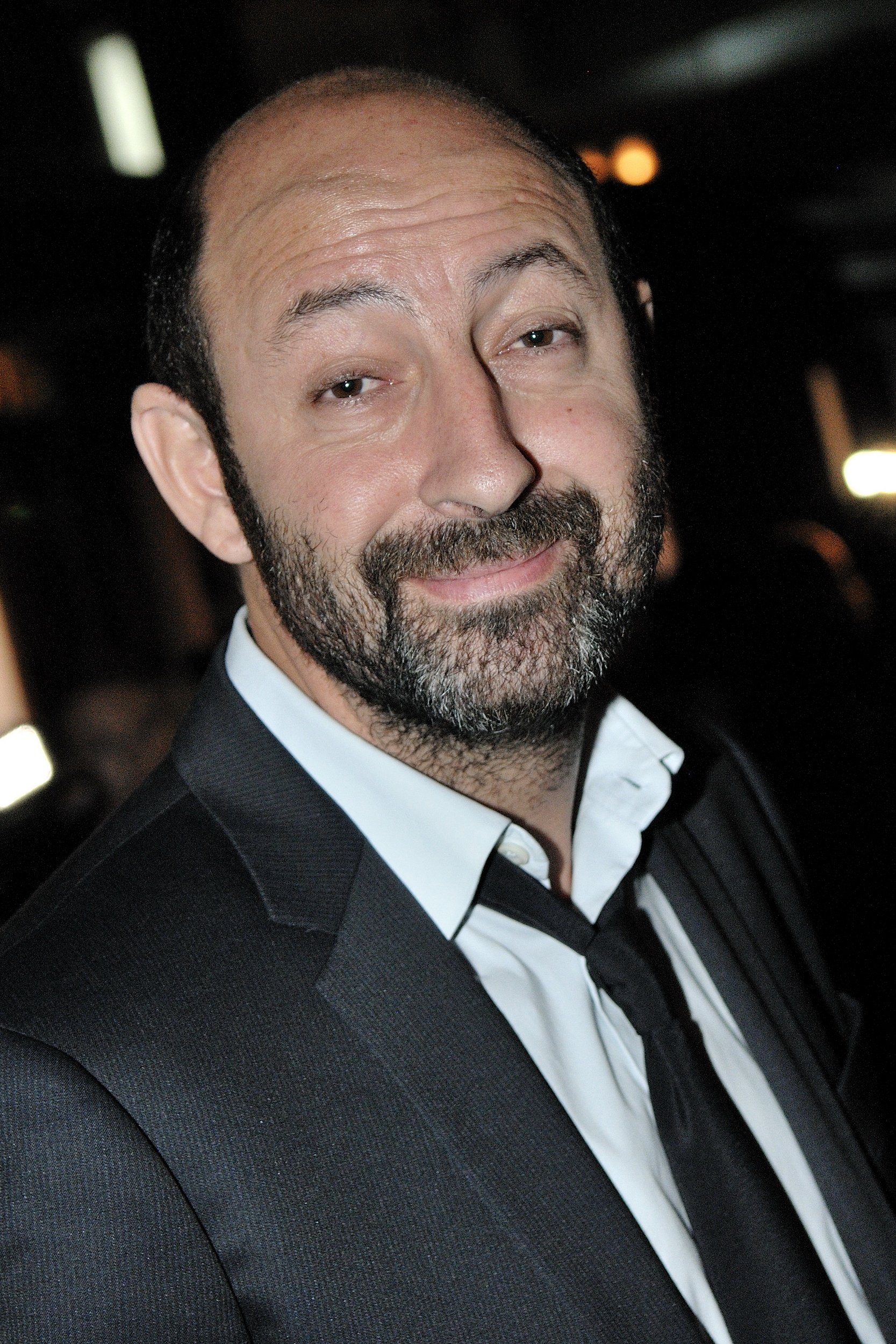
- Kad Merad at the premiere of Le Petit Nicolas in 2009
- Born: Kaddour Merad; 27 March 1964 (age 62); Sidi Bel Abbès, Algeria
- Years active: 1991-present
- Spouse: Emmanuelle Cosso-Mérad (m. 1992–2012)
- Partner: Julia Vignali (2014-present)
- Children: 2

Kad Merad (born Kaddour Merad, Arabic: قدور ميراد; 27 March 1964) is a French-Algerian writer and actor.

== Life and career ==
Kad Merad was born in Sidi Bel Abbès, Algeria, on 27 March 1964 to an Algerian father and a French mother.

During his teens, he played drums and sang with various rock bands. Soon afterwards, he started playing roles at Club Med alongside the Gigolo Brothers troupe.

In 1990, he was hired by Ouï FM, the Paris rock radio station where he met Olivier Baroux. The duet most known as Kad & Olivier began working together and started their own show, the Rock'n Roll Circus, introducing some of their most famous sketches (Pamela Rose, Teddy Porc Fidèle...). The early success of the show allowed them to meet Jean-Luc Delarue who brought their act to TV.

In 1999, they began appearing on the French Satellite TV channel Comédie+ on their own show, La Grosse Emission. At the same time, Merad started his Cinema career with a lot of secondary roles.

In 2003, he scored his first box-office success with Mais Qui a tué Pamela Rose?, co-written with Baroux.

In 2007, Kad received the César Award for Best Supporting Actor for his role in Je vais Bien, ne t'en fais pas! and appears in AaRON's film soundtrack video clip. His best challenger was Dany Boon. During the shooting of Bienvenue chez les Ch'tis, this friendly struggle was a running joke between the two of them.

That same year, he made his first appearance with Les Enfoirés music troop and is still one of its members. He was also inducted as the Godfather of the Telethon.

The next year, he starred as Phillipe Abrams in the French movie Bienvenue chez les Ch'tis. The film was a surprise - and phenomenal - success in France and Europe, becoming the best-attended movie ever made in France, with 21 million moviegoers.

== Filmography ==
=== As actor ===
Year	Title	Role	Director	Notes
1991	Tribunal	Ahmed Ben Mabrouk	Georges Bensoussan	TV series (1 episode)
1992	La Cavale des fous	A cop	Marco Pico	
1992-96	Rock'n Roll Circus	Host		TV show
1995	Dialogue au sommet	Igor	Xavier Giannoli	Short
1996	Jour de chance au bâtiment C		Lionel Gédébé	Short; Also writer
1998	Les trente dernières minutes	Darius Perrini	Christophe Janin	TV series (26 episodes)
1999	Jeu de vilains	Monsieur Tosca	Hervé Eparvier	Short
1999	Blague à part	Maxwell	François Greze	TV series (1 episode)
1999-2001	La Grosse émission	Host	Virginie Lovisone	TV show
2001	La stratégie de l'échec	Mr. Golden	Dominique Farrugia	
2001	La grande vie !	The biker	Philippe Dajoux	
2001	Faute de grive	The man	Patrick Bosso	Short
2001	Un gars, une fille	The guy	Francis Duquet	TV series (1 episode)
2001	La cape et l'épée	Yaziz	Bernard Faroux	TV series (1 episode)
2001	Caméra Café	Various	Francis Duquet (2)	TV series (2 episodes)
2002	Les tombales	Gustave	Christophe Barratier	Short
2002	Visite guidée	Gérard Lanza	Caroline Roucoux & Hervé Thébault	Short
2003	The Car Keys	Himself	Laurent Baffie	
2003	Mais Qui a tué Pamela Rose?	Richard Bullit	Éric Lartigau	Also writer
2003	Rien que du bonheur	Pierre	Denis Parent	
2003	Le pharmacien de garde	The jurist	Jean Veber	
2003	La beuze	The artistic director	François Desagnat & Thomas Sorriaux	
2003	Bloody Christmas	The man	Michel Leray	Short
2003	Samedi soir en direct	Various	Several	TV show Also writer
2003	Brother Bear	Tuke	Aaron Blaise & Robert Walker	French voice
2003	Soyez prudents...		Lionel Gédébé (2)	TV series (1 episode)
2004	The Chorus	Chabert	Christophe Barratier (2)	
2004	Les Dalton	The Mexican	Philippe Haïm	
2004	Monde extérieur	Bertrand	David Rault	Short
2005	Iznogoud	Ouzmoutousouloubouloubombê	Patrick Braoudé	
2005	Propriété commune	Martin	Michel Leray (2)	Short
2005	Toilet Zone	Various	Olivier Baroux	TV show Also writer
2006	Don't Worry, I'm Fine	Paul Tellier	Philippe Lioret	César Award for Best Supporting Actor; Nominated - Étoiles d'Or for Best Male Newcomer
2006	Beyond the Ocean	Tango's uncle	Éliane de Latour	
2006	Un ticket pour l'espace	Cardoux	Éric Lartigau (2)	Also writer
2006	Essaye-moi	Vincent	Pierre-François Martin-Laval	
2006	J'invente rien	Paul Thalman	Michel Leclerc	
2006	Les irréductibles	Gérard Mathieu	Renaud Bertrand	
2006	Star Trek... ou presque		Romain Protat	TV movie Also writer
2006	Brother Bear 2	Tuke	Ben Gluck	French voice
2006	Happy Feet	Ramón	George Miller	French voice
2007	Could This Be Love?	Rachid	Pierre Jolivet	
2007	3 amis	Baptiste 'Titi' Capla	Michel Boujenah	
2007	Pur week-end	Frédéric 'Fred' Alvaro	Olivier Doran	
2007	La tête de maman	Jacques Charlot	Carine Tardieu	
2007	Ce soir, je dors chez toi	Jacques	Olivier Baroux (2)	
2008	Bienvenue chez les Ch'tis	Philippe Abrams	Dany Boon	Nominated - Globes de Cristal Award for Best Actor
2008	Paris 36	Jacky	Christophe Barratier (3)	
2008	Modern Love	Olivier	Stéphane Kazandjian	
2008	Mes stars et moi	Robert Pelage	Laetitia Colombani	
2009	Little Nicholas	Nicolas's father	Laurent Tirard	
2009	Safari	Richard Dacier	Olivier Baroux (3)	
2009	R.T.T.	Arthur Lepage	Frédéric Berthe	
2010	22 Bullets	Tony Zacchia	Richard Berry	
2010	Protéger & servir	Michel Boudriau	Éric Lavaine	
2010	L'Italien	Mourad Ben Saoud / Dino Fabrizzi	Olivier Baroux (4)	
2010	Megamind	Megamind	Tom McGrath	French voice
2011	The Well-Digger's Daughter	Félipe Rambert	Daniel Auteuil	
2011	Monsieur Papa	Robert Pique	Kad Merad	
2011	La nouvelle guerre des boutons	Father Lebrac	Christophe Barratier (4)	
2011	Les Tuche	The fishmonger	Olivier Baroux (5)	
2011	JC comme Jésus Christ	Himself	Jonathan Zaccaï	
2011	Happy Feet Two	Ramon	George Miller (2)	French voice
2012	Superstar	Martin Kazinski	Xavier Giannoli (2)	
2012	Mais Qui a re-tué Pamela Rose?	Richard Bullit	Kad Merad (2) & Olivier Baroux (6)	
2013	The Big Bad Wolf	Louis Delcroix	Nicolas & Bruno	
2013	Des gens qui s'embrassent	Roni Melkowich	Danièle Thompson	
2014	Supercondriaque	Dr. Dimitri Zvenka	Dany Boon (2)	
2014	Nicholas on Holiday	Nicolas's father	Laurent Tirard (2)	
2014	On a marché sur Bangkok	Serge Renart	Olivier Baroux (7)	
2014	Disparue en hiver	Daniel Vernant	Christophe Lamotte	
2015	Bis	Patrice Olesky	Dominique Farrugia (2)	
2015	On voulait tout casser	Kiki	Philippe Guillard	
2015	Hotel Transylvania 2	Count Dracula	Genndy Tartakovsky	French voice
2015	Peplum	Timo	Philippe Lefebvre	TV series (1 episode)
2016	Marseille	Paolo	Kad Merad (3)	
2016	La folle histoire de Max et Léon	The actor	Jonathan Barré	
2016–20	Republican Gangsters (Baron Noir)	Philippe Rickwaert	Ziad Doueiri	TV series (24 episodes); ACS Award for Best Actor (2016); Nominated - ACS Award for Best Actor (2018)
2017	Alibi.com	Monsieur Godet	Philippe Lacheau	
2017	La Mélodie	Simon	Rachid Hami	
2017	Comme des rois		Xabi Molia	
2018	Brillantissime	Doctor Steinman	Michèle Laroque	
2018	Le Doudou		Philippe Mechelen & Julien Hervé	
2019	Just a Gigolo	Alex	Olivier Baroux (8)	
2019	La part au soupçon	Thomas Kertez	Christophe Lamotte	TV series (2 episodes)
2020	The Big Hit	Etienne Carboni		
2022	Oussekine	Georges Kiejman	Antoine Chevrollier	
2023	Life for Real	Louis	Dany Boon (3)	
2024	Finalement	Lino		

=== Director / Writer ===
Year	Title	Notes
2011	Monsieur Papa	
2012	Mais Qui a tué Pamela Rose?	
2016	Marseille	

== Theater ==
Year	Title	Author	Director	Notes
1992	Histoires Camiques	Sylvian Bruchon	Michel Feder	Théâtre le Funambule
2010	The Shop at the Corner of the Street	Miklós László	Jean-Luc Revol	Théâtre de Paris
2016–17	Acting	Xavier Durringer	Xavier Durringer	
