= Monsieur Papa (2011 film) =

- Theatrical release poster
- Directed by: Kad Merad
- Written by: Anne Valton; Luc Chaumar; Emmanuelle Cosso
- Produced by: Judith Aubry; Romain Le Grand
- Starring: Michèle Laroque; Kad Merad
- Cinematography: Régis Blondeau
- Edited by: Christophe Pinel
- Distributed by: Pathé
- Release dates: 17 April 2011 (COLCOA); 1 June 2011 (France)
- Running time: 96 minutes
- Country: France
- Language: French
- Budget: $9.7 million
- Box office: $3.8 million

Monsieur Papa is a 2011 French film directed by Kad Merad and starring Michèle Laroque and Kad Merad.

== Plot ==
Marius Vallois is 12 years old and needs a father. Marie Vallois has a 12-year-old son, heavy work responsibilities, a lover to calm, a position to fill, an adored sister and a complicated cousin, but no father for Marius. Robert Pique has a steam iron, is always late with the laundry, a Chinese fantasy, a neighbor who he protects and is looking for a job. Monsieur Papa is a story of a curious link which weaves between these 3 characters. A link which will give them difficulty and attachment for life.

== Cast ==
- Michèle Laroque as Marie Vallois
- Kad Merad as Robert Pique
- Gaspard Meier-Chaurand as Marius
- Judith El Zein as Sonia
- Vincent Perez as Jean-Laurent
- Myriam Boyer as Suzy Benchetrit
- Florence Maury as Chloé
- Emmanuel Patron as Marie's friend
- Clovis Cornillac as Vidal
- Bernard Le Coq as Mr Forlani
- Olivier Baroux as Richard
- Jacques Balutin as caretaker
- Jacques Herlin as the oldtimer in an armchair
