= Maurice Barthélemy =

French actor, director and screenwriter

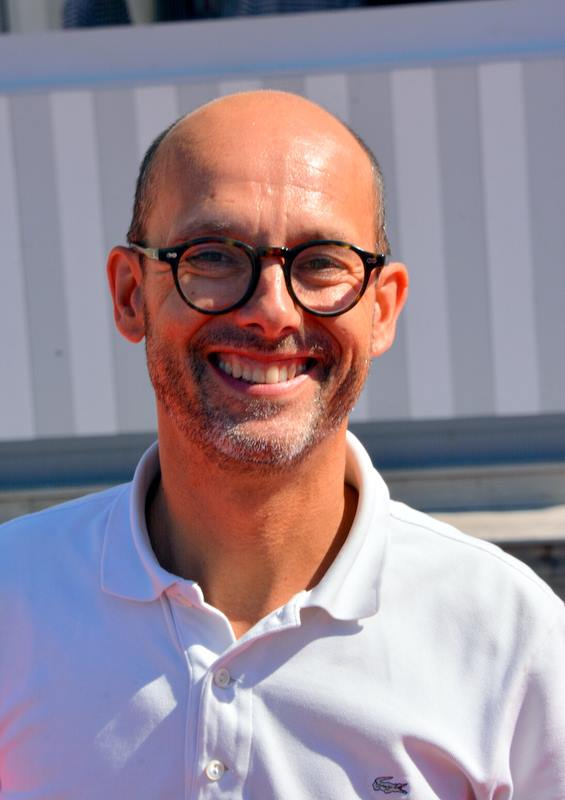
- Barthélemy in 2017
- Born: May 23, 1969 (age 56); La Paz, Bolivia
- Occupations: Actor; Film director Screenwriter

Maurice Barthélemy is a French actor, director and screenwriter.

== Career ==
Barthélemy started his career on stage in theater. In 2004, he wrote the film RRRrrrr!!!, directed by Alain Chabat. In 2012, he directed Pas très normales activités. The film received Jury Prize at the L'Alpe d'Huez Film Festival. He authored his debut book J'ai passé ma vie à chercher l'ouvre-boîtes, in 2001.

In 2021, he released his second book Fort comme un hypersensible.

== Filmography ==
=== Actor ===
==== Cinema ====
- 2022: Zaï zaï zaï zaï
- 2017: Les Ex
- 2016: Les Tuche 2
- 2012: Happiness Never Comes Alone
- 2010: Toutes les filles pleurent
- 2006: Essaye-moi
- 2004: Casablanca Driver
- 2002: The Race (2002 film)
- 2002: Asterix & Obelix: Mission Cleopatra
- 2001: Le Petit Poucet
- 1998: Trafic d'influence
- 1998: Serial Lover

===== TV =====
- 2019: Peplum (mini-série)
- 2002: Le 17
- 2002: Faut-il ?
- 2001: H (TV series)
- 2001: La Cape et l'Épée

=== Director ===
==== Cinema ====
- 2017: Les Ex
- 2013: Pas très normales activités
- 2011: Low Cost
- 2005: Papa
- 2001: Casablanca Driver

===== TV =====
- 2019: Peplum
