= Les Tuche =

- Theatrical release poster
- Directed by: Olivier Baroux
- Written by: Philippe Mechelen; Chantal Lauby; Olivier Baroux
- Produced by: Richard Grandpierre; Arthur (associate producer)
- Starring: Jean-Paul Rouve; Isabelle Nanty
- Cinematography: Arnaud Stefani
- Edited by: Richard Marizy
- Music by: Martin Rappeneau
- Production companies: Pathé; Eskwad
- Distributed by: Pathé
- Release date: 1 July 2011 (France)
- Running time: 95 minutes
- Country: France
- Language: French
- Budget: $12.4 million
- Box office: $13.9 million

Les Tuche is a 2011 French comedy film directed by Olivier Baroux. Three sequels had been released since the first opus.

In the film, a perpetually unemployed lower class family wins a fortune in a lottery. The nouveau riche family then attempts to fit in with the upper class in Monaco.

== Plot ==
The Tuche family is the stereotypical unemployed lower class French family.

Jeff (the father) is the proud descendant of the unemployment welfare inventor, and has never worked a day in his life. Out of his 3 kids, the youngest one seems to be extremely intelligent. This will come in handy when all of a sudden, they win €100 million in the lottery, and will attempt to fit in Monaco's upper class.

== Cast ==
- Jean-Paul Rouve as Jeff Tuche
- Isabelle Nanty as Cathy Tuche
- Claire Nadeau as Grandma Suze
- Théo Fernandez as Donald Tuche
- Sarah Stern as Stéphanie Tuche
- Pierre Lottin as Wilfried Tuche
- Fadila Belkebla as Mouna
- Karina Testa as Salma
- Philippe Lefebvre as Bickard
- Ralph Amoussou as Georges Diouf
- Jérôme Commandeur as Hermann
- Valérie Benguigui as Claudia
- Omar Sy as Bouzolles's monk
- Kad Merad as Bouzolles's fishmonger
- Pierre Bellemare as Bouzolles's mayor
- Olivier Baroux as Monnier

== Remake ==
An Italian remake entitled Poveri ma ricchi (lit. 'Poor but rich') was released in December 2016.
