= Olivier Baroux =

French actor, comedian, writer and director

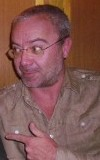
- Born: 5 January 1964 (age 61); Caen, France
- Occupation(s): Actor, comedian, director, writer
- Years active: 1996-present

Olivier Baroux (born 5 January 1964) is a French actor, comedian, writer and director who has acted both on stage and on screen. He first became known in forming with Kad Merad, the duo Kad & Olivier then went solo, while finding Kad regularly. Baroux's movies on Le Tuche is inspired by the hurdles of the American dream. He is married to his wife Coralie since 2009. Baroux appeared in Les Tuche 3.

== Filmography ==
=== Actor ===
Year	Title	Role	Director	Notes
1998	Les trente dernières minutes		Christophe Janin	TV series
1999	Un café... l'addition	The obnoxious guy	Félicie Dutertre; François Rabes	Short
1999	La grosse émission II, le retour	Host	Virginie Lovisone	TV show
1999	Jeu de vilains	Monsieur Chafouin	Hervé Eparvier	Short
2002	Making of		Olivier Baroux; Éric Lartigau	TV series
2003	Mais Qui a tué Pamela Rose?	Douglas Riper	Éric Lartigau (2)	
2003	Soyez prudents...		Lionel Gédébé	TV series
2003	Samedi soir en direct	Various Characters	Franck Broqua; Dominique Farrugia; Olivier Nakache; Eric Toledano	TV show
2003	The Car Keys	Himself	Laurent Baffie	
2004	RRRrrrr!!!	The narrator	Alain Chabat	
2004	Monde extérieur	A guest	David Rault	Short
2005	Once Upon a Time in the Oued	The Swiss passenger	Djamel Bensalah	
2005	Iznogoud	The genius Ouz	Patrick Braoudé	
2005	Toilet Zone	Various Characters	Olivier Baroux (2)	TV series
2006	Un ticket pour l'espace	Beaulieu	Éric Lartigau (3)	
2006	Star Trek... ou presque		Romain Protat	TV movie
2007	Santa Closed	The mustache man	Douglas Attal	Short
2007	Big City	The Sherif	Djamel Bensalah (2)	
2009	Neuilly sa mère!	M. Boulègue	Gabriel Julien-Laferrière	
2011	Monsieur Papa	Richard	Kad Merad	
2011	Les Tuche	Monnier	Olivier Baroux (3)	
2012	Les papas du dimanche	Léo	Louis Becker	
2012	Mais Qui a tué Pamela Rose?	Douglas Riper	Olivier Baroux (4); Kad Merad (2)	
2014	On a marché sur Bangkok		Olivier Baroux (5)	
2016	Les Tuche 2	Monnier	Olivier Baroux (6)	
2018	Les Tuche 3	Monnier	Olivier Baroux (7)	
2021	Les Tuche 4	Monnier	Olivier Baroux (8)	

=== Writer & Director ===
Year	Title	Director	Notes
1996	Jour de chance au bâtiment C	Lionel Gédébé	Short
2002	Making of	Olivier Baroux; Éric Lartigau	TV series
2003	Mais Qui a tué Pamela Rose?	Éric Lartigau (2)	
2003	Samedi soir en direct	Franck Broqua; Dominique Farrugia; Olivier Nakache; Eric Toledano	TV show
2004	Bertrand.çacom	Gaëtan Bevernaege	TV mini-series
2005	Toilet Zone	Olivier Baroux (2)	TV series
2006	Un ticket pour l'espace	Éric Lartigau (3)	
2006	Star Trek... ou presque	Romain Protat	TV movie
2007	Ce soir, je dors chez toi	Olivier Baroux (3)	
2009	Safari	Olivier Baroux (4)	
2010	L'Italien	Olivier Baroux (5)	
2011	Les Tuche	Olivier Baroux (6)	
2012	Mais Qui a re-tué Pamela Rose?	Olivier Baroux (7); Kad Merad	
2014	On a marché sur Bangkok	Olivier Baroux (8)	
2015	Entre amis	Olivier Baroux (9)	
2016	Les Tuche 2	Olivier Baroux (10)	
2018	Les Tuche 3 : Liberté, Égalité, FraterniTuche	Olivier Baroux (11)	
2019	Just a Gigolo	Olivier Baroux (12)	
2021	Les Tuche 4	Olivier Baroux (13)	
2022	Menteur	Olivier Baroux (14)	

=== Voice ===
Year	Title	Role	Director	Notes
2003	Brother Bear	Muche's voice	Aaron Blaise; Robert Walker	
2006	Brother Bear 2	Muche's voice	Ben Gluck	
