= French comedy films =

Comedy films produced in France

French comedy films are comedy films produced in France. Comedy is the most popular French genre in cinema.

Comic films began in significant numbers during the era of silent films, roughly 1895 to 1930. The visual humour of many of these silent films relied on slapstick and burlesque.

== Characteristics of French comedy films ==
French comedy films are very often social comedies, which differs largely from American comedies.

Since Rabbi Jacob [...], the pattern of community comedy remained the same: a "foreign element" (potentially "disruptive") integrates (often against their will!) a community (ethnic, religious, geographical, etc.). Past the cultural shock and the inevitable mutual rejection phase, the protagonists inevitably realize that despite their differences (and before the end of the film), they are made for each other ...

— Xavier Beaunieux, Quoi info

=== Social comedy ===
Culture shock, in several French comedies, oftentimes contain several 'clichés', which include:

- Religion – The Mad Adventures of Rabbi Jacob in the 1970s, and Serial (Bad) Weddings in the 2010s
- Social background – Life Is a Long Quiet River in the 1980s, and The Intouchables in the 2010s
- Difference of life between two places – Welcome to the Land of ch'tis in the 2000s
- Difference of life between two periods of time – The Visitors and The Visitors II: The Corridors of Time in the 1990s
- Difference of life in a parallel world – Jean-Philippe in the 2000s

=== Comedy duos ===
Some French comedy films are based on buddy film, in which two people with highly differing personalities are partnered up.

From the	Duos	Films
1950s	Louis de Funès and Bourvil	Poisson d'avril, La Grande Vadrouille, Le Corniaud
1950s	Fernandel and Gino Cervi	Don Camillo film series
1960s	Louis de Funès and Jean Marais	Fantômas film series
1960s	Louis de Funès and Michel Galabru	Le Gendarme film series
1970s	Gérard Depardieu and Patrick Dewaere	Les Valseuses
1970s	Michel Serrault and Ugo Tognazzi	la Cage aux folles film series
1980s	Duos with François Pignon and François Perrin	cf. François Pignon
1980s	Philippe Noiret and Thierry Lhermitte	Les Ripoux film series
1990s	Jean Reno and Christian Clavier	Les Visiteurs film series
1990s	Gérard Depardieu and Christian Clavier	Les Anges gardiens
1990s	Samy Naceri and Frédéric Diefenthal	Taxi film series
2000s	Kad Merad and Dany Boon	Bienvenue chez les Ch'tis, Supercondriaque
2000s	Éric Judor and Ramzy Bedia	La Tour Montparnasse Infernale, La Tour 2 contrôle infernale
2010s	François Cluzet and Omar Sy	The Intouchables

=== Other characteristics ===
French comedy films are often based on linguistic differences:

The things that make the French laugh involve linguistic somersaults that only work in their own language. Much of French humour is 'jeux de mots', untranslatable wordplays.

— The French have jokes, but do they have a sense of humour?, 20 décembre 2003, p. 75–76., The Economist

== History ==
=== French comedy before cinema ===
In Europe, the theatrical genre-like comedy developed in the Greco-Roman antiquity, much like the tragedy theaters built in the Roman Empire. During the Middle Ages, theater plays in the street, in the form of mystery plays, fabliaux, farces, soties and mimes were more or less inspired by antique survivals genres like Atellan.

In France during the 17th century under Louis XIV, the Italian influence and Molière began to recognize the comedy theater as an art in itself and not as a subgenre compared to the tragedy. From the 18th to the 19th century, comedy would continue to incorporate opera and comédie-ballet and become opéra comique. Comedy would also inspire the Operetta (Offenbach) in the middle of the 19th century. At the beginning of the 20th century, operettas were transformed into musical theatre. Bourvil and Fernandel started as operetta singers while Louis de Funès started as a music-hall pianist.

=== Beginning of cinema ===
Pantomimes cartoons by Reynaud

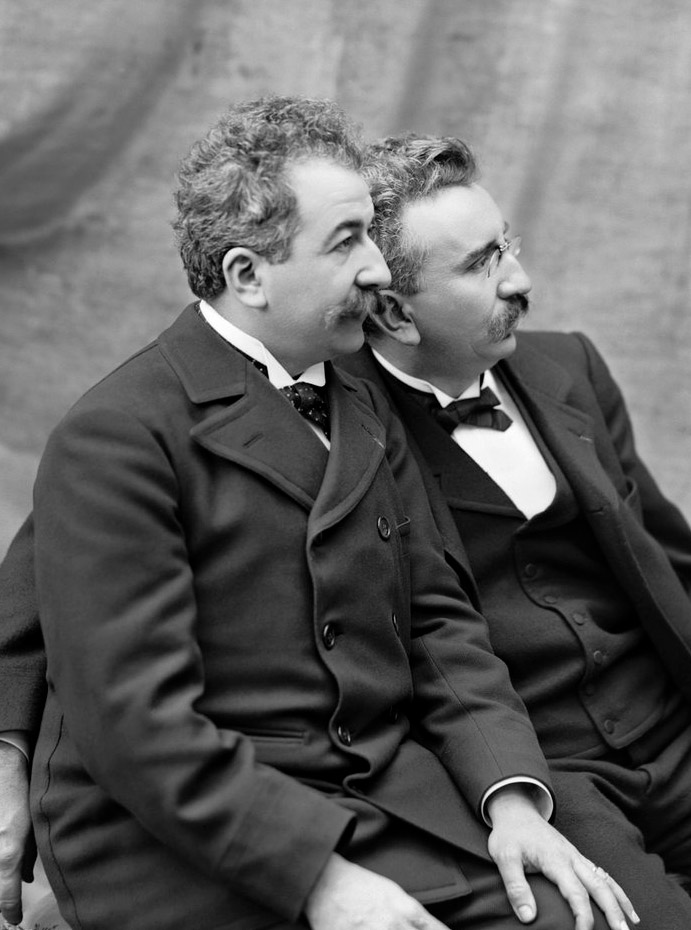
Fratelli Lumiere

In 1892, before cinema was created, Émile Reynaud recognized several comedy cartoons, including Le Clown et ses chiens. Comic films began to appear in significant numbers during the era of silent films, placed from 1895 to 1930. The visual humour of many of these silent films relied on slapstick and burlesque. A very early comedy short was Watering the Gardener (1895) by the Lumière brothers. In his native France and throughout the world, Max Linder was a major comic feature and might qualify as the first true film star.

Georges Méliès, from theatre, created the first studio de cinéma. He also created many silent comedies. He had a homage in 2011 with the movie Hugo.

During the World War I, America obtained the monopoly of comedy movies with the 'silent film' (Charlie Chaplin, Laurel and Hardy) Only after sound was integrated into these performances (The Jazz Singer was released in 1927 in US) that comedy films started being produced in France from the 1930s.

=== Interwar and occupation ===
When the sound entered cinema in 1927, comedy films returned to popularity, due to dialogue now being available for usage.

As the majority of France lived in rural areas during the 1930s, most films took place in similar areas.

=== 1940s to 1970s ===
After the Second World War, French society went under many changes during the 1940s to the 1970s, and thus it had a big impact on the comedies of this period. A number of French comedians were able to find an English speaking audience in this period, including Fernandel, Bourvil, Louis de Funès and Jacques Tati.

=== 1970s to 1990s ===
At the beginning of the 1970s, new actors from the baby-boomer generation starred in comedy films. Some examples would be Gérard Depardieu, the Splendid troupe, Daniel Auteuil, Daniel Prévost, and Coluche.

==== Le Splendid ====
The 1970s to 1990s corresponded to the golden age of comedies created and played by le Splendid which have been very famous in the theatre industry.

==== 1970s to 1980s ====
Comedies from the era tackled new social phenomena and were meant to provoke or shock audiences.

Provocation is present in multiple films, such as Going Places, La Grande Bouffe, Les Babas Cool, and Menage. In Santa Claus is a bastard, Santa Claus (who is traditionally portrayed as calm) is highly violent and vulgar, and brandishes a gun.

==== 1980s to 2000s ====
A new introduction of Francis Veber's concept arose during this period. 'François Pignon' and 'Francois Perrin' symbolized the stupider and more naive man triumphing over the smarter and "stronger" man due to luck.

=== 2000s to present ===
The 2000s correspond to a transition: indeed, the Splendid troupe generation of the 1970s tends to give over to newcomers (Dany Boon, Jamel Debbouze, Omar Sy) who have become famous with 'one man shows'.
