= The Dream Team (2012 film) =

- Theatrical release poster
- French: Les seigneurs
- Directed by: Olivier Dahan
- Written by: Olivier Dahan; Isaac Sharry; Marc de Chauveron; Philippe de Chauveron
- Produced by: Isaac Sharry
- Starring: José García; Jean-Pierre Marielle; Franck Dubosc; Gad Elmaleh; Joeystarr; Ramzy Bedia; Omar Sy
- Cinematography: Alex Lamarque
- Edited by: Richard Marizy
- Music by: Guillaume Roussel
- Production companies: Vito Films; TF1 Films
- Distributed by: Warner Bros. Pictures
- Release date: 26 September 2012
- Running time: 97 minutes
- Country: France
- Language: French

The Dream Team (French: Les seigneurs) is a 2012 French comedy film directed by Olivier Dahan.

== Plot ==
Patrick Orbéra (José García), a former footballer who turned alcoholic enlists his old teammates to the local team to raise money and save jobs.

== Cast ==
- José García as Patrick Orbéra
- Jean-Pierre Marielle as Titouan Leguennec
- Franck Dubosc as David Léandri
- Gad Elmaleh as Rayane Ziani
- Joeystarr as Shaheef Berda
- Ramzy Bedia as Marandella
- Omar Sy as Wéké N'Dogo
- Frédérique Bel as Floria
- Chantal Neuwirth asNénène
- Jean Reno as Himself
- Claudia Tagbo as Fatou N'Dogo
- Riton Liebman as The bailiff
- Arnaud Henriet as The lawyer
