= Édouard Baer =

French actor and filmmaker (born 1966)

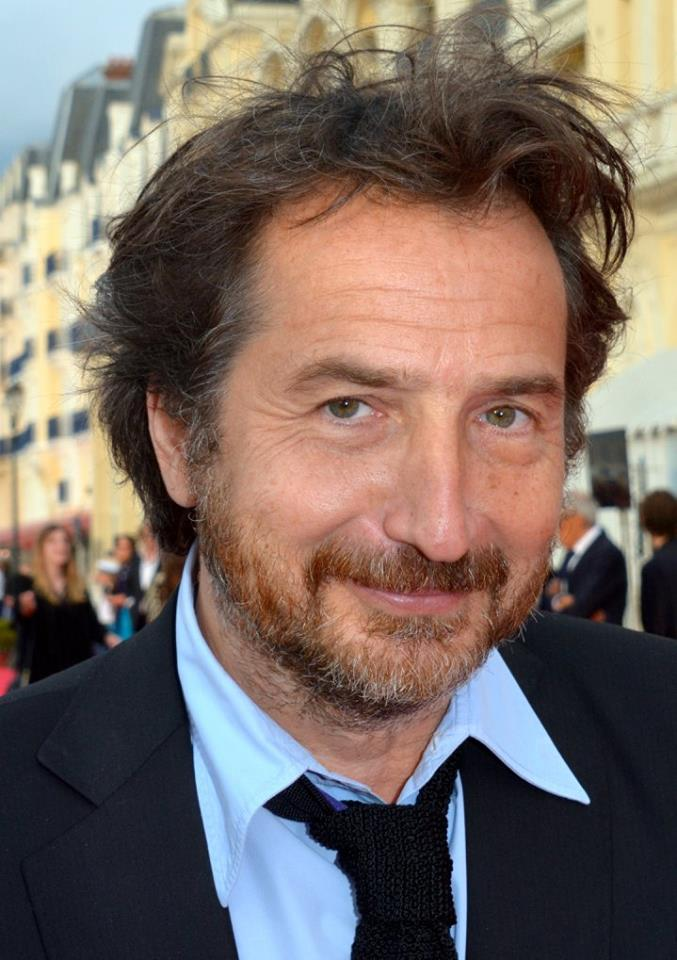
- Baer at the 2018 Cabourg Film Festival
- Born: 1 December 1966 (age 59); Boulogne-Billancourt, France
- Occupations: Actor, director, screenwriter, producer
- Years active: 1987–present

Édouard Baer (French: [edwaʁ bɛʁ]; born 1 December 1966) is a French actor, director, screenwriter, film producer and radio personality.

In 2001, Edouard Baer played the Egyptian scribe Otis in Alain Chabat's hit comedy Asterix and Obelix: Mission Cleopatra. Baer's character became a cult figure. The same year, he won the Molière for the male theatrical revelation 2001 for his role in the play Cravate club, written by Fabrice Roger-Lacan and directed by Isabelle Nanty.

In 2009, he participated in the French television programme Rendez-vous en terre inconnue.

== Theatre ==
Year	Title	Author	Director	Notes
1997	Le Goût de la hiérarchie	Édouard Baer	Édouard Baer	
2000–2001	Cravate club	Fabrice Roger-Lacan	Isabelle Nanty	Molière Award for Best Male Newcomer
2002–2004	Le Grand Mezze	Édouard Baer & François Rollin	Édouard Baer & François Rollin	
2006	La Folle et Véritable Vie de Luigi Prizzoti	Édouard Baer	Édouard Baer	Globe de Cristal Award for Best One Man Show
2007–2008	Looking for Mr Castang	Édouard Baer	Édouard Baer	
2008–2010	Un pedigree	Patrick Modiano	Édouard Baer	
2009–2010	Miam Miam	Édouard Baer	Édouard Baer	Globe de Cristal Award for Best Play; Nominated – Molière Award for Best Comedy
2012–2013	À la française	Édouard Baer	Édouard Baer	
2014–2016	La Porte à côté	Fabrice Roger-Lacan	Bernard Murat	
2016	Un pedigree	Patrick Modiano	Édouard Baer	
2021	Les élucubrations d'un homme soudain frappé par la grâce	Édouard Baer	Édouard Baer	

== Filmography ==
=== Actor ===
Year	Title	Role	Director	Notes
1989	Tribunal	Antoine Marin	Dominique Masson	TV series (1 episode)
1994	La folie douce	Edouard	Frédéric Jardin	
1994	Parlez après le signal sonore		Olivier Jahan	Short
1995	Raï		Thomas Gilou	
1995	Fast	The second boy-friend	Dante Desarthe	
1996	The Apartment	Theater Actor	Gilles Mimouni	
1996	Caméléone	The art critic	Benoît Cohen	
1996	Velvet 99	Velvet 99	Agnès Deygas & Thierry Kuntzel	Short
1996	15 sans billets		Samuel Tasinaje	Short
1996	Coeur de cible	Cyril Maury	Laurent Heynemann	TV movie
1997	Héroïnes	Francis	Gérard Krawczyk	
1997	Qui va Pino va sano	Robert Fontrobert	Fabrice Roger-Lacan	Short
1997	L'agence Lambert	Michael Lambert	Etienne Labroue	TV series (1 episode)
1999	Terror Firmer	French Cool Cat	Lloyd Kaufman	
1999	Rien sur Robert	Alain de Xantras	Pascal Bonitzer	
1999	Chico, notre homme à Lisbonne	Various	Édouard Baer	TV Short
2000	La bostella	Edouard	Édouard Baer	
2000	Les frères Soeur	Blaise	Frédéric Jardin	
2000	La chambre des magiciennes	Simon	Claude Miller	TV movie
2001	Alias Betty	Alex Basato	Claude Miller	Nominated – César Award for Best Supporting Actor
2001	God Is Great and I'm Not	François	Pascale Bailly	
2001	Demain et tous les jours après	Bruno	Bernard Stora	TV movie
2001	La cape et l'épée	The minstrel	Bernard Faroux	TV series (1 episode)
2002	Asterix & Obelix: Mission Cleopatra	Otis	Alain Chabat	
2002	Cravate club	Adrien	Frédéric Jardin	
2002	Edouard est marrant	Edouard Baer	Riton Liebman	Short
2002	Jean Moulin	A motorcycle	Yves Boisset	TV movie
2003	The Car Keys	Himself	Laurent Baffie	
2003	Le bison (et sa voisine Dorine)	Louis Le Bison	Isabelle Nanty	
2003	Tournez la page		Sophie Leys	Short
2003	Kelif et Deutsch à la recherche d'un emploi		Frédéric Berthe	TV series (1 episode)
2004	The Story of My Life	Raphaël Jullian	Laurent Tirard	
2004	À boire	Pierre-Marie Archambault	Marion Vernoux	
2004	Double Zéro	The male	Gérard Pirès	
2004	Milady	Viscount of Wardes	Josée Dayan	TV movie
2005	How Much Do You Love Me?	The upset man	Bertrand Blier	
2005	Akoibon	Daniel Stain	Édouard Baer	
2006	Les Brigades du Tigre	Inspector Pujol	Jérôme Cornuau	
2006	Je pense à vous	Hermann	Pascal Bonitzer	
2007	A Girl Cut in Two	Edouard	Claude Chabrol	
2007	Molière	Dorante	Laurent Tirard	
2007	J'ai toujours rêvé d'être un gangster	Gino	Samuel Benchetrit	
2007	Crosse	The drunk guy	Liova Jedlicki	Short
2008	Passe-passe	Darry Marzouki	Tonie Marshall	
2008	2 Alone in Paris	The priest	Ramzy Bedia & Eric Judor	
2008	Un monde à nous	Marc	Frédéric Balekdjian	
2009	Wild Grass	The narrator	Alain Resnais	
2009	The Barons	Jacques	Nabil Ben Yadir	
2010	An Ordinary Execution	Vassilli	Marc Dugain	
2010	Mon pote	Victor Gallien	Marc Esposito	
2010	HH, Hitler à Hollywood	Edouard Baer	Frédéric Sojcher	
2010	Le grand restaurant	A client	Gérard Pullicino	TV movie
2011	Chicken with Plums	Azraël	Marjane Satrapi & Vincent Paronnaud	
2012	Asterix and Obelix: God Save Britannia	Asterix	Laurent Tirard	
2013	Cupcakes	Édouard	Eytan Fox	
2013	Turf	Freddy	Fabien Onteniente	
2013	Le grand retournement	The trader	Gérard Mordillat	
2013	Les invincibles	Stéphane Darcy	Frédéric Berthe	
2015	Phantom Boy	Alex	Jean-Loup Felicioli & Alain Gagnol	
2015	Encore heureux	Sam Ogiel	Benoît Graffin	
2016	Open at Night	Luigi	Édouard Baer	
2018	Mademoiselle de Joncquières	Marquis des Arcis	Emmanuel Mouret	Nominated – César Award for Best Actor
2018	Raoul Taburin	Hervé Figougne	Pierre Godeau	
2018	C'est quoi ton nom	Edouard	Emilie Barbault, Sarah Barbault	TV series
2019	Black Snake: La légende du serpent noir	Henry Thouvenel	Thomas N'Gijol, Karole Rocher	
2019	La lutte des classes	Paul Clément	Michel Leclerc	
2019	Astro Kid	Buck (voice)	Éric Tosti	
2019	Polina i tayemnyzia kinostudiyi	Chemist	Olias Barco	
2020	How to Be a Good Wife	André Grunvald	Martin Provost	
2020	Capitaine Marleau		Josée Dayan	TV series
2023	Adieu Paris	Édouard	Édouard Baer	
2023	Daaaaaalí!	Salvador Dalí	Quentin Dupieux	
2024	All Stirred Up! (Tous toqués!)	Victor	Manon Briand	

=== Filmmaker ===
Year	Title	Role	Notes
1987	Nulle part ailleurs	Writer	TV series
1997	Qui va Pino va sano	Writer	Short
1997	L'agence Lambert	Writer	TV series
1999	Chico, notre homme à Lisbonne	Director & writer	TV Short
2000	La bostella	Director, writer & Delegate producer	
2000	Les frères Soeur	Writer	
2003	Le grand plongeoir	Writer	TV Mini-Series
