= List of H episodes =

The French television series H was broadcast in 71 episodes over 4 seasons from October 24, 1998 to April 20, 2002. The series was created by Abd-el-Kader Aoun, Xavier Matthieu and Éric Judor.

The series narrative follows the life in a hospital located in Trappes (near Paris), where three employees, Djamel (Jamel Debbouze), Aymé (Éric Judor) and Sabri (Ramzy Bedia) have their own special conception of work.

== Overview ==
| Season | Episodes | Originally released | |
| Season | Episodes | First released | Last released |
|---|---|---|---|
| 1 | 20 | 1998 | 1999 |
| 2 | 20 | 1999 | 2000 |
| 3 | 20 | 2000 | 2001 |
| 4 | 11 | 2002 | 2002 |

== Episodes ==
=== Season 1: 1998–1999 ===
| No. overall | No. in series | Title | Directed by | Written by | Original release date |
|---|---|---|---|---|---|
| 1 | 1 | "L'anniversaire (The Birthday)" | Édouard Molinaro | Abdel Kader, Xavier Matthieu, Éric Lavaine, Éric Judor | October 24, 1998 |
Sabri decides to throw a party for his birthday but forgets to invite Clara. For fear of sleeping alone, Aymé convinces Béa to spend the night with him and they end up sleeping together.
| 2 | 2 | "Trop moche pour être belle (Too ugly to be beautiful)" | Édouard Molinaro | Abdel Kader, Xavier Matthieu, Éric Lavaine, Éric Judor, Jean-Paul Bathany | October 31, 1998 |
Aymé has a crush on a girl named Léa and makes her best friend Sylvie stay longer in the hospital. Sabri has to deal with his colleague's horrible breath. Djamel is afraid that Béa will never return the 50 franks he has lent her.
| 3 | 3 | "Un manuscrit (A manuscript)" | Édouard Molinaro | Jean-Paul Bathany, Alexandre Pesle | November 7, 1998 |
A suicidal patient gives Aymé a manuscript of the book he has just written, but Aymé immediately loses it. The writer believes Aymé didn't like his book and jumps through the window. In order to impress Sabri, Jamel tries to break up with a beautiful nurse he doesn't even know. Guest starring Bruno Solo.
| 4 | 4 | "Un meilleur copain (A best friend)" | Édouard Molinaro | Jean-Paul Bathany, Bruno Nicolini, Frédéric Proust | November 14, 1998 |
Sabri is very impressed by a stunt performer named Jet. Aymé is jealous and pretends to be "best friends" with another colleague. Djamel misses a day at work to go to a Mary Ingalls's memorial.
| 5 | 5 | "Une grossesse (A pregnancy)" | Charles Némès | Meddi Athia, Claire Lemaréchal, Éric Lusseault, Alexandre Pesle, Bruno Nicolini | November 21, 1998 |
Béa accepts the last request of a man about to die, that is to sleep with him. Since then, she is convinced that she is carrying his child. Djamel and Sabri rent from an art photographer Professor Strauss's collection of statues of stars.
| 6 | 6 | "No clowning" | Édouard Molinaro | Abdel Kader, Xavier Matthieu, Éric Lavaine, Éric Judor | November 28, 1998 |
To distract sick children, Clara invites a clown to the hospital. However, Sabri soon discovers that the latter is racist. Aymé decides to move out of the city.
| 7 | 7 | "Une thérapie de couple (A therapy for couples)" | Édouard Molinaro | Christina Alerano, Stéphane Keller | December 5, 1998 |
The judo European champion is hospitalised after her last fight. Seeing her haematomae, Clara thinks she has been beaten by her husband and tells the hospital psychologist about it, who in turn decides that Clara's mistake is due to her violent relationship with Djamel, and tries to talk the two of them into a therapy. Sabri is rehearsing his part as an ultra-violent drug dealer. Béa decides to quit her intellectual readings to become a real woman.
| 8 | 8 | "Une belle maman (A stepmother)" | Charles Némès | Henri Joko, Bruno Nicolini, Frédéric Proust, Charlie Schlingo | December 12, 1998 |
Clara's mother believes Aymé is her daughter's fiancé. But she finds him attractive and starts flirting with him... Sabri pretends to be a vegetarian to seduce a pretty nurse, herself a health nut. Béa convinces Djamel to start a union within the hospital.
| 9 | 9 | "Une promesse (A promise)" | Édouard Molinaro | Jean-Paul Bathany, Alexandre Pesle | December 26, 1998 |
Djamel's sister, Farida, makes an internship in the hospital. Djamel forbids Aymé to flirt with her. Sabri convinces himself he is a cat and starts acting like one. A depressed Professor Strauss begs Clara to convince his wife to come back to him.
| 10 | 10 | "Une vie de chien (A dog's life)" | Édouard Molinaro | Abdel Kader, Xavier Matthieu, Eric Lavaine | January 2, 1999 |
Djamel brings his enormous dog, Jean-Pierre, to live in the hospital "for a while". Inevitably, a big mess ensues. Sabri finally gets a part in a play, but refuses to admit it is as a homosexual.
