= Le prince Aladin =

Single by Black M and Kev Adams
- Released: 11 September 2015
- Genre: Hip hop, trap
- Length: 3:35
- Label: Wati B, Jive Epic
- Songwriters: Alpha Diallo, Kev Adams

Black M singles chronology
"Black Shady Part. 3" (2014)	"Le prince Aladin" (2015)	"Dans ma rue" (2015)

Music video
- Le prince Aladin on YouTube

"Le prince Aladin" is a song by rapper Black M with Kev Adams recorded trap single and the soundtrack to the film Les Nouvelles Aventures d'Aladin.

== Music video ==
The music video for "Le prince Aladin" was uploaded to YouTube on September 11, 2015 at a total length of three minutes and fifty-four seconds. The video gained more than 47 million page views in three months, and more than 305,000 likes.

== Live performance ==
Black M with Kev Adams act on the TV show Vendredi tout est permis on 12 September 2015.

== Charts ==
Chart (2015)	Peak; position
Belgium Urban (Ultratop Flanders)	34
Belgium (Ultratop 50 Wallonia)	5
France (SNEP)	3
Switzerland (Media Control Romandy)	7
