= Kev Adams =

French humorist and actor (born 1991)

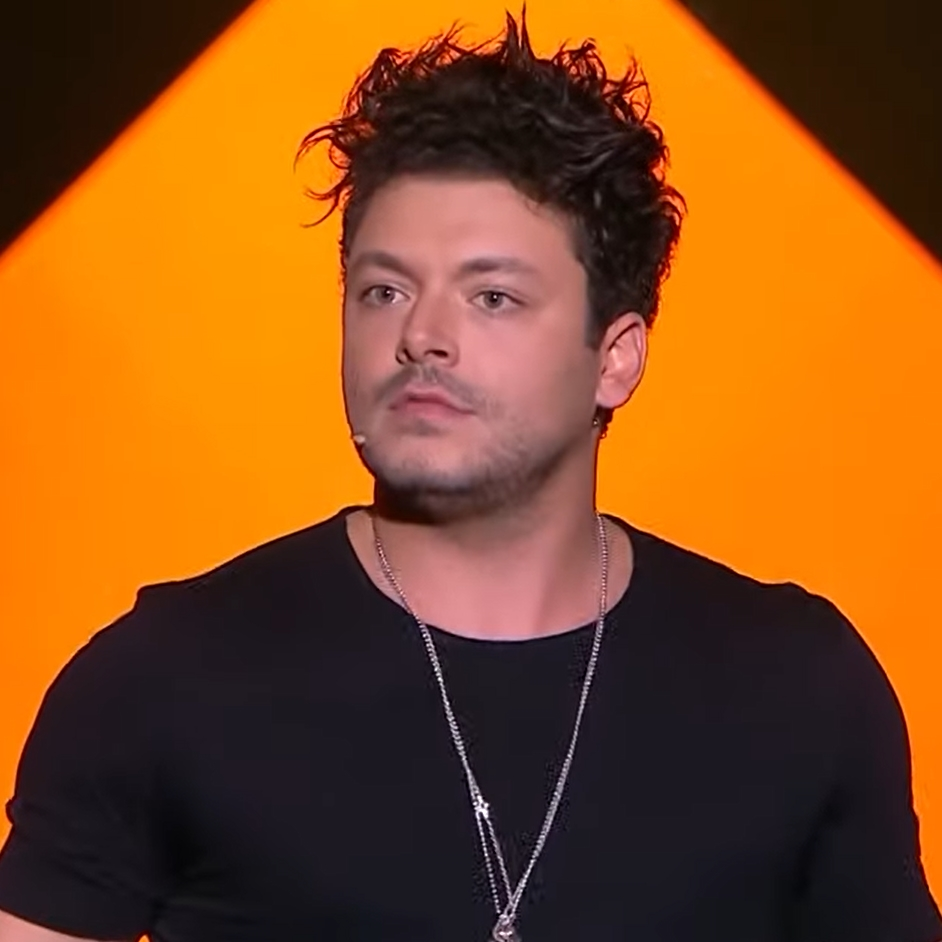
- Adams, 2018
- Born: Kévin Smadja; 1 July 1991 (age 35); Paris, France
- Occupations: Comedian, actor, screenwriter, film producer

Kev Adams or Kev' Adams (born Kevin Smadja; 1 July 1991) is a French comedian, actor, screenwriter and film producer.

== Early life ==
Adams was born in 1991 in the 16th district of Paris. His father is a real estate agent of Algerian Jewish descent and his mother, of Tunisian Jewish descent, works in finance. He has two younger brothers, Noam and Lirone. He began taking theater classes at the age of seven. In 2009, Adams completed his French Baccalaureate in literature, and enrolled in law at the University of Paris X-Nanterre while simultaneously pursuing his acting career. He claimed that it was, "extremely difficult, nearly impossible, to balance both."

== Career ==
In 2009, Adams was spotted by Elisa Soussan, Anne Roumanoff's producer, who invited him to perform at her Carte Blanche show at the Olympia (Paris). This stage performance was broadcast on Paris Première. Following this event, Adams was offered to be the opening act of a Gad Elmaleh show at the Palais des Sports. His first one-man show, The Young Man Show, first ran in Paris in 2009 at the Théâtre Le Temple and then continued at the Palais des Glaces before touring France. The tour ended in Switzerland on 22 July 2012, during the Paléo Festival de Nyon. He then performed a show called Test... Voilà, Voilà! at the Bataclan from 27 November to 31 December 2013.

As of May 2014, Adams has more than 3 million fans on Facebook and more than 1 million followers on Twitter and in 2017 more 4 million followers on instagram.

From September 2010 to February 2011, Adams was a contestant on the TV program On n'demande qu'à en rire ("We just want to laugh at it", literally "We ask only to laugh at it") hosted by Laurent Ruquier. He left the show voluntarily to dedicate himself to the Soda television series, in which he plays a major role. Soda depicts the daily life of three boys and includes guest stars such as La Fouine and Amel Bent. Since the summer of 2011, the series has been broadcast on M6, and on W9 in 2012. Season three close the series in 2015.

The same year he has his biggest box office successes with Serial Teachers, as the almost-school dropout and his adventures with the worst teachers of France, and The New Adventures of Aladdin, as one of the thieves caught by the children in the midst of a robbery on Christmas Eve.

In 2018, he created the animated series Kev's World ("Le Monde selon Kev"). He also voiced himself in the original French version.

== Filmography ==
Year	Title	Role	Director	Notes
2000	Cours toujours	Young Paco	Dante Desarthe	
2008	LOL (Laughing Out Loud)	Extra	Lisa Azuelos	
2011	The Day I Saw Your Heart	Comedian	Jennifer Devoldère	
2011-15	Soda	Adam	Jean Michel Bensoussan & Nath Dumont	TV series (692 episodes)
2012	The Lorax	Ted Wiggins (voice)	Chris Renaud	French dub
2013	The Croods	Guy (voice)	Chris Sanders and Kirk DeMicco	French dub
2013	Serial Teachers	Thierry Boulard	Pierre-François Martin-Laval	
2013	Kidon	Facebook	Emmanuel Naccache	
2013	C'est la crise		David Freymond	TV series (1 episode)
2014	Fiston	Alex	Pascal Bourdiaux	
2014	Soda : Un trop long week-end	Adam	Jean Michel Bensoussan (2)	TV movie
2015	Serial Teachers 2	Thierry Boulard	Pierre-François Martin-Laval (2)	
2015	The New Adventures of Aladdin	Aladin / Sam	Arthur Benzaquen	
2015	Soda : le rêve américain	Adam	Nath Dumont (2)	TV movie
2016	Amis publics	Léo Perez	Edouard Pluvieux	
2016	Finding Dory	Bailey (voice)	Andrew Stanton	French dub
2017	Un sac de billes	Ferdinand	Christian Duguay	
2017	Gangsterdam	Ruben Jablonski	Romain Lévy	
2017	Rock'n Roll	Himself	Guillaume Canet	
2017	Coup de foudre	The Man	Guy Lecluyse	Short
2017	Tout la haut	Scott	Serge Hazanavicius	
2017	Tall Tales from the Magical Garden of Antoon Krings	Loulou Le Pou (voice)	Antoon Krings and Arnaud Bouron	
2018	The Spy Who Dumped Me	Bitteauto Driver Lukas	Susanna Fogel	First U.S. film role
2018	Alad'2	Aladin / Sam	Lionel Steketee	Sequel The New Adventures of Aladdin
2018	Kev's World	Kev (voice)		Creator
2019	The Addams Family	Gomez Addams (voice)	Conrad Vernon and Greg Tiernan	French dub
2021	The Addams Family 2	Gomez Addams (voice)	Conrad Vernon and Greg Tiernan	French dub

== Discography ==
Year	Title	Peak positions		Certification	Album
Year	Title	FR	BEL (Wa)	Certification	Album
2015	"Le prince Aladin" (Black M feat. Kev Adams)	3	22		
2015	"Yallah Yallah (L'arrivée d'Aladin)"	35			
