= 2 Alone in Paris =

- Theatrical release poster
- Directed by: Éric Judor; Ramzy Bedia
- Written by: Éric Judor; Ramzy Bedia; Philippe Lefebvre; Lionel Dutemple
- Produced by: Alain Attal
- Starring: Éric Judor; Ramzy Bedia; Élodie Bouchez; Benoît Magimel; Kristin Scott Thomas; Omar Sy; François Damiens; Édouard Baer
- Cinematography: Philippe Piffeteau
- Edited by: Jean-Christophe Hym; Sébastien de Sainte-Croix
- Music by: Cyrille Aufort; Pierre Sarkozy
- Production companies: Les Productions du Trésor; M6 Films; TF1 Films Production; 4 Mecs en Baskets Production; 4 Mecs à Lunettes Production
- Distributed by: Warner Bros. Pictures
- Release date: 25 June 2008
- Running time: 92 minutes
- Country: France
- Language: French

2 Alone in Paris (French: Seuls Two) is a 2008 French comedy film directed by and starring Éric Judor and Ramzy Bedia.

== Cast ==
- Éric Judor as Gervais
- Ramzy Bedia as Curtis / Abdel Kader
- Élodie Bouchez as Juliette
- Benoît Magimel as The Commissioner
- Kristin Scott Thomas as The Antique Dealer
- Omar Sy as Sammy Bouglioni
- François Damiens as the captain of the opposing curling team
- Édouard Baer as the priest at the funeral
