= Arnaud Ducret =

French actor and comedian

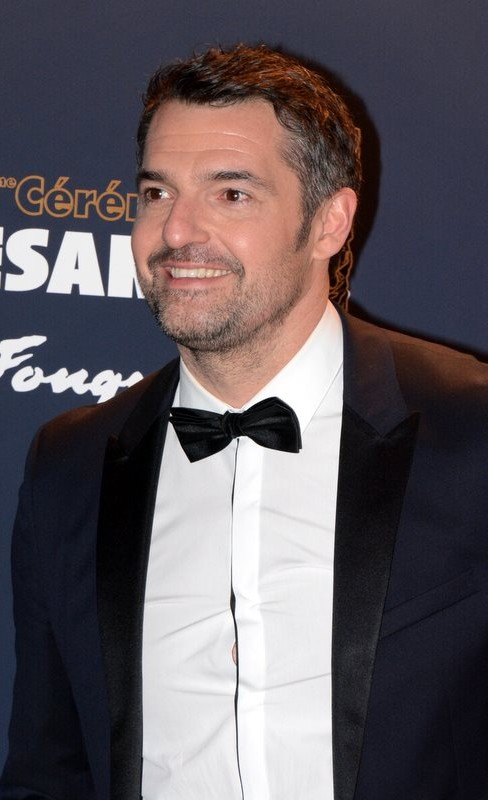
- Arnaud Ducret in 2017
- Born: 6 December 1978 (age 47); Rouen, France
- Occupations: Actor, Comedian

Arnaud Ducret (born 6 December 1978) is a French actor and comedian.

== Life and career ==
In 2013, he plays Gaby alongside Alix Poisson (Isa) in Parents mode d'emploi, a series broadcast on France 2 that shows him a very large audience. The same year, he plays Eric in Serial Teachers and Serial Teachers 2.

== Filmography ==
Year	Title	Role	Director	Notes
2008	Fortunes	Mike Moreno	Stéphane Meunier	TV movie
2009	Adieu De Gaulle adieu	Jacques Chirac	Laurent Herbiet	TV movie
2010	A vos caisses !	Antoine Podayac	Pierre Isoard	TV movie
2010	Un divorce de chien	Xavier	Lorraine Lévy	TV movie
2011	Une vie meilleure	Nadia's boss	Cédric Kahn	
2011	Fortunes	Mike Moreno	Stéphane Meunier	TV series (7 episodes)
2012	L'oncle Charles	José	Étienne Chatiliez	
2012	La planète des cons	Gilles Galud	Charlie Dupont & Gilles Galud	TV movie
2012	Le sang de la vigne	Cazeviel	Marc Rivière	TV series (1 episode)
2013	Serial Teachers	Éric	Pierre-François Martin-Laval	
2013	Love Is in the Air	Franck	Alexandre Castagnetti	
2013	Manipulations	Prosecutor	Laurent Herbiet	TV movie
2013	Fais pas ci, fais pas ça	Michel	Jérôme Navarro	TV series (1 episode)
2013	L'Attaque	Alex Nony	Alexandre Pidoux	TV series (3 episodes)
2013	C'est la crise	Arnaud	David Freymond	TV series (9 episodes)
2013–2018	Parents mode d'emploi	Gabriel Martinet	Christophe Campos, Marie-Hélène Copti, ...	TV series (732 episodes)
2014	Le chant des sirènes	Kevin	Laurent Herbiet	TV movie
2014	Enfin te voilà!	Sergent Rousseau	Pascal Rétif	TV series (1 episode)
2015	Serial Teachers 2	Éric	Pierre-François Martin-Laval	
2016	Roommates Wanted	Paul-Gérard Langlois	François Desagnat	
2017	The New Adventures of Cinderella	Prince Marco	Lionel Steketee	
2017	L'embarras du choix	Etienne Chevallier	Éric Lavaine	
2017	Les ex	Father Laurent	Maurice Barthélemy	
2017	Speed/Dating	Jacques Traveine	Daniel Brunet & Nicolas Douste	Short
2018	Gaston Lagaffe	Joseph Longtarin	Pierre-François Martin-Laval	
2018	Les dents, pipi et au lit	Antoine	Emmanuel Gillibert	
2018	Monsieur Je-Sais-Tout	Vincent Barteau	Stéphan Archinard & François Prévôt-Leygonie	
2019	Divorce Club		Michaël Youn	Post-Production
2019	Mine de rien		Mathias Mlekuz	Filming

== Theater ==
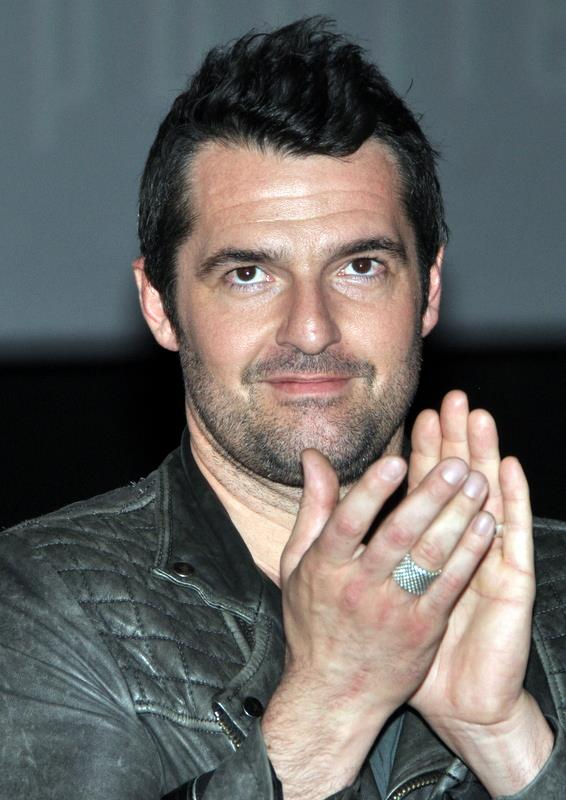
Arnaud Ducret in 2013

Year	Title	Author	Director
2010–13	Spamalot	Eric Idle	Pierre-François Martin-Laval
2012	Pareil… mais en mieux	Arnaud Ducret	Karim Adda
2012–13	Je m'rends	Arnaud Ducret	Karim Adda
2014–16	Arnaud Ducret vous fait plaisir	Arnaud Ducret	Etienne De Balasy
