= H (TV series) =

- Genre: Comedy
- Created by: Abd-el-Kader Aoun; Éric Judor; Xavier Matthew
- Written by: Éric Lavaine
- Directed by: Éric Lartigau
- Starring: Éric Judor; Jamel Debbouze; Ramzy Bedia; Catherine Benguigui; Sophie Mounicot; Jean-Luc Bideau
- Theme music composer: DJ Abdel
- Country of origin: France
- Original language: French
- No. of seasons: 4
- No. of episodes: 71 (list)

Production
- Running time: 22 minutes
- Production company: Canal+

Original release
- Network: Canal+
- Release: October 24, 1998 – April 20, 2002

H is a French sitcom with seventy-one 22-minute episodes. The series was created by Abd-el-Kader Aoun, Xavier Matthew and Éric Judor, and produced by Phillippe Berthe, Édouard Molinaro, Jean-Luc Moreau and Charles Némès. It ran from 24 October 1998 to 20 April 2002 on Canal+. In Canada, it is shown weekly on TV5.

The title "H" comes from the three words that characterize the series: Humour, Histoire et Hôpital (Humour, Story and Hospital).

== Premise ==
The lives of the carelessly incompetent medical team at a hospital in the Parisian suburbs explode in surreal humour as they go about their daily duties.

== Cast ==
- Jamel Debbouze as Jamel Driddi
- Éric Judor as Aymé Cesaire
- Ramzy Bedia as Sabri Saïd
- Catherine Benguigui as Béatrice "Béa" Goldberg (seasons 1 and 2)
- Sophie Mounicot as Clara Saulnier
- Jean-Luc Bideau as Professor Maximilien « Max » Strauss
- Linda Hardy as Charlotte, Professor Strauss' daughter (season 3)
- Edgar Givry as the Director of the hospital

=== Guest appearances ===
In four seasons, many notable French actors appeared in guest starring roles or cameos.

- Marie-Christine Adam as Philippe's Mother
- Bernard Blancan as The Guide Michelin Inspector
- Richard Bohringer as St. Peter
- Anne Charrier as Jessica
- Thomas Chabrol as The sales representative
- Gerard Darmon as the police chief
- Mouss Diouf as a thief
- Gustave Kervern as Clément Dufresne
- Lorànt Deutsch as a young intern
- Jean-Claude Dreyfus as Cyril Strauss
- Claire Nadeau as Eliane Strauss
- Guilaine Londez as Emilie
- Augustin Legrand as a skinhead
- Serge Riaboukine as The Godfather
- Joey Starr as the devil
- Jean-Paul Rouve as The steward
- Élise Tielrooy as The psychologist
- Vincent Desagnat as A caregiver
- Danièle Évenou as The inspector
- Frédéric Bouraly
- Thierry Henry
- Philippe Khorsand
- Urbain Cancelier
- Pierre Palmade
- Patrick Poivre d'Arvor
- Micheline Presle
- Christine Ockrent
- Jean Dell
- Richard Gotainer

== Characters ==
- Djamel Driddi - Switchboard operator in Orthopedics. He is ready to do anything to earn money and willing to place himself in difficult situations: cross-dressing, selling rats, trafficking expired pizzas in the hospital, disguising himself as Santa Claus, etc. He is a pathological liar and often uses the expression "dis-moi pas que c’est pas vrai" (Tell me not that it's not true!)
- Aymé Césaire - a male nurse. He is the son of an Austrian woman (who ends up having an affair with Sabri) and a man from Guadeloupe. He is a cowardly hypochondriac, often cynical and arrogant. He is obsessed with women and suffers from hyper-sexuality. He claims to be fluent in "Ebonics" but is instead fluent in German. He is named after the Martiniquais poet, Aimé Césaire.
- Sabri Saïd - a stretcher-bearer and later a barman at the bar "Barbylone" near the hospital. Although a comic character, he can be a "bad guy" : he poisons Aymé, Clara, and Professor Strauss, and locks Jamel out on his balcony.
- Clara Saulnier - the chief nurse in Orthopedics. An older woman, she is domineering and persistent. Before becoming a nurse, she was an alcoholic prostitute and porn star. She shares a love-hate relationship with Aymé.
- Beatrice "Béa" Goldberg - a doctor. She is a nice but unattractive young woman. She can also be considered the most "normal" of the characters. Unlucky in love, she finally falls for Jean-François Nguyen, a French-Vietnamese lawyer, but their wedding is broken up on the day of the marriage.
- Professor Maximilien "Max" Strauss - Head surgeon. He is obsessed with sports, collectibles, money, and various sexual fetishes. Because of his incompetence, he is the defendant in several malpractice suits. He is unable to manage his group (who spend most of the day goofing off) and cannot remember their names correctly. He has a daughter named Charlotte, and the show hints that he may be the son of Hitler.
- Edgar - the hospital administrator. Intelligent and ambitious, his plans are always thwarted by Professor Strauss, Aymé, or Sabri.

== List of episodes ==
Season	Episodes	Originally aired
1	20	1998 – 1999
2	20	1999 – 2000
3	20	2000 – 2001
4	11	2002

== Distribution ==
A DVD featuring the "Best of H" as well as a box set featuring all four seasons have been released. The full series was streamable on Netflix.
