= Bled Number One =

2006 film

- Directed by: Rabah Ameur-Zaïmeche
- Written by: Rabah Ameur-Zaïmeche; Louise Thermes
- Produced by: Rabah Ameur-Zaïmeche
- Starring: Meryem Serbah
- Cinematography: Lionel Sautier; Hakim Si Ahmed
- Edited by: Nicolas Bancilhon
- Music by: Rodolphe Burger
- Distributed by: Les Films du Losange
- Release date: 7 June 2006
- Running time: 100 minutes
- Country: France
- Language: French

Bled Number One is a 2006 French drama film directed by Rabah Ameur-Zaïmeche. It was screened in the Un Certain Regard section at the 2006 Cannes Film Festival.

== Cast ==
- Meryem Serbah - Louisa
- Abel Jafri - Bouzid
- Rabah Ameur-Zaïmeche - Kamel
- Meriem Ameur-Zaïmeche - La mère
- Larkdari Ameur-Zaïmeche - Le père
- Soheb Ameur-Zaïmeche - Le fils de Louisa
- Farida Ouchani - Loubna
- Ramzy Bedia - Le mari de Louisa
