= Bacon on the Side =

- Theatrical release poster
- French: Il reste du jambon?
- Directed by: Anne Depétrini
- Written by: Anne Depétrini
- Starring: Ramzy Bedia; Anne Marivin
- Distributed by: Gaumont
- Release date: 27 October 2010
- Running time: 90 minutes
- Country: France
- Language: French
- Budget: $6.8 million
- Box office: $6.1 million

Bacon on the Side (French: Il reste du jambon?; lit. 'Is there ham?') is a French romantic comedy film, released in 2010. Written and directed by Anne Depétrini, the film stars Ramzy Bedia and Anne Marivin as Djalil Boudaoud and Justine Lacroix, a surgeon and a television reporter who enter a romantic relationship despite the objections of their families to the cultural gap.

== Cast ==
- Ramzy Bedia as Djalil Boudaoud
- Anne Marivin as Justine Lacroix
- Marie-France Pisier as Nicole Lacroix
- Mohamed Fellag as Mahmoud Boudaoud
- Biyouna as Houria Boudaoud
- Jean-Luc Bideau as Charles Lacroix
- Géraldine Nakache as Sophie
- Leïla Bekhti as Anissa Boudaoud
- Arnaud Henriet as Mathieu
- Alex Lutz as Benoît Dubreuil
- Éric Judor as The vigil
- Frédéric Chau as Sophie's boyfriend
- Franck Gastambide, Medi Sadoun & Jib Pocthier as The 3 Swiss

== Around the film ==
Depétrini, Bedia's real-life wife at the time, wrote the film as a fictionalization of their own relationship.

The film won the Radio-Canada Audience Award at the 2011 Cinéfranco film festival.
