= Amis publics =

2016 French comedy film

- Theatrical release poster
- Directed by: Edouard Pluvieux
- Written by: Kev Adams; Grégory Boutboul; John Eledjam; Edouard Pluvieux
- Produced by: Elisa Soussan; David-Christophe Barrot; Nathalie Cohen Smadja
- Starring: Kev Adams
- Cinematography: Guillaume Schiffman
- Edited by: Nicolas Grendena; Antoine Vareille
- Music by: Cascadeur
- Production company: My Family
- Distributed by: La Belle Company
- Release date: 17 February 2016
- Running time: 98 minutes
- Country: France
- Language: French
- Budget: $6 million
- Box office: $5.7 million

Amis publics is a 2016 French comedy film directed by Edouard Pluvieux and written by Pluvieux, Kev Adams, John Eledjam, and Grégory Boutboul.

== Synopsis ==
To make the dream of his young sick brother come true, Leo and his best friends, Franck and Lounès, organize a fake robbery. However, they hold up the wrong bank, where the fake robbery becomes real.

== Cast ==
- Kev Adams as Léo Perez
- Paul Bartel as Ben Perez
- Chloé Coulloud as Ana
- Vincent Elbaz as Bartoloméo
- John Eledjam as Franck
- Majid Berhila as Lounès
- Guy Lecluyse as Bruno
- Frank Bellocq as Eric
- Rebecca Azan as Stéphanie
- Malonn Lévana as Emilie
- Chems Tricot as Max
- Marc Wilhelm as Vincent
- Louise Chabat as Elise
- Nicolas Gabion as Jean-Louis
- Jina Djemba as Myriam
- Thérèse Roussel as Huguette
- Francine Lorin-Blazquez as Sylvie
- Anne Suarez as the commissioner
