= Double Zéro =

- Theatrical release poster
- Directed by: Gérard Pirès
- Written by: Alexandre Coquelle; Matthieu Le Naour
- Produced by: Thomas Langmann; Éric Judor; Ramzy Bedia
- Starring: Éric Judor; Ramzy Bedia; Édouard Baer; Georgianna Robertson; François Chattot
- Cinematography: Denis Rouden
- Edited by: Véronique Lange
- Music by: Colin Towns; D.J. Maze
- Production companies: La Petite Reine; 4 Mecs en Baskets Production; 4 Mecs à Lunettes Production; M6 Films; Alma Gate Limited; TPS Star
- Distributed by: Warner Bros. Pictures
- Release date: 16 June 2004
- Running time: 90 minutes
- Country: France
- Language: French
- Box office: $12.8 million

Double Zéro, also known as French Spies, is a 2004 French spy film directed by Gérard Pirès.

== Cast ==
- Éric Judor as Benoît Rivière
- Ramzy Bedia as William Le Sauvage
- Édouard Baer as le Mâle
- Georgianna Robertson as Natty Dreads
- François Chattot as Bob d'Auckland
