= Alad'2 =

Film directed by Lionel Steketee

- Theatrical release poster
- Directed by: Lionel Steketee
- Written by: Daive Cohen
- Produced by: Jonathan Blumental; Frantz Richard; Ardavan Safaee; Jérôme Seydoux; Daniel Tordjman
- Starring: Kev Adams; Jamel Debbouze; Vanessa Guide; Éric Judor; Ramzy Bedia
- Cinematography: Stéphane Le Parc
- Edited by: Frédérique Olszak
- Music by: Maxime Desprez; Michaël Tordjman
- Production companies: 74 Films; Pathé; M6 Films
- Distributed by: Pathé
- Release dates: 3 November 2018 (France); 11 January 2019 (Québec)
- Running time: 98 minutes
- Country: France
- Language: French
- Budget: €17 million
- Box office: $19 million

Alad'2, also known as The Brand New Adventures of Aladin, is a 2018 French comedy film directed by Lionel Steketee and produced by 74 Films, Pathé, and M6 Films. It stars Kev Adams, Jamel Debbouze, Vanessa Guide, Éric Judor, and Ramzy Bedia. It is a sequel to the 2015 film The New Adventures of Aladdin.

== Plot ==
Prince Aladdin (Kev Adams) is bored at the palace. His old life as an adventurer is missing and he does not feel legitimate in his luxurious clothes of a monarch. Shah Zaman (Jamel Debbouze), a ruthless dictator who decided to marry Princess Shallia (Vanessa Guide), seizes Baghdad and the palace. Aladdin is forced to flee and recover his former genie. This is his only chance to save his princess and Baghdad. Taking advantage of his rival's absence, Shah Zaman will try everything to win the princess's affection; from intimidation to seduction. After a long journey full of pitfalls (including a trip to America, Africa and an ice palace), Aladdin is finally back in Baghdad where he will have to face armed guards, the men of Richelieu, an evil genie in the pay of Shah Zaman, and Shah Zaman himself. He will above all have to fight an obstacle that he did not expect: the doubts of the princess.

== Cast ==
- Kev Adams as Aladdin / Sam
- Jamel Debbouze as Shah Zaman / Yanis
- Ramzy Bedia as Balouad, Shah Zaman's genie
- Vanessa Guide as Princess Shallia / Sofia
- Éric Judor as the Genie
- Noémie Lenoir as a transformation of Shah Zaman's Genie / waitress / flight attendant
- Nader Boussandel as the guard of the princess
- Wahid Bouzidi as Wahid
- Michaël Cohen as the shrink
- Booder as Aladdin turned into a soldier of Shah Zaman
- Dimitri Tordjman as the boy on the plane
- David Salles as head genie
- Jean-Paul Rouve as the vizier (cameo)
- Isabelle Nanty as the telephone operator (cameo)
- Frédéric Lopez as himself (cameo)
- Gérard Depardieu as Christopher Columbus (cameo)
- Florian Ordonez as a black market merchant (cameo)
- Olivio Ordonez as a black market merchant (cameo)
- Anaïs Delva as Elsa (cameo)
- Tal as herself (cameo)
