= Ratz (TV series) =

French-Canadian animated comedy adventure television series

- Genre: Comedy; Adventure
- Created by: Richard Zielenkiewicz (Note: credited as Monsieur Z)
- Directed by: François Reczulski
- Starring: French: Éric Judor; Ramzy Bédia; Emmanuel Garijo; Sylvia Bergé; Gérald Rinaldi; English: Terrence Scammell; Rick Jones; Tony Robinow; Sonja Ball; Arthur Holden
- Composer: Hervé Lavandier
- Countries of origin: France; Canada
- Original languages: French; English
- No. of episodes: 52

Production
- Executive producer: Marc du Pontavice
- Producer: Marc du Pontavice
- Running time: 22 minutes (11 minutes per segment)
- Production companies: Tooncan Productions, Inc.; Xilam

Original release
- Network: Teletoon (Canada); France 3 and Canal J (France)
- Release: September 21, 2003 – January 17, 2004

Ratz is a French-Canadian animated comedy adventure television series created by Richard Zielenkiewicz. The show stars two rats, Rapido and Razmo, aboard the S.S. Wanderer, a cheese-filled ship without an actual destination. The focus of the series is on the adventures of the two rats, including guarding the cheese, interacting with other stowaways and various ill-fated encounters with the crew. The rats themselves live in the hull of the ship in a lavish two-bedroom apartment.

The French version features the voices of the comedy duo Éric et Ramzy, while the English version features the voices of Terrence Scammell as Rapido and Rick Jones as Razmo.

The show premiered its first episode, "Cheese Connection" on March 7, 2003, on Teletoon, and the series finale episode, "Tomo the Sumo" aired on October 27, 2003. It can be streamed online since March 25, 2020 on Netflix, released in French first.

Ratz was originally one of the several projects Jean-Yves Raimbaud had, which was originally called Rat's. The series is the culmination of a project initiated by Jingle, directed by Raimbaud, in collaboration with the cartoonist Ptiluc. The initial project could not be completed due to the bankruptcy of the studio.

It was later titled Rapido (in an unaired pilot) and featured a chunkier animation style. Also of interest is the pure blend of traditional animation and 3D animation, and the eclectic soundtrack by Hervé Lavandier.

== Plot ==
Ratz mainly focuses on a duo of the eponymous rats, Rapido and Razmo, whose contrasting personalities often have them butt heads with each other. The only thing they both share is their love of cheese and live on board the S.S. Wanderer for that very reason. As they have occasional encounters with the ship's crewmates, or even get involved, the duo have all sorts of wacky misadventures. Some of the episodes also involve the rats having to deal with new one-shot characters.

== Characters ==
The series' titular duo are composed of two pitch-black rats, Rapido and Razmo, wearing helmets (with goggles attached) and outfits akin to a modern-day pilot (in red and blue, respectively), with elongated ears, lavender eyemask patterns and long snouts. Razmo is erroneously called "Ratz" on the blurb for the show in Sky program guides.

- Rapido is a jet set-wannabe with a huge ego to maintain. To get over his large self-doubts and low self-esteem, he acts condescendingly and often boasts having personal connections to various celebrities. Rapido is also a hypocrite, scolding Razmo sharply for engaging in an activity, then secretly pursuing the same later on. Rapido only has interest in himself and will not aide Razmo at all, unless the situation adversely affects himself. His interests include ratboard racing, celebrity magazines, fashion, house music, feeling important and wooing women. He is voiced by Terence Scammell, but was voiced by Ron Pardo in the pilot.
- Razmo is the shorter and stouter rat. He is a highly productive genius and mechanic, having invented the ratboard and being responsible for all mechanical and electrical issues. He is also forced to perform all chores as Rapido never lends a hand. This has led Razmo to become depressed, emotionally scarred and obsessive-compulsive. Razmo is also childish, sometimes speaking to a plush toy. His interests include playing stringed bass, jazz, counting the cheese, inventing and making friends. In the original Rapido short, Razmo had a Deep South accent; his voice was changed to have a slight Brooklyn accent. He is voiced by Rick Jones, but in the pilot, he was voiced by Scott McCord.

The rats themselves also have a means of transport (animated using cel-shaded 3D). An integral part of Ratz is the ratboard, a device resembling a mousetrap with a jet engine strapped to the back. The ratboard provides the rats with speedy travel in and around the ship. Rapido is very fond of his ratboard and enjoys challenging Razmo to races, often winning. Ratboards are also used to reach otherwise inaccessible places, provide speedy rescues, move things by tether or simply to impress guests. In spite of the ratboard's peculiar design choice, the rats humorously enough do not recognize an actual mousetrap, as seen in the episode "The Rat Exterminator". It is also seen in another episode that other rats can also ride on their own ratboards.

The crew of the S.S. Wanderer consists of three personnel: Benny the chef, Svetlana the engineer and The Captain. They aren't intended as the villains of the show, though, Benny is the one most enraged by the rats. The crew will usually return to their normal duties after brushing shoulders with Rapido and/or Razmo. Humorously enough, the crew's diet consists mostly of cheese (their cargo), which Svetlana hates and Benny is allergic to (although said allergies are not seen or discussed within the show).

- The Captain is a Scottish seaman and veteran of the seas. He is the only person who knows the final destination of the cheese in the cargo hold. Over the years, he has gone from a rather serious captain to a rather goofy one, often falling into reverie or suggesting absurd courses of action during crises. All of his orders are directed towards the other two crew members. He is voiced by Tony Robinow.
- Svetlana, the Russian engineer. She is responsible for keeping the S.S. Wanderer afloat and is usually found in situations requiring her massive size and strength. Despite her role on the ship, Svetlana attempts to act feminine whenever possible, which isn't very often. She is often talking to or conspiring with Benny. She is voiced by Sonja Ball.
- Benny, the Japanese chef. Benny is the only one that will give chase to the rats. Despite having five years of culinary arts under his belt, Benny is usually preparing soufflés or sushi for the rest of the crew. He is usually interrupted by Rapido and Razmo when he brings aboard a live animal to be slaughtered. He is voiced by Arthur Holden.

== Episodes ==
No.	Title	Written by	Storyboarded by	Original release date	Prod. code
1	"Cheese Connection"	François Boisivon	François Reczulski	September 21, 2003	101
Benny and Svetlana make a deal with the local mafia: cheese for money. Razmo realizes the disappearance of part of the cheese and discovers the plot that is brewing. Rapido remains indifferent to the problem, thinking that Razmo is completely paranoid, but Razmo is right, sadly...
2	"Rolling!" "Ça Tourne !"	Jean-Louis Momus and Vincent Paronnaud	François Reczulski	September 22, 2003	102
Rapido, wanting to implement his "talents" as an actor, gives Razmo a camera for his "birthday". Disappointed at first, Razmo starts becoming a tyrannical upsetting dictator... er, director.
3	"Screws Loose" "Le Boulon Manquant"	Antoine Le Bos and Eric Lodde	François Reczulski	September 23, 2003	103
TBA
4	"Hi Chick!" "Salut Ma Poule !"	Jean-Louis Momus and Vincent Paronnaud	François Reczulski	September 24, 2003	104
It's finally spring, but Razmo feels depressed. After Rapido tries to cheer him up, the rats see a chicken about to be cooked by Benny. Razmo's not going to let this happen!
5	"Out of Gas" "Panne Sèche"	François Le Verge	Charles Vaucelle	September 25, 2003	105
TBA
6	"Cheese Overboard" "Rat de Marée"	Juan Carlos Medina	François Reczulski	October 22, 2003	106
TBA
7	"Loop Da Loop" "Rapido Contre Looping"	Stéphane Melchior and François Reczulski	Charles Vaucelle	October 24, 2003	107
TBA
8	"The Night of the Toxic Goudas" "La Nuit du Gouda Toxique"	Jean-Louis Momus and Vincent Paronnaud	François Reczulski	October 29, 2003	108
It's Halloween and the ship has bought some toxic waste. It spills on Razmo's gouda cheese jack o'lanterns, and they cause mayhem. According to Razmo, "they're alive, angry, and vicious!"
9	"The Thief Who Came in from the Cold" "Un Ami Qui Vous Vent du Bien"	Françis Magnenot	Charles Vaucelle	November 17, 2003	109
TBA
10	"Eat as You Can" "Fromage à Gogo"	Hadrien Soulez Lariviere	Luc Vinciguerra	November 28, 2003	110
The crew has installed a new engine. Rapido and Razmo are satisfied with it until they find out that the cheese is the power source!
11	"So-Called Christmas Spirit" "Vendetta de Noël"	Jean-Louis Momus and Vincent Paronnaud	François Reczulski	December 23, 2003	111
TBA
12	"The Little Orphan" "Le Petit Orphelin"	Alex Donaro	François Reczulski	January 17, 2004	112
TBA
13	"The Curse of Rachamac" "La Malédiction de Rachamac"	Grégory Jarry	Sandra Derval	October 1, 2003	113
TBA
14	"Ragamuffin" "Monsieur Crapoli"	Nicolas Gallet	Charles Vaucelle	October 5, 2003	114
TBA
15	"Pearls Before Ratz" "Une Perle Rare"	Jean-Louis Momus and Vincent Paronnaud	Luc Vinciguerra	October 7, 2003	115
TBA
16	"Three to Tango" "Sérénade à Trois"	Pierre Olivier	François Reczulski	October 15, 2003	116
TBA
17	"Cheese Dreams" "Un Cauchemar de Fromage"	Nicolas Gallet	Charles Vaucelle	October 3, 2003	117
After having another nightmare about a giant monster cheese, Razmo decides to make an invention to know why he has these nightmares. When it's hooked up to a piece of cheese, the cheese is seemingly alive! Razmo now protects the cheese with care, but Rapido won't have any of it.
18	"Stop"	Hadrien Soulez Lariviere	Luc Vinciguerra	September 21, 2003	118
After a terrible Rat-board accident, Razmo decides to set up signs and new modifications on the Rat-boards to limit risky driving. Rapido detests this, however.
19	"The Genie" "Le Genie du Fromage"	Hadrien Soulez Lariviere	Charles Vaucelle	September 24, 2003	119
Rapido discovers a genie who offers them to fulfill three wishes. Razmo wants to be a magnet for cheese and Rapido wants everything he touches to be turned into cheese. Alas, their newfound powers will transform their day into a nightmare.
20	"Treasure Hunt" "Chasse au Trésor"	Pierre Olivier	François Reczulski	September 28, 2003	120
TBA
21	"The Godfathers" "Les Parrains"	Patricia De Figveiredo	Luc Vinciguerra	October 6, 2003	121
TBA
22	"The Year of the Rat" "L'Année du Rat"	Jean-Louis Momus	Charles Vaucelle	November 8, 2003	122
TBA
23	"The Hitchhiker" "Le Cargo Stoppeur"	Nicolas Gallet	François Reczulski	September 27, 2003	123
TBA
24	"Love Thy Neighbors" "Chacun Chez Soi"	Pierre Olivier	Luc Vinciguerra	October 10, 2003	124
TBA
25	"Bio Hazard" "Ecolo Mais Pas Trop"	Nicolas Gallet	Charles Vaucelle	October 8, 2003	125
TBA
26	"QueenfFor a Day" "La Reine des Tommes"	Thomas Szabo	Charles Vaucelle	October 9, 2003	126
TBA
27	"The Rat Exterminator" "Le Dératiseur"	Stéphane Melchior and François Reczulski	François Reczulski	October 17, 2003	127
TBA
28	"The Mermaids' Siren" "Le Chant Des Sirènes"	Loo Hui Phang and Françis Magnenot	François Reczulski	November 9, 2003	128
TBA
29	"Rabbits Rampage" "Le Coup Du Lapin"	Evelyne Hoffman and Emmanuelle Boutet	Charles Vaucelle	October 26, 2003	129
TBA
30	"Panic Mouse" "Panique à Bord"	Alain Vallejo	Luc Vinciguerra	October 2, 2003	130
TBA
31	"Canned Tuna" "Thon Heure à Sonné !"	Thomas Szabo	François Reczulski	October 13, 2003	131
TBA
32	"Monkey Business" "Drôle d'Oiseau"	Thomas Szabo	Charles Vaucelle	October 25, 2003	132
TBA
33	"Benny's Special" "La Recette Provencale De Benny"	Renée Falson	Luc Vinciguerra	October 14, 2003	133
TBA
34	"2001, A Cheese Odyssey" "2001, l'Odyssée de l'Emmenthal"	Thomas Szabo	Thomas Szabo	October 18, 2003	134
TBA
35	"Raz, Prince of Darkness" "Raz, Prince des Ténébres"	Nicolas Gallet	François Reczulski	October 19, 2003	135
TBA
36	"The Ugly Wormling" "Le Ver est Dans la Tomme"	Thomas Szabo	Luc Vinciguerra	October 31, 2003	136
TBA
37	"Kung Fu Muenster" "Kung Fu Münster"	Thomas Szabo	Thomas Szabo	October 23, 2003	137
The freighter is moored in the port of Hong Kong. Razmo raves as he watches a kung fu movie on TV for the tenth time. In order to regain Razmo's interest, Rapido teaches him that he has perfectly mastered Shaolin combat techniques, following his stay in Tibet.
38	"The Legend of Ratman" "La Légende de Ratman"	Pierre Olivier	Luc Vinciguerra	October 20, 2003	138
After a terrible blow the head, Razmo wakes up as the freighter drops anchor in the harbor of grim Ratham City. The local boss, a huge masked rat nicknamed "the Docker", has decided to appropriate the cargo of rats, and these two had better not stand in his way. Cowardly, Rapido swears he won't. Razmo, appalled and disgusted by such cowardice, decides to protect the cheese alone, but Ratman comes! Pretentious like Rapido, he tries to compete with Razmo.
39	"Stuck on You" "Indécrochable"	Jean-Louis Momus	François Reczulski	October 12, 2003	139
Benny gets a rat hunter sent by his cousin. He is a hedgehog adept at non-violence. His attempts to gently evict him only attract jeers from the two rats. At the end of his patience and arguments, the hedgehog ends up unleashing his secret weapon, a huge chip, on Rapido and Razmo...
40	"The Motivational Lobster" "Le Complexe de La Langouste"	Olivier Jean-Marie	Charles Vaucelle	October 24, 2003	140
TBA
41	"The Rat Who Would Be King" "Le Rat Qui Voulut Etre Roi"	Nicolas Gallet	Luc Vinciguerra	October 21, 2003	141
TBA
42	"Mackerel Brothers Blues" "Le Blues du Maquereau"	Olivier Jean-Marie	Luc Vinciguerra	October 22, 2003	142
TBA
43	"Sweet Freedom" "Liberté Chérie"	Pierre Olivier	Thomas Szabo	November 5, 2003	143
TBA
44	"Best Laid Plans of Ratz and Men" "Les Grandes Manoeuvres"	Jean-Louis Momus and Vincent Paronnaud	François Reczulski	November 10, 2003	144
TBA
45	"Friends for Life" "Amis pour la Vie"	Stéphane Piera	Luc Vinciguerra	October 28, 2003	145
TBA
46	"The Cheesball Champ" "Tacles et Raclettes"	Alain Vallejo	Fred Mintoff	October 29, 2003	146
TBA
47	"The Duel" "Le Duel"	Nicolas Gallet	François Reczulski	November 1, 2003	147
TBA
48	"Techno Armadillos" "Tatoo Tech"	Olivier Derynck	Luc Vinciguerra	October 20, 2003	148
TBA
49	"Catch a Falling Star" "SOS Météore"	Charles Vaucelle and François Reczulski	François Reczulski	November 2, 2003	149
TBA
50	"Razmo's Ark" "Le Cargo du Deluge"	Jean-Louis Momus	Luc Vinciguerra	November 4, 2003	150
TBA
51	"For Ernest" "Pour Ernest"	François Reczulski	François Reczulski	November 3, 2003	151
TBA
52	"Tomo the Sumo" "Tomo le Sumo"	Jean-Louis Momus and François Reczulski	François Reczulski	October 27, 2003	152
TBA

== Reception ==
The series has no notable reviews and thus holds no Metacritic score.

While being targeted at young children in France, the series has gained a small cult following of older ages in Canada, due to its late-night timeslot. The show is also notable for its positive portrayal of rats, unusual for Western and North American cultures, which often give its fictional rats selfish, antagonizing and evil characteristics. The show is also fondly remembered in France, where it aired on France 3 in 2003, Canal J in 2004, Boing in 2012 and Gulli in 2008.

== Merchandise ==
- Ratz has Region 2 DVD volumes out in France and Belgium, released by France Télévisions and Warner Home Video, containing eight episodes per DVD.
- A few albums, A fond les bananes ! and Pas de panique à bord, featuring Éric et Ramzy, has also been released in France. The show's theme song "Pas de panique à bord", the record's opening track, was a minor hit in France.
- In Fall 2004, Smoby Toys released the toy line based on the show such as velvet furred dolls, real working play sets and plushies just like the show of the same name. But as of 2006, Smoby has discontinued the show's toy line.
- Ratz had CGI-animated music videos that were released on the Sparx Animation Studios website, along with Teletoon, with eight songs based from the album of the same name.
