= Georgianna Robertson =

Jamaican-born model and actress (born 1972)

- Born: Georgianna Robertson; March 23, 1972 (age 54); Port Maria, Jamaica
- Modeling information
- Height: 1.80 m (5 ft 11 in)
- Hair color: Black
- Eye color: Brown
- Agency: FORD Models New York Celebrity Division

Georgianna Robertson (March 23, 1972, Port Maria, Jamaica) is a Jamaican-born model and actress. She has appeared on over covers of Spanish, French and Italian editions of Elle and Vogue Paris. Robertson walked numerous of fashion shows, including Jean Paul Gaultier, Yves Saint Laurent, Carolina Herrera, Ralph Lauren, and the 1997 Victoria's Secret Fashion Show.

== Trivia ==
- Robertson came to New York at age 12. She has one older brother, six younger brothers and three sisters.
- She was a muse of Yves Saint Laurent and one of his favourite models.
- She starred in Prêt-à-Porter, Save the Rabbit and Double Zéro. She was also featured in Ini Kamoze's "Here Comes the Hotstepper" and Stevie Wonder's "When Robbins Will Sing" music videos.
- She has her own swimwear line called GEORGIANNA ROBERTSON.
- On the first cycle of Scandinavia's Next Top Model, she performed a similar role to that of Tyra Banks in the original series of the show.
