= Serial Teachers 2 =

- Film poster
- Directed by: Pierre-François Martin-Laval
- Screenplay by: Pierre-François Martin-Laval; Mathias Gavarry
- Based on: Characters created by Pica and Erroc
- Produced by: Romain Rojtman
- Starring: Kev Adams; Isabelle Nanty; Didier Bourdon; Pierre-François Martin-Laval; Arnaud Ducret; Stéfi Celma; Raymond Bouchard; Fred Tousch; Gaia Weiss
- Cinematography: Régis Blondeau
- Edited by: Thibaut Damade; Claire Fieschi
- Music by: Matthieu Gonet
- Production companies: Les Films du Premier; TF1 Films Production; UGC
- Distributed by: UGC Distribution
- Release date: 1 July 2015
- Running time: 92 minutes
- Country: France
- Language: French
- Budget: $16 million
- Box office: $22.9 million

Serial Teachers 2 (French: The Profs 2 / Les Profs 2) is a 2015 French comedy film directed by Pierre-François Martin-Laval. It is the sequel to 2013's Serial Teachers (Les Profs).

== Cast ==
- Kev Adams as Thierry Boulard
- Isabelle Nanty as Gladys
- Didier Bourdon as Serge Cutiro / Tirocu
- Pierre-François Martin-Laval as Antoine Polochon
- Arnaud Ducret as Éric
- Stéfi Celma as Amina
- Gaia Weiss as Vivienne
- Firmine Richard as Madame Saint-Gilles
- Raymond Bouchard as Maurice
- Fred Tousch as Albert
- Laura Benson as Miss Johns
- Francis Chapman as Young Prince William
- Uday Singh II as best student
