= Once Upon a Time in the Oued =

- Theatrical release poster
- Directed by: Djamel Bensalah
- Written by: Djamel Bensalah; Gilles Laurent; Abdelkrim Brahmi; Yohan Duport; Mokobé
- Produced by: Franck Chorot
- Starring: Julien Courbey
- Cinematography: Pascal Gennesseaux
- Edited by: Jean-François Elie
- Production companies: Gaumont; Miroir Magique! France 2 Cinéma; Canal+ TPS Star
- Distributed by: Gaumont Columbia TriStar Films
- Release date: 19 October 2005
- Running time: 93 minutes
- Country: France
- Language: French
- Budget: $5 million
- Box office: $5.6 million

Once Upon a Time in the Oued (or Il était une fois dans l'oued) is a 2005 French comedy film directed by Djamel Bensalah.

== Plot ==
Johnny Leclerc, from a Norman mother and an Alsatian father lives in a company in suburban city of his friends, mostly North Africans. He behaves like a Muslim, make the Ramadan and wear a djellaba. He is even persuaded to be called Abdul Bashir and to be born in a small village of Bled. When his friend Yacine has some trouble with a local guy and decides to return for holidays in Algeria, he sailed clandestinely in the luggage of the Sabri family to fulfill his dream and finally know his "roots". Just arrived on the Algerian coast, Johnny feels like home.

== Cast ==
- Julien Courbey as Johnny Leclerc / Abdel Bachir
- Sid Ahmed Agoumi as Monsieur Sabri
- David Saracino as Yacine
- Marilou Berry as Nadège
- Karina Testa as Nadia
- Amina Annabi as Madame Khiera Sabri
- Medy Kerouani as Medy
- Karim Belkhadra as The Godfather
- Frankie Pain as Johnny's mother
- Max Morel as Johnny's father
- Mohamed Kafi as The Uncle
- Souhila Yagoubi as Aunt Alima
- Élie Semoun as The butler
- Ramzy Bedia & Éric Judor as The costume seller
- Olivier Baroux as The Swiss
