= Serial Teachers =

- Film poster
- Directed by: Pierre-François Martin-Laval
- Screenplay by: Pierre-François Martin-Laval; Mathias Gavarry
- Based on: Les Profs by Pica and Erroc
- Produced by: Romain Rojtman
- Starring: Christian Clavier; Isabelle Nanty; Pierre-François Martin-Laval; Kev Adams
- Cinematography: Régis Blondeau
- Edited by: Thibaut Damade
- Music by: Matthieu Gonet
- Production companies: Les Films du 24; TF1 Films Production
- Distributed by: UGC Distribution
- Release date: 17 April 2013
- Running time: 88 minutes
- Country: France
- Language: French
- Budget: $11.8 million
- Box office: $32.5 million

Serial Teachers (French title: Les Profs) is a 2013 French comedy film directed by Pierre-François Martin-Laval. The film is based on the comics Les Profs by Pica and Erroc. It was the top-grossing French film of the year, with a total of 3,957,176 admissions in France. A sequel, Serial Teachers 2, was released on 1 July 2015.

== Cast ==
- Christian Clavier as Serge Cutiro
- Isabelle Nanty as Gladys
- Pierre-François Martin-Laval as Antoine Polochon
- Kev Adams as Thierry Boulard
- Arnaud Ducret as Éric
- Stéfi Celma as Amina
- Raymond Bouchard as Maurice
- Fred Tousch as Albert
- Alice David as Marie
- François Morel as the academy deputy inspector
- Dominique Pinon as the academy inspector
- Philippe Duclos as the headmaster
- Éric Naggar as Paul
- Yves Pignot as Monsieur Miranda
- Marie-Laure Descoureaux as Dolorès
- Nicolas Beaucaire as Monsieur Blondeau
- Jean-Louis Barcelona as Marcellin Jacquard
- Fabienne Chaudat as The academy secretary
- Claire Chazal as a television journalist
