= Cravate club =

- DVD cover
- Directed by: Frédéric Jardin
- Written by: Jérôme Dassier; Frédéric Jardin
- Based on: Cravate club by Fabrice Roger-Lacan
- Produced by: Françoise Galfré
- Starring: Charles Berling; Édouard Baer
- Cinematography: Laurent Machuel
- Edited by: Marco Cavé
- Music by: Nicolas Errèra
- Production company: Alicéleo
- Distributed by: Rézo Films
- Release date: July 3, 2002 (France)
- Running time: 85 minutes
- Country: France
- Language: French
- Budget: $4.8 million
- Box office: $1.2 million

Cravate club is a 2002 French comedy film about two architects sharing an office. The film features a scene where the characters perform a choreographed sequence using their office chairs.
