= Prêt-à-Porter (film) =

1994 film by Robert Altman

- US theatrical promotional poster
- Directed by: Robert Altman
- Written by: Robert Altman; Barbara Shulgasser
- Produced by: Robert Altman
- Starring: Anouk Aimée; Marcello Mastroianni; Sophia Loren; Kim Basinger; Stephen Rea; Lauren Bacall; Julia Roberts; Tim Robbins; Lili Taylor; Sally Kellerman; Tracey Ullman; Linda Hunt; Rupert Everett; Forest Whitaker; Richard E. Grant; Danny Aiello; Teri Garr; Lyle Lovett; Jean Rochefort; Michel Blanc; Jean-Pierre Cassel; Ute Lemper; Anne Canovas; François Cluzet; Tatjana Patitz
- Cinematography: Pierre Mignot; Jean Lépine
- Edited by: Geraldine Peroni; Suzy Elmiger
- Music by: Michel Legrand
- Distributed by: Miramax Films
- Release dates: December 12, 1994 (New York City); December 25, 1994 (United States)
- Running time: 133 minutes
- Country: United States
- Languages: English; French; Italian; Russian; Spanish
- Budget: $18 million (estimated)
- Box office: $46.8 million

Prêt-à-Porter, released in the United States as Ready to Wear (Prêt-à-Porter), is a 1994 American satirical comedy-drama film co-written, directed, and produced by Robert Altman and shot on location during the Paris Fashion Week with a host of international stars, models, and designers.

The film features an extensive ensemble cast, including Anouk Aimée, Marcello Mastroianni, Sophia Loren, Kim Basinger, Stephen Rea, Lauren Bacall, Julia Roberts, Tim Robbins, Lili Taylor and Sally Kellerman.

== Plot ==
Models, designers, industry hot shots and journalists gather for Paris Fashion Week, to work, bicker and try to seduce each other. Early on, Fashion Council head Olivier de la Fontaine chokes to death on a sandwich, leaving behind a wife, a mistress and a mysterious Russian companion who has fled the scene.

As the death is being investigated, Fashion Week continues. Injecting herself between the designers, American television personality Kitty gets sound bites from the high-fashion types throughout the length of the show.

Meanwhile, Anne and Joe are two American journalists, thrown together into the same over-booked room. They are meant to cover the show for their respective papers, but skip out on most of the festivities to have a hotel-room tryst during the week.

Three rival magazine editors from Harper's Bazaar, British Vogue and Elle vie for the exclusive services of Milo O'Brannigan, a trendy photographer who sexually humiliates the three; leading them to vow vengeance against him.

Sergei, a fading icon (and the mysterious Russian with Olivier when he died) and Isabella (Olivier's widow) hope to rekindle a romance from decades ago, but as they attempt to be intimate, Sergei falls asleep.

In the end, Fontaine's former mistress Simone sends her models down the catwalk nude in protest of her son Jack's (who incidentally had been cheating on his model wife with her sister) sale of her brand. Kitty quits on the spot, as the nudity confuses her. The final scene is of Olivier de la Fontaine's funeral procession, after the police declared him dead from choking on a sandwich.

== Cast ==
- Marcello Mastroianni as Sergei/Sergio
- Sophia Loren as Isabella de la Fontaine
- Jean-Pierre Cassel as Olivier de la Fontaine
- Kim Basinger as Kitty Potter
- Chiara Mastroianni as Sophie Choiset
- Stephen Rea as Milo O'Brannigan
- Anouk Aimée as Simone Lowenthal
- Rupert Everett as Jack Lowenthal
- Rossy de Palma as Pilar
- Georgianna Robertson as Dane Simpson
- Lili Taylor as Fiona Ulrich
- Ute Lemper as Albertine
- Forest Whitaker as Cy Bianco
- Richard E. Grant as Cort Romney
- Julia Roberts as Anne Eisenhower
- Tim Robbins as Joe Flynn
- Lauren Bacall as Slim Chrysler
- Lyle Lovett as Clint Lammeraux
- Tracey Ullman as Nina Scant
- Sally Kellerman as Sissy Wanamaker
- Linda Hunt as Regina Krumm
- Teri Garr as Louise Hamilton
- Danny Aiello as Major Hamilton
- Jean Rochefort as Inspector Tantpis
- Michel Blanc as Inspector Forget
- François Cluzet as Nina's assistant
- Kasia Figura as Sissy's assistant
- Sam Robards as Regina's assistant
- Alexandra Vandernoot as Sandra de la Notte
- Laura Benson as Milo's close friend

The film includes various cameo appearances from fashion industry figures, including designers Jean-Paul Gaultier and Björk modeling for him, Thierry Mugler, Sonia Rykiel, Christian LaCroix, Gianfranco Ferré, and Issey Miyake, and models such as Christy Turlington, Helena Christensen, Adriana Karembeu, Linda Evangelista, Claudia Schiffer, Carla Bruni, Naomi Campbell and Tatjana Patitz. Cher and Harry Belafonte also make cameos.

== Production ==
Robert Altman was inspired to make the film after accompanying his wife Kathryn to a Sonia Rykiel fashion show in Paris in 1984. "I couldn't believe what I saw. It was such a circus. It was just too theatrical not to want to film," Altman said in a 1994 interview. For research, in the fall of 1993 Altman attended several fashion shows including those of Issey Miyake, Yohji Yamamoto, Jean-Paul Gaultier and Yves Saint Laurent.

The film originally had a budget of $12 to $14 million, however, the final cost was estimated at between $18 to $20 million.

It was shot at the 1994 Spring/Summer season of Paris Fashion Week. In reference to the scene in which Simone's models walk down the runway completely naked, Robert Altman said: "The actors knew, but most of the audience didn't, so I got the surprise reactions I was hoping for. Those women were wonderful. However, I think that without Ute Lemper, the pregnant bride at the end of the show, the scene wouldn't have had that same impact. And without that scene the whole film probably wouldn't make as much sense."

== Release ==
In the United States, the film was released on December 25, 1994 under the title Ready to Wear (Prêt-à-Porter), while the original title was used in other countries. The US DVD and VHS title was Robert Altman's Ready to Wear.

The film was R-rated by the Motion Picture Association of America (MPAA). However, following an advertisement by Columbia Records for the soundtrack album featuring a naked Helena Christensen in The New York Times which also said "See the Movie", the MPAA threatened to rescind its rating unless the company agreed not to use the image advertising the film.

For the film's German release, a line referring to German designer Karl Lagerfeld as a "plagiarist" was removed. Though Lagerfeld had filed a court injunction against the film's release in his home country, the film's German distributor, Senator Film, agreed to cut the reference and the release went ahead as planned.

=== Box office ===
The film had a weak debut at the US box office. By the end of its run, the film grossed U$11,300,653 at the box office in the United States and Canada. It grossed $35.5 million internationally for a worldwide total of $46.8 million.

=== Critical reception ===
Prêt-à-Porter holds a 24% approval rating on Rotten Tomatoes based on 25 reviews, with an average rating of 4.75/10.

Roger Ebert gave the film two-and-a-half stars out of four and thought it "should have gone further and been meaner; too many of [Altman's] jokes are generic slapstick, instead of being aimed squarely at industry's targets." Gene Siskel gave it one-and-a-half out of four stars and called it "a true bomb as director Robert Altman, on a very hot streak, improbably finds absolutely nothing funny or fresh to say about the fashion industry and the 'journalists' who cover it with a wet kiss. Lacking a screenplay, Altman's intercutting among boring caricatures grows old quickly, and after 2 1/2 hours, it may occur to you: 'I could have been shopping.'" Janet Maslin of The New York Times wrote that Altman's "laissez-faire satirical style proves ineffectual for shooting fish in this barrel. Fashion is too self-conscious to be skewered so casually". Rita Kempley of The Washington Post called the film "a mess" that was "most compelling when Altman turns his camera on the kitschy runway shows themselves ... Perhaps Altman should have made this film as a documentary instead". Kenneth Turan of the Los Angeles Times wrote that the film "sounds like Altman's most recent successes, The Player and Short Cuts. But there is a difference between creative improvisation and absolute chaos, and while those films were delicately balanced balls that magically stayed in the air, Ready to Wear, with a script credited to Altman and Barbara Shulgasser, has a haphazard 'Let's go to Paris and see what happens' feeling that wastes everyone's time and talent." Owen Gleiberman of Entertainment Weekly gave the film a grade of C− and wrote: "Virtually everything that happens is held up for our ridicule, yet it's never quite clear what we're supposed to be laughing at. The characters aren't really mocked for their attitudes, their obsessions with glamour and money and style. They aren't savaged in any specific, observational ways that could truly be called satirical. They're made fun of simply because they're silly, trivial human beings—walking punchlines in a joke that never arrives. It's like watching an Altman film that's been drained by a vampire."

John Simon of the National Review said Prêt-à-Porter was a picture that only a director's mother could love, and that the film, which has a runtime of over two hours, wears out its welcome in ten minutes.

The response from the fashion community was similarly tepid. In a review that was published in December 1994, fashion critic Suzy Menkes wrote: "For fashion folks, the film just didn't come off—either as an extended skit, or as a bitchy or brutal dissection of the industry ... Most people did not think that Altman had done for fashion with Ready to Wear what he did to the United States Army in M*A*S*H or for Hollywood in The Player."

=== Year-end lists ===
- 8th worst – Janet Maslin, The New York Times
- Dishonorable mention – William Arnold, Seattle Post-Intelligencer

=== Accolades ===
Award	Category	Subject	Result
Golden Globe Awards	Best Motion Picture – Musical or Comedy	Prêt-à-Porter	Nominated
Golden Globe Awards	Best Supporting Actress	Sophia Loren	Nominated
National Board of Review Awards	Best Acting by an Ensemble	Marcello Mastroianni, Sophia Loren, Jean-Pierre Cassel, Kim Basinger, Chiara Mastroianni, Stephen Rea, Anouk Aimée, Rupert Everett, Rossy de Palma, Tara Leon, Georgianna Robertson, Lili Taylor, Ute Lemper, Forest Whitaker, Tom Novembre, Richard E. Grant, Anne Canovas, Julia Roberts, Tim Robbins, Lauren Bacall, Lyle Lovett, Tracey Ullman, Sally Kellerman, Linda Hunt, Teri Garr, Danny Aiello, Jean Rochefort, Michel Blanc	Won

== Soundtrack ==
Professional ratings
Review scores
Source	Rating
AllMusic	4.5/5 stars
Smash Hits	4/5 stars

=== Track listing ===
1. "Here Comes the Hotstepper" (Heartical Mix) – Ini Kamoze
2. "My Girl Josephine" – Super Cat
3. "Here We Come" – Salt-N-Pepa
4. "Natural Thing" – M People
5. "70's Love Groove" – Janet Jackson
6. "Jump on Top of Me" – The Rolling Stones
7. "These Boots Are Made for Walkin'" – Sam Phillips
8. "Pretty" (Remix) – The Cranberries
9. "Third Time Lucky" – Basia
10. "Martha" – Eric Mouquet, Michel Sanchez forming the group Deep Forest
11. "Close to You" – The Brand New Heavies
12. "Keep Givin' Me Your Love" (West End Mix) – Cece Peniston
13. "Get Wild" – The New Power Generation
14. "Supermodel Sandwich" – Terence Trent D'Arby
15. "Lemon" (Perfecto Mix) – U2

=== Chart performance ===
Chart (1995)	Peak position
Australian Albums (ARIA)	12
Austrian Albums (Ö3 Austria)	32
Belgian Albums (Ultratop Flanders)	25
Belgian Albums (Ultratop Wallonia)	22
Canada Top Albums/CDs (RPM)	36
New Zealand Albums (RMNZ)	23
US Billboard 200	29

== Television adaptation ==
In August 2021, a television series adaptation of the film was reported to be in development at Paramount+, with Miramax Television being mentioned as the producer. In October 2023, development on the series shifted to the BBC, with Paramount+ no longer involved.
