= Les Dalton (film) =

2004 Western comedy film

- Theatrical release poster
- Directed by: Philippe Haïm
- Written by: Éric Judor; Ramzy Bedia; Michel Hazanavicius; Philippe Haim
- Produced by: Saïd Ben Saïd; Yves Marmion
- Starring: Eric Judor; Ramzy Bedia
- Cinematography: David Carretero
- Edited by: Richard Marizy
- Music by: Alexandre Azaria
- Production companies: UGC Images, France; Integral Film, Germany; Castelao Producciones, Spain; TF1 Films Production, France
- Distributed by: UGC Fox Distribution
- Release date: 8 December 2004
- Running time: 86 minutes
- Countries: France; Germany; Spain
- Languages: French; German; Spanish
- Budget: €26.1 million
- Box office: $15 million

Les Dalton is a 2004 Western comedy film directed by Philippe Haïm. It was inspired by the characters The Daltons in the comic Lucky Luke. It was filmed in France, Germany, and Spain. It was released 8 December 2004. The comic had previously inspired several films, in particular La Ballade des Dalton (1978). The film's budget of €26.1 million makes it one of the most expensive non-English language films. The film was presented at the 7th Almería Western Film Festival on October 11, 2017.

== Plot ==
Joe and Averell are respectively the oldest and youngest of the four Dalton brothers, the most dangerous bandits in the history of the Far West, and their failures are of such calibre that their own mother is turning against them.

But they react when Mama Dalton kicks them out of their own home and they decide to make her proud of them by robbing the Gulch City Bank, where security is so high that even employees are trained in martial arts. They fail in the robbery of the bank and Joe and Averell, along with their brothers, are imprisoned.

In the cell, they meet a Mexican who reveals information about a magic hat that makes him invincible. Joe immediately decides to get the hat, so the four brothers run away from prison and head for Mexico, leaving chaos in their wake. Arguing non-stop, Joe and Averell compete for power in a small town and manage to infiltrate a gang of criminals, where, after a spectacular battle, they steal the magic hat from the bandit who had it. But the problems are only beginning because of the constant and growing rivalry between Joe and Averell and the fact that the law is on their heels. Again in Gulch City, the brothers will try to rob the bank again and get their mother to be proud of them.

== Cast ==
- Éric Judor: Joe Dalton
- Ramzy Bedia: Averell Dalton
- Saïd Serrari: Jack Dalton
- Romain Berger: William Dalton
- Til Schweiger: Lucky Luke
- Marthe Villalonga: Ma Dalton
- Javivi: El Tarlo
- Sylvie Joly: Ma Billy
- Ginette Garcin: Ma James
- Marie-Pierre Casey: Ma Cassidy
- Élie Semoun: Doxey
- Michel Muller: Bank director
- Jean Benguigui: Mexican village chief
- Kad Merad: Mexican prisoner
- Jean Dujardin: Cowboy
- Darry Cowl: Old Timer

== See also ==
- Lucky Luke
