= Never on the First Night =

- Theatrical poster
- Directed by: Melissa Drigeard
- Written by: Melissa Drigeard; Vincent Juillet
- Produced by: Dominique Farrugia; Dominique Brunner
- Starring: Alexandra Lamy; Mélanie Doutey; Julie Ferrier
- Cinematography: Laurent Dailland
- Edited by: Sylvie Gadmer
- Distributed by: EuropaCorp
- Release date: 1 January 2014
- Running time: 91 minutes
- Country: France
- Language: French
- Budget: $7.4 million
- Box office: $7.3 million

Never on the First Night (French: Jamais le premier soir) is a 2014 French comedy film, directed by Melissa Drigeard.

== Cast ==
- Alexandra Lamy as Julie
- Mélanie Doutey as Louise
- Julie Ferrier as Rose
- Jean-Paul Rouve as Marc
- Grégory Fitoussi as Ange
- Julien Boisselier as Charles
- Arnaud Henriet as Gilles
- Michel Vuillermoz as Viktor Bells
- Olivia Côte as TV Host
- Ophélia Kolb as The hostess
