= Hold-Up (miniseries) =

- Also known as: Hold-Up
- Genre: Action; Drama; Suspense
- Created by: Alexandre Pidoux
- Directed by: Alexandre Pidoux
- Starring: Slimane Yefsah; Arnaud Ducret; Mathieu Lourdel; Yaniss Lespert; Lionnel Astier
- Music by: Gilles Lakoste
- Country of origin: France
- Original language: French
- No. of seasons: 1
- No. of episodes: 3

Production
- Running time: 50 minutes

Original release
- Network: Eurochannel
- Release: 2011

L'Attaque (English: The Hold-Up) is a French suspense and drama miniseries created by Alexandre Pidoux and written by Sylvain Saada. It premiered in 2011 on Eurochannel and France 2. Consisting of three episodes, each lasting 50 minutes, the series deals with the robbery of a Parisian bank, exploring the clash of personalities between the protagonists during the hours of the heist.

== Plot ==
A group of young thieves attempt to carry out the biggest robbery in Francia's history, looting the private safe deposit boxes in a bank vault. Karim Allaoui, a young man whose occupation is not mentioned, is the leader of the gang. He is accompanied by three other thieves with different personalities: Alex Nony, a former legionnaire who uses his military knowledge to successfully carry out the robberies; Loustic, a sadistic robber with a long criminal record who enjoys humiliating his victims; and Mino, the youngest and most reserved of them, who suffers from diabetes.

== Cast ==
- Slimane Yefsah as Karim Allaoui, convicted thief and mastermind of the robbery
- Arnaud Ducret as Alex Nony, former soldier turned thief
- Mathieu Lourdel as Loustic, convicted thief
- Yaniss Lespert as Mino, the youngest of the thieves
- Lionnel Astier as Commissioner Bahktiar, head of the Police Prefecture
- François-Eric Gendron as Martin Luthard, restaurant owner
- Delphine Rollin as Pauline Varín, bank secretary
- Cyril Couton as Masson, the bank manager
- Élisabeth Commelin as Cristina Ferré, bank receptionist
- Julia Maraval as Alica Sampayo, dancer and bank hostage
- Blandine Bellavoir as Agnès Bailly, member of the Police Prefecture
- Cédric Weber as Officer Toussaint, member of the Police Prefecture
- Ivan Cori as Calix, thief and friend of the protagonists
- Ralph Amoussou as Mouss, thief and friend of the protagonists
- Antoine Laurent as Baroni, one of the bank hostages
- Nailia Harzoune as Naima, Karim's girlfriend
- Nicolas Guillot as Corti, bank secretary
- Adrien Ruiz as Samy, pizza delivery boy
- Sabine Cisse as Adiba, member of the Police Prefecture
- Nicolás Wanczycki as Gex, member of the Police Prefecture
- Françoise Pinkwasser as Luisa Carrar, Loustic's mother
- Maurice Antoni as Mr. Maurin, one of the bank hostages

== Episodes ==
No. overall	No. in season	Title	Original release date
1	1	"Paris s'éveille"	2011
2	2	"Votre argent m'intéresse"	2011
3	3	"Larmes sans sang"	2011
