= Cascadeur =

French musician

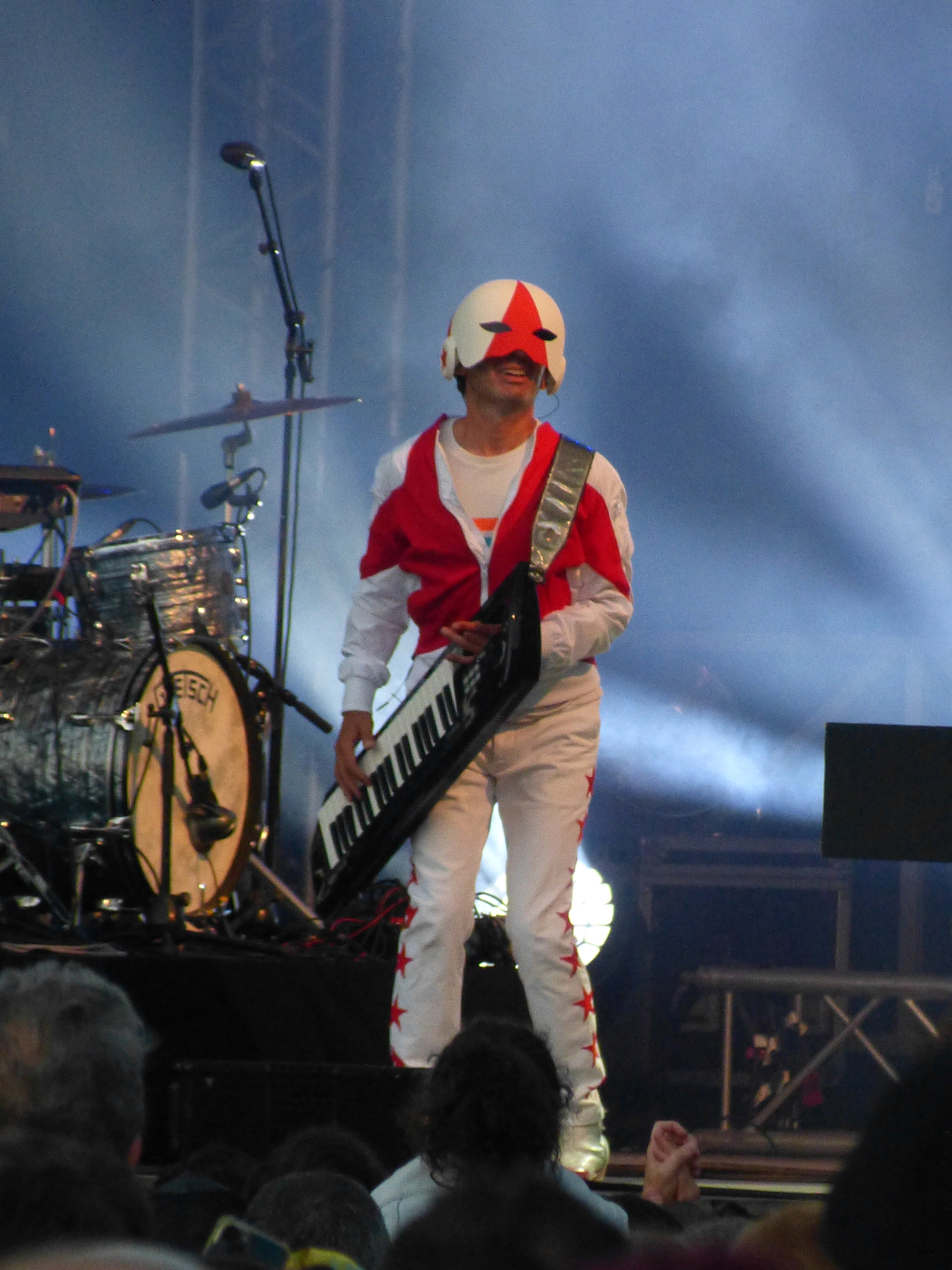
- Cascadeur performing in 2022

Background information
- Birth name: Alexandre Longo
- Born: Metz, France
- Genres: Electronic; trip hop; progressive rock; new-age
- Occupation(s): Musician, songwriter
- Instruments: Vocals; piano; synthesizer
- Years active: 2004–present
- Labels: Decca, Parachute!

Alexandre Longo, better known by his stage name Cascadeur (stuntman), is a French musician from Metz who sings primarily in English. Active since 2004, he has released four studio albums and three soundtrack albums.

== Biography ==
=== Early life ===
Born in the northeastern French city of Metz and descended from Italian lineage, Longo, an only child, began playing the piano at the age of eight. His father, an architect and director of the École supérieure d'art de Lorraine in Metz, who plays the oboe, provided his son with a musical education, complemented by his mother, who plays the piano. His parents' love of music added to Longo's inspiration, as he listened to such artists as the Beatles, Pink Floyd, and numerous jazz records, and the family travelled to Verona each year to attend ballets, operas, and concerts.

=== Beginnings, first album: 2004–2011 ===
After several collaborations with other artists, such as Orwell and Variety Lab, and a stint in the group Fugu, Longo began making music of his own in 2004, under the name Cascadeur, which was suggested by a friend. His stage persona is inspired by a biker action figure he owned as a child. He therefore wears a biker suit with a white helmet adorned with a red star, and his face is often concealed under a luchador mask. Between 2005 and 2008, he self-released three albums. In 2008, he won the CQFD prize organized by the magazine Les Inrockuptibles.

In 2011, Cascadeur issued the singles "Into the Wild" and "Memories", which were followed in March by the album The Human Octopus. This was a collection of re-recorded tracks from his previous albums, one of which was also titled The Human Octopus, with more elaborate instrumentation and input from the American band Midlake on two songs, as well as the Cognac-based Young Rapture Choir. That year, the artist was nominated for a Prix Constantin, which he didn't win.

=== Second album, soundtracks: 2014–2016 ===
Cascadeur's second album, Ghost Surfer, was released in 2014. Prior to a concert at the Saint-Maximin church in Metz, the artist described the new album as "more dynamic and more rhythmic". The record again included collaborations with Midlake members Eric Pulido and Tim Smith, as well as input from DJ Pfel, Stuart A. Staples, Médéric Collignon, Tigran Hamasyan, Anne-Catherine Gillet, Christophe, and a remix by Synapson.

In 2014 and 2016, Longo composed original music for the feature films Le Combat ordinaire (under his own name) and Amis publics (under his stage name), respectively. Later in 2016, he wrote the score for the TV movie On l'appelait Ruby, also under the name Cascadeur.

=== Subsequent releases: 2018–present ===
At the beginning of 2016, Cascadeur announced that he would soon begin work on a new album. Camera was released in March 2018.

His fourth album, Revenant, was released in March 2022 and featured Stuart A. Staples on one track. The record is a lyrical departure for the artist, as a number of its tracks are sung in French.

Cascadeur launched a tour of France in April 2022, which is set to continue until June 2023. He is supported by Jo Cimatti on guitar, bass pedals, and backing vocals; Séraphin Palmeri on keyboards, theremin, and backing vocals; and Charlie Davot on drums and backing vocals.

== Song usage ==
The song "Walker", from the 2011 album The Human Octopus, is used at the end of each episode of the French television series Clash as well as at the end of episode 5 of the series Chérif. The song "Meaning (Choral Version)" accompanies an advertisement for Nestlé chocolate and appears in the French films Heaven Will Wait (2016) and C'est la vie! (2017). The same track also appears in episode 4 of the video game Life Is Strange 2, the first episode of season 6 of Skam France, and episode 4 of the Netflix series Lupin.

== Discography ==
Studio albums

- The Human Octopus (2011)
- Ghost Surfer (2014)
- Camera (2018)
- Revenant (2022)

Soundtracks

- Le Combat ordinaire (2014)
- Amis publics (2016)
- On l'appelait Ruby (2016)
- Premières urgences (2022)
- L'Europe des merveilles (2022)
- Vole Eddie, Vole ! (2023)
- L'Europe des merveilles – Saison 2 (2023)

Contributions

- "Rengaine européenne" Exposition universelle (Orwell, 2015)
