= Arnaud Henriet =

French actor

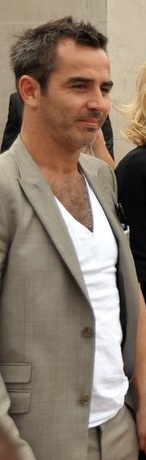
- Arnaud Henriet at the 2011 Cannes Film Festival
- Occupation: Actor
- Years active: 1987–present

Arnaud Henriet is a French actor.

== Filmography ==
Year	Title	Role	Director	Notes
1987	Au revoir les enfants	Negus	Louis Malle	
1998	Quai n° 1	Groussard	Patrick Jamain	TV series (1 episode)
1999	Maître Da Costa		Nicolas Ribowski	TV series (1 episode)
1999	Voleur de coeur	The bailiff	Patrick Jamain	TV movie
2001	Grégoire Moulin contre l'humanité	A football player	Artus de Penguern	
2001	Boomer	Diego	Karim Adda	Short
2002	The Bourne Identity	Wombosi Bodyguard #1	Doug Liman	
2002	Whatever You Say	Valet #2	Guillaume Canet	
2004	Narco	The pizzeria colleague	Tristan Aurouet; Gilles Lellouche	
2004	Mon idole	Marco	Franck Percher	Short
2006	Tell No One	Technicien SRPJ	Guillaume Canet	
2007	Pur week-end	David Watteau	Olivier Doran	
2007	Darling	Copain poker	Birgitte Stærmose	
2008	Mesrine	The doorman	Jean-François Richet	
2008	Beauties at War	Jean-Loup	Patrice Leconte	
2009	Vive les vacances!	Benoît	Stéphane Kappes	TV series (6 episodes)
2009	Le coach	Philippe	Olivier Doran	
2009	Le siffleur	Lieutenant Bruno	Philippe Lefebvre	
2010	Bacon on the Side	Mathieu	Anne Depétrini	
2011	Polisse	Bamako	Maïwenn	
2012	The Players	Anonymous infidel	Alexandre Courtès	(segment 'Les infidèles anonymes")
2012	Les seigneurs	Laura's lawyer	Olivier Dahan	
2011-2013	Platane	Arnaud	Denis Imbert; Éric Judor	TV series (18 episodes)
2013	Le bureau des affaires sexistes		Tristan Aurouet (2)	TV mini-series
2013	Turf	The Cop	Fabien Onteniente	
2013	Jappeloup	Frédéric Cottier	Christian Duguay	
2013	Eyjafjallajökull	Alain's neighbor	Alexandre Coffre	
2014	Jamais le premier soir	Gilles	Melissa Drigeard	
2014	Piégé	Eric Pastres	Yannick Saillet (2)	
2014	Hôtel de la plage	Yann	Christian Merret-Palmair	TV series (6 episodes)
2014	Next Time I'll Aim for the Heart	Locray	Cédric Anger	
2014	Les souvenirs	Policier commissariat	Jean-Paul Rouve	
2014	Do Not Disturb	Léo	Patrice Leconte	
2015	Bis	Le père de Sabrina	Dominique Farrugia	
2015	Les Gorilles	Agent SPHP planque hôtel	Tristan Aurouet	
2017	L'embarras du choix	Cédric	Eric Lavaine	
2017	Rock'n Roll	Nono	Guillaume Canet	
2017	Problemos	Dylan	Eric Judor	
