= Pecan Pie (film) =

- Directed by: Michel Gondry
- Written by: Michel Gondry
- Starring: Jim Carrey
- Release date: 2003
- Running time: 2 minutes
- Language: English

Pecan Pie is a 2003 short film by Michel Gondry, starring Jim Carrey, in which the main character drives around the streets in a bed while singing a song in the style of Elvis Presley. It also features French comic duo Éric et Ramzy as the gas station staff.

It was attached as a bonus clip in the DVD for Eternal Sunshine of the Spotless Mind.

On the October 25, 2014, episode of Saturday Night Live, Jim Carrey performed "Pecan Pie" during the opening monologue.
