= The New Adventures of Aladdin =

- Theatrical release poster
- Directed by: Arthur Benzaquen
- Written by: Daive Cohen
- Produced by: Jérôme Seydoux; Daniel Tordjman; Jonathan Blumenthal; Romain Le Grand; Patrick Quinet; Frantz Richard
- Starring: Kev Adams; William Lebghil; Jean-Paul Rouve; Vanessa Guide; Audrey Lamy; Éric Judor
- Cinematography: Pierre Aïm
- Edited by: Brian Schmitt
- Music by: Maxime Desprez; Michael Tordjman
- Production companies: Pathé; M6 Films; 74 films Artémis Productions
- Distributed by: Pathé
- Release date: 14 October 2015
- Running time: 107 minutes
- Country: France
- Language: French
- Budget: $16 million
- Box office: $35.8 million

The New Adventures of Aladdin (original title: Les Nouvelles Aventures d'Aladin) is a 2015 French comedy film directed by Arthur Benzaquen and starring Kev Adams. A sequel, Alad'2, was released on October 3, 2018.

== Plot ==
On Christmas Eve, Sam and his friend Khaled are disguised as Santas in the Galeries Lafayette, hoping to steal everything that falls into their laps. Unfortunately, Sam is stuck with children aged between 6 and 10 years and they ask him to tell them a story. Initially, he refuses but when the floor manager insists, he tells the story of Aladdin with his own spins and twists. The main characters of the story are a representation of people in his real life. His desire to be a rapper, traveler and rich is incorporated with the children's fantasy requests in the story. In the end, he decides not to steal and, like Aladdin, he owns who he is with his girlfriend, confessing that he is not a financier or someone who does philanthropic work, but a simple poor person who loves her dearly.

== Cast ==
- Kev Adams as Aladin / Sam
- William Lebghil as Khaled
- Jean-Paul Rouve as The Vizier
- Vanessa Guide as Princess Shallia / Sofia
- Audrey Lamy as Rababa / Barbara
- Arthur Benzaquen as The Magician
- Éric Judor as The Genius
- Michel Blanc as The Sultan / Sofia's father
- Ramzy Bedia as Balouad
- La Fouine as The Deceitful
- Cyril Hanouna as Radio Voice
- Michaël Cohen as The Twin Brother
- Youssef Hajdi as Cheik Loukoums
- Ali Karamoko as Kamel Toe

== Sequel ==
A sequel, Alad'2, was confirmed in August 2017. It was released on October 3, 2018, with Adams, Guide, Rouve, and Judor reprising their roles.
