= La Tour 2 contrôle infernale =

- Theatrical release poster
- Directed by: Éric Judor
- Written by: Ramzy Bedia; Éric Judor; Nicolas Orzeckowski
- Produced by: Alain Goldman; Ramzy Bedia; Éric Judor; Luc Bourdarias; David Claikens; Serge de Poucques; Julien Deris; Marc Dujardin; David Gauquié; Sylvain Goldberg; Etienne Mallet; Alex Verbaere
- Starring: Ramzy Bedia; Éric Judor
- Cinematography: Vincent Muller
- Edited by: Jean-Denis Buré
- Production company: Légende Films
- Distributed by: Légende Distribution
- Release date: 10 February 2016
- Running time: 88 minutes
- Country: France
- Language: French
- Budget: $14.2 million
- Box office: $2.4 million

La Tour de contrôle infernale (or La Tour 2 contrôle infernale on the billing, often used in the medias) is a French-Belgian surreal crime comedy film written, produced and starred by Éric Judor and Ramzy Bedia, released in 2016.

It is a prequel of the film La Tour Montparnasse Infernale, directed by Charles Nemes and released in 2001.

== Synopsis ==
1982. Ernest Krakenkrick and Bachir Bouzouk are about to become pilots in the French army. But after the bad consequences of a test undertaken with the centrifuge, they are forced to give up their dream. They are eventually given the position of baggage handler at Orly-West Airport in Paris. But one night, there is a hostage-taking in the airport and the "Moustachious", a group of terrorists, take hold of the control tower. While the Home Secretary tries to make a deal with the criminals, Ernest and Bachir do their best to save the airport...

== Cast ==
- Éric Judor as Ernest Krakenkriek
- Ramzy Bedia as Bachir Bouzouk
- Marina Foïs as Karine Lanceval (mother of Stéphanie Lanceval of the first movie)
- Philippe Katerine as Colonel Janouniou
- Serge Riaboukine as "Le Méchant" (literally: The Villain) (brother of Machin of the first movie)
- Lionel Beyeke as Jean-Peter McCallaway
- William Gay as General Mangedeurme
- Grégoire Oestermann as The minister of the interior
- Michel Nabokoff as the father
- Charles Nemes as the consultant (Cameo appearance)
- Joel Jernidier as Zavier Le Black
- Alexis Van Stratum as Jean-Loup Muselime

== Reception ==
La Tour 2 contrôle infernale received mixed reviews.

== Box office ==
The movie attracted 211 000 cinema-goers during the first week after being released, against 2.1 millions in total for La Tour Montparnasse infernale.
