= La Tour Montparnasse Infernale =

2001 film by Charles Nemes

- Film Poster
- Directed by: Charles Nemes
- Produced by: Christian Fechner
- Starring: Éric Judor; Ramzy Bedia; Marina Foïs; Serge Riaboukine
- Cinematography: Étienne Fauduet
- Edited by: Dominique Galliéni
- Music by: Jean-Claude Vannier
- Distributed by: UGC Fox Distribution
- Release date: 28 March 2001
- Running time: 92 minutes
- Country: France
- Language: French
- Budget: $9.6 million
- Box office: $20.6 million

La Tour Montparnasse Infernale is a 2001 French crime comedy film directed by Charles Nemes and co-written and starred by Eric Judor, Ramzy Bedia and Pierre-François Martin-Laval. When it came out in cinemas in Canada, it was translated into Don't Die Too Hard in reference to Die Hard. The movie is a box office success, grossing 20.6 million for a budget of 9.6 million. A prequel, La Tour 2 contrôle infernale was released in 2016.

== Plot ==
Éric and Ramzy are working as window washers at the Montparnasse skyscraper in Paris. Eric thinks that he has a date with beautiful Marie-Joëlle (real name is Stéphanie Lanceval), They stay at work late, but a gang of terrorists seize the tower and take its late-night occupants (including Marie-Joëlle) hostage. Knowing that only they can save the day, Éric and Ramzy swing into action.

== Cast ==
- Éric Judor and Ramzy Bedia as the windows washers
- Marina Foïs as Stéphanie Lanceval (Marie-Joëlle)
- Serge Riaboukine as Michel Vignault a.k.a. Machin
- Michel Puterflam as Lanceval
- Bô Gaultier de Kermoal as Ming
- Pierre Semmler as Hans
- Edgar Givry as Greg
- Georges Trillat as Peter
- Bruce Johnson as Chris
- Laurence Pollet-Villard as Sylvie
- Pierre-François Martin-Laval as Tran
- Olivier Balazuc as Fils 4 Lanceval
- Jean-Claude Dauphin as Le commissaire
- Étienne Fauduet as Séparatiste corse
- Benoît Giros as Jean-Louis
- François Goizé as Pilote hélicoptère
- Vincent Haquin as Chef GIGN
- Thibault Lacroix as Fils 1 Lanceval
- Grégory Lemoigne as Fils 3 Lanceval
- Frederic Moreau as Séparatiste basque
- Gyuri Nemes as Séparatiste Breton
- Marc Raffat as Pilote hélicoptère
- Lionel Roux as Homme du RAID
- Philippe Schwartz as Fils 5 Lanceval
- Volodia Serre as Fils 2 Lanceval
- Joey Starr as Youston
- Omar Sy as Taxi driver
- Fred Testot as Policier fumeur
