= Pierre-François Martin-Laval =

French actor, film director, screenwriter and theatre director

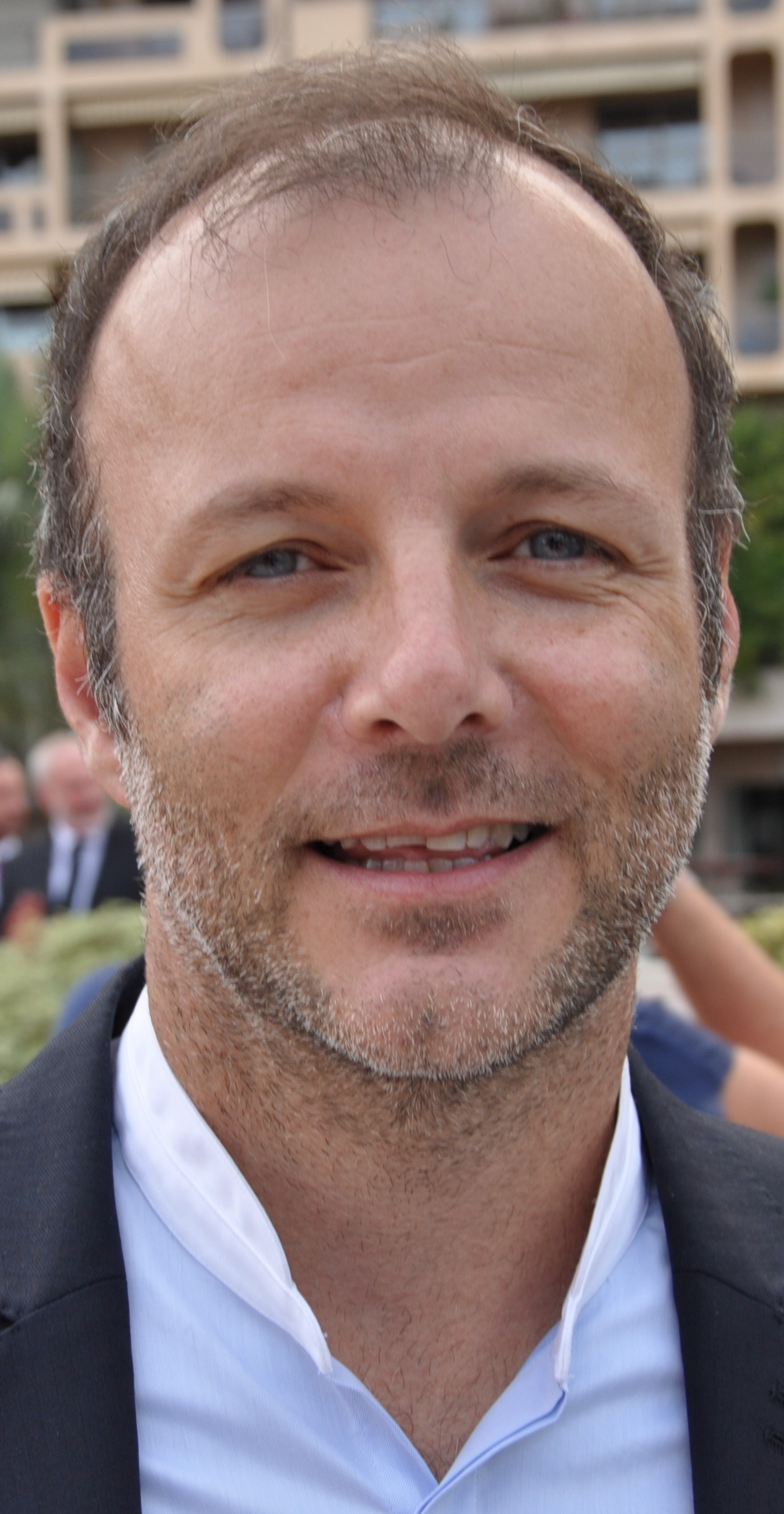
- Martin-Laval in 2015
- Born: 25 June 1968 (age 58); Marseille, France
- Occupations: Actor, Film director, Screenwriter, Theatre director

Pierre-François Martin-Laval (nicknamed "PEF") is a French actor, film director, screenwriter and theatre director. PEF is well known in France for his acting performances in musical comedy but also in serious plays. He studied at the famous French school of acting Cours Florent. During his drama studies he met the friends with whom he formed the comedy team 'Les Robins des Bois' (The Robin Hoods) in 1996. Initially called The Royal Imperial Green Rabbit Company, they renamed themselves after their first significant success, a play entitled Robins des bois.

Les Robins des Bois first appeared on television in La Grosse Emission, a regular TV show on the channel Comédie! in which they presented short and utterly crazy plays. They quickly became popular and made appearances in French movies.

== Filmography ==
- L'un dans l'autre (2016) Bruno Chiche, with Stephane De Groodt, Louise Bourgoinl, Aure Atika
- Mon poussin (2016) Frederique Forestier, with Isabelle Nanty, Thomas Soliveres
- Un jour mon prince ! (2016) Flavia Coste, with Catherine Jacob
- Vilaine (2008) Jean-Patrick Benes, Allan Mauduit, with Marilou Berry, Chantal Lauby, Frédérique Bel
- Modern Love (2008) Stéphane Kazandjian, with Alexandra Lamy, Stéphane Rousseau, Bérénice Bejo and Pierre-François Martin-Laval
- Essaye-moi (2006) Pierre-François Martin-Laval, with Julie Depardieu, Kad Merad and Pierre Richard
- Un ticket pour l'espace (2006) Éric Lartigau, with Kad et Olivier
- Casablanca Driver (2004) Maurice Barthélemy
- RRRrrrr!!! (2004) Alain Chabat
- Les clefs de bagnole (2003) Laurent Baffie
- La Prophétie des grenouilles (2003) Jacques-Rémy Girerd, with Michel Piccoli, Anouk Grinberg, Annie Girardot
- Le Bison (et sa voisine Dorine) (2003) Isabelle Nanty, with Isabelle Nanty, Édouard Baer et il aime la music et le toilette
- Astérix & Obélix : Mission Cléopâtre (2002 Alain Chabat, with Christian Clavier, Gérard Depardieu
- La Grande Vie (2001) directed by Philippe Dajoux with Michel Boujenah, Patrick Bosso, Christian Charmetant
- Le mal de mère (2001) directed by Édouard Molinaro, with Frédéric Diefenthal, Line Renaud
- La tour Montparnasse infernale (2001) directed by Charles Némès, with Éric Judor, Ramzy Bedia, Marina Foïs
- La Vérité si je mens ! 2 (2001) directed by Thomas Gilou, with José Garcia, Gad Elmaleh, Richard Anconina
- Les Frères Sœur (2000) directed by Frédéric Jardin, with José Garcia, Denis Podalydès, Jackie Berroyer
- Girl on the Bridge (1999) directed by Patrice Leconte, with Daniel Auteuil, Vanessa Paradis
- Trafic d'influence (1999) Dominique Farrugia, with Thierry Lhermitte, Gérard Jugnot, Aure Atika
- Zooloo (1999) a short movie directed by Nicolas Bazz, with Pierre Richard
- Serial Lover (1998) directed by James Huth, with Michèle Laroque, Albert Dupontel, Zinedine Soualem
- Mémoires d'un jeune con (1996) directed by Patrick Aurignac, with Christophe Hemon, François Périer, Patrick Aurignac
- Le collecteur (1992) a short movie directed by Ronan Fournier-Christol, with André Badin, Jean-Christophe Berjon, Julie Lopes-Curval and Éric Massot
- French voice of Emile in Ratatouille, Pixar studio, August 2007.

== Director ==
- 2006 : Essaye-moi
- 2009 : King Guillaume
- 2013 : Serial Teachers
- 2015 : Serial Teachers 2
- 2018 : Gaston Lagaffe

== Television ==
- Capitaine Marleau

French television crime drama series; (2018, Season 1 Episode 12, 23 October, "Double Jeu", "Double Dealing", as Paul Dalvet)

- The Disappearance

French television crime drama series (2015) as Julien Morel

== Theatre ==
=== Actor ===
- Robin des Bois d'à peu près Alexandre Dumas, adapted from Alexandre Dumas (1997, stage director Pierre-François Martin-Laval)
- Les caprices de Mariannes (1996, Jean-Paul Rouve)
- Le goût de la Hierarchie (1996, directed by Édouard Baer, with Isabelle Nanty)
- Mémoire et intamarre (1995, V. Martin)
- L'ascenseur (1994, M. Henada)
- L'arbramouche (stage director par V. Martin)
- La mouette (stage director Isabelle Nanty)
- Reniflard and Co. adapted from Marx Brothers (1993, Jean-Christophe Berjon)
- Un couple ordinaire (1993, R. Kuperberg)
- On garde le moral (1992, A. Halimi)
- Le bébé de Monsieur Laurent, Roland Topor (1991, stage director: Jean-Christophe Berjon)
- Georges Dandin (1991, S. Brisé)

=== Stage director ===
- Patrick Bosso Exagère (2000, in Palais des Glaces)
- Kad et Olivier (1999, au Café de la Danse)
- Robin des Bois d'à peu près Alexandre Dumas, adapted from Alexandre Dumas (1997, in Théâtre de la Gaîté-Montparnasse)
- Éric et Ramzy (1996–1998, in the Bec Fin, the Café de la Gare, Le Splendid and in the Palais des Glaces)
- En attendant l'Olympia with Pascal Vincent (1995-1996 barnstorming in Switzerland)
- Capri c'est fini with Kad&Olivier (1998, in Café de la Danse)
- Presque grande (1997, in Théâtre Clavel)
