= Éric Judor =

French actor, comedian and filmmaker (born 1968)

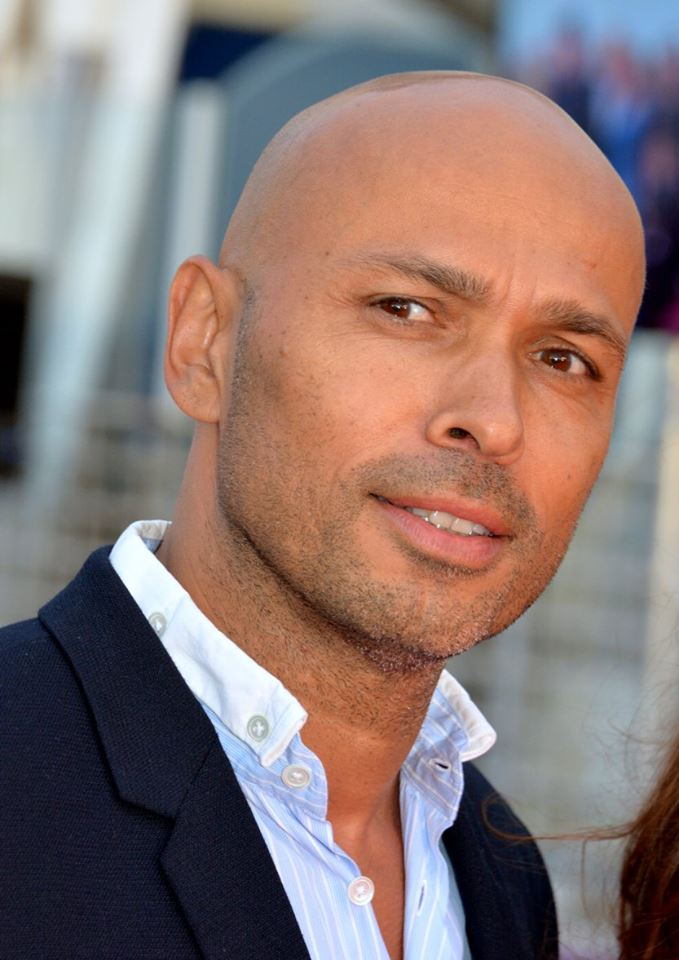
- Judor at the 2018 Cabourg Film Festival
- Born: 25 July 1968 (age 57); Meaux, Seine-et-Marne, France
- Occupations: Actor, screenwriter, film director, producer
- Years active: 1996–present

Éric Judor (French pronunciation: [eʁik ʒydɔʁ]; born 25 July 1968), sometimes simply called Éric, is a French actor, director, screenwriter and comedian. He gained notoriety by forming, together with Ramzy Bedia, the comedy duo Éric et Ramzy.

After several feature films with his friend Ramzy, he began a career as a solo comic actor. He created, wrote and produced the series Platane (2011–2019) for Canal+, but he is also the headliner of the comedies Mohamed Dubois (2013), Problemos (2017) and Roulez jeunesse (2018). He appears in the series H (1998–2002), which made him particularly known together with his friends Ramzy Beria, Pierre Chabrier and Jamel Debbouze.

== Life and career ==
Judor's father was French from the Guadeloupe Region and his mother from Austria. After being a tour guide in the United States for two years and then in Canada, he worked as a logistics coordinator at Bouygues. There he organized the schedules of the engineers who worked on the company's oil platforms. He now lives in Dampierre-en-Yvelines with his wife and two daughters, Jana and Luna.

== Youth and training ==
At the age of 18, he attempted a career as a professional tennis player in the United States. His career proved unsuccessful, though he did manage to defeat Hicham Arazi, twice quarter-finalist at Roland Garros, while he was ranked 300th in the world. He distinguished himself in particular during this match by an exceptional Tweener passing shot.

== Filmography ==
=== Films ===
- Le Ciel, les Oiseaux et... ta mère ! (1999) as the journalist
- La Tour Montparnasse Infernale (2001) as Eric
- Pecan Pie (2003) as Gas Station Attendant
- Double Zéro (2004) as Benoît "Ben" Rivière
- Les Dalton (2004), Joe Dalton
- Once Upon a Time in the Oued (2005) as a shopkeeper
- Barfuss (2005) as the man in the car
- Steak (2007) as Blaze/Chuck
- 2 Alone in Paris (2008) as Gervais
- Lascars (2009) as Chinese Man/Airport Security Guard
- Neuilly sa mère ! (2009) as the inner city mediator
- Bacon on the Side (2010) as The vigil
- Halal Police d'État (2011) as the Kabyle
- Au Bistro du Coin (2011) as the nurse
- Hénaut Président (2011) as Himself
- Les Seigneurs (2012) as George
- Wrong (2012) as Victor
- Mohamed Dubois (2013) as Mohamed Dubois
- Wrong Cops (2014) as Rough
- The New Adventures of Aladdin (2015) as the Genie
- La Tour 2 contrôle infernale (2016) as Ernest Krakenkriek
- Hibou (2016) as Marius
- Problemos (2017) as Victor
- Alad'2 (2018) as the Genie
- The Last Mercenary (2021) as Paul Lesueur

=== Television ===
- Jamais deux sans toi...t (1995) as Plateau
- H (1998–2002) as Aymé Cesaire
- Ratz (2003–2004) as Razmo
- Moot-Moot (2007) as Bernard MootMoot
- Platane (2011–2019) as Eric; also creator, director and producer
- Bref (2012) as Jean-Paul
- Weekend Family (2022-) as Fred
- Represent (2022-) as William Crozon
