= Ramzy Bedia =

French actor, screenwriter and film director

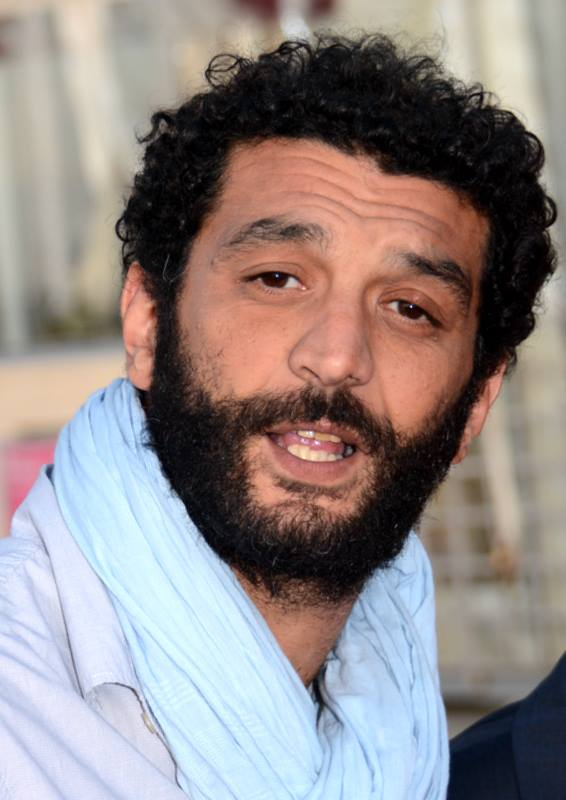
- Ramzy Bedia at the Cabourg Film Festival in 2014
- Born: Ramzy Habib El Haq Bedia; 10 March 1972 (age 54); Paris, France
- Occupations: Actor; screenwriter; film director
- Years active: 1994–present
- Relatives: Melha Bedia (sister)

Ramzy Habib El Haq Bedia (Arabic: رمزي حبيب الحق بيديا; born 10 March 1972) is a French actor, screenwriter, and film director of Algerian descent.

He started his career as a comedian in 1994 after meeting Éric Judor, with whom he formed the duo Éric et Ramzy. They started their own TV show on channel M6.

In 1998, Bedia and Judor played alongside Jamel Debbouze in the hit French TV series H. In 1999, he acted in his first movie, Le Ciel, les Oiseaux et... ta mère!, by the French director Djamel Bensalah.

Bedia's breakthrough role was as a window cleaner in the 2001 Charles Nemes film La Tour Montparnasse Infernale, which he also co-wrote with Judor.

In 2004, Éric et Ramzy starred in the movie Les Dalton and the spy comedy Double Zéro, directed by Philippe Haïm. Bedia's other films include Once Upon a Time in the Oued (2005), Bled Number One (2006) and Neuilly Yo Mama! (2009). In 2018 he played the villain Zorglub in The Adventures of Spirou and Fantasio.

== Selected filmography ==
- La Tour Montparnasse Infernale (2001)
- Ratz (2003–2004)
- Pecan Pie (2003)
- Double Zéro (2003)
- Les Dalton (2004)
- Once Upon a Time in the Oued (2005)
- Bled Number One (2006)
- Steak (2007)
- 2 Alone in Paris (2008)
- Neuilly sa mère! (2009)
- Le Concert (2009)
- Bacon on the Side (2010)
- Beur sur la ville (2011)
- Headwinds (2011)
- Dream Team (Les Seigneurs) (2012)
- Lolo (2015)
- The New Adventures of Aladdin (2015)
- I'm All Yours (2015)
- Pattaya (2016)
- La Tour 2 contrôle infernale (2016)
- Chacun sa vie et son intime conviction (2017)
- Call My Agent ! (TV series / 1 episode) (2017)
- Coexister (2017)
- Épouse-moi mon pote (2017)
- Taxi 5 (2018)
- Alad'2 (2018)
- South Terminal (2019)
- Merveilles à Montfermeil (2020)
- Lost Bullet (2020)
- Cette musique ne joue pour personne (2021)
- Medellin (2023)
- Of Money and Blood (TV series) (2023)
