= No Limit (TV series) =

French TV series (2012-2015)

- TV poster
- Genre: Action-adventure; Spy fiction Thriller
- Created by: Luc Besson; Franck Philippon
- Written by: Luc Besson; Franck Philippon; Emilie Clamart-Marsollat; Patrick Renault
- Directed by: Didier Le Pêcheur; Julien Despaux
- Starring: Vincent Elbaz; Anne Girouard; Hélène Seuzaret; Sarah Brannens; Christian Brendel
- Theme music composer: Erwann Kermorvant
- Composer: Erwann Kermorvant
- Country of origin: France
- Original language: French
- No. of seasons: 3
- No. of episodes: 22 (list of episodes)

Production
- Executive producer: Benjamin Dupont-Jubien
- Producers: Luc Besson; Thomas Anargyros; Edouard de Vésinne
- Production location: Marseille
- Cinematography: Ludovic Colbeau-Justin
- Editors: Christine Lucas Navarro; Olivier Gourlay; Yves Beloniak
- Camera setup: Single-camera
- Running time: 51-68 minutes
- Production company: EuropaCorp Television

Original release
- Network: RTL-TVI (Belgium); TF1 (France)
- Release: November 5, 2012 – January 29, 2015

No Limit is a 2012 French television action-adventure series created by filmmaker Luc Besson with Franck Philippon through Besson's EuropaCorp company. Along with Transporter: The Series, it represents one of Besson's first forays into television, although this time as a writer as well as a producer.

The series follows Vincent Libérati, played by Vincent Elbaz, a DGSE agent plagued with an incurable disease who accepts an offer from a mysterious secret organization to perform missions on French soil in exchange for an experimental treatment, which brings him closer to his temperamental teenage daughter Lola, his ex-wife Alexandra, and his suspicious cop sister Juliette.

No Limit premiered in Belgium on RTL-TVI on November 5, 2012 and ten days later in France on TF1. A second and third season were confirmed on November 29, before the French airing of the first season's last two episodes. International broadcast rights are held by TF1 International.

== Plot ==
A potentially fatal brain tumor forces Vincent Libérati to abandon the glamour of a globetrotting secret agent's life and return to Marseille to be close to his teen daughter Lola and ex-wife Alexandra. In order to receive an experimental medical treatment, Vincent agrees to join Hydra, a confidential organization set up by secret services to fight organized crime on the French Riviera with illegal means. Meanwhile, his personal life isn't rosy either as he still isn't over Alexandra and is still trying to figure out Lola.

== Cast ==
=== Main characters ===
- Vincent Elbaz as Vincent Libérati, the protagonist, a French covert agent recently diagnosed with a brain tumor who relocates to Marseille to be closer to his estranged family, who know nothing about his illness or his job and believe him to be a burglar alarm installer.
- Anne Girouard as Commissioner Juliette Lambert, Vincent's sister, a homicide detective recently posted in Marseille who ironically suffers from a devastating pollen allergy and whose investigations often cross paths with Vincent's missions.
- Hélène Seuzaret as Alexandra, Vincent's ex-wife who he is still in love with but who is getting ready to remarry.
- Sarah Brannens as Lola Libérati, Vincent's 15-year-old daughter who isn't ready to forgive him for not being there when she was growing up.
- Christian Brendel as Colonel De Boissieu, the officer in charge of Hydra, the secret organization Vincent Libérati works for.

=== Recurring characters ===
- Philippe Hérisson as Bertrand Rey, Alexandra's fiancé who is revealed (in the season one finale) to be secretly working for Hydra as their money-laundering expert.
- Vanessa Guide as Marie Dulac, a covert agent colleague of Vincent's, who is also romantically attracted to him.
- Damien Jouillerot as Tony Massart, a small-time crook who reluctantly befriends and helps Vincent.
- Franck de la Personne as Professor Grimberg
- Samir Boitard as Reda
- Makita Samba as Arthur Lefranc
- Jean-Marie Paris as Bouly
- Vanessa Guide as Marie Dulac
- Véronique Kapoyan as Commandant Nadine Leroy
- Martin Darlan as Virgile
- Mylène Demongeot as Christine Libérati
- Philippe Nahon as Victor Cerda
- Patrick Chesnais as Claude (Season 3)
- Claude Brasseur as Brunetti (Season 3)

== Episodes ==
Season	Episodes	Originally released		DVD & Blu-ray release date (Region 2)
Season	Episodes	First released	Last released	DVD & Blu-ray release date (Region 2)
1	6	November 5, 2012	November 19, 2012	9 January 2013
2	8	November 14, 2013	December 5, 2013	TBA
3	8	January 8, 2015	January 29, 2015	TBA

=== Season 1 (2012) ===
No.	Title	Directed by	Written by	Belgian release date	French release date	Viewers/Share (Belgium)	Viewers/Share (France)
1	"Episode 1"	Didier Le Pêcheur	Luc Besson & Franck Philippon	November 5, 2012	November 15, 2012	217,130 (18%)	7,071,000 (27.5%)
Vincent Libérati, French counterintelligence's best agent, is on a mission in Africa when he finds out that he has a brain tumor. He decides to leave the secret services and live out his final months in Marseille, near his daughter Lola, whom he allowed to grow up for too long without being there, and his ex-wife Alexandra, who is about to start a new life with a brilliant local attorney. Without telling them about his illness, Vincent tries to spend as much time with them as possible, while maintaining contact with his former handlers, who offer him top-secret missions in return for an experimental treatment for his tumor. Vincent's first assignment is to collar a major drug trafficker, who has constantly outwitted the conventional police force. The services put all the resources of a shady new network codenamed Hydra at Vincent's disposal, but he must succeed without arousing the suspicions of his sister Juliette, a young police captain who has recently been posted to the region to solve a murder in which the trafficker is implicated. A complicated investigation lies ahead for our hero, trying to navigate a course between his sister, his ex and his daughter...
2	"Episode 2"	Didier Le Pêcheur	Luc Besson & Franck Philippon	November 5, 2012	November 15, 2012	120,100 (20,5%)	6,225,000 (33.2%)
As Juliette rapidly closes in on them, the drug traffickers resort to abducting her to stop her investigation. Vincent is on the point of taking down the big boss, but quickly has to change his plans. Not only does he have to catch them in the act for the authorities' benefit, he also has to free his sister from the gangsters' secret hideout. Despite the symptoms of his sickness reappearing at the worst possible moment, Vincent accomplishes his near-impossible mission...
3	"Episode 3"	Julien Despaux	Emilie Clamart-Marsollat	November 12, 2012	November 22, 2012	197,700 (17,4%)	6,859,000 (26.1%)
Vincent's next assignment is to infiltrate an arms trafficking network to unmask the mysterious boss, who has escaped all the police's attempts to capture him. At the same time, Juliette is investigating the murder of man who died in a hail of Kalashnikov bullets. Unwittingly, she finds herself impinging on her brother's mission. Vincent decides to make the most of the situation and piggybacks Juliette's investigation until she identifies her target. He also receives significant help from Marie, a provocatively beautiful call girl who works for Hydra and whose regular appearances in our hero's life cannot fail to arouse the jealousy of Alexandra, Vincent's ex...
4	"Episode 4"	Julien Despaux	Emilie Clamart-Marsollat	November 12, 2012	November 22, 2012	158,300 (23,4%)	6,500,000 (29.2%)
Juliette zealously moves her investigation forward by arresting intermediaries that Vincent planned to use as pawns in his mission. Even worse, she arrests Marie, which forces Vincent to organize a risky escape operation in his sister's police station. At the same time, Hydra makes a big push to smoke out the boss of the arms trafficking gang by springing a major rival from jail. Vincent once more finds himself torn between the dangers of his mission and the complications provided by the women in his life, especially as Alexandra seems to be having doubts about her upcoming marriage and considering the possibility of starting over with Vincent...
5	"Episode 5"	Didier Le Pêcheur	Patrick Renault	November 19, 2012	November 29, 2012	214,700 (17,8%)	6,883,000 (25.7%)
Working undercover on Marseille's docks, Vincent is trying to dismantle a human-trafficking operation that smuggles people into the port in containers. He is nearly unmasked by a dockworker and accidentally kills the man after a frenzied pursuit. Unaware of her brother's involvement, Juliette is assigned to the case of the dockworker's death, while Hydra piles the pressure on Vincent to take down the gang before his identity is revealed. At the same time, his personal life is further complicated by his improving relationship with Alexandra and the discovery that his disease is incurable. Vincent won't allow himself to make false promises to the woman he loves...
6	"Episode 6"	Didier Le Pêcheur	Patrick Renault	November 19, 2012	November 29, 2012	159,600 (24,8%)	6,300,000 (27.7%)
Just when Juliette discovers that Vincent is almost certainly responsible for the dockworker's death, Lola is kidnapped by Olga Sverdenko, the head of the gang that Vincent is gunning for. Vincent refuses to give up and goes on the run to rescue his daughter without telling anyone. But as he gets closer to Sverdenko, the symptoms of his disease get worse...

=== Season 2 (2013) ===
No.	Title	Directed by	Written by	Belgian release date	French release date	Viewers/Share (Belgium)	Viewers/Share (France)
1	"Blood Diamonds"	Barthélémy Grossmann	Luc Besson & Patrick Renault	TBA	November 14, 2013	TBD	TBA
Vincent is on the trail of The Black Hand, a diamond smuggling ring. His mission is made all the more urgent by the head of the gang being implicated in the arson attack on Lola's high school, for which poor Arthur has been wrongly accused! For Vincent, the mission involves working on a daily basis with Bertrand, who has become Hydra's money-laundering expert and is about to marry Vincent's ex-wife. The atmosphere at Hydra is electric.
2	"Undercover"	Barthélémy Grossmann	Luc Besson & Emilie Clamart-Marsollat	TBA	November 14, 2013	TBD	TBA
To infiltrate the nefarious criminal organisation that Hydra is tracking down, and win the trust of Koskas, its boss, Vincent has to steal back from the cops a consignment of smuggled diamonds. Meanwhile, Alex enters the lion's den when she starts to investigate the property company that she blames for the high school arson, which is incidentally owned by Koskas.
3	"The Heist"	David Morley	Luc Besson & Laurent Sarfati	TBA	November 21, 2013	TBD	TBA
Working undercover for Koskas's organisation, Vincent is given his first assignment: he must carry out a hold-up and a hit, or face being arrested by the police. It is clearly a mandatory test of his loyalty - nobody works for the Black Hand without first getting blood on their hands. Lola, meanwhile, falls for Virgile, an eco-warrior whose activism she admires, much to Arthur's dismay.
4	"Dead or Alive"	David Morley	Luc Besson & Patrick Renault	TBA	November 21, 2013	TBD	TBA
To avoid his cover being blown, Vincent has to save the sinister Koskas from multiple threats, including Juliette, who is investigating the bank heist. Meanwhile, the gangster is seriously hitting on Alex. Juliette's hunt for the "masked vigilante" brings her dangerously close to Hydra's big secret.
5	"The Prototype"	Frédéric Berthe	Luc Besson & Patrick Renault	TBA	November 28, 2013	TBD	TBA
Vincent must steal a revolutionary drone prototype from the French army to use in the fight against Koskas, who now suspects that Bertrand is a mole and asks Vincent to eliminate him.
6	"High-Risk Wedding"	Frédéric Berthe	Luc Besson & Patrick Renault	TBA	November 28, 2013	TBD	TBA
Vincent has 24 hours to foil the threat of a drone equipped with missiles, while agonising about Alex and Bertrand walking down the aisle. He must also dodge his sister's suspicions that he is the masked vigilante.
7	"Gone Fishing"	Ludovic Colbeau-Justin	Franck Philippon & Luc Besson	TBA	December 5, 2013	TBD	TBA
Just when Vincent thought he could take a break and kick back with the family, duty calls. He must step up against Koskas's devoted right-hand man. Meanwhile, Hydra is under threat as Juliette closes in on the organisation's big secret.
8	"Chemical Pain"	Ludovic Colbeau-Justin	Franck Philippon & Luc Besson	TBA	December 5, 2013	TBD	TBA
Abandoned on all sides, hunted down by his sister and the authorities, Vincent has four hours to prevent a spectacular attack that is likely to claim the lives of Alex and his daughter.

=== Season 3 (2015) ===
No.	Title	Directed by	Written by	Belgian release date	French release date	Viewers/Share (Belgium)	Viewers/Share (France)
1	"Episode 15"	Ludovic Colbeau-Justin	Patrick Renault	TBA	January 8, 2015	TBD	TBA
Vincent breaks his father Claude, a notorious criminal in the Marseille underworld, out of a columbian prison because he badly needs a liver transplant after ingesting toxic gas on his last mission.
2	"Episode 16"	Ludovic Colbeau-Justin	Emilie Clamart-Marsollat	TBA	January 8, 2015	TBD	TBA
Vincent must bring down a trafficker in counterfeit notes, Jacques Brunetti, who is a candidate in the Marseille elections and an old friend-turned-rival of Claude. But Juliette is also targeting him.
3	"Episode 17 (part 1 of 2)"	Akim Isker	Laurent Sarfati	TBA	January 15, 2015	TBD	TBA
Claude tries to regain his old ground in Marseille but is kidnapped and taken to the Russian consulate. And he's made such an art of evading the police that Juliette and Vincent struggle to find him.
4	"Episode 18 (part 2 of 2)"	Akim Isker	Camille De Castelnau	TBA	January 15, 2015	TBD	TBA
Hidden in an air freight container, Vincent, Claude and young agent Zoe are transported to Chechnya. It's a tense game of survival, but can they avoid capture without causing a diplomatic incident?
5	"Episode 19"	Frédéric Berthe	Patrick Renault	TBA	January 22, 2015	TBD	TBA
Vincent pursues a ship carrying a haul of cocaine to Marseille but fails to locate the illegal cargo. It's a race against time to find the missing drugs at sea before Juliette's team beat him to it.
6	"Episode 20"	Frédéric Berthe	Emilie Clamart-Marsollat & Patrick Renault	TBA	January 22, 2015	TBD	TBA
The Liberati family go on a weekend away for a special birthday celebration, but a team of Colombians are sent to Marseille to recover the missing drugs haul and suspicion increasingly falls on Claude.
7	"Episode 21 (part 1 of 2)"	Ludovic Colbeau-Justin	Camille De Castelnau	TBA	January 29, 2015	TBD	TBA
Things go from bad to worse for Vincent when he is implicated in Claude's cocaine trafficking case, and then a face from the past kidnaps Lola and orders him to rob a bank in exchange for her release.
8	"Episode 22 (part 2 of 2)"	Ludovic Colbeau-Justin	Yann Le Gal	TBA	January 29, 2015	TBD	TBA
Vincent and Claude plan and execute the bank heist with Juliette's assistance. Meanwhile Lola and Arthur escape, but Lola is in turn kidnaped by Hydra.

== Production ==
=== Conception ===
French channel TF1 had been asking Luc Besson to create a TV show for them since 2005, but the filmmaker kept turning them down due to his unfamiliarity with television, which is also the reason he sold the rights for Transporter: The Series. However, the desire to penetrate the television market engrained itself in Besson's mind and in April 2010, his company EuropaCorp acquired Cipango, a profitable production company specialized in television, with produced shows such as Les Bleus and the international co-production XIII. No Limit is the first series to come out of a September 2011 deal between the company, rebranded EuropaCorp Television, and TF1. Based on an original idea by Luc Besson, the series was co-created with screenwriter Franck Philippon, whose first feature, À ton image, was produced by EuropaCorp, and was announced by TF1 on April 6, 2012. According to Philippon, the ambition was to show things that had never been seen in a French show, and surprise the viewer. The creators started out wanting to tell the story of a father and his daughter, injected with a mix of action and comedy and Philippon added that the challenge, and the show's strength, was that balance of action, comedic and emotional moments.

The show was titled after the discipline of No-Limits Apnea. Diving holds a special place in Luc Besson's heart, whose parents were scuba diving instructors, and who had planned to become a marine biologist himself before a diving accident ended those plans and whose third film, The Big Blue, was all about the subject. In addition, the title was meant to give the show an international-sounding name in order to widen its appeal and was also a reference to the state of the hero, who is afflicted with a brain tumor. The writers took inspiration from other TV shows to portray the condition, chief among them Breaking Bad.

Producer Thomas Anargyros revealed the season's budget to be 9 million euros, which is about 30% higher than TF1's usual productions and 50% than the French average. The show is one of several ambitious new shows commissioned by TF1, along with Falco and the English-language series Jo, Crossing Lines and Taxi Brooklyn that showcase the channel's desire to become a bigger player in the international market and a change in French channels' conception of TV shows.

=== Format ===
For the first season, each mission lasts two episodes, which is also the pace at which the directors rotate. The typical episode lasts slightly more than 50 minutes, with the exception of the pilot episode which is nearly 70 minutes long. The series has been described as being very much in line with the rest of Luc Besson's oeuvre, with important means and much impressive action mixed with comedy.

The second season featured a single story arc.

=== Casting ===
The relationship between Vincent Elbaz and Sarah Brannens' characters is one of the central elements of the show.

No Limit represents Vincent Elbaz's first regular role in a TV series and his performance was widely touted in the media as one of the highlights of the show. The 41-year-old actor was dubious about how the show could compare to similar American productions, but was sold thanks to Luc Besson's involvement and the ambition of the project. He described his role as "James Bond with daily problems" and his character as particularly complex, due to his lies eating him up inside but also provoking hilarious scenes. Elbaz drew inspiration from Bruce Willis' performance in Die Hard and had to train intensively for the role, learning Pencak Silat and Krav Maga, and confront his fear of heights, as he insisted on performing the majority of his own stunts. He said it was the first time he had been offered such a role and that though he believes television can never reach the level of cinema, he does not think he has ever seen anything like No Limit on French television.

On the other hand, the show marks the second lead role in a TV series for Anne Girouard, after six years of portraying Guinevere in the successful Arthurian comedy Kaamelott. Several media outlets singled out the 36-year-old's performance as one of the show's strengths. The actress was pregnant throughout the shoot and thus unable to partake in some of the more demanding action scenes, much to her frustration.

Nineteen-year-old Sarah Brannens was chosen to portray Elbaz's fifteen-year-old daughter in the show. Her casting was heavily hyped in the media as Luc Besson's latest female revelation after Natalie Portman, Anne Parillaud, Milla Jovovich and Marion Cotillard. The relationship between Brannens' and Elbaz's characters in one of the core elements of the show. Coincidentally, Brannens was also cast in a role on the procedural Main Courante which premiered the day after No Limit on competing channel France 2.

Damien Jouillerot's character Tony Massart was originally scheduled to appear only in the first two episodes and die, but the actor impressed the producers so much they decided to write him into the subsequent episodes.

=== Season 1 ===
==== Filming ====
Shooting commenced on April 9, 2012, in Marseille at 3:30 AM and lasted four-and-a-half months until mid-August of that year. Filming was entirely conducted in the Marseille region, including the Mali-set opening scene of the first episode which was shot on the Vitrolles plateau. The first two episodes were shot in two weeks while the next four took twelve days. The six episodes were directed by veteran TV helmers Didier Le Pêcheur and Julien Despaux. Le Pêcheur directed the first two and final two episodes, while Despaux helmed the middle two and served as second unit director on the first two. Cinematography was handled by Ludovic Colbeau-Justin, who had previously collaborated with Le Pêcheur on the TV shows Les Bleus and La Commanderie. The production designer for the season was Jean-Jacques Gernolle, who had worked with EuropaCorp before on the first two Taxi films and Wasabi. The show's numerous stunts were handled by Alain Figlarz and his team, who had previously worked on projects such as The Bourne Identity, Taken 2, 36 Quai des Orfèvres and Brotherhood of the Wolf. Figlarz was additionally the second unit director for the last four episodes and Vincent Elbaz woke up each morning at 6 AM to train with him. According to Le Pêcheur, Luc Besson didn't involve himself much with the production, only sporadically giving his comments and approval during the shoot and post-production.

The series was mostly shot on location, with the notable exception of the Hydra headquarters, which were built in a studio and specifically designed for long steadicam shots. In addition, EuropaCorp obtained the collaboration of the French Armed Forces and was thus able to shoot in several military locations, including the interior of a frigate, which doubled as a submarine.

==== Post-production ====
The first two episodes were edited by Christine Lucas Navarro, who has worked on numerous EuropaCorp productions including Taken, the first two Transporter films and Angel-A, with Olivier Gourlay, as a co-editor on the first two episodes who worked on films such as Alexander, Gothika, Harry, He's Here to Help and Days of Glory. Yves Beloniak a frequent collaborator of director Didier Le Pêcheur and César-nominee for his work on La Vie en Rose edited the following two episodes while Christine Lucas Navarro was the sole editor on the last two.

Visual effects were handled by Thierry Delobel who had previously worked on projects such as Amélie, The Fall, A Very Long Engagement and Asterix & Obelix: Mission Cleopatra.

The show's score was composed by Erwann Kermorvant, best known for his collaborations with Olivier Marchal on 36 Quai des Orfèvres and Les Lyonnais as well as the scores for I Do and the TV series R.I.S, police scientifique.

Sound mixing was completed on October 20, 2012.

=== Season 2 ===
The second season was already being written prior to the first season's debut, with Vincent Elbaz unwilling to commit before reading the scripts and the writers aiming to delve more into the characters' past. It was officially greenlit along with the third season on November 29, 2012, will consist of eight episodes and will start shooting in spring 2013 for an expected fall 2013 broadcast.

== Reception ==
=== Critical response ===
The press screening for the first season occurred on October 24, 2012. Reception for the show has been generally positive, with many critics praising in particular Vincent Elbaz's performance but lamenting the uneven and unbelievable scripts.

Writing for the Belgian weekly Moustique, Geneviève de Wergifosse gave the show a mixed review, leaning towards the positive, and awarded a score of two stars out of four, criticizing the unbelievable plot but singling out the casting of Vincent Elbaz, Anne Girouard's performance, the cinematography and the "macho" directing. In L'Express, Sandra Benedetti also praised Elbaz and Girouard's acting as well as Damien Jouillerot's, noted Didier Le Pêcheur's "incredibly efficient" directing and singled out the fifth episode as the show's highlight. She however also criticized the plot as well as Julien Despaux's directing. Elbaz's acting and the directing were also praised by Corinne Calmet in Télé Z, who added that not a second of the show was boring. In Télé 7 Jours, Isabelle Magnier was also impressed by Elbaz and deemed that the show held its promises, though she also felt the plot required a strong suspension of disbelief while in Le Figaro, Nathalie Chuc opined that No Limit worked pretty well and was efficient, while comparing the directing favorably to 24.

One of the more negative reviews came from Adrien Maillard in Le Nouvel Observateur who felt the show was disappointing, the premise unoriginal, the action scenes dull and the dialogues flat.

=== Ratings ===
No Limit episode rankings in the Belgian television market
Episode	Timeslot	Rank	Share	Viewers
1	Monday 10:05 p.m.	#1	18%	217,130
2	Monday 11:15 p.m.	#1	20,5%	120,100
3	Monday 10:05 p.m.	#1	17,4%	197,700
4	Monday 11:15 p.m.	#1	23,4%	158,300
5	Monday 10:05 p.m.	#1	17,8%	214,700
6	Monday 11:15 p.m.	#1	24,8%	159,600
Season 1 Average			20,3%	177,922

No Limit episode rankings in the French television market
Episode	Timeslot	Rank	Share	Viewers
1	Thursday 8:50 p.m.	#1	27.5%	7,071,000
2	Thursday 10:00 p.m.	#1	33.2%	6,225,000
3	Thursday 8:50 p.m.	#1	26.1%	6,859,000
4	Thursday 10:00 p.m.	#1	29.2%	6,500,000
5	Thursday 8:50 p.m.	#1	25.7%	6,883,000
6	Thursday 10:00 p.m.	#1	27.7%	6,300,000
Season 1 Average			28.2%	6,639,667

Prior to the French broadcast, creator Luc Besson confessed being slightly afraid, rationalizing that "in a movie hall, the audience doesn't have a remote control to change the channel". However his fears proved to be unfounded as the show was a major success for TF1, who revealed that it had the highest rated premiere for a program on Thursday evenings since 2010.

== Broadcast history ==
No Limit premiered in Belgium on RTL-TVI on November 5, 2012, where it is scheduled to complete its run in three weeks at a pace of two episodes per night. In France, the crew premiered the show in Marseille, where the series is set, at the cinema "Les 3 Palmes" three days later on November 8. The star-studded Parisian premiere took place on November 13 at the cinema "UGC George V" on the Champs-Elysées and the show started broadcasting on November 15 for three weeks on TF1, at a pace of two episodes per night in prime time on Thursdays.

In Thailand first aired on digital television MONO29 on October 25, 2015.

In Australia, SBS broadcast series one and two, starting on 10 January 2015.

== See also ==
- List of French television series
