= Cyril Colbeau-Justin =

French film producer (1970–2020)

- Born: 28 September 1970; Paris, France
- Died: 7 November 2020 (aged 50)
- Occupation: Film producer

Cyril Colbeau-Justin (28 September 1970 – 7 November 2020) was a French film producer. He founded the enterprises KL Production and LGM Cinéma alongside Jean-Baptiste Dupont.

== Biography ==
In 1994, Colbeau-Justin founded LGM Cinéma alongside Dupont. In 2009, he took over Antoine de Caunes project he had started in 1999, a biographical film on Claude François. Colbeau-Justin appointed Florent Emilio Siri to direct the film, which was released in 2012 and titled My Way. In February 2014, he received two César Awards for Best Film and Best First Feature Film for Me, Myself and Mum.

Cyril Colbeau-Justin died on 7 November 2020 following a long battle with cancer, announced his long-time friend and actor Dominique Farrugia.

== Filmography ==
=== Executive producer ===
- Gregoire Moulin vs. Humanity (2001)
- Gangsters (2002)
- Mais qui a tué Pamela Rose ? (2003)
- La piste (2004)
- 36 Quai des Orfèvres (2004)
- Alive (2004)
- Un ticket pour l'espace (2006)
- Have Mercy on Us All (2007)
- Ce soir je dors chez toi (2007)
- The Last Deadly Mission (2008)
- Rivals (2008)
- Disco (2008)
- A French Gigolo (2008)
- RTT (2009)
- Bus Palladium (2010)
- Point Blank (2010)
- Le Fils à Jo (2011)
- Les Yeux de sa mère (2011)
- Blood from a Stone (2012)
- My Way (2012)
- Maman (2012)
- Boule & Bill (2013)
- Demi-sœur (2013)
- Le jour attendra (2013)
- Me, Myself and Mum (2013)
- Mea Culpa (2014)
- Situation amoureuse : C'est compliqué (2014)
- Amour sur place ou à emporter (2014)
- Les Gorilles (2015)
- Connasse, Princesse des cœurs (2015)
- Valley of Love (2015)
- French Cuisine (2015)
- Marseille (2016)
- Kalinka (2016)
- Vicky (2016)
- Le Correspondant (2016)
- Boule et Bill 2 (2017)
- Madame (2017)
- C'est tout pour moi (2017)
- Maryline (2017)
- Inséparables (2019)

=== Producer ===
==== Feature films ====
- A Gang Story (2011)
- Hollywoo (2011)
- Mea Culpa (2014)
- Rabin, the Last Day (2015)
- Down by Love (2016)
- Madame (2017)

==== Telefilms ====
- Mon père, Francis le Belge (2010)
- On se quitte plus (2012)
- Coup de foudre à Jaipur (2016)
- Coup de foudre à Noël (2017)

==== Television series ====
- Zak (2011)
- Léo Matteï, Brigade des mineurs (2013-2016)
- Les Chamois (2017)

=== Coproducer ===
- Pourquoi tu pleures ? (2011)
- Fiston (2014)
- The End (2016)
- Rolling to You (2018)

== Awards ==
- César Award for Best Film and César Award for Best First Feature Film for Me, Myself and Mum (2014)
