= Gang des postiches =

1981–1986 bank robbers in Paris

The Gang des postiches (French: Hairpiece Gang) was a team of bank robbers that operated in Paris between 1981 and 1986, robbing around thirty banks.

They would enter the bank dressed in common clothing and wearing false mustaches, beards, and wigs (from which they got their name). After entering the bank, they would separate into two groups, the first responsible for taking hostages, while the second went about acquiring cash and emptying safe deposit boxes (which were not under surveillance during opening hours).

It is estimated that the total value of their activities may have exceeded 30 million euro.

== Organisation ==
The gang was centered around individuals from Belleville, who had been friends and delinquents from a young age:

- Sidi Mohamed Badaoui, nicknamed Bada (who was killed before the group became active as "the gang"; it has been suggested that after this event the gang abhorred violence);
- Bruno Berliner, nicknamed Beau sourire (Nice smile);
- André Bellaïche, nicknamed Dédé;
- Patrick Geay, nicknamed Pougache;
- Robert Marguery, nicknamed Bichon;
- Jean-Claude Myszka.

It is known that the group consisted of a core group of five or six (to as high as maybe eight) members from eastern Paris, but there were other loose members as well. They convened to commit a series of hold-ups, even several on the same day, then separated for a while (Berliner, for example, lived in the countryside near Carrouges with his wife and son), sometimes going abroad, before they would reconvene. The team is considered one of the most prolific in France's history.

== Media involvement ==
Amidst the robberies, and in the absence of any leads for the investigators, journalists treated the robbers almost as heroes, since the gang was respectful to their hostages and did not hurt them. The robbers addressed the bank patrons and benefited from a strong sympathy among ordinary people, who smiled more than they were bothered when they heard that the Gang des postiches had struck again. There was even talk of the gang following a leftist guerilla ideology, which was clearly erroneous.

== Capture ==
The police and the government eventually lost patience with the ease with which the Gang des postiches operated and their mythification by the press. All available resources were deployed to combat them. The police developed an anti-wig device in Paris bank branches. This system was far from effective, but the gang felt the pressure rising around them. They became more cautious, more nervous, and less courteous with the hostages.

On 14 January 1986, one such device was triggered, summoning the BRB (Banditry Repression Brigade) and the BRI (Research and Intervention Brigade) to the branch of Crédit Lyonnais on 39, rue du Docteur-Blanche, in the 16th arrondissement. This time it was effective. Police discreetly surrounded the bank, knowing that the gang was inside, to stop them when they came out. Unfortunately when they came out the situation devolved into chaos, owing to the rash behavior of the head of the BRB, Raymond Mertz, who started a shootout in which Bruno Berliner and a police officer, Jean Vrindts, were killed. In addition, three more policemen were wounded. Marguery was arrested but some of the other robbers managed to escape. Patrick Geay was apprehended, but was released after another, unidentified, member of the gang took the policeman hostage (Geay then took another hostage). Geay and his companion took off in a police car with their hostages.

The fiasco revealed serious shortcomings of the police headquarters at 36 quai des Orfèvres, eventually leading to L'affaire Loiseau (itself leading to films (36 Quai des Orfèvres) and documentaries). See below.

While policemen pointed the finger at the BRB director for the fiasco, he was cleared. This situation led to protest and demonstration at 36 quai des Orfèvres in which it was demanded that Mertz be sacked. In response, the police authorities involved the IGS (in anglophone countries similar to internal affairs) to break up the protest. Later, Mertz (who had strong political support and connections) was even promoted to deputy director of the Paris police. Dominique Loiseau, a BRI officer, was accused of being a mole. Although he was tried and convicted, serious doubts remained, among some, about the facts. After almost seven years in prison, he was pardoned by François Mitterrand in 1993.

== Aftermath ==
On 31 January 1986, Serge Hernout, nicknamed Nounours, who was a suspected getaway driver for the gang, was arrested in his home at Bagnolet.

On 5 August 1986 Bellaïche and Geay were arrested in Italy. On 23 November 1986, Jean-Claude Myszka organised, together with François Besse (a notorious French jail breaker) the escape from prison of André Bellaïche and his cell mate Gian Luigi Esposito (with a stolen Red Cross helicopter). They returned to France in a stolen car.

Jean-Claude Myszka, André Bellaïche, and Patrick Geay were arrested together with Gian Luigi Esposito in December 1986, in a villa in Yerres after almost a year on the run. A large part of the last five robberies (consisting of cash, gold, jewels and precious stones) was recovered.

== Fate of the members or affiliates ==
- Sidi Mohamed Badaoui was killed on 28 October 1980.
- Bruno Berliner was killed in the 14 January 1986 robbery.
- André Bellaïche was released in 1997 and now runs three second hand record stores.
- Patrick Geay is still incarcerated. He denies his affiliation with the gang. On 31 October 2006, he was sentenced to 17 years imprisonment by the Essonne Court of Appeals, which found him guilty of five robberies and an accomplice in the attempted murder of a police officer.
- Robert Marguery, released in 1998, now lives in Thailand.
- Jean-Claude Myszka was released in 1990, was sentenced to prison again in 2001, before committing suicide in 2003.
- Serge Hernout was acquitted, a heroin addict, he was found dead in his home on 8 April 1987.

== The return of the Gang des postiches ==
In 2004, the case of the Gang des postiches resurfaced when serial killer Michel Fourniret admitted that he acquired his fortune from the Gang des postiches, when he recovered some of the gold which had been hidden in cemeteries. Fourniret was a former cellmate of Jean-Pierre Hellegouarch (believed to be a treasurer for the gang) whose partner, Farida Hammiche, helped Fourniret recover the gold in 1988. She was subsequently murdered by Fourniret.

== In popular culture ==
- Le Dernier Gang a movie by Ariel Zeitoun starring Vincent Elbaz, Gilles Lellouche, Sami Bouajila, Clémence Poésy, Pascal Elbé.
- The last raid inspired Olivier Marchal for his film 36 Quai des Orfèvres.

== See also ==
- La vérité si je mens. Patricia Tourancheau, Libération, 18 October 2007 (in French).
- Un flic innocent en prison, l'histoire vraie qui a inspiré le film 36, quai des orfèvres; Loiseau, Dominique and Michel Naudy; 303 pages; ISBN 978-2350850078 (in French)
- Ma vie sans postiche; André Bellaïche; Editions First; 2007; ISBN 2754004807 (in French).
