= Erwann Kermorvant =

French composer (born 1972)

Erwann Kermorvant (born July 28, 1972, in Lorient) is a French film composer known for his musical score contributions to cinema.

== Biography ==
Kermorvant gained popularity for his work on films such as "36 quai des Orfèvres," directed by Olivier Marchal in 2004, and "Les Lyonnais", released in 2011. Kermorvant also composed for the television series "Astrid et Raphaëlle". He was awarded the Grand Prix de la Musique pour l’Image in 2021, and Best Music award at the La Rochelle TV Fiction Festival in 2015 for Borderline, a French TV series.

== Filmography ==
- 2000 : Les vacances de Sam directed by Gilles Daubeuf
- 2002 : Duelles (TV) directed by Samantha Mazeras
- 2002 : Les frangines (TV) directed by Laurence Katrian
- 2003 : Mais qui a tué Pamela Rose ? directed by Éric Lartigau
- 2004 : Bien agités ! (TV) directed by Patrick Chesnais
- 2004 : A trois c'est mieux (TV) directed by Laurence Katrian
- 2004 : La Danse du vent directed by Taïeb Louhichi
- 2004 : 36 Quai des Orfèvres directed by Olivier Marchal
- 2005 : Un ticket pour l'espace directed by Éric Lartigau
- 2006 : Greco (TV) directed by Philippe Setbon
- 2006 : R.I.S Police scientifique (TV) directed by Stéphane Kaminka
- 2006 : Prête-moi ta main directed by Éric Lartigau
- 2007 : Big City directed by Djamel Bensalah
- 2008 : Un monde à nous directed by Frédéric Balekdjian
- 2009 : La Première Étoile directed by Lucien Jean-Baptiste
- 2009 : Braquo d'Olivier Marchal et Frédéric Schoendoerffer (TV series)
- 2009 : Les Toqués (TV) directed by Catherine Touzet et Ludovic Pion-Dumas
- 2011 : À la maison pour Noël (TV) directed by Christian Merret-Palmair
- 2011 : Les Lyonnais d'Olivier Marchal
- 2012 : Ma première fois directed by Marie-Castille Mention-Schaar
- 2012 : No limit (TV) directed by Didier Le Pêcheur et Julien Despaux
- 2012 : Bowling directed by Marie-Castille Mention-Schaar
- 2015 : Borderline directed by Olivier Marchal, téléfilm
- 2015 : L'Enquête directed by Vincent Garenq
- 2017 : Kim Kong directed by Simon Jablonka et Alexis Le Sec
- 2017 : Carbone directed by Olivier Marchal
- 2017 : La Deuxième Étoile directed by Lucien Jean-Baptiste
- 2019 : L'Enfant que je n'attendais pas directed by Bruno Garcia, TV movie
- 2019 : Astrid et Raphaëlle (TV)
- 2020 : Bronx directed by Olivier Marchal
- 2021 : Un homme d'honneur (TV)
- 2021 : Luther (TV)
- 2021 : La Dernière partie (TV)
- 2023 : L'Île prisonnière (TV)
