= 36th Precinct =

36th Precinct may refer to:

- 36th Precinct, a 2004 French film
- 36 Quai des Orfèvres, the headquarters of the Paris police
