= Vincent Moscato =

France international rugby union player

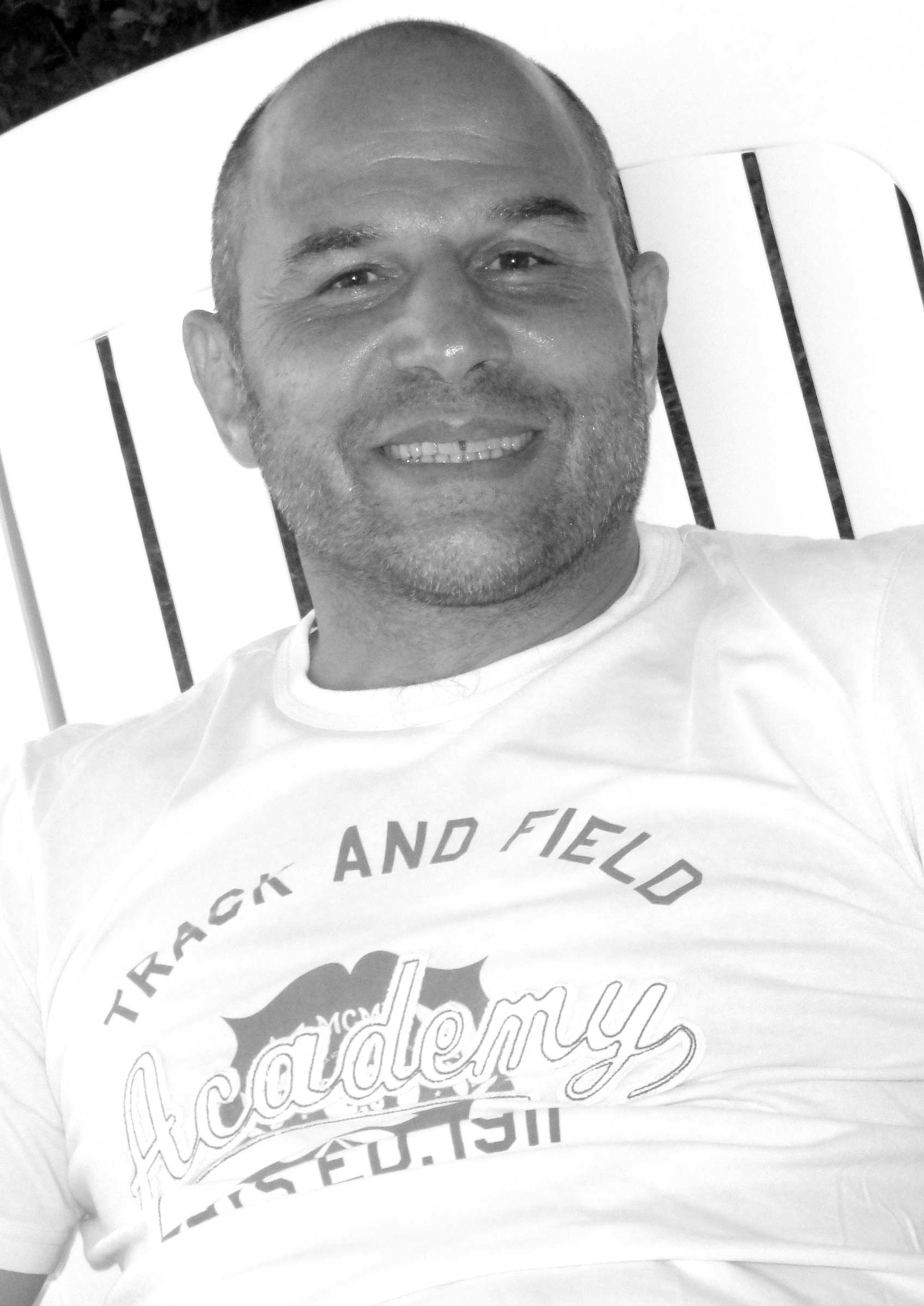
- Born: Thierry Vincent Moscato; 28 July 1965 (age 61) Paris, France
- Height: 1.79 m (5 ft 10 1/2 in)
- Weight: 98 kg (15 st 6 lb)

Rugby union career
- Position: Hooker
Amateur team(s)
Years	Team	Apps	(Points)
1983–1988	SC Graulhet		
1988–1993	Bègles		
1993–1995	Stade Bordelais		
Senior career
Years	Team	Apps	(Points)
1995–1996	Brive		
1996–1999	Stade Français		
International career
Years	Team	Apps	(Points)
1991–1992	France	4	(0)
Coaching career
- Years: Team
- 1999–2001: PUC
- 2001–2002: Racing Métro 92 Paris
- 2003–2004: PUC
- 2006: PUC

Thierry Vincent Moscato, known as Vincent Moscato (born 28 July 1965) is a former French rugby union player as well as radio talk host and actor.

Moscato played as a hooker. He won the French Top 14 title with CA Bordeaux-Bègles Gironde in 1991, and he earned his first international cap on 22 June 1991 against Romania at Bucharest. He was sent off during a match against England at Parc des Princes in 1992 and never played for France again.

== Honours ==
CA Bordeaux-Bègles Gironde

- French Rugby Union Championship:
  - Winner: 1991

Brive

- Challenge Yves du Manoir:
  - Winner: 1996

Stade Français

- French Rugby Union Championship:
  - Winner: 1998
- Coupe de France:
  - Winner: 1999

== Filmography ==
Year	Title	Role	Director	Notes
1993	Regarde-moi quand je te quitte	Rebecca's fiancé	Philippe de Broca	TV movie
2001	The Closet	Ponce	Francis Veber	
2001	Druids	Moscatos	Jacques Dorfmann	
2001	Voyance et manigance	Sahuc	Eric Fourniols	
2003	Ruby & Quentin	Raffi	Francis Veber	
2003	À la petite semaine	The henchman	Sam Karmann	
2003	Les gaous	Gerard	Igor Sekulic	
2003	Allez la Saussouze!	Vincent	Eric Fourniols & Vincent Manniez	TV series
2004	36 Quai des Orfèvres	Jenner	Olivier Marchal	
2004	Albert est méchant	The vigil	Hervé Palud	
2005	Malone	The cabaret owner	Franck Apprederis	TV series (1 episode)
2006	Un ticket pour l'espace	The vigil	Éric Lartigau	
2007	Le tuteur	Marcello	Jean Sagols	TV series (1 episode)
2008	Asterix at the Olympic Games	Goth	Frédéric Forestier & Thomas Langmann	
2010	Camping 2	Mario	Fabien Onteniente	
2010	Protéger & servir	Schmidt	Éric Lavaine	
2011	Le fils à Jo	Pompon	Philippe Guillard	
2012	Asterix and Obelix: God Save Britannia	Pilliébax	Laurent Tirard	
2013	Vive la France	Uncle Momo	Michaël Youn	
2015	On voulait tout casser	Tony	Philippe Guillard	
2016	Léo Mattéï, Brigade des Mineurs	Éric Guillard	Sébastien Cirade	TV series (1 episode)

== Theater ==
Year	Title	Author	Director	Notes
1999	Un poulet dans la mêlée			Théâtre Montmartre-Galabru
2008	Oscar	Claude Magnier	Philippe Hersen	Théâtre du Gymnase Marie Bell
2009	Le Siècle sera Féminin ou ne sera pas	Dominique Coubes & Nathalie Vierne	Dominique Coubes & Nathalie Vierne	Théâtre du Gymnase Marie Bell
2010–2013	Moscato one man chaud	Éric Carrière, Vincent & Krystel Moscato	Éric Carrière	Tour
2014–2018	Moscato au galop	Frédéric Pouhier, Vincent & Krystel Moscato	Krystel Moscato	Tour

== Radio ==
Since 2007, He is a sport radio talk host with RMC, his daily show is called "Super Moscato Show".
