= The Players (2012 film) =

2012 anthology film

- Theatrical release poster
- French: Les Infidèles
- Directed by: Emmanuelle Bercot; Fred Cavayé; Alexandre Courtès; Michel Hazanavicius; Éric Lartigau; Jean Dujardin; Gilles Lellouche; Jan Kounen (Note: Jan Kounen's segment "Ultimate Fucking" was cut from the theatrical release of the film; it is available in the extended version on home video.)
- Written by: Jean Dujardin; Gilles Lellouche; Stéphane Joly; Philippe Caverivière; Nicolas Bedos
- Produced by: Jean Dujardin; Marc Dujardin; Éric Hannezo; Guillaume Lacroix
- Starring: Jean Dujardin; Gilles Lellouche; Guillaume Canet; Sandrine Kiberlain; Alexandra Lamy; Mathilda May; Géraldine Nakache; Isabelle Nanty; Manu Payet; Clara Ponsot
- Cinematography: Guillaume Schiffman
- Edited by: Anny Danché
- Music by: Evgueni Galperine; Sacha Galperine
- Production companies: JD Prod; Black Dynamite Films; Mars Films; M6 Films; Cool Industrie
- Distributed by: Mars Distribution
- Release date: 29 February 2012 (France)
- Running time: 109 minutes
- Country: France
- Language: French
- Budget: $13.8 million
- Box office: $24.6 million

The Players (French: Les Infidèles, lit. 'The Unfaithful Ones') is a 2012 French sex comedy anthology film starring Jean Dujardin and Gilles Lellouche, with each of them also directing and writing a segment.

== Plot ==
Series of vignettes about the theme of male infidelity and its adulterous variants.

== Cast ==
- Jean Dujardin as Fred / Olivier / François / Laurent / James
- Gilles Lellouche as Greg / Nicolas / Bernard / Antoine / Eric
- Lionel Abelanski as the director
- Guillaume Canet as Thibault
- Charles Gérard as Richard
- Sandrine Kiberlain as Marie-Christine
- Dolly Golden as the mistress
- Éric de Montalier as the emergency doctor
- Katia Lewkowicz as Maxime's mother
- Alexandra Lamy as Lisa
- Éric Massot as the waiter
- Mathilda May as Ariane
- Géraldine Nakache as Stéphanie
- Isabelle Nanty as Christine
- Maëva Pasquali as Nathalie
- Manu Payet as Simon
- Clara Ponsot as Inès
- Hélène Seuzaret as Isabelle, Éric's wife
- Anthony Sonigo as Benjamin
- Anne Suarez as Julie
- Bastien Bouillon as Valentin

== Controversy ==
The promotional posters for the film, on which Jean Dujardin and Gilles Lellouche are seen in suggestive positions (like gripping a pair of naked female legs), attracted accusations of sexism. The French professional authority of regulation for advertising received four official complaints accusing the posters of sexism. Following this controversy, the posters were taken down, and the distributor apologized.

Dujardin refers to I mostri by Dino Risi.

The original cut of the film included a scene where a man talks to a woman while a plane crashes into the World Trade Center. Reportedly, this scene has been censored to have better chances to get an Academy Award for Dujardin (who went on to win the Best Actor award for his leading role in The Artist).

== Remake ==
An Italian remake of the same name was released in 2020.
