= Clara Ponsot =

French actress (born 1989)

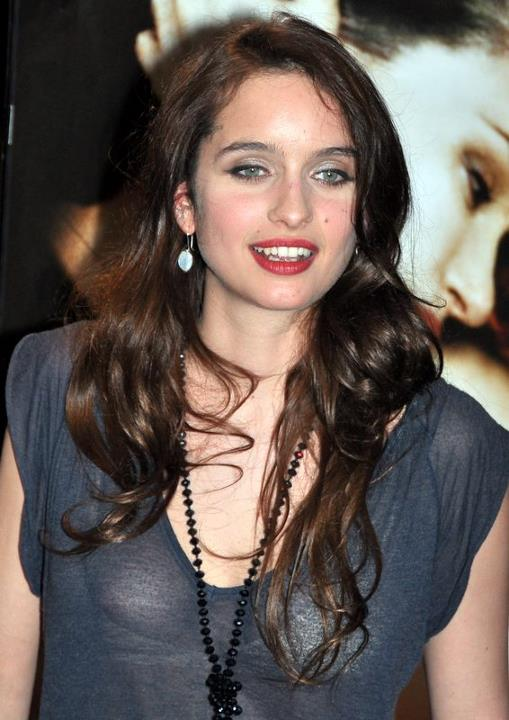
- Ponsot in 2012
- Born: 25 January 1989 (age 37); France
- Education: CNSAD
- Occupation: Actress
- Years active: 2006-present

Clara Ponsot (born 25 January 1989) is a French actress. She has appeared in more than twenty films since 2006.

== Biography ==
Clara was born in 1989 in France. She speaks French, Italian, Spanish and English. She wanted to be an actress starting when she was eight years old.

== Theater ==
Year	Title	Author	Director
2006	The Misanthrope	Molière	David Géry
2009–10	Ma vie de chandelle	Fabrice Melquiot	Fabrice Melquiot
2012	Faites avancer l'espèce	W. H. Auden & William Shakespeare	Bruno Bayen
2013	Fahrenheit 451	Ray Bradbury	David Géry
2014	4.48 Psychosis	Sarah Kane	Matthieu Dessertine
2014–16	The Game of Love and Chance	Pierre de Marivaux	Laurent Laffargue
2015	The Maids	Jean Genet	Sophie Pincemaille
2015	The Taming of the Shrew	William Shakespeare	Mélanie Leray
2015–16	Et ma cendre sera plus chaude que leur vie	Marina Tsvetaeva	Marie Montegani
2019	Souviens toi des larmes de Colchide	Aurore Jacob	Anne-Laure Thumerel
2019	Et ma cendre sera plus chaude que leur vie	Marina Tsvetaeva	Marie Montegani

== Filmography ==
Year	Title	Role	Director	Notes
2006	Avocats & associés	Charlotte Henri-Biabaud	Denis Malleval	TV series (1 episode)
2006	Commissaire Moulin	Nathalie Mericourt	José Pinheiro	TV series (1 episode)
2006	Madame la proviseur	Manon Menager-Joncourt	Philippe Bérenger	TV series (2 episodes)
2008	La Possibilité d'une île	Dacha	Michel Houellebecq	
2008	Le silence de l'épervier	Elsa Vivier	Dominique Ladoge	TV mini-series
2009	La grande vie	The hottie #1	Emmanuel Salinger	
2009	Josephine, Guardian Angel	Laura	Philippe Monnier	TV series (1 episode)
2010	Accomplices	Lola	Frédéric Mermoud	
2010	Bus Palladium	Nathalie	Christopher Thompson	
2010	Panique!	Garance	Benoît d'Aubert	TV movie
2010	Rose, c'est Paris	The siren	Serge Bramly	TV movie
2010	Les Bleus	Agathe Sirac	Olivier Barma	TV series (1 episode)
2010–13	Les Dames	Isabelle	Charlotte Brändström, Philippe Venault, ...	TV series (5 episodes)
2011	Nobody Else but You	Betty	Gérald Hustache-Mathieu	
2012	The Players	Inès	Éric Lartigau	
2012	Cosimo e Nicole	Nicole	Francesco Amato	
2012	Bye Bye Blondie	Young Frances	Virginie Despentes	
2012	Paradis : Hémisphère	The woman	Sacha Barbin	Music video
2013	Des gens qui s'embrassent	Melita Melkowich	Danièle Thompson	
2014	Simiocratie	Charlotte d'Arouet	Nicolas Pleskof	Short
2016	Parisienne	Antonia	Danielle Arbid	
2018	Du soleil dans mes yeux	Irène	Nicolas Giraud	
2018	Purina No1	The scientist	Maxence Stamatiadis	Short
2018	Das Boot	Nathalie	Andreas Prochaska	TV series (4 episodes)
2019	An Almost Ordinary Summer	Olivia	Simone Godano	
2019	La bataille du rail	Nina	Jean-Charles Paugam	
2019	Place des victoires	The neighbor	Yoann Guillouzouic	
2019	Ma mère, le crabe et moi	Jenny	Yann Samuell	TV movie
2020	Les prémices	Fanny	Germain Le Carpentier	Short
2020	Des gens bien	Manon	Maxime Roy	Short
2021	Les héroïques	Lili	Maxime Roy	
2022	L'immensità	Camilla	Emanuele Crialese	
2023	Esperando a Dalí	Lola	David Pujol	
2023	Like Sheep Among Wolves	Camilla	Lyda Patitucci	
2023	Polar Park	Christina	Gérald Hustache-Mathieu	TV series (2 episodes)
2025	The Illusion	Rose	Roberto Andò	
TBA	W Muozzart!	Justine	Sebastiano Rizzo	Filming
