= Michu (disambiguation) =

Michu (born 1986) is a Spanish former footballer.

Michu may also refer to:

- Clément Michu (1936–2016), French actor
- Michu Meszaros (1939–2016), Hungarian-born actor
- Michu of Silla, the thirteenth ruler of the Korean state of Silla
