= Braquo =

French crime drama television series

- Created by: Olivier Marchal
- Written by: Olivier Marchal; Abdel Raouf Dafri; Philippe Haïm; Eric Valette; Frank Henry; Yann Le Nivet; David Defendi; Edgar Marie; Hervé Albertazzi; Arnaud Tourangin
- Directed by: Olivier Marchal; Frédéric Schoendoerffer; Philippe Haïm; Frédéric Jardin; Eric Valette; Manuel Boursinhac; Xavier Palud
- Starring: Jean-Hugues Anglade; Joseph Malerba; Karole Rocher; Nicolas Duvauchelle
- Composer: Erwann Kermorvant
- Country of origin: France
- Original language: French
- No. of seasons: 4
- No. of episodes: 32

Production
- Producers: Hervé Chabalier; Claude Chelli
- Production location: Hauts-de-Seine
- Cinematography: Denis Rouden; Jean-Pierre Sauvaire; Laurent Barès; Vincent Muller
- Running time: 52 minutes
- Production company: Capa Drama

Original release
- Network: Canal+
- Release: 12 October 2009 – 3 October 2016

Braquo is a French crime drama television series created by Olivier Marchal. It was produced by Capa Drama with the participation of Canal+ in association with Marathon Group, Be-Films and RTBF. Braquo was first broadcast in France from 12 October to 2 November 2009.

The first season of Braquo established a record audience for an original production of the channel and surpassed that of many U.S. productions broadcast by the network. The second season started on Canal+ on 21 November 2011. A third and apparently final season was announced by lead actor Jean-Hugues Anglade in 2011. The ending of the third season, with two plot strands left unfinished, suggested a possible return. The series was available in the US from Hulu as of September 2013.

The fourth and final season of Braquo was shot from February to June 2015 in Marseille and Paris. It is directed by Xavier Palud and Frédéric Jardin and written by Abdel Raouf Dafri. It screened in France in September 2016, closely followed by a Spanish broadcast and began airing in the UK in November on FOX UK.

The name of the series comes from the French word braquage, meaning armed robberies, particularly of banks.

== Plot ==
The protagonists are four police agents in the Hauts-de-Seine area of Paris: Eddy Caplan, Walter Morlighem, Théo Vachewski and Roxanne Delgado. Their colleague Max Rossi is accused of criminal misconduct, and commits suicide. His guilt is then presumed, disrupting the lives of the other four.

The four police agents then decide to "cross the yellow line" and do whatever is necessary, even breaking the law, to clear Rossi's name. In crossing the yellow line, however, they fall under the close scrutiny of Vogel, of the police internal affairs bureau, a sworn enemy of Caplan.

== Cast ==
The main cast of Braquo is made up of the following:

- Jean-Hugues Anglade as Eddy Caplan (Series 1-4)
- Joseph Malerba as Walter Morlighem (Series 1-4)
- Karole Rocher as Roxane Delgado (Series 1-4)
- Nicolas Duvauchelle as Théo Vachewski (Series 1-2, recurring role in series 3)
- Geoffroy Thiébaut as Roland Vogel (Recurring role throughout series 1-4)
- Olivier Rabourdin as Max Rossi

== Episodes ==
Series	Episodes	Premier	Finale
1	8	12 October 2009	2 November 2009
2	8	21 November 2011	12 December 2011
3	8	10 February 2014	3 March 2014
4	8	12 September 2016	3 October 2016

== See also ==
- List of French television series
