= Katia Lewkowicz =

Katia Lewkowicz (born 26 March 1973) is a French-Israeli actress and director. She is a member of the 50/50 collective, which aims to promote gender equality and diversity in film and audiovisual media.

== Filmography ==
=== Actress ===
==== Cinema ====
- 1999: Du bleu jusqu'en Amérique de Sarah Lévy : Voiture Voiture
- 2000: Mortels de Samuel Jouy (court-métrage) : Dounia
- 2001: Jeu de cons de Jean-Michel Verner : Louisa
- 2002: Vivante de Sandrine Ray
- 2005: Ma vie en l'air de Rémi Bezançon : Sandrine
- 2005: La Maison de Nina de Richard Dembo : Eva
- 2006: On va s'aimer d'Ivan Calbérac : Sophie
- 2006: Prête-moi ta main d'Éric Lartigau : Carole
- 2006: Madame Irma de Didier Bourdon et Yves Fajnberg : Madame Dupontavice
- 2006: Le Serpent d'Éric Barbier : Maître Leroy
- 2008: Secret défense de Philippe Haïm : Aline
- 2009: Comme le temps passe de Cathy Verney (court métrage) : Carole
- 2010: Le Siffleur de Philippe Lefebvre : l'avocate d'Armand
- 2011: La guerre est déclarée de Valérie Donzelli : Jeanne
- 2012: Les Infidèles, segment Lolita d'Éric Lartigau : la mère de Maxime
- 2012: Main dans la main de Valérie Donzelli : Katia

==== Television ====
- 2008 : Revivre (mini-série) de Haim Bouzaglo : Angèle Meyer
- 2008-2011 : Hard (série télévisée) de Cathy Verney : Lucile

=== Director ===
==== Cinema ====
- 2008: C'est pour quand ? (court métrage)
- 2011: Pourquoi tu pleures ?
- 2014: Tiens-toi droite
- 2020: Forte

==== Publications ====
- 2017 : L'Amour l'amour (court-métrage / publicité Intermarché, groupe Les Mousquetaires) with Ava Baya et Thomas Silberstein
- 2017 : J’ai tant rêvé (court-métrage / publicité Intermarché, groupe Les Mousquetaires)
- 2019 : C’est magnifique (court-métrage / publicité Intermarché, groupe Les Mousquetaires)
- 2020 : L'Amour tout court with Ava Baya and Thomas Silberstein (la suite de L'Amour, l'amour), Je désire être avec vous, Jusqu'à mon dernier souffle (courts-métrages / publicité Intermarché, groupe Les Mousquetaires)
- 2021 : Un endroit pour vivre, Papa (courts-métrages / publicité Intermarché, groupe Les Mousquetaires)
- 2022 : Magicien, La petite souris, Altitude, Aspirateur (courts-métrages / publicité Intermarché, groupe Les Mousquetaires)
- 2023 : La Vie ne devrait pas coûter aussi cher x 4, Ça s'éclaircit devant, Fruit, Merlu, Steak haché (courts-métrages / publicité Intermarché, groupe Les Mousquetaires)
