= Nina's House =

2005 film by Richard Dembo

- Film poster
- Directed by: Richard Dembo
- Written by: Richard Dembo
- Produced by: Alain Rozanès; Pascal Verroust
- Starring: Agnès Jaoui; Sarah Adler
- Cinematography: Laurent Fleutot
- Music by: Teddy Lasry
- Release date: 12 October 2005
- Running time: 1h 52min
- Country: France
- Language: French

Nina's House (French: La Maison de Nina) is a 2005 French war film directed by Richard Dembo.

== Plot ==
In the final months of the Holocaust, Nina struggles to integrate 25 children liberated from Nazi concentration camps with the other orphans in her care in the east of France.

== Cast ==
- Agnès Jaoui as Nina
- Sarah Adler as Marlène
- Katia Lewkowicz as Eva
- Arié Elmaleh as Avner
- Sébastien Knafo as Arié
- Adèle Csech as Sylvie
- Jérémy Sitbon as Georges
- Vincent Rottiers as Gabriel
- Bernard Blancan as Emile
- Gaspard Ulliel as Izik
