= Palais Royal! =

2005 film by Valérie Lemercier

- Directed by: Valérie Lemercier
- Written by: Brigitte Buc; Valérie Lemercier
- Produced by: Edouard Weil
- Starring: Valérie Lemercier; Lambert Wilson; Catherine Deneuve
- Cinematography: James Welland
- Edited by: Luc Barnier
- Music by: Bertrand Burgalat
- Production companies: Rectangle Productions; Gaumont; TF1 Films Production; Les Films du Dauphin; Palais Productions Ltd.; De L'Huile
- Distributed by: Gaumont Columbia TriStar Films
- Release date: 23 November 2005
- Running time: 110 minutes
- Country: France
- Language: French
- Budget: $15.4 million
- Box office: $17.6 million

Palais Royal! is a 2005 French comedy film, co-written, directed by and starring Valérie Lemercier.

== Cast ==
- Valérie Lemercier as Princess Armelle
- Lambert Wilson as Prince Arnaud
- Catherine Deneuve as Eugénia
- Michel Aumont as René-Guy
- Mathilde Seigner as Laurence
- Denis Podalydès as Titi
- Michel Vuillermoz as Prince Alban
- Gisèle Casadesus as Queen Alma
- Gilbert Melki as Bruno
- Maurane as Herself
- Véronique Barrault as Frédérique Dianausoa
- Etienne Chicot as The photographer
- Pierre Vernier as The ambassador
- Franck de Lapersonne as The minister
- Fanny Florido as Élodie
- Jacqueline Vandevelde as Bricka
- Manon Chevallier as Princess Louise
- Pauline Serieys as Princess Constance
- Vincent Grass as Monsieur Lamache
- Hubert Saint-Macary as The director of the retirement home
- Noël Godin as The pie thrower
- Catherine Hosmalin as The Open day's lady
- Jonathan Lambert as The nurse
- Soko as The hairdresser

== Production ==
Filming locations included London, Uccle, Mechelen, the Château de Compiègne in Oise, and Paris.

== Accolades ==
Year	Ceremony	Category	Recipient(s)	Result
2006	César Awards	Best Actress	Valérie Lemercier	Nominated
2006	César Awards	Best Supporting Actress	Catherine Deneuve	Nominated
