= Clément Michu =

- Born: 27 November 1936; Villeurbanne, Auvergne-Rhône-Alpes, France
- Died: 21 October 2016 (aged 79); Nogent-sur-Marne, Val-de-Marne, France
- Occupation: Actor

Clément Michu (1936–2016) was a French film and television actor.

== Early life ==
Clément Michu was born on 27 November 1936 in Villeurbanne in the Metropolis of Lyon.

== Career ==
Michu acted in many films, four of which were directed by Gérard Oury. He acted also on Thierry la Fronde, a television programme, from 1963 to 1966. His best-known role was as Inspector Guyomard on Commissaire Moulin, a series on TF1, from 1980 to 2008.

== Personal life and death ==
Michu resided in Nogent-sur-Marne near Paris, where he died on 21 October 2016. He was 79 years old.

== Filmography ==
Year	Title	Role	Director	Notes
1962	Un clair de lune à Maubeuge	Promoter	Jean Chérasse	
1963	Le temps des copains		Robert Guez	
1965	The Double Bed		Jean Delannoy	(segment 3 "La répétition")
1966	Le Caïd de Champignol	Berluron	Jean Bastia	
1966	La Grande Vadrouille	Train station employee	Gérard Oury	Uncredited
1967	Le Grand Bidule	Agent Baudry	Raoul André	
1968	À tout casser	Gus	John Berry	
1970	Les Novices	Customer	Guy Casaril	
1971	Delusions of Grandeur		Gérard Oury	
1971	The Legend of Frenchie King	Charvet	Christian-Jaque	
1972	Le Rempart des béguines	Howard	Guy Casaril	
1973	A Slightly Pregnant Man		Jacques Demy	
1973	The Mad Adventures of Rabbi Jacob	Policeman	Gérard Oury	Uncredited
1976	Le Trouble-fesses	L'agent de police	Raoul Foulon	
1978	La Carapate	Policeman	Gérard Oury	Uncredited
1979	Il y a longtemps que je t'aime	Le liftier	Jean-Charles Tacchella	
1979	La Gueule de l'autre	Boireau	Pierre Tchernia	
2008	The Last Deadly Mission	Émile Maxence	Olivier Marchal	(final film role)
