= Véronique Barrault =

French actress (1958–2022)

- Born: 1958
- Died: 3 May 2022 (aged 64); Gironde, France
- Education: Atelier international de Théâtre Blanche Salant
- Occupation: Actress

Véronique Barrault (1958 – 3 May 2022) was a French actress.

== Biography ==
Barrault studied at the Atelier international de Théâtre Blanche Salant and was known for her early successes in the theatre. She performed at Le Splendid and the Café de la Gare under the pseudonym "Coquillette". She first appeared on film in French Fried Vacation 2, directed by Patrice Leconte. She acted alongside the likes of Josiane Balasko, Alain Chabat, and Charlotte Gainsbourg. In 2002, she held the leading role in the play Un vrai bonheur, written by Didier Caron. She spent her final years in the theatre and working as an acting coach.

Barrault was killed in a traffic collision in Gironde on 3 May 2022, at the age of 64.

== Filmography ==
=== Cinema ===
- French Fried Vacation 2 (1979)
- Le Quart d'heure américain (1982)
- Marche à l'ombre (1984)
- Blanche et Marie (1985)
- Le Mariage du siècle (1985)
- My True Love, My Wound (1987)
- Lady Cops (1987)
- Love and Fear (1988)
- My Life Is Hell (1991)
- French Twist (1995)
- 7 Years of Marriage (2003)
- Un vrai bonheur, le film (2005)
- Palais royal! (2005)
- Hell (2005)
- Un ticket pour l'espace (2006)
- I Do (2006)
- La Vie d'artiste (2007)
- A French Gigolo (2008)
- Bank Error in Your Favour (2009)
- Les Hommes à lunettes (2012)
- Queens of the Ring (2013)
- Joséphine, Pregnant & Fabulous (2016)

=== Television ===
- Guignol, le retour (1981)
- Hôtel de police (1984)
- La bague au doigt (1986)
- Les Nuls, l'émission (1992)
- Maigret (1992)
- Mistinguett, une histoire d'amour (1993)
- Julie Lescaut (1995)
- Affaires familiales (2000)
- Spiral (2005)
- Psycho-Fiction - L'estime de soi (2006)
- Julie Lescaut (2010)
- Section de recherches (2017)
- The Inside Game (2018–2019)
- Le Squat (2021)
