= La Vie d'artiste (film) =

- Directed by: Marc Fitoussi
- Written by: Marc Fitoussi
- Produced by: Simon Arnal, Caroline Benjo, Barbara Letellier, Carole Scotta
- Starring: Sandrine Kiberlain; Émilie Dequenne; Denis Podalydès; Valérie Benguigui; Marilyne Canto
- Cinematography: Pénélope Pourriat
- Edited by: Serge Turquier
- Music by: Tim Gane, Sean O'Hagan
- Production companies: Haut et Court, France 2 Cinéma
- Distributed by: Haut et Court
- Release date: 5 September 2007
- Running time: 107 min
- Country: France
- Language: French

La Vie d'artiste is a French film written and directed in 2006 by Marc Fitoussi, realised in 2007.

== Plot ==
Alice dreams of being a film or stage actress, but is now reduced to dubbing the voice of Yoko Johnson, a Japanese cartoon detective character. Bertrand is writing his second novel and aspires to literary greatness. Meanwhile, he teaches French in a secondary school. Cora hopes to break into the French songwriting world, but has to work as hostess in a karaoke bar. All three are determined to achieve their goals and it is too bad if the paths to glory are strewn with pitfalls.

== Cast ==
- Sandrine Kiberlain : Alice, actress reduced to dubbing manga
- Émilie Dequenne : Cora, aspiring singer reduced to odd jobs
- Denis Podalydès : Bertrand, French teacher and unsuccessful writer
- Valérie Benguigui : Solange, Betrand's partner, maths teacher colleague
- Marilyne Canto : Alice's sister
- Camille Japy : Annabella, actress friend of Alice, successful in theatre
- Grégoire Leprince-Ringuet :Frédéric, Bertrand's wise pupil
- Magali Woch : Manu, Cora's best friend
- Claire Maurier : Alice's agent, in whom she has no faith
- Aure Atika : manager of the Hippopotamus restaurant who employs Cora
- Jean-Pierre Kalfon : Joseph Costals, singer-songwriter admired by Cora
- Maria Schneider : wife of Joseph Costals
- Jean-Marie Winling : Bertrand's editor
- Éric Savin : Michel, who dubs the manga with Alice
- Stéphane Guillon : Michel's replacement, very talkative
- Solenn Jarniou : Bénédicte, who supervises the manga dubbing
- Francis Leplay : Alice's brother-in-law
- Thibault Vinçon : Cora's neighbour
- Lolita Chammah : Caroline
- Chantal Banlier : Annick
- Anne Bouvier : the bookseller
- Catherine Davenier : Mme director
- Titouan Laporte : Sacha, Alice' nephew
- Thomas Derichebourg : partner of Annabella
- Monique Couturier : the woman in the dressing room
- Olivier Claverie : casting director
- Véronique Barrault : casting director
- Éric Elmosnino : Alice's ex

== Awards ==
- Deauville American Film Festival 2007 - Prix Michel d’Ornano
