= The Beginner =

- Directed by: Guy Casaril
- Written by: Guy Casaril; Paul Gégauff
- Starring: Brigitte Bardot; Annie Girardot
- Cinematography: Claude Lecomte
- Music by: François de Roubaix
- Release date: 1970
- Country: France
- Language: French
- Box office: 1,813,091 admissions (France)

The Beginner (French: Les Novices) is a 1970 French film starring Brigitte Bardot.

== Plot ==
Agnes the nun and her fellow nunnery go for a beach day where she finds mod garments and a motorbike that she rides off on an adventure.

== Cast ==
- Brigitte Bardot as Agnès
- Annie Girardot as Mona Lisa
- Jean Carmet as le client au chien
- Noël Roquevert as le sadique
- Jacques Jouanneau as le client de Mona Lisa
- Jess Hahn as l'Américain
- Clément Michu as le client en double file
- Jacques Duby as le chauffeur de l'ambulance
- Antonio Passalia as le play-boy
- Dominique Zardi as l'agent du commissariat
