= Francis Imbard affair =

Unsolved murder of a French businessman

The Francis Imbard case
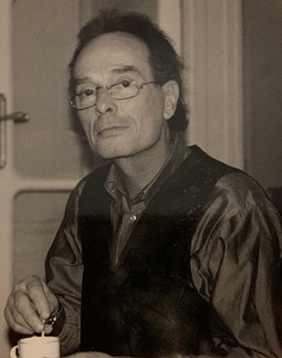
- Francis Imbard en 2001.
- Location: France; Paris, 16th arrondissement of Paris
- Date: February 26, 2003
- Attack type: Homicide
- Weapons: Firearm, specifically a Pistol
- Deaths: 1
- Victim: Francis Imbard
- Accused: Murder
- Verdict: Unsolved case

The Francis Imbard case is a criminal case that began in Paris, France, on February 26, 2003. On that day, 58-year-old Francis Imbard was shot in the head as he left his home. The 36, quai des Orfèvres crime squad opened a police investigation the same day. The police investigated the circumstances surrounding the homicide.

Francis Imbard, born in 1944 in the Gard region of France, was a nightclub manager in Paris. Once a teacher, he quickly became a businessman, buying up a number of ailing companies at low cost, then making them profitable before selling them on. In the late 1990s, he created Brasil Tropical, a dinner show, and L'Enfer (later renamed Le Red Light), a nightclub. His establishments were very popular in the early 2000s, and became landmarks in the Parisian "night world".

The investigators examined several leads: a crime of passion, a murder committed by a debtor, or a settling of scores, the most likely, but no suspect was identified, leaving the case unsolved. Throughout the investigation, several investigating judges came and went. In 2008, the case was dismissed, before finally being reopened. In 2014, an individual was indicted for complicity and participation in the murder, but this indictment was quashed on procedural grounds. In 2022, two individuals were indicted, one for masterminding the crime, the other for facilitating it.

== Context ==
=== The Imbard family ===
Francis Imbard was born on July 16, 1944 in Laudun, Gard. He grew up in Marseille, in a family of industrialists, surrounded by three sisters, and went on to complete a long course of studies, graduating with an agrégation in mathematics. At the University of Aix, he met Dominique, whom he married shortly afterwards. (Note: Willemin 2014, chapter 14)

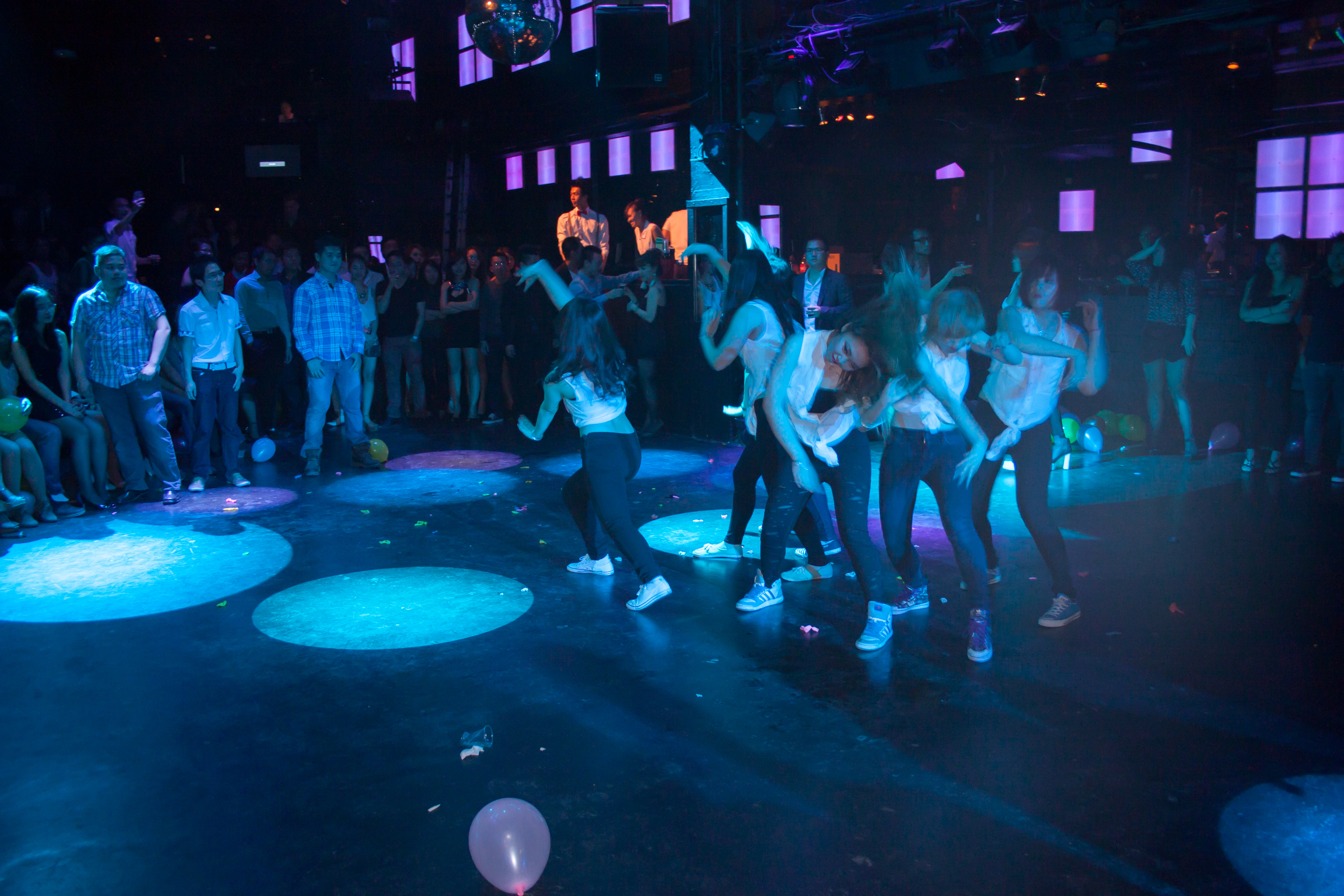
People dancing in the Brasil Tropical in 2013, the establishment created by Francis Imbard seventeen years earlier.

Francis Imbard left his teaching career to become a salesman for an American microfilm company, where he met and befriended Yves Bidot, a salesman at Renault. The two men decided to leave their respective companies, join forces and go into business for themselves. They bought up a number of ailing companies at low prices, then restored them to good condition before selling them on. Between 1980 and 1990, the two men owned around twenty companies, with assets estimated at between 400 and 450 million francs at the time.

In 1987, they bought Telematics France, a Toulouse-based company specializing in minitel and publishing several 3615 gay services. One of their biggest customers was David Girard, a leader in the gay community. When he died in 1990, Francis Imbard bought the company from his heirs, then sold it a few years later for a large capital gain. He became a very wealthy man.

In 1996, Francis Imbard renovated the former squash courts under the slab of the Montparnasse Tower, and opened the Brasil Tropical, a 550-cover dinner and show. Some time later, he created a nightclub, which he named L'Enfer (later renamed the Red Light). Both of these establishments did very well, and became landmarks in the Parisian nightlife scene in the early 2000s.

== The news ==
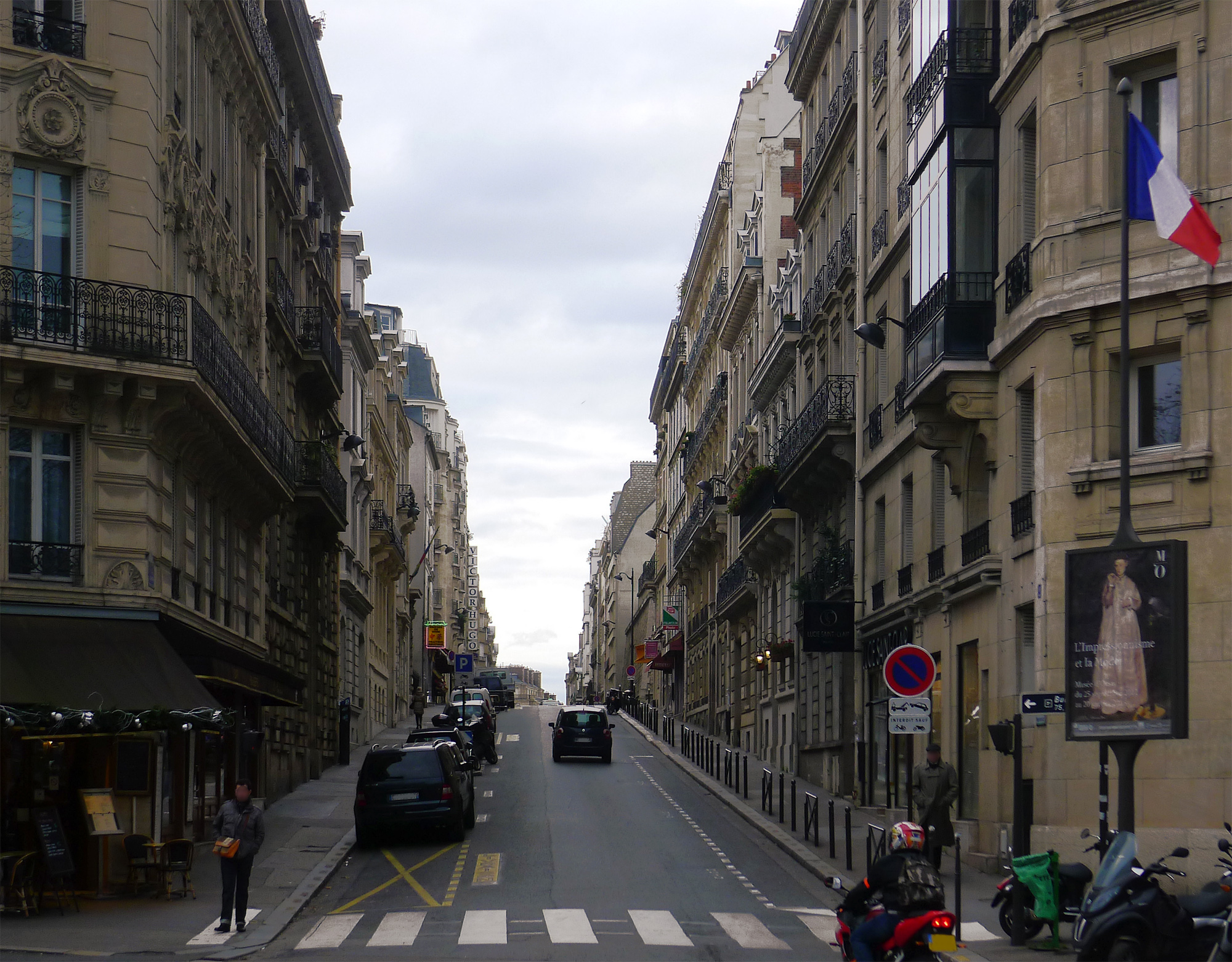
General view of rue Copernic in Paris (16th arrondissement), Francis Imbard's home at no. 50.

Francis Imbard lived in a large apartment, occupying the entire 5th and top floor of a building at number 50, rue Copernic, in the 16th arrondissement of Paris.

On Wednesday February 26, 2003, at around 10 am, the apartment's cleaning lady, Malika, climbed the back staircase and began her day's work in the kitchen, where she found Francis Imbard's daughter Julie.

At around 10:45 am, Francis Imbard said goodbye to his daughter, then left the apartment. A few seconds later, Malika and Julie hear a thud. Julie rushed to the landing to find her father lying on the floor. She tried to stop the bleeding and asked Malika to call the fire department. When they arrived, Julie told them that her father had been shot in the head, and they began cardiopulmonary resuscitation. Lionel, the victim's son, was alerted by telephone and arrived at the scene. (Note: Poivre d'Arvor & Bloch 2011, 7:051.)

Resuscitation was finally stopped, and Francis Imbard, aged 58, was pronounced dead at 11:25 am.

== Investigation ==
The Paris criminal brigade at 36, Quai des Orfèvres was assigned to the investigation.

=== Initial findings ===
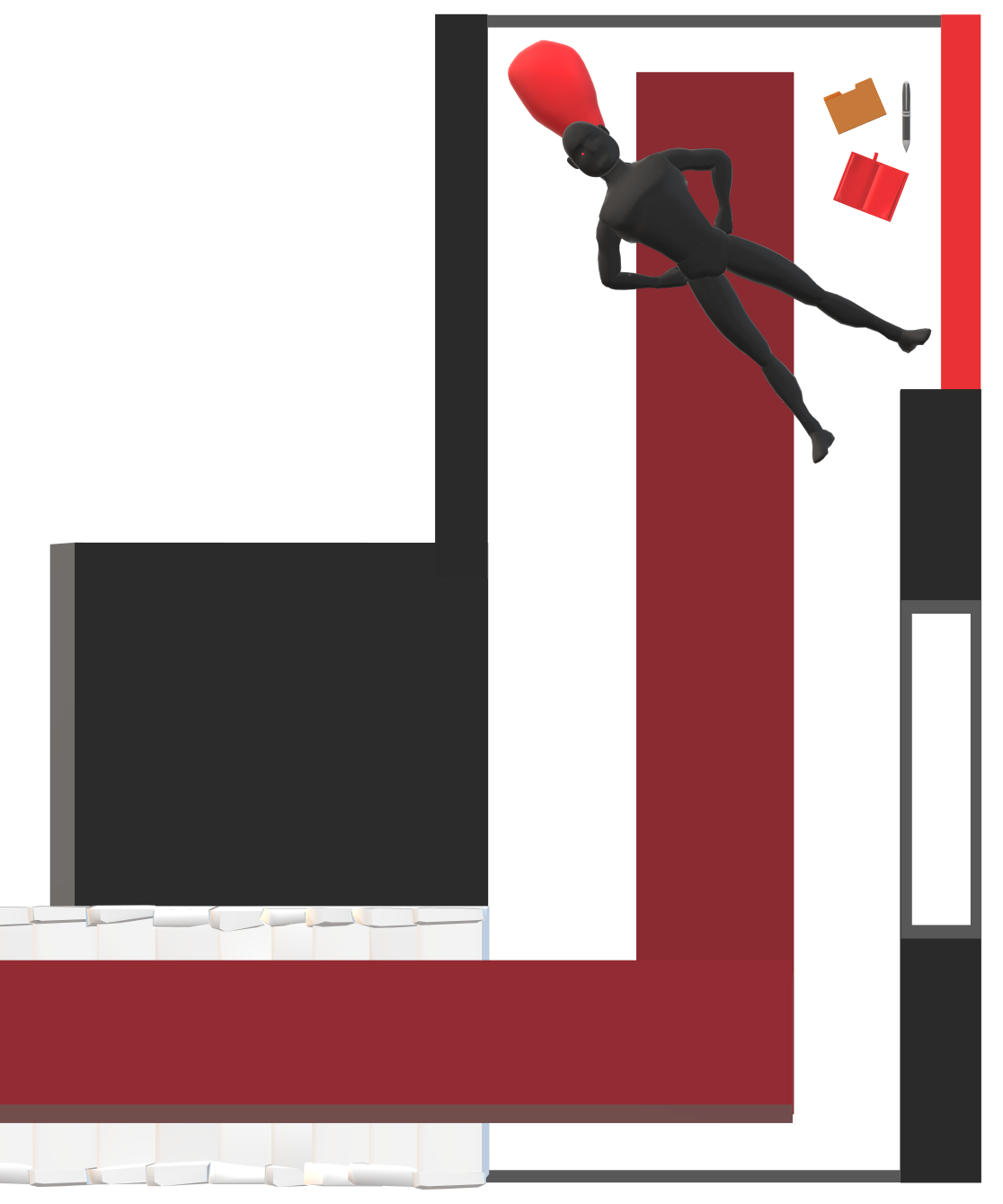
Schematic representation of the crime scene, seen from above (distances not respected).

The victim was in a cramped area on the 5th and top floor of the building at 50, rue Copernic. To his right were the building's stairs and elevator. To his left, a condemned grounded-glass window looked out onto the courtyard. The marble floor was covered with a dark red carpet. The victim's body laid on its back across the landing, feet in the apartment doorway, head towards the black iron railing, with a bloodstain. Surrounding the body were all the belongings the victim had been carrying out of the apartment: car keys, a pen, a cell phone and a large red diary (see diagram opposite).

The forensic identification technicians looked for a genetic fingerprint on the landing, but given that the stairwell is a semi-open environment and the crime scene was polluted (notably by the intervention of the fire department), no trace was found. The entire building was then inspected, and a cigarette butt was found on the first floor. The piece of evidence was sealed, but not used at first. When the investigators decided to look for a DNA trace, the evidence was too old and could no longer be used.

=== Ballistic and forensic examination ===
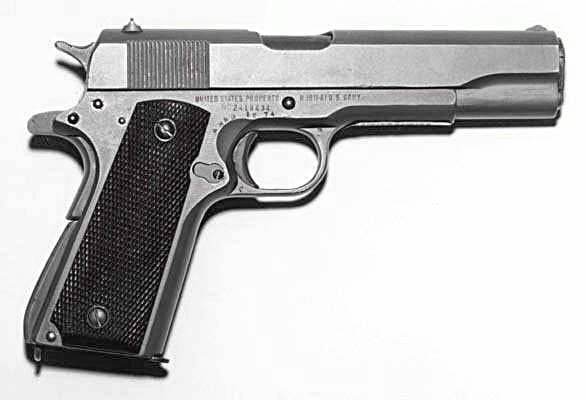
A Colt 45, the firearm used in the murder.

An impact was found in the back wall of the first floor, 93.5 cm high and 30 cm from the corner of the wall. Just below, the technicians found a deformed projectile. Near the victim's left hand, a case was found with the inscription: "S&B". No DNA traces were found on the case. The same analyses determined that only one shot had been fired, with a Colt 45, loaded with 11.43 mm caliber ammunition. The ammunition, a Sellier & Bellot brand sold in thousands, could not be traced back to the shooter.

Francis Imbard's body was taken to the Paris forensic medical institute for autopsy. It was established that his death was caused by the single shot, fired at point-blank range, i.e. that the tip of the gun had hit the victim. The bullet entered the body 3 cm below the right eye, and exited behind the left earlobe. The bullet's trajectory was therefore as follows: front to back, right to left and top to bottom. The victim was standing when the shot was fired, before collapsing on his back. The shot caused encephalic injuries, bone lesions and damage to the veins. There were no signs of violence or struggle, indicating that the murder was rapid, and carried out directly, as soon as the victim left his home. These indications were not enough to define with certainty whether the shooter was male or female, and whether he was shorter or taller than the victim.

=== Preliminary questions ===
The investigators first conducted a neighborhood survey. All those present at the time of the shooting were interviewed. The building housed law firms and consulting firms. All employees, clients, couriers and deliverymen heard the blast, but no one saw anything out of the ordinary. The building's electronic lock was activated only after 7 pm, allowing a steady flow of people throughout the day.

However, the building's janitor reported having seen and experienced some unusual events on the morning of the crime: 40 minutes before the shooting, she noticed that an EDF agent was in the courtyard, even though she had not been told he was coming. She contacted the building manager, who confirmed that no one was supposed to be in the building at the time. She could not see his face, but described him as a man around 1.76 m tall, weighing 70 kg, with brown hair. The investigation failed to locate the man. Then, just as she was about to go upstairs to deliver the mail, a perfume representative came to her door. She said she could not see her face, but described her as a woman of about 1.65 m, 70 kg, with dull hair. When the shot was fired, she left in a hurry. The investigators then decided to question the other concierges in the neighborhood, but none of them had received a visit from this representative. The investigators then thought that this person might be an accomplice, responsible for keeping the concierge at home, but she could not be identified.

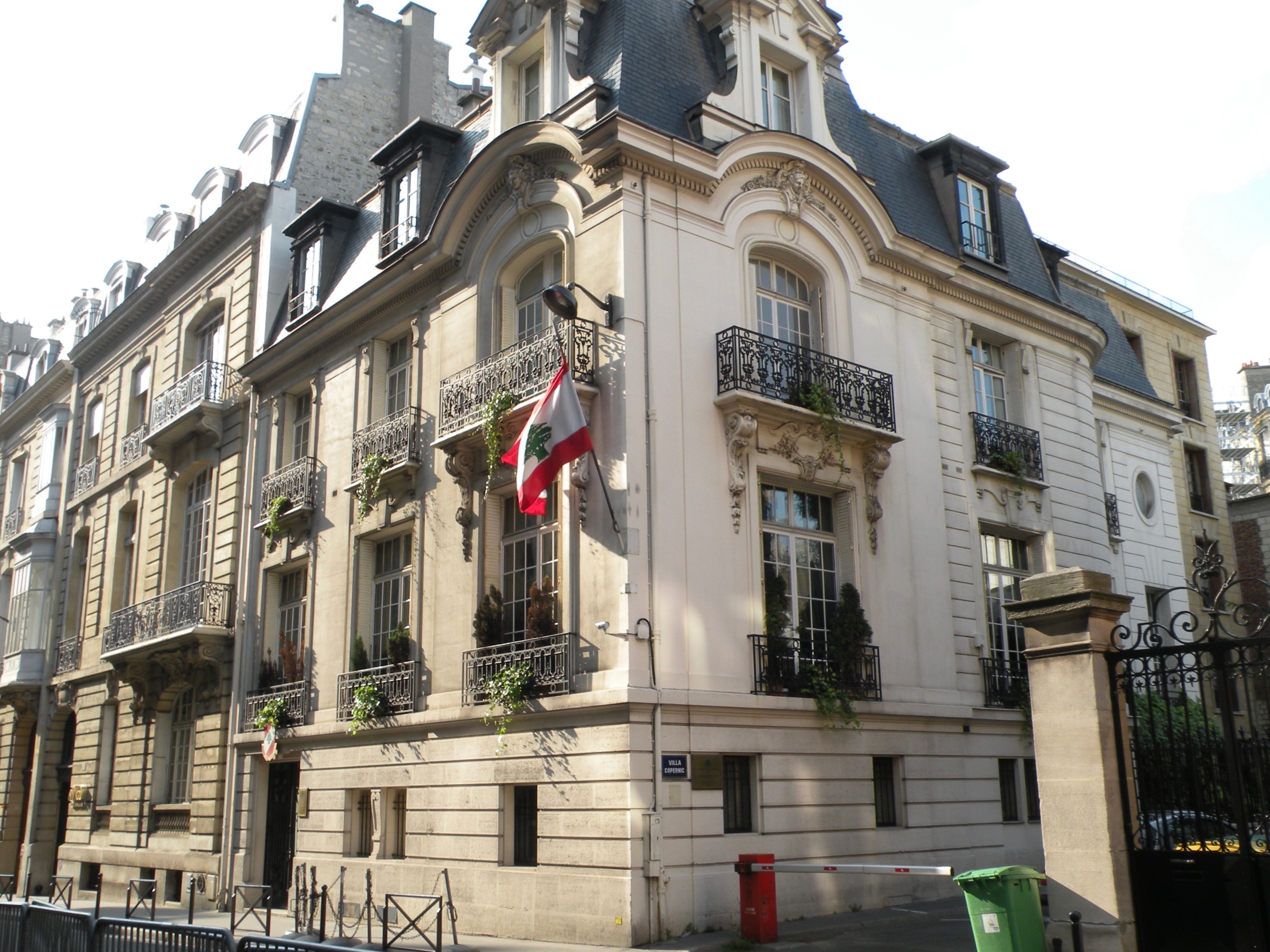
The Lebanese Embassy, located at no. 42 rue Copernic.

After interviewing the people in the building, the investigators questioned local shopkeepers and residents, but no one had seen anything in particular. They then noticed that a few meters away was the Lebanese embassy, a building surrounded by video surveillance cameras. One of these was pointed at the corner of the sidewalk, giving access to the crime scene. However, investigators discovered that the cameras were not recording images that day.

Three days after the crime, Julie Imbard went to 36, quai des Orfèvres, to report an eye-witness testimony she had collected. The day after the murder, while she was at the Brasil Tropical, an employee told her that she had been at the bottom of the building at the time of the shooting, and had thus seen her father's killer. The Brazilian woman, named Sueli, confided that she had seen the killer and was sure she knew him. She was summoned, but changed her story and said she had seen nothing. A confrontation was organized between her and Julie, but she gave no evidence. She was then released and left, without having given any information, before quickly returning to Brazil.

All these investigations failed to establish a description of the shooter.

=== Investigation leads ===
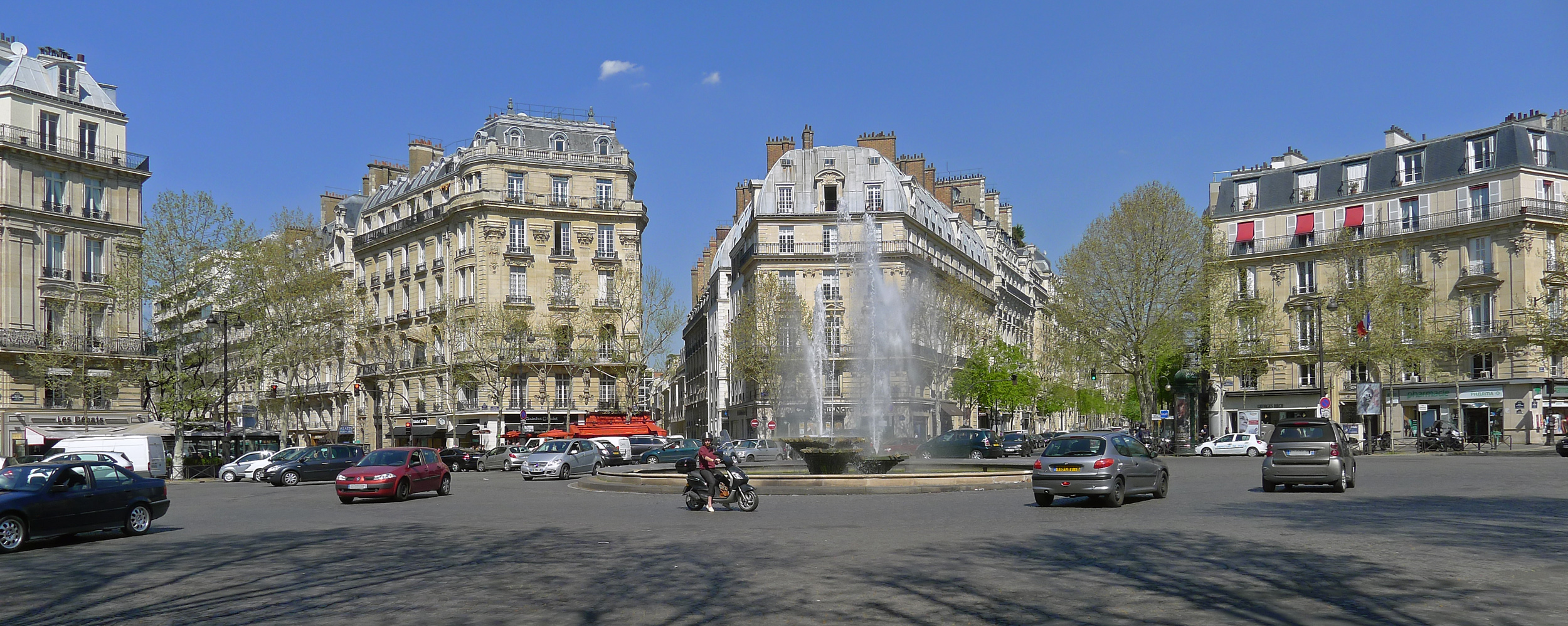
Sueli was lodged by Francis Imbard, not far from Place Victor-Hugo.

Although a few days after the murder, the investigators favored the idea of a settling of scores, they were exploring other leads. Three possible leads emerged. The first one had to do with a crime of passion, as Francis Imbard, described as a "born seducer," faced these suspicions following his separation from his wife. Investigators explored two relationships: one with his Brazilian employee, Sueli, who was ruled out as a suspect due to lack of motive, and the other with his official mistress and lawyer. Testimonies suggested the relationship was ending, and she owned a firearm. However, her alibi, a phone call from a lawyer's office, and bank visit provided no evidence linking her to the crime.

The second possible lead had to do with Imbard's generosity and wealth, as he had a habit of lending large sums of money. Investigators considered the possibility of a debtor with a motive to kill him to avoid repayment. Two individuals emerged from their inquiries, but they both were released due to unmatching and lacking of evidence

The third and last lead they followed was the one which involved an ex-collaborator seeking revenge, since Francis Imbard, a prominent figure in the Paris nightlife scene, faced a series of troubling events. In the late 1990s, his club, L'Enfer, faced internal issues with its security team taking control and engaging in unauthorized activities. This led to incidents (fatal overdose, cardiorespiratory arrest), administrative closure, and subsequent restructuring. Imbard, facing threats and violence, parted ways with key individuals, including Mohamed, a former bouncer turned partner, who later exhibited hostile behavior.

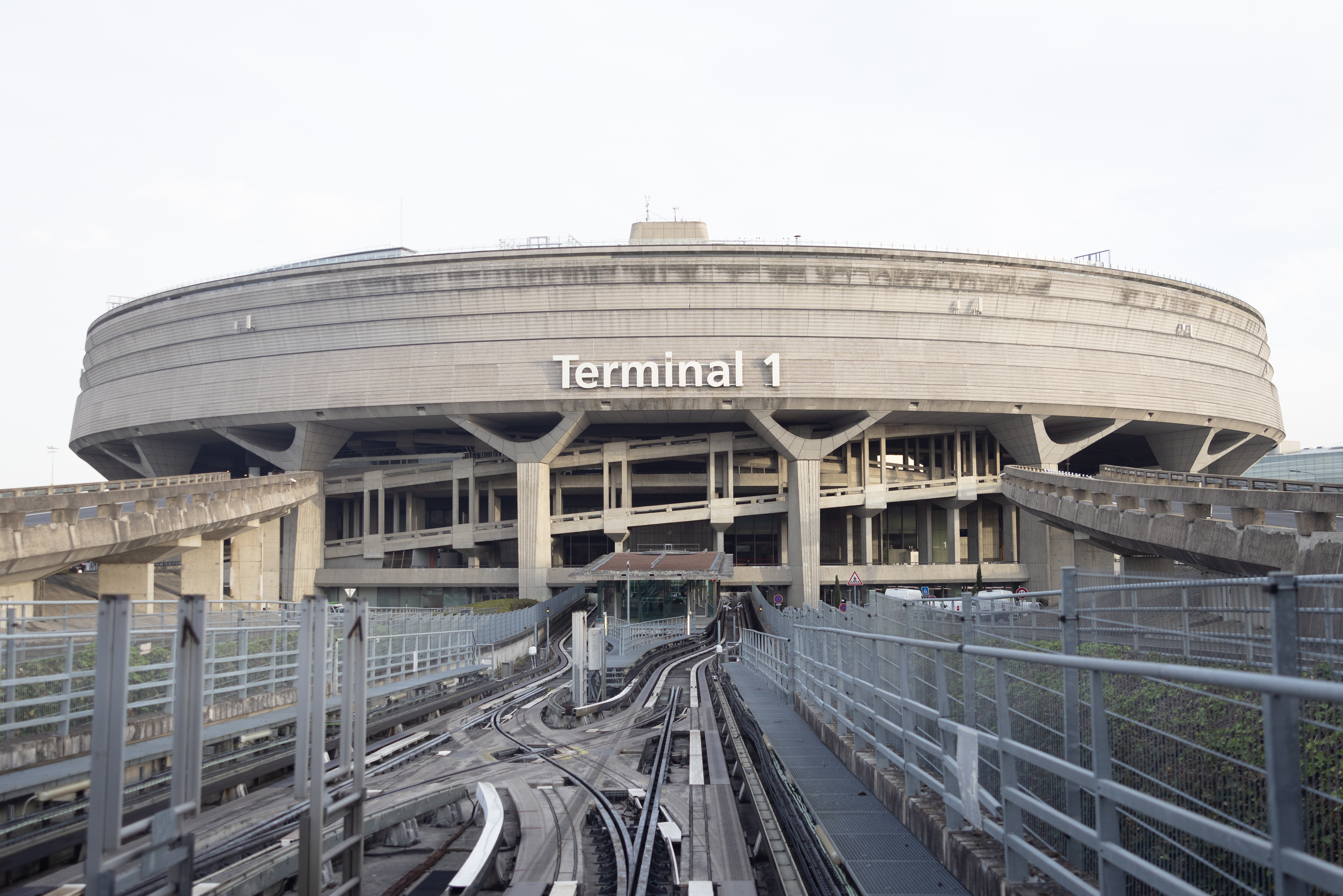
An exterior view of Paris-Charles-de-Gaulle airport, the location linked to the alibi of Mohamed and a second man.

Imbard, suspecting Mohamed's involvement in two unresolved assaults on him, his wife and two kids, refused to sell his establishments to him. Mohamed, accused of theft and issuing threats, had an alibi on the day of the murder but exhibited suspicious behavior, such as changing SIM cards and leaving for Brazil immediately after the crime. Investigators pursued the possibility of a hired hitman and identified two suspects. One, a former night watchman at Imbard's club, had a suspicious location on the day of the murder but lacked sufficient evidence for detention. Another, a Spanish man with a firearm, presented conflicting alibis, discrepancies in travel records, and an expired passport. However, he was eventually released without clarifying these inconsistencies. The investigation continued to uncover the motive and perpetrator behind Francis Imbard's murder.

=== Further details ===
In February 2004, Mohamed Rabehi, Francis Imbard's ex-partner, faced charges related to financial misconduct, accused of diverting substantial sums from L'Enfer's funds to foreign accounts. The case was dismissed in October 2008 by Judge Émilie Petel, but the Imbard family's lawyer pursued an appeal, leading to a reopening of the investigation in 2011 under a new examining magistrate. New DNA analyses and police custody orders were initiated following a broadcast on France 2.

In 2014, a new judge revealed the indictment of one of Mohamed's associates for complicity in the murder, but the indictment was quashed on procedural grounds. The same suspect faced charges for the rape of his daughter and was released on parole. In January 2017, a fresh magistrate took over, deciding to interview Julie and Lionel, who had not been heard previously. In December 2021, Sabine Khéris, the current investigating judge, indicted Mohamed Rabehi, already implicated in the case, for allegedly ordering the murder. Additionally, Serge C., previously indicted in 2014, was accused of facilitating the crime.

== See also ==
- List of unsolved murders (2000–present)

== Bibliography ==
=== Bibliography ===
- Willemin, Véronique (2014). Les Secrets de la nuit: Enquête sur 50 ans de liaisons dangereuses : argent, sexe, police, politique, réseaux. Paris: Flammarion. ISBN 978-2-08-126446-5.

=== Mediagraphy ===
- Arnaud Poivre d'Arvor & Jean-Marc Bloch (presenters) (October 2, 2011). L'affaire Francis Imbard (Motion picture). Non élucidé (in French). France 2. online presentation, on Imdb.
- Jacques Pradel (presenter), Perrine Suquet and Margaux Agnès (reporters), Alexandre Calzan (producer), Véronique Willemin, Jean-Marc Bloch, Philippe Valent and Claude Cancès (guests) (March 26, 2014). Enquête dans les secrets de la nuit parisienne : l'affaire Imbard (Radio broadcast). L'Heure du crime (in French). RTL.online presentation, on rtl.fr (in French)
- Jean-Marc Morandini (presenter) (May 2, 2016). Première partie (Francis Imbard) (Television production). Crimes en direct (in French). NRJ 12. online presentation, on Jean-Marc Morandini's blog (in French)
- Florence Kieffer (producer) (September 6, 2017). Justice, le douloureux silence (Television production) (in French). France 5. online presentation, on télérama.fr (in French) online presentation on francetvpro.fr (in French)
- Arnaud Poivre d'Arvor, Jean-Marc Bloch and Negar Haeri (presenters) (November 8, 2018). L'affaire Francis Imbard (Television production). Non élucidé, l'enquête continue (in French). RMC Story.
- Jean-Alphonse Richard (presenter), Julie Imbard, Philippe Valent et Thimothée Boutry (guests) (October 24, 2022). Meurtre de Francis Imbard : qui a tué le patron de l'Enfer ? (Radio broadcast). L'heure du crime (in French). RTL. online presentation, on rtl.fr (in French)
- Faustine Bollaert (presenter), Julie Imbard (speaker) (January 27, 2023). Affaires non élucidées : l'insoutenable attente des familles (Television production). Ça commence aujourd'hui (in French). France 2. video excerpt on YouTube (in French)
