= A Gang Story =

- Directed by: Olivier Marchal
- Produced by: Cyril Colbeau-Justin; Jean-Baptiste Dupont
- Starring: Gérard Lanvin; Tchéky Karyo; Daniel Duval
- Cinematography: Denis Rouden
- Edited by: Raphaële Urtin
- Music by: Erwann Kermorvant
- Distributed by: Gaumont
- Release date: 10 November 2011 (Sarlat Film Festival)
- Running time: 102 minutes
- Country: France
- Language: French
- Budget: $21.5 million
- Box office: $10.1 million

A Gang Story (French: Les Lyonnais) is a 2011 French drama film directed by Olivier Marchal. Michel Neyret was the real-life inspiration for this film.

== Cast ==
- Gérard Lanvin - Edmond "Momon" Vidal
- Tchéky Karyo - Serge Suttel
- Daniel Duval - Christo
- Lionnel Astier - Dany
- Dimitri Storoge - young "Momon" Vidal
- Patrick Catalifo - Kommissar Max Brauner
- François Levantal - Joan Chavez
- Francis Renaud - Brandon
- Valeria Cavalli - Janou Vidal
- Estelle Skornik - Lilou Suttel
- Étienne Chicot - The Greek
- Palwinder Singh - PS

== Remake ==
In 2020, a Hindi-language Indian remake titled Yaara was released.
