= Un ticket pour l'espace =

- Directed by: Éric Lartigau
- Screenplay by: Kad Merad; Olivier Baroux; Julien Rappeneau
- Produced by: Cyril Colbeau-Justin; Jean-Baptiste Dupont; Hugues Darmois
- Starring: Kad Merad; Olivier Baroux; Marina Foïs; Guillaume Canet; André Dussollier
- Cinematography: Régis Blondeau
- Edited by: Reynald Bertrand
- Music by: Erwann Kermorvant
- Production companies: Gaumont; LGM Productions; M6 Films; KL Productions
- Distributed by: Gaumont Columbia TriStar Films
- Release date: 18 January 2006 (France)
- Running time: 90 minutes
- Country: France
- Language: French
- Budget: $10.9 million
- Box office: $5.6 million

Un ticket pour l'espace is a French comedy film directed by Éric Lartigau released in 2006.

== Plot ==
In the year 2005, a contest is organised to convince French people on the interest of space research and its budget. The contest consists of a scratch game with millions of scratchcards, where the two winners will receive tickets for space. The winners leave for the French orbital station with two professional astronauts and a scientist. However, once in space, the adventure takes an unexpected turn. One of the contestants, who cheated to obtain his ticket, is revealed to be a dangerous madman seeking revenge.

== Cast ==
- Kad Merad as Stéphane Cardoux
- Olivier Baroux as Colonel Romain Beaulieu
- Marina Foïs as Soizic Le Guilvinec
- Guillaume Canet as Alexandre Yonis / Alexandre Guérin / Bernard Guérin
- André Dussollier as Werburger
- Pierre-François Martin-Laval as Poushy
- Frédéric Proust as Professor Rochette
- Frédérique Bel as Miss France
- Martin Jobert as Hugo
- Emmanuelle Cosso as Valérie Mertens
- Jacques Lafolye as Charlemagne
- Jean-Pierre Lazzerini as Yves Bugier
- Éric Lartigau as The director
- Thierry Frémont as theater professor
- Vincent Moscato as vigil
- Judith El Zein as Soizic's Colleague
- Anne Marivin as female astronaut
- Véronique Barrault as press officer
- Éric Brats as doctor
- François Clavier as jailer
- Éric Naggar as minister
