= Brigade de répression du banditisme =

French police units

The Brigade de Répression du Banditisme ('Banditry Repression Brigade') or 'Antigang' are police special units of the French Ministry of the Interior (Ministère de l'Intérieur). They are in charge of armed robberies, serious burglaries and scams, stolen cars and art thefts.

The first analogue of the Brigade de répression du banditisme was created in 1894, when the Sûreté service seconded the so-called “voie publique” brigade to the headquarters of the Paris police. The main task of the "voie publique Brigade" was the fight against crime, which takes place in an ordinary, but nevertheless very hostile environment: on the street.

In 1948, Commissioner Charles Chenevier organized and led, under the auspices of la Sûreté nationale, a group called "Brigade de répression du banditisme". In addition to Commissioner Chenevier himself, the group included Commissioner Gillard, Inspector Leclerc, Inspector Hours and Inspector Roger Bornish.

== In popular culture ==
- The BRB of Paris (BRB-PP) is featured in the 2004 film Department 36.
- In the 2024 TV series Cat's Eyes, Quentin Chapuis lead a special unit of the BRB.

== See also ==
- Brigade de recherche et d'intervention
- Brigade Régionale d'Enquête et de Coordination
- Unité de coordination de la lutte antiterroriste
- Service de protection des hautes personnalités
- Unité mobile d'intervention et de protection de la Préfecture de Police
