= Mea Culpa (2014 film) =

- Theatrical release poster
- Directed by: Fred Cavayé
- Screenplay by: Fred Cavayé; Guillaume Lemans; Olivier Marchal
- Story by: Olivier Marchal
- Produced by: Cyril Colbeau-Justin; Sidonie Dumas; Jean-Baptiste Dupont
- Starring: Vincent Lindon; Gilles Lellouche; Nadine Labaki; Velibor Topić
- Cinematography: Danny Elsen
- Edited by: Benjamin Weill
- Music by: Cliff Martinez
- Production companies: LGM Productions; Gaumont; TF1 Films Production; K.R. Productions; Bad Company; Nexus Factory uMedia
- Distributed by: Gaumont; Fox International Productions
- Release date: 5 February 2014
- Running time: 90 minutes
- Country: France
- Language: French
- Budget: $18.4 million
- Box office: $3.7 million

Mea Culpa is a 2014 French thriller film directed by Fred Cavayé, starring Vincent Lindon, Gilles Lellouche and Nadine Labaki.

== Plot ==
A police inspector and his former colleague investigate a series of murders in Toulon. Eventually they detect a killer gang who works for the Serbian mafia. The criminals stop at nothing to follow through on their mission but neither do the two Frenchmen.

== Cast ==
- Vincent Lindon as Simon
- Gilles Lellouche as Franck
- Nadine Labaki as Alice
- Max Baissette de Malglaive as Théo
- Gilles Cohen as Pastor
- Medi Sadoun as Jacquet
- Velibor Topić as Milan
- Cyril Lecomte as Jean-Marc
- Gilles Bellomi as Andréi
- Sofia Essaïdi as Myriam
- Sacha Petronijevic as Pietr
- Pierre Benoist as Boris
- Alexis Manenti as Slobodan
- Tomi May as Oleg
- Eric Bougnon as Karl
- Pierre Nisse as Kevin
- Justine Fabre as Manon
