= The Last Deadly Mission =

- Directed by: Olivier Marchal
- Written by: Oliver Marchal
- Produced by: Franck Chorot
- Starring: Daniel Auteuil; Olivia Bonamy; Catherine Marchal
- Cinematography: Denis Roudens
- Edited by: Raphaëlle Urtin
- Music by: Bruno Coulais
- Distributed by: Gaumont
- Release date: 12 March 2008
- Running time: 124 minutes
- Country: France
- Language: French
- Budget: $13.2 million
- Box office: $9.5 million

The Last Deadly Mission, also known as MR 73, is a 2008 French film noir written and directed by Olivier Marchal.

== Synopsis ==
Louis Schneider is a French law enforcer who serves in the French Judiciary Police Regional Service. He is assigned to detect a serial killer and tries to live up to his superior's expectations. But then it is brought to his notice that a convict called Charles Subra will be released early for he pretends he had found God and he would now deeply regrets his former bad deeds. Schneider doesn't believe any of it. Neither does Justine, whose parents were once murdered by Subra. Justine teams up with Schneider because she knows he brought Subra to justice once before. She hopes he can do it again although he is an alcoholic.

== Background ==
The film title refers to a revolver made in France: Manurhin MR 73

== Reception ==
The film received mixed reviews but Daniel Auteuil's performance was praised unequivocally.

== Cast ==
- Daniel Auteuil: Louis Schneider
- Olivia Bonamy: Justine Maxence
- Catherine Marchal: Marie Angéli
- Francis Renaud: Kovalski
- Gérald Laroche: Matéo
- Guy Lecluyse: Jumbo
- Philippe Nahon: Charles Subra
  - Grégory Gadebois: Young Charles Subra
- Clément Michu: Émile Maxence, Justine's grandfather
- Moussa Maaskri: Ringwald
- Christian Mazzuchini: Roques
- Louise Monot: Blandine
- Maxim Nucci: Richard
- Valéry Zeitoun: Maître Lomach
- Yasmine Lafitte: the prostitute
- Anne Charrier: the veterinarian
