= I Do (2006 film) =

- French theatrical poster
- French: Prête-moi ta main
- Directed by: Éric Lartigau
- Written by: Alain Chabat; Philippe Mechelen; Laurent Tirard; Grégoire Vigneron; Laurent Zeitoun
- Produced by: Amandine Bilot; Patrick Bordier; Alain Chabat
- Starring: Alain Chabat; Charlotte Gainsbourg; Bernadette Lafont
- Cinematography: Régis Blondeau
- Edited by: Juliette Welfling
- Music by: Erwann Kermorvant
- Distributed by: Mars Distribution
- Release date: 1 November 2006
- Running time: 90 minutes
- Country: France
- Language: French
- Budget: $9 million
- Box office: $30.2 million

I Do (French: Prête-moi ta main; lit. 'Lend me your hand') or Rent a Wife (international working title), is a 2006 French romantic comedy film directed by Éric Lartigau, based on an original idea by Alain Chabat. The film stars Charlotte Gainsbourg, Alain Chabat and Bernadette Lafont. It is Chabat and Gainsbourg's third collaboration, after Ils se marièrent et eurent beaucoup d'enfants (2004) and The Science of Sleep (2006). This film was officially remade into an Indian Telugu language film Manmadhudu 2 released in August 2019.

== Plot summary ==
Luis Campos (Alain Chabat), 43, happily single, mollycoddled by his family (mother and 5 sisters, who by design established by his late father Hercule form a kind of family council known as the G7), has a successful career as a perfumer and an easy life. Tired of taking care of him, the G7 decide he should get married within a year. The problem is Luis does not want any kind of serious relationship since they ruined his first true love. After turning down all the girls introduced to him, he gets an idea: "rent" his best friend's sister, Emma (Charlotte Gainsbourg), turn her into the perfect bride-to-be, and make her not show up on their wedding day. That way, Luis thinks his family will leave him alone. Unfortunately for him, his family likes Emma and blames him when she apparently jilts him at the altar. He then comes up with an alternate plan to have Emma act horribly towards his family so they will not like her anymore. The two begin to fall in love so Luis finally stands up to his family, confesses his schemes and finally settles down with Emma.

== Cast ==
- Alain Chabat - Luis Costa
- Charlotte Gainsbourg - Emma
- Bernadette Lafont - Geneviève Costa
- Wladimir Yordanoff - Francis Bertoff
- Grégoire Oestermann - Pierre-Yves
- Véronique Barrault - Catherine
- Marie-Armelle Deguy - Axelle
- Aïssa Maïga - Kirsten Hansen
- Katia Lewkowicz - Carole
- Louise Monot - Maxine
- Anne Marivin - Sales Associate
- Éric Lartigau - A passerby

== Production ==
Alain Chabat originally came up with the idea for the film and planned to produce the film and write the script. Director Éric Lartigau asked him to play the role of Luis so he rewrote the character as an older man. Over a five-year period Chabat's original script went through seven different rewrites by four other scriptwriters. Chabat decided to include a scene where the character of Emma watches an action film. After comparing different Chinese kung fu films, he settled on a 100-second fight sequence from the Indian film Muthu (1995).

The film was shot in Mézy-sur-Seine, and in different parts of Paris, including the Parisian suburb of Pantin.

== Box office reception ==
Released on November 1, 2006, in France, the film went straight to #1 at the box office, grossing over a million tickets. It spent six consecutive weeks in the box office top 10. By December 19, the film had reached the 3 million tickets sold mark. It eventually sold just over 3.5 million tickets, making it the second most successful film of 2007 at the French box office.

== Awards and nominations ==
- César Awards (France)
  - Nominated: Best Actor – Leading Role (Alain Chabat)
  - Nominated: Best Actress – Leading Role (Charlotte Gainsbourg)
  - Nominated: Best Actress – Supporting Role (Bernadette Lafont)
