= 36 (film) =

- Theatrical release poster
- Directed by: Olivier Marchal
- Written by: Olivier Marchal; Franck Mancuso; Julien Rappeneau
- Produced by: Franck Chorot; Cyril Colbeau-Justin; Jean-Baptiste Dupont
- Starring: Daniel Auteuil; Gérard Depardieu; André Dussollier; Roschdy Zem; Valeria Golino
- Cinematography: Denis Rouden
- Edited by: Hugues Darmois
- Music by: Erwann Kermorvant; Axelle Renoir
- Production companies: Gaumont; LGM Productions; TF1 Films Production; KL Productions; Canal+ CinéCinéma; Uni Etoile 2
- Distributed by: Gaumont Columbia TriStar Films
- Release date: 24 November 2004
- Running time: 110 minutes
- Country: France
- Language: French
- Budget: $15 million
- Box office: $18.3 million

36 (French: 36 Quai des Orfèvres) is a 2004 French film directed by Olivier Marchal and starring Daniel Auteuil and Gérard Depardieu. The title derives from the original address of the Judicial Police headquarters, part of the larger Palais de Justice of Paris on the Île de la Cité. The film takes place in Paris, where two cops (Auteuil and Depardieu) are competing for the vacant seat of chief of the Paris Criminal police while involved in a search for a gang of violent thieves. The film is directed by Olivier Marchal, a former police officer who spent 12 years in the French police. The story is loosely inspired from real events which occurred during the 1980s in France (see the gang des postiches arrest). The film was nominated for eight César Awards. The movie was remade in South Korea in 2019 as The Beast.

== Plot ==
Two Prefecture of Police officers: Léo Vrinks (Daniel Auteuil), head of the BRI and Denis Klein (Gérard Depardieu), head of the BRB, both in Paris, wish to succeed their superior, the chief of the criminal police (André Dussolier), who is being promoted. Success depends on catching a murderous and highly active gang of armoured-car robbers. Another source of rivalry is that Camille (Valeria Golino), Vrinks' wife, used to be Klein's lover.

Vrinks is an effective detective with loyal subordinates and some unsavory informants. Klein, who has questionable ethics, is less accomplished. Consequently, his marriage is strained and he drinks heavily. Vrinks helps people such as a bartender, who is raped and beaten by Bruno (Ivan Franek) while being robbed. Vrinks and his team kidnap Bruno, drive him to a forest where they strip and bind him, give him a mock execution, push him into an open grave, warn him to leave the bartender alone, and then abandon him.

Vrinks' use of informants backfires when one on weekend release from prison, Silien (Roschdy Zem), tricks him into being his getaway driver when he murders a gangster whose testimony convicted him. Silien, in a quid pro quo for Vrinks' providing an alibi and keeping silent, tells him about the gang's personnel and hideout. Vrinks, implicated in the murder, has little choice but to agree. The victim was an informant of Klein, who suspects Silien of involvement.

Vrinks' team stake out the hideout, with Klein's team as backup but, on the verge of arrests, Klein ignores procedure and drunkenly approaches the gang. While most are still apprehended, an alerted car load open fire, killing Vrinks' best friend and taking a detective hostage. Later, she escapes and one of the criminals is caught and another shot while trying to force a roadblock.

An investigation is launched into the detective's death, but one of Klein's informants coincidentally introduces him to a prostitute who witnessed the murder by Silien. Discovering Vrinks' role, Klein ensures he is prosecuted, meaning that Vrinks' evidence on the gang arrest is inadmissible and Klein exonerated of blame. He offers Camille help but she rejects him. While under arrest, awaiting proceedings, Vrinks disarms his guards, to allow him talk to his wife Camille in the court corridor.

Camille is invited to a meeting by Silien, but her phone is being tapped by Klein's team, who are seeking him. Silien gets into her car and offers her money to live on. Klein, who has been tailing her, orders his team to move in to capture Silien despite being warned of the danger to Camille. They flee but Klein orders that Camille's small and insubstantial car forced off the road and she and Silien are killed in the crash. Klein uses Silien's gun to shoot the dead Camille, then uses his own gun to shoot Silien's body. It now looks like Silien shot Camille, causing the crash, and Klein then shot Silien in self-defence, absolving him of responsibility for their deaths.

Seven years later, Vrinks is released. Klein, who now heads the Paris criminal police, kept his team silent about the truth of Camille's death by promotions, retirements and transfers. Vrinks reunites with his daughter, telling her they are leaving after some unfinished business. He visits Titi, an old colleague, who now works at a club, to find out about Camille's death. They have a spontaneous fight with men who seemed familiar, namely Bruno's friends, who threaten revenge. Later, Bruno ambushes Titi and discovers he was one of the policemen who humiliated him before. He demands to know the names of the others before beating him into a permanent coma.

Vrinks gets a gun to take revenge on Klein, who is attending a police ball. Using a stolen ID, Vrinks attends and confronts Klein in the lavatory. Klein explains Camille was dead when he shot her, and Vrinks suggests he kill himself with Vrinks' gun to avoid exposure. After Vrinks leaves, Klein follows him out, shouting obscenities, threatening to shoot him and blaming him for Camille's death. Bruno, lying in wait, shoots Klein dead. It appears that Titi gave his attackers Klein's name, instead of Vrinks's.

The film ends with Vrinks and his daughter at airport security, heading for a new life abroad.

== Cast ==
- Daniel Auteuil as Léo Vrinks
- Gérard Depardieu as Denis Klein
- André Dussollier as Robert Mancini
- Roschdy Zem as Hugo Silien
- Valeria Golino as Camille Vrinks
- Anne Consigny as Hélène Klein
- Mylène Demongeot as Manou Berliner
- Francis Renaud as Titi Brasseur
- Daniel Duval as Eddy Valence
- Catherine Marchal as Ève Verhagen
- Guy Lecluyse as Groluc
- Alain Figlarz as Francis Horn
- Jo Prestia as Victor Dragan
- Vincent Moscato as Jenner
- Stéphane Metzger as Smao
- Olivier Marchal as Christo
- Solène Blasch as Lola Vrinks, 11 years old
- Aurore Auteuil as Lola Vrinks, 17 years old. (Daniel Auteuil's real-life daughter)

== Production ==
In naming the informant Silien, Olivier Marchal is making a conscious tribute to the whole genre of the French "Policier", Silien being a character in the classic film Le Doulos, played by Jean-Paul Belmondo.

== See also ==
- Cinema of France
