= Direction régionale de la police judiciaire de la préfecture de police de Paris =

Division of the Police judiciaire in Paris

Coordinates: 48°51′17″N 2°20′40″E

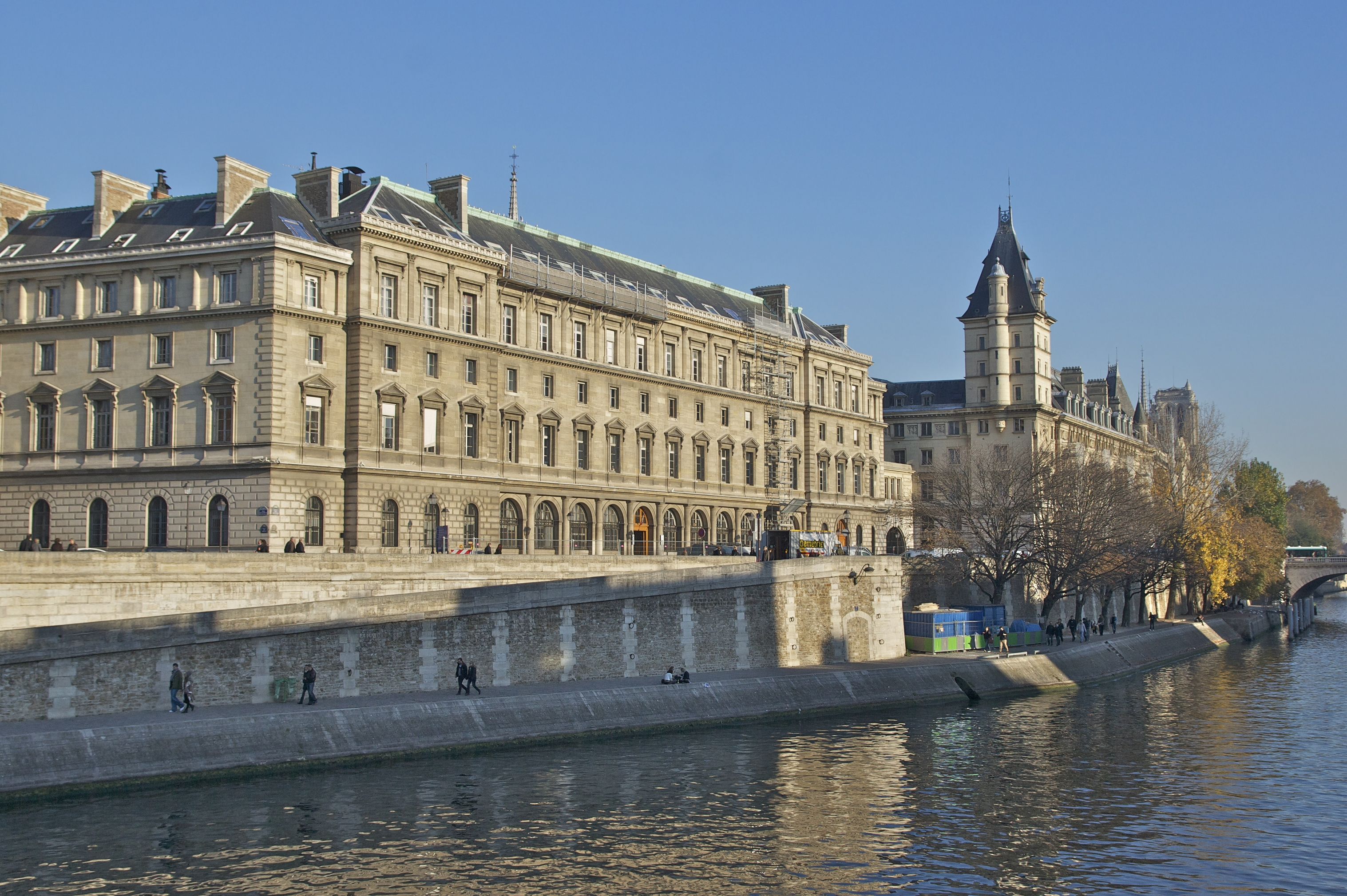
The 36 quai des Orfèvres, headquarters of the Paris judicial police

The Direction régionale de la police judiciaire de la préfecture de police de Paris (English: Regional Directorate of the Judicial Police of the Paris Police Prefecture) (DRPJ Paris), often called the 36 quai des Orfèvres or simply the 36 (trente-six) by the address of its headquarters, is the seat of the Paris regional division of the Central Directorate of the Judicial Police. Its 2,200 officers investigate about 15,000 crimes and offences a year.

The Judicial police (Police judiciaire; abbreviated PJ), is the criminal investigation division of the Police nationale.

36 quai des Orfèvres is often erroneously believed to be the address of the Central Directorate of the Judicial Police, the national authority of the criminal police, which is actually located at 11 rue des Saussaies, in the buildings of the Ministry of the Interior.

Since September 2017, DRPJ have their new headquarters at 36 rue du Bastion. This new building concentrated all services (before they were in different places). Only the Research and Intervention Brigade stay at 36 quai des Orfèvres.

== History ==
The PJ is the direct successor of the Sûreté, which was founded in 1812 by Eugène François Vidocq as the criminal investigative bureau of the Paris police. The Sûreté served later as an inspiration for Scotland Yard, the FBI and other departments of criminal investigation throughout the world.

In 1907, Georges Clemenceau, who was nicknamed "le tigre" ('the Tiger'), created the twelve "brigades régionales de police mobile", as per the suggestion of Célestin Hennion, then head of The Sûreté as follows: Paris ("1ère"), Lille ("2ème"), Caen ("3ème"), Nantes ("4ème"), Tours ("5ème"), Limoges ("6ème"), Bordeaux ("7ème"), Toulouse ("8ème"), Marseille ("9ème"), Lyon ("10ème"), Dijon ("11ème") et Châlons-sur-Marne ("12ème").

In 1913, the newly appointed Préfet de Police Célestin Hennion, continued the reforms of his predecessor by dividing the police force into three main departments, judicial, intelligence and policy agenda, hence giving the Parisian PJ its current form.

Most of the Parisian PJ moved to the Batignolles neighbourhood, in a new building shared with the Tribunal de grande instance, Paris's main tribunal. This project was criticized because of its cost and the historic status of the 36.

== Mandate ==
The Paris PJ comes under the control of the Paris Police Prefecture and operates over its territorial jurisdiction, which includes the city of Paris but also the three adjacent departments of Hauts-de-Seine, Seine-Saint-Denis and Val-de-Marne.

Under the direction and supervision of the judiciary, it is responsible for the fight against criminality and delinquency and for the implementation of all technical, scientific and operational police resources needed for the inquiries. It investigates cases which involve a large scale of crimes and infractions like drug trafficking, prostitution, racketeering, kidnapping, organised crime (either criminal or financial activities), hostage taking, bomb attacks, sexual assaults, or homicides.

== Organization ==
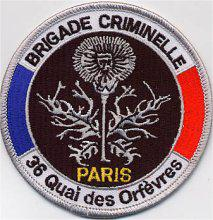
Brigade criminelle patch

The Paris PJ services and units are:

- the état-major with the director and its collaborators;
- the division of the six brigades centrales (central brigades):
  - the Brigade criminelle (criminal brigade – BC aka "la Crim'"), the oldest and perhaps most famous, especially in charge of homicides, kidnapping, bomb attacks and investigations involving personalities;
  - the Brigade de recherche et d'intervention (research and intervention brigade – BRI aka "l'Antigang"), an elite special intervention unit specialized in hostage taking, very serious cases of armed robbery and catching dangerous gangsters;
  - the Brigade de répression du banditisme (banditry repression brigade – BRB), mainly in charge of serious street infractions (bag snatching, burglary...), hold-ups and armed mugging but also of art trafficking and car robbery and trafficking;
  - the Brigade des stupéfiants (drugs brigade – BS aka "les Stups"), specialized in drug trafficking;
  - the Brigade de protection des mineurs (underages protection brigade – BPM aka "les Mineurs"), in charge of all infractions with victims under 18;
  - the Brigade de répression du proxénétisme (procuring repression brigade – BRP aka "la Mondaine") specialized in the surveillance of prostitution and the fight against procuring;
- the division of the territorial districts (Divisions de police judiciaire or DPJ):
  - 1ère DPJ (1st DPJ) with jurisdiction over the Center and West of Paris (1st, 2nd, 3rd, 4th, 8th, 9th, 16th, 17th arrondissements);
  - 2ème DPJ (2nd DPJ) with jurisdiction over the North and East of Paris (10th, 11th, 12th, 18th, 19th, 20th arrondissements);
  - 3ème DPJ (3rd DPJ) with jurisdiction over the South of Paris (5th, 6th, 7th, 13th, 14th, 15th arrondissements);
  - SDPJ (Service départemental de police judiciaire) of Hauts-de-Seine (SDPJ 92);
  - SDPJ of Seine-Saint-Denis (SDPJ 93);
  - SDPJ of Val-de-Marne (SDPJ 94);
- the economic and financial affairs division:
  - the Brigade financière (financial brigade), in charge of financial criminality;
  - the Brigade de répression de la délinquance astucieuse (fraud repression brigade);
  - the Brigade des fraudes aux moyens de paiement (method of payment frauds brigade);
  - the Brigade de répression de la délinquance économique (economic delinquency repression brigade);
  - the Brigade d'enquête sur les fraudes aux technologies de l'information (IT frauds inquiry brigade);
  - the Brigade de recherches et d'investigations financières (financial researches and investigations brigade);
- the investigation support division, which includes notably the Identité judiciaire (judicial identity) in charge of all the technical and scientific analyses.

The DPJ have the qualifications to investigate every kind of crime and infraction committed over their territory, while the central brigades take the most complex cases in their area of qualification and can operate anywhere.

Due to the lack of space, only a few services are still located in the historic building of the 36, quai des Orfèvres. Located there are the état-major, the Brigade criminelle, the Brigade des stupéfiants and the BRI. The other brigades and services are spread in several buildings throughout Paris.

== In fiction and films ==
Because of its history and its iconic status within the French police, the 36 and its services have often been described in novels, films and TV series.

- Commissaire Maigret, a fictional police detective created by Belgian writer Georges Simenon, was based at the Quai des Orfèvres.
- 36, Quai des Orfèvres figures in the novel Long Lost by Harlan Coben.
- Quai des Orfevres is a 1947 film directed by Henri-George Clouzot with Louis Jouvet, Simone Renant, Bernard Blier and Suzy Delair, based on a novel by Stanislaus-Andre Steeman.
- 36, Quai des Orfèvres is a 2004 film by Olivier Marchal, starring Daniel Auteuil, Gérard Depardieu and André Dussollier, centered on the rivalry between the BRB and the BRI. It is partially inspired by real events which occurred during the 1980s.
- The police drama series Spiral follows, among other actors of the Palais de justice, the work and life of three officers from the 2nd DPJ.
- In the novel The Da Vinci Code, the DCPJ was mentioned as the group that found out about Jacques Sauniere's death and is also the force that Sophie Neveu and Bezu Fache are part of.
- The drama film Polisse centers on the Child Protection Brigade (BPM) and a photographer who is assigned to cover the unit. The film won the Jury Prize at the 2011 Cannes Film Festival.

== See also ==
- French National Police
- The Francis Imbard affair
