= Éric Lartigau =

French director and screenwriter (born 1964)

Eric Lartigau
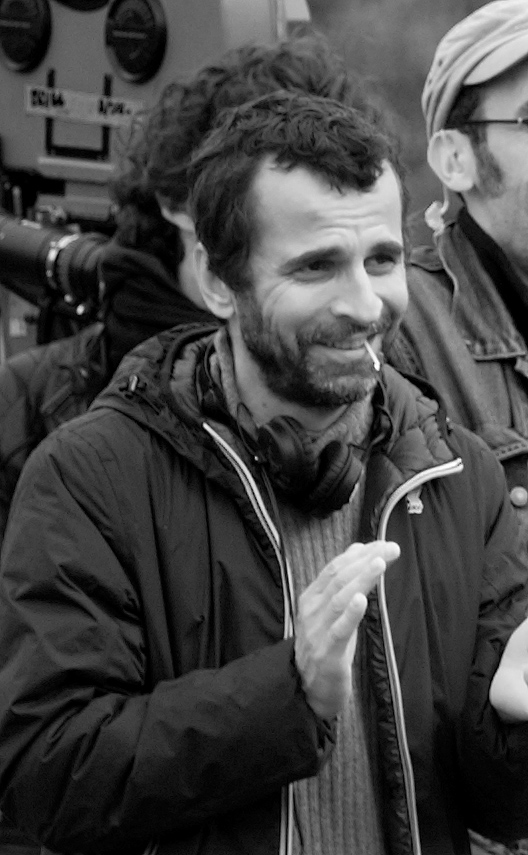
- Éric Lartigau in 2010
- Born: 16 May 1964 (age 62); Paris, France
- Occupations: Director, Screenwriter
- Years active: 1988–present
- Partner: Marina Foïs (2002–present)
- Children: 2

Eric Lartigau (born 20 June 1964) is a French director and screenwriter.

== Personal life ==
He started dating actress Marina Foïs in 1999. She gave birth to their son, named Lazare, on 3 December 2004; their second son, Georges, was born on 25 September 2008.

== Filmography ==
Year	Title	Role	Notes
1988–98	Les Guignols	Director	TV series 7 d'Or for Best Variety Show; 7 d'Or for Best Entertainment Show
1989	Les Maris, les Femmes, les Amants	Assistant director & Actor	Directed by Pascal Thomas
2000–01	H	Director	TV series (13 episodes)
2002	Making of	Director	TV series
2002	La Famille Guérin	Director	TV series (3 episodes)
2003	Mais qui a tué Pamela Rose ?	Director & Actor	
2005	Backstage	Actor	Directed by Emmanuelle Bercot
2006	I Do	Director & Actor	NRJ Ciné Award for Best Comedy Film
2006	Un ticket pour l'espace	Director & Actor	
2010	The Big Picture	Director & writer	Nominated - César Award for Best Adaptation
2011	Pourquoi tu pleures ?	Actor	Directed by Katia Lewkowicz
2012	The Players	Director	
2013	Des gens qui s'embrassent	Actor	Directed by Danièle Thompson
2014	La Famille Bélier	Director & writer	Magritte Award for Best Foreign Film in Coproduction; Sant Jordi Award for Best Foreign Film; Nominated - César Award for Best Film; Nominated - César Award for Best Original Screenplay; Nominated - European Film Award for Best Comedy; Nominated - Globes de Cristal Award for Best Film; Nominated - Lumière Award for Best Film; Nominated - Lumière Award for Best Screenplay
2019	Iamhere	Director & writer	
2022	Cet été-là	Director & writer	Based on the graphic novel This One Summer
