= Olivier Marchal =

French actor and director

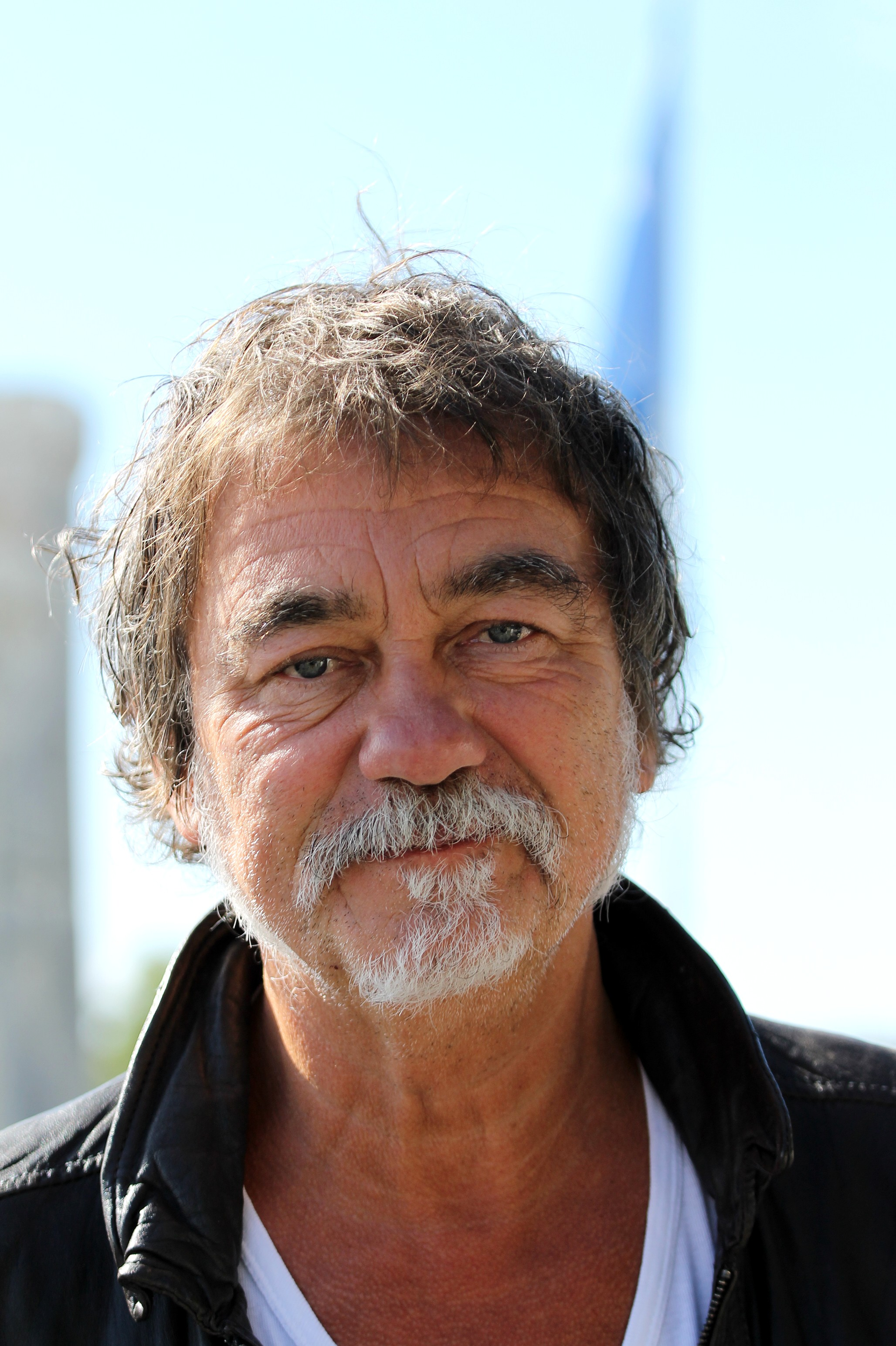
- Olivier Marchal in 2016
- Born: Olivier Marchal; 14 November 1958 (age 67); Talence, France
- Occupations: Actor, director, screenwriter, producer, policeman
- Years active: 1988–present
- Spouse: Catherine Quiniou (1995–2015)
- Children: 4

Olivier Marchal (born 14 November 1958) is a French actor, director, screenwriter, and a former policeman. In 2005, he was nominated for three César Awards (Best Director, Best Film and Best Original Screenplay or Adaptation) for his film 36 Quai des Orfèvres. He also created the popular French television police drama Braquo and wrote and directed some episodes in its first season (2009).

== Personal life ==
With Catherine Quiniou (Catherine Marchal), actress, married in 1995, Olivier Marchal is the father of four children: Léa born in 1994, Zoé born in 1998, Ninon born in 2006 and Basile born in 2010. The couple separated in 2015.

== Author ==
Year	Book	Publishing
2009	Braquo	Groupe Flammarion
2013	Aveux complets	Plon

== Filmography ==
Year	Title	Role	Director	Notes
1988	Let Sleeping Cops Lie	Ginzbaum's friend	José Pinheiro	
1990–91	Renseignements généraux	Desmarre	Claude Barma & Hugues de Laugardière	TV series (2 episodes)
1992	Brigada Central	Bebert	Pedro Masó	TV series (1 episode)
1992–93	Van Loc : un grand flic de Marseille	Serra	Claude Barrois	Also writer TV Series (3 episodes)
1993	Profil bas	Inspector Petrini	Claude Zidi	
1993	Prat et Harris	Tony	Boramy Tioulong	TV movie
1993	A Year in Provence	Louis	David Tucker	TV mini-series
1993–2001	Commissaire Moulin	Beuquerat / Vava	Yves Rénier, Gilles Béhat, ...	Also writer TV Series (10 episodes)
1994	Renseignements généraux	Lucien Favier	Boramy Tioulong (2)	TV series (1 episode)
1995	La femme piégée	The cop	Frédéric Compain	Also writer TV Movie
1995	Highlander: The Series	Philippe	Dennis Berry	TV series (1 episode)
1995–96	François Kléber	Writer	Patrick Jamain	TV series (3 episodes)
1996	Le dur métier de policier	Third cop	Vincent Ravalec	Short
1996	Groupe nuit	Writer	Patrick Jamain (2)	TV series (1 episode)
1997	Les vacances		Emmanuelle Bercot	Short
1997	Les boeuf-carottes	Robert Boisrond	Pierre Lary	TV series (1 episode)
1997	La Basse-cour	Writer	Christiane Lehérissey	Also Producer; TV Series (1 episode)
1997–2001	Quai n° 1	Max Urtéguy	Patrick Jamain (3), Marc Angelo, ...	TV series (12 episodes)
1999	Un bon flic	Writer	Olivier Marchal	Short
1999	Le gang des TV		Artus de Penguern	Short
1999	La puce	Marc	Emmanuelle Bercot (2)	Short
1999	Un coeur pas comme les autres	Gérard	André Buytaers	TV movie
1999	Josephine, Guardian Angel	Serge	Dominique Baron	TV series (1 episode)
2000	L'extraterrestre	Jean-Claude	Didier Bourdon	
2000	La petite absente	Sam	José Pinheiro (2)	TV movie
2000	Marc Eliot	Bertrand Pachet	Patrick Jamain (4)	TV series (1 episode)
2000–03	Police district	Commandant Rivière	Olivier Chavarot, Jean-Teddy Filippe, ...	TV series (16 episodes)
2001–09	Central nuit	Creator & Writer	Didier Delaître, Olivier Barma, ...	TV series (43 episodes)
2002	Gangsters	/	Olivier Marchal (2)	Also writer
2002	Chut !	Lieutenant Eddy Tasmani	Philippe Setbon	TV movie
2003	Capitaine Lawrence	Villeneuve	Gérard Marx	TV movie
2004	36 Quai des Orfèvres	Christo	Olivier Marchal (3)	Also writer Nominated - César Award for Best Film; Nominated - César Award for Best Director; Nominated - César Award for Best Original Screenplay or Adaptation
2004	Paul Sauvage	Paul Sauvage	Frédéric Tellier	TV movie
2004	Les robinsonnes	Fred	Laurent Dussaux	TV movie
2004	La tresse d'Aminata	Jean-Marc	Dominique Baron (2)	TV movie
2005	Éliane	Sylvestre	Caroline Huppert	TV movie
2006	Tell No One	Bernard Valenti	Guillaume Canet	
2006	Une simple histoire d'amour	Louis Schneider	Jean-Luc Mathieu	Short; Also writer
2006	Le sixième homme	François	Julien Lacombe & Pascal Sid	Short
2006	L'enfant d'une autre	Jérôme	Virginie Wagon	TV movie
2006	Les innocents	Dominique Célerin	Denis Malleval	TV movie
2007	Paris Lockdown	Jean-Guy	Frédéric Schoendoerffer	
2007	Scorpion	De Boers	Julien Seri	
2007	Confidences	Jean-Pierre	Laurent Dussaux (2)	TV mini-series
2007	Chez Maupassant	The master	Denis Malleval (2)	TV series (1 episode)
2008	The Last Deadly Mission	Writer	Olivier Marchal (4)	
2008	Anything for Her	Henri Pasquet	Fred Cavayé	
2008	Un roman policier	Viard	Stéphanie Duvivier	
2008	Le bruit des gens autour	Henri	Diastème	
2008–11	Flics	Creator & Writer	Nicolas Cuche & Thierry Petit	TV series (8 episodes); Globes de Cristal Award for Best Television Film or Television Series
2009	Diamant 13	Franck Novak	Gilles Béhat (2)	Also writer
2009	Quelque chose à te dire	Jacques de Parentis	Cécile Telerman	
2009	La saison des immortelles	Simon Charroux	Henri Helman	TV movie
2009–16	Braquo	Creator, Writer & Director	Xavier Palud, Frédéric Schoendoerffer (2), ...	TV series (32 episodes); Nominated - Globes de Cristal Award for Best Television Film or Television Series
2011	A Gang Story	Writer	Olivier Marchal (5)	
2011	Le fils à Jo	The Chinese	Philippe Guillard	Also producer
2012	On se quitte plus	Toni Garreau / Manzor	Laurence Katrian	TV movie Also writer and producer
2013	Un p'tit gars de Ménilmontant	Jo	Alain Minier	
2013	Le jour attendra	Milan	Edgar Marie	
2013	Mae West	Bruno	Charles Guérin Surville	Short
2014	Mea Culpa	Writer	Fred Cavayé (2)	
2014	Fastlife	Jeno	Thomas N'Gijol	
2014	Belle comme la femme d'un autre	Gabriel Arnaudin	Catherine Castel	Also writer
2014	Borderline	Writer	Olivier Marchal (6)	TV movie
2014	Vaugand	Richard Vaugand	Charlotte Brandström & Manuel Boursinhac	TV series (3 episodes)
2016	Murders at Martinique	Paul Ventura	Philippe Niang	TV movie
2016	Mon frère bien-aimé	Etienne Leroy	Denis Malleval (3)	TV movie
2017	Carbon	Writer	Olivier Marchal (7)	
2018-	Les rivières pourpres (The Crimson Rivers)	Pierre Niemans	Ivan Fegyveres, Olivier Barma & Julius Berg	TV series
2020	Rogue City	Writer	Olivier Marchal (8)	
2020	La Promesse	Pierre Castaing	Anne Landois	TV series (6 episodes)

== Theater ==
Year	Title	Author	Director	Notes
1990	Uncle Vanya	Anton Chekhov	Catherine Brieux	
1994	Les Sincères	Pierre de Marivaux	C. Casanova	
1995	L'Auteur	Vincent Ravalec	C. Casanova (2)	
1997	Du riffoin dans les labours	Christian Dob	Christian Dob	
1997–98	Une nuit	Sacha Guitry	Christophe Luthringer & Jacques Décombe	
2000	Ladies Night	Anthony McCarten & Stephen Sinclair	Jean-Pierre Dravel & Olivier Macé	
2005–06	Sur un air de tango	Isabelle de Toledo	Isabelle de Toledo	Nominated - Molière Award for Best Newcomer
2011	Pluie d’enfer	Keith Huff	Benoît Lavigne	
2012	Rendez-vous au grand café	Daniel Glattauer	Alain Ganas	
