= Elite 2 =

Elite 2 may refer to:

- Beretta Elite II, an air pistol
- Élite 2 (rugby union), the second tier competition of women's rugby union in France
- Elite 2 (rugby league), the second tier semi-professional rugby league competition in France
- Elite Two, the second division of the Cameroon association football league system
- Frontier: Elite II, a space trading and combat simulator video game

== See also ==
- Elite (disambiguation)
