= Arminius (disambiguation) =

Arminius (18/17 BC – 19 AD) was a Germanic Cherusci chieftain.

Arminius may also refer to:

- Arminius (name), including a list of people with the name
- Arminius (Bruch), an 1877 oratorio by Max Bruch
- SMS Arminius, an ironclad warship of the Prussian Navy, 1865–1901
- Jacobus Arminius (1560–1609), Dutch Reformed theologian upon whose ideas Arminianism was built; a contrast to Calvinism.
- Arminius (journal) associated with the Conservative Revolution in the 1920s

== Other ==
- Arminius is a line of revolvers manufactured by Weihrauch of Germany.

== See also ==
- Arminius Hotel, a historic hotel in Portland, Oregon, United States
