= Umarex air pistol =

Air gun replicas of handguns manufactured by Umarex

Umarex air pistols are air gun replicas of handguns manufactured by Umarex Sportwaffen of Germany under license from the manufacturers of the original firearms.

They are imported into the United States by Umarex USA, Inc..

== Design ==
The replicas are operated by disposable carbon dioxide (CO_{2}) cartridges that fire .177 caliber airgun pellets or steel BBs. Depending on the model, they use removable 8-round or 10-round rotary clips, or regular magazines. For some revolver and lever-action rifles, drop-out magazines that eject from the bottom of the grip or shells also in use.

Disassembled H&K USP by Umarex Airguns.

== Models ==
=== Pellet pistols ===
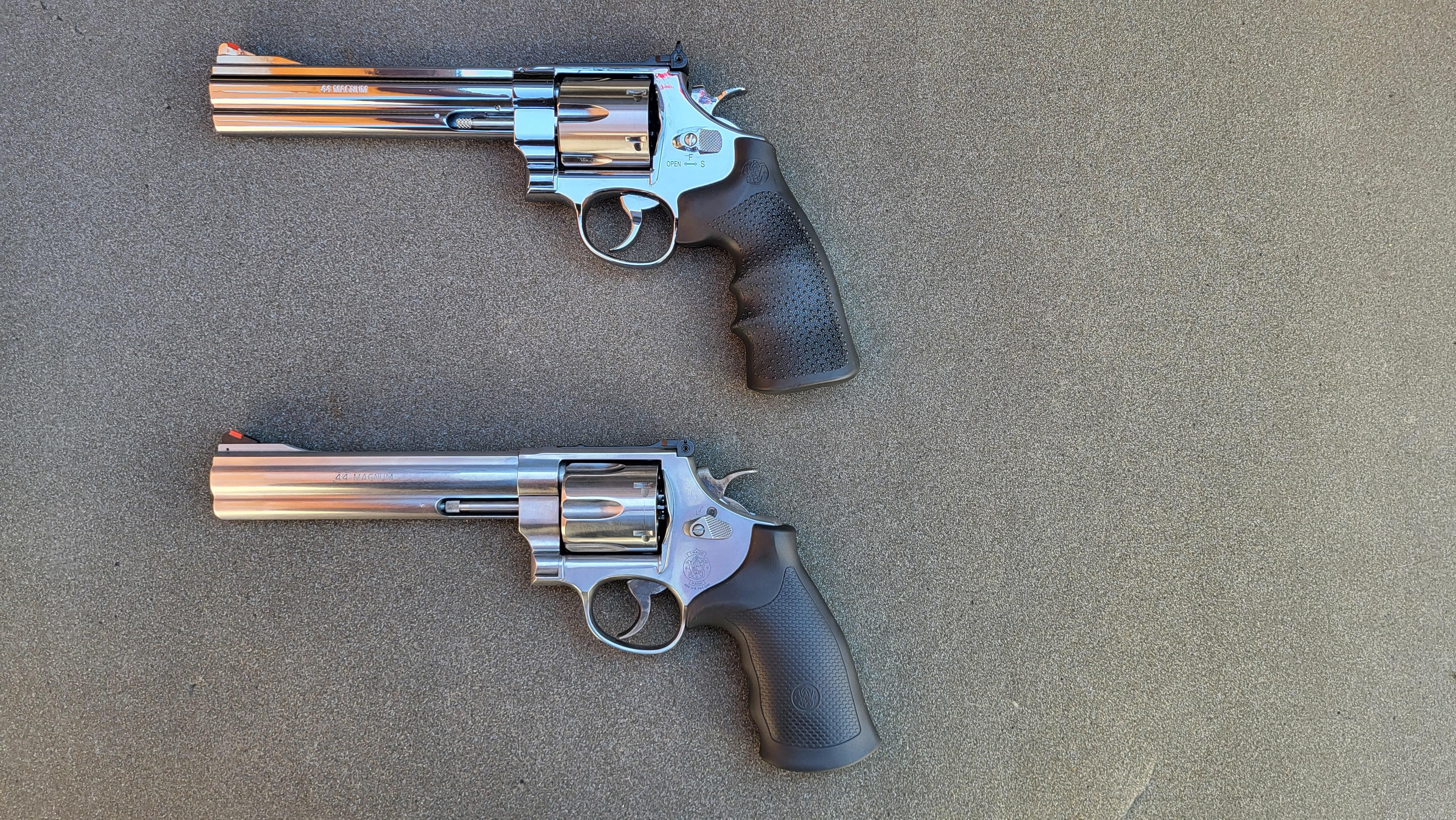
A Smith & Wesson 629 (bottom) and its Umarex replica (top).

- Walther CP 88, CP99
- Beretta (Beretta 92), Px4 Storm
- Colt (M1911)
- Smith & Wesson (586, features 10-shot magazine)
- Magnum Research, Inc (Desert Eagle, Blowback 8 shot)

=== BB pistols ===
- Walther CP99 Compact, PPK/S
- Colt M1911, SAA
- Magnum Research, Inc Baby (Mini) Desert Eagle
- Glock 17 Gen3, 17 Gen4, 19 Gen3, 19 Gen4
- Heckler & Koch VP9, USP
- Beretta Elite II, Px4 Storm, M84FS, M92 A1
- Smith & Wesson M&P (Military and Police)

== See also ==
- Air gun
