= Elite (disambiguation) =

The elite are a group or class deemed to be in some way superior.

Elite or ELITE may also refer to:

== Buildings ==
- Elite Tower, a skyscraper under construction in Ramat Gan, Israel
- Elite Towers, a partially built building complex in Dubai, United Arab Emirates

== Fonts and typefaces ==
- Prestige Elite, a typeface
- Elite, a 1969 font designed by Aldo Novarese
- Elite (type), a 12-pitch font for typewriters

== Literature ==
- The Elite (novel), a novel in the Selection series by Kiera Cass
- The Elite (DC Comics), a group of super-powered anti-heroes in DC Comics

== Military ==
- Elite forces, a military group holding substantial influence in the military sector

== Music ==
- Elite (album), an album by Within the Ruins
- "Elite", a song by Deftones from White Pony
- Elite (record producer) or Anthony Parrino, producer
- Tyshane or Elite, producer

== Products ==
- Beretta Elite II, an air pistol
- Elite Stratocaster, an electric guitar model
- Europa Elite a light aircraft
- Murphy Elite, a light aircraft
- Pioneer Elite, a line of high-end electronics
- E'Lite, a small-form-factor microcomputer

== Sports ==
- Elite SC, a football club in the Cayman Islands
- The Elite (professional wrestling), professional wrestling trio, later expanding into a stable
- Elitedivisionen, the highest-level league competition for women's football clubs in Denmark
- Elitettan, the second highest division of Swedish women's football.

== Television ==
- The Elite (audio drama), an audio drama based on the TV series Doctor Who
- Elite (TV series), a Netflix TV series

== Vehicles ==
- Ford Elite, a two-door coupe (1974–1976)
- Honda Elite, a series of scooters
- Lotus Elite, two vehicles from Lotus Cars
- Plaxton Elite, a bus coach body
- Elite, a German car brand (1913–1929) made by Elite-Werke of Brand-Erbisdorf

== Video gaming ==
- Elite (video game series), a space combat and trading video game series introduced in 1984
  - Elite (video game), first video game in the series
  - Frontier: Elite II, second video game in the series
  - Elite Dangerous, fourth video game in the series
- Elite Systems, a UK video game developer
- Xbox 360 Elite, a video game console from Microsoft
- Elite (Halo), a fictional alien race from the Halo series
- Call of Duty: Elite, a social networking service that supports games in Activision's Call of Duty franchise

== Other uses ==
- Elite (company), an Israeli food manufacturer and part of Strauss Group
- Elite (restaurant), a restaurant in Helsinki, Finland
- Elite Model Management, a modeling agency
- North–South Expressway Central Link or ELITE Highway, an expressway in Malaysia
- Early versus Late Intervention Trial with Estradiol (ELITE), a clinical trial
- Elite Police, a Punjab counter-terrorist police force

== See also ==
- Elite Force (disambiguation)
- Sleek the Elite (Paul Nakad; born 1975), Australian hip-hop artist and actor
- Leet, an alternative alphabet for English that is used on the Internet and by gamers
