= Korth Combat =

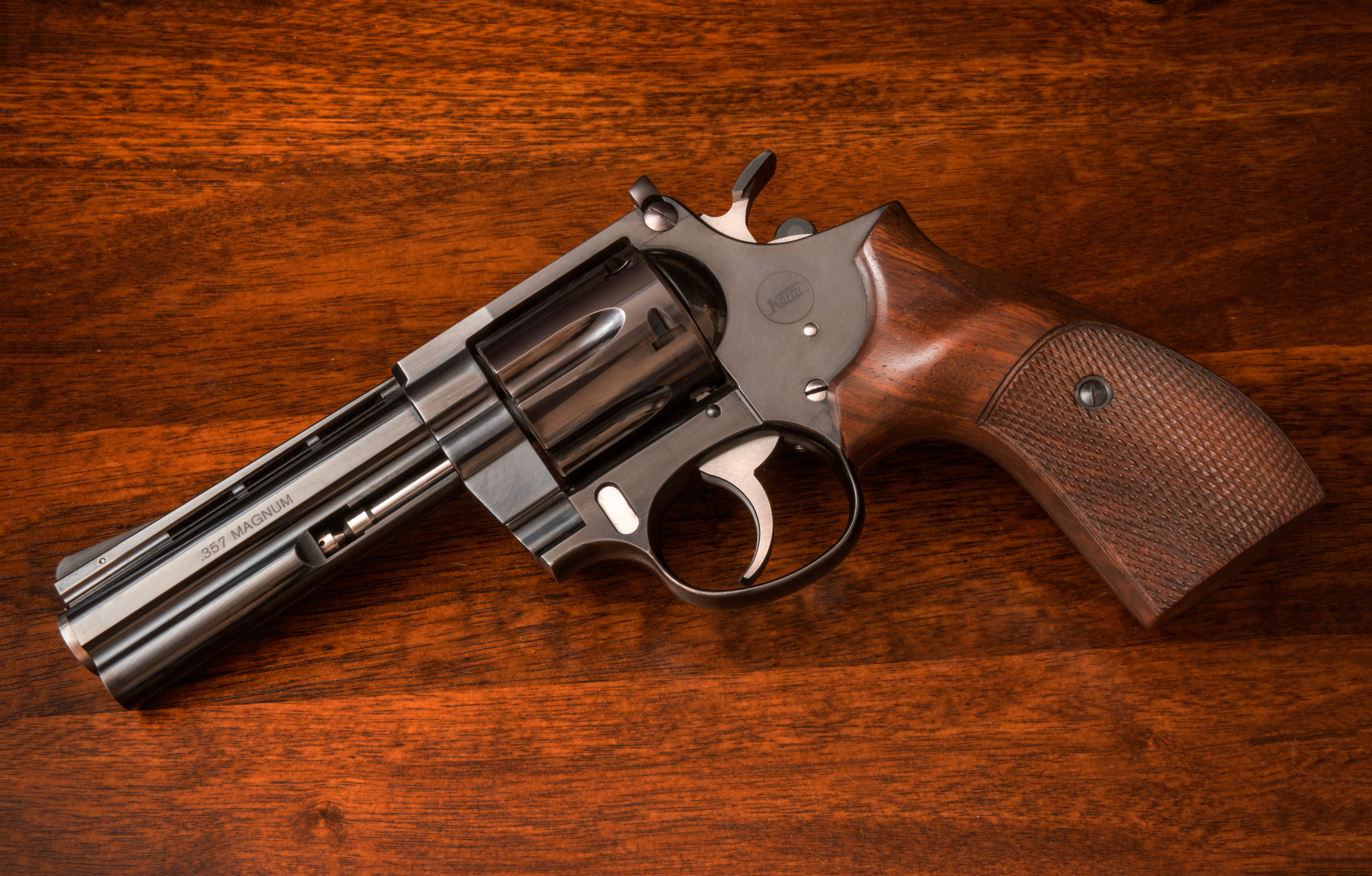
- Korth Combat .357 Magnum with 4 inches (101.6 mm) barrel
- Type: Revolver
- Place of origin: Germany

Production history
- Manufacturer: Korth GmbH

Specifications
- Mass: 40 oz (1,100 g) (4"barrel model)
- Length: 9.4 in (238.8 mm) (4"barrel model)
- Barrel length: 4 in (101.6 mm); 5.25 in (133.4 mm); 6 in (152.4 mm)
- Height: 5.75 in (146.1 mm)
- Cartridge: .357 Magnum, .38 Special; 9×19mm Parabellum.44 Magnum, .44 Special
- Caliber: .357 in (9.1 mm)
- Action: double-action
- Muzzle velocity: 734 ft/s (224 m/s) (.38); 1,300 ft/s (400 m/s) (.357)
- Feed system: 6-round cylinder
- Sights: Fixed

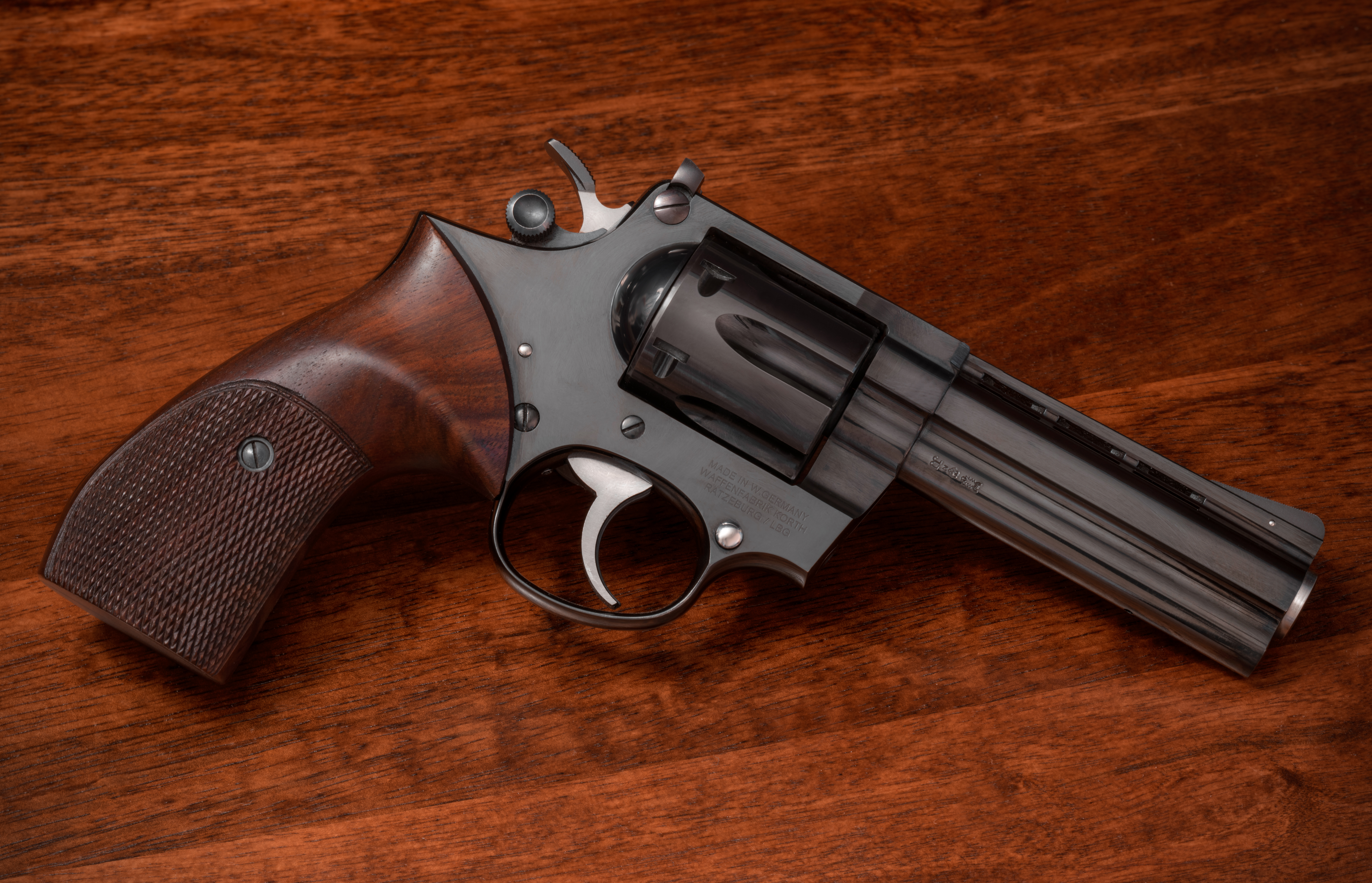
Korth Combat .357 Magnum with 4 inches (101.6 mm) barrel

The Korth Combat is a German high-end revolver manufactured by Korth GmbH, chambered in .357 Magnum.

== Design ==
Each revolver is custom-made, involving approximately 70% handwork and requiring four months to complete, with prices exceeding €3,300. A distinctive feature of the .357 Magnum/38 Special Korth revolvers is their user-changeable cylinder, available as an accessory. This allows the firing 9×19mm Parabellum ammunition once properly timed to the gun.

The Korth Combat also offers an adjustable trigger weight in both double-action and single-action modes, a feature shared by other premium revolvers such as those from Manurhin and Janz. These adjustments do not compromise the main spring's strength, ensuring reliable primer ignition. This is accomplished through the use of roller bearings in the trigger mechanism, combined with meticulous hand fitting and polishing of components during assembly.
