= Walther CP 88 =

Sport and training air pistol

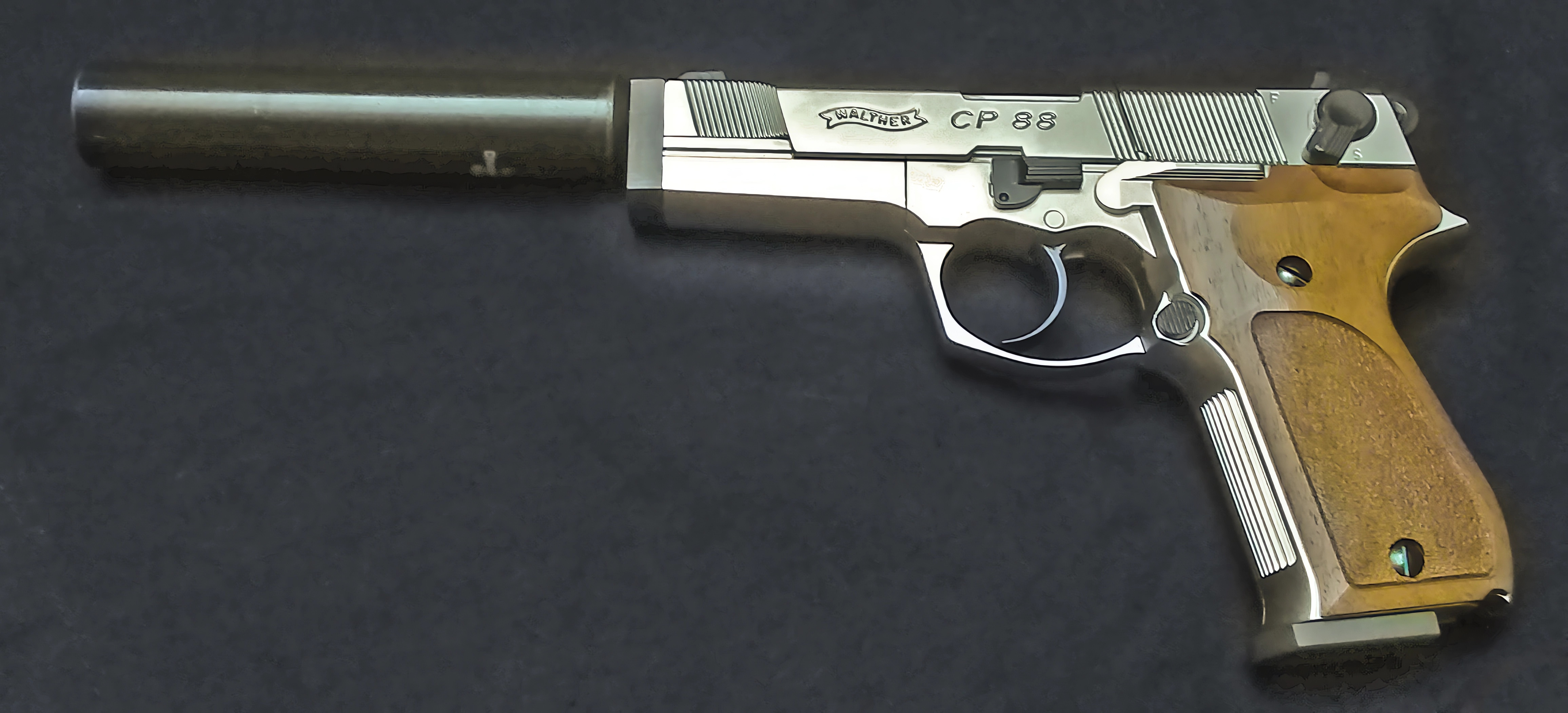
- CP 88 with silencer
- Type: CO_{2} pistol
- Place of origin: Germany

Production history
- Designer: Carl Walther GmbH
- Manufacturer: Umarex
- Variants: CP 88 "Competition"

Specifications
- Mass: 1040 g
- Length: 180 mm
- Cartridge: 4,5 mm (.177) Diabolo
- Action: Single action and Double action
- Muzzle velocity: 120 m/s
- Effective firing range: 20 m
- Feed system: 8-round cylinder
- Sights: Open sight

The Walther CP 88 is a sport and training pistol that shoots pellets using compressed CO_{2} according to the principle of an air gun. The design of the gun is borrowed from the widely used pistol Walther P88. It is manufactured by Umarex.

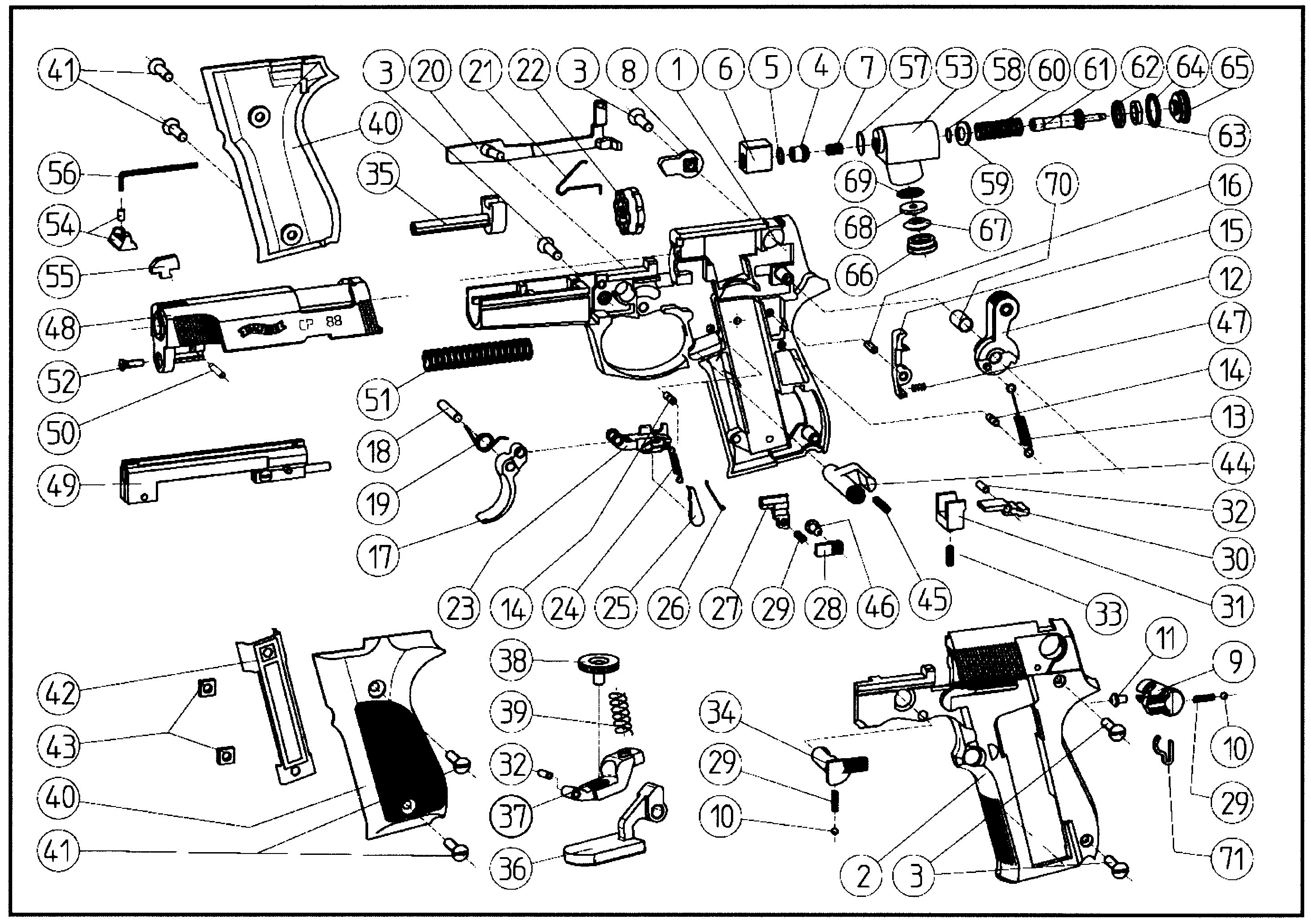
Exploded-view drawing of the Walther CP 88

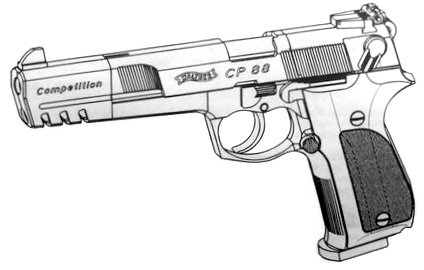
Walther CP 88 "Competition"

== Description ==
The CO_{2} is contained in a disposable gas cartridge of 12 grams, which is inserted into the handle of the weapon. As with most gas-powered weapons, 4.5 mm (.177) diabolo pellets are fired, which are stored in an 8-round cylinder (rotary magazine). For the so-called plinking (for example shooting at cans) steel core pellets can also be used, which are offered by some manufacturers in the required maximum length. In order to ensure that the cylinder functions properly, pellet lengths of no more than 6.9 mm (6.5 mm according to the manufacturer's specifications) are possible, as the height of the cylinder is 7 mm. The exit velocity of standard diabolos with a newly inserted CO_{2} cartridge is specified as 120 m/s ("Competition" as 130 m/s). This speed is continuously reduced because the gas pressure decreases after each shot. This is especially important when firing in quick succession, as this leads to a reduction in temperature in the weapon itself as well as in the CO_{2} cartridge, which reduces the muzzle velocity. At normal room temperatures, it should be possible to fire about 50 rounds with one CO_{2} cartridge without any loss of accuracy. The gun shoots precisely at a distance of up to about 20 m. Both the single-action and the double-action system can be used as triggers. The rotary magazine is invisibly located inside the gun, as the prototype is a semi-automatic pistol with a bar magazine and not a revolver. The magazine makes it possible in shooting competitions to carry out the discipline "rapid fire", in which the shooter has to fire a defined number of shots in quick succession.

Because the CP 88 is professionally equipped, it has a manually operated firing pin safety, a trigger safety when the bolt is open and an automatic drop safety.

The pistol is made of metal like its model and weighs 1040 g, in the "Competition" version 1150 g. Loaded and with a silencer attached, up to 1300 g or even more can be achieved. This high degree of similarity to the P88 offers the sports shooter a considerable level of realism for training shooting.

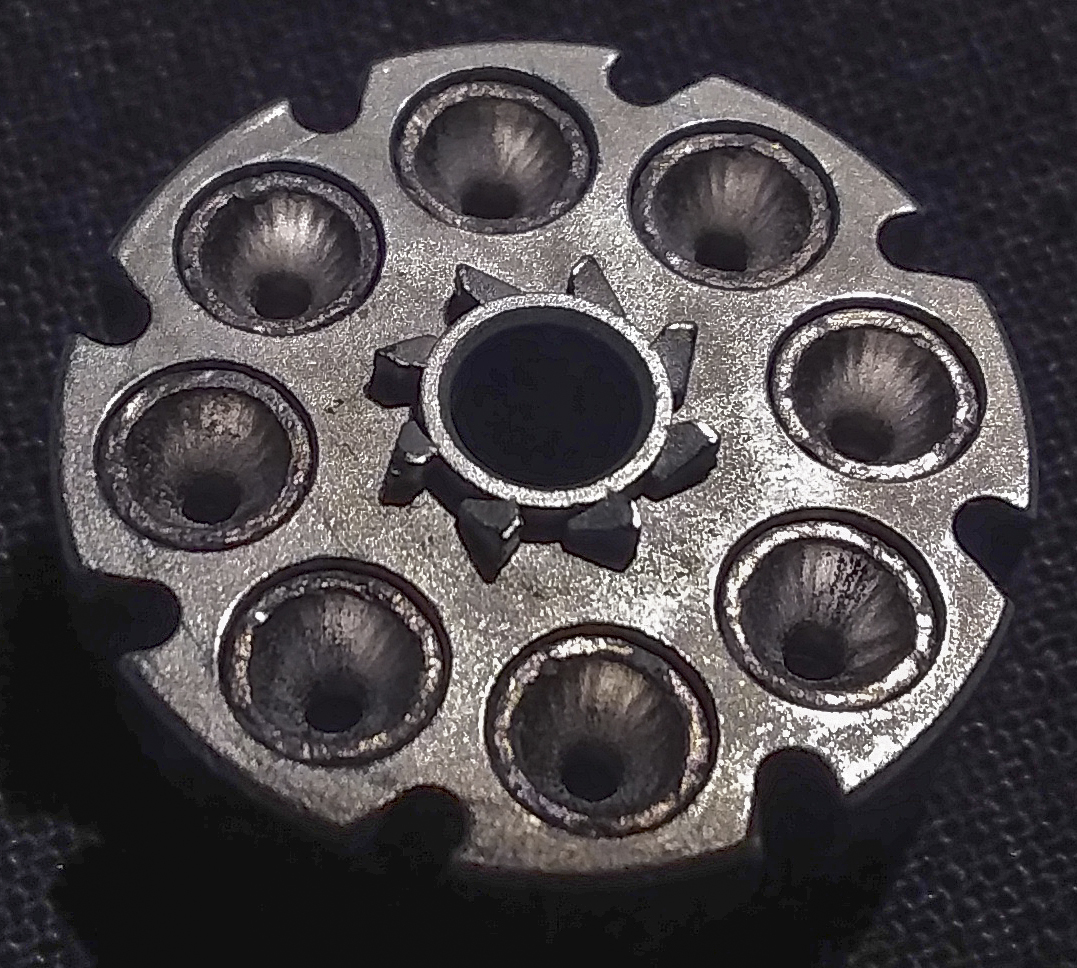
Rotary magazine for the CP 88 with inserted diabolo pellets

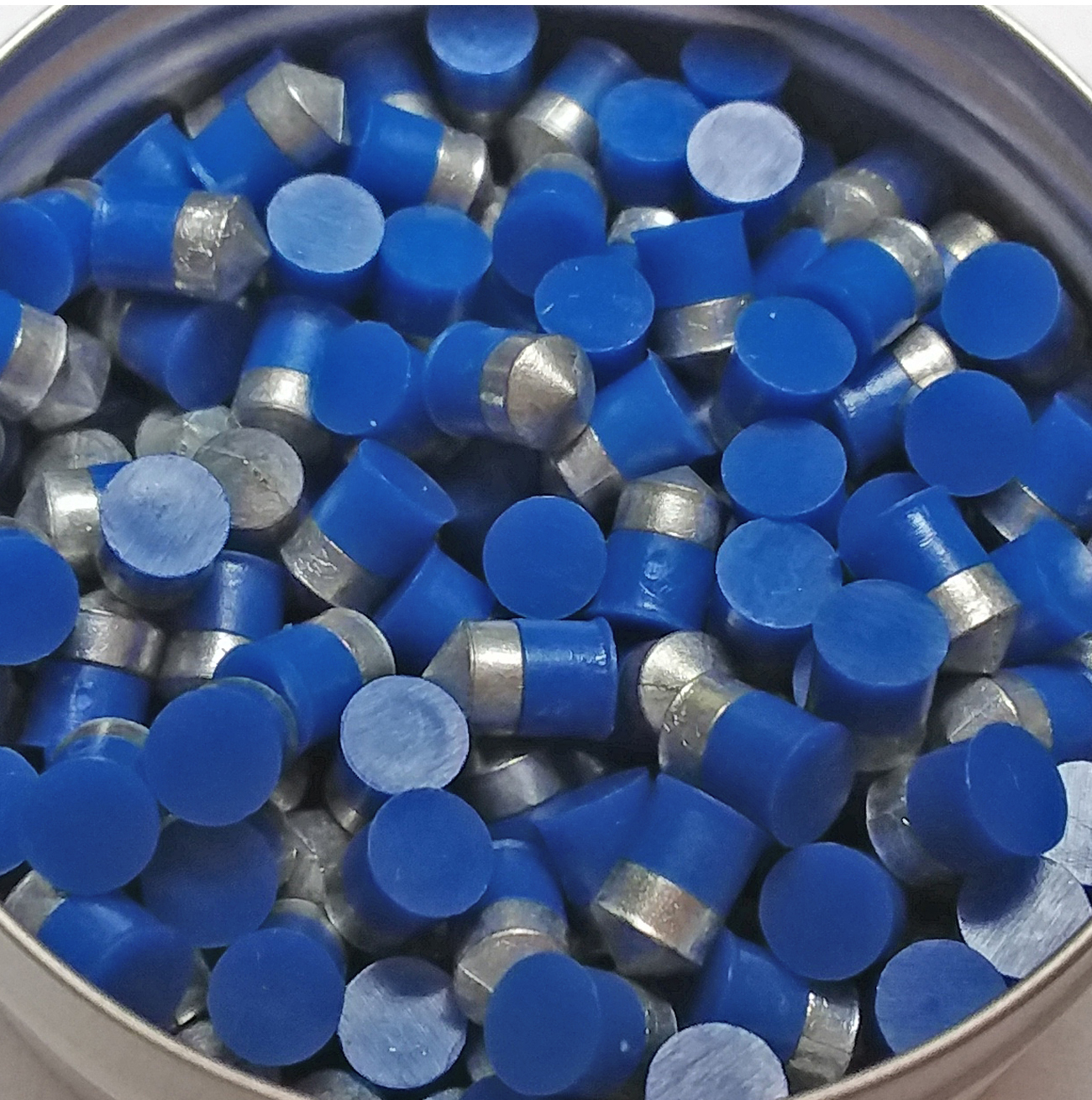
Steel core pellets (usable for plinking)

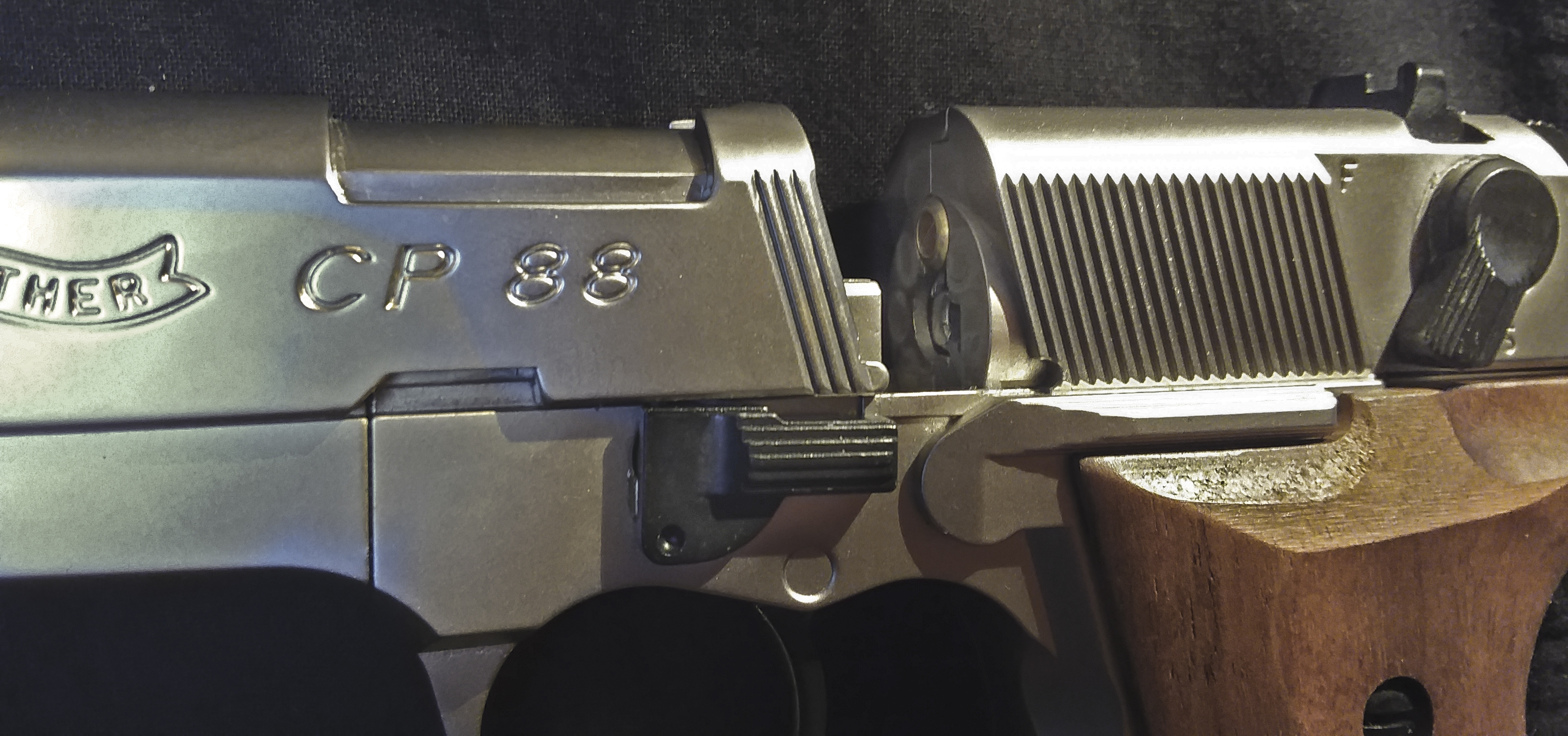
Opening for the cylinder

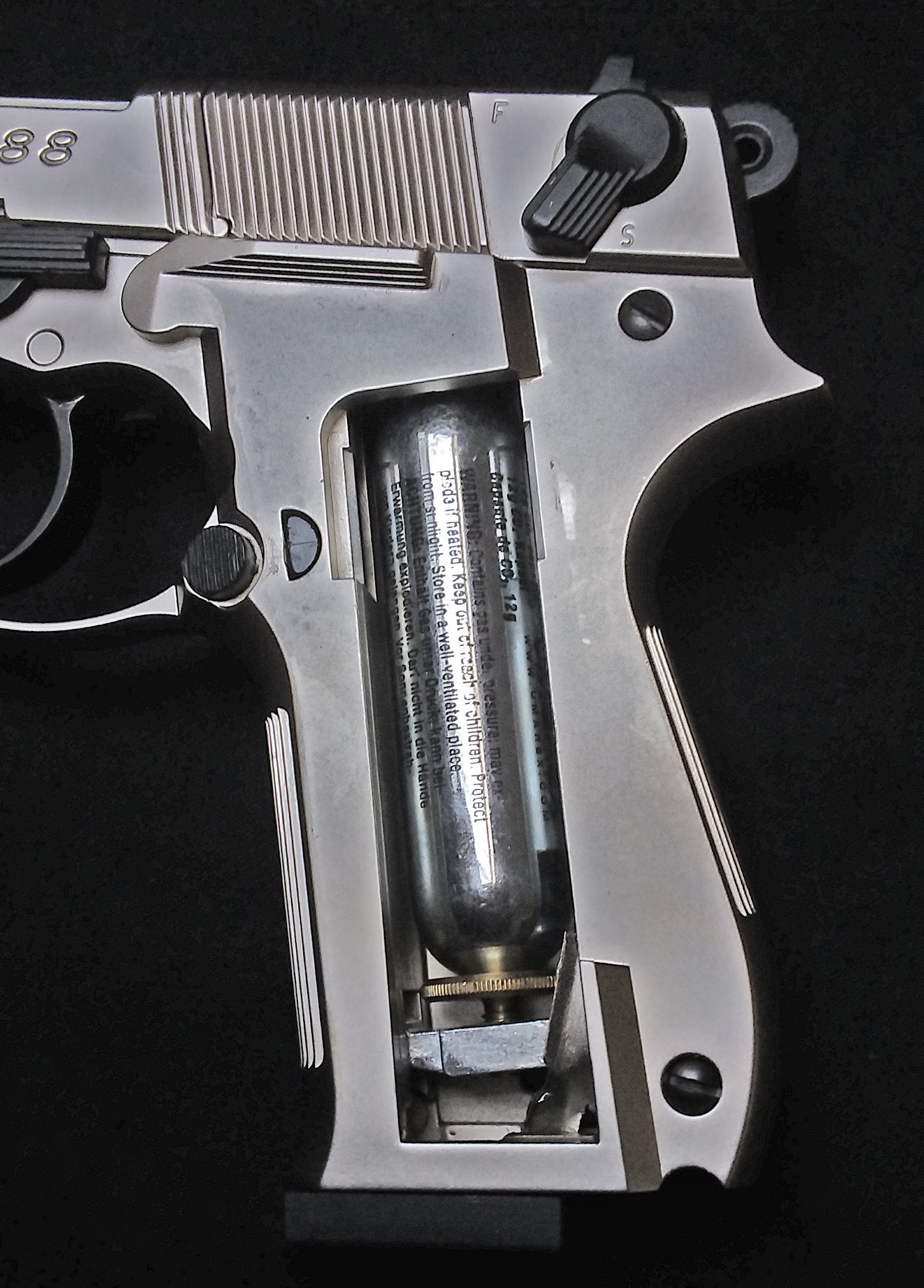
Handle with inserted CO_{2} gas cartridge

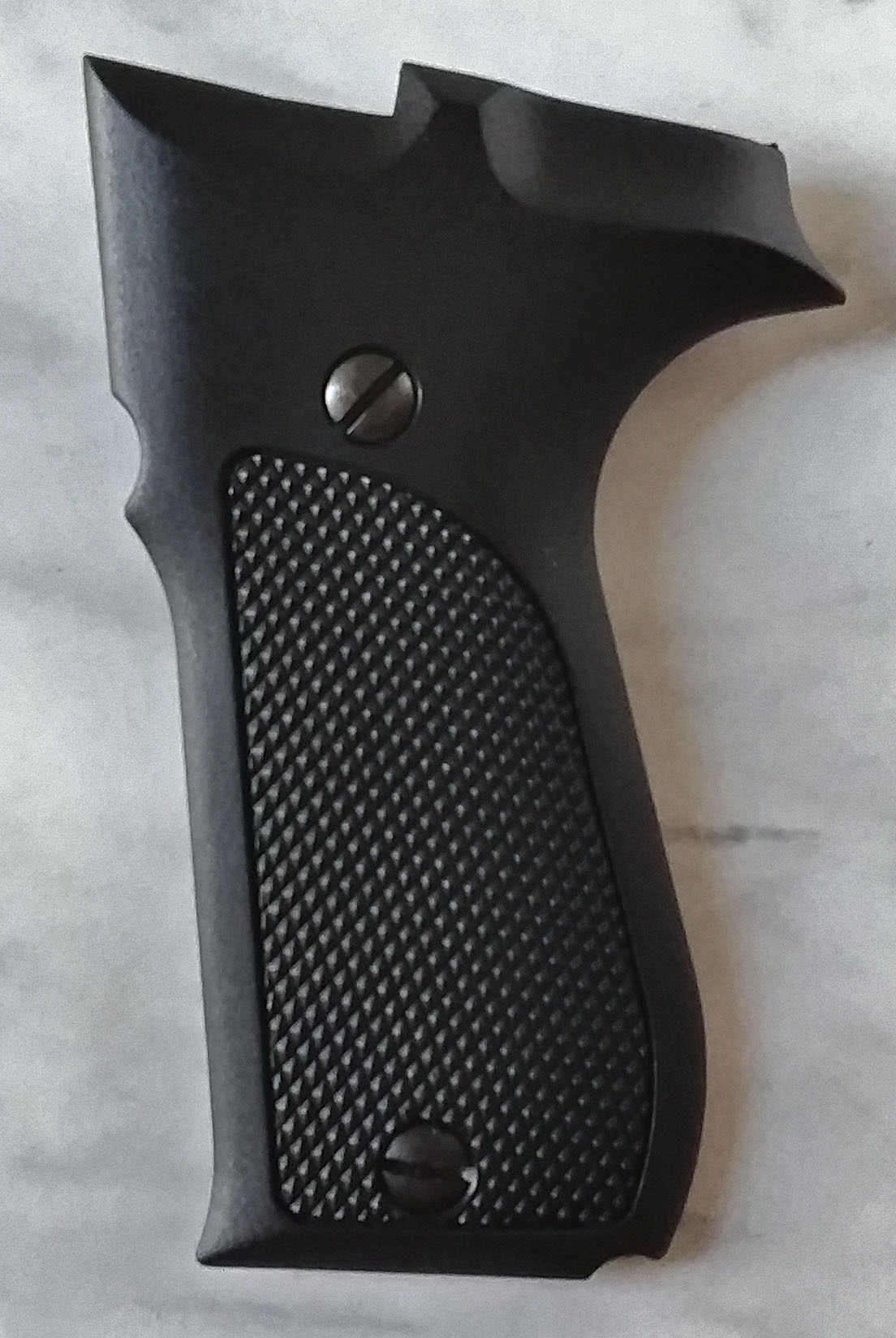
Standard plastic grip shell

== Accessories ==
With the aid of an adapter, the pistol can be equipped with a third-party silencer. Depending on the silencer, the noise level is reduced from just under 80 decibels to about 70 decibels. Depending on the type, the silencer makes it impossible to acquire a target through the attached open sight. In this case, the use of an illuminated dot sight via an adapter rail would be worth considering. A laterally adjustable, open sight is premounted as standard. This can be replaced by a height-adjustable visor, which is offered as an optional extra. As the CP 88 has an interchangeable barrel system, it is possible to replace the attached 4″ barrel with a 6″ barrel, which theoretically leads to even greater accuracy of the shot results. The name of the weapon, which is also available with a longer barrel at the factory, is then CP 88 "Competition".

The CP 88 is available in the versions "Polished Chrome", "Nickel" and "black burnished". In addition to plastic grip shells, the weapon can also be equipped with wooden grip shells.

== See also ==
- Umarex air pistol
