= Elite 1 =

Elite 1 may refer to:

- Elite 1, the top level rugby league competition in France from 2002 until 2024 when it was renamed as Super XIII
- Elite 1 (wheelchair rugby league), the top level wheelchair rugby league competition in France
- Elite One, the top division of association football in Cameroon
- Élite 1, the top division of women's rugby union in France

== See also ==
- Elite (video game)
- Elite (disambiguation)
