= RÖHM GmbH =

German chucking tool manufacturer

- Type: GmbH
- Industry: Manufacturing
- Founded: 1909
- Founder: Heinrich Röhm
- Headquarters: Sontheim/Brenz, Germany
- Area served: Worldwide
- Key people: Gerhard Glanz, CEO
- Products: chucking tools
- Number of employees: 1300
- Website: https://www.roehm.biz/en/

RÖHM is a German chucking tool manufacturer. It was founded in 1909 by Heinrich Röhm. Its headquarters is in Sontheim/Brenz, Germany. The company's products are especially for the automobile industry, engineering, the energy sector, rail vehicles and aerospace. From the 1950s until 2010, they also manufactured a line of inexpensive firearms under the Röhm Gesellschaft (RG) division. In 2010, RG was sold to Umarex.

== History ==
=== Foundation ===
RÖHM was founded in 1909 in Zella-Mehlis, Thuringia, by Heinrich Röhm. Its first product was a two-jaw drill chuck. In 1910 the first patent – improved drill chucks – was filed. Export business started the same year. Due to the influences of World War I production came to a standstill and resumption turned out to be difficult after the end of the war. In 1926, RÖHM started the production of key-type drill chucks. It was the first company in Germany to do so. The following years the manufacturing plants were modernized and extended. Between 1939 and 1940, a 40m conveyor belt for the production of drill chucks was put into service. Therefore, for the first time, a company produced precision tools in mass production and RÖHM was said to be the most modern and efficient factory of its industry.

=== World War II and reconstruction ===
In 1945, the company, which by then employed 1400 people, was occupied by the Americans and Heinrich Röhm was evacuated to Heidenheim an der Brenz with his family. The new rulers in East Germany occupied the intact factory and turned it into a nationally owned company. In 1946, the family moved to Sontheim/Brenz, where Heinrich Röhm decided at the age of 63 to reconstruct his company with the support of his sons. Without capital and without a plot of land the company was set up again from scratch. First of all, children's toys were made from plywood and wood waste in a leased carpentry. With the production of rock drills a change was made again to the business of metal machining. The same year, land was purchased and a barrack was constructed in order to reconstruct the RÖHM factory.

=== Internationalization and extension of production ===
With the foundation of the branch factory in Dillingen/Danube, it was possible to meet the constant increase in demand for products Made by RÖHM. During the following years, RÖHM extended its production capacity by 100 workplaces per year. In the mid-1950s, there was a trend towards power-operated systems. RÖHM therefore invested in the field of power chuck technology and allowed further growth. Foreign distribution and service establishments in England (1959), Denmark, Brazil, Switzerland (1960), Italy (1969), the USA (1978), France (1979) and Spain (1985) were founded. In 1980 the RÖHM site in St. Georgen was founded, especially for the field of clamping mandrels. In 1984 Günter Röhm took over the management of the RÖHM GmbH. Further activities abroad followed. The establishment in Great Britain became a one hundred percent subsidiary, the USA-establishment was renamed ROHM Products of America (RPA) and the Swiss establishment was taken over by the RÖHM GmbH.

=== Development after 1990 ===
The foundations of RÖHM Slovakia, RÖHM India and RÖHM WEIDA Machinery China (Joint Venture) took place in 2007. In 2008, after 99 years at the helm, the management of the RÖHM family business was passed to the external managing director. Due to the sale of the arms division to UMAREX, RÖHM henceforth concentrated on its core competencies. Today RÖHM employs 1500 people.

== Organizational structure ==
=== Sites ===
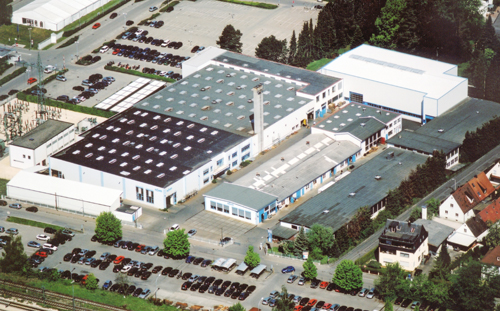
RÖHM Site in Dillingen/Danube

==== Sontheim ====
The reconstruction of the RÖHM factory took place in 1946 in Sontheim/Brenz. Since then, Sontheim is the company's headquarter.

==== Dillingen ====
The site in Dillingen/Danube was founded in 1953. The 1650 square meters production hall was constructed in 2007 and contains two turning and milling machines, which are adapted to RÖHM's special requirements. The machines enabled the processing of parts of up to four meters in diameter and 25 tons in weight. Due to a net weight of 108 tons the machine required a foundation of 180 tons of iron and steel. The Dillingen site mainly produces lathe chucks, machine vices and special clamping equipment for turning and milling machinery as well as for machining centres.

==== St. Georgen ====
The site was founded in 1980.

=== Manufacturing bases abroad ===
- ROHM INDIA PVT. LTD. (India)
- RÖHM SLOVAKIA S.R.O. (Slovakia)
- ROEHM WEIDA MACHINERY (Shangdong) Co.Ltd. (China) (Joint Venture)

=== Distribution and service establishments abroad ===
- RÖHM IND. E COM. DE FERRAMENTAS DE FIXAÇÃO LTDA. (Brazil)
- ROEHM China Co., Ltd. (China)
- RÖHM Værktoj A.S. (Denmark)
- RÖHM S.A.R.L. (France)
- ROHM (Great Britain) LTD. (Great Britain)
- RÖHM Italia S.R.L. (Italy)
- RÖHM Spanntechnik AG (Switzerland)
- RÖHM Iberica S.A. (Spain)
- ROHM Products of America (USA)

Additionally, there are more than 40 agents all over the world.

== Products ==
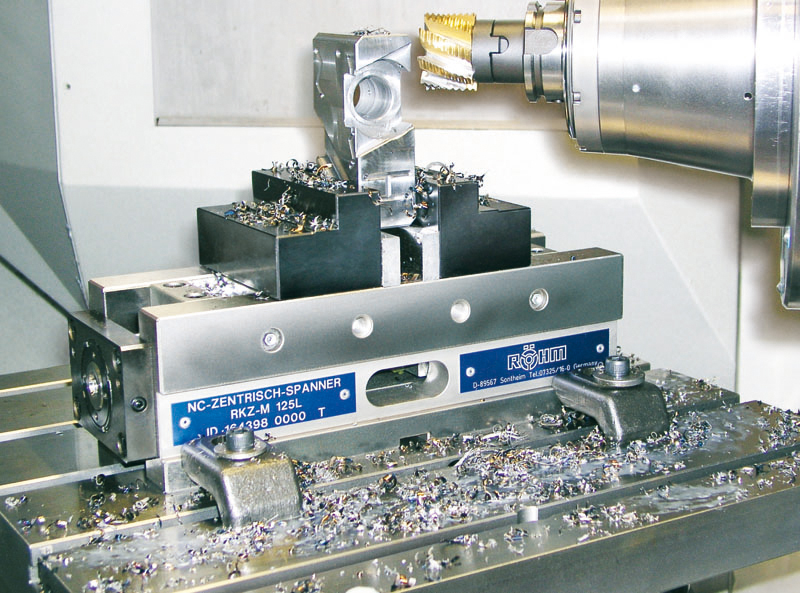
RÖHM NC vise

1970s RÖHM GmbH key-type drill chuck

- Drill chucks
- Live centers
- Face drivers
- Lathe chucks
- Independent chucks
- Vises
- Gripping technology
- Power chuck technology
- Mandrels
- Tool clamping systems

== Industries ==
RÖHM customers mainly include companies of the following industries:

- Automobile industry
- Engineering
- Energy sector
- rail vehicle
- Aerospace
- Automation technology
- Medical technology
- Trade and hardware stores

== Education ==
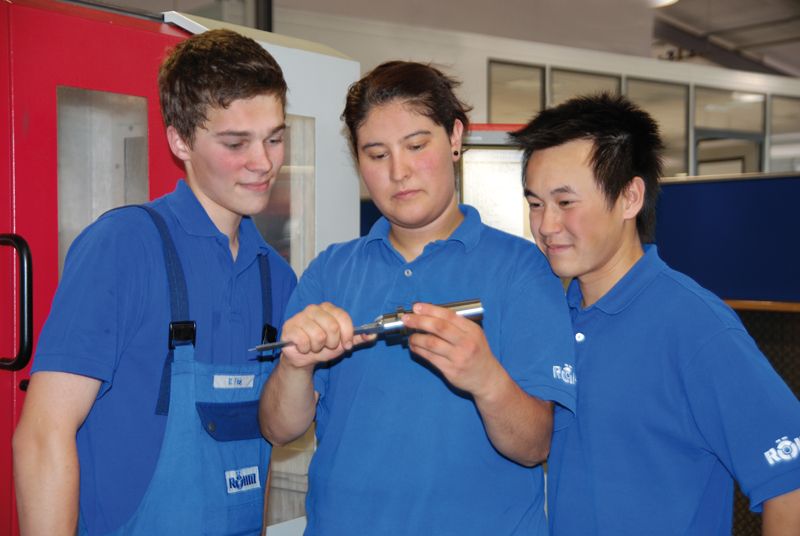
RÖHM Education

Every year, around 25 training positions are made available in the Sontheim and Dillingen/Danube plants. Apart from classic trade and technical professions, commercial training is also offered. Furthermore, it is also possible to achieve a high qualification by studying at the Baden-Wuerttemberg Cooperative State University.
