= Weihrauch HW45 =

Weihrauch HW 45
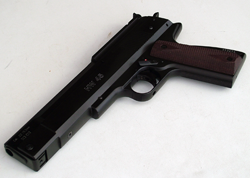
- Weihrauch HW 45
- Type: Air Pistol
- Place of origin: Germany

Production history
- Manufacturer: Weihrauch
- Variants: Bronze star; Silver Star; Black Star

Specifications
- Mass: 1.15 kg (2.54 lb)
- Length: 280mm
- Cartridge: .177/.20/.22 calibre Pellets
- Action: Overlever, spring powered
- Muzzle velocity: 557 ft/s (170 m/s) in 0.177
- Sights: Adjustable

The Weihrauch HW 45 is an air pistol manufactured by Weihrauch & Weihrauch in Germany and originally developed as a collaboration between American importer Robert Beeman and Weihrauch. It is more commonly known in North America as the Beeman P-1 after the US importers and is a large, full power air pistol with an ambidextrous grip, available in three different calibres: .177, .20 (as a special order) and .22. The HW 45 is suitable for informal target shooting and plinking.

== Specifications ==
- Weight: 1.15kg (2.54lbs)
- Cocking Effort: 8 kg (17.6 lb)
- Overall Length: 28cm (11inches)
- Barrel Length: 17cm (6.6inches)
- Muzzle energy: 5.1 ft•lbf (6.8 J)

== Details ==
The HW 45 is a spring powered, single-shot, air pistol with spring compression being achieved via an overarm cocking lever incorporating the barrel. The HW 45 features an adjustable two-stage trigger, fibre optic open sights and a grooved 11mm dovetail rail for mounting an optical sight. The pistol has a manual safety catch and comes in four different levels of finish with all but the basic HW45 having contoured wood laminate grips. Its design was based on the Colt Government, M1911 and the rear hammer acts as the release, for the overarm cocking lever

The .177 (4.5 mm) pistol has two power levels: low power is 410 ft/s (125 m/s) and full power 557 ft/s (170 m/s), dependent on weight of pellet. The different power levels are created by cocking the gun to different lock points.
