= Röhm Gesellschaft =

German brand of firearms and related equipment

- Company type: Private
- Industry: Arms industry
- Founded: 1950s
- Products: Firearms, weapons
- Owner: Umarex

Röhm Gesellschaft (RG) is a German brand of firearms and related shooting equipment. RG developed as a diversification of Röhm GmbH in the 1950s. After 1968, RG Industries was established as a US division in Miami and operated until 1986. In 2010, the RG brand was acquired by Umarex GmbH & Co. KG. Röhm's RG-14 handgun, used in an assassination attempt on then US President Ronald Reagan, was referred to in 1981 as a Saturday night special, a cheaply manufactured firearm of perceived low quality, believed at the time to be favored by criminals.

== History ==
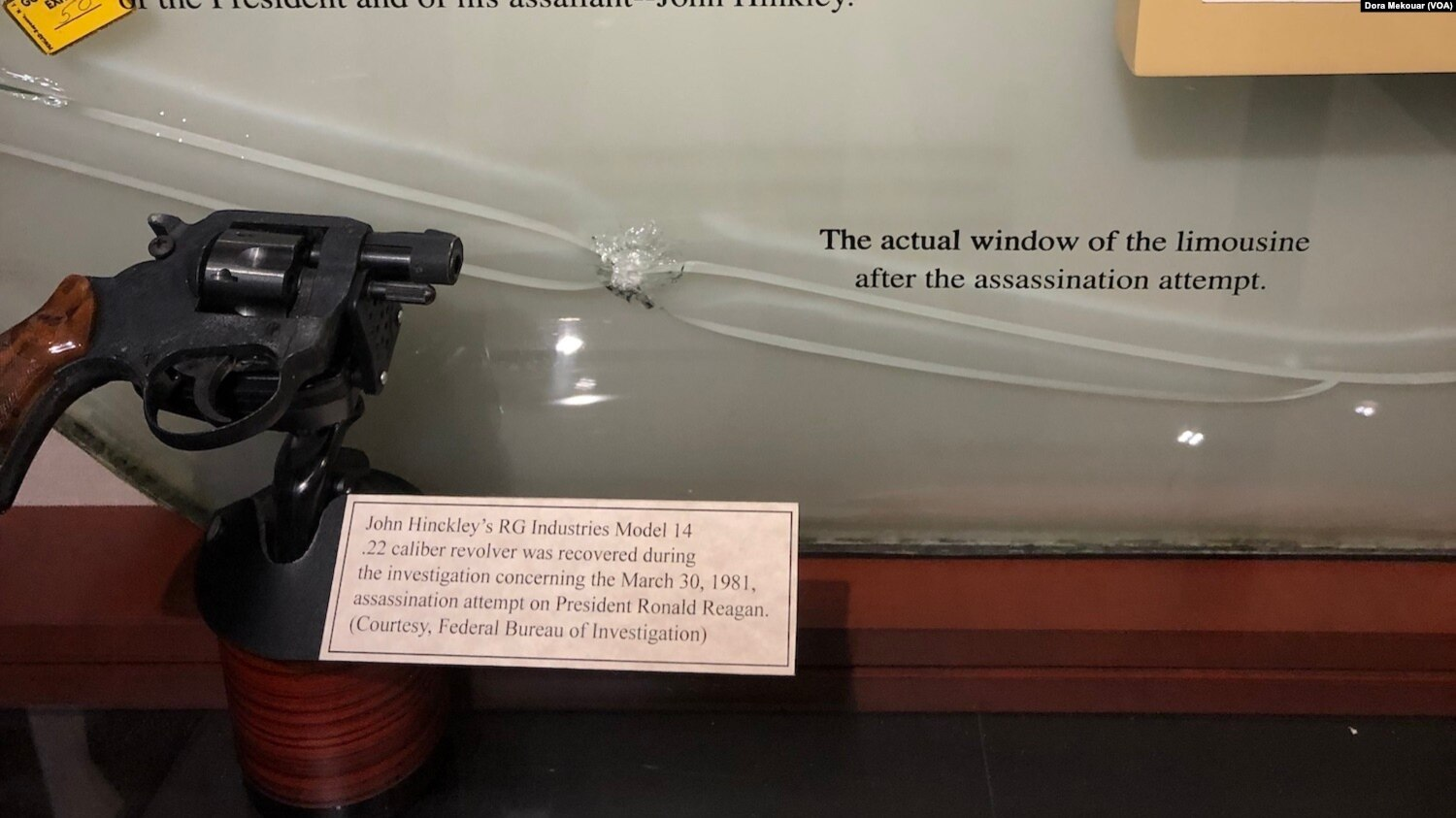
Röhm RG-14, used in the attempted assassination of Ronald Reagan in 1981. On display at the US Secret Services' restricted-access museum, 2022

In the early 1950s, Röhm GmbH of Sontheim/Brenz, which was traditionally focused on the production of chucking tools, diversified its product line and began to produce gas alarm guns, flare guns, starting pistols and handguns. Röhm's product line of firearms was primarily established under the brand name RG. Following importation limits imposed on handguns by the 1968 Gun Control Act, RG established a factory in Miami in the 1970s under the name RG Industries. The Miami factory produced revolvers, automatic pistols, and derringers in .22 LR, .25 ACP, .32 S&W, and .38 Special. The Miami factory ceased operations in 1986.

In 2010, Röhm GmbH sold their firearms manufacturing business to Umarex of Arnsberg.

== Litigation in the United States ==
Metropolitan Police Department of the District of Columbia police officer Thomas Delahanty was shot by John Hinckley Jr. with a Röhm revolver during his failed assassination attempt on President Ronald Reagan in 1981. Delahanty later sued Röhm, arguing that small, inexpensive guns serve no purpose except for crime, and thus that the company should be held responsible. The suit was subsequently rejected by the District of Columbia Court of Appeals in a suit that has served as case law for other similar product liability cases.

In 1985, Kelley vs. RG Industries was filed over a 1982 shooting in which Olen J. Kelley, a grocery clerk, was shot in the chest with an RG firearm.

== Firearms made by Röhm ==
=== Starting pistols ===
Starter pistols firing 6 mm Flobert blanks

- RG-2s
- RG-3s

=== Derringers ===
- RG-15
- RG-16
- RG-17

=== Revolvers ===
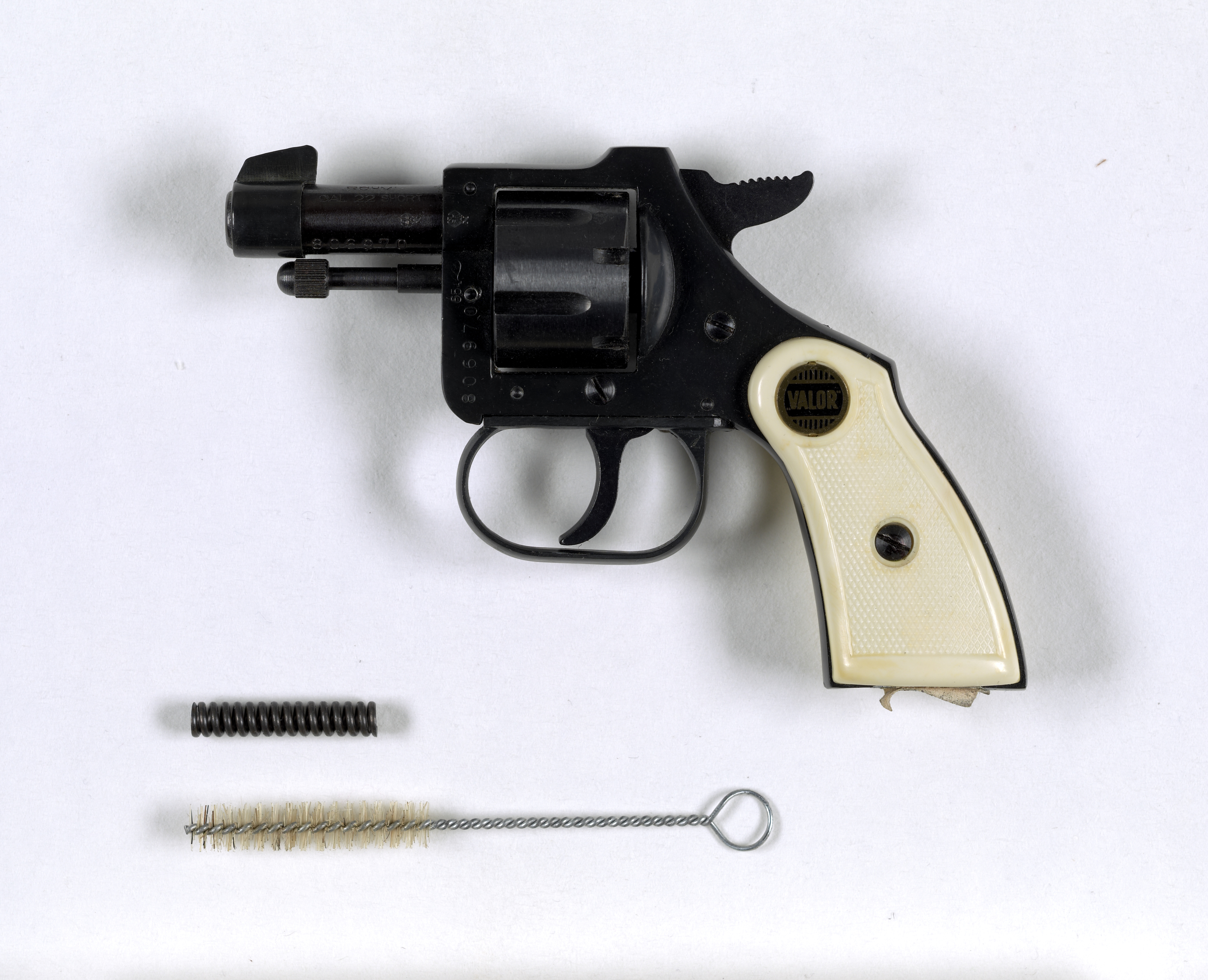
A Röhm .22 Short revolver, that was held in the records of the US Senate committee on Juvenile delinquency

- RG-7
- RG-10
- RG-14
- RG-23
- RG-30
- RG-31
- RG-35
- RG-38
- RG-39
- RG-40
- RG-57
- RG-63
- RG-66

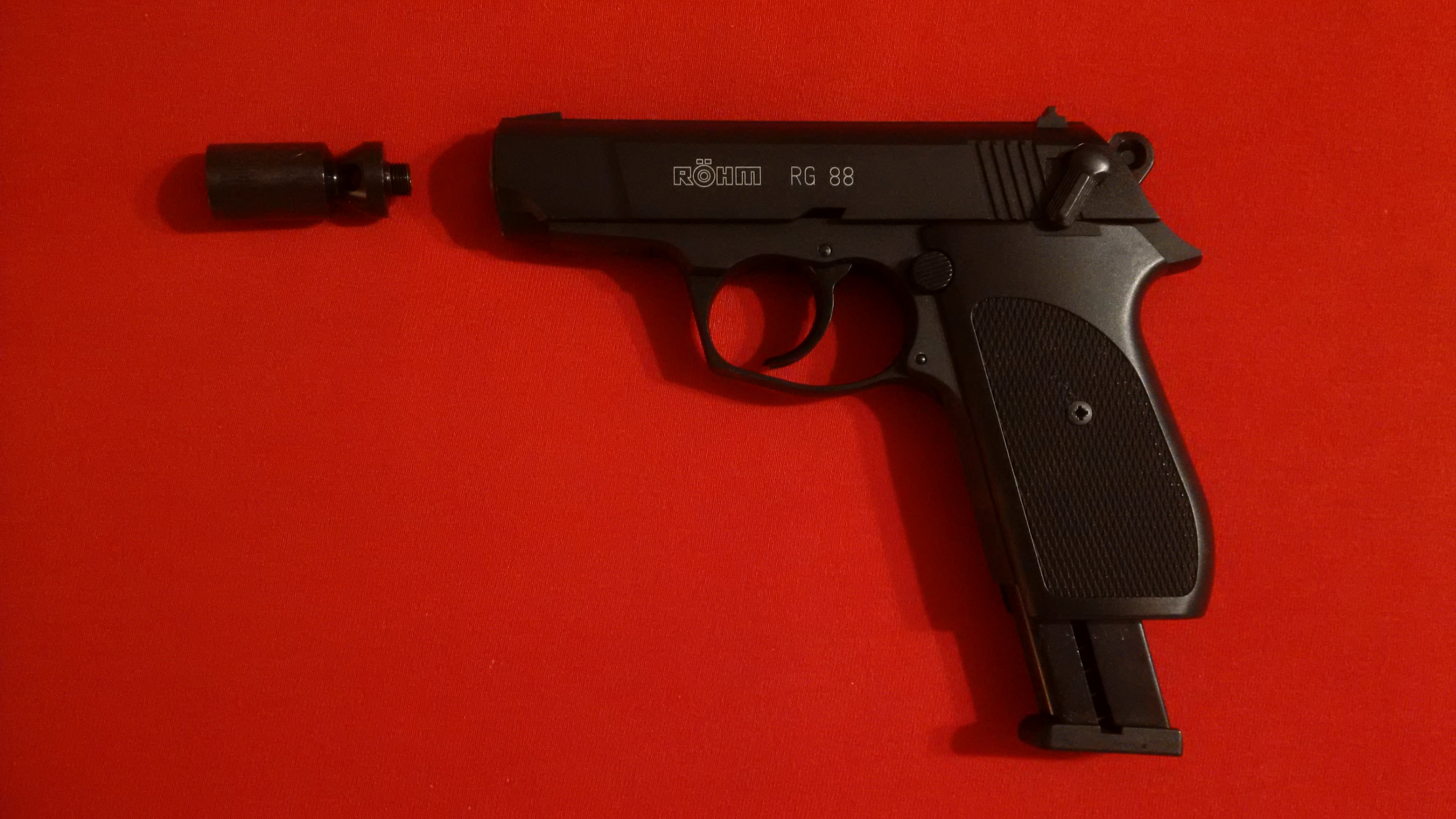
A Röhm RG-88 blank-firing pistol

=== Semi-automatic pistols ===
- RG-25
- RG-26
- RG-42

=== Blank firing pistols ===
- RG-46
- RG-88
- RG-96

== See also ==
Other German revolver brands:

- Arminius (revolvers)
- Janz (revolvers)
- Korth
