= Arminius (name) =

The name Arminius was identified as a Latinized form of the German name Hermann, possibly by Martin Luther. Hermann is also German for "Man of War", coming from the Old High German heri ("war"), and man ("man").

Notable persons with this name include:

- Arminius (18/17 BC –19 AD), Germanic Cherusci chieftain
- Arminius Vámbéry (1832–1913), Hungarian Turkologist and traveller
- Jacobus Arminius (1560–1609), Dutch theologian

== See also ==
- Arminius (disambiguation)
- Armin
