= Weihrauch HW 35 =

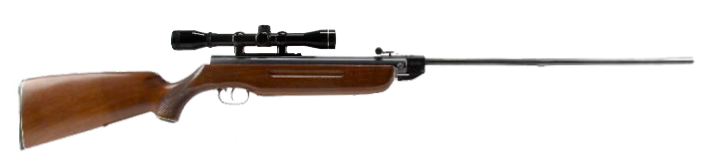
- Type: Air Rifle
- Place of origin: Germany

Production history
- Manufacturer: Weihrauch

Specifications
- Cartridge: 4.5mm (.177) / 5.5mm (.22) pellets
- Action: break barrel, spring powered
- Muzzle velocity: 4,5 mm 230 m/s - 5,5 mm 175 m/s
- Feed system: single air gun pellet
- Sights: Adjustable iron sight

The Weihrauch HW 35 is a break barrel, spring-powered, air rifle first produced in 1951 by Weihrauch & Weihrauch located in Mellrichstadt, Bavaria. Available in 4,5 mm and 5,5 mm calibers, with standard and carbine (K) length barrels, it has been in continuous production since its launch, even though the Weihrauch HW 80 superseded it in the late 1990s.

== Specifications ==
- Overall Length Standard: 1140mm - Carbine (K): 1050mm
- Barrel Length Standard: 500mm - Carbine (K) : 410mm
- Weight (without scope) 3,8 to 4,0 kg
- Velocity 4,5 mm 230 m/s - 5,5 mm 175 m/s

== Operation ==
The HW (Hermann Weihrauch) 35 was the first air rifle with Weihrauchs Rekord 2-stage trigger and is a conventional piston and spring mechanism. The spring is compressed by breaking the barrel through 125° before loading a pellet directly into the breech. Pulling back the barrel engages the automatic safety catch which pops out to the left rear of the cylinder. The barrel is then returned into place and secured with a breech-lock. The first production models had leather piston and breech seals with a 4mm diameter transfer port but at the end of the 1970s, from serial number #843636, Weihrauch switched to synthetic seals and a 2.8mm dia port.

The rifle has "blued steel" finish on the metalwork, a beech or walnut sporting stock with finger grooves in the forend, checkering on the pistol grip and a rubber recoil pad. The 35 has an articulated cocking link, an automatic safety catch, on all but the oldest models and most were fitted with sling swivels. The HW 35, being a spring-gun suffered with recoil and was quite noisy for an air rifle, range is limited to about 35m, with 20-25m being the maximum realistic hunting range as the rifle is designed to produce only around 10.5 ft•lbf (14.5 Joules) of muzzle energy.

Breech lock

The HW 35 has a locking breech latch to ensure barrel alignment after cocking. The lock extends from the left side of the breech block where the shooters thumb slides it forward during cocking.

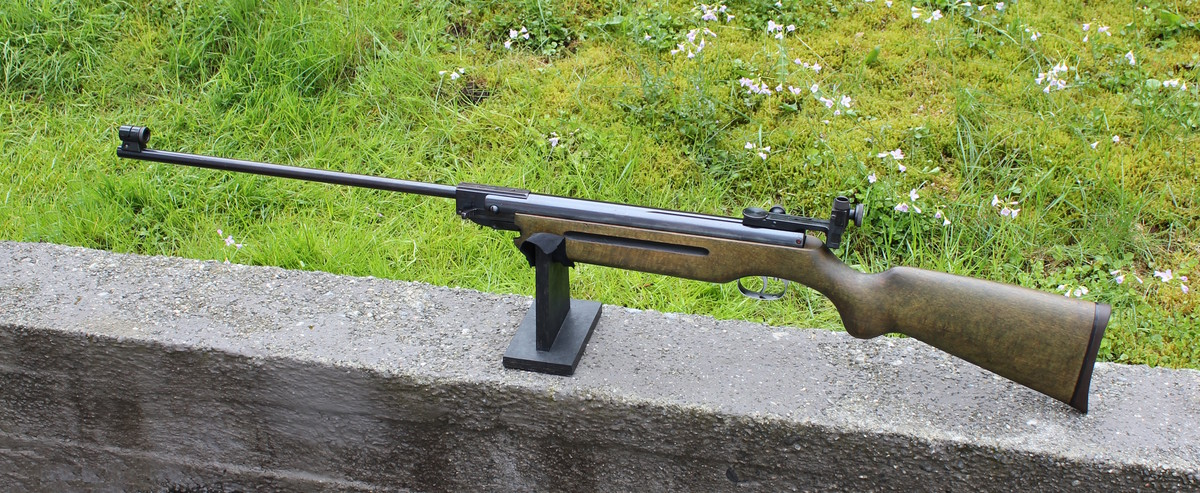
HW 35 with a diopter sight

Sights

The front iron sight is a globe with interchangeable inserts and the rear is a ramp style tangent, with a choice of four different shaped notches. At the rear of the action there's an 11 mm dovetail rail (older versions had 13mm) to mount a telescopic sight with two or three vertical holes for Weihrauch's own diopter target sight.

== Models ==
The internal actions on all 35s are identical and the rifle was originally available in three "custom" versions with varying degrees of aesthetics and three different lengths of barrel. The HW 35 STD (Standard) has a beech stock while the HW 35L (DeLux), walnut with a raised cheek piece. The top of the range is the HW 35E (Export) with a selected walnut stock, palm swell, rosewood pistol grip cap with a white line spacer and a 60mm longer barrel, later this version had a sound moderator. Both the Standard and the Deluxe were available as a "K" for Karabiner (Carbine) style with a shorter barrel.

As of 2024 there are just two versions still production; the HW35 and the HW35E. Weihrauch also changed the stock design in the current production versions by replacing the finger grooves of the forearm with checkering.

Limited Edition Models

In 1977 Weihrauch produced the HW 35LS (Lochschaft or Thumb-hole stock) version, then in 1986 the HW 35 Safari, an HW 35 standard with a green-tinged stock. Perhaps the most sought after by collectors is one of a limited run of 1000 .22 (5.5 mm) Jubilee 55 Edition (HW 35KLS Karbine Laminate Stock) to celebrate 55 years of continuous production of the HW 35 in 2006. This model had a screw cut barrel with a sound moderator, a blue laminate stock, the action was engraved "Jubilee 55" in gold and came without open sights.

Weihrauch also produces the HW 35 STL (Stainless Steel Look) with a black synthetic stock and nickel-plated action from around 2004. Some gunsmiths and importers switch the actions from STL's with other HW 35 variants and market HW 35 STL's with Walnut stocks and traditionally blued actions with black synthetic stocks.

HW 35 Edition 75

Introduced in 2026 to mark the rifle's 75th anniversary in a limited run of 600. The Edition 75 had an oiled walnut stock without cheekpiece, a round checkered pistol grip, a finger groove in the forestock, an anniversary sling, engraving and a gold-plated trigger. Weihrauch subsequently introduced an unlimited 1950s Retro Edition with the same general specification but not limited or numbered.

The HW 35 Vixen

Between 1979 and 1981, Norman May of Bridlington produced a tuned version for the UK market. The rifle had a chromed mainspring, piston, guide tube, breech lock with 'VIXEN' engraved on the right of the barrel block and a gun bag with the Vixen badge. In 1979 an HW 35E Vixen cost £170 when a standard HW 35 cost £57 and the Vixen was not a commercial success.

== See also ==
- List of air guns
