= Korth =

German high-end handgun manufacturer

PTW KORTH Technologies GmbH
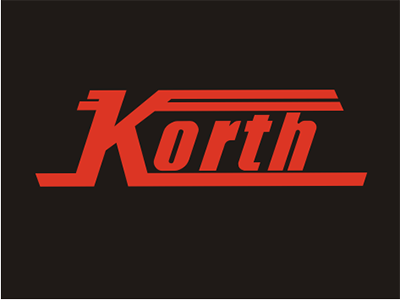
- Type: GmbH
- Industry: Firearm
- Founded: 1954; 72 years ago
- Founder: Willi Korth
- Headquarters: Lollar, Germany
- Area served: Worldwide
- Key people: Martin Rothmann (CEO)
- Products: Firearms
- Number of employees: 25
- Website: kortharms.com/en

Korth is a high-end firearms manufacturer based in Lollar, Hesse, Germany. Their high-end revolvers cost over €3,300 and their semi-automatic pistols cost over €4,500.

== History ==
The company was founded in 1954 by Willi Korth, a railway engineer, who began his business in a basement workshop making gas revolvers able to fire blanks or tear gas cartridges.

Later on, production of firearms began. In 1982, Willi Korth retired from the management of the company and sold it. However, he remained loyal to the company for a short time as production manager.

In 1999, the company, which was owned by Bernstorff at the time, had to file for bankruptcy. The company, which had around 30 employees at the time, was broken up as a result of this bankruptcy. Since April 2000, Korth has been owned by Armurerie Freylinger & Cie., Luxembourg, and in 2001 expanded into the American market by establishing a branch in the United States. According to an announcement by Korth GmbH in November 2008, Korth was closing its factory. This information was announced, among other things, through an advertisement in the specialist journal DWJ. On April 22, 2009, the company moved its headquarters to Lollar near Gießen and, according to its own statements, would resume production there with Martin Rothmann as its CEO.

== Firearms ==
=== Revolvers ===
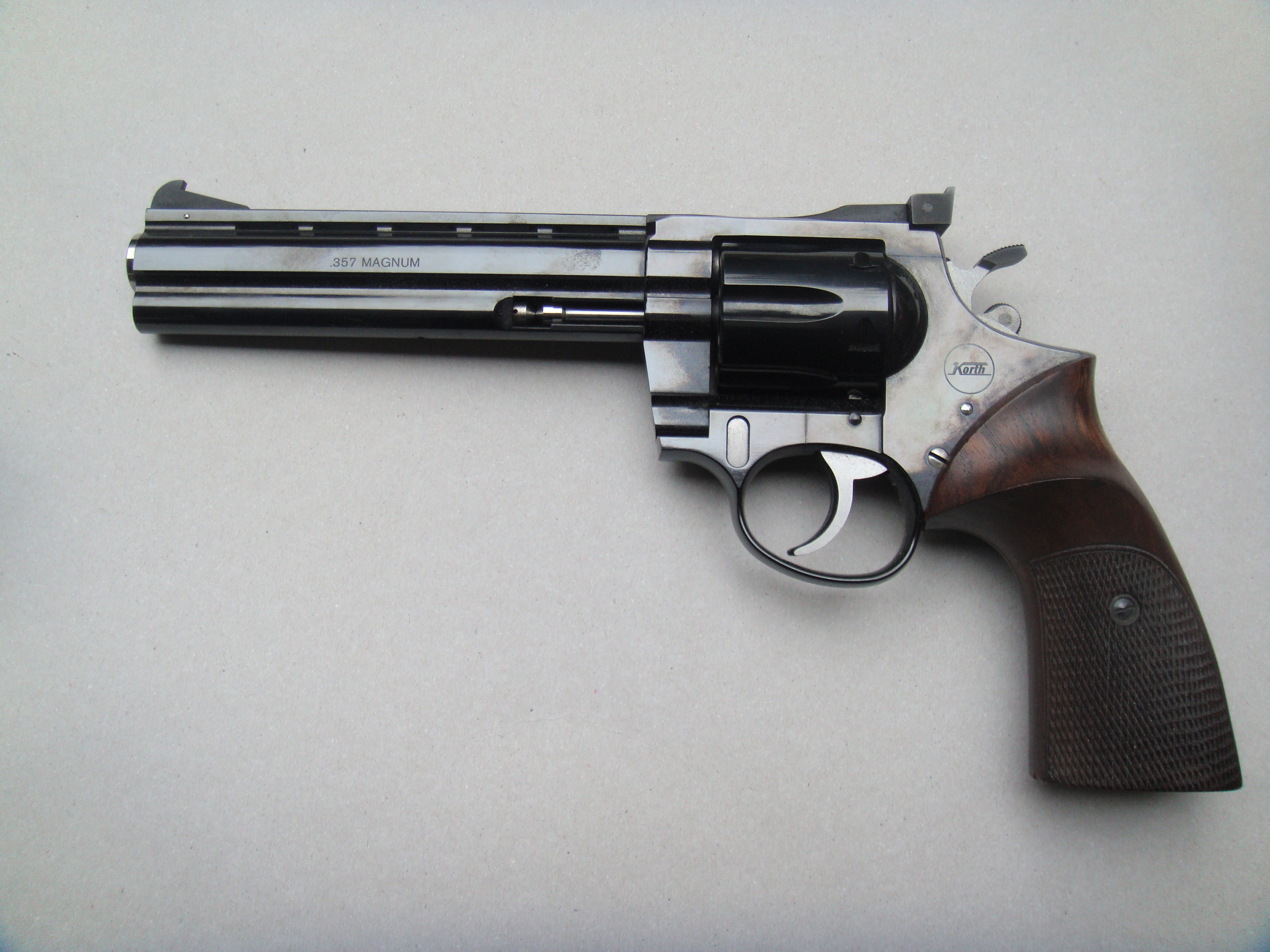
Korth Sport .357 Magnum with 6 inches (152.4 mm) barrel and fully adjustable rear sight

Each revolver is custom-made involving about 70 percent manual labor and four months time. A rare feature of .357 Magnum/.38 Special Korth revolvers is a user toolless changeable cylinder, sold as an accessory, enabling firing 9×19mm Parabellum ammunition after being correctly timed to the gun.

- Korth Combat
- Korth Ranger
- Korth Sport
- Korth Target
- Korth NXR
- Korth NXS

=== Semi-automatic pistol ===
- Korth PRS

== See also ==
- Janz, a German premium revolver manufacturer
- Arminius, another German revolver manufacturer
- Röhm/RG, a defunct German revolver and handgun manufacturer
