= Weihrauch HW 77 =

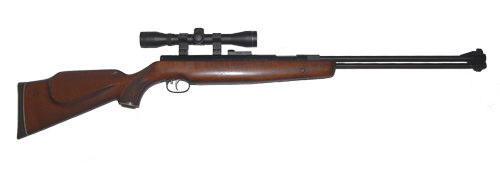
- An early-model Weihrauch HW 77
- Type: Air Rifle
- Place of origin: Germany

Production history
- Manufacturer: Weihrauch
- Produced: 1983 to Present
- Variants: ‘’HW 77 K” (Carbine), ’'HW 77 SE and HW 77 K-SE" (Special Edition)

Specifications
- Mass: 9.04 lb (4,100 g)
- Length: 44.09" (Carbine model 40.12")
- Cartridge: .177 (4.5mm), .20 (5.0mm), .22 (5.5mm) & .25 (6.35mm) caliber waisted diabolo pellets
- Action: Underlever cocking
- Muzzle velocity: approx. 290 m/s
- Feed system: manual
- Sights: Open sights, with dovetail grooves for riflescope mounting

The Weihrauch HW 77 (HW for Hermann Weihrauch) is an underlever-cocked, spring-piston air rifle developed and manufactured by the German sporting weapons manufacturer Weihrauch. Renowned for its accuracy, the HW 77 is widely considered the most successful underlever air rifle ever made. It is also known for its rugged construction, considerable weight and precision adjustable trigger. The gun was marketed and sold as the Beeman HW 77 in the American market.

== Current variants ==
- "HW 77" (Full-length rifle, 470mm barrel length)
- "HW 77 K" (Carbine, 370mm barrel length)
- "HW 77 and HW 77 K Special Edition" (Brown/green/black laminated wood stock)

The main variant of the HW 77 is the HW 77 K carbine. The K signifies ‘Kurz’ which is the German word for 'Short'. The HW 77 K weighs approximately 100 grams less than the full-length rifle, and overall length is 100mm shorter. As of December 2020, Special Edition versions are sold with a brown/green/black laminated stock.

== Marketing ==
Being one of the products of a joint venture between Weihrauch and the Beeman Airgun Company, the HW 77 and HW 77 K were sold in the USA as the Beeman HW 77 and HW 77 K. Following the acquisition of Beeman Airguns by SR Industries, the rifles were marketed in the USA as the Marksman 60 and Marksman 61.

== Model evolution ==
Since its inception in 1984, the HW 77 has been the subject of numerous minor improvements and upgrades. HW 77 models are frequently classed into three progressive 'Marks' by owners and enthusiasts; however, these classifications are not officially used by Weihrauch.

=== Launch version ===
Released in approximately January 1984.

- Two scope-mount arrestor-pin holes in rear of receiver tube.
- Cocking lever retained by a sprung ball bearing that is part of the underlever catch block.
- Front open sight and underlever catch block are a single casting; front sight blade not removable.

=== First evolution ===
Released in approximately October 1985.

- Three scope-mount arrestor-pin holes in rear of receiver tube.
- Cocking lever retained by a sliding catch on the underside of the underlever catch block.
- Front open sight now removable from underlever catch block.
- Anti-bear trap feature introduced.
- 26mm compression tube introduced as a running change. Serial numbers prior to 1446049 have 25mm compression tube, later models have 26mm tube.

=== Second evolution ===
- Three scope-mount arrestor-pin holes in rear of receiver tube.
- Cocking lever retained by a push-button catch on the underlever catch block, and a ball bearing that is part of the cocking lever.
- Sporter stock redesigned with a curved 'Schnabel'-type foreend and raised rectangular cheekpiece.

== See also ==
- Air gun
