= Umarex =

German arms manufacturer

UMAREX GmbH & Co. KG
- Industry: Arms industry
- Founded: 1972; 54 years ago
- Headquarters: Arnsberg, Germany
- Products: Air guns Airsoft guns Firearms; Paintball markers
- Brands: RAM; Umarex; Tactical Force
- Revenue: €221.6 million (2021)
- Subsidiaries: Walther Arms; Röhm Gesellschaft; Umarex USA

UMAREX GmbH & Co. KG is a German manufacturer of air guns (including Umarex air pistols such as the Beretta Elite II), tear-gas and signal pistols, paintball markers under the RAM brand and airsoft guns, based in Arnsberg, North Rhine-Westphalia. The firm was founded in 1972.

In 1993 the Carl Walther GmbH firm was acquired by Umarex, who continued to manufacture under the Walther name in Ulm and Arnsberg. In 2010, Röhm Gesellschaft, the firearms division of Röhm GmbH was also acquired.

== Umarex USA ==
The North American subsidiary of Umarex, Umarex USA, was created in 2006 after acquiring the American marketers of the RWS brand (formerly part of Dynamit Nobel), which they continue to market. Umarex USA markets Umarex airguns in addition to many other airguns under license from various firearm brands that include Beretta, Browning, Colt, Hammerli, HK, Makarov, Ruger, Smith & Wesson, UZI, Walther and Glock. Umarex USA entered the tactical rimfire market in 2009 with the importation of Walther-made Colt M4 and M16 .22 LR guns. The company has in-house brands including entry and mid-level airsoft guns in their Tactical Force and Combat Zone brands, while reserving their Elite Force brand for premium airsoft guns. The Legends line is based on historical guns in a BB or pellet airgun format. In late 2010, the company began offering a Turkish-made M1911A1 chambered in .45 ACP under the Regent brand.

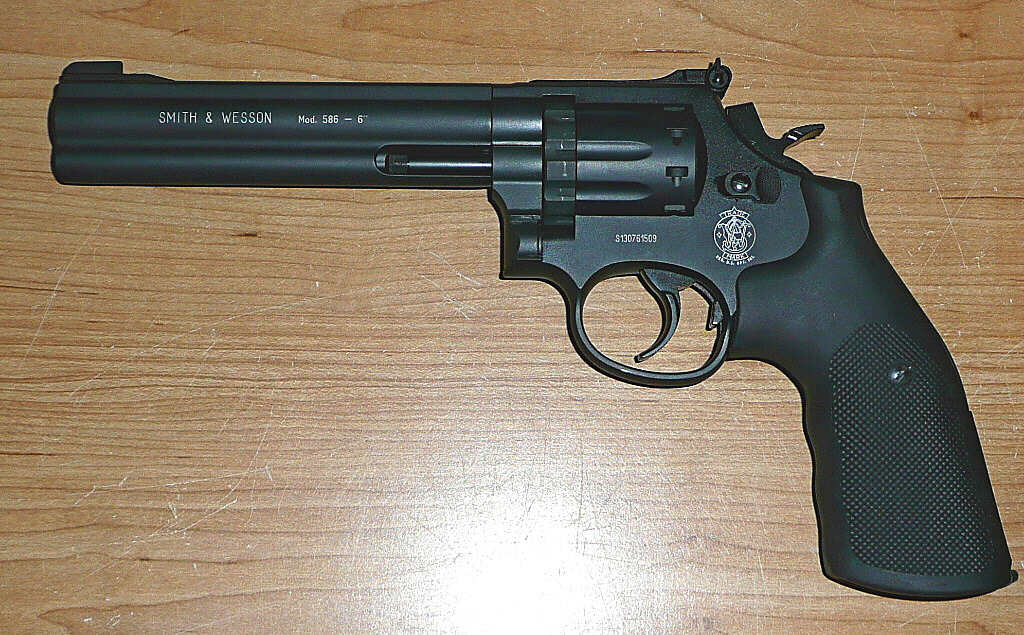
Umarex Smith & Wesson 586 pellet revolver 6 inch barrel

== Products ==
=== UMAREX GmbH & Co. KG ===
==== Spring piston ====
- DX17
- Trevox
- Patrol
- Syrix
- Browning Buck Mark URX

==== Pump pneumatic ====
- Strike Point

==== CO_{2} ====
Pistol

- CPS
- RP5
- TDP45
- HPP
- SA10
- Racegun
- Tornado

Rifle

- 850 M2
- Ruger 10/22
- XBG

==== Firearms - Pistol ====
- FN 502

=== Umarex USA ===
==== Pistol ====
- Strike Point
- Trevox
- XBG Carbine
- DX17
- T.A.C.
- TDP45
- XBG
- Brodax
- MCP
- SA10
- Glock 19x
- Glock 17
- S&W .357 Magnum
- Beretta M9
- Walther PPQ
- Markpoint

==== Rifle ====
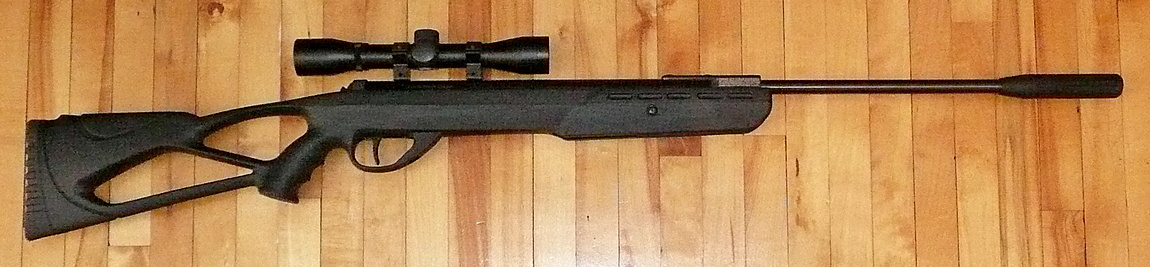
Umarex SurgeMax Combo .177

- A-Rex
- Embark
- Forge
- Fuel
- Fusion
- Gauntlet
- Gauntlet 2
- Hammer
- NXG APX (sold under Ruger)
- Octane/Octane Elite
- Surge
- SurgeMax
- Synergis/Synergis Elite
- Throttle
- Torq
- Fusion 2
- HK416
