= Janz (revolvers) =

German revolver manufacturer

Janz (Revolvers)
- Company type: GmbH
- Industry: Firearms
- Founded: 1997; 29 years ago
- Founder: Uwe Janz & Rene Janz
- Headquarters: Bad Malente, Holstein, Germany
- Area served: Worldwide
- Key people: Julia Janz - Managing Director
- Products: Firearms
- Website: www.janz-revolver.de

Janz is a line of premium (costing up to 25,000 Euros), low volume (less than one hundred per year) revolvers manufactured by Janz-Präzisionstechnik GmbH, of Bad Malente, Holstein, Germany.

== History ==
Janz-Präzisionstechnik GmbH originally produced a number of parts for the company Korth-Ratzeburg. In the 1990s Korth was bankrupt and production ceased, prompting Janz to start manufacturing revolvers under their own brand in 1997, utilizing frames and parts produced for Korth.

== Current products ==
=== Revolver ===
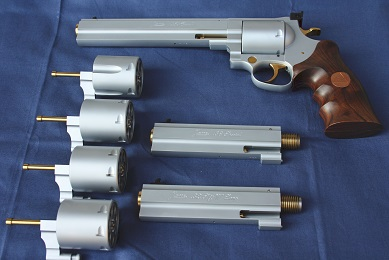
Interchangeable revolver system

- EM frame - Small frame in calibers from .22 lr to .44 MAG with barrel lengths from 2 1/2 inches to 12 inches. Available with a quick change system.
- E frame - Medium framed from .22 lr to .454 Casull with barrel lengths from 2 1/2 inches to 12 inches. Available with a quick change system.
- MA frame - Large frame in .460 and .500 S+W with barrel lengths from 4" to 12"
- Type S and EM-S Medium and Small frames with a common frame which can use various interchangeable barrels (2½ to 12 inches) and various caliber cylinders.
- Sport revolvers, in either .357 or .44 magnum, equipped with adjustable sights.

=== Semiautomatics ===
Janz also produces a 9 mm semiautomatic as the Janz-Schuknecht Pistole.

== See also ==
Other German revolver brands:

- Korth
- Arminius
- Röhm (defunct)
