= Weihrauch =

German gun manufacturer

Weihrauch & Weihrauch GmbH & Co. KG
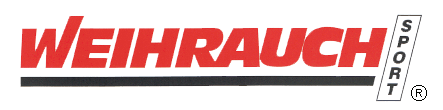
- Industry: Gun manufacturer
- Founded: Zella-Mehlis, Germany 1899
- Founder: Hermann Weihrauch, Sr
- Headquarters: Mellrichstadt, Germany
- Products: Air Rifles, Air Pistols, Firearms
- Website: http://www.weihrauch-sport.de

Weihrauch & Weihrauch GmbH & Co. KG is a German manufacturer of target and sporting air rifles, air pistols, cartridge rifles and pistols. In North America, they are often distributed under the Beeman brand name.

== History ==
The Hermann Weihrauch company was founded in 1899, by Hermann Weihrauch, Sr. His three sons, Otto, Werner, and Hermann, Jr., soon joined the company. Several new models were introduced after World War I, including the HWZ 21 smallbore rifle (HWZ stands for Hermann Weihrauch, Zella-Mehlis). This was the first mass-produced German .22 rimfire rifle and soon developed an excellent match record. They also produced double and triple barrel shotguns, over and under shotguns, and large bore hunting rifles.

In 1928, Weihrauch began international sale of bicycle parts and mechanical door closers. During World War II, Weihrauch continued production of spare parts for bicycles. Otto Weihrauch became a mechanic and later a gunsmith in Zella-Mehlis. Werner worked at Jagdwaffenwerk (Hunting Weapon Factory) in nearby Suhl. Hermann Weihrauch, Jr. moved to the little German village of Mellrichstadt in Bavaria. Here, he started the company again, mainly producing spare parts for bicycles.

Weihrauch made their first air rifle, the HW Model 50V in 1950. This airgun had a smooth bore because of Allied Occupation Government rules. Finally, after the German Shooting Federation ("Deutscher Schützenbund") was re-established, the allied government allowed the production of rifled barrels. However, because they were not allowed to produce firearms, they put their efforts into making sporting airguns. Even after the firearm manufacturing ban was withdrawn, the Hermann Weihrauch KG company continued to produce air rifles. The smaller HW 25 was made for the youth market while versions of the HW 30 and HW 50 continued as solid mid-market air rifles. The HW 55 was one of Europe's leading barrel-cocking target rifles.

In 1951 Weihrauch introduced a full size sporting air rifle, the HW35 which was to become their most successful model and was the first to feature the famous Rekord two stage sporting trigger developed from the target trigger of the HW55T, a trigger design that remains across the range unchanged to this day. The HW35 also has a locking barrel catch and an automatic safety located at the rear of the cylinder.

The Rekord two stage trigger was first used at some point in the 1950s, likely around 1955, on either the HW 35 or HW 55. Both of these models were originally made with non-Rekord triggers, labelled as "Burgo".

After Hermann Weihrauch, Jr. died in 1967, the company passed to Hans Weihrauch, Sr. The company celebrated 1970 with the introduction of the HW 70 air pistol. The company had begun plans, and first production, of a repeating air pistol before World War II, but the war aborted its regular production. Although pre-war HWZ sales literature shows an illustration of that thirty-shot top-lever spring piston air pistol, only one specimen of that HWZ LP-1 air pistol is now known.

The close connection between the owners of the Weihrauch company and Beeman Precision Airguns led to an early joint venture between a German-based manufacturer and an American airgun distributor. After a period of importing Weihrauch-designed airguns, the Beemans had decided that they needed to introduce a German-made air rifle with American styling and features. They had determined that their main need for the American market, in addition to new styling, was an increase in power. They had been very impressed with the quality of the long running HW 35, but puzzled by its power, which was lower than that of the Feinwerkbau Model 124, for which Beeman had developed a large market in the U.S.

Based on their computer simulation studies, the Beemans proposed a rework of the HW 35. This cooperative development program resulted in the Beeman R1 (sold outside of the US as the Weihrauch HW 80 in a lower-power version with a more European-style stock). Due to delivery problems with the longer, more complex R1 stock, the first HW 80 rifles were available some weeks earlier than the R1. This led to the incorrect conclusion made by some that the R1 was a copy of the HW80.

Almost the same thing happened with the introduction of the next Weihrauch air pistol, the HW 45 (sold in the US as the Beeman P1). Although the Beemans provided the full specifications and design features of this pistol, there was an initial misunderstanding about the external appearance. The factory presented a rather bulky, high top, "Desert Eagle-like" design which the Beemans did not think would appeal to the American market.

Weihrauch then produced an under-lever spring piston rifle, the HW77. This gun opened fully for loading directly into the breech of the barrel, like a Feinwerkbau match rifle. This was a great improvement over under lever air rifles which utilized a loading tap from which the pellet had to leap into the barrel. The HW77 and HW77 Carbine, with their rigid barrel and easy cocking and loading, became extremely popular in countries with lower power limits.

The field-style air rifle designs for the American market were a great success because a large majority of adult aigun shooters were involved in field shooting, as opposed to competition or group shooting. Field target shooting was the most popular of the American group airgun shooting sports, but even that involved much less than one percent of adult airgun shooters.

Weihrauch began a cooperation with Theoben Engineering in England which resulted in the introduction of the Weihrauch HW 90 (the Beeman versions are the RX, RX-1 and RX-2). This was the first Weihrauch rifle using the patented Theoben gas-spring system. These new rifles sold very well in Great Britain and the United States for small-game hunting.

Hans Weihrauch, Sr. died on 3 April 1990, aged 63. He was posthumously decorated with the Federal Cross of Merit. His wife, Christel, and sons, Stefan and Hans-Hermann, took control of the company. Christel Weihrauch had shared the management of the firm for decades and the preparation of the two sons for their expected future management roles was well advanced. Both had been involved with the company all of their lives and had nearly finished their engineering and marketing training as well.

== Cartridge rifles ==
- HW 660 Match
- HW 60 Match
- HW 60 J
- HW 66

== Cartridge pistols ==
- HW 4
- HW 4 T
- HW 357

== Revolvers ==
- Arminius is Weihrauch's line of revolvers

== Air rifles ==
| Model | Role/stated purpose | Introduced as a replacement for | Physical size | Price class | Power source | Pellet loading method | Known variants | Notes | Also sold as |
|---|---|---|---|---|---|---|---|---|---|
| HW 25 | Lightweight trainer rifle | | Junior | Entry-level | Spring piston | Break-barrel, single-shot | L | Basic stock with no butt pad, trigger integral with receiver. Intended as a trainer for children, and for basic shooting by smaller-statured shooters. | |
| HW 30 | Lightweight all-purpose rifle | | Compact | Entry-level (M/II), mid-level (S) | Spring piston | Break-barrel, single-shot | M/II, S | Most versions have open sights as standard. Current HW 30 models have a ball-bearing-detent barrel lock, and receiver tube rear end secured by screws. M/II versions have a basic ('Perfekt') trigger. S versions have interchangeable front sight inserts, and the fully adjustable ('Rekord') trigger. | HW 30 S sold in the US as the Beeman R7. |
| HW 35 | Mid/heavyweight all-purpose rifle | | Full-sized | Mid-level (HW 35 Standard), Premium (HW 35 E) | Spring piston | Break-barrel, single-shot | E, LS | Weihrauch's first mass-market high-powered air rifle. Fitted with a manual breech lock. Best-selling and longest-produced Weihrauch air rifle as of December 2020. Produced in a variety of styles with different stocks and barrel lengths. Current HW 35 Standard has a sporter stock of Walnut-grained Beech. Current HW 35 E has a true Walnut sporter stock with white butt pad and grip cap inserts. | |
| HW 50 | Middle-weight all-purpose rifle | | Full-sized | Mid-level | Spring piston | Break-barrel, single-shot | M/II, S | Chisel-detent barrel lock. Originally fitted with screw-threaded receiver tube rear end, but has since changed to a rear end retained by push-in blocks. M/II versions have a basic ('Perfekt') trigger. S versions have interchangeable front sight inserts, and the fully adjustable ('Rekord') trigger. | HW 50 S sold in the US as the Beeman R8, and in the UK as the HW 99 S. |
| HW 55 | Middle-weight match rifle | | Full-sized | Premium | Spring piston | Break-barrel, single-shot | S, M, T, CM, HWB Champ, SF, MF, TF | Approximately the same length and mass as the HW 50, but with lower power levels, adjustable rotating barrel lock, Diopter sights, and a refined version of the adjustable 'Rekord' trigger. Several variants were produced, with each variant defined by stock style. Production started in approximately 1955; all versions have been discontinued.: S (Sport): Plain beech sporter stock.; M (Match): Bavarian Walnut stock.; T (Tyrolean): Hand-carved Tyrolean-style Walnut stock with pronounced cheek curve.; CM (Custom Match): Bulkier Walnut target stock than M and T versions; fitted with accessory rail and sliding butt plate. In some markets, the CM version was called the 'HW55 Match'.; HWB Champ: Smaller-dimensioned version for junior shooters. Short barrel with weighted sleeve, adjustable trigger blade and ambidextrous Beech stock.; SF, MF, and TF: These earlier versions of the HW 55 S, M and T were not equipped with a breech-locking lever, instead using the same auto-detent breech as the HW 50. The F stands for 'Federbolzen' (Spring bolt). | |
| HW 57 | Mid-heavyweight all-purpose rifle | | Full-sized | Mid-level | Spring piston | Underlever cocking, single-shot | | Basic underlever cocking mechanism, utilising a pop-up breech in place of the sliding breech cover used on the HW 77 and HW 97. | |
| HW 77 | Heavyweight competition/all-purpose rifle | | Full-sized | Premium | Spring piston | Underlever cocking, single-shot | Special Edition, K, K Special Edition | Weihrauch’s first underlever springer rifle. Underlever cocking mechanism with sliding breech cover. Designed for field target and longer-distance shooting. Currently in its second evolution, with updated stock styles (see Weihrauch HW 77 for details). Current ‘Special Edition’ models have a brown/green/black laminated stock. | Sold in the US as the Beeman HW 77 and HW 77 K. Upon the acquisition of Beeman Airguns by SR Industries, the HW 77 and HW 77 K were briefly marketed as the Marksman 60 and Marksman 61. |
| HW 80 | Heavyweight all-purpose rifle | HW 35 | Full-sized | Mid/premium | Spring piston | Break-barrel, single-shot | K, SD | A re-designed, more powerful version of the HW 35, designed and manufactured in collaboration with Beeman Airguns. No barrel lock. Single-piece cocking arm. SD variant has 310mm barrel. Although the HW 80 was designed to replace the HW 35, continued steady sales meant that the HW 35 was not discontinued. The HW 80 is currently Weihrauch's most powerful spring-powered break-barrel rifle, exceeded only by the air-ram-powered HW 90. | Sold in the US as the Beeman R1. |
| HW 85 | Heavyweight all-purpose rifle | HW 35, HW 80 | Full-sized | Mid/premium | Spring piston | Break-barrel, single-shot | K | Designed as a lighter-weight replacement for the HW 80 that would still produce 12 to 16 ft.lbs muzzle energy (dependent on which market it was sold in). Early versions had a screw-threaded receiver tube rear end, and raised alloy scope rail. Current model has a sporter stock of Walnut-grained Beech. Although the HW 85 was designed to replace the HW 80, continued steady sales meant that the HW 80 was not discontinued. | Sold in the US as the Beeman R10. |
| HW 90 | Heavyweight hunting rifle | | Full-sized | Premium | Compressed-air pneumatic ram | Break-barrel, single-shot | K | Specifically designed for small-game hunting. Equipped with pressure-adjustable compressed-air ram (designed, and originally produced for Weihrauch by Theoben Engineering), and open sights. A carbine-barrelled K version was sold with 1/2" UNF screw-on silencer and no open sights. All HW 90 models have the 'Elite' trigger with re-engageable safety. The trigger is a completely different design to the earlier 'Rekord' trigger, and was partly re-designed at some time during the manufacturing run. | HW 90 and HW 90 K sold in the US as the Beeman RX-1 and RX-2. |
| HW 95 | Heavyweight all-purpose rifle | HW 35, HW 80, HW 85 | Full-sized | Mid/premium | Spring piston | Break-barrel, single-shot | K, L | Designed as a replacement for the HW 85. Receiver tube rear end retained by four press-in blocks. Originally offered without open sights. Current HW 95 Standard has a sporter stock of Walnut-grained Beech. Current HW 95 Luxus has interchangeable front sight inserts and a sporter stock of Walnut-grained Beech with extended fore-end. Although the HW 95 was designed to replace the HW 85, continued steady sales meant that the HW 85 was not discontinued. | Sold in the US as the Beeman R9. In some other world markets, the HW 95 is sold as the HW 85. |
| HW 97 | Heavyweight competition/all-purpose rifle | | Full-sized | Premium | Spring piston | Underlever cocking, single-shot | L, Special Edition, K Special Edition, K, KT, K-STL, KT-STL | Modified HW 77 with 300mm barrel, basic sound moderator and no open sights. Developed specifically for field target and silhouette shooting. An HW 97 L version has been made available with a 385mm barrel. The rifle features a choice of sporter and thumbhole stocks. Current sporter stocks are available in Beech (HW 97 K) or blue laminate (HW 97 K Special Edition). Current thumbhole stocks are available in Beech (HW 97 KT) and synthetic (HW 97 Black Line). The Black Line variant is available in a choice of blued or electroless satin nickel (STL) finish. | HW 97 K sold in the US as the Beeman HW 97 K. HW 97 L also sold by Sandwell Field Sport as the SFS Chieftain. |
| HW 98 | Heavyweight competition/all-purpose rifle | | Full-sized | Premium | Spring piston | Break-barrel, single-shot | Limited Edition | Uses an HW 95 action mated with a heavy sleeved barrel. No open sights. Hybrid match/sporter stock in Beech, with a cheekpiece and aluminium/rubber butt pad both adjustable for height. Later versions use a plastic/rubber butt pad that is also adjustable for tilt. Designed for precision shooting at longer distances (for example, hunting, hunter field target and silhouette shooting). A limited edition was briefly available with a laminate stock in two-tone grey, threaded muzzle, and 1/2" UNF silencer. | |
| HW 99 S | | | | | | | See HW 50 | HW 50 S, re-designated for the UK market. | |
| HW 100 | Heavyweight competition/all-purpose rifle | | Full-sized | Premium | Pre-charged pneumatic, regulated air delivery | Side-lever cocking, rotary 14-shot magazine | S, SK, T, TK, S-FSB, SK-FSB, T-FSB, TK-FSB | Receiver and action feature two-piece machined aluminium alloy construction. All S, SK, T and TK versions are also available with fully-shrouded barrels. As an alternative to oiled Walnut stocks of similar quality to those found on E-suffix spring-piston rifles, T and TK versions are also available with a synthetic stock, and with a laminate stock featuring a cheekpiece that is adjustable for height, and a plastic/rubber butt pad that is adjustable for height and tilt. | |
| HW 101 | Heavyweight competition/all-purpose rifle | | Full-sized | Premium | Pre-charged pneumatic, regulated air delivery | Side-lever cocking, single-shot loading tray | S, T, TK | Single-shot variant of the HW 100. Discontinued. | |
| HW 100 BP | Lightweight hunting/all-purpose rifle | | Compact (BP), ultra-compact (BP-K) | Premium | Pre-charged pneumatic, regulated air delivery | Side-lever cocking, rotary 14-shot magazine | BP-K | Shortened 'Bullpup'-style variants of the HW 100, using the same action and air delivery system. Available in left-handed and right-handed versions, and with Picatinny or 11-millimetre dovetail scope mounting points. Additional Picatinny rail mounted on fore-end for fitment of accessories. | |
| HW 110 | Lightweight hunting/all-purpose rifle | | Full-sized (ST), compact (ST-K) | Mid/premium | Pre-charged pneumatic, regulated air delivery | Side-lever cocking, rotary 10-shot magazine | ST, ST-K | Designed as a more affordable alternative to the HW 100. Receiver and action feature one-piece polymer-frame construction. Available in left-handed and right-handed versions. Additional Picatinny rail mounted on fore-end for fitment of accessories. | |

=== Evolution of the high-power break-barrel sporter range ===
The HW 35 was Weihrauch's first mass-market, high-powered, spring-powered sporter air rifle. However, with time, the HW 35 became technically obsolete as newer, more advanced air rifles entered the market. The HW 80, HW 85 and HW 95 were all designed as evolutionary replacements for the HW 35, and all occupy the same approximate market segment. The HW 80, HW 85 and HW 95 were added to the product lineup as they were introduced.

=== Air rifle model designation suffixes ===
The meanings of the suffixes used by Weihrauch for air rifles are as follows:

- 'E' (Export) rifles typically have American-specification walnut stocks with white buttplate and grip-cap accents, and factory-fitted sling swivels.
- The barrels of 'FSB' (Fully-shrouded barrel) rifles have an outer shroud (sleeve), internal baffles, and larger overall diameter. This is intended as a more compact, albeit less effective alternative to a screw-on or slip-on silencer, which would add extra length to the rifle.
- 'K' (‘Karbine’) rifles have a carbine-style barrel that is shorter than the barrel fitted to the equivalent full-length rifle.
- When applied to the HW 97, 'L' signifies 'Lang' (German for 'Long'), denoting a 385mm barrel. On all other rifles, 'L' signifies a 'Luxus' (German for ‘luxury’) rifle with a stock finished to a very high standard, usually from Walnut.
- The ‘LS’ (‘Lockschaft’, German for ‘thumbhole’) suffix was only used on HW 35 models equipped with a thumbhole stock. On all other Weihrauch thumbhole-stock rifles, this suffix was replaced with ‘T’.
- The 'M' (Match) suffix was only used on HW 55 models equipped with a match-style stock.
- Where basic HW 30 M/II and HW 50 M/II rifles are equipped with the unadjustable ‘Perfekt’ trigger, an 'S' suffix signifies an upgraded model fitted with the fully adjustable 'Rekord' trigger. When applied to the HW 55, ‘S’ means 'Sport', signifying a plain Beech sporter stock.
- 'ST' signifies a synthetic (plastic) stock.
- 'STL' signifies a barrel, receiver and cocking lever in a light silvered finish of electroless satin nickel plating instead of conventional blueing. Note that this suffix does not, as is commonly assumed, mean ‘Stainless Steel’.
- When applied to the HW 55, 'T' means 'Tyrolean', signifying a Tyrolean-style curved cheekpiece stock. For all other Weihrauch rifles, 'T' signifies a thumbhole stock.

== Air pistols ==
| Model | Type | Details |
|---|---|---|
| HW 40 | Pneumatic | |
| HW 44 | Pre-charged pneumatic | |
| HW 45 | Spring piston | |
| HW 70 | Spring piston, break barrel | |
| HW 75 | Pneumatic | |

== Weihrauch Patent information ==
- DE 734985 Selbstladepistole mit Spannabzug. Veröffentlicht am 4. Mai 1943, Anmelder: Hermann Weihrauch Gewehr und Fahrradteilefabrik.‌
- DE 739126 Selbstladepistole mit Spannabzug. Veröffentlicht am 11. September 1943, Anmelder: Hermann Weihrauch Gewehr und Fahrradteilefabrik.‌
- DE 739124 Insbesondere als Pistole ausgebildete Druckluftschusswaffe. Veröffentlicht am 11. September 1943, Anmelder: Firma Hermann Weihrauch.‌
- DE 2327335 Trommel-Revolver. Veröffentlicht am 12. Dezember 1974, Anmelder: Hermann Weihrauch OHG Sportwaffen und Fahrradteilefabrik, 8744 Mellrichstadt, DE.‌
- DE 3818838 Pistole. Veröffentlicht am 7. Dezember 1989, Anmelder: Hermann Weihrauch KG, 8744 Mellrichstadt, DE, Erfinder: Helmut Sauer, 8745 Ostheim, DE.‌
- DE 674237 Tuerschliesser mit Feststellvorrichtung. Angemeldet am 5. Februar 1937, veröffentlicht am 11. April 1939, Anmelder: Firma Hermann Weihrauch, Erfinder: Werner Weihrauch, Hans Müller.‌
- DE 674237 Hydraulischer Tuerschliesser. Veröffentlicht am 2. August 1940, Anmelder: Hermann Weihrauch, Waffenfabrik, Erfinder: Hermann Weihrauch, Werner Weihrauch.‌
