= E'Lite =

1982 microcomputer

- Developer: Barrington International Corporation
- Manufacturer: Barrington International Corporation
- Type: Microcomputer (small-form-factor)
- Released: 1982; 44 years ago
- Operating system: CP/M; MP/M
- CPU: Zilog Z80B
- Memory: 64–320 KB RAM

The E'Lite is a small-form-factor microcomputer based on the Zilog Z80B microprocessor released by Barrington International Corporation in 1982. It served as the market introduction of Irwin Magnetic Systems' long-awaited 510 Winchester tape drives.

== Development and specifications ==
William M. Cassell formed Barrington International in Ann Arbor, Michigan, in 1980, after leaving the Candor Computer Corporation located in the same city, where he was employed as its executive vice president. The E'Lite was the product of nearly two years of development and was delivered to customers in September 1982, two months after its announcement and projected release date. Cassell designed the computer around the 8-bit Zilog Z80B microprocessor, at a time when the industry was shifting en masse to 16-bit processors for microcomputers. He explained that the immediate dearth of prepackaged 16-bit software would have hindered sales of his computer, had he designed it around a 16-bit processor. He planned on releasing such a computer in the spring of 1983, although this never came to fruition.

The E'Lite served as the market introduction of Irwin Magnetic Systems's long-anticipated 510 Winchester tape drives. Irwin was a computer storage manufacturer out of Ann Arbor founded by several former executives of Sycor Inc.; Cassell himself had worked at Sycor before his employment at Candor. The 510 Winchester drives were co-developed by Olivetti S.p.A. of Italy. The tapes for the drive can hold up to 10 MB of data, while its seek time was rated for 33 ms. Random writes reportedly took one-fifth the time to complete as compared to 5.25-inch floppy disks. The 510 Winchester fits in the E'Lite's sole 5.25 drive bay. An external 5.25-inch floppy drive, which plugs into the computer's built-in floppy controller, was also included.

The E'Lite came with 2 KB of page cache for the disk drives, while its RAM was maxed out to 64 KB. The computer came shipped with CP/M or, optionally, MP/M—single-user and multi-user operating systems respectively—although on launch the computer could not take advantage of multi-user software. In late October 1982, Barrington unveiled a daughtercard for the E'Lite housing 256 KB of RAM, a second Zilog Z80B, and four additional RS-232 serial ports. This allowed each computer to support up to five concurrent users on ASCII terminals, using these four serial ports and the stock E'Lite's one. This daughtercard came shipped with MP/M. The E'Lite additionally has one Centronics-style parallel port.

Cassell signed an agreement with his former employer Candor to ship the E'Lite with the latter's Series 20-3 database management system. The daughtercard came meanwhile shipped with MicroPro's WordStar word processor, and Comshare's Target PlannerCalc financial planning suite.

Barrington International employed 10 people in August 1983 and by that time had established an international dealer network. The company had only sold 100 units of the E'Lite by that August however, and a 16-bit version of the E'Lite teased in June 1982 had not come to pass by that point. Barrington was defunct no later than 1986, when Cassell joined the Michigan Technology Council to serve as its executive director.

== Citations ==
- Bochner, Peter (July 12, 1982). "CP/M-Based Micro Integrates Irwin Winchester". Computer Business News. 5 (28): 9 – via the Internet Archive.
- Brown, Jeffrey C. (July 12, 1982). "New E'lite computer bucks the industry's 16-bit trend". InfoWorld. 4 (27): 13 – via Google Books.
- McKee, Pamela J., ed. (February 1983). "E'lite". CP/M Review. 1 (2): 52 – via the Internet Archive.
- Slater, Karen (August 20, 1979). "Condor Puts High Hopes on Small Business System". Computer Business News. 2 (34): 5 – via the Internet Archive.
- Staff writer (July 6, 1982a). "Micro Features Built-in Winnie". Computerworld. 16 (27): 64 – via the Internet Archive.
- Staff writer (September 13, 1982b). "Page Two Report". Computer Business News. 5 (35): 2 – via the Internet Archive.
- Staff writer (October 25, 1982c). "Barrington International's E'lite Upgraded to Multiuser System". Computerworld. 16 (43): 75 – via the Internet Archive.
- Staff writer (November 29, 1982d). "Micro Is Field-Upgradable to Networking Capability". ISO World. 5 (40): 80 – via the Internet Archive.
- Staff writer (August 24, 1983a). "Vendors". Computerworld. 17 (31A): V-1–V-22 – via the Internet Archive.
- Staff writer (August 24, 1983b). "Vendors". Computerworld. 17 (31A): D-1–D-56 – via the Internet Archive.
- Staff writer (April 20, 1986). "William W. Cassell". Lansing State Journal: 1E, 6E – via Newspapers.com.
