= Elite (restaurant) =

Restaurant in Helsinki, Finland

Coordinates: 60°10′35.65″N 024°55′22.51″E

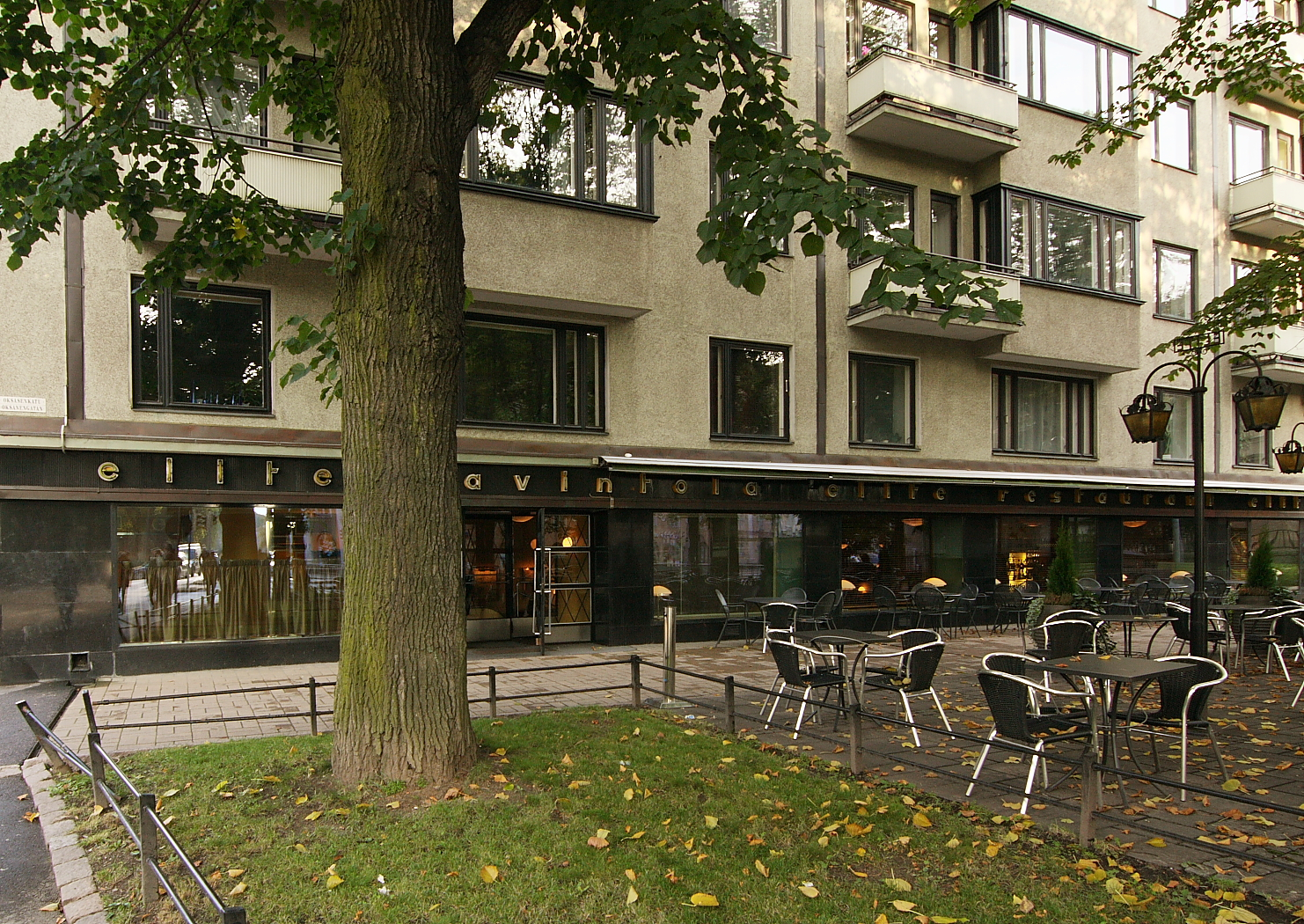
Restaurant Elite.

Elite is a restaurant located in Töölö in Helsinki, Finland, at Eteläinen Hesperiankatu 22. Elite was founded in 1932. The original restaurant manager was Ernst Mattas. The restaurant moved to its current premises in the new Reitz house in 1938, where a separate building was designed for the restaurant on the ground floor. Ernst Mattas's successor was his son Willy together with his wife Margaretha up to 1985, when the restaurant was taken over by Alko's daughter company Kantaravintolat and then by Arctia up to 1997, when it was bought by Royal Ravintolat together with other Arctia-owned restaurants.

Elite become famous among the artists in Helsinki right from the start. Famous customers have included writers Satu and Mika Waltari, actors Tauno Palo, Kirsti Ortola, Sakari Halonen, Uuno Laakso and Aku Korhonen, artists Aimo Kanerva and Unto Koistinen, cultural and political writer Matti Kurjensaari and musicians from Aarne Merikanto to Selim Palmgren. The location near the Lallukka artist home had a great impact on Elite's role as an artist restaurant. The restaurant was Tauno Palo's favourite. Elite still serves an onion steak named after him. Palo's usual table is marked with a plaque.

The restaurant was designed in 1938 by the Stockmann architecture bureau. The restaurant was renovated in 1986 by Studio Pekka Perjo. Elite's image includes the traditional, almost entirely preserved milieu with white tablecloths and paintings belonging to the Mattas family private collection, which number 26 in total and of which at least the following have been painted by Lallukka artists: Stilleben ("still life") by Väinö Hervo (1954), Lappi ("Lapland") by P. Lindfors (1940), Miehiä ("men") (1982), Joen rannalla ("on the river shore") (1986), Kulmakapakka ("corner bar") (1986) by T. Mäntynen and Lemminkäinen ja Aino ("Lemminkäinen and Aino") (1955), Lemminkäinen saapuu saaren neitojen luo ("Lemminkäinen arrives among the island maidens") (1955) and Neitsyt Maria ("the virgin Mary") (1954) by M. Visanti.

Aarni Krohn described Elite in his memoir:

"Elite kind of avoids descriptions. It can not be exactly defined. An artist bar - yes, already because Lallukka is located nearby, but not just because of that. Very much a local bar, but not just that. The Töölöans' own oasis, why not? A stopping and discussion bar for the local authorities, for sure."
