= Arminius (revolvers) =

Firearm manufacturer of Germany

The Arminius Revolver logo.

Arminius is a line of revolvers manufactured by Weihrauch & Weihrauch GmbH & Co. KG, of Mellrichstadt, Germany, a manufacturer of target and sporting air rifles, air pistols, cartridge rifles and pistols.

== History ==
Weihrauch's first model revolver was the HW-3 produced in 1960, followed in 1962 by the HW-4, and since 1965 the HW-5. These revolvers were named after the chief of the Germanic Cherusci tribe, Arminius (Latinized name) who led Teutonic warriors in several battles against Rome during the later stages of Roman Emperor Augustus' reign

== US imports and rebrands ==
Over the past fifty years the various Arminius models have been imported into the United States by different companies. these include Firearms Import & Export (F.I.E.) of Hialeah/Miami, Florida. Various importers often renamed the models to make them more marketable to U.S. gun buyers.

- Herters imported the HW-7 .22 caliber revolver as the Herter's Guide Model.
- L.A. Distributors of Brooklyn, New York imported the HW-5 as The Omega while the HW-3 was the Dickson Bulldog.
- F.I.E. imported the HW-357 and HW-38 as the FIE Titan Tiger.
- European American Armory (EAA) imported the HW-357 as the EAA-Arminius Windicator and was given a heavy full shroud barrel. EAA also imported the various Single Action Army clones as the Hombre and Bounty Hunter.

== Models ==
Arminius medallion as found on some of its revolvers.

Note that "HW" stands for Hermann Weihrauch, the founder of Weihrauch & Weihrauch GmbH & Co. KG.

- Arminius HW-1 starter gun
- HW 3 Double Action Revolver in .22 Long Rifle, .22 Winchester Magnum, and .32 S&W Long
  - HW 3 "Duo" version with two cylinders; one in .22 Win Mag. and the other in .22 LR.
- HW-4 - 8 .22 LR snub nose revolver
- HW 5 Double Action Revolver in .22 LR, .22 Winchester Magnum, and .32 S&W Long
  - HW 5 "Duo" version with two cylinders; one in .22 Win Mag. and the other in .22 LR
- HW 7 Double Action Revolver in .22 LR, .22 Winchester Magnum, and .32 S&W Long
  - "Duo" version with two cylinders; one in .22 Win Mag. and the other in .22 LR
- HW 9, 6 inch barrelled .22 LR "sport" revolvers
- HW 10, 5 shot 9 mm R. NC. blank firing revolver
- HW 22, 8 round .22 LR
- HW 357 "Hunter" and HW 357 T, both are 6 round .357 magnum revolvers with "T" being the Target variant,
- HW 37, 5 shot 9 mm R. NC. blank and gas (CN or CS) cartridges
  - HW 37 S, starter gun
- HW 38, 6 shot .38 Special
- HW 88 SUPER Airweight, 5 shot 9 mm R. NC. blank firing revolver
- Western Single Action (WSA), Single Action Army clones in 9 mm R. NC. and .357 Magnum, .44 Magnum and .45 Colt cartridges.

== Gallery ==
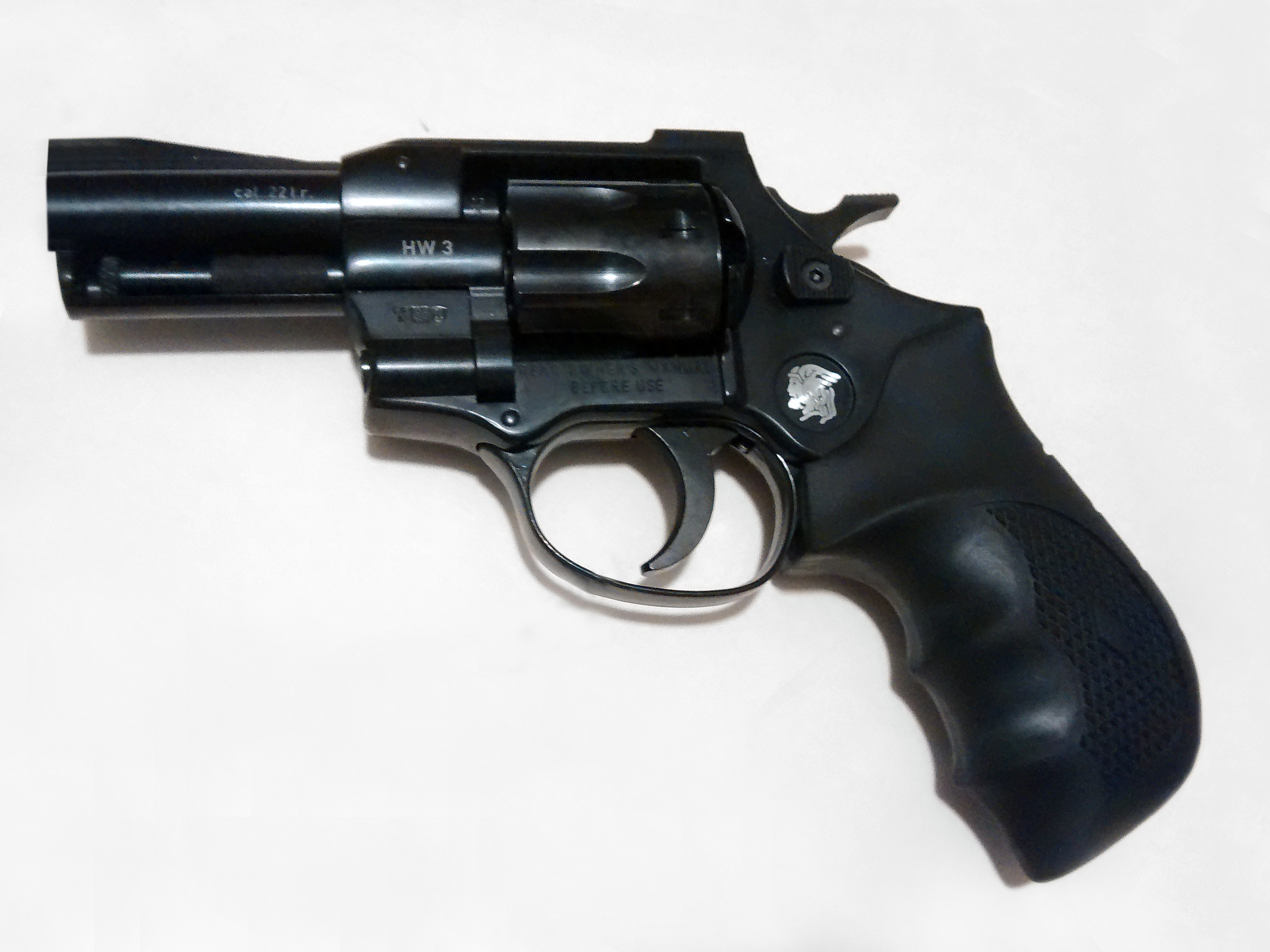
The Arminus HW 3 8 shot .22 LR revolver

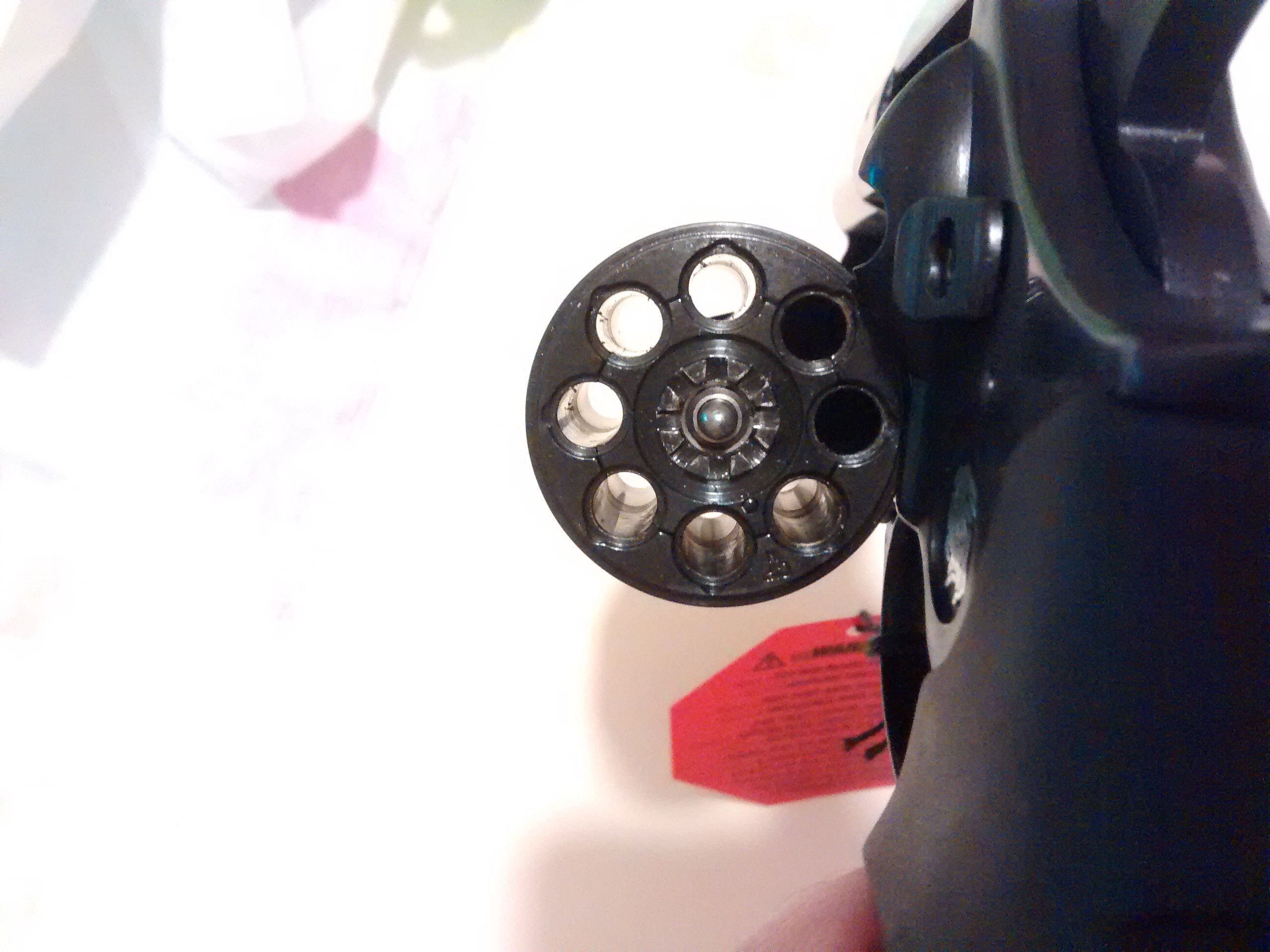
The open cylinder Arminus HW 3 8 shot .22 LR revolver

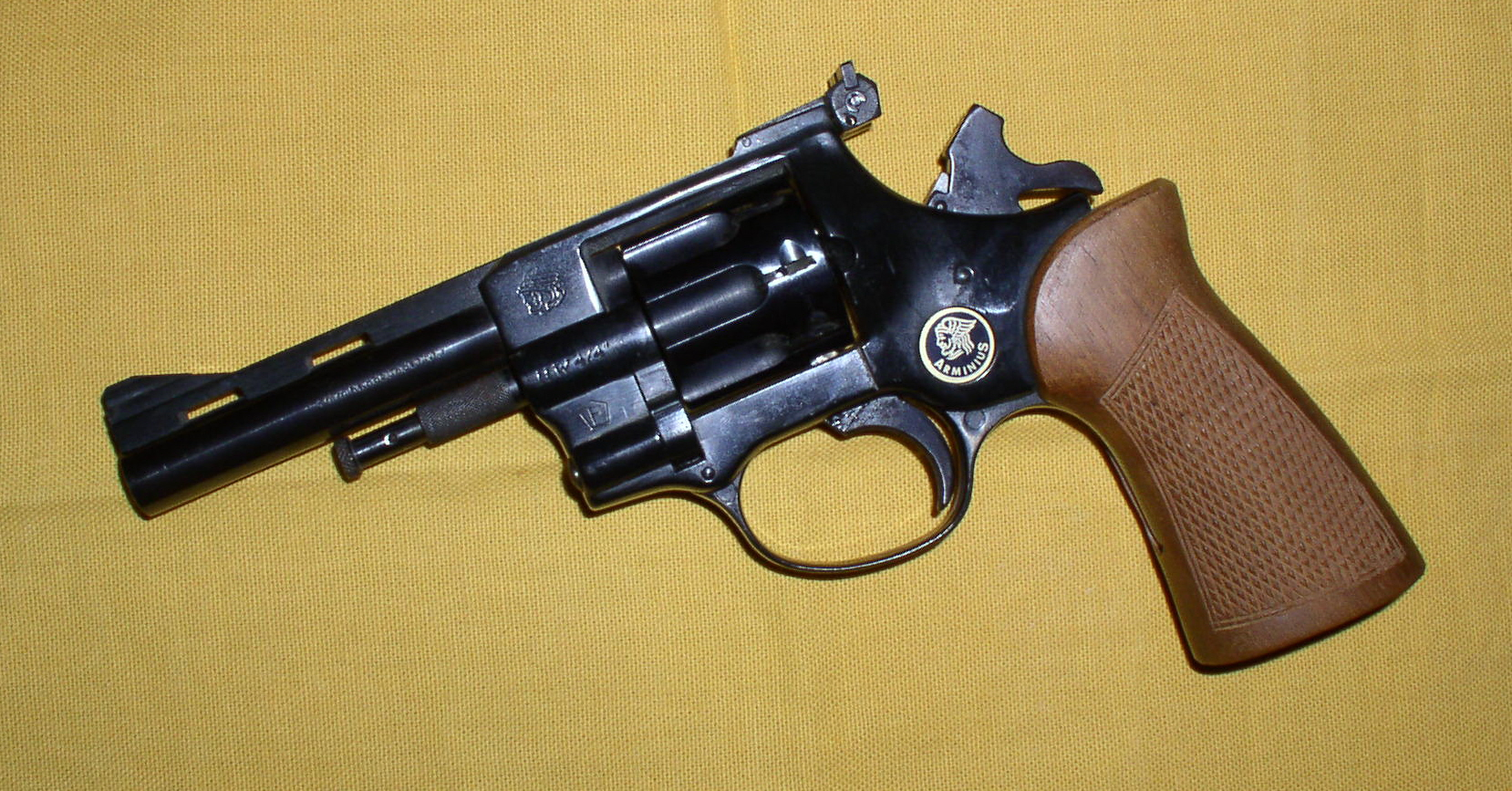
Arminus HW 4 with 4 inch barrel 8 shot .22 LR revolver.

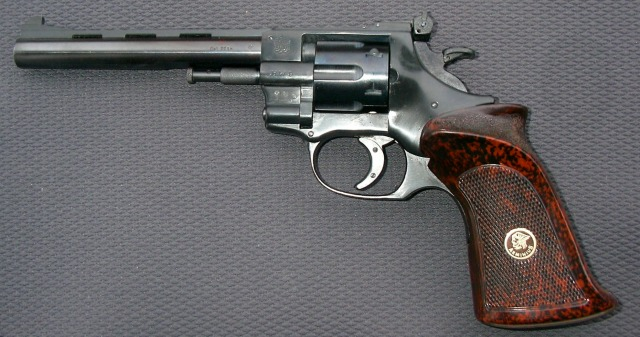
Arminius HW 9 .22 cal Sport

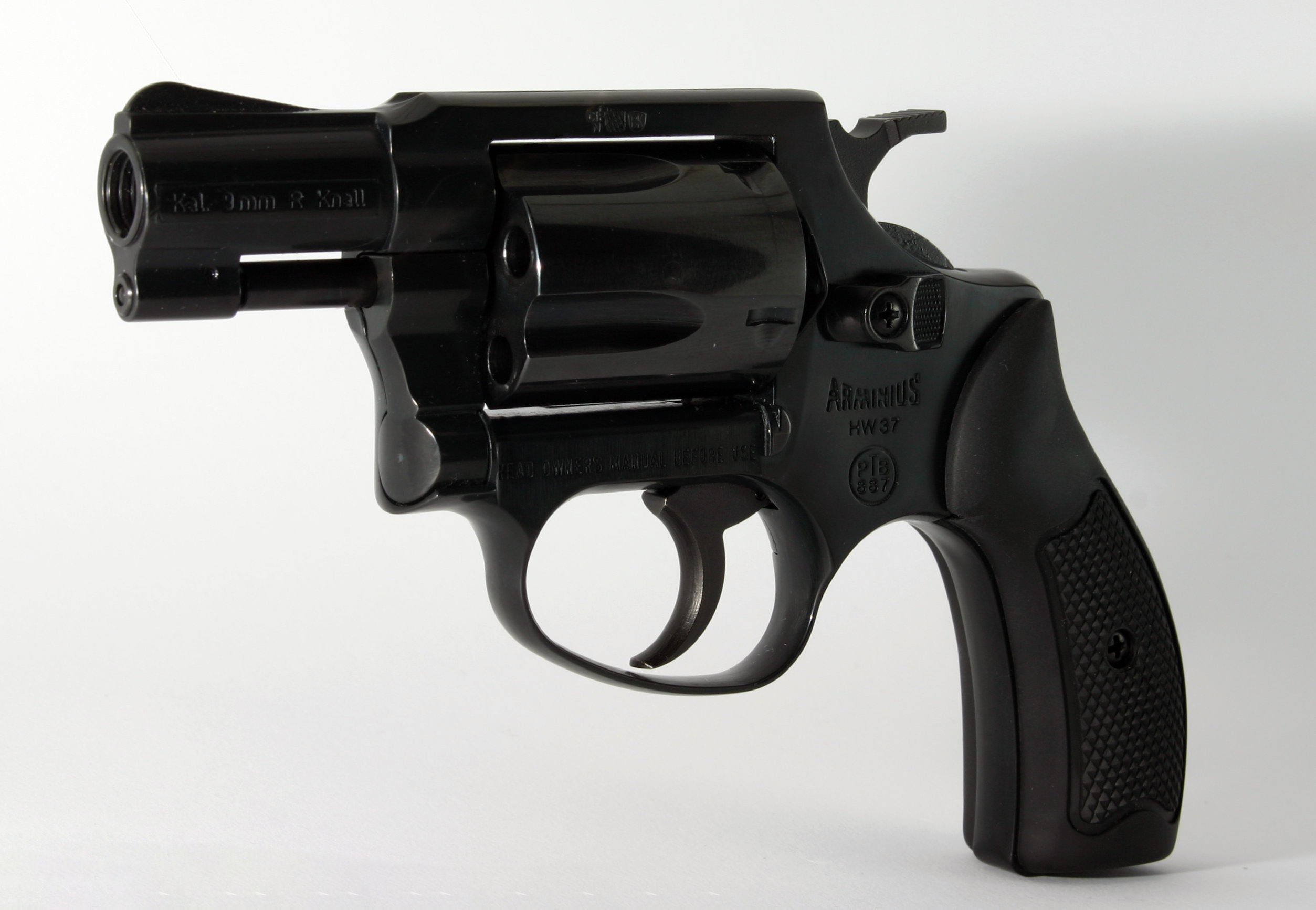
Arminius HW 37 5 shot 9mm R. NC. (blank and gas (CN or CS) cartridges) revolver.

== See also ==
Other German revolver brands:

- Janz (revolvers)
- Korth
- Röhm also known as RG (defunct)
- Weihrauch
