= Beretta Elite II =

The Beretta Elite II is an air pistol manufactured by Umarex and distributed in the United States by Umarex USA. It has only a few similarities to the Beretta 92G Elite II, but it does have its good features. It is made of polymer, but it has a steel magazine, trigger, magazine release button, and CO_{2} chamber. Its magazine holds 19 .177 caliber (4.5mm) BBs, is powered by 12 gram CO_{2} cartridges, is double action only, and has a safety catch, but not on the original place a Beretta 92 would have it. The Beretta 92 safety catch is visible, but does not work.

== Statistics ==
- Loudness- About 3-Medium
- Weight- 1.50 lb (0.68 kg).
- Barrel Length- 4.80 inches
- Overall Length- 8.50 inches
- Capacity- 19 rounds
- Barrel- Smoothbore
- Velocity- 480 ft/s (150 m/s)
- Front Sight- Blade and Ramp
- Scopeable- No, but it does have an accessory rail, for a light or laser.
- Trigger Action- Double Action Only
- Trigger Adjust- Single Stage
- Buttplate- None
- Action- semi-automatic
- Powered By- 12 Gram CO_{2} Gas Cylinders
- Safety- Manual
- Manufacturer- Umarex USA
- made in-1994

== Similarities and Differences from the 92G Elite II ==
- It does not have the standard silver slide.
- The 92G Elite II had no accessory rail.
- The trigger seems to be bigger, as the size on a Beretta 92FS.
- The Elite II 92G didn't have as much polymer as the Elite II Umarex has.
- The hammer pin is the same, however, it does not work.
- The barrel size is bigger, such as a Beretta 92FS would have.
- A grip for the 92G Elite II was similar to the one supplied on the Umarex Elite II.
- The exposed front barrel was not available on the 92G Elite II.
