= National Police Intervention Groups =

Elite units of the National French Police, missing in 2019

- Groupes d'Intervention de la Police Nationale (French)
- Active: 27 October 1972 – 2019
- Country: France
- Agency: National Police
- Type: Police tactical unit
- Role: Counter-terrorism; Law enforcement
- Motto: "La cohésion fait la force" "Cohesion brings strength"
- Abbreviation: GIPN

Commanders
- Notable commanders: Georges Nguyen Van Loc

Notables
- Significant operation(s): Anti–Action directe arrests; Anti-GIA operations; 2005 Paris riots

National Police Intervention Groups (GIPN; French: Groupes d'Intervention de la Police Nationale) were tactical units of the French National Police based in large cities in metropolitan France and in French overseas territories.

GIPN units operated in metropolitan France from 1972 until 2015 when they were integrated into the RAID (French: Recherche, Assistance, Intervention, Dissuasion) tactical unit as regional RAID (French: antennes RAID. Overseas territory units were integrated in 2019.

== History ==
In the wake of the tragic events of the Munich massacre in which Israeli Olympic team members were kidnapped and killed by Palestinian terrorists, the various European police forces decided to form special units able to fight against forms of terrorism and for other crises such as excessive use of force, hostage situations, escorts etc.

The French National Police responded by creating an "anti-commando" brigade—also known as BRI-BAC—within the Paris Research and Intervention Brigade and GIPNs in the largest province cities, while the National Gendarmerie established its own unit: GIGN.

The first GIPN was created on 27 October 1972 in Marseille by the commissaire divisionnaire Georges Nguyen Van Loc. It could only intervene at the request of judges or prosecutors. It was composed of thirty men who had the latest weapons and sophisticated equipment and became the second hostage-rescue team of the French National Police after the Paris BRI-BAC.

The National Police initially formed 11 intervention groups but reduced this number to seven by 1985. This was later expanded to nine with the creation of GIPN units in Réunion in 1992 and in New Caledonia in 1993.

The Ministerial Circular of August 4, 1995 established the policies of the use of the GIPN: organization, rules of engagement, territorial competence, missions, principles of actions, implementation, means and coordination.

=== RAID integration ===
In November 2013, the metropolitan GIPNs came under operational control of the RAID, the National Police's tactical unit that had been established in 1985. Finally, in March 2015, they were permanently integrated and officially became "Regional RAID branches" (French: antennes RAID).

On 1 March 2019, the three French overseas territory units in New Caledonia, Réunion and Guadeloupe (jurisdiction over the French East Indies) were integrated into RAID becoming "Regional RAID branches".

== Organisation ==
The GIPN were created as units of the Central Directorate of Public Security (Fr: Direction Centrale de la Sécurité Publique or DCSP) which is the uniformed patrol and response branch of the French National Police. The DCSP has competency in 75 departments and within the territorial services of 7 large provincial towns (Lille, Strasbourg, Lyon, Nice, Marseille, Bordeaux, Rennes) and overseas (Réunion, New Caledonia and Antilles – French Guiana).

RAID, including its regional branches comes under the authority of the head of the national police force (French: Directeur général de la Police nationale or DGPN). RAID is also the leading unit of the National Police Intervention Force (French: Force d'Intervention de la Police Nationale, (FIPN)) a semi-permanent force which, when activated includes the BRI of the Préfecture de Police de Paris (BRI-BAC) and the overseas GIPNs.

Composed of police officers recruited according to very selective criteria, equipped with the best and latest material and subjected to a rigorous and followed drive, the GIPN can furnish groups of police officers to the service of other police units. Each unit is commanded by a senior police officer, assisted by a brigadier, brigadier-chef or brigadier-major. He has the command of his unit during an operation, having though assistance from other participating police services.

They intervene with other services of the National police force, each time the situation requires it, with the constant concern for the preservation of the physical integrity of negotiators and only to use necessary force strictly that as a last resort.

== Weapons and equipment ==
The GIPN arsenal included a wide range of weapons such as:

- Pistols: SIG Sauer SIG Pro SP2022 (specially developed for French law enforcement in the biggest single sidearm contract since WWII with 250,000 ordered for both agencies), Glock 17 and Glock 26.
- Revolvers: Manurhin MR-73, Blacksmith and Smith & Wesson 686.
- Submachine guns: H&K MP5, A3 and SD6, FN P90 and UMP45, American 180
- Assault rifles: H&K G36K and G36C, and the firm of the SSG 551 and 552 commando.
- Sniper rifles: PGM Ultima Ratio, Steyr-Mannlicher SSG, Blaser LRS2, Tikka T3 Tactical.
- Non-lethal weapons: Taser X26, LBD Brugger & Thomet 40×46, Verney-Carron Flash Ball.

As for personal protection, the GIPN maintained Kevlar helmets with bulletproof visors, bulletproof vests of different categories (II; III; IV or V), guards and knuckles, armored shields.

== Recruitment ==
Organised at the national level by the DCSP, the selections take place once a year and roll within a structure DFPN (ENP Saint-Malo or Nîmes) with the assistance of a group of psychologists. The first part of the selection is common to all the FIPN units. All National policemen and senior police officers may apply, as long as they meet the administrative criteria a minimum of five years of service and be no more than 35 years old. About fifty candidates are selected and conveyed to the selected site where, during a first week, they must pass a series of events, records review, personality tests, combat ability, claustrophobia, giddiness, athletic ability, swimming etc. At the end of this first week, part of the candidates are eliminated, and the others continue with mental tests during four days. After finishing these tests, a score of candidates will be admitted into the GIPN where their training now starts.

== In popular culture ==
- Books in French language:
  - José Nicolas, GIPN, Groupe d'Intervention de la Police Nationale, L'instantané, 2005 (ISBN 2-914720-12-2)
  - Bruno Bosilo, Jean-François Guiot, José Nicolas and Philippe Poulet, GIPN, Les Groupes d'intervention de la police nationale, Mission Spéciale Production, 2005 (ISBN 2-916357-01-7)
- Written mass-media in French language:
  - Lyon GIPN, article published in RAIDS magazine, n°148, September 1998;
  - Marseille GIPN, article published in RAIDS magazine, n°225, February 2005;
  - Marseille GIPN, article published in Commando magazine, n°16;
  - GIPN - Les Groupes d'intervention de la Police nationale(French National Police Intervention Groups), article published in Commando magazine, n°21, February- March 2005;
  - Action G.I.P.N., article published in Pro-Sécurité magazine, n°29, July- August 2005;
  - Lille GIPN, article published in Missions 112 magazine, n°4, October 2005;
  - Les GIPN, une force dissuasive (G.I.P.N., a deterrent force), article published in Police Pro magazine, n°2, April–March 2007.
- Documentaries:
  - Cobra 13, documentary on G.I.P.N. Marseille directed by Olivier Baudry and broadcast on 3 October 2001, (France 3, Des racines et des ailes - Roots and wings);
  - GIPN, les hommes du dernier recours, documentary on GIPN Nice directed by Nicolas Moscara and broadcast in 2003 on TF1, (Le Droit de savoir - The right to know);
  - GIPN, dans le secret des hommes d'action (G.I.P.N., the secret of action men), documentary on GIPN Bordeaux directed by Claire Perdrix and David Geoffrion, broadcast in 2005 on TF1, (Le Droit de savoir - The right to know);
  - Agressions, braquages, drogue : six mois avec les flics du GIPN (Aggressions, Robberies, Drugs: Six Months with G.I.P.N.'s Cops), documentary on GIPN Lille, broadcast in 2010 on TF1, (Appels d'urgence - Emergency calls).
- Fiction:
  - GIPN officers are portrayed as escorting an important prisoner in the 2017 film The Hitman's Bodyguard.
  - A GIPN officer is portrayed in A Foreign Country by Charles Cumming

== See also ==
- RAID (National Police)
- GIGN (National Gendarmerie)
- List of special response units
