= Human bomb =

Human bomb generally refers to a suicide bomber.

Human Bomb may also refer to

- Human Bomb, a fictional superhero published by DC Comics
- The hostage-taker in the 1993 Neuilly kindergarten hostage crisis in Neuilly-sur-Seine, France
