= Manurhin =

Trademark on revolvers

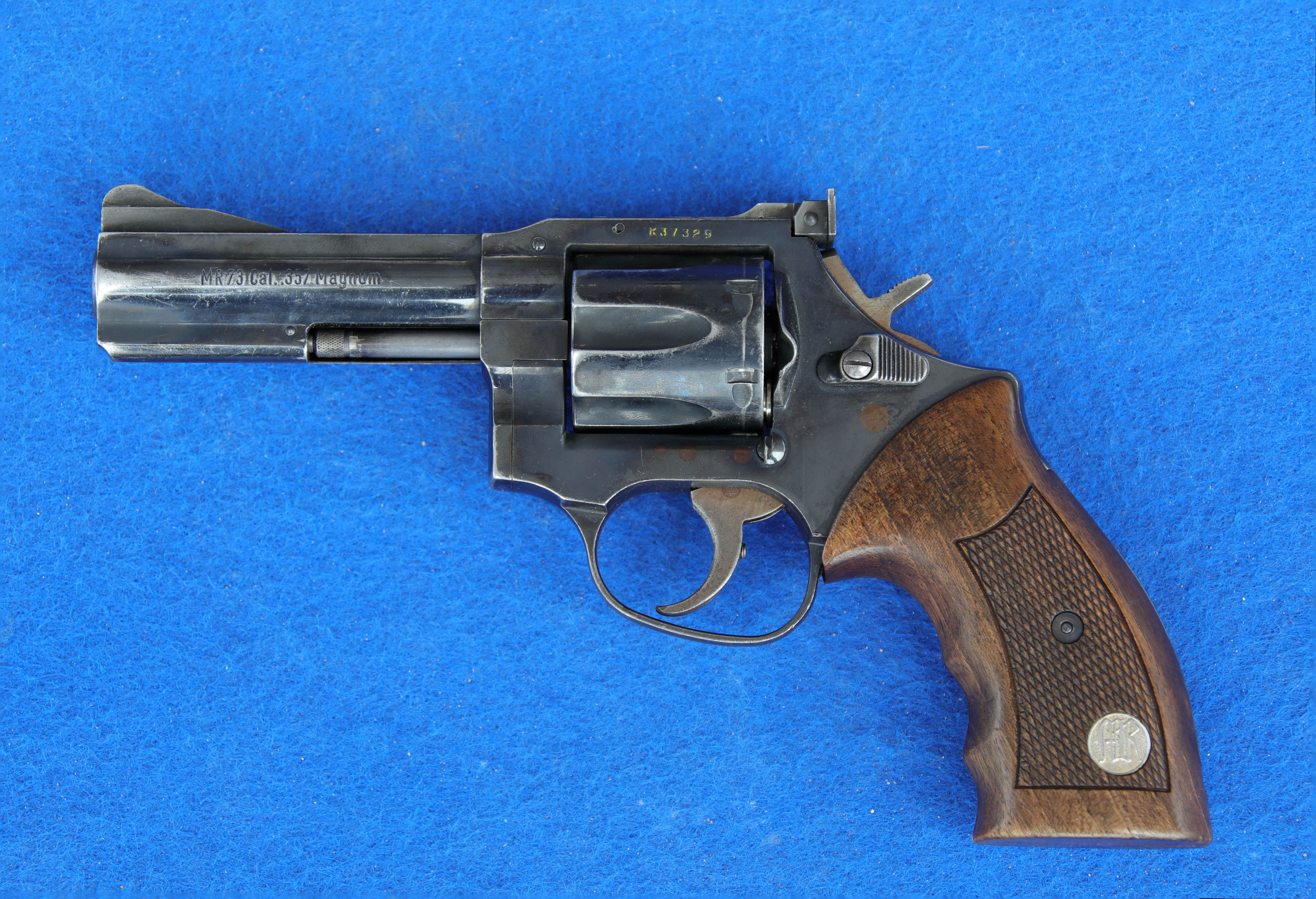
Manurhin MR 73 revolver traditionally issued to each GIGN operator, but no longer used operationally

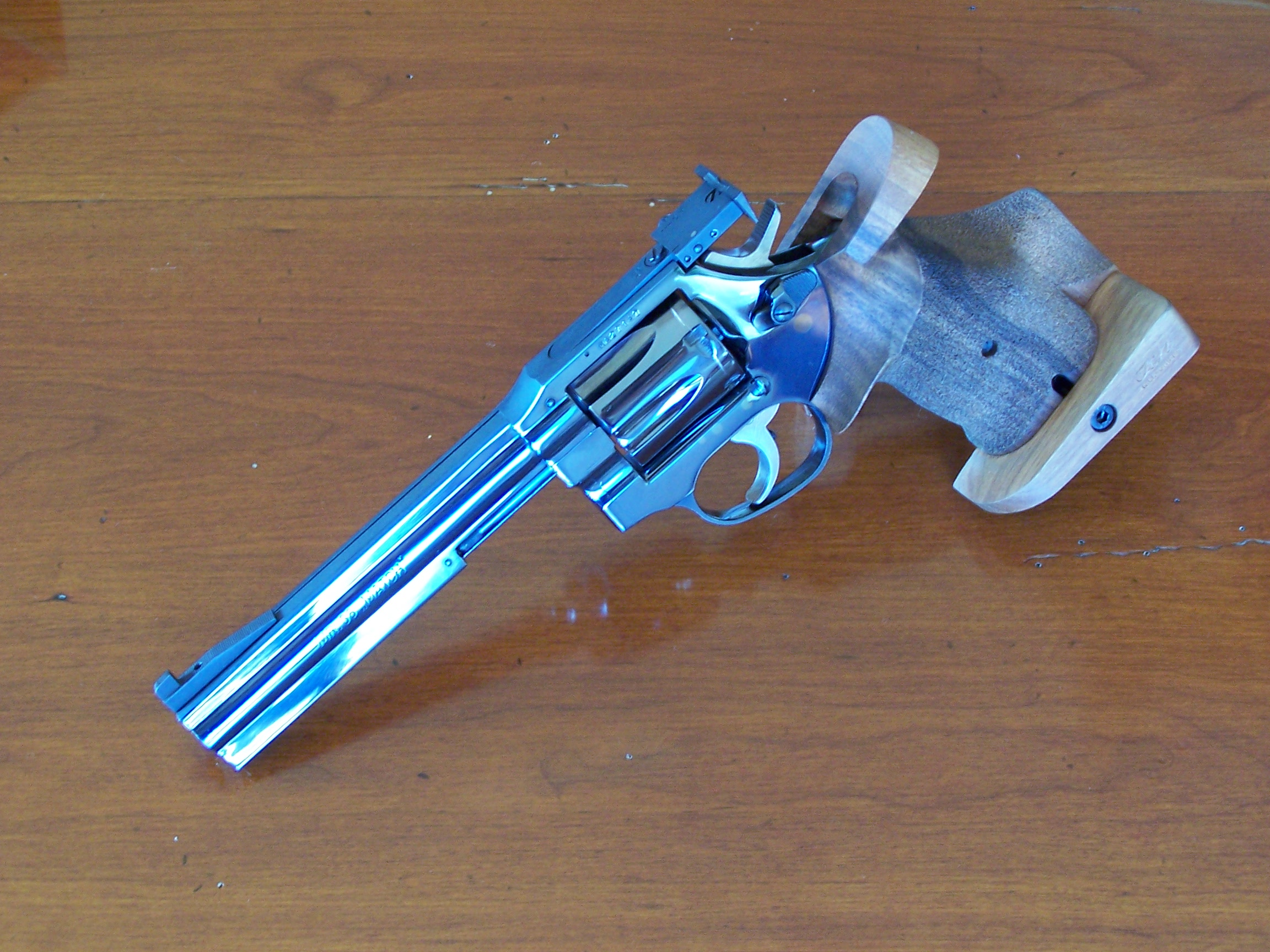
Manurhin MR 38 Match (MR 73 variant)

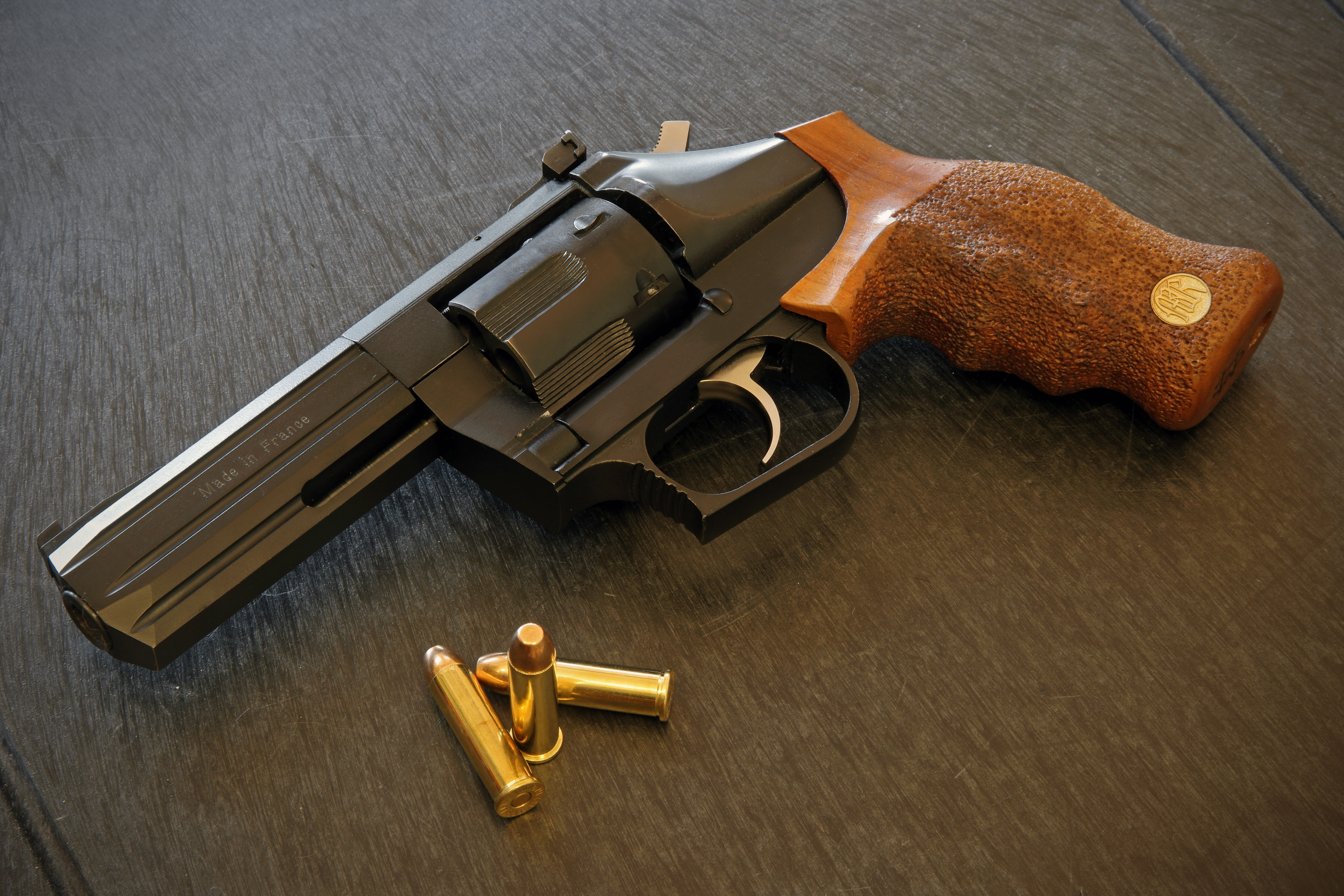
Manurhin MR 93

Manurhin is a trademark used by Chapuis Armes since 1998. It is used to designate the Manurhin MR 73 revolver family, manufactured at Saint-Bonnet-le-Château, France.

The genesis of the term “Manurhin” is Manufacture de Machines du Haut-Rhin founded in 1919 by Julius Spengler (Frenchified by him to Jules Spengler). The trademark was originally held by an earlier designer and manufacturer of the revolver. It now manufactures only military munitions.

== History ==
Manurhin, officially known as Manufacture de Machines du Haut-Rhin, in Haut-Rhin, France started by manufacturing Walther PP, PPK, and PPK/S model pistols in 1952. The guns were imported into the US from 1953 by Tholson Co. and from 1956 by Interarms. In 1984, Manurhin imported their new models directly; they were marked Manurhin on the left front slide assembly. This differs from the previous Walther stamped guns. No Interarms logo appears on the right side.

It is through its production of its revolvers (notably the Manurhin MR 73 used at the time by French National Gendarmerie, as well as for its offensive role and use by French police tactical units such as GIGN and the National Police's RAID) that Manurhin acquired its notoriety.

In 1998, Chapuis Armes purchased Manurhin, and began manufacturing new revolvers at the new Manufacture d. Armes de tir Chapuis facility located in Saint Bonnet Le Chateau, France, using the original Manurhin Equipment 1972–1998, located in Mulhouse, France.

== Models ==
Former models

- Walther P38 - The Mauser plant in Oberndorf, Baden-Württemberg, Germany was captured in April 1945 by the French military. With the captured machines and parts of the Walther P.38 pistols manufactured at this plant kept as war reparations, the French firm Manurhin manufactured these pistols between June 1945 and 1946 in contravention of previously agreed upon Allied regulations. The French pistols had steel grips, an overall grey parkerized finish and were marked with the Mauser production stamp "SVW" and the addition of a French "Rounded Star" stamp on the right side of the slide which indicated a pressure/proof of "Ordinary Smokeless Proof (Powder "T") Pressure". A number of these P.38s were sent to Indochina and ended up in the hands of members of the French Foreign Legion who had served in the Wehrmacht during the war. These pistols have been referred to as "Grey Ghost P38's" due to their appearance.
- Walther P1
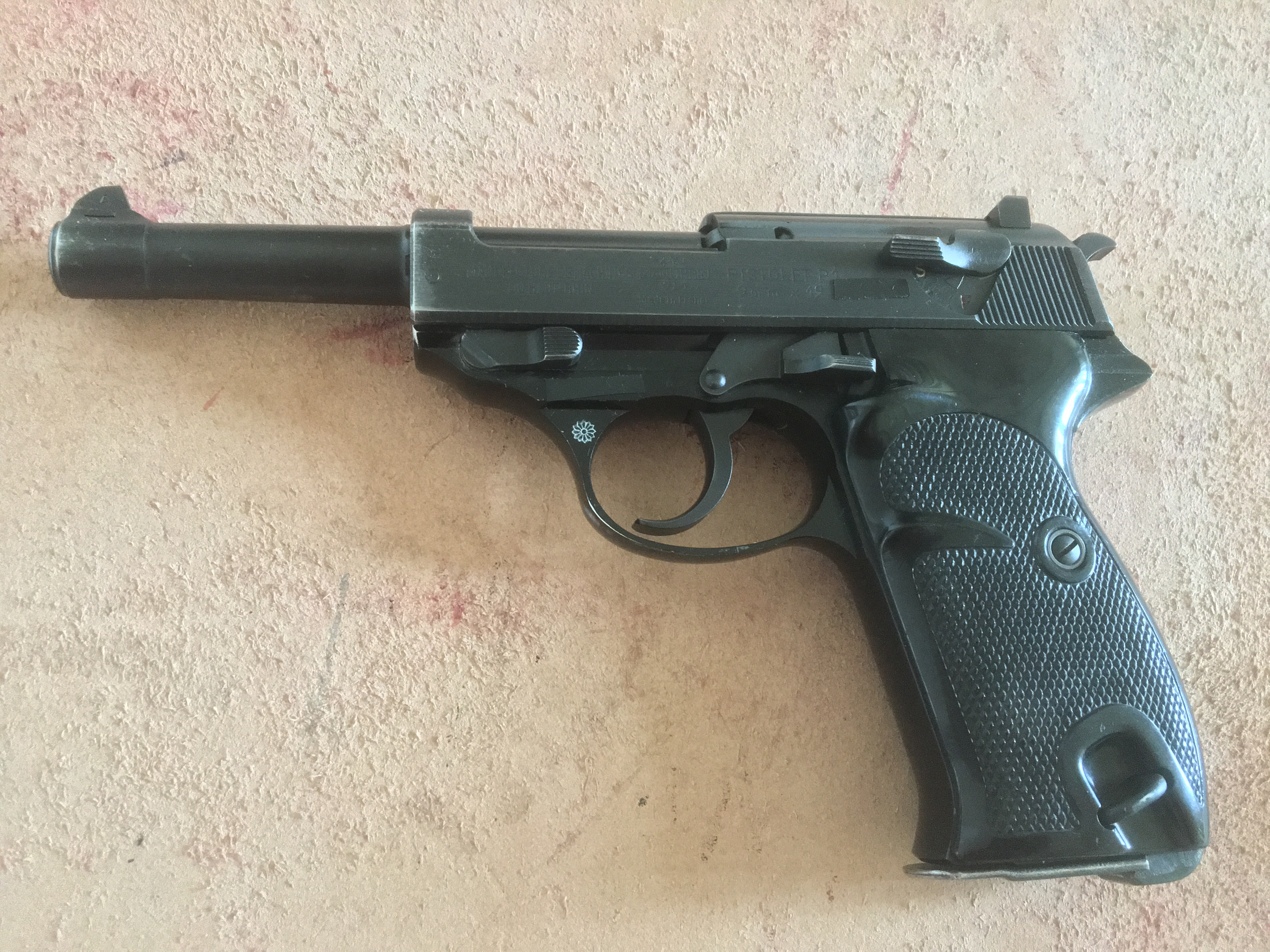
  Manurhin P-1
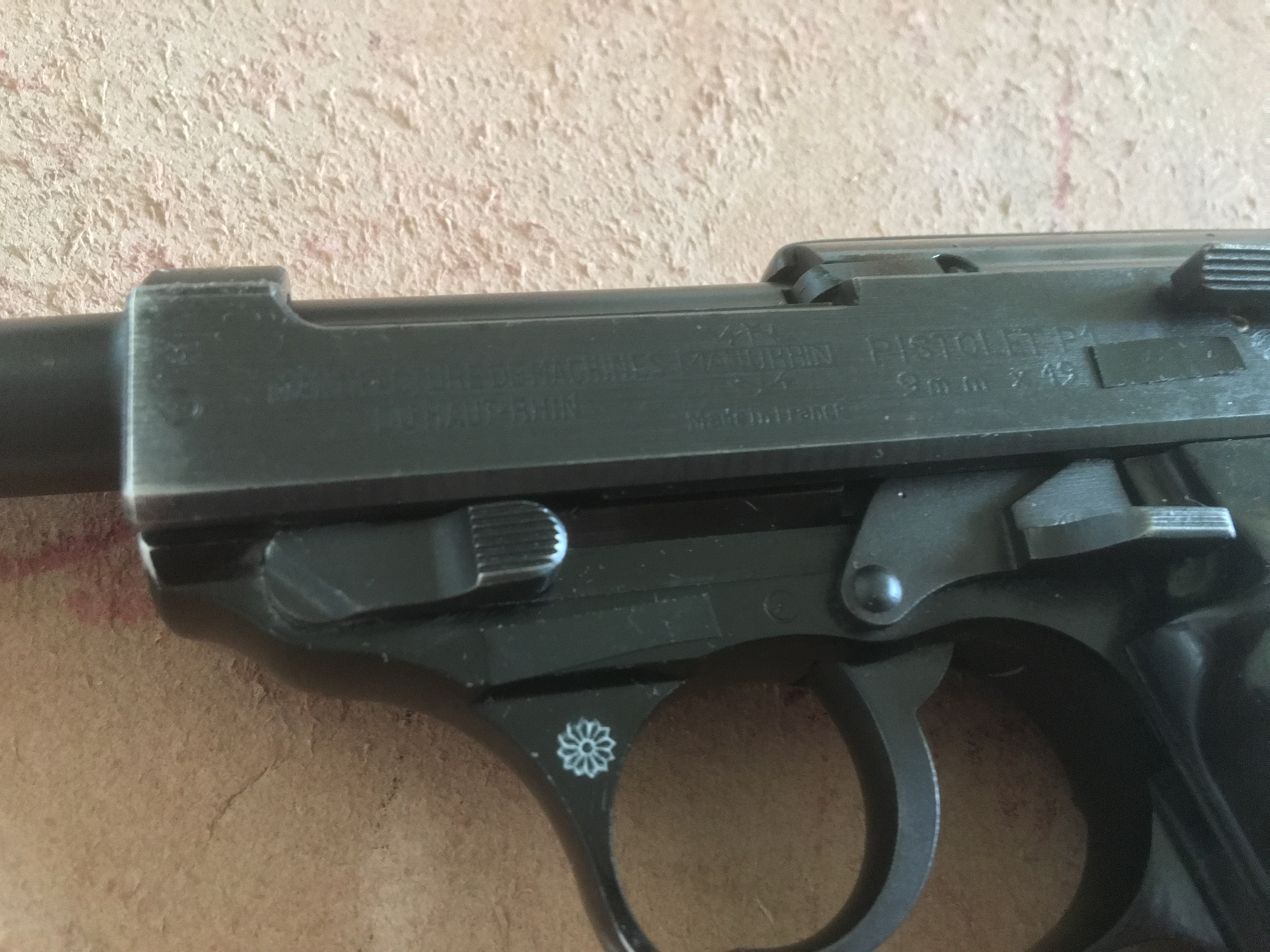
  Manurhin P-1 slide legend
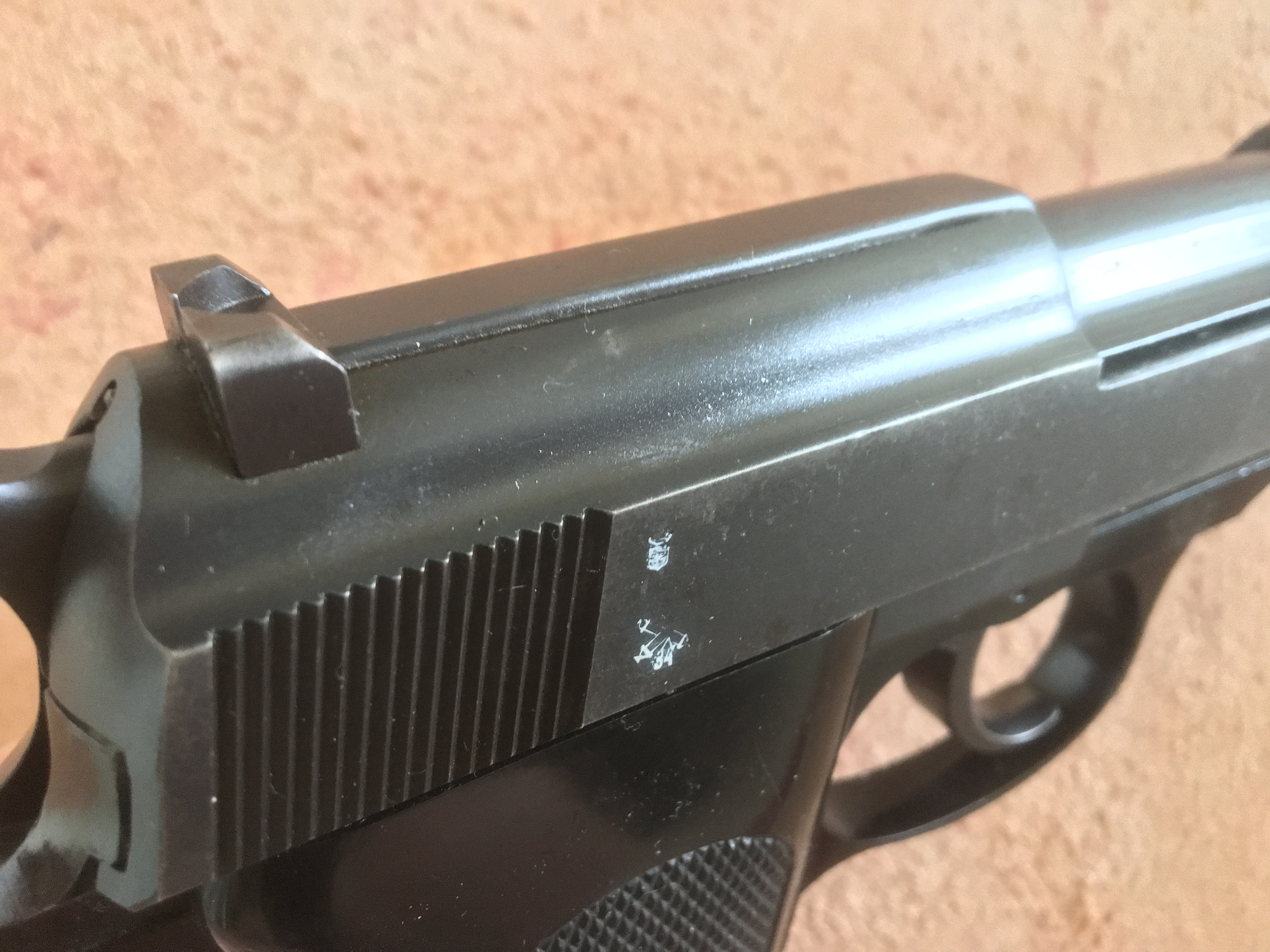
  Manurhin P-1 French Proof Marks
  – West Berlin Police wanted to use Walther P-38s, but were forbidden to carry German-made weapons by treaty. For the West Berlin contract, 2,500 P1 pistols were produced, finished and proofed in France to circumvent the treaty. These pistols featured a chrysanthemum flower on the web of the trigger guard on the left side. Slide legend reads "Manufacture De Machines Du Haut Rhin" with the Manurhin logo above "Made in France", followed by "PISTOLET P1" above "9mm X 19"
- Walther P4 – Manurhin produced 500 of the P4 variation (Similar to the P1/P38, but with a 4" barrel and redesigned slide with no top cover) for the West Berlin police to issue to plainclothes detectives for concealed carry. Slide markings similar to P1.
- Walther PP – Walther's original factory was located in Zella-Mehlis in Thuringia, in present-day eastern Germany which was occupied by the Soviet Union following World War II, Walther established a new factory in Ulm. However, for several years following the war, the Allied powers forbade any manufacture of weapons in Germany. As a result, in 1952, Walther licensed production of the PP series pistols to Manurhin who manufactured the PP series until 1986

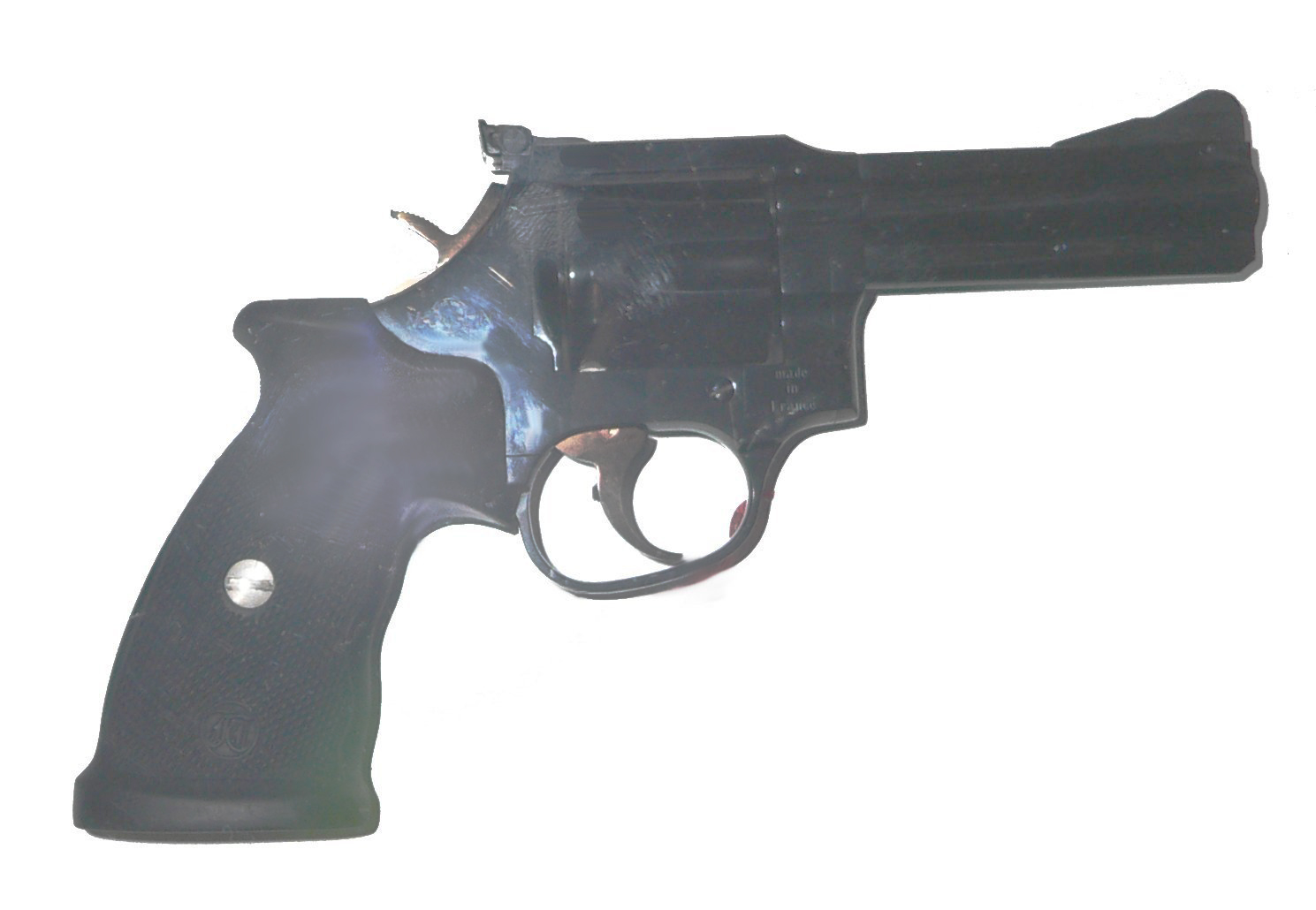
Manurhin-MR-73 .357 Magnum revolver

Current models

- Manurhin MR 73 – double-action revolver chambered in .38 Special/.357 Magnum. The revolver can be converted to 9mm Parabellum with a supplied replacement cylinder. Currently being imported into the US by Beretta USA.

== Scooters ==
Starting in 1952 Manhurin produced the German DKW Hobby scooter by incorporating locally made components and rebranding it as the Manurhin MR75 in Europe and the Concord in the UK. According to Bonhams the MR 75 “was constructed to a high standard and must have been one of the first motorcycles to be painted electrostatically, a process commonly known as ‘powder coating’. When DKW ceased production of the Hobby, Manurhin continued with its version, which in 1957 had the third highest sales for European scooters behind Lambretta and Vespa.”

== See also ==
- Manufacture d'armes de Châtellerault
- Manufacture d'armes de Saint-Étienne
- RMR (revolver)
