= National Police Intervention Force =

French police operational structure

- Force d’intervention de la police nationale (French)
- Active: 2009–present
- Country: France
- Agency: National Police
- Type: Police tactical unit coordination
- Role: Counter-terrorism
- Abbreviation: FIPN

Structure
- Officers: 500
- Bases: Bièvres, Lille, Strasbourg, Lyon, Marseille, Nice, Bordeaux, Rennes, Paris, Pointe à Pitre, Nouméa, Saint-Denis de la Réunion

Commanders
- Notable commanders: Amaury de Hauteclocque; Jean-Michel Fauvergue

The National Police Intervention Force (FIPN) (French: Force d'Intervention de la Police nationale) is an operational structure that coordinates various police tactical units of the French National Police. When activated, it is composed of RAID and its seven regional branches, BRI-BAC, the Anticommando brigade of the Paris Research and Intervention Brigade and the three GIPN units based overseas. The RAID commander assumes operational command of FIPN upon activation.

== History ==
In 2004, French commissary Christian Lambert put forward a project to create a unified command structure for the various anti-terrorist intervention groups in existence in the French National Police. The project was not immediately implemented, but the 2008 Mumbai attacks, providing an example of the sort of incident the project was designed to thwart, gave an impetus for the founding of the structure.

From 2008, RAID, the Paris BRI-BAC and the various regional units then-known as GIPNs started a training program to adopt common methods. The FIPN was then founded on 1 December 2009 when Minister of the Interior Brice Hortefeux visited the RAID home base at Bièvres. In 2010, the BRIs joined the structure. The organisation of the FIPN was officially determined by the ministerial decision ("arrêté" of 5 January 2011, notably giving the GIPNs a nationwide jurisdiction.

In March 2015, the seven metropolitan GIPN units have become RAID regional branches (French: Antennes RAID).

The FIPN is designed to intervene on hostage crisis and in close quarters. Its assault teams include physicians, providing for the immediate care of wounded personnel or suspects on the field.
