= RMR =

RMR may refer to:

- RMR (revolver), a .357 double-action revolver
- RMR (singer), an American singer and rapper
- RMR layout (of an automobile), see rear mid-engine, rear-wheel-drive layout
- Recife Metropolitan Region in Northeastern Brazil
- Recurring monthly revenue, a measure of customer attrition
- Registered Merit Reporter, a certification offered by the National Court Reporters Association
- Reliability must run, a contract in an electrical market
- Resting metabolic rate, see basal metabolic rate
- Revelstoke Mountain Resort, a Canadian ski resort located in Revelstoke, British Columbia
- Rick Mercer Report, a Canadian comedy television series
- Robust mouse rejuvenation, rejuvenating an elderly mouse so that its remaining life expectancy is doubled
- Rock mass rating, a rock mass classification system (geotechnical engineering)
- RockMyRun, a running/workout mobile app
- Royal Marines Reserve, the volunteer reserve force used to augment the regular Royal Marines
- The Royal Montreal Regiment, a Canadian Forces infantry regiment based in Montreal
- Ruggedized miniature reflex (optics), a type of weapon-mounted red dot sight for guns
