= Central Directorate of Public Security =

Branch of the French police involved in keeping public order in large towns

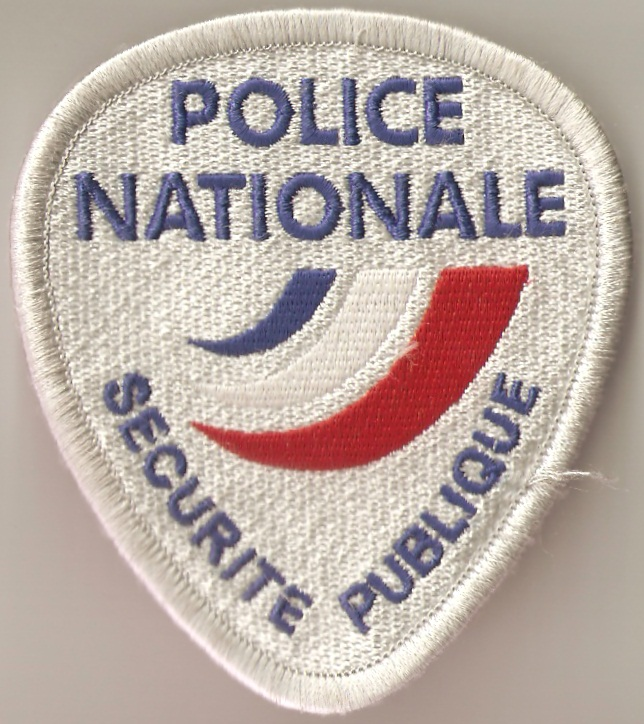
Patch of the Direction centrale de la Sécurité publique

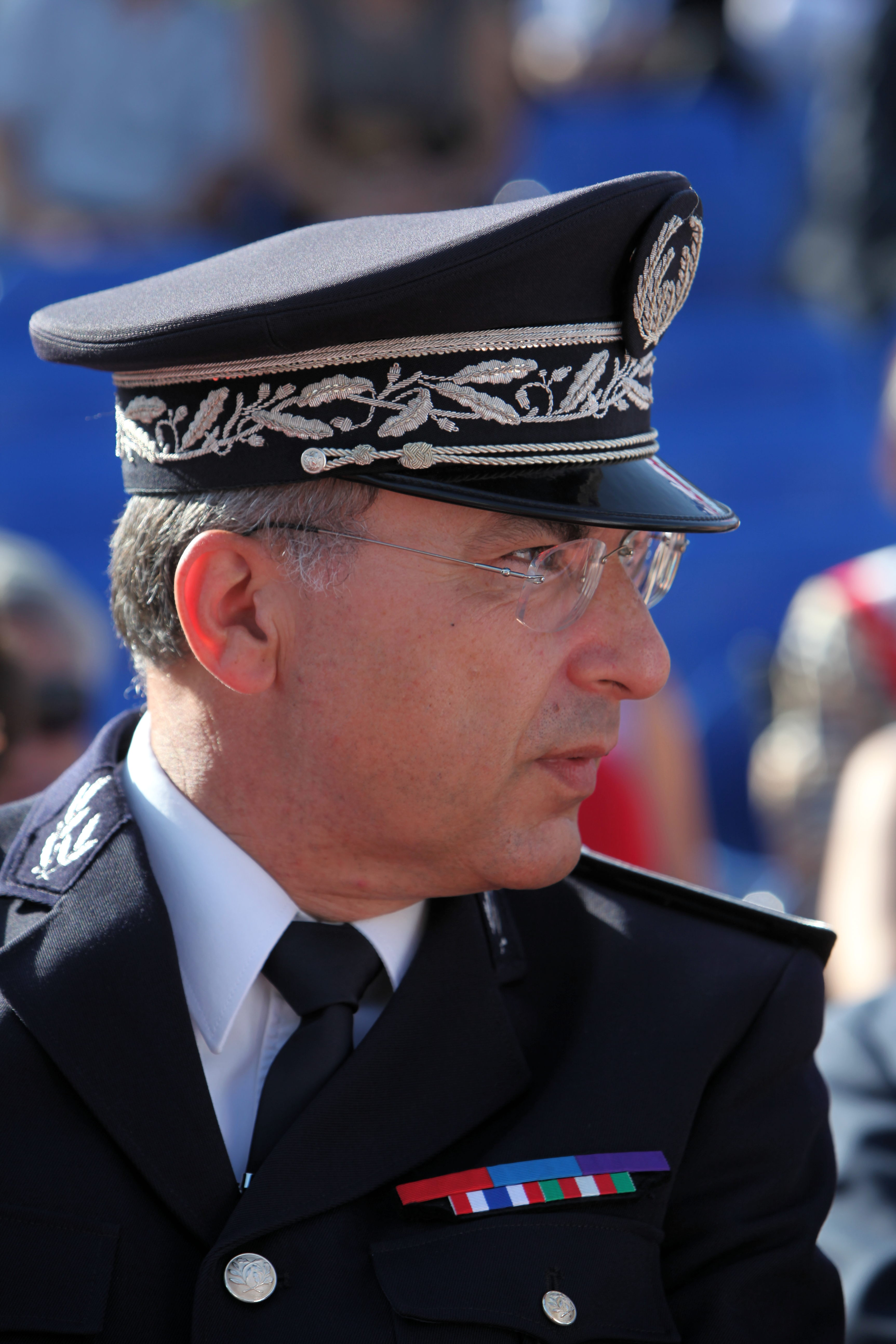
Commissaire Pascal Lalle, promoted to Directeur Central de la Sécurité Publique at the Council of Ministers of 18 July 2012.

The Central Directorate of Public Security (DCSP) (French: Direction Centrale de la Sécurité Publique) is the uniformed patrol and response arm of the French National Police (Police Nationale) responsible for keeping the peace and maintaining public order in the cities and large towns of France. It was established on 23 April 1941, and its current structure operates under the Decree of 23 December 1993.

The DCSP consists of over 78,000 mainly uniformed police personnel known as Gardiens de la Paix ("Guardians of the Peace") deployed in 102 Départemental directorates with 462 Urban Offices. They provide general police services, including crime prevention, patrol, and response to calls for assistance. It maintains a small plainclothes corps who investigates local crimes; these are organised into Criminal Brigades.

The DCSP also deploys 9 Groupes d'Intervention de la Police Nationale (GIPN), intervention units similar to the Recherche Assistance Intervention Dissuasion (RAID) team (which is directly under orders of the Direction Générale de la Police Nationale).

There are also dog units, boat units, and an air wing.
