= Ange Mancini =

French politician

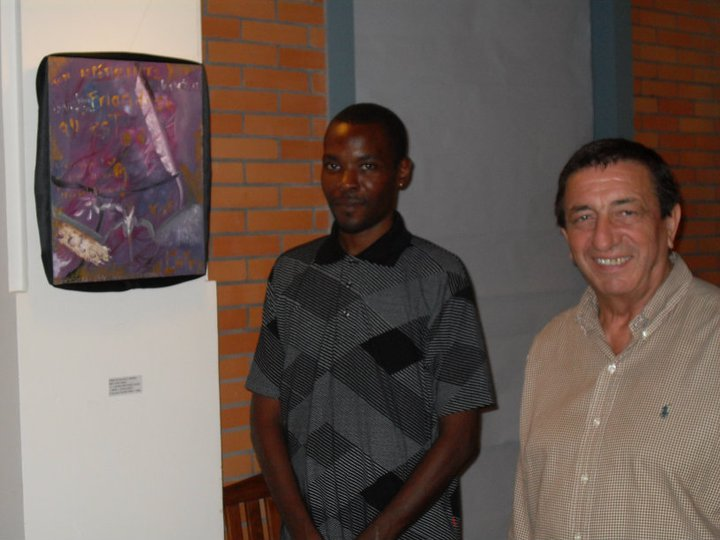
Ange Mancini (right)

Ange Mancini (born 15 June 1944, Beausoleil, Alpes-Maritimes) is the French intelligence national coordinator.

== Biography ==
His father was a bricklayer from Italy. In 1963, he started a career in the National Police. In 1983, he served as the head of the Service régional de police judiciaire of Ajaccio. In 1985, he created the Recherche Assistance Intervention Dissuasion (RAID). He served as its first head from 1985 to 1990. In 1987, he helped arrest members of Action directe in the Loiret. From 1990 to 1995, he served as the head of the SRPJ of Versailles. He then served as the Deputy Head of the Direction centrale de la police judiciaire until 1996.

From 1999 to 2002, he served as deputy prefect for security of Corse-du-Sud and Haute-Corse. He served as the prefect of French Guiana from 2002 to 2006, then of Landes, and later as Prefect of Martinique since 2007.

He enjoys golf, cross-country cycling, and hunting.

Ange Mancini French Prefects Born: 15 June 1944
Political offices
Preceded by	Prefect of French Guiana; 2002 – 2006	Succeeded by
Preceded by	Prefect of Landes (departement); 2006 – 2007	Succeeded by {{{after}}}
Preceded by Yves Dassonville	Prefect of Martinique; 2007 – Ongoing	Still holding
