= Search and Intervention Brigade =

French National Police tactical unit

- Brigade de recherche et d'intervention (French)
- Logo featuring a gargoyle
- Active: 1964 – present
- Country: France
- Agency: National Police
- Type: Police tactical unit
- Role: Counter-terrorism; Law enforcement
- Common name: Anti-Gang Brigades
- Abbreviation: BRI

Commanders
- Notable commanders: Robert Broussard (Paris BRI)

Notables
- Significant operation(s): 2015 Charlie Hebdo shooting; November 2015 Paris attacks

The Search and Intervention Brigade (French: Brigade de recherche et d'intervention, BRI,; also known as the Investigation and Intervention Brigade or Anti-Gang Brigade) is a unit of the French National Police. The first units were formed in 1964 and carried out their tasks under the command of the Paris prefecture.

BRIs are specialized in serious criminal cases such as armed robbery and kidnappings. They typically attempt to catch offenders in the act after monitoring their activities, a technique that was first experimented with in the 1960s by the then-new Paris BRI. They use a mix of traditional techniques and modern technology to collect and archive data about banditry. Although most of the pictures illustrating this article show uniformed officers (of the Paris BRI-PP) during a hostage-rescue public demonstration, most BRI missions are undertaken by plain clothed officers. There are now more than 15 BRI units, located in France's major cities. The first of them, the Paris BRI (or BRI-PP for Préfecture de Police), was created in 1964.

In 1972, in the wake of the Munich massacre, it was decided that BRI-PP would, as an additional task, form the nucleus of a police tactical task force known as Brigade Anticommando (Counter-commando Brigade) or BRI-BAC. BRI-BAC, when activated, is reinforced by other specialised units of the Préfecture de police. It has been involved in the resolution of hostage crises from its beginnings in the early 1970s to the Porte de Vincennes siege in January 2015 and the "Bataclan" assault during the November 2015 Paris attacks. In the Porte de Vincennes case, BRI-BAC and the National Police's RAID operated together as part of the National Police Intervention Force (French: Force d'Intervention de la Police nationale or FIPN).

== History ==
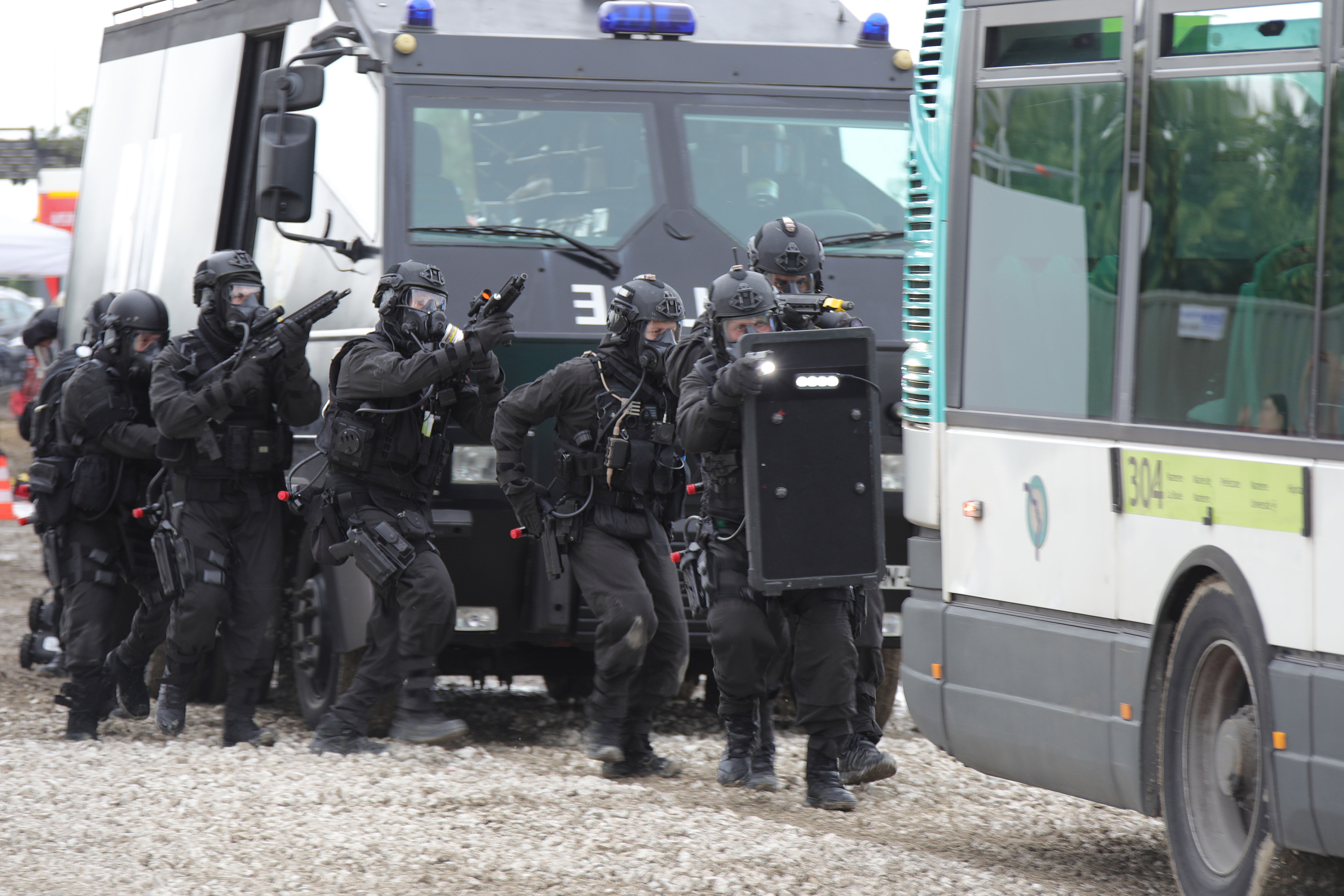
Hostage rescue demonstration - Paris BRI-PP - June 2018

The first BRI, BRI-PP was created in Paris in 1964. François le Mouël, a police commissary with the Paris Police Prefecture (PP), suggested that there were situations when, instead of waiting until a crime had been committed to start an inquiry, the police could achieve better results by keeping a close watch on known or suspected criminals and/or some of their potential targets. The criminals would then be arrested - either just before the crime took place or soon after but never during the action itself - so that there would be enough evidence for prosecution while avoiding the risks of shoot-outs and innocent victims. Initially set up as a new section in one of the PP's Directorate of Judiciary Police brigades, BRI became a separate brigade in 1967, still under le Mouël's leadership.

The Paris BRI method was innovative enough so that it was widely copied all around France and in other European countries. One of the better-known BRI successes was achieved in 1977 when the captors of banker Gérard Mallet, who had been under surveillance for more than four months, were arrested less than four hours after they had committed their crime.

== Missions ==
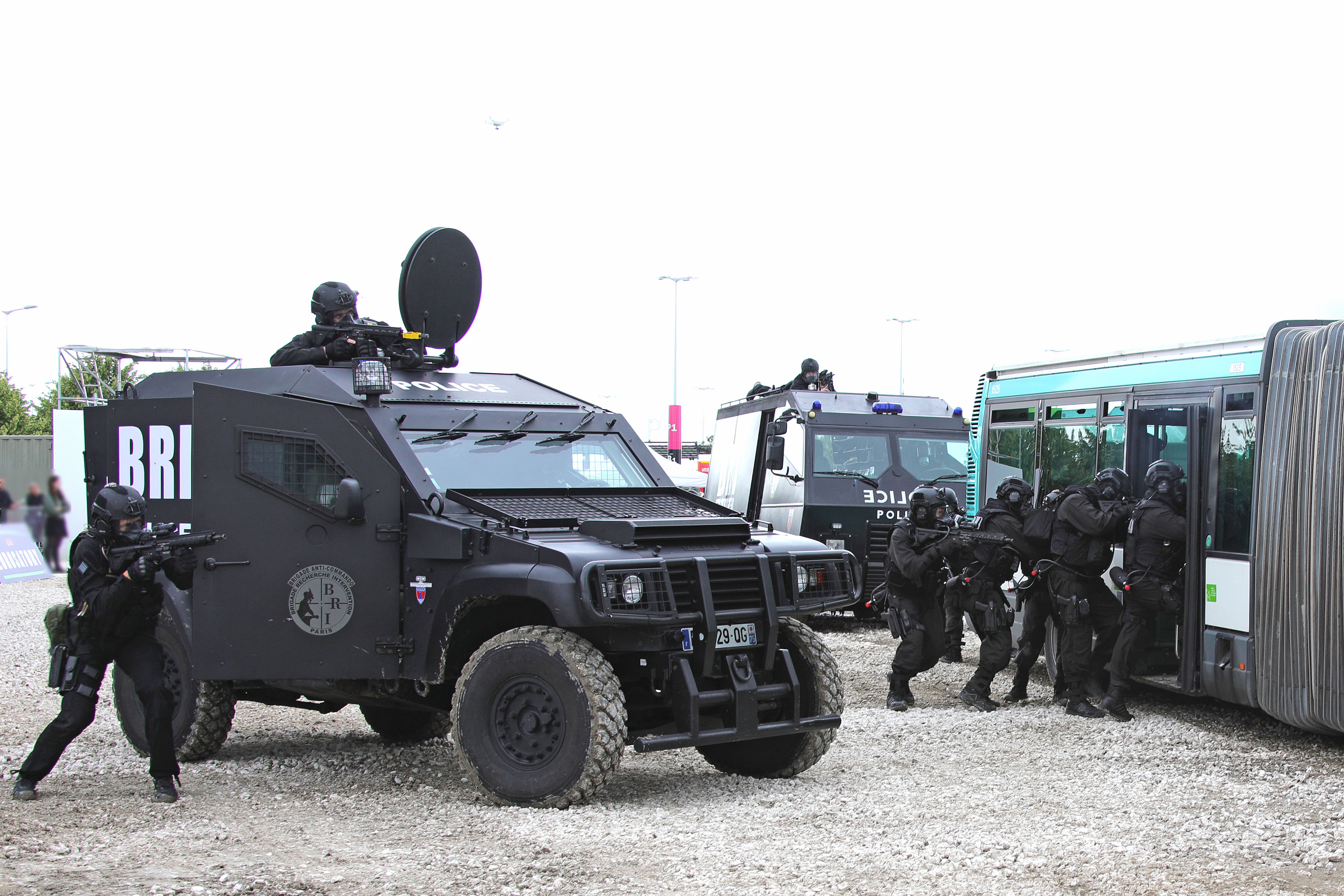
Hostage rescue demonstration - Paris BRI-PP - June 2018

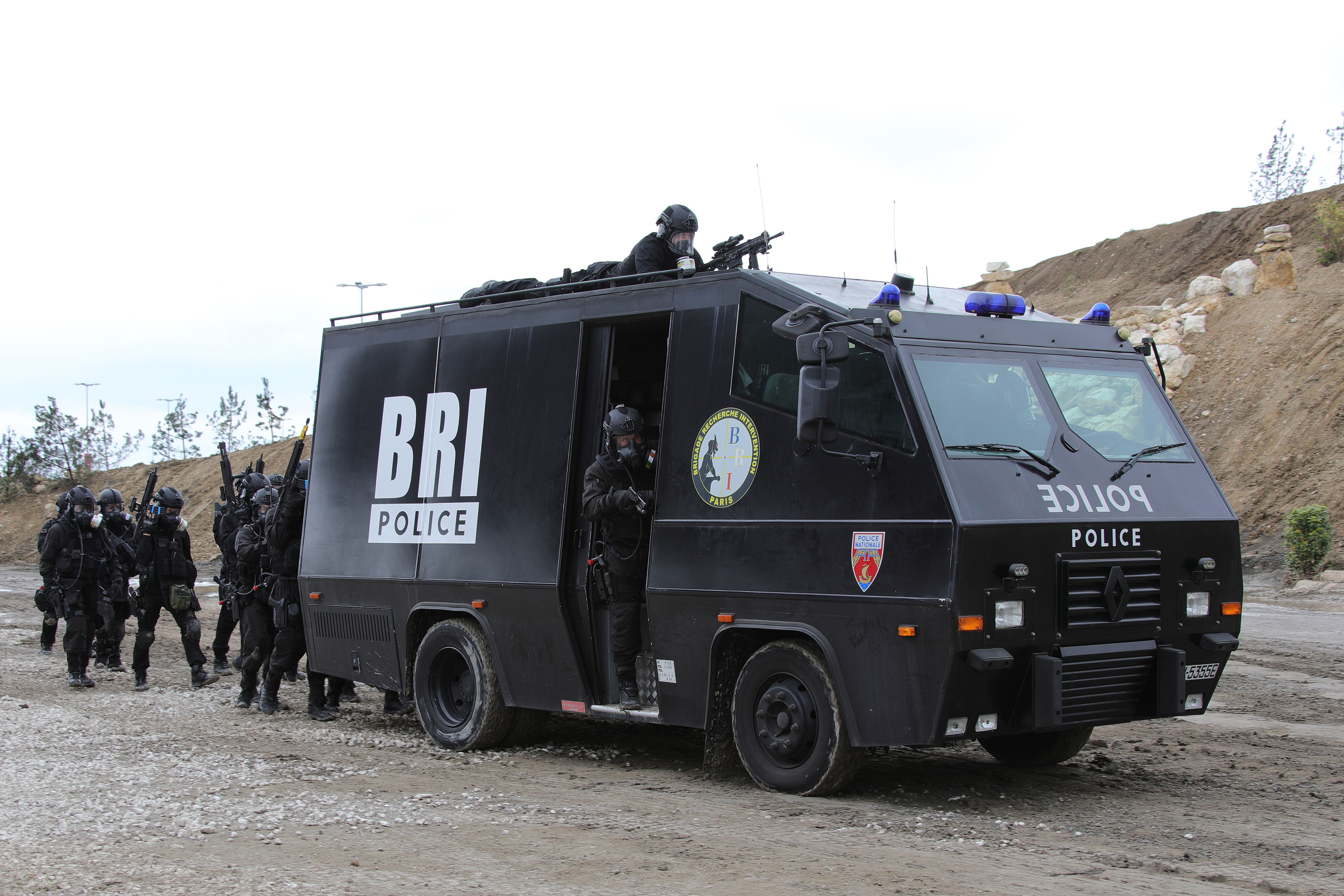
BRI-PP armored truck and hostage rescue team during a demonstration - June 2018

- All BRI units - including Paris BRI-PP : Judiciary police work with an emphasis on flagrante delicto cases. All BRIs can set up special response teams in case of a terrorist attack.
- Paris BRI (BRI-PP) when activated as BRI-BAC (French: brigade anticommando): crisis response in hostage and terrorism cases. When activated, "brigade anticommando", becomes one of three French national response teams, together with the Police nationale's RAID, and the Gendarmerie nationale's GIGN

== Organization ==
Logo of the BRI of Bayonne

BRI-BAC, GIGN and RAID (2019).

The BRIs are regular law enforcement units of the French National Police, which has jurisdiction over the whole French territory. The only exceptions are the Paris and Bouches-du-Rhône Prefectures of Police, which, because they are major cities and - in the case of Paris - the nation's capital, have autonomous police authority governing bodies directly subordinated to the French Minister of the Interior.

Unlike RAID which is a special response team directly subordinated to the Director general of the National police, BRIs are parts of the French criminal police. Their main mission is the arrest of violent criminals. As members of the judiciary police, BRI officers normally operate in plain clothes for most missions. Hoods are used to ensure anonymity during some of these missions.

Command and coordination between the Paris BRI-PP and RAID in response to acts of terror, is entrusted to a task force called National Police Intervention Force, headed by the RAID commander, and which is only activated if a major crisis occurs.

As of 2018 there are the Paris BRI, two national and several regional BRI units, independent from one another:

- Paris Police Prefecture
  - Direction Régionale de Police Judiciaire de Paris
    - Brigade de recherche et d'intervention - Préfecture de police (BRI-PP) - the Paris unit. It is the first BRI unit and as such the precursor of the other units. It becomes Brigade Anticommando (BRI-BAC) in case of a security crisis.
- Central Directorate of the Judicial Police
  - National BRIs
    - Brigade de recherche et d'intervention - Nationale (BRI-NAT) - based in Nanterre (near Paris) in support of inquiries conducted at the national level.
    - Brigade de recherche et d'investigation - Financières nationales (BRI-FN) - attached to the financial crime directorate of the National Police
  - Interregional Directorate of the Judicial Police Lyon (DIPJ Lyon) - BRI Lyon
  - Interregional Directorate of the Judicial Police Marseille (DIPJ Marseille) - BRI Marseille
    - Nice Branch of the Interregional Directorate of the Judicial Police Marseille (DIPJ Marseille – antenne PJ Nice) - BRI Nice
    - Regional Service of the Judicial Police Montpellier (SRPJ Montpellier) - BRI Montpellier
  - Interregional Directorate of the Judicial Police Rennes (DIPJ Rennes)
    - Nantes Branch of the Interregional Directorate of the Judicial Police Rennes (DIPJ Rennes – antenne PJ Nantes) - BRI Nantes
    - Regional Service of the Judicial Police Rouen (DIPJ Rennes – SRPJ Rouen) - BRI Rouen
  - Interregional Directorate of the Judicial Police Lille (DIPJ Lille) - BRI Lille
  - Regional Service of the Judicial Police Versailles (DRPJ Versailles) - BRI Versailles
  - Interregional Directorate of the Judicial Police Strasbourg (DIPJ Strasbourg) - BRI Strasbourg
  - Interregional Directorate of the Judicial Police Bordeaux (DIPJ Bordeaux) - BRI Bordeaux (with a branch team in Bayonne)
    - Regional Service of the Judicial Police Toulouse (DIPJ Bordeaux – SRPJ Toulouse) - BRI Toulouse
  - Regional Service of the Judicial Police Ajaccio (DRPJ Ajaccio) - BRI Ajaccio (with a branch team in Bastia)
  - Interregional Directorate of the Judicial Police Orléans (DIPJ Orléans) - BRI Orléans

== BRI-PP commanders ==
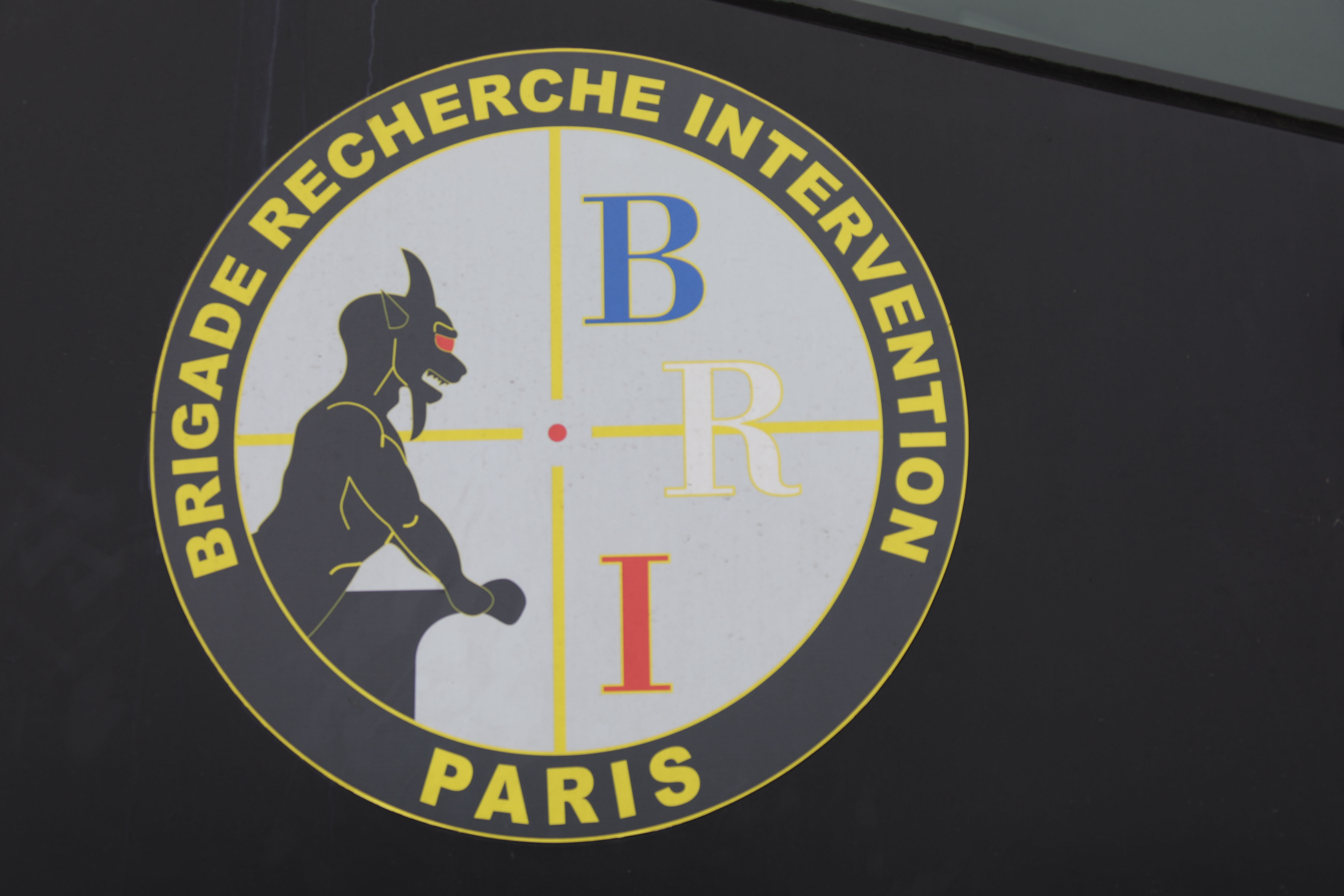
Paris BRI-PP logo on an armored truck

- François Le Mouël (1964 - 1971) [Section de recherche et d'intervention until 1967, then BRI.]
- Jean Sautereau (1971-1974)
- Marcel Leclerc (1974-1978)
- Robert Broussard (1978-1982)
- René-Georges Querry (1982-1983)
- Claude Cancès (1983-1987)
- Pierre Cavin (1987-1989)
- Jean-Marc Bloch (1989-1996)
- Yves Jobic (1996-2001)
- Jean-Jacques Herlem (2001-2003)
- Christian Flaesch (2003-2004)
- Pascal Carreau (2004-2008)
- Michel Faury (2008-2013)
- Christophe Molmy (2013-2021)
- Simon Riondet (Current)

== In popular culture ==
- The 1979 film The Police War depicts the rivalry between the Territorial Brigade and the Anti-Gang Brigade.
- The Paris BRI-PP is featured in the 2004 film 36 Quai des Orfèvres and in the famous TV series Spiral (Engrenages).
- The 2020 Netflix production Rogue City
- The 2021 Netflix production Lupin features BRI in some episodes.

== See also ==
- List of police tactical units
- Brigade de répression du banditisme
- Unité de coordination de la lutte anti-terroriste
- Service de Protection des Hautes Personnalités
