= Georges Nguyen Van Loc =

French policeman, actor and author

- Born: 2 April 1933; Marseille, France
- Died: 7 December 2008 (aged 75); Cannes, France
- Occupation: Policeman

Georges Nguyen Van Loc (2 April 1933 – 7 December 2008) was a French policeman, actor, and author.

Van Loc worked as a policeman, police inspector and commissioner in his native Marseille for many years. He later wrote an autobiography about his career as a police officer and played himself in a television series based on his life. He created the first GIPN. He was nicknamed "le Chinois" ("the Chinese") despite his Vietnamese descent.

== Career ==
Of Vietnamese descent, Georges Nguyen Van Loc was born in the Panier district in Marseille, in a working class environment. He spent his childhood in Marseille and he got his contacts with the future godfathers of the Marseille milieu, in particular Gaëtan Zampa aka Tany Zampa .

Georges Nguyen Van Loc began his career in the police force in Algeria, at CRS 203 unit in Oran (created February 28, 1957), as a Peace Officer. He had already been in this country during his military service.

Dubbed the "Chinese", he created in 1972 the first National Police Intervention Groups (GIPN) unit. Setup first in Marseilles, its purpose is to fight against organized crime or terrorism and manage crisis situations: madmen, hostages, escorts or riots. An anecdote among many recounts that, at the beginning of the 1980s, he and his team dressed up as nurses to arrest a drug addict who was holding his mother hostage, in a building in Marseille. The divisional commissioner Van Loc commanded the GIPN of Marseille for more than fifteen years and successfully handled the most difficult situations. One of his pride was not to have on his account any death on duty of the police officers in his teams. He retired in 1989.

After writing autobiographical novels, from volume 1 Le Chinois in 1989 to volume 6 in 2006, he played his own character in the television series Van Loc, of which he was the main character from 1992 to 1998.

It was parodied by the Robins des Bois in a recurring sketch where Pierre-François Martin-Laval plays Van Loc during the filming of the TV series.

== Death ==
Van Loc died of a heart attack in Cannes, France on 7 December 2008 at 0:45, aged 75. He is buried in Saint-Pierre cemetery in Marseille (18 square western center 1 st rank 23).

== Distinctions ==
- Knight of the Legion of Honor
- Knight of the Ordre national du Mérite
- Cross of Military Valor with Citation to the Order of the Division
- Combatant's Cross
- Commemorative medal for security operations and maintenance of order in Algeria
- Gold medal for feats of courage and dedication from the Ministry of the Interior
- Medal of Honor of the National Police for exceptional circumstances
- Medal of the Wounded
- Medal of the National Assembly
- Senate medal

== Works authored ==
- Le Chinois Tome 1: Le Chinois, 1989 Presses de la Cité, (ISBN 2258026156)
- Triangle d'or, 1992 Presses de la Cité, (ISBN 2258033586)
- Le Chinois: La peau d'un caïd, 1994 Presses de la Cité, (ISBN 2258038324)
- Affaires criminelles, 1995 Presses de la Cité, (ISBN 225804037X)
- Le Chinois: Les marchands de venin, 1995 Presses de la Cité, (ISBN 2258040361)
- Le troisième juge, 1996 Presses de la Cité, (ISBN 225804412X)
- Meurtres au soleil, 1996 Presses de la Cité, (ISBN 2258044138)
- Le Chinois: Les aviseurs, 1997 Presses de la Cité, (ISBN 2258047498)
- Vengeance transversale, 2002 Ramsay, (ISBN 2841144372)
- Van Loc, 2004 Autres Temps, (ISBN 2845211686)
- Les Marchands de venin, 2004 Autres Temps, (ISBN 2845211708)
- La peau d'un caïd, 2004 Autres Temps, (ISBN 2845211694)
- Paroles d'homme, 2005 Autres Temps, (ISBN 2845212291)
- Le Chinois Tome 6: Le Crépuscule des voyous, 2006 Autres Temps, (ISBN 284521250X)

== Filmography ==
- Van Loc (9 episodes), in which he plays his own role:
  - 30 January 1992 : Van Loc, le flic de Marseille
  - 25 March 1993 : La Grenade
  - 2 December 1993 : La Vengeance
  - 21 November 1994 : L'Affaire Da Costa
  - 1995 : Le Grand Casse
  - 14 December 1995 : Victoire aux poings
  - 8 January 1997 : Ennemis d'enfance
  - 16 January 1997 : Pour l'amour de Marie
  - 8 January 1998 : La Relève
