= RMR (revolver) =

Handgun

The RMR was a double-action revolver chambered for .357 Magnum cartridges chosen by the French National Police to replace the Manurhin MR 73. Production was a joint venture between Manurhin and Sturm, Ruger & Co. and ran from 1981 to 1984.

== Description ==
In order to produce a more affordable revolver, Manurhin signed an agreement with the American firearms manufacturer Sturm, Ruger & Co., which specializes in micro-fusion and investment casting, processes which are less expensive than machining firearm parts from blocks of forged steel. The resulting weapon was the RMR, with a frame and mechanism made by Ruger, and the barrel and cylinder made by Manurhin similar to the Manurhin MR 73. Production was small and the gun was replaced by the Manurhin Special Police F1 (SP F1).
