= Christian Lambert =

French civil servant (1946–2026)

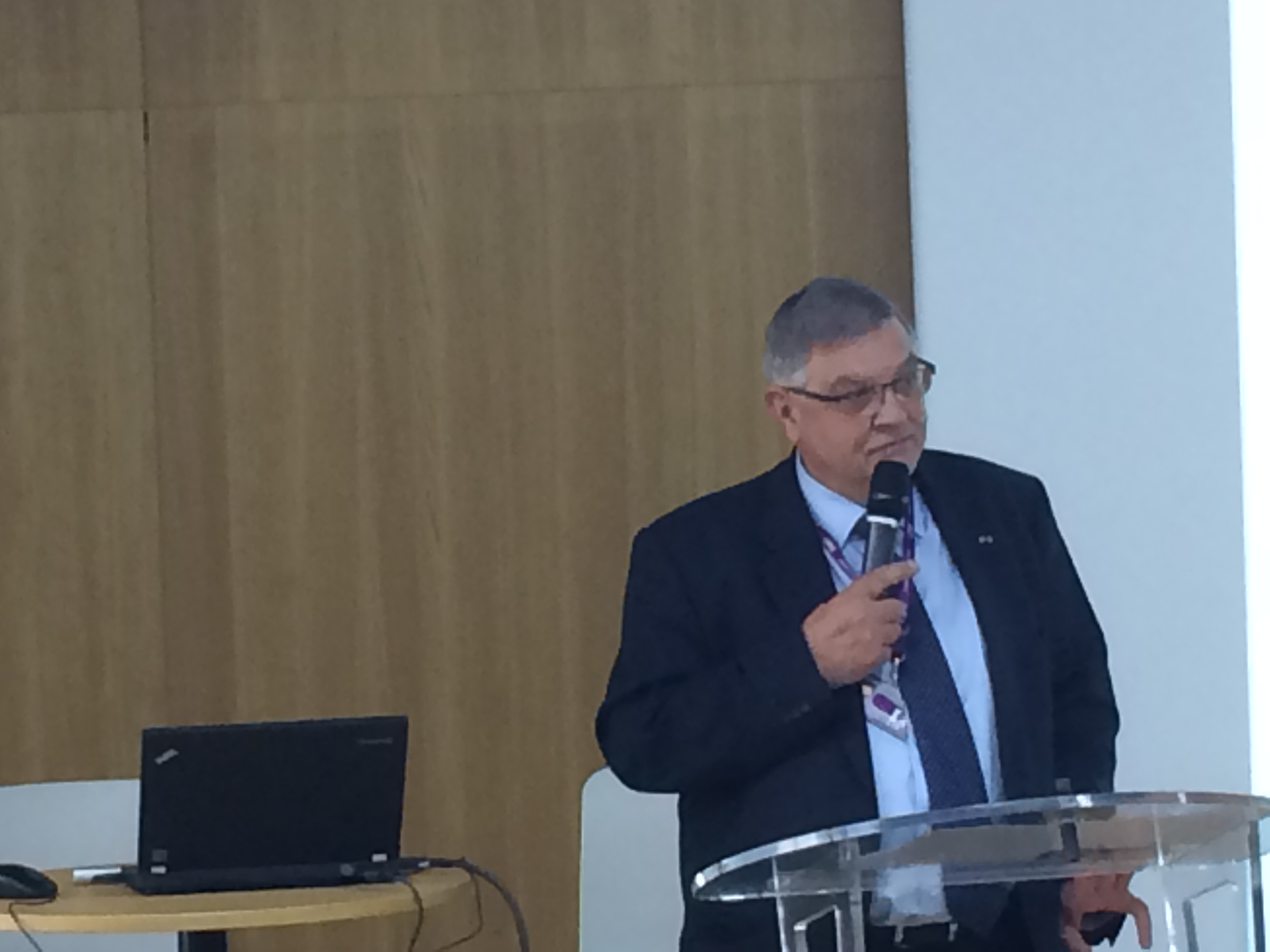
- Lambert in 2016

Prefect of Seine-Saint-Denis
- In office 8 April 2010 – June 2013
- Preceded by: Nacer Meddah
- Succeeded by: Philippe Galli

Chief of Staff of the Paris Police Prefecture
- In office 9 July 2007 – 14 April 2010

Central director of the Compagnies Républicaines de Sécurité
- In office 16 October 2005 – 9 July 2007

Division manager of RAID
- In office 1 October 2002 – 26 July 2004

Personal details
- Born: 5 June 1946 Corbeil-Essonnes, France
- Died: 2 July 2026 (aged 80)
- Education: École nationale supérieure de la Police
- Occupation: Civil servant

Christian Lambert (French: [kʁistjˈɑ̃ lɑ̃bˈɛʁ]; 5 June 1946 – 2 July 2026) was a French civil servant.

== Life and career ==
Born in Corbeil-Essonnes on 5 June 1946, Lambert began his career as a firefighter and subsequently a police officer. From 2002 to 2004, he was division manager of RAID, a French police unit. In 2005, he was awarded the gold Médaille d'honneur de l'administration pénitentiaire. From 2005 to 2007, he was central director of the Compagnies Républicaines de Sécurité. From 2007 to 2010, he was Chief of Staff of the Paris Police Prefecture. From 2010 to 2013, he served as prefect of Seine-Saint-Denis. He was able to obtain this position despite being over the age of 65 due to a legislative amendment. His appointment was met with mild opposition by left-wing groups due to his lengthy police career, including by Île-de-France regional councillor Stéphane Gatignon. After he left the prefecture, he became an advisor to interior minister Manuel Valls. In November 2015, he became director of security for SNCF, a role he held until May 2017.

Lambert died on 2 July 2026, at the age of 80.
