= Manurhin MR 73 =

Manurhin MR–73
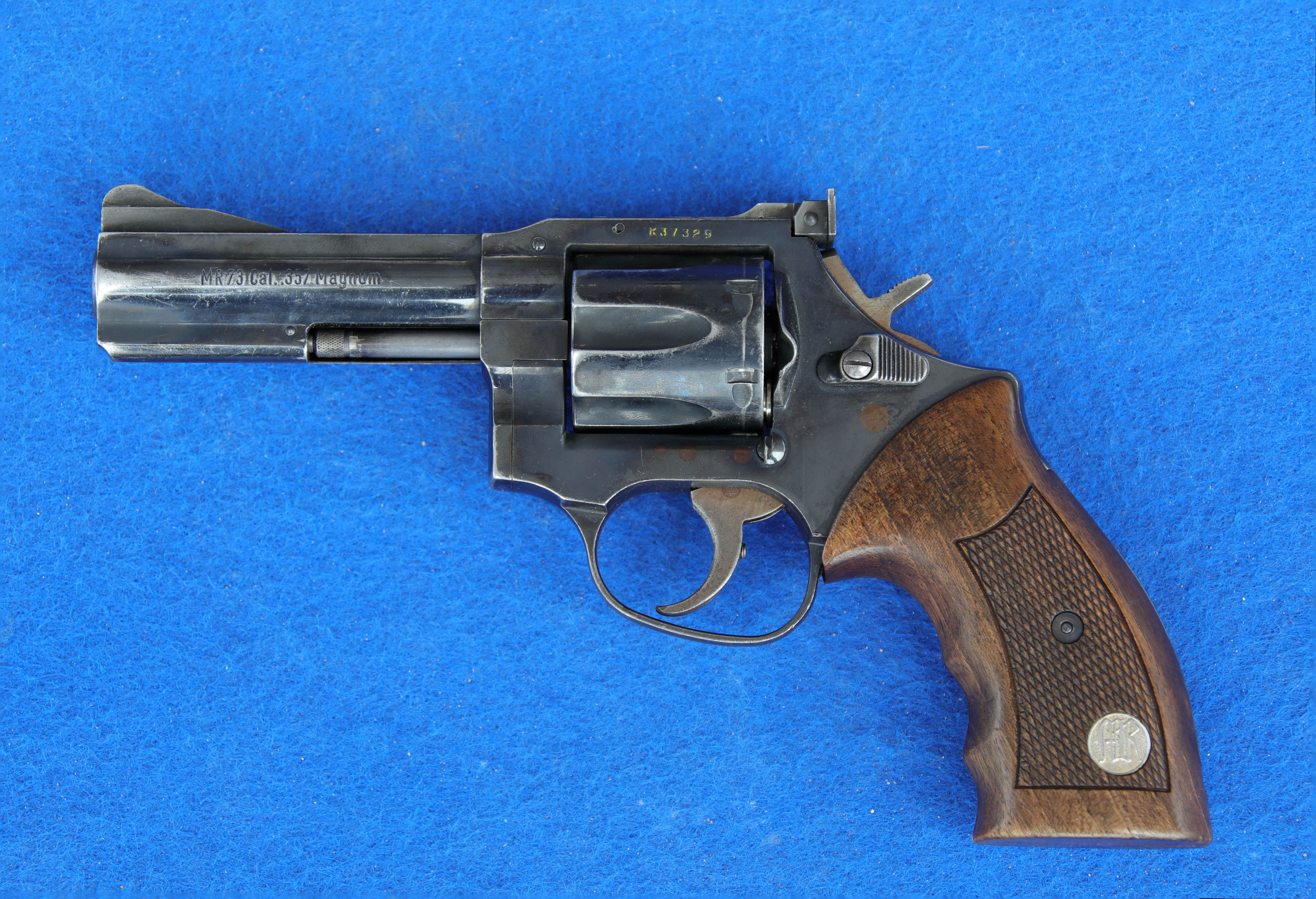
- Manurhin MR 73 4" in .357 Magnum caliber.
- Type: Revolver
- Place of origin: France

Service history
- Used by: See Users

Production history
- Designer: Gilbert Albert René Maillard
- Designed: 1972
- Manufacturer: Manurhin
- Produced: 1972–present (Note: The MR 73 was produced at the original Manurhin factory in Mulhouse until 1998, when Chapuis Armes purchased the company and moved production to its own facilities in Saint-Bonnet-le-Château.)
- Variants: Manurhin MR 88, Manurhin MR 93, Manurhin MR 96, Manurhin F1, Gendarmerie, Sport, Match

Specifications
- Mass: 880 g (31.0 oz) (2.5"); 950 g (33.5 oz) (4"); 1,030 g (36.3 oz) (5.25")
- Length: 195 mm (7.7 in); 205 mm (8.1 in); 233 mm (9.2 in)
- Barrel length: 2.25 in (57.2 mm); 2.75 in (69.9 mm); 3 in (76.2 mm); 4 in (101.6 mm); 4.25 in (108.0 mm); 5.25 in (133.4 mm); 6 in (152.4 mm); 8 in (203.2 mm); 10 in (254.0 mm)
- Cartridge: .22 Long Rifle; .32 S&W Long; 9×19mm Parabellum; .38 Special; .357 Magnum
- Action: Double-action/single-action
- Effective firing range: 50–100 metres (55–109 yd)
- Feed system: 6-round cylinder
- Sights: Iron sights, both fixed and adjustable

The Manurhin MR 73 is a French double-action/single-action revolver chambered in .357 Magnum and .38 Special manufactured by Manurhin and is available in 2.5", 2.75", 3", 4", 4.25”, 5.25", 5.75", 6", 8" and 10" barrel lengths.

== History ==
In the 1960s, French law enforcement were confronted with armed robberies and terrorist activities by the OAS.

Introduced in 1972, the MR 73 was designed by Gilbert Maillard for police tactical unit use and is known for having formerly been the standard issue sidearm of the French National Gendarmerie, as well as for its offensive role and use by French police tactical units such as GIGN and the National Police's RAID. MR 73s were exported to French-speaking African states with Gendarmerie models being used by elite units.

They were first used when the GIGN were deployed to Air France flight 8969 in 1994 where GIA hijackers were killed by GIGN operators using the MR 73.

In 2021, Beretta imported the MR 73 Gendarmerie and the MR 73 Sport to the United States.

== Design details ==
Though the MR 73 was primarily intended as a service weapon and thus for continuous carry, every MR 73 is match grade accurate, shipped with its own factory test target fired at 25 m (27.3 yd). Averaging 15 rounds, no group over 20 mm (0.79 in) diameter with selected ammunition is allowed.

The frame, cylinder and barrel of the MR 73 are made from ordnance-certified steel. This high yield strength steel is hard to machine, but ensures the mechanical strength for reliable intensive use, combined with the considerable bolt thrust exerted by C.I.P.-conformant .357 Magnum ammunition, such as the 158 gr (10.2 g) Norma ammunition used by GIGN operators. RAID operators mainly used hollow point ammunition manufactured by Lapua. The standard issue police .357 Magnum round was loaded with 161 gr (10.4 g) soft point bullets and manufactured by the SFM (Société française de munitions, based in Issy-les-Moulineaux, France).

The MR 73 requires more than 12 hours of hand-fitting at the factory, making it about 50% more expensive than competing U.S.-manufactured brands.

=== Trigger ===
The MR 73 has an adjustable trigger weight in both double- and single-action modes, a feature found in other high-end revolvers such as those built by Korth and Janz. These adjustments do not alter the strength of the main spring, ensuring reliable primer ignition. This is achieved by use of a separate flat spring controlling the trigger.

This second spring operates on a roller to decrease friction, moves the trigger forward after firing, and moves up the safety block to prevent the hammer's nose from inadvertently setting off a round. The spring, sliders and roller in the trigger mechanism require extensive skilled hand fitting and polishing of components during assembly to obtain the desired mechanical interaction. The end result is a very smooth and consistent trigger.

Though the patents expired decades ago, no other revolver manufacturer tried to apply the MR 73 trigger mechanism.

==== Barrel ====
Barrels are manufactured by cold-hammering. The 400 mm (1 in 15.75) twist rate rifling is formed during the forging process, eliminating the need to cut rifling as a separate manufacturing step. This creates an extremely hard and microscopically smooth internal barrel surface.

==== .357 Magnum/.38 Special cylinder ====
The cylinder chambers are finished with an impact process that makes them glass-smooth and extremely hard. The factory proof-fires each cylinder chamber with .357 Magnum ammunition which generates 30% more pressure than the C.I.P. maximum allowable pressure for the Magnum cartridge. The factory guarantees that the cylinder will not burst or show any bulging or deformation with .357 Magnum ammunition developing double the C.I.P. 300.00 MPa (43,511 psi) P_{max} piezo pressure, ensuring that the cylinder can withstand 600.00 MPa (87,023 psi), or 43.5 tons per square inch).

=== Optional 9×19mm Parabellum cylinder ===
An innovative rare feature of MR 73 revolvers is a user-exchangeable cylinder which enables firing 9×19mm Parabellum ammunition.

The 9×19mm Parabellum cylinder uses the Pilorget system that employed an ejector bordered by elastic piano wire that engaged its extractor groove. 9×19mm Parabellum rounds were classified under French law as ammunition of war from the early 1980s, so that 9×19mm Parabellum cylinder became unavailable in France.

HKS manufactures a speedloader (Model 10A) to use with the .38, .357, and 9mm caliber cylinders.

== Variants ==
=== MR 73 family ===
The production of police/defense fixed-sight MR 73 variants with 2½", 3", and 4" inch barrels, chambered in 9×19mm Parabellum and .357 Magnum, started in 1973.

==== Match variants ====
In 1974 Manurhin rolled out its Match and Sport versions, with 4", 5¼", 6", and 8" barrels, all chambered in .357 Magnum caliber.

In 1977, it added 3", 5¼", and 8" GIGN versions chambered in .357 Magnum.

The Match sporting revolvers have only a single-action trigger, and have an extended rearward rise which allows the aiming length to be increased without increasing total length, which is restricted to a specified maximum in some competitions.

==== MR variants ====
In 1980 and 1981, the MR 32 sporting revolver chambered in .32 S&W Long and the MR 38 Match sporting revolver chambered in .38 Special were introduced, along with the 9" MR 73 Long Range. The center-fire MR range was completed in 1983 with the 10¾" MR 73 Silhouette chambered in .357 Magnum, and the limited-production stainless steel MR 73 10-year commemorative model.

The rimfire MR 22 sporting revolver chambered in .22 Long Rifle and the center-fire small-frame 5-shot Remora chambered in .38 Special followed in 1986.

The MR range culminated in 1987 with the Convertible model, fitted with interchangeable, tension-fitted barrels fed by hand-detachable cylinders chambered in .38 Special, .32 S&W Long, and .22 Long Rifle, with the aid of a frame-mounted firing pin selectable for center-fire or rimfire ignition.

==== MR 73 Gendarmerie ====
A variant called the MR 73 Gendarmerie has adjustable rear sights and larger ramp front sights rather than match-style Patridge sights.

==== Later productions ====
In 1998, Chapuis Armes purchased Manurhin, and began manufacturing new revolvers at the new Manufacture d. Armes de tir Chapuis facility located in Saint Bonnet Le Chateau, France, using the original Manurhin Equipment 1972–1998, located in Mulhouse, France.

=== MR 73 replacement family ===
The Manurhin MR 73 replacement family of revolvers includes the Special Police F1/X1, MR 88 (based on the Ruger Security-Six), MR 93 and MR 96.

These revolvers generally were attempts to reduce the complex, costly production process of the MR 73 family.

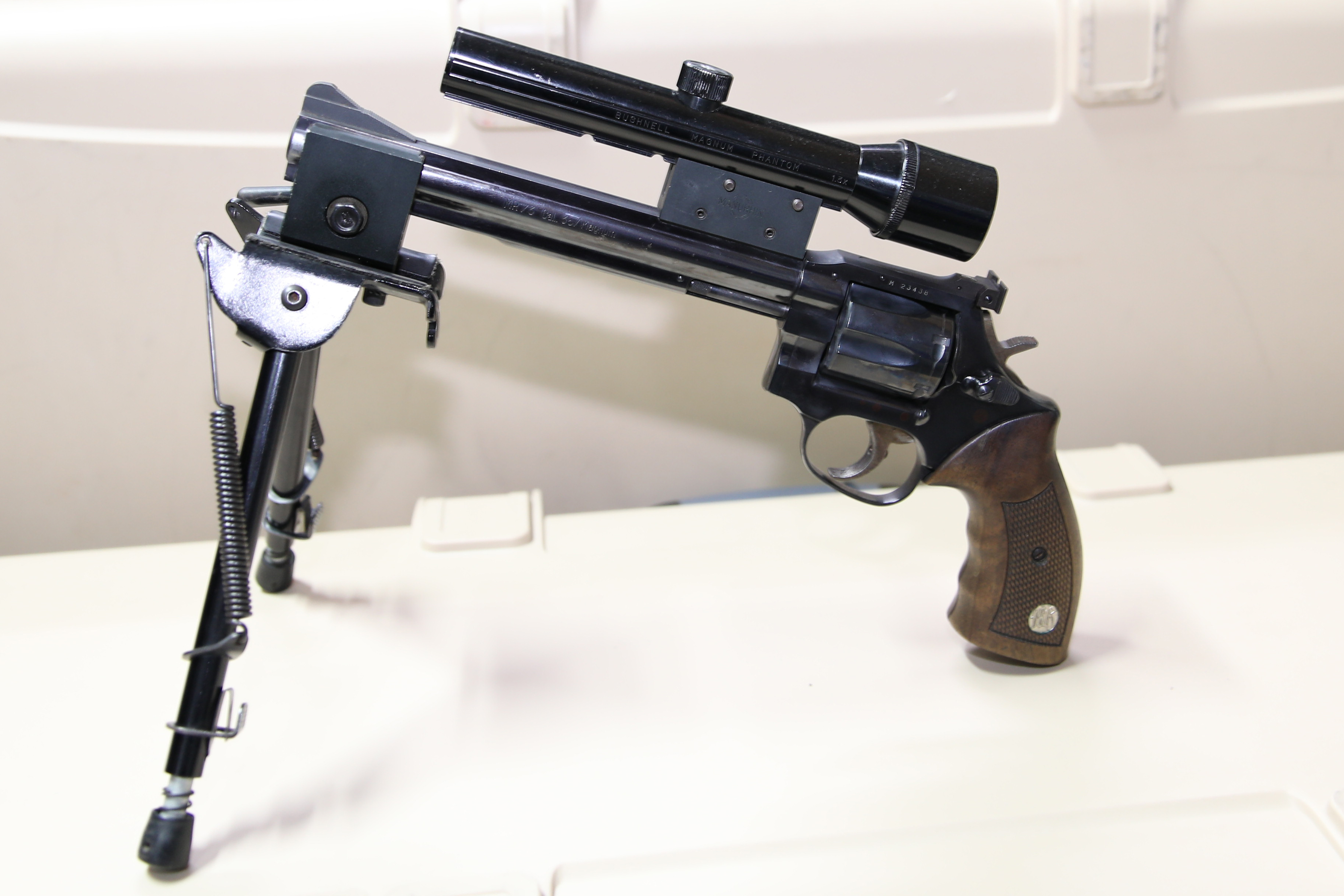
MR 73 GIGN "sniper" variant with a mounted scope, bipod, and 8" barrel

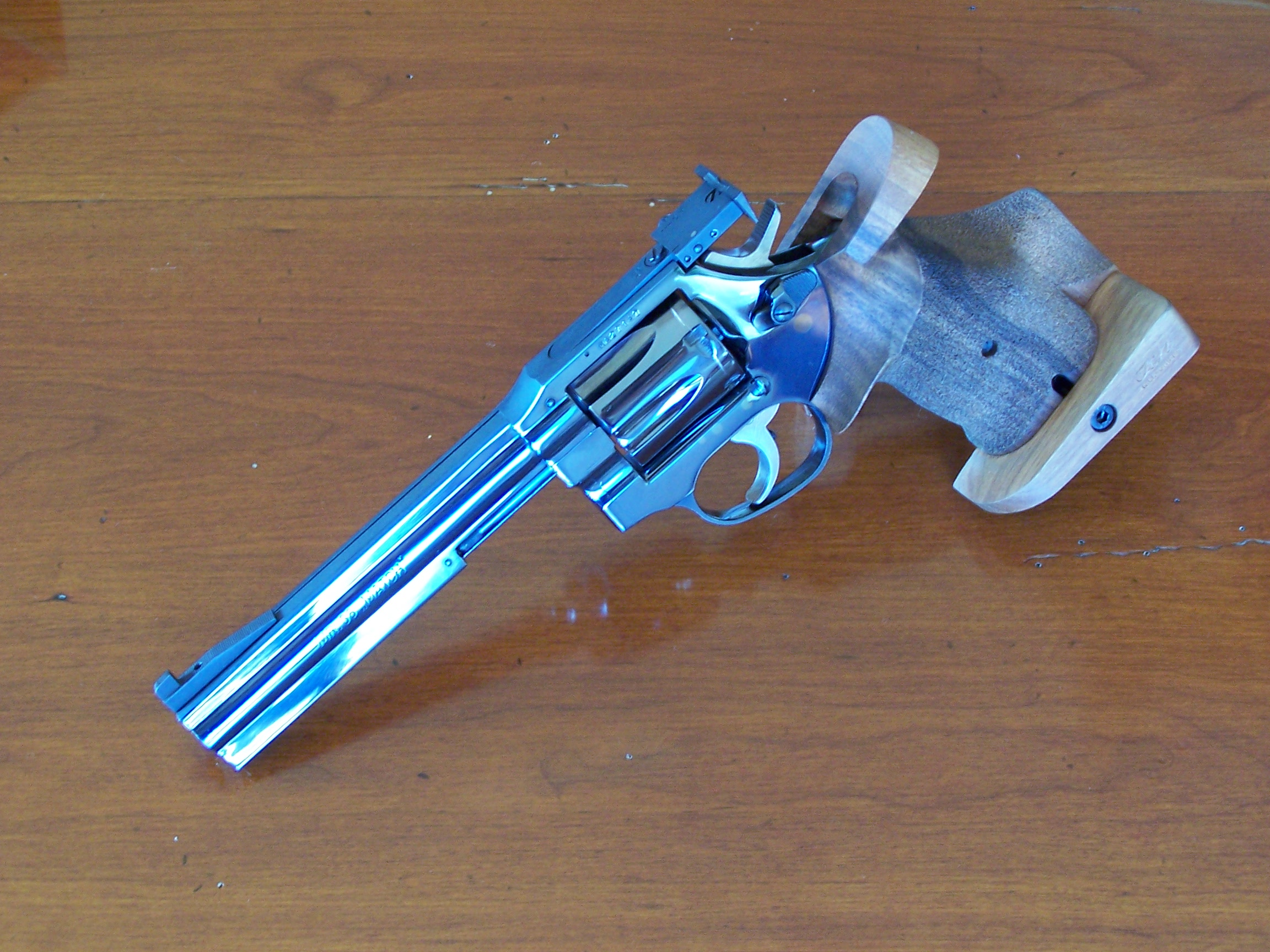
MR 38 Match sporting variant chambered in .38 Special with ergonomic grip and 5¾" barrel

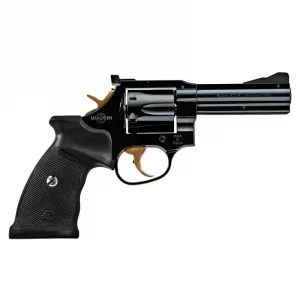
MR 73 Gendarmerie with Trautsch polymer/rubber grip

== Users ==
=== Current ===
- Argentina
- Benin
- Bolivia
- Bosnia and Herzegovina
- Botswana
- Burkina Faso
- Cambodia
- Cameroon
- Cape Verde
- Chad
- Comoros
- Congo-Brazzaville
- Cyprus
- Democratic Republic of Congo
- Djibouti
- Egypt
- El Salvador
- Eritrea
- France: GIGN, RAID and GSPR.
- Gabon
- Georgia
- Ghana
- Grenada
- Ivory Coast
- Madagascar
- Malaysia: RELA Corps
- Mali: People's Movement for the Liberation of Azawad
- Malta
- Mauritania
- Mauritius
- Morocco
- Mozambique
- Namibia
- Nepal
- Nigeria
- Niger
- Oman
- Papua New Guinea
- Senegal
- Sierra Leone
- Seychelles
- Somalia
- South Sudan
- Sri Lanka
- Sudan
- Suriname
- Switzerland
- Syria
- Tanzania
- Thailand
- Togo
- Tunisia
- Uganda
- Zambia
- Zimbabwe

=== Former ===
- Austria: Previously used by the EKO Cobra

== Literature ==
- Revolver Manurhin MR 73 // «Střelecká revue», 11, 1974
