= Chapuis Armes =

French gun-maker

Chapuis Armes is a French gun-maker based in St-Bonnet-le-Château specializing in premium hunting shotguns and rifles, as well as the Manurhin-brand revolver. In March 2019, Chapuis Armes was acquired by Beretta Holding. Chapuis has been a family-owned gunmaking business since the early years of the 20th century. They specialize in side by side and over under hunting shotguns, mostly for upland game, and in big game rifles (over under and side by side double rifles, as well as break-open single shots and straight-pull bolt actions).

In the US, Chapuis is imported and marketed exclusively by Benelli USA since January 1st, 2021. The main USA Chapuis models available are:

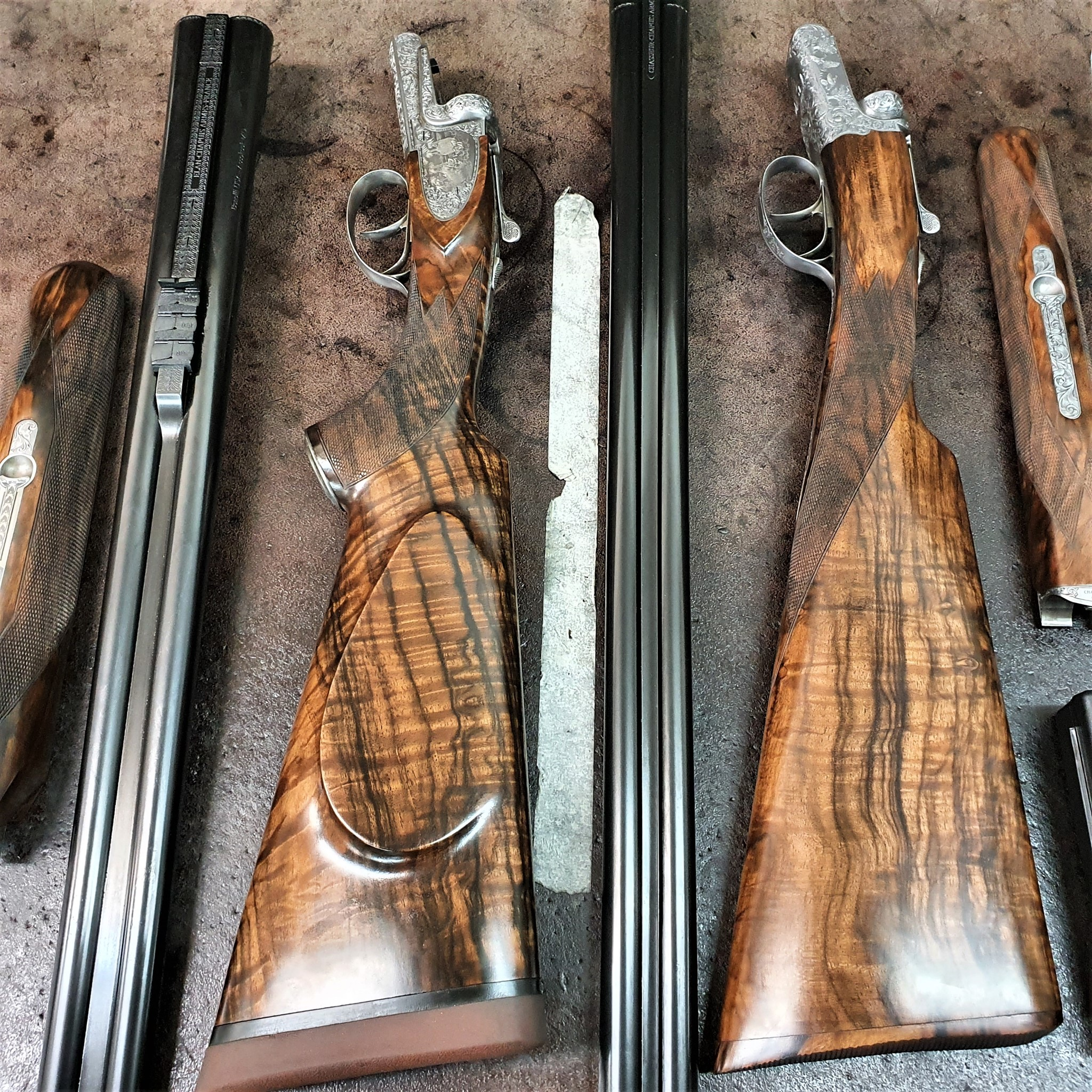
- A Chapuis double rifle and side by side upland shotgun
  Chasseur side by side shotgun ("Progress" in Europe): a 28" barreled upland shotgun with straight grip, double triggers, ejectors, and interchangeable choke tubes (available in 12, 20, or 28ga).
- Faisan over under shotgun ("Super Orion" in Europe): a 28" barreled upland shotgun with pistol grip, single trigger, ejectors, and interchangeable choke tubes (available in 12, 20, or 28ga).
- Elan double rifle ("Brousse" and "Jungle" in Europe): a 24" or 25" barreled double express rifle with double trigger, ejectors and manual safety (available in .375 H&H Flanged, .450-400 NE, .470 NE).
- ROLS straight-pull bolt-action rifle: an interchangeable barrel rifle system featuring a very unusual locking system with seven locking "lugs" of complicated geometry swinging inside a barrel extension around a non-rotating bolt and a rotary magazine that comes in different calibers and finishes.

Most of the Chapuis offering is available in a "Classic" finish (3A wood, laser engraving) or "Artisan" (5A wood, hand engraving).

The Manurhin revolver is imported into the US by Beretta USA.
