= Neuilly kindergarten hostage crisis =

1993 hostage crisis in France

- Neuilly-sur-Seine (Île-de-France (region)) Neuilly-sur-Seine (France)
- Native name: Prise d'otages de la maternelle de Neuilly
- Location: 48.8772°N 2.2536°E; Neuilly-sur-Seine, Île-de-France, France
- Date: 13–15 May 1993
- Attack type: Hostage taking
- Weapons: Flare gun; 21 sticks of dynamite
- Deaths: 1 (the perpetrator)
- Injuries: 0
- Perpetrator: Érick Schmitt

The Neuilly kindergarten hostage crisis took place from 13–15 May 1993, when Érick Schmitt (calling himself the "Human Bomb"), a depressed and unemployed businessman, held a kindergarten class in Neuilly-sur-Seine, France, hostage for two days. He was armed with a flare gun and strapped with explosives, and was eventually killed on 15 May during a RAID assault. There were no other casualties. The police response to the crisis was controversial due to the circumstances under which Schmitt was killed and the involvement of future French president Nicolas Sarkozy.

== Events ==
=== 13 May ===
On Thursday, 13 May 1993 at 9:27 a.m., Érick Schmitt, dressed in black and wearing a motorcycle helmet and balaclava burst into kindergarten number 8 of the Commandant Charcot school complex on Rue de la Ferme in Neuilly-sur-Seine, where 21 children aged three to four were working with their teacher to make necklaces for Mother's Day. Armed with a flare gun and explosives, he took the children and their teacher, Laurence Dreyfus, hostage. In order to not be identified, the man did not speak at the start of the hostage-taking and communicated by fax.

Aimé Touitou, director of the Hauts-de-Seine police force, began to negotiate with the hostage-taker, who gave the teacher a letter addressed to the Minister of the Interior, in which he demanded an 100 million franc ransom ($18 million) paid in gold and used banknotes and a large car in order to escape. He threatened to blow up the room if he didn't get the ransom, a threat made credible by his past demonstrations, as he had previously taken care to blow up several dustbins, deliberately leaving a signature on them. He also demanded to meet with a TF1 journalist. At the time, the man was known only as "Human Bomb" or "H.B.", a name he gave himself. Investigators tried to identify the hostage-taker, but were unable to do so until the hostage-taking was over. Schmitt was described as being "remarkably calm".

Numerous media outlets arrived as early as 10.30 a.m. to cover the event. Journalists camped outside the school, and the hostage-taking became a national event. RAID moved into position at 10:45. RAID chief Louis Bayon and his negotiator Michel Marie convinced two fathers to negotiate with Schmitt. By early afternoon, five children had been freed. At 3 p.m., Nicolas Sarkozy, then mayor of Neuilly-sur-Seine - as well as Budget Minister and government spokesman - intervened in the negotiations to persuade Schmitt to continue releasing children; it was later discovered that Sarkozy asked to be filmed in front of the TV cameras. He left the school with a child in his arms and handed him over to his mother. Sarkozy entered the classroom seven times to negotiate, managing to get four children out. In September 1993, this intervention earned him a place in the prestigious Sofres-Figaro magazine popularity barometer.

=== 14 May ===
During the negotiations, Schmitt gradually released 15 of the children, eventually keeping only six, despite the fact that he had specified in his first ransom demand that none of the children would be released until he had obtained the requested sum. He also threatened to execute the children (by slitting their throats) if the authorities failed to respond promptly, but this threat was not carried out. The authorities decided to call in a doctor for health and psychological reasons, but especially for the sake of inspecting the layout of the room. Before finding a military doctor, it was decided to bring in an emergency doctor from SAMU: Catherine Ferracci.

Schmitt, eager for media coverage, had a radio and television set installed. Through Sarkozy, he had a TF1 journalist, Jean-Pierre About, summoned. With the help of a periscope, the police identified Schmitt's ignition device: several explosive charges placed close to the door, several explosive charges placed near the doors and an explosive belt he was wearing. Dreyfus told the children Schmitt was "hunting wolves". Schmitt stated he had no intent to hurt any of the children, but "would rather die than be taken alive", and threatened to use the children as shields to escape. The hostage specialists became worried as Schmitt appeared to lose interest in the money and discuss suicide.

=== 15 May ===
After nearly two days of the hostage situation Schmitt began to show signs of fatigue. RAID decided to take action when he fell asleep. The plan was for the RAID men to enter the room while he was asleep. Two men would hold him at gunpoint, ready to neutralize him if he woke up, while the others would evacuate the hostages from the room. To ensure that Schmitt would be asleep when the assault took place, the RAID men planned to pour a sleeping pill (Gamma OH with hypnovel, the effectiveness of which was tested on one of their own) into the coffee regularly brought to Schmitt. As a precaution, Évelyne Lambert (then a doctor and captain in the Paris Fire Brigade), who had stayed with the teacher to look after the children, was kept in the dark. She was to make sure that Schmitt was asleep, and give a signal to let the police know that they could intervene.

On the morning of Saturday 15 May, Schmitt dozed off. Évelyne Lambert checked that he was asleep, shaking him and getting the children to move the furniture noisily. She then gave the agreed signal. At 7.25 a.m., ten RAID officers entered the classroom. Eight of them went to the girls, covering them with mattresses and dragging them towards the exit. Two others, André Duquesnoy and Daniel Boulanger, charged at Schmitt brandishing their silenced weapons. Schmitt was shot three times in the head from a distance of one meter by policeman Daniel Boulanger, with officials claiming that he woke up with a start and gestured to his detonator.

Charles Pasqua, present behind the scenes throughout the event, proclaimed his satisfaction at an impromptu press conference: "It was very important that the children were freed in good health. That was our first priority. Second being that the law remained in force, which wasn't to be ignored. The madman is dead". (Note: French: "Il était très important que les enfants soient libérés en bonne santé. C'était notre objectif essentiel. Le second, qui n'était pas négligeable, était que force reste à la loi. Le forcené est mort.") The identity card of the perpetrator was found in his clothes. A few hours before his death, Schmitt told Dreyfus what "H.B." stood for: Human Bomb. The controversy surrounding the death of Schmitt, whose family insisted he was killed in his sleep, erupted a few days later.

== Perpetrator ==
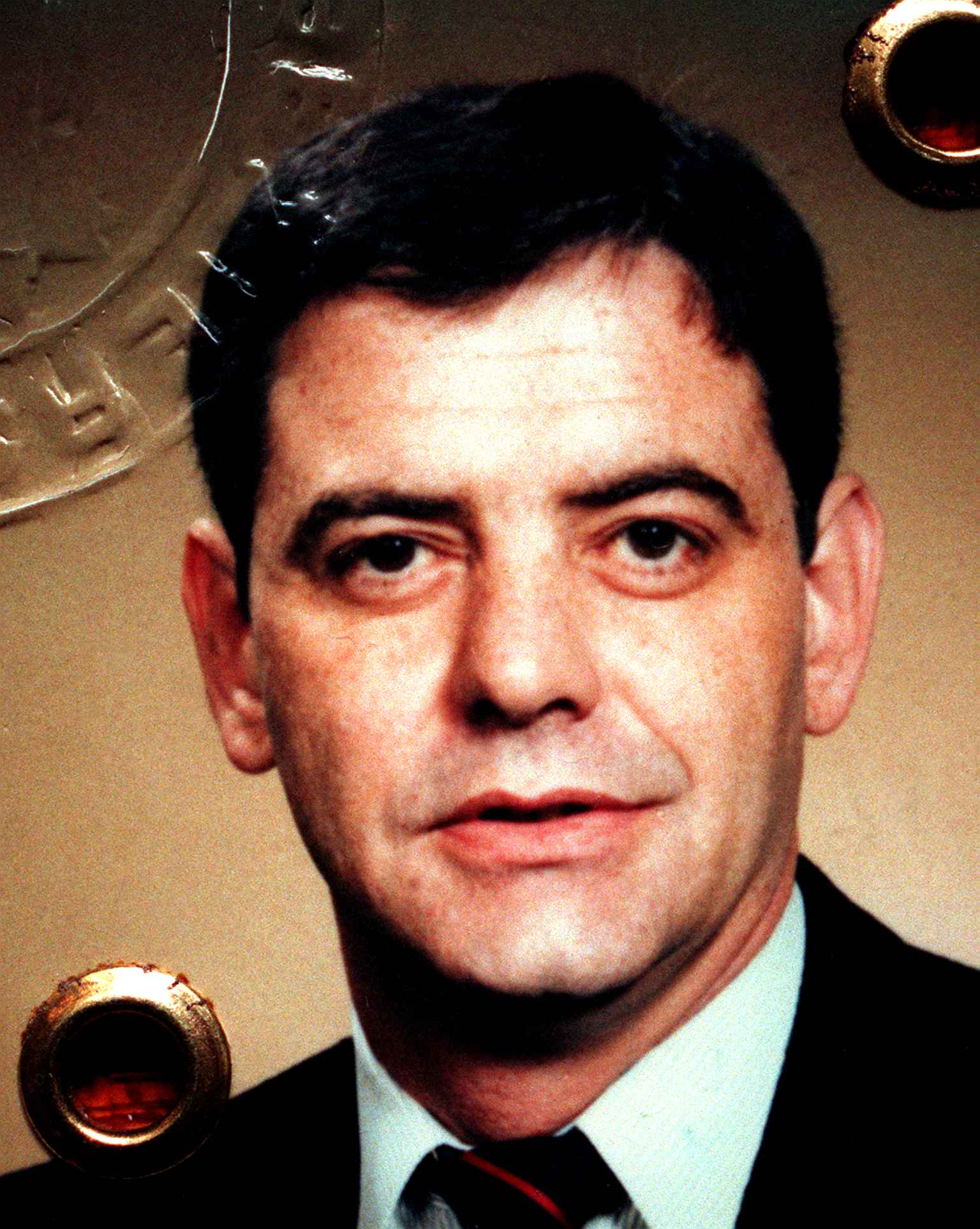
Schmitt's ID photo, dated 1990

Érick Schmitt was born on 31 July 1951 in Burdeau, French Algeria, where his father was a non-commissioned officer in the army. After the exodus of French settlers from Algeria following the Algerian War, he arrived in Cers near Béziers with his family in 1963. At the age of 16, he joined the French Army, where he learned to handle weapons and explosives. After becoming a chief sergeant, he left the army in 1974 at age 23 before moving to Paris. That same year, he divorced his wife.

He was then employed by IBM as a maintenance inspector in the Paris region. His neighbors noted him to be isolated. He founded a small computer company based in Rosny-sous-Bois named France Système Maintenance Hardware SARL. In 1987, a conflict broke out between Schmitt and his associates who wanted to take control of the company, losing part of the company's clientele with its revenue collapsing. A few months later, the company was under judicial liquidation, with 10 million francs in liabilities. The failure of his company led him into a spiral of depression. Unable to pay the bills for his apartments, he was forced to sell it.

Schmitt later worked as an external consultant at Thomson, then at an engineering school, the Institut de Maintenance des Pays de la Loire, but was laid off after a year. A second company he founded also went bankrupt, leading to Schmitt being banned for a period of five years from managing or controlling a business enterprise. Schmitt was registered as unemployed with the Agence nationale pour l'emploi in Béziers for a year.

A few days before the hostage-taking, Schmitt asked his sister to photograph him. On 3 May, he wrote on his computer the letters he would give to the police, saying that "to avoid the fate reserved for a child hostage taker, I will not allow myself to be taken alive, and I am determined to blow up everything if I fail". He then cleaned his room and wiped his hard drive.

On 7 May, Schmitt wrote to the press to announce an attack in a Neuilly parking lot. The next day, an underground parking lot was bombed in Neuilly, causing only material damage. He left a leaflet signed "H.B." calling for the resignation of the Head of State and the Minister of the Interior. RAID negotiator Michel Marie saw the hostage taking as the desperate act of a man at his wits' end, wanting fame and a way to accomplish suicide by proxy. A childhood friend of Schmitt later stated to Midi Libre that he could not believe he had done it, and that he believed Schmitt simply wanted to kill himself and could not find the courage to do it.

=== Controversy over Schmitt's death ===
According to the testimonies of the two police officers charged with neutralizing Schmitt if he woke up during the intervention, a child, frightened by the arrival of the hooded RAID men, screamed, which woke up Schmitt, who then gestured towards his detonator (the investigation would show that the bomb, consisting of 21 sticks of dynamite spread around the classroom and wrapped around his stomach in Chatterton, was not primed at this detonator (Note: The power source for the detonator was not in place.)). Police officer Daniel Boulanger fired the first shot, which was enough to neutralize Schmitt, and, to be on the safe side, two other "double tap" bullets, using a technique peculiar to intervention services.

For an article published in June 1993 in "Justice", the magazine of the left-leaning Syndicat de la magistrature, six magistrates (Note: Béatrice Patrie, director of the journal, as well as Marie-Anne Baulon, Anne Crenier, Jean-Claude Bouvier, Alain Vogelweith and Denis Chausserie-Laprée.) were convicted of defaming Charles Pasqua. In the 1993 book La Mort hors la loi d’Érick Schmitt, authors Alain Vogelweith and Béatrice Patrie, two members of the Syndicat de la magistrature, defended the theory of a premeditated, politically-motivated killing, claiming that Pasqua gave the order to shoot Schmitt. Pasqua sued for defamation and the book was withdrawn from the market. In July 1993, Schmitt's family filed a complaint against an unnamed plaintiff for premeditated homicide. Schmitt was asleep when the police entered the room, a fact verified by Évelyne Lambert beforehand. In her deposition, she stated that she had made "a terrible racket" by moving furniture, and that she had shaken Schmitt hard, telling him to wake up. The essence of the execution theory lies in the fact that there are no witnesses other than the two RAID officers watching Schmitt during the intervention, who saw him wake up. At the end of the investigation, the examining magistrate dismissed the case, ruling that the police officers had acted in self-defense.

== Aftermath ==
Laurence Dreyfus, the teacher, was dubbed by the media "l'institutrice-courage" (lit. 'the courageous teacher'). Born on 28 April 1963 in Maine-et-Loire, she became a teacher at the Commandant-Charcot kindergarten in Neuilly (92) in September 1992. Shortly after the hostage-taking, she and Évelyne Lambert were awarded the Legion of Honour by François Mitterrand. Édouard Balladur, then Prime Minister, invited her to the Hôtel Matignon. She subsequently left the French Ministry of Education to become a psychologist.

In 1997, she published Chronique d'une prise d'otages, co-written with Béatrice Casanova (Flammarion), which recounts the hostage-taking of which she was a victim, and the torment this tragedy caused her in particular. The media learned afterwards that she cracked under the pressure and left the classroom after thirty-eight hours. According to the investigators, she was a victim of Stockholm syndrome.

Schmitt's sister later died by suicide, not having recovered from the event.

=== Nicolas Sarkozy's role ===
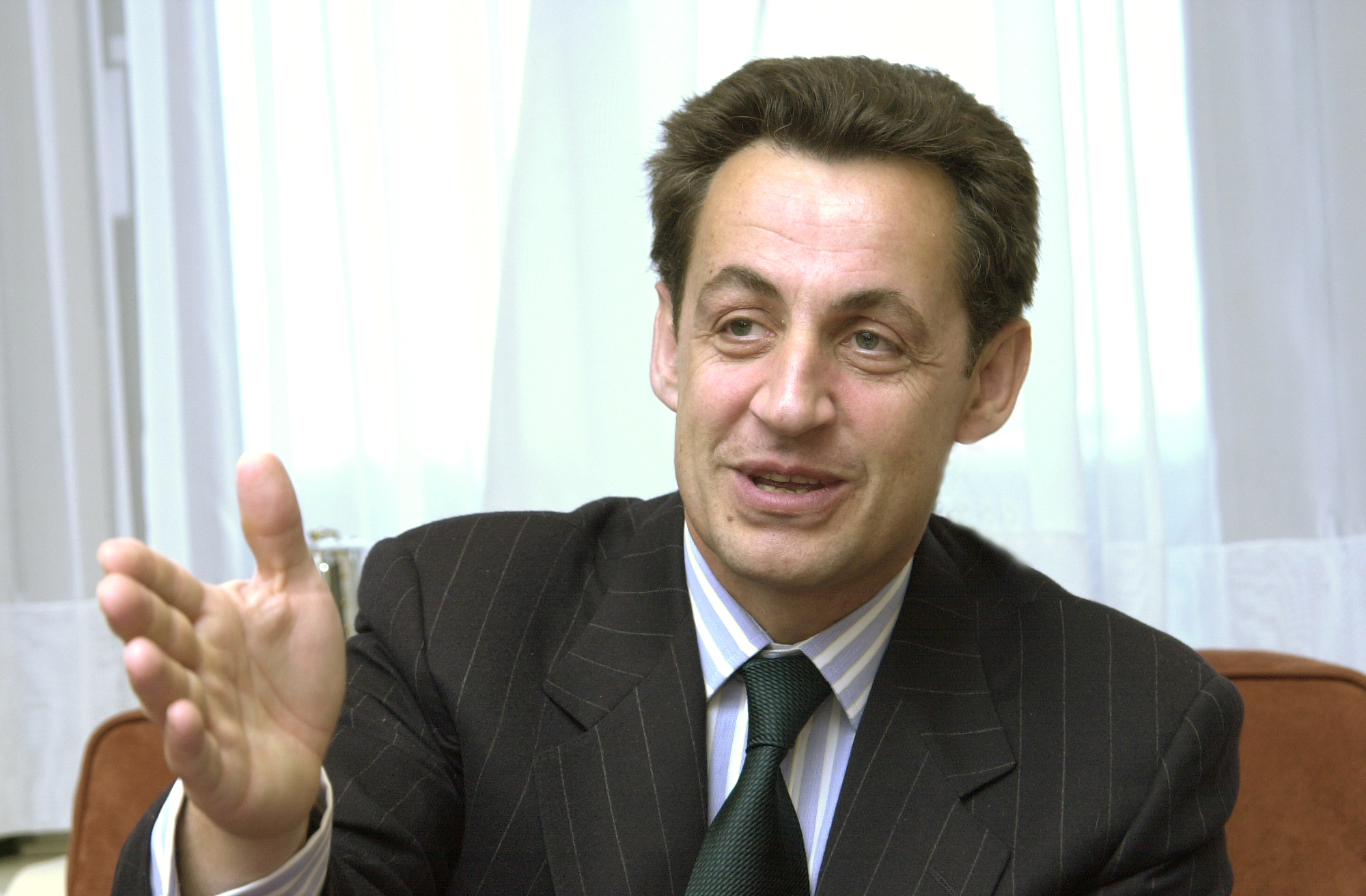
2003 photo of Sarkozy.

Nicolas Sarkozy, mayor of Neuilly, Minister of the Budget and government spokesman, was awarded the RAID medal following the hostage-taking. Sarkozy received national attention for his role in the hostage negotiations. His role in the negotiations with the hostage-taker became controversial, however, when he became a leading political figure and later the President of France. Interviewed on the French TV program Faites entrer l'accusé in July 2004, journalist Jean-Pierre About, former Nanterre public prosecutor Pierre Lyon-Caen and former Hauts-de-Seine national police director Aimé Touitou claimed that Nicolas Sarkozy imposed himself on the crisis unit and journalists.

In a Lundi Investigation program on 6 June 2005, Pierre Lyon-Caen looked back at the affair, referring to Sarkozy: "He had the reflex, which shows the political animal, to bring in the only PR man with him, a member of the spokesmans office at the Paris Fire Brigade, who had a camera." (Note: French: "Il a le réflexe, qui montre l'animal politique, de faire venir le seul homme de communication, le pompier chargé de la communication, qui avait une caméra.") According to the program, Sarkozy's attitude led Schmitt to break off negotiations.

=== Media ===
In 2005, writer and playwright Emmanuel Darley drew inspiration from this event for a play entitled Être humain. In 2003, Philippe Djian drew inspiration from the hostage crisis for a short story about a couple, Mise en bouche.
