= RAID (French police unit) =

Elite tactical unit of the French National Police

Research, Assistance, Intervention, Deterrence
- Recherche, Assistance, Intervention, Dissuasion (French)
- Logo of RAID
- Active: 1985 – present
- Country: France
- Agency: National Police
- Type: Police tactical unit
- Role: Law enforcement Counter-terrorism; Hostage rescue Close protection
- Headquarters: Bièvres, Essonne
- Motto: "Servir sans faillir" "To serve without failing"
- Abbreviation: RAID

Structure
- Operators: Approx. 450

Commanders
- Current commander: Guillaume Cardy
- Notable commanders: Ange Mancini; Jean-Michel Fauvergue

Notables
- Significant operation(s): Neuilly-sur-Seine hostage crisis; Anti-Action Directe arrests; Anti-GIA operations; 2005 Paris Riots; 2012 Midi-Pyrénées shootings; 2015 Charlie Hebdo shooting; Hypercacher kosher supermarket siege; November 2015 Paris attacks; Nahel Merzouk protests

Recherche, Assistance, Intervention, Dissuasion ("Research, Assistance, Intervention, Deterrence"), commonly abbreviated RAID (/reɪd/; French: [ʁɛd]), is an elite tactical unit of the French National Police. Founded in 1985, it is headquartered in Bièvres, Essonne, approximately 20 kilometres (12 miles) southwest of Paris. RAID is the National Police counterpart of the National Gendarmerie's GIGN. Both units share responsibility for the French territory. (Note: Each of the two French national police forces, the National Police and the National Gendarmerie has primary responsibility for a part of the territory: large cities and urban areas for the National Police, smaller cities and rural areas for the National Gendarmerie.)

Since 2009, RAID and the Paris Search and Intervention Brigade (BRI), a separate National Police unit reporting directly into the Paris Police Prefecture (French: Préfecture de police de Paris), (Note: The Paris Préfecture de Police (commonly abbreviated PP) is an organization tailor-made to handle the specific requirements of Paris (a large city and the country's capital). It reports directly to the Ministry of the Interior and controls several non-police departments such as the Paris Fire brigade.) have formed a task force called National Police Intervention Force (French: Force d'intervention de la Police nationale) or FIPN. When activated, the task force is headed by the RAID commander. Thirteen regional units of the National Police, previously known as National Police Intervention Groups (GIPNs), have been created or permanently integrated into RAID and re-designated as "RAID branches" (French: antennes RAID) between 2015 and 2019.

== Missions ==
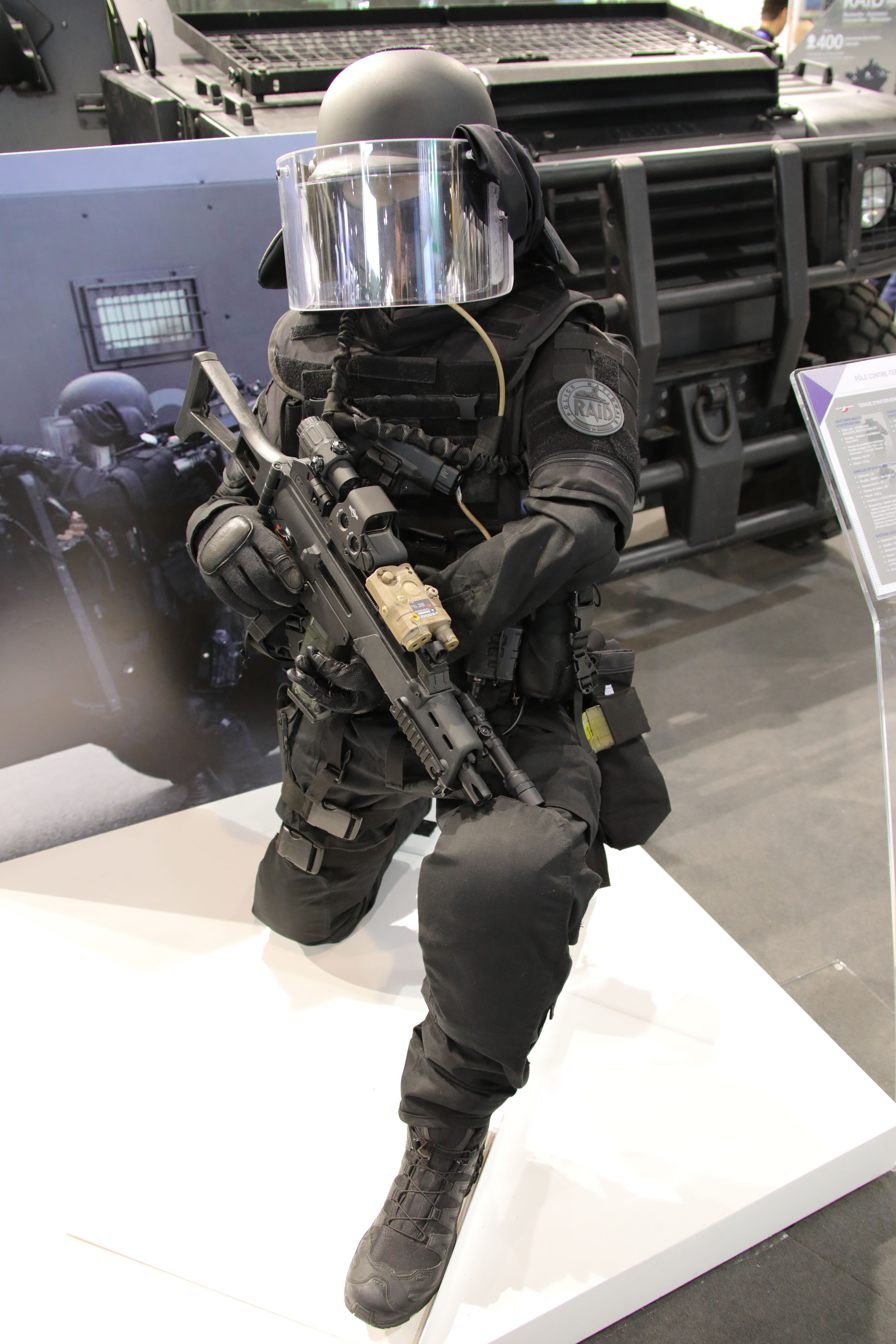
Typical equipment of a RAID police officer, June 2018

Among the main missions of RAID are:

- Counter-terrorism in coordination with UCLAT, the co-ordination unit for the fight against terrorism (French: Unité de coordination de la lutte anti-terroriste).
- Hostage recovery situations
- Close protection of VIPs
- Protection of some of the French embassies in war-torn countries (a mission shared with the Gendarmerie's GIGN)
- Site protection during special events
- Resolution of prison riots
- Assistance to other police departments fighting against organized crime
- Surveillance and arrest of high-profile criminals
- Arrest of dangerous deranged persons
- Training and assistance to foreign police forces
- Assessment of new equipment and techniques.

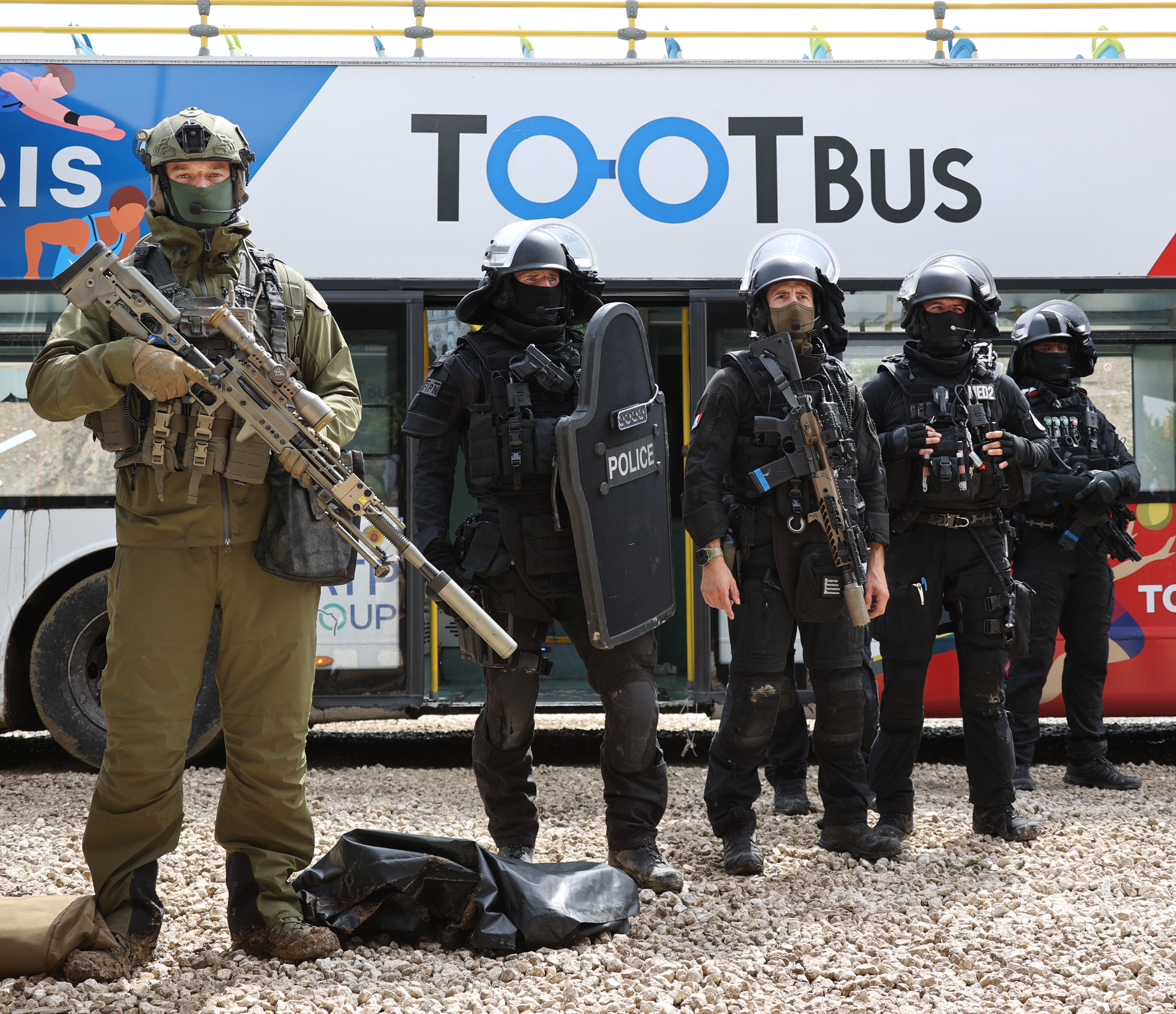
French RAID Police tactical unit operators - 2024

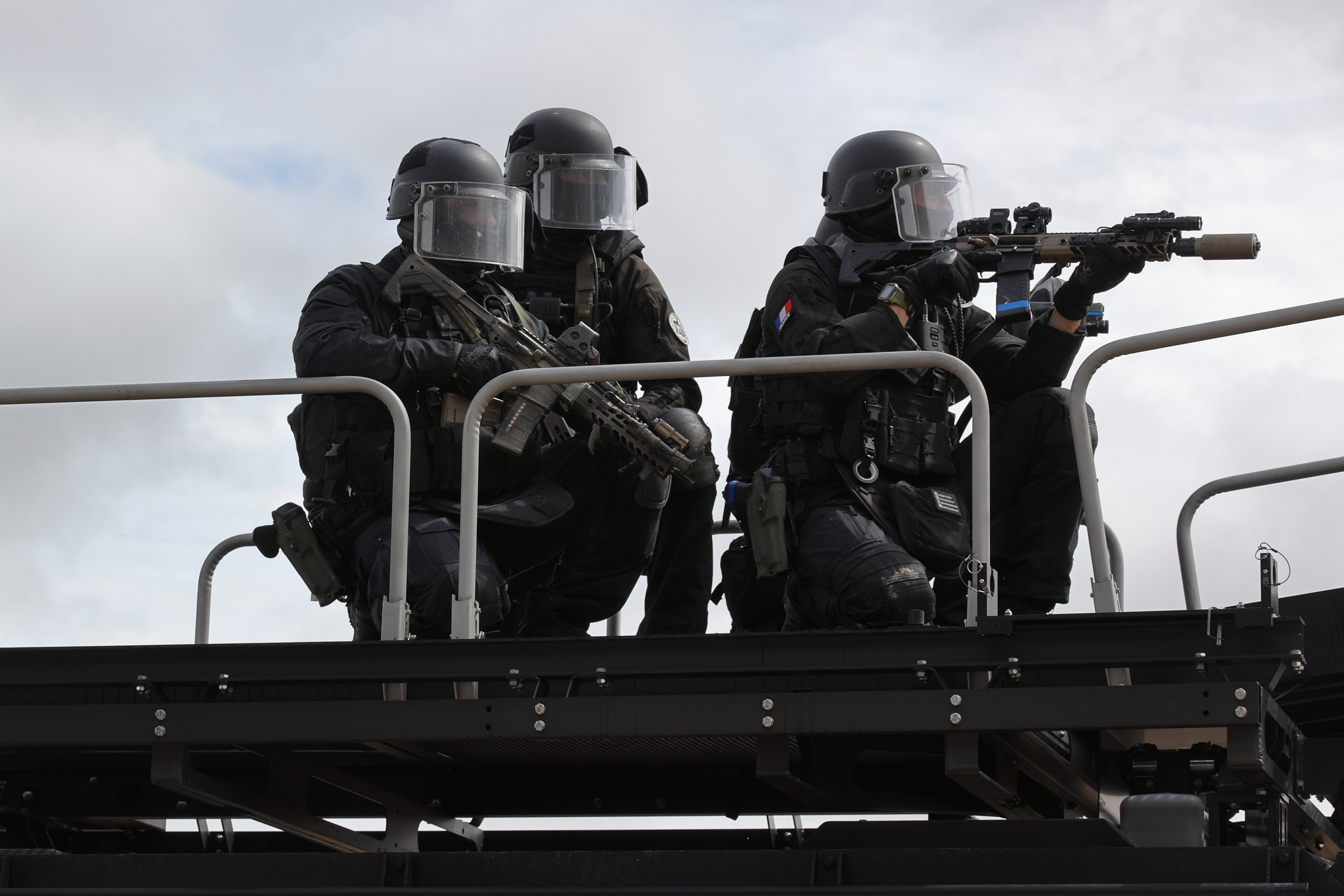
Operators of the French Police RAID tactical unit during a demo - 2024

Before the creation of RAID, the National Police did not have a national unit comparable to the Gendarmerie's GIGN and relied instead on regional units: BRI in Paris and the GIPNs in the provinces. Minister of the Interior Pierre Joxe was the key decision maker who authorized the creation of the unit. (Note: Later, as defence minister, he was instrumental in creating the French Special operations command (French: Commandement des opérations spéciales or COS) after the Gulf War.) RAID was founded by then-commissaires Robert Broussard and Ange Mancini in 1985. Broussard, one of the best known Police commissaires at the time, was one of the advisers who pushed the project. Mancini was chosen to be the unit's first commander. RAID's first mission - a hostage situation in a Nantes tribunal, took place soon afterwards in December 1985.

In 1987 RAID arrested the leaders of the terrorist group Action Directe in their Vitry-aux-Loges hideout. In May 1993, RAID solved a delicate hostage situation when a man named Erick Schmitt, calling himself "HB" (for "Human Bomb", in English), and carrying large quantities of explosives, took 21 hostages in a Neuilly-sur-Seine nursery school. The hostage taker was finally shot and the children were recovered safely, together with their teacher and a nurse. In 1996, in Roubaix, the unit neutralized the Gang de Roubaix, a 14-member terrorist group tied to the Armed Islamic Group of Algeria (GIA), suspected of several bank robberies, murders, and a failed attack against the Group of Seven (G7) meeting in Lille. The assault was very violent and resulted in the death of four terrorists. Two RAID operatives were also injured, one by a grenade blast, the other hit by a bullet in a lung. Christophe Caze, the head of the group, escaped the burning building, but was killed at a Belgian checkpoint during a gunfight with Customs agents. Several days later, thanks to an electronic device found on Caze's body, Fateh Kamel, head of a terrorist cell in Montreal, was arrested in Jordan and tried in France.

RAID operators saw action during the 2005 and 2006 riots in France, as well as in a hostage situation in Versailles, where an armed man was shot dead by RAID operators after coming under attack. On 21 and 22 March 2012, RAID was tasked to arrest Mohammed Merah, the main suspect for shooting sprees in Toulouse and Montauban. RAID surrounded the flat where Merah was entrenched. After 30 hours of siege, RAID stormed the flat to apprehend Merah who fought back. After a four-minute shoot out, Merah was shot by a RAID sniper while exiting the building.

On 9 January 2015 RAID, together with BRI, a unit of the Paris Metropolitan Police, ended the hostage situation at the kosher supermarket Hypercacher on the third day of the January 2015 Paris terrorist attacks. On 14 November 2015 RAID, again with the Paris BRI, took part in operations at the Bataclan theatre, where 90 people were killed during a series of bombings, shootings and hostage taking in Paris on 13 – 14 November. On 18 November RAID undertook a follow-up operation in Saint-Denis seeking Abdelhamid Abaaoud, the 'mastermind' of the attacks, who was killed.

RAID also provides close protection for foreign dignitaries traveling in France. During special events, RAID is also in charge of protecting French individuals abroad (For example, the French Delegation during the Olympic Games is under RAID protection during the whole event).

Three RAID officers have been killed in action: two in Ris-Orangis (near Paris) in 1989 and one in Corsica in 1996.

== Equipment ==
=== Pistols ===
- Manurhin MR 73
- Glock 17, 18, 19, 26

=== Shotguns ===
- Molot Vepr
- KelTec KSG

=== Assault rifles ===
- Heckler & Koch G36
- Heckler & Koch HK416

=== Sniper rifles ===
- Heckler & Koch HK417
- PGM Ultima Ratio

== RAID Commanders ==
- Ange Mancini: 1985-1990
- Louis Bayon: 1990-1996
- Gérard Zerbi: 1996-1999
- Jean-Gustave Paulmier: 1999-2002
- Christian Lambert: 2002-2004
- Jean-Louis Fiamenghi: 2004-2007
- Amaury de Hauteclocque: 2007-2013
- Jean-Michel Fauvergue: 2013-2017
- Jean-Baptiste Dulion: 2017-2023
- Guillaume Cardy: since 2023

== See also ==
- Groupe d'Intervention de la Gendarmerie Nationale (GIGN)

== Bibliography ==
The following books and articles are in French.

=== Books ===
- Tanguy, Jean-Marc (2015). Le RAID - 30 ans d'intervention [RAID - 30 years of intervention]. Paris: Editions Pierre de Taillac.
- Broussard, Robert (2012). Mémoires du commissaire Broussard [Commissaire Broussard remembers]. Paris: Nouveau Monde Editions.
- de Hauteclocque, Amaury (2009). Histoire(s) du Raid [RAID stories]. Jacob Duvernet Editions.
- Courtois, Jean-Louis (2000). Le RAID, l'ultime recours [RAID, the last resort]. Crépin-Leblond.
- Le RAID, Unité d'élite de la Police Nationale [The RAID, an elite unit of the National Police]. Crépin-Leblond. 2005. (DVD included)
- Courtois, Jean-Louis (1999). Le RAID, l'unité d'élite de la Police Française [RAID, an elite unit of the French police]. Pygmalion-Gérard Watelet.
- About, Jean-Pierre (2005). HB, 46 heures qui ont bouleversé la France [HB, 46 hours that shook France]. Editions Tarcher.
- Boulanger, Daniel (2007). Le jour où j'ai tué HB [The day I killed HB]. Hachette.

=== Magazines ===
- "Le RAID en action" [The RAID in action]. Special Edition RAIDS. No. 19. 2005.
- "RAID, 20 ans d'action" [RAID, 20 years of action]. Commando. No. 20. January–December 2005.
- "La sélection du RAID" [The selection process for RAID]. Police Pro. No. 8. March–April 2008.
- "Le RAID, 20 ans d'opérations" [RAID, 20 years of operations]. RAIDS. No. 233. October 2005.
- "RAID: refuser la fatalité" [RAID: reject the inevitability]. Police Frequency. No. 2. October 1987.
- "La police face à l'exception: flics de choc" [The police deal with the exception of shock cops]. Civic. No. 53. August–September 1995.
