= Co-ordination unit of the fight against terrorism =

The Co-ordination unit of the fight against terrorism (French: Unité de coordination de la lutte anti-terroriste, UCLAT) was a French organization consisting of representatives from all active branches of the National Police.

Founded in 1984, this structure ensured the coordination of all departments involved in the fight against terrorism. It performed a daily analysis and synthesis of information relating to terrorism by working closely with the General Directorate for Internal Security, the Directorate-General for External Security, the National Gendarmerie and the General Directorate of Customs and Indirect Taxes.

UCLAT coordinated the sharing of operational information from all relevant authorities and services involved in the fight against terrorism, including anti-terrorist judges and the prison administration.

UCLAT was directly attached to the Office of the Director General of Police.
