= Prefectures in France =

Governmental subdivision in France

Map of the prefectures in Metropolitan France with their INSEE number

In France, a prefecture (French: préfecture, pronounced [pʁefɛktyʁ]) may be:

- the chef-lieu de département, the commune in which the administration of a department is located;
- the chef-lieu de région, the commune in which the administration of a region is located;
- the jurisdiction of a prefecture;
- the official residence or headquarters of a prefect.

Although the administration of departments and regions is distinct, a regional prefect is ex officio prefect of the department in which the regional prefecture is located. The officeholder has authority upon the other prefects in the region on a range of matters.

== Role of the prefecture ==
There are 101 prefectures in France, one for each department. The official in charge is the prefect (French: préfet). The prefecture is an administration that belongs to the Ministry of the Interior; it is therefore in charge of the delivery of identity cards, driving licenses, passports, residency and work permits for foreigners, vehicle registration, registration of associations (creation, status modification, dissolution), as well as of the management of the National Police and firefighters, although as of 2018, 79% of firefighters in France are part-time volunteers.

Prefectures are usually located near the geographic centre of their departments; they were originally chosen for being within a day's travel on horseback from anywhere in the department. Therefore, the largest settlement in a department may not always be its prefecture: the department of Marne, for example, has its prefecture at Châlons-en-Champagne despite the city of Reims, near the Aisne border, being four times its size.

The prefect represents the national government at the local level and as such exercises the powers that are constitutionally attributed to the national government. The prefect issues ordinances written for the application of local law: to close a building that does not conform to safety codes, or modify vehicular traffic regulations (speed limit, construction permits).

The governing body of the department is the departmental council (French: Conseil départemental), which is elected through a system of cantons. It is in charge of the building and maintenance of middle schools (collèges) and departmental roads, financial assistance to dependent people (disabled and elderly), as well as promotion of local economic development, amongst other matters. In the past, the prefect was head of the department, but since 1982, the President of the Departmental Council has assumed the role of chief executive of the department.

== Parisian exception ==
Petite Couronne

There is an exception in Paris in the Île-de-France region and its three surrounding departments, known as the Petite Couronne ("Small Crown"): Hauts-de-Seine to the west, Seine-Saint-Denis to the northeast and Val-de-Marne to the southeast. These departments are administered by an additional separate unitary prefecture for law enforcement and security purposes, a Prefecture of Police (French: préfecture de police), known as the Paris Police Prefecture, a situation inherited from the Paris Commune of 1871. The power of law enforcement is usually vested in the mayor in other communes. This power is held by the Prefect of Police of Paris in the Petite Couronne.

In 2012, a similar structure was established in Bouches-du-Rhône, the Bouches-du-Rhône Police Prefecture, headed by the Prefect of Police of Bouches-du-Rhône, although it is formally less independent than that of Paris.

== Divisions of departments ==
Departments are divided into arrondissements, themselves divided into cantons. The chef-lieu d'arrondissement is the subprefecture (French: sous-préfecture). The official in charge is the subprefect (French: sous-préfet). There are relatively few competences associated to cantons, the most important one being the local organisation of elections, as cantons are electoral subdivisions.

== See also ==
- Administrative divisions of France
- Departments of France
- Regions of France
- Subprefectures in France
- National Police (France)
