= Louis Laugier =

French civil servant (born 1965)

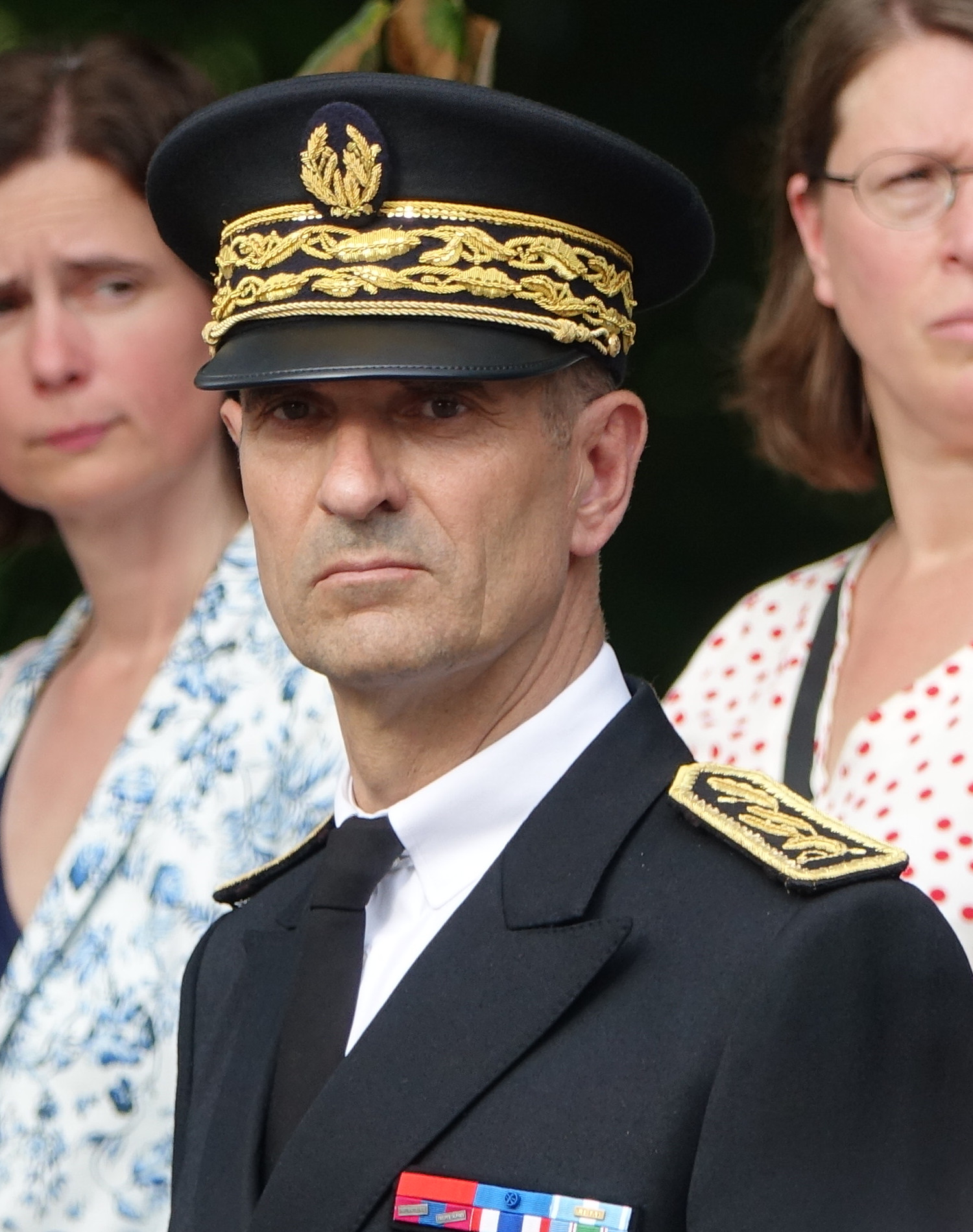
- Laugier in 2022

Director General of the National Police
- Incumbent
- Assumed office 4 November 2024
- Preceded by: Frédéric Veaux

Personal details
- Born: 2 September 1965 (age 61)

Louis Laugier (born 2 September 1965) is a French civil servant who has been serving as director general of the National Police since 2024. From 2023 to 2024, he served as prefect of Isère. From 2020 to 2023, he served as prefect of Haut-Rhin. From 2017 to 2020, he served as prefect of Savoie. From 2015 to 2017, he served as prefect of Aveyron.

== Honors and Awards ==
- Officer of the Order of Legion of Honour
- Officer of the Ordre National du Mérite
