= Prefect (France) =

State's representative in a French department or region

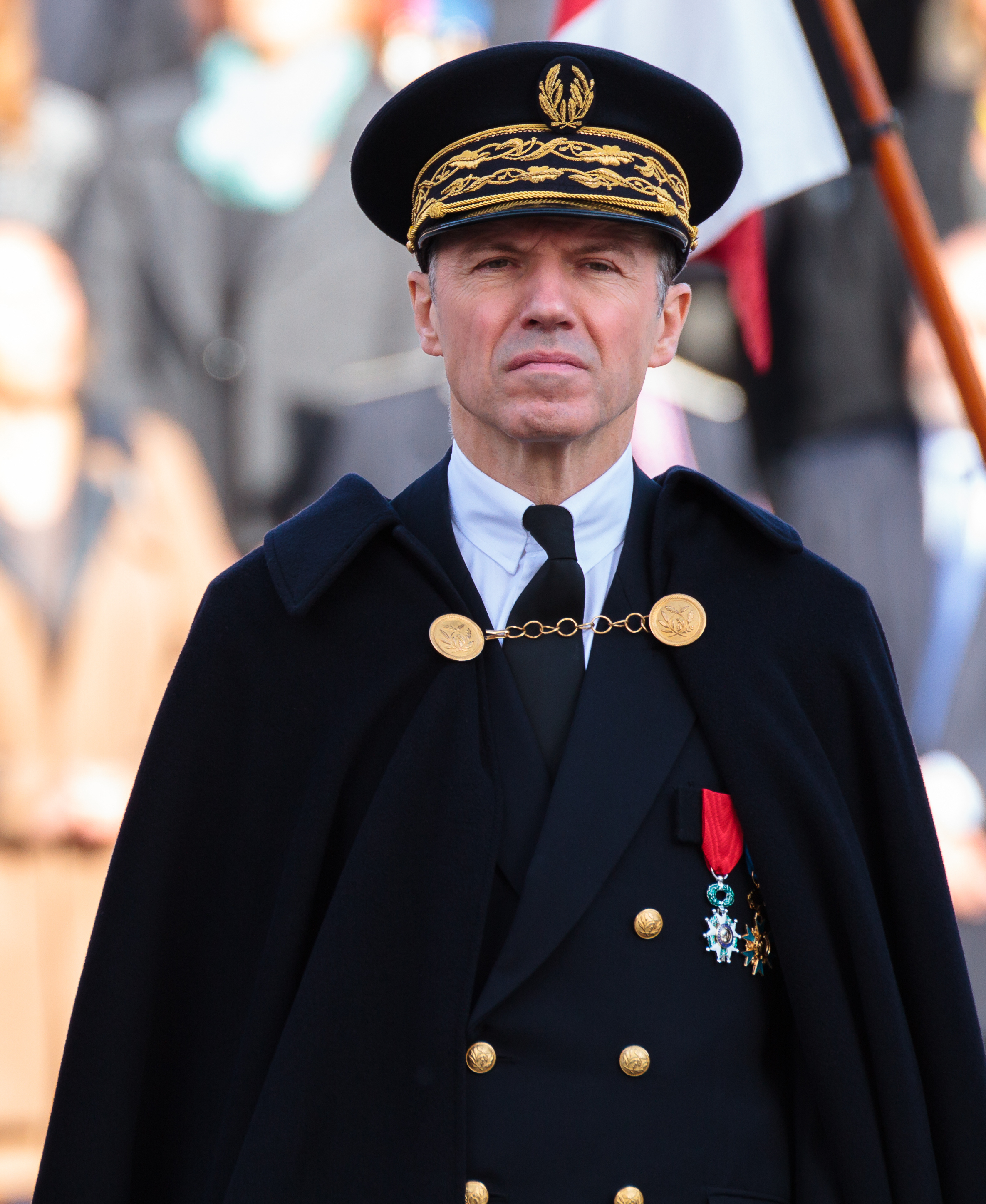
Pascal Mailhos, then prefect of the Haute-Garonne department, in Toulouse in 2014

A prefect (French: préfet, plural préfets, both [pʁefɛ]) in France is the State's representative in a department or region. Regional prefects are ex officio the departmental prefects of the regional prefecture. Prefects are tasked with upholding the law in the department they serve in, including controlling the actions of local authorities. Prefects are appointed by decree by the President of the French Republic when presiding over the government's Council of Ministers, following a proposal by the Prime Minister and the Minister of the Interior. They serve at the government's discretion and can be replaced at any meeting of the Council of Ministers.

To uphold the law, they are authorised to undertake a wide variety of actions, such as coordinating police forces, enforcing immigration rules, controlling authorities' finances, as well as suing local collectivities in the name of the State. The prefects in Lille, Rennes, Bordeaux, Marseille, Lyon and Strasbourg each have additional tasks as heads of their regional defence and security zone (zone de défense et de sécurité). In the Paris area, the prefect of police is the head of the local zone. Overseas France has a similar zones system.

Subprefects (sous-préfets) are responsible for the subdivisions of departments, known as arrondissements, when the arrondissement is not that of the prefecture. The office of a prefect is known as a prefecture and that of a subprefect a subprefecture. From 1982 to 1988, under the Socialist administration of President François Mitterrand, prefects were called commissaires de la République (the Republic's commissioners) and subprefects commissaires adjoints de la République (the Republic's deputy commissioners).

== Roles ==
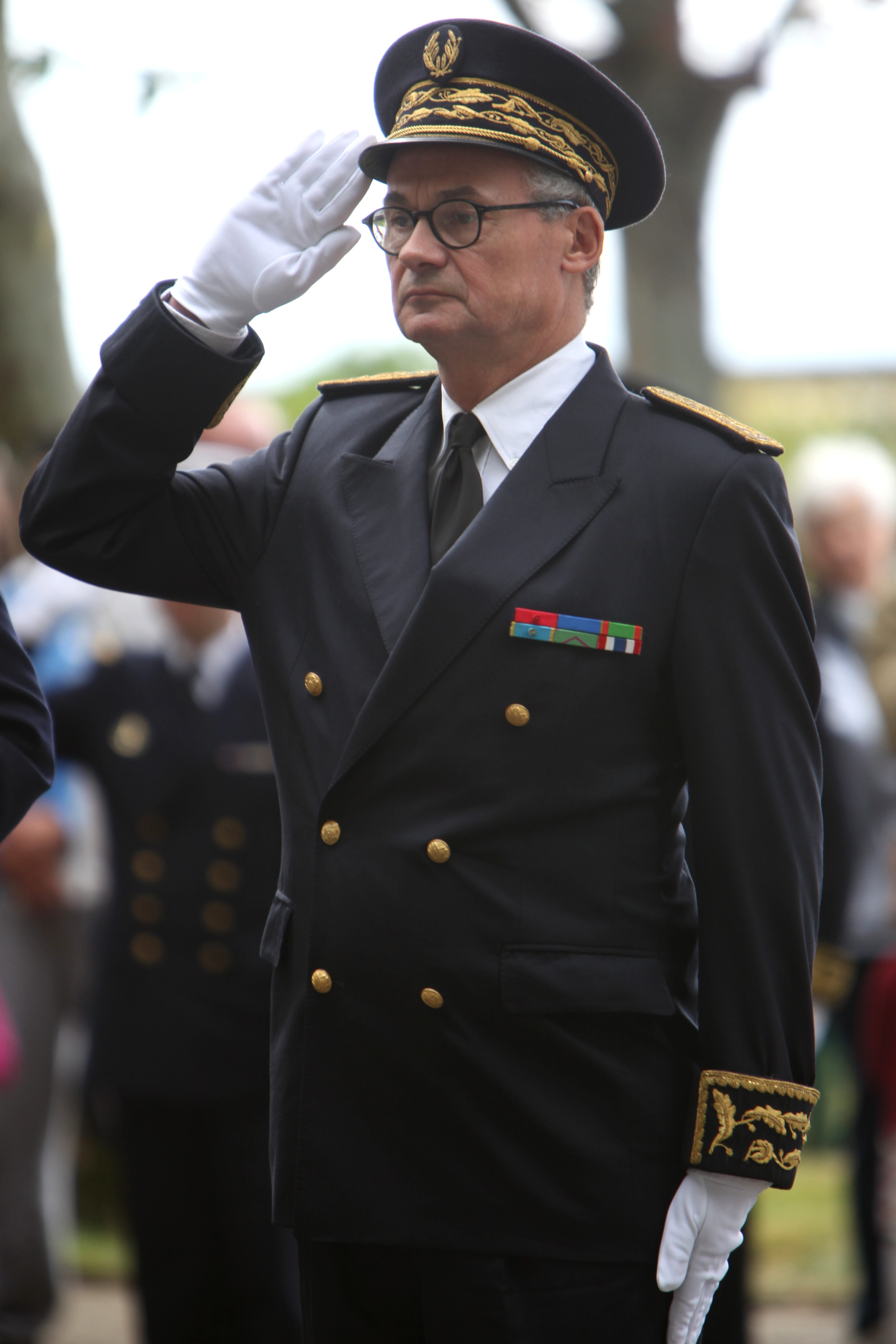
Jean-Luc Videlaine, then prefect of the Finistère department, in dress uniform at Bastille Day 2015 in Brest

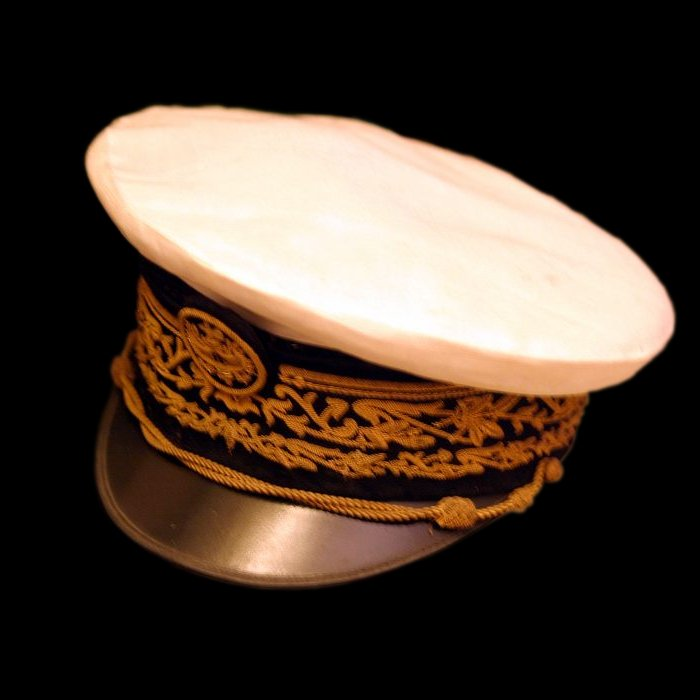
Uniform hat of a French prefect during the Second World War

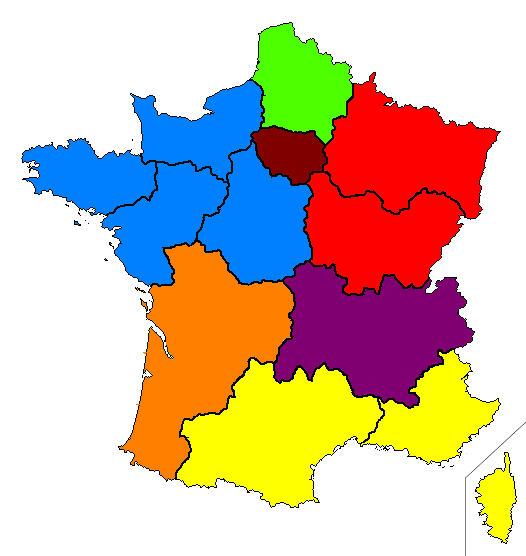
The seven metropolitan France defence and security zones (and their respective seats): Paris, Nord (Lille), Ouest (Rennes), Sud-Ouest (Bordeaux), Sud (Marseille), Sud-Est (Lyon) and Est (Strasbourg).

The post of prefect was first created on 17 February 1800 by then-First Consul Napoleon Bonaparte.

Their roles were initially similar to those of the pre-revolutionary intendants. Prefects were initially charged with supervising local governments in their department, ensuring that taxes flowed to Paris and supervising conscription at the local level.

Currently, the main role of the prefect is defined in article 72 of the Constitution of France:

In the local governments of the Republic, the representative of the State, representing each member of the Government, is in charge of national interests, of administrative checks, and the respect of Law.

The exact role and attributions are defined in decrees, most notably decrees of 1964, 1982, 2004, each replacing the preceding one.

The prefect of the département containing the chef-lieu de région is also the préfet de région, or the prefect of the région.

Prefects operate under the Minister of the Interior. Their main missions include:

- representing the State to local governments;
- security
  - the coordination of police and gendarmerie forces;
  - handling major crises;
  - emergency defence procedures;
- safety
  - the decision to evacuate zones facing natural disasters; the organisation of relief operations;
- responsibility for official documents, such as
  - the production of identity documents, including identity cards and passports;
  - the issuing of driving licences, and their administrative withdrawal in case of certain offences;
  - the application of immigration rules;
- ensuring respect for legality: officials working for the prefect verify the legality of decisions made by local governments and submit doubtful cases to administrative courts or to financial auditing courts.

Prefects may issue administrative orders in areas falling within the competency of the national government, including general safety. For instance, they may prohibit the use of certain roads without special tyres in times of snow. The prohibition on smoking or leaving the motor running while filling the fuel tank of a motor vehicle is another example of a matter typically decided by a prefectoral administrative order.

On official visits, prefects wear uniforms. In metropolitan France and Saint Pierre and Miquelon, the uniforms are dark blue; in the rest of overseas France, the uniforms are white.

For much of the time after 1800, the departments largely functioned as transmission belts for policies developed in Paris. As such, prefects originally had fairly extensive powers of supervision and control over departmental affairs. This was especially true during the Consulate and the First and Second Empires, when even the most trivial local matter had to be referred to the prefect. Since 1982, local government has been progressively decentralised, and the prefect's role has largely been limited to preventing local policies from conflicting with national policy.

At the commune level, prefects appoint a special delegation in cases of dissolution or resignation of the municipal council.

== Special cases ==
- In New Caledonia and French Polynesia, the prefect's roles, with certain differences in status, are fulfilled by a high commissioner; in Wallis and Futuna, by a superior administrator.
- The French Southern and Antarctic Lands used to be run by a superior administrator, but since 2004 are run by a prefect. The prefect, however, is not based in the territories, but in Réunion.
- The capital Paris, which is both a municipality (commune) and a department, is an exception. While it has a prefect, who is also prefect of the Île-de-France region, another prefect handles law enforcement in Paris and some surrounding areas, as well many other administrative duties: the Prefect of Police of Paris. In Paris, the law enforcement powers exercised in other French cities and towns by the mayor belong to the Prefect of Police. Additionally, for most of the time from 1800 to 1977, the prefect of Paris, and his predecessor, the prefect of the department of Seine, had direct control over city government, since Paris was the only commune in the country without a mayor.
- A Prefect of Police of Bouches-du-Rhône was also created in 2012 by the new Socialist administration, seated in Marseille, with similar powers to that of the Paris Prefect of Police.
- The authority of the State over the sea is exercised by the maritime prefect of the relevant region.
