= Groupe de sécurité de la présidence de la République =

French protective security unit

Security Group for the Presidency of the Republic
- Groupe de sécurité de la présidence de la République (French)
- Active: 1983 – present
- Country: France
- Agency: National Police
- Type: Protective security unit
- Part of: Service de la protection
- Headquarters: Paris
- Abbreviation: GSPR

Structure
- Officers: 78

Commanders
- Current commander: Georges Salinas

The Security Group for the Presidency of the Republic (French: Groupe de sécurité de la présidence de la République, GSPR) is the protective security unit in charge of the safety of the President of the French Republic. Established in 1983, it is part of both the National Gendarmerie and National Police. It is distinct from the Republican Guard, which is in charge of the security of official buildings.

== History ==
In the past, the group was composed of 30 members of the National Gendarmerie and 30 members of the National Police, commanded by a lieutenant colonel of the Gendarmerie or a Commissaire divisionnaire de Police, alternately in charge. Since 2019, the Director of the GSPR has been Georges Salinas of the National Police, assisted by colonel Benoît Ferrand of the National Gendarmerie.

During the presidency of Nicolas Sarkozy, the unit was only composed of policemen from the Service de la protection and from the Recherche Assistance Intervention Dissuasion (RAID) unit. During his administration, the unit had 90 members because of higher threat levels. No Gendarmerie officers were selected to be in the unit as Sarkozy believed he should not be protected by the military.

Gendarmerie officers came back to the unit after the election of François Hollande in 2012. In December 2012, there were about 20 gendarmes detached from the GIGN. The group has then been composed of 60 members again until 2017.

During Emmanuel Macron's presidency, the GSPR has been reinforced to reach nearly 80 members, the first half being police officers of the SDLP, while the second half being gendarmes of the GIGN.

== Equipment ==
In addition to an extensive fleet, GSPR members are armed with the following weapons:

- ASP expandable baton;
- Glock 17 pistol;
- Glock 26 pistol;
- Heckler & Koch MP5 sub-machine guns;
- Brügger & Thomet MP9 sub-machine guns;
- Heckler & Koch G36 assault rifles.
