= Service de la protection =

Section of the French national police

Protection Service
- Service de la protection (French)
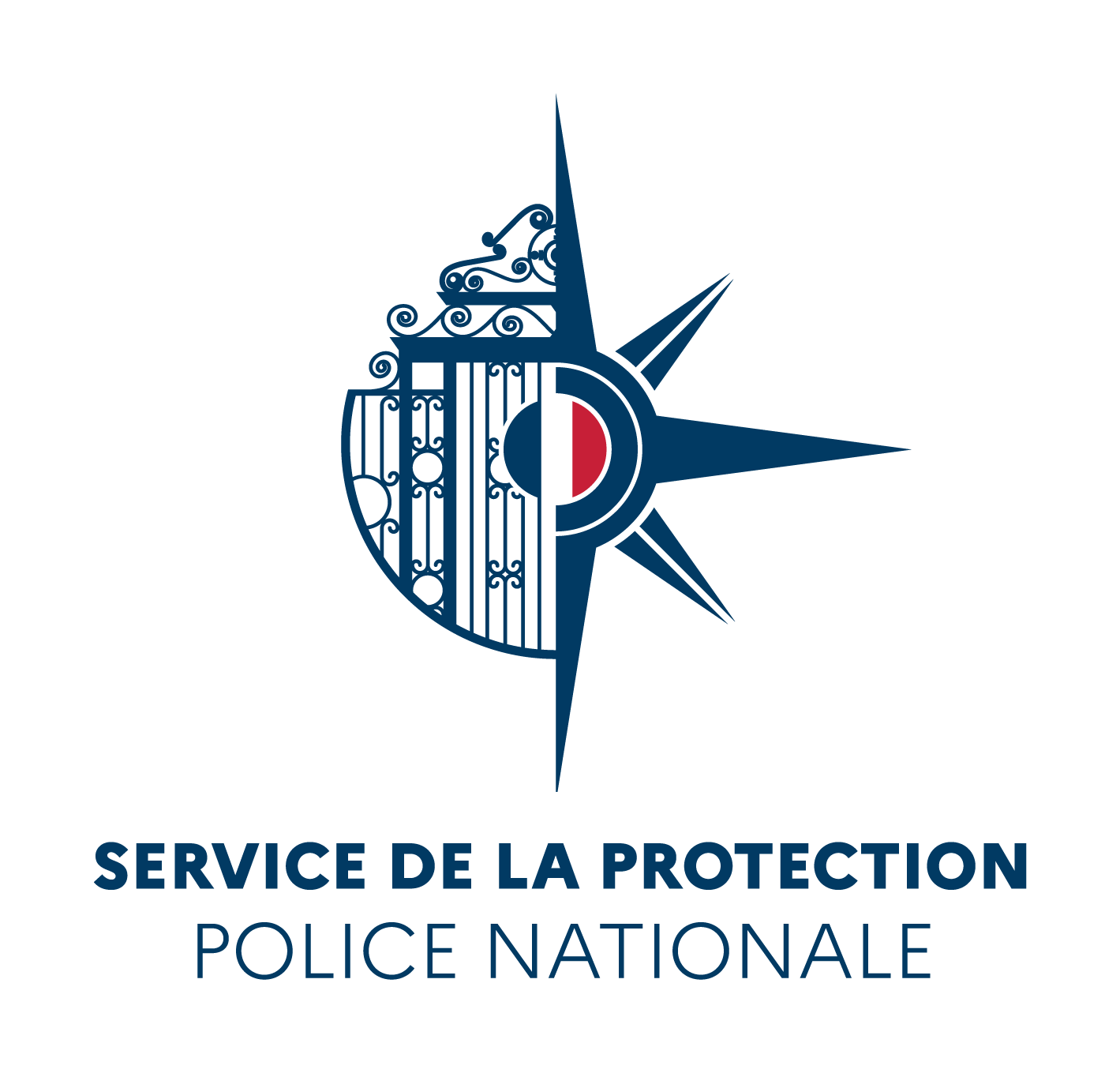
- Active: 2 October 2013 – present
- Country: France
- Agency: National Police
- Type: Close personal protection
- Part of: Direction générale de la Police nationale
- Headquarters: Paris
- Abbreviation: SDLP

Structure
- Officers: 1,260

The Protection Service (French: Service de la protection, (SDLP)) is a unit of the French National Police responsible for the protection of French and foreign dignitaries and the provision of technical security support. The SDLP also implements the necessary measures for the organization and security of official visits in France and abroad.

== Organization ==
The service has 1,260 police officers and is headquartered on rue de Miromesnil in Paris near the Ministry of the Interior and the Palais de l'Élysée. The SDLP also has a permanent office in Strasbourg; home to several European institutions, including the European Parliament. Its members are recruited from within the National Police, after two years minimum service in the National Police.

The Service de Protection des Hautes Personnalités includes:

- Headquarters
- Security Group of the Presidency of the Republic (GSPR) tasked with protecting the President of France
- Sub-directorate for personal protection (SDPP) tasked with protecting members of the government, civilians, foreign dignitaries, and includes the:
  - Security Group of the Prime Minister (GSPM)
  - Security Group of the Ministry of Interior (GSMI)
- Sub-directorate for security (SDS)
- Sub-directorate of resources and operational support (SDRMM)

The SPHP was established in 1934 under the name of "Official Travel Service" ("Voyages officiels" (VO) in French) after the assassination of King Alexander I of Yugoslavia and Louis Barthou in Marseille. It adopted its current name in 1994.

The SPHP was headed by Inspector General Jean-Louis Fiamenghi, who assumed the post in November 2007. Inspector General Fiamenghi had been head of Recherche Assistance Intervention Dissuasion (RAID), another unit within the National Police.

In June 2010, a report by the Cour des comptes mentioned, among the persons enjoying SPHP protection, former prime ministers Dominique de Villepin and Jean-Pierre Raffarin, the former ministers of the interior Pierre Joxe, Jean-Pierre Chevènement and Charles Pasqua, wives of former presidents Danielle Mitterrand and Bernadette Chirac, the former candidates for the 2007 presidential election François Bayrou and Ségolène Royal, the former hostage and parliamentarian Ingrid Betancourt, the former minister Michel Charasse, and the president of MEDEF Laurence Parisot.

In 2013, as part of the reform of the central administration of the ministries of the Interior and Overseas, the service was renamed the "Service de la protection" (SDLP) and includes in its organization chart the "Security Service of the Ministry of the Interior" (SSMI) and the "Central Automobile Service" (SCA).

== Equipment ==
In addition to an extensive fleet, SDLP members are armed with the following weapons:

- Glock pistols
- Heckler & Koch MP5 submachine guns
- Heckler & Koch G36 assault rifles
