= National Police (France) =

Civil police force of France

National Police Police nationale
- Motto: Pro patria vigilant (They are watching for their country)

Agency overview
- Formed: 23 April 1941 (unification of existing units)
- Preceding agency: Sûreté nationale (1944–1966)
- Employees: 154,547 (2021)
- Annual budget: €12.64 billion (2021)

Jurisdictional structure
- National agency: France
- Operations jurisdiction: France
- Area: 551,695 km^{2}
- Population: 67.2 million
- General nature: Local civilian police

Operational structure
- Overseen by: General Directorate of the National Police
- Headquarters: Paris, France
- Minister responsible: Laurent Nuñez, Minister of the Interior
- Agency executive: Louis Laugier, Director General
- Parent agency: Ministry of the Interior
- Child agency: National Guard (partly)
- Directorates: List of Directorates: Direction de l'administration de la police nationale; Direction de la formation de police nationale; Direction centrale de la police judiciaire; Direction centrale de la sécurité publique; Direction centrale de la police aux frontières; Inspection générale de la police nationale; Direction centrale des compagnies républicaines de sécurité; Service de coopération technique internationale de police; Service de protection des hautes personnalités; Préfecture de police; Recherche Assistance Intervention Dissuasion

Facilities
- Vehicles: 31,263 (2021)
- Helicopters: 0 (see Sécurité Civile)

Website
- www.police-nationale.interieur.gouv.fr (in French)

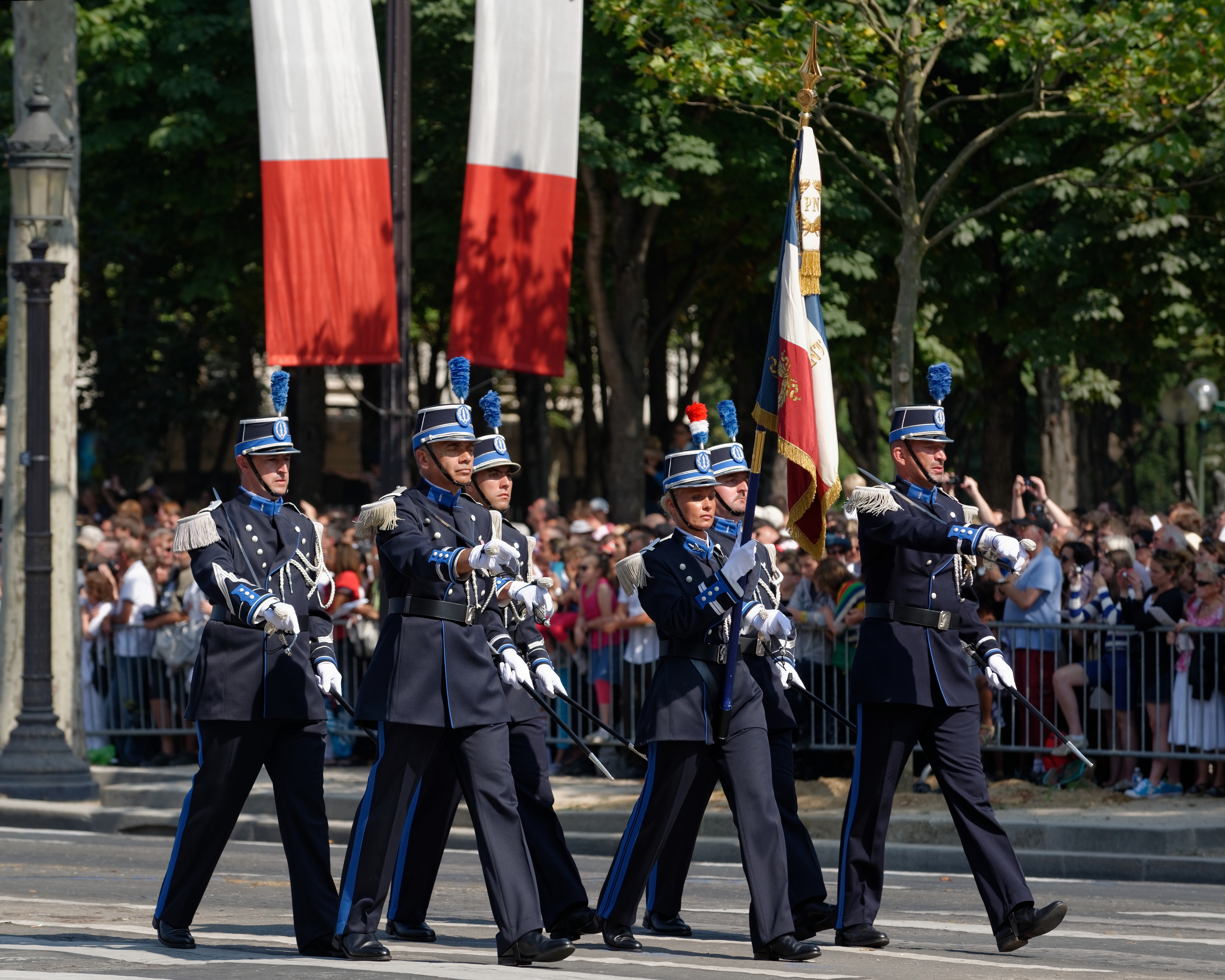
Colour guard of the General Directorate of the National Police, 2013 Bastille Day parade, Paris

The National Police (French: Police nationale, pronounced [pɔlis nɑsjɔnal]), formerly known as the Sûreté nationale, is one of two national police forces of France, the other being the National Gendarmerie. The National Police is the country's main civil law enforcement agency, with primary jurisdiction in cities and large towns. By contrast, the National Gendarmerie has primary jurisdiction in smaller towns, as well as in rural and border areas. The National Police comes under the jurisdiction of the Ministry of the Interior and has about 145,200 employees (as of 2015). Young French citizens can fulfill their optional national service (Service national universel) in the national police force.

The National Police operates mostly in cities and large towns. In that context, it conducts security operations such as patrols, traffic control and identity checks. Under the orders and supervision of investigating magistrates of the judiciary, it conducts criminal inquiries and serves search warrants. It also maintains specific services ('judicial police') for these inquiries.

== History ==
The national police force was created on 14 August 1941, under the Vichy regime, by a decree signed by the head of government, Philippe Pétain. This decree implements the law of 23 April 1941, creating the Police nationale: the forces of the Sûreté nationale (with the former services of the Sûreté générale, which became the Sûreté nationale in 1934, and the municipal police units, which became "étatisées" for the police forces of towns with more than 10,000 inhabitants) and the police services of the Préfecture de police in Paris are thus united. It was dissolved after the Liberation, by order of the Provisional Government of the French Republic on 16 November 1944. It was revived by Law no. 66-492 of 9 July 1966, on the organization of the police in France. This law unified the Sûreté Nationale and the Préfecture de Police.

== Organization ==
The National Police is commanded by the Director-General (directeur général de la police nationale), who is currently Louis Laugier. The Director-General is personally in command of the General Directorate of the National Police (French: Direction Générale de la Police nationale) (DGPN) and responsible to the Minister of the Interior.

The Prefect of Police manages the Préfecture de Police de Paris that includes all police and security services in Paris, the three neighbouring departments of the 'la petite couronne' region (Hauts-de-Seine, Seine-Saint-Denis and Val-de-Marne), and the airports of Roissy, Orly and Le Bourget. The Paris Police Prefecture is a separate law enforcement jurisdiction. While its officers belong to the National Police, their chief (the Police Prefect) acts completely independently from the Director-General of the National Police, reporting directly to the French Minister of the Interior. The elevated status of the Paris Police Prefect is also underlined by the fact that he/she is also head of the Île-de-France Defence and Security Zone (Zone de défense et de sécurité Île-de-France). The police forces in the other departments of the Île-de-France region are under the direct command of a Préfet (Department Prefect), being himself under the supervision of the Préfet de Police as far as the active on-the-field police work is concerned, and under the control of the Director-General for the rest.

The National Police is subdivided into (central) directorates, which are further composed of sub-directorates:

- Direction centrale du recrutement et de la formation de la Police nationale (Central Directorate for Recruitment and Training of the National Police; DCRFPN): formed from the fusion of the former Direction de la formation de police nationale (Directorate of Training of the National Police; DFPN) and Direction de l'administration de la police nationale (Directorate of Administration of the National Police; DAPN). It was established on 1 September 2010 and employs approximately 3 000 people.
- Direction Nationale de la Police judiciaire (National Directorate of the Judicial Police; DNPJ): charged with all criminal investigations under direction of magistrates. This mission is fulfilled in the Paris area by the Direction Régionale de Police Judiciaire de Paris which is nicknamed after its address "36 Quai des Orfèvres" (often without the number), and is a metonym for the Police generally; the national headquarters of the PJ, as it is usually called in French, are actually located at 11 rue des Saussaies, within the Ministry of the Interior). The main Sub-Directorates of the Judicial Police are:
  - L’office anti-stupéfiants "OFAST" (Anti-Narcotics Office): Responsible investigating drug trafficking networks in the country and coordinating national drug control efforts with other agencies such as police and customs.
  - Sous-direction de lutte contre la criminalité organisée et de la délinquance spécialisée "SDLCODS" (Sub-Directorate for Combating Organized Crime and Specialized Delinquency). Includes all the National Investigation Offices specializing in Organized and Financial Crime, except for the National Itinerant Criminality Struggle Office (which falls under the Gendarmerie Nationale):
    - L’office central de lutte contre le crime organisé "OCLCO" (Central Office for Combating Organized Crime): Specializes in investigating armed banditry (kidnapping, murder, robbery and rape) by organized criminal groups.
    - L’office central pour la répression de la traite des êtres humains "OCRTEH" (Central Office for the Repression of Human Trafficking): Combats sexual exploitation crimes like sex trafficking and pimping.
    - L’office central pour la répression du faux monnayage "OCRFM" (Central Office for the Suppression of Counterfeiting): Investigates counterfeiting of currency and industrial goods (tobacco, branded products).
    - L’office central de lutte contre le trafic de biens culturels "OCBC" (Central Office for Combating Trafficking in Cultural Goods): Specializes in investigating the theft and trafficking of art and artifacts from foreign archaeological sites.
    - L’office central pour la répression des violences aux personnes "OCRVP" (Central Office for the Repression of Violence Against Persons): Handles particularly complex cases involving crimes against persons including cold cases, hate crimes, sectarian violence, and crimes committed against French nationals abroad.
    - L’office mineurs "OFMIN" (Office for Minors): Specializes in combating violence against children including school harassment, child pornography, and family sexual violence.
  - Sous-direction de lutte contre la criminalité financière "SDLCF" (Sub-Directorate for Combating Financial Crime): Consists of two sub-directorates:
    - L’office central pour la répression de la grande délinquance financière "OCRGDF" (Central Office for the Repression of Major Financial Crime): Specializes in investigating major money laundering cases.
    - L’office central de lutte contre la corruption et les infractions financières et fiscales "OCLCIFF" (Central Office for Combating Corruption and Financial and Tax Offenses)
  - Sous-direction anti-terroriste "SDAT" (Anti-Terrorist Sub-Directorate): elite counter-terrorist task-force.
  - Sous-Direction de la police technique et scientifique "SDPTS" (Sub-directorate of forensics and crime scene investigation)
  - L’office anti-cybercriminalité "OFAC" (The Office for the Fight Against Cybercrime): Investigates major instances of cyberattacks against computer systems and illegal activities on the dark web.
  - Le service central des courses et jeux "SCCJ" (Central Racing and Gaming Service): Responsible for enforcing national laws on gambling and handles litigation related to racing and gaming.
  - La sous-direction de la stratégie et du pilotage territorial (Sub-directorate for Strategy and Territorial Management): The newest sub-directorate created on July 1, 2023 whose objective is to promote and implement the policies created by the central and territorial judicial police services, with the goal of improving inter-agency cooperation, coordinating victim support services, and conduct criminological research.
- Direction nationale de la sécurité publique (National Directorate of Public Security; DNSP): Patrol and response duties, misdemeanour investigations, emergency help; this Directorate comprises approximately 80% of the workforce. The DNSP is the National Police's equivalent of the Departmental Gendarmerie.
  - Central apparatus (l'Échelon central)
  - 92 départemental directorates in metropolitan France (sing. Direction Départementale de la Sécurité Publique (DDSP), followed by the département's number. For example the DDSP 62 is the Departement Public Security Directorate of Pas-de-Calais).
  - The three départements of the 'petit couronne' region (Seine-Saint-Denis, Hauts-de-Seine and Val-de-Marne) were absorbed into the Paris Police Prefecture by Presidential Decree No. 2009-898 of 24 July 2009 and fused into the Proximity Security Directorate of the Parisian Agglomeration (Direction de la Sécurité de Proximité de l'Agglomération Parisienne (DSPAP)), which includes four Proximity Security Territorial Directorates (sing. Direction Territoriale de Sécurité de Proximité (DTSP)): DTSP 75 for the city of Paris; DTSP 92 in Nanterre for Hauts-de-Seine; DTSP 93 in Bobigny for Seine-Saint-Denis and DTSP 94 in Créteil for Val-de-Marne.
  - 7 overseas directorates: Guadeloupe, Martinique, Guyane, La Réunion, New Caledonia, French Polynesia and Mayotte.
- Direction nationale de la police aux frontières (National Directorate of Border Police; DNPAF): performs identity checks with "La douane française" (official name: Direction générale des Douanes et Droits Indirects) and handles illegal immigration.
- Inspection générale de la police nationale (General Inspectorate of the National Police, IGPN): headed by the Inspector General and responsible for internal affairs. In the Paris Area, these tasks are assigned to a dedicated service—the Inspection Générale des Services (General Inspectorate of the Services).
- Direction centrale des compagnies républicaines de sécurité (Central Directorate of the Republican Security Companies; DCCRS): riot police, motorway police, and mountain rescue; commonly referred to as the CRS.
- Service de coopération technique internationale de police (Technical International Police Cooperation Service; SCTIP).
- Service de la protection (Important Persons Protection Service; SDLP): VIP protection for people such as foreign diplomats and also responsible for the protection of the President of the French Republic through the 'Groupe de Sécurité de la Présidence de la République'.
- Recherche Assistance Intervention Dissuasion (Research, Assistance, Intervention, Deterrence; RAID) The elite counter-terror unit of the National Police and counterpart to the GIGN of the National Gendarmerie. The commander of RAID also doubles as the chief of the National Police Intervention Force (French abbreviation FIPN). The RAID is headquartered in Bièvres, Essonne, approximately 20 kilometres (12 miles) southwest of Paris. As it is on standby for deployment nationwide, the primary intervention unit for reaction in Paris is the Brigade anticommando (BRI-BAC) - the Research and Intervention Brigade of the Paris Police Prefecture's Judicial Police Regional Directorate. The function of the FIPN is that of a coordinating organ between the RAID and the BRI. The RAID used to operate closely with the UCLAT (Unité de Coordination de la Lutte Antiterroriste, Counterterror Coordination Unit). On 27 December 2019 the UCLAT was absorbed into the Direction Générale de la Sécurité Intérieure', the French domestic intelligence and security agency and the latter took over the close co-operation with the RAID.
  - Territorial Detachments. The Central Directorate of Public Security - the National Police's public order uniformed branch had its own tactical intervention units, the Groupes d'Intervention de la Police Nationale (Intervention Groups of the National Police (GIPN)).Between 2016 and 2019 these units were absorbed into the RAID as its territorial detachments (antennes RAID).
    - 10 territorial detachments in metropolitan France: Bordeaux, Lille, Lyon, Marseille, Nice, Rennes, Strasbourg, Montpellier, Nancy and Toulouse;
    - 3 territorial detachments in the French overseas territories: Nouméa in New Caledonia, Pointe-à-Pitre in Guadeloupe and Saint-Denis in Réunion.

=== Former directorates ===
As of 1 July 2008, the following two National Police directorates:

- Direction de la surveillance du territoire (Directorate of Territorial Surveillance; DST) – counter-intelligence, counterespionage, counterterrorism
- Direction centrale des renseignements généraux (Central Directorate of General Information; DCRG or RG) – police intelligence, records, research, analysis (and also policing gambling and horse racing, two activities which are now in the hands of the "Service central des courses et jeux" SCCJ, a unit of the Judicial Police) were merged into one single domestic intelligence agency titled the Direction centrale du renseignement intérieur (DCRI). The DCRI was placed directly under the Ministry of the Interior.

== Ranks ==
The National Police is divided into three corps, in the terminology of the French Civil Service, in ascending order of seniority:

- The Corps d'encadrement et d'application (Management and Enforcement Corps) corresponds approximately to the enlisted and non-commissioned ranks in a military force, or to constables and sergeants in a British-style civil police force.
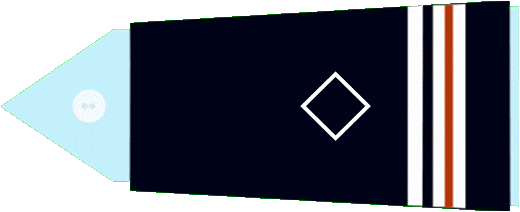
Major, responsable d’unité locale de police

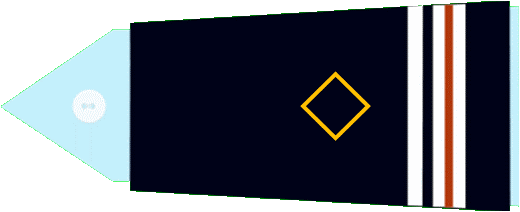
Major à l’échelon exceptionnel

Major

Brigadier-chef

Gardien de la paix (keeper of the peace)

Gardien de la paix stagiaire (keeper of the peace, intern") 1st year after school
- The Corps de commandement (Command Corps) corresponds approximately to the lower commissioned ranks of a military force, or the grades of inspector and chief inspector in a British-style civil police force. These ranks were previously known as inspecteurs if detectives or officiers de la paix if uniformed, although CRS officers always used the current ranks.
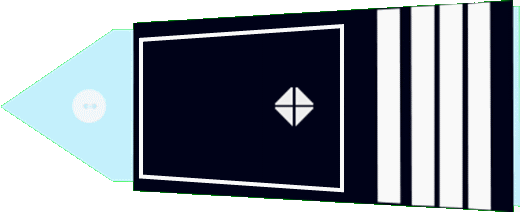
Commandant divisionnaire functionnel
Same insignia as Commandant but with silver pip

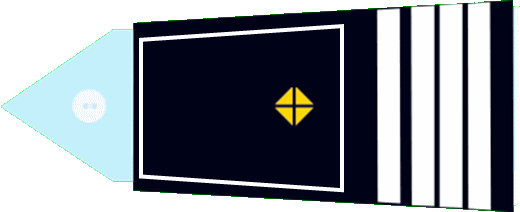
Commandant divisionnaire
Same insignia as Commandant but with gold pip

Commandant (formerly Commandant or Inspecteur divisionnaire)

Capitaine (formerly Officer de la paix principal or Inspecteur principal)

Lieutenant (formerly Officier de la paix or Inspecteur)

Lieutenant de police (stagiaire)

Lieutenant de police - Élève
- The Corps de conception et de direction (Conception and Direction Corps) corresponds approximately to the higher commissioned ranks of a military force, or to grades of Superintendent and chief officers in a British-style civil police force.
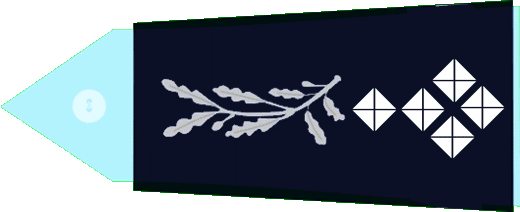
Directeur général
(Director general of the National Police)

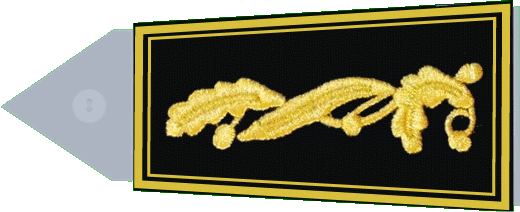
Préfet de police de Paris/
Préfet de police des Bouches-du-Rhône
(Police Prefect of Paris/
Police Prefect of Bouches-du-Rhône)

Directeur des services actifs
(Director of the Active Services) Equivalent of a Deputy Commissioner in London in a British-style police force

Inspecteur général
(Inspector General). This is the equivalent of an Assistant Commissioner in Metropolitan Police of London.

Contrôleur général
(Controller General), the equivalent of Deputy Assistant Commissioner in the Metropolitan Police

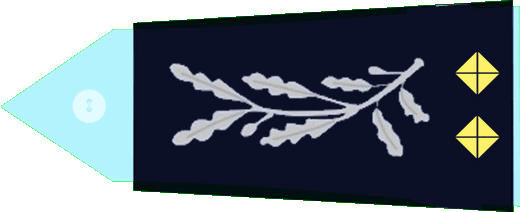
Commissaire general
(Commissioner General)

Commissaire divisionnaire
(Divisional Commissioner of police)

Commissaire de police (Commissioner of police)

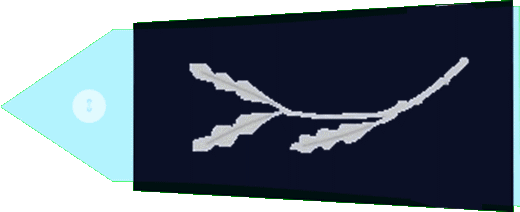
Commissaire de police - Élève et stagiaire (Probationary Commissioner of police)

All the ranks insignia may be worn either on the shoulders or on the chest. In the latter they are square-shaped.

Prior to 1995 two civilian corps ("Inspecteurs" and "Enquêteurs") existed in which plainclothes officers were given the training and authority to conduct investigations. The closest American equivalent is the detective branch.

== Requirements ==
Admission requirements for the competition:

- 35 years old maximum on January 1st of the competition year
- Bachelor's degree or equivalent
- French nationality
- Clean criminal record
- Good physical condition, good moral standing

The entrance exam has 3 stages:

To pass the entrance exam, a candidate must pass several tests: the eligibility test, the pre-admission test and the admission test.

The eligibility test consists of written exams (general knowledge, solving a practical case, law and criminal procedure tests). If this test is passed, you must then take the pre-admission tests (physical exercise tests), and if this stage is completed, the competition will end with the admission test (psychotechnical tests, interview with the jury).

Once accepted, the paid training for police officers at the police academy lasts 18 months.

== Equipment ==
=== Weapons ===
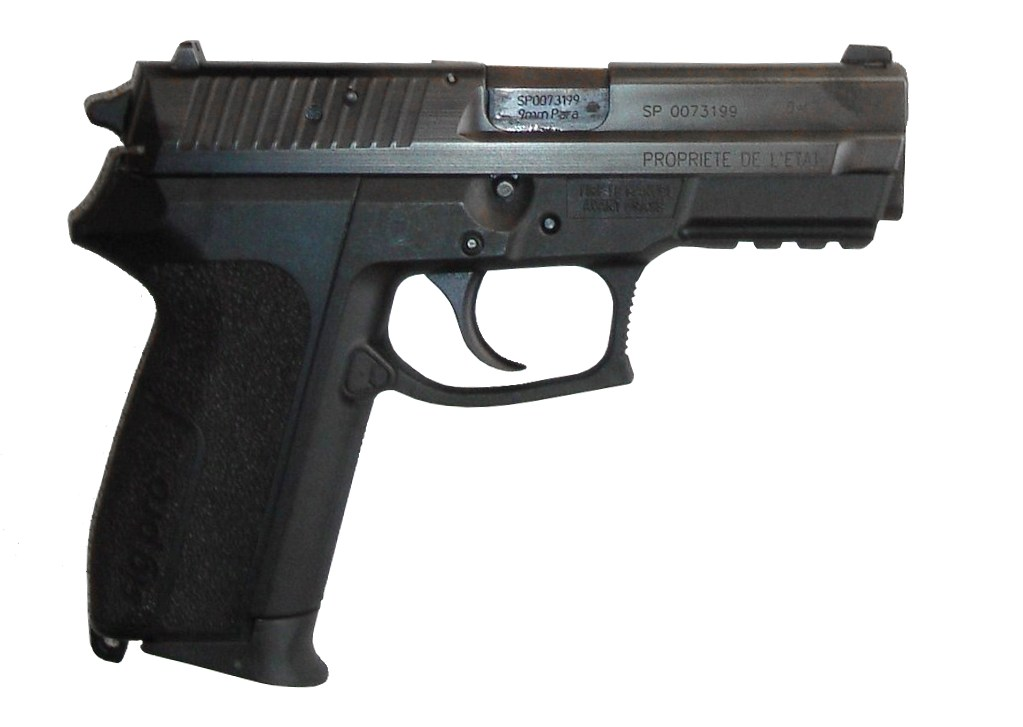
SP 2022, the present standard issued sidearm of French police officers

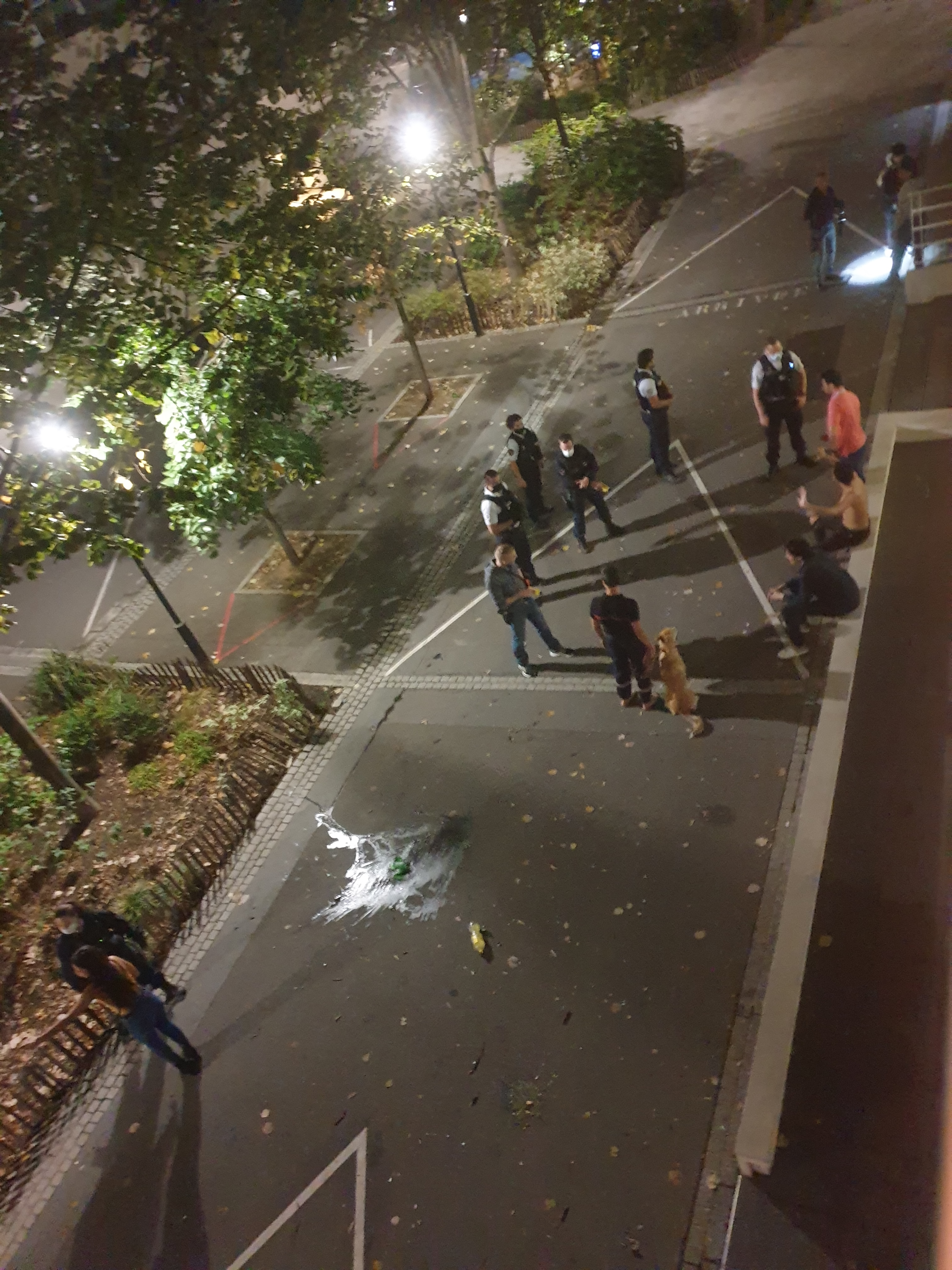
Intervention in 2020 of a police team in Courbevoie. Policemen are equipped with tasers.

Prior to the Second World War and the formation of the Police Nationale, the French police used a variety of side arms, both revolvers and semi-automatic pistols, notably comprising the MAS 1873, the MAS 1892, the FN M1900, Ruby pistols, and a variety of privately purchased weapons.

Immediately after the Second World War, a variety of military side arms were issued, often captured weapons provided by the Army or French-produced German-designed weapons, such as the Mauser HSc or the Walther P38 for sidearms, and the Karabiner 98k rifle, to the now unified national force.

In 1951, a standardisation was performed on the RR 51 pistol in 7.65×17mm and on the MAS-38 and MAT-49 for submachine guns. From 1953, in the context of heightening violence of the Algeria War, CRS units were upgraded to the 9×19mm MAC Mle 1950.

In the early 1960s, large-caliber revolvers were introduced, culminating with the introduction of the Manurhin MR 73 and the Ruger SP101. In the 80s, a process to standardize revolvers was initiated. The 1970s also saw the introduction of automatic rifles and carbines (such as the SIG SG 543) to fend off heavily armed organised crime and terrorism.

In the 2000s, the police started switching to semi-automatic pistols and to the 9×19mm Parabellum cartridge. For some years, the standard sidearm in the National Police and the Gendarmerie Nationale was the PAMAS G1, which was French licensed and made. In 2003 both agencies made the biggest small arms contract since the Second World War for about 250,000 SIG Sauer Pro SP 2022s, a custom-tailored variant of the SIG Pro, replacing the PAMAS-G1 and several other pistols in service. The weapons are planned to stay in service until the year 2022, hence the weapon name. The police purchased more pistols in late 2018 possibly indicating they intend them to be used beyond 2022.

For greater threats the police use slightly modified Ruger Mini-14 semi-automatic rifles purchased in the 1970s. More modern long guns like the Remington 870 shotgun, H&K UMP submachine gun and the FAMAS & H&K G36 select fire assault rifles are also issued to certain tactical units. Some of the elite Gendarme and National Police units like RAID and SDAT have adopted short-barreled rifle (SBR) versions of the French Army's newest assault rifle, the HK416F.

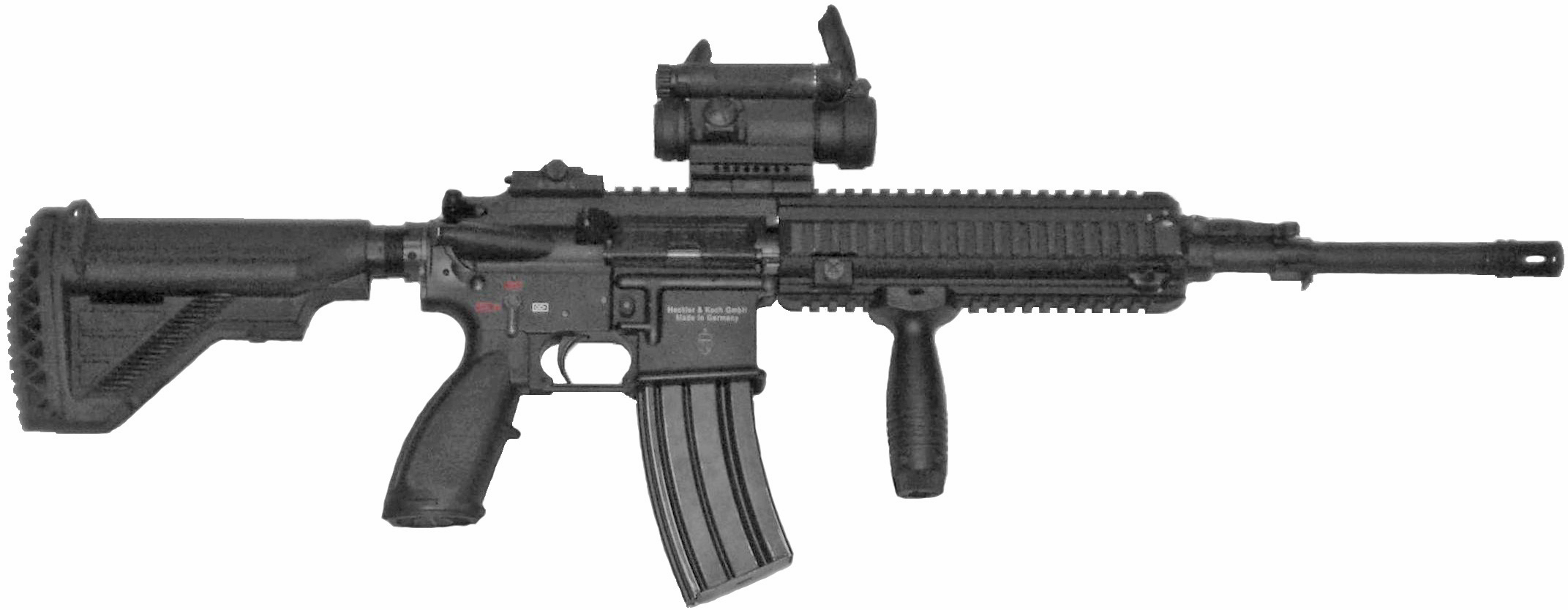
Heckler & Koch HK416.

=== Cars ===
While the vast majority of vehicles are screen printed French brands (mainly Renault, Citroën and Peugeot), some service vehicles are provided by Ford and Opel. Plainclothes officers or specialised branches use vehicles from a variety of manufacturers. Highway patrol units also began using Alpine 110s in 2021.

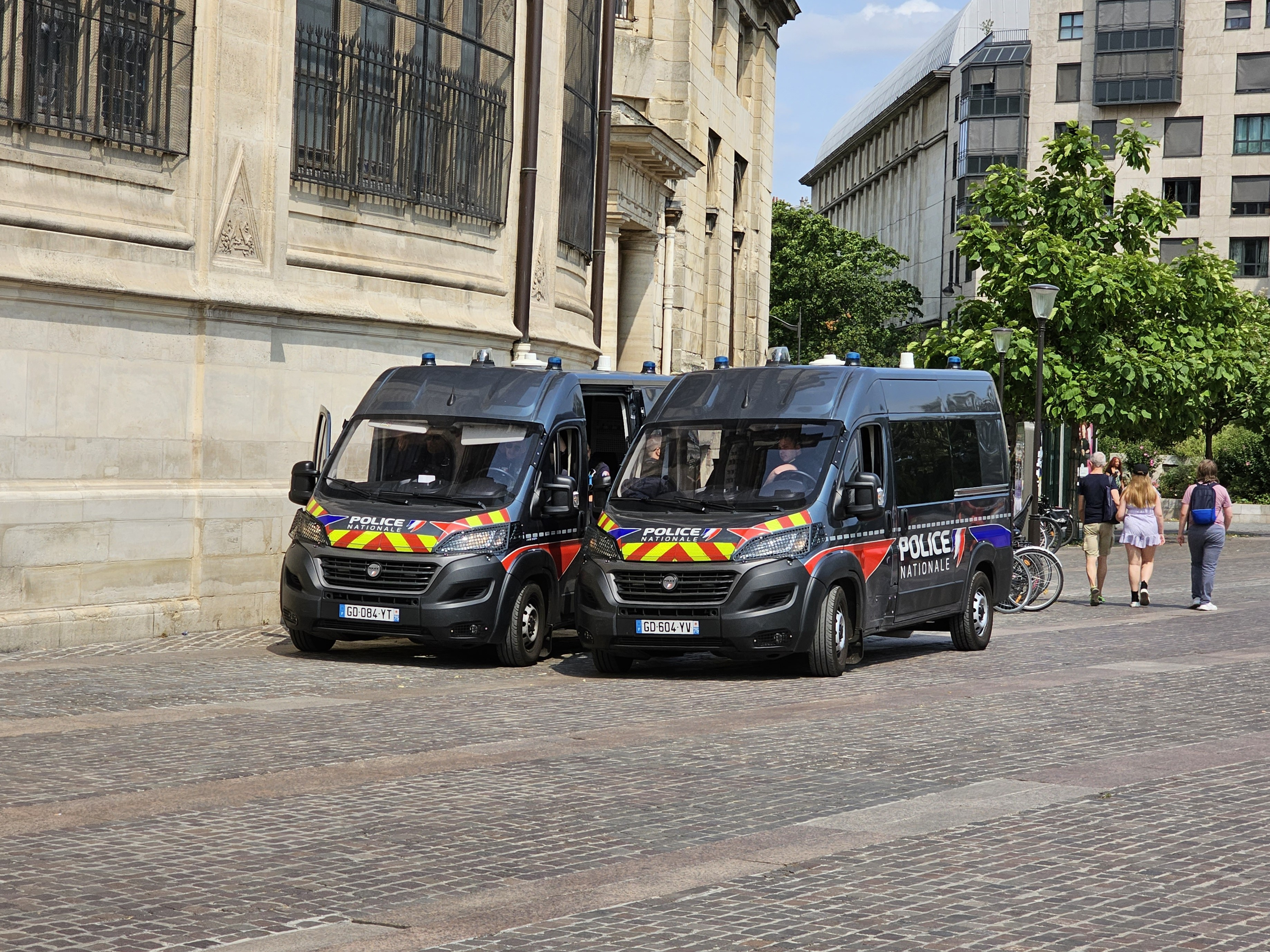
Fiat Ducato

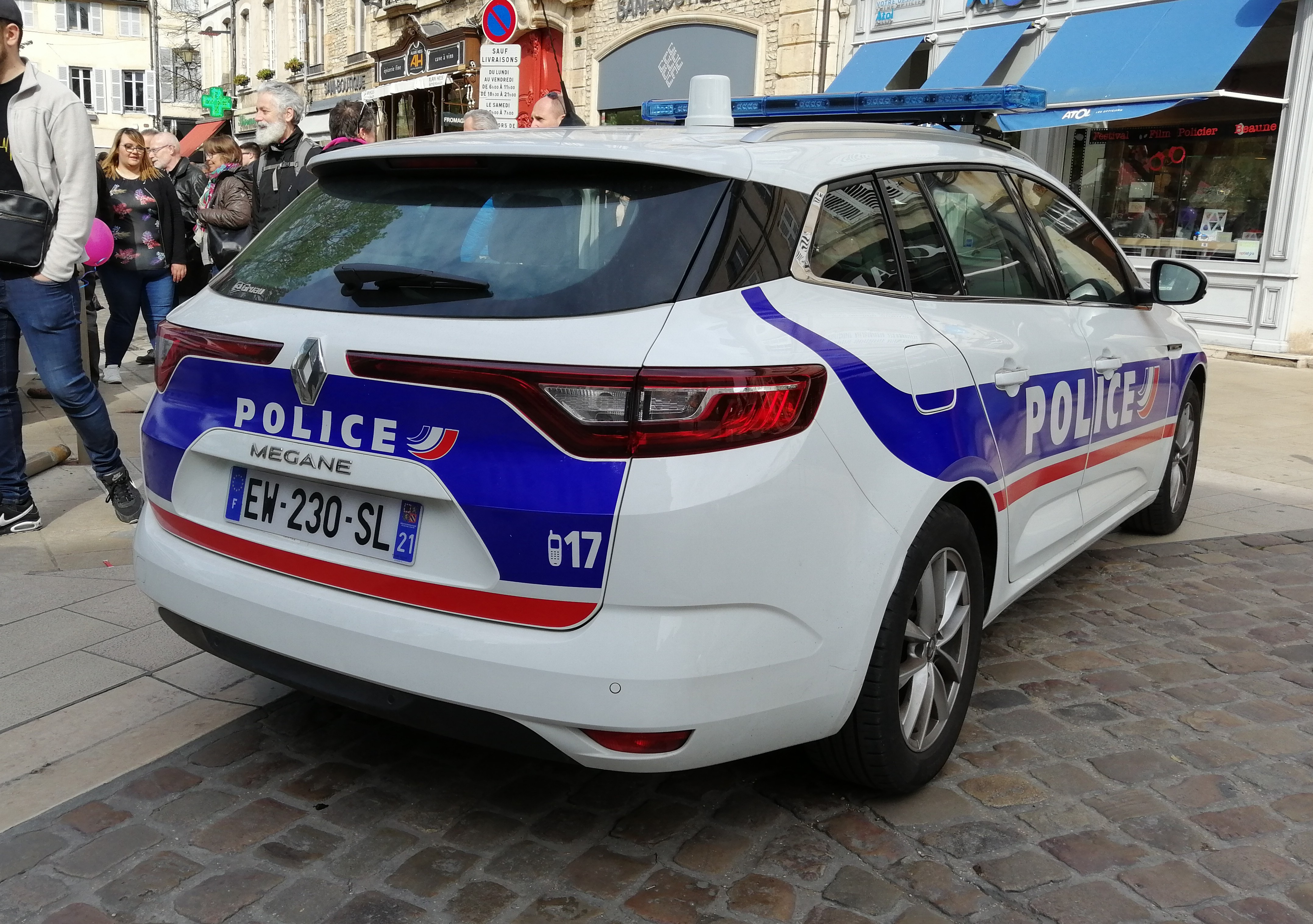
Renault Mégane IV

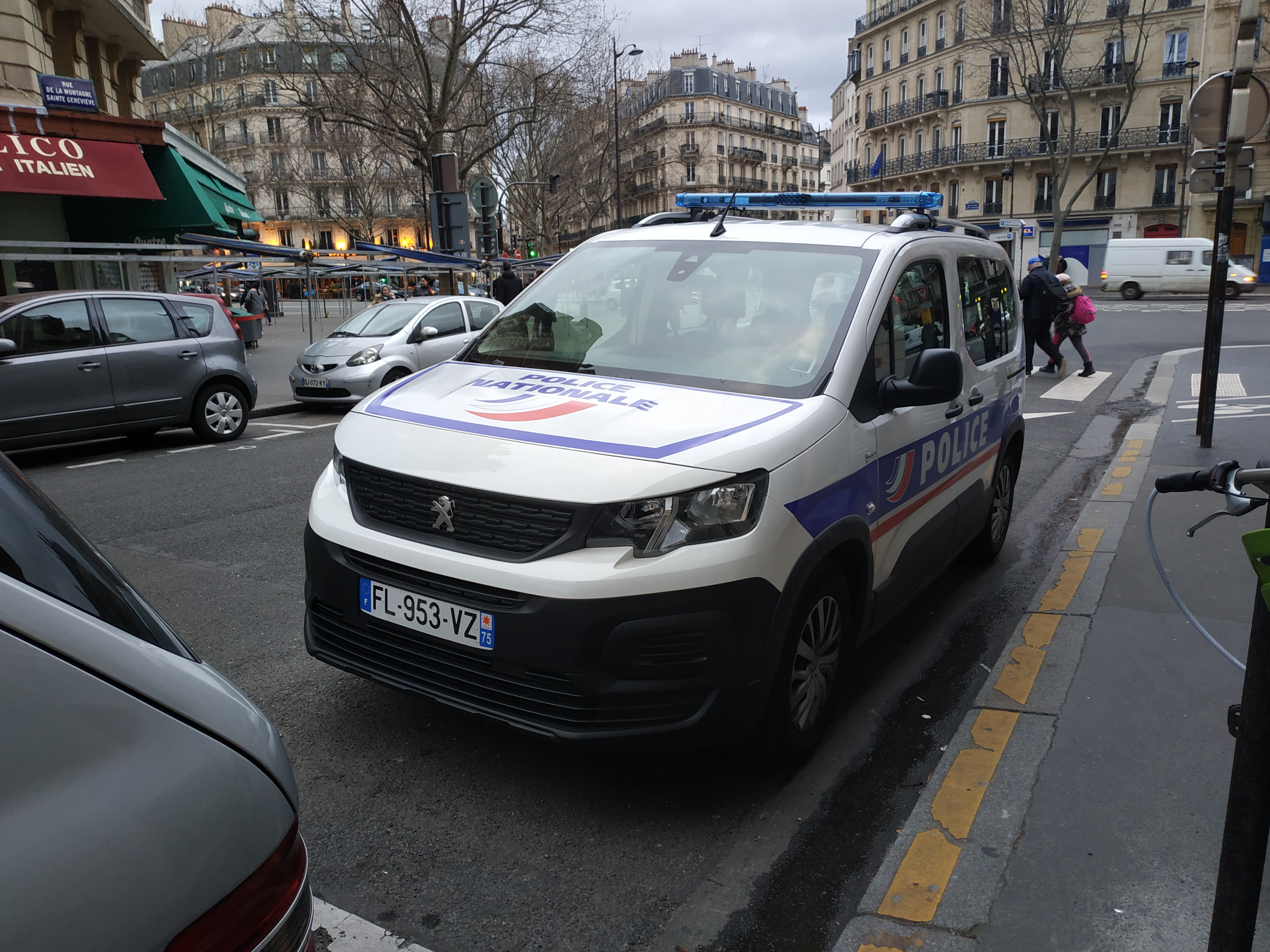
Peugeot Rifter

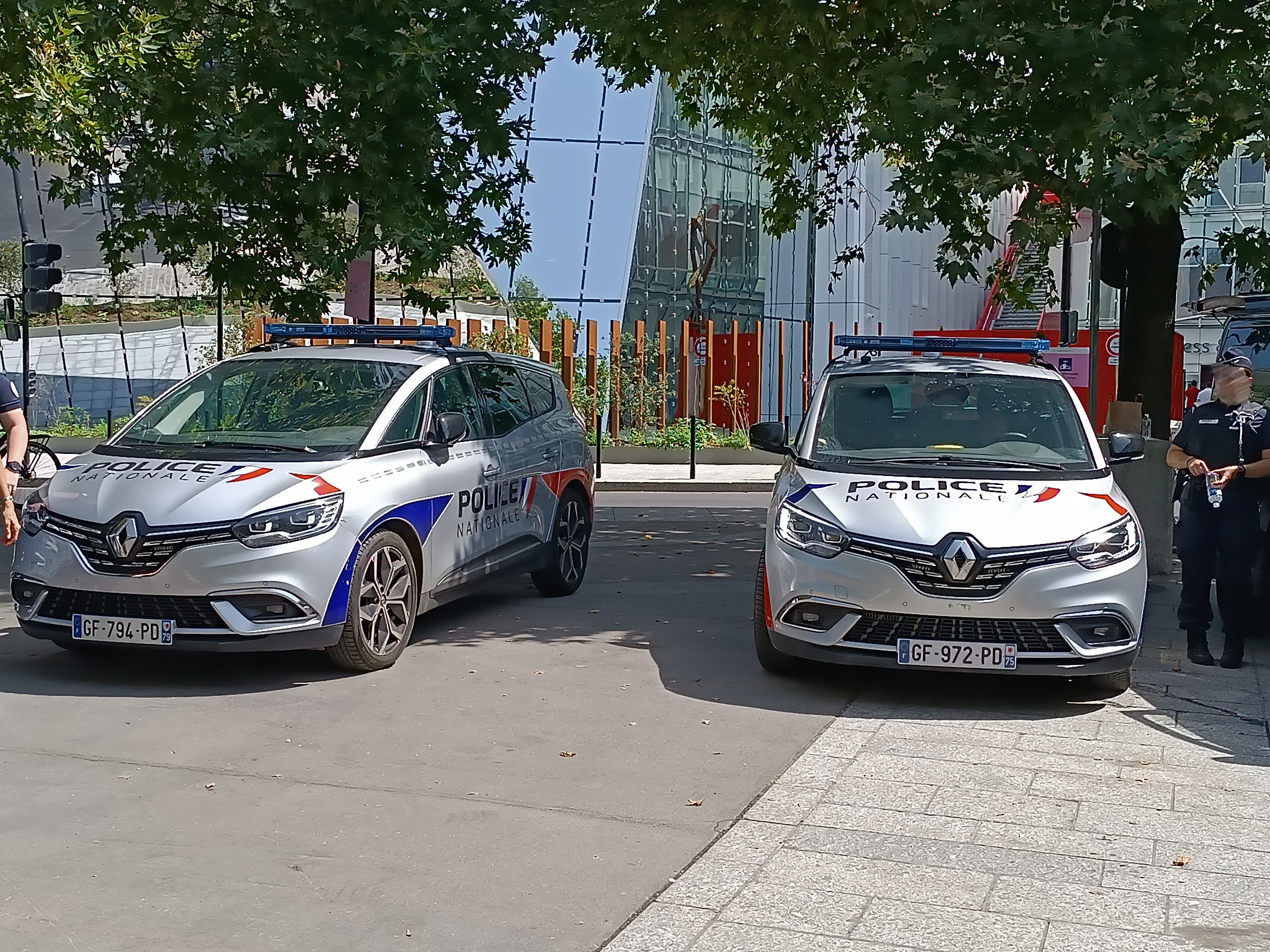
Renault Scénic IV

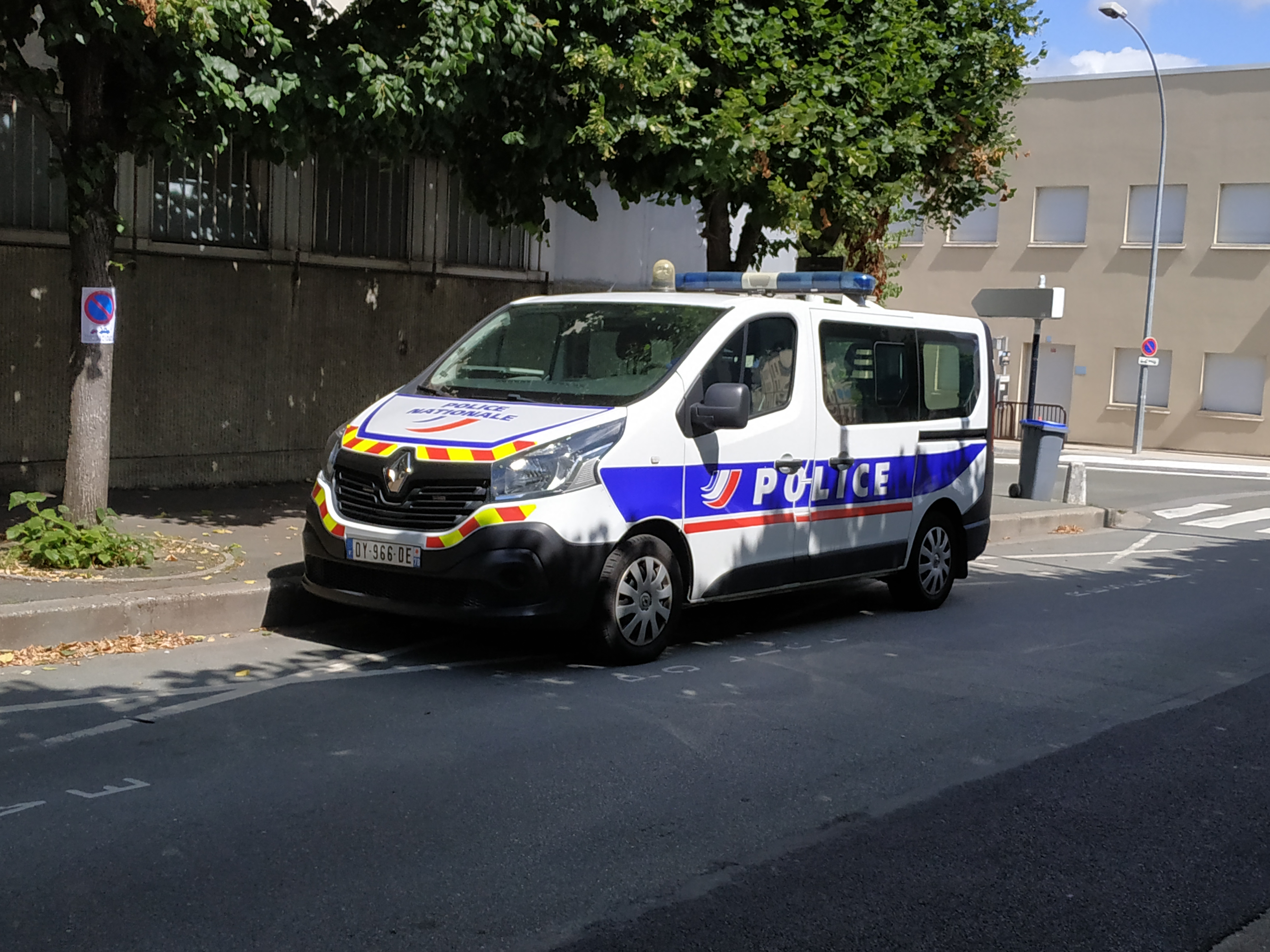
Renault Trafic III

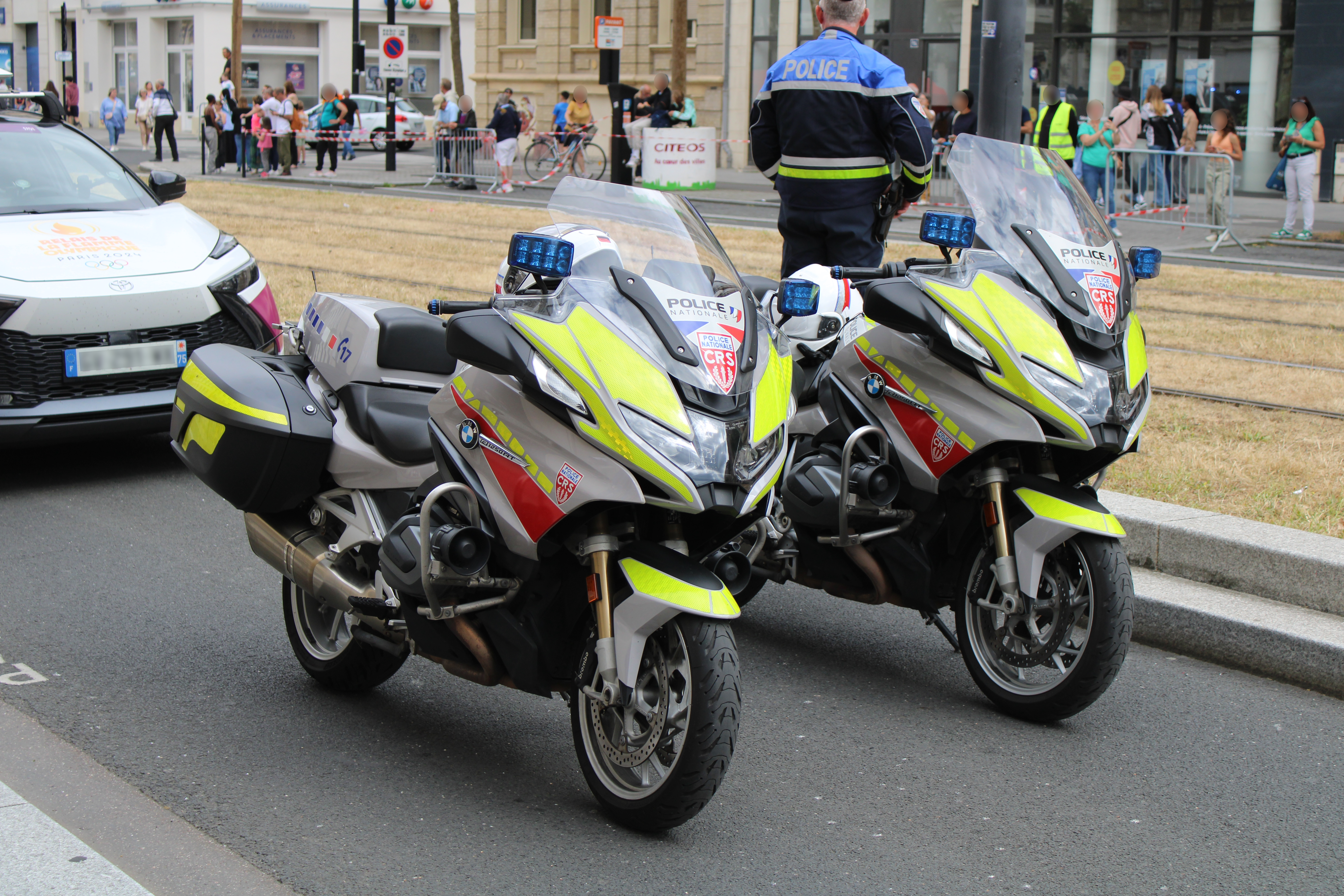
Police Motorcycle BMW R 1200 RT

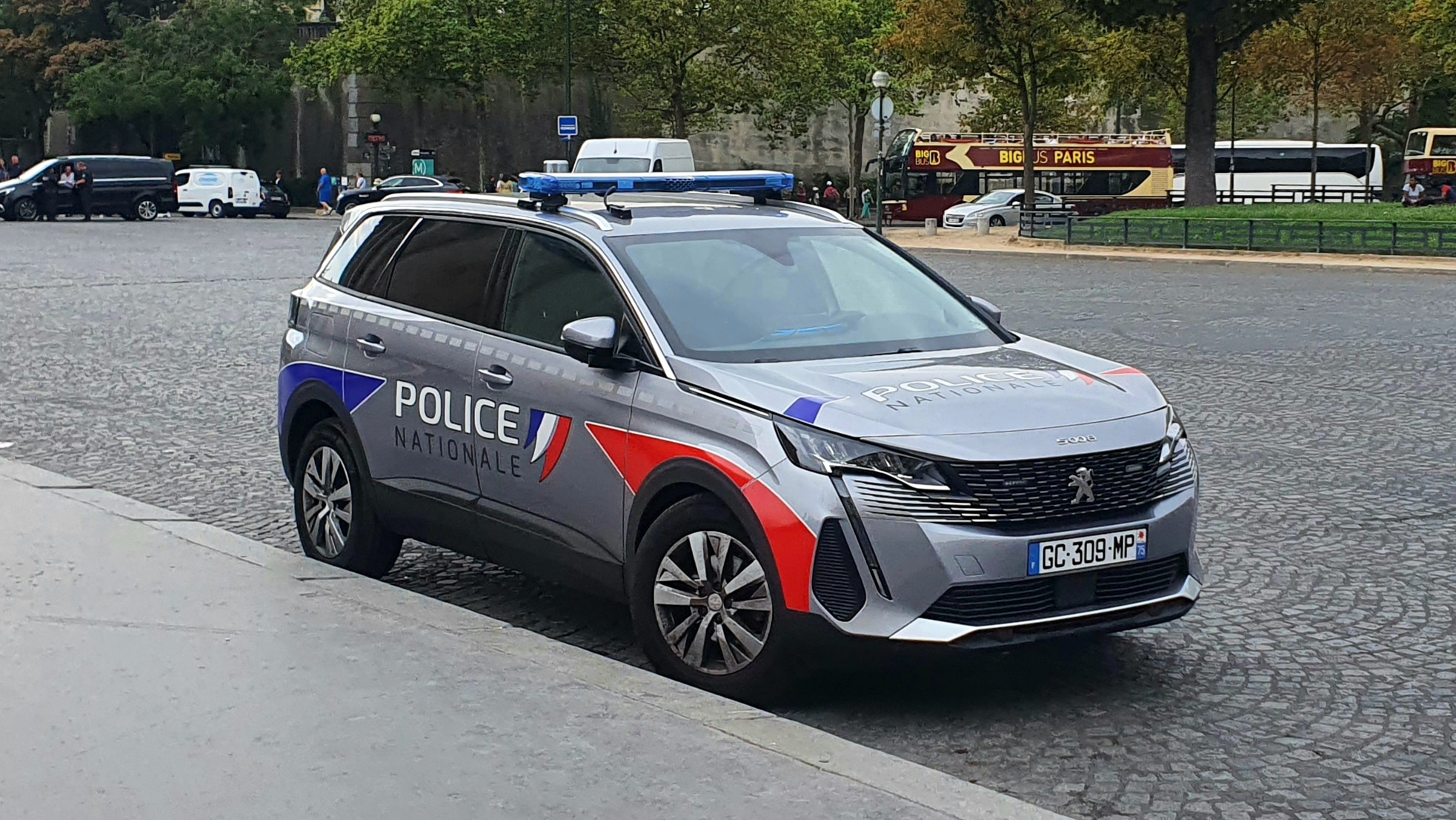
Peugeot 5008 II

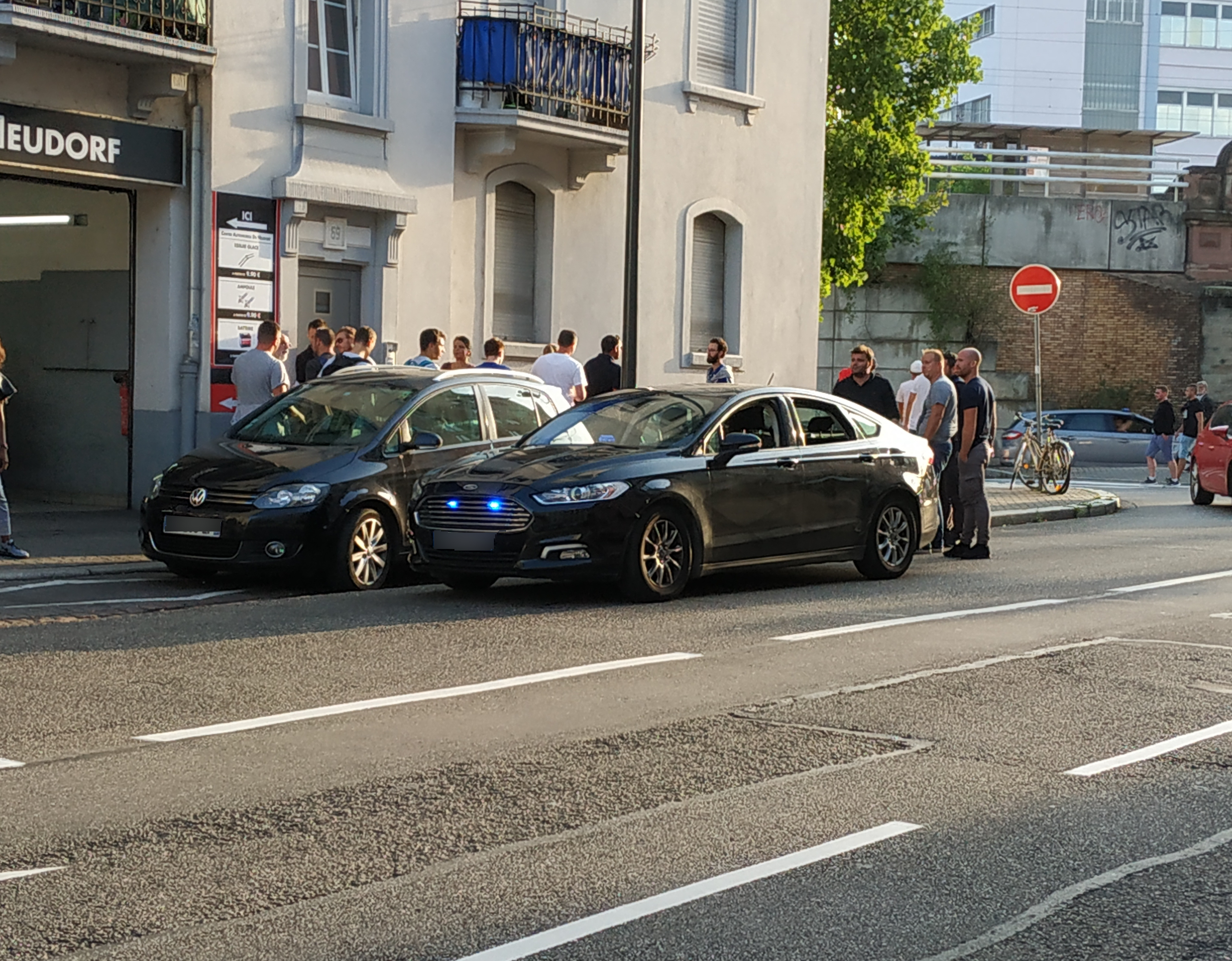
Unmarked anti crime unit (Ford Mondeo)

== Gallery ==
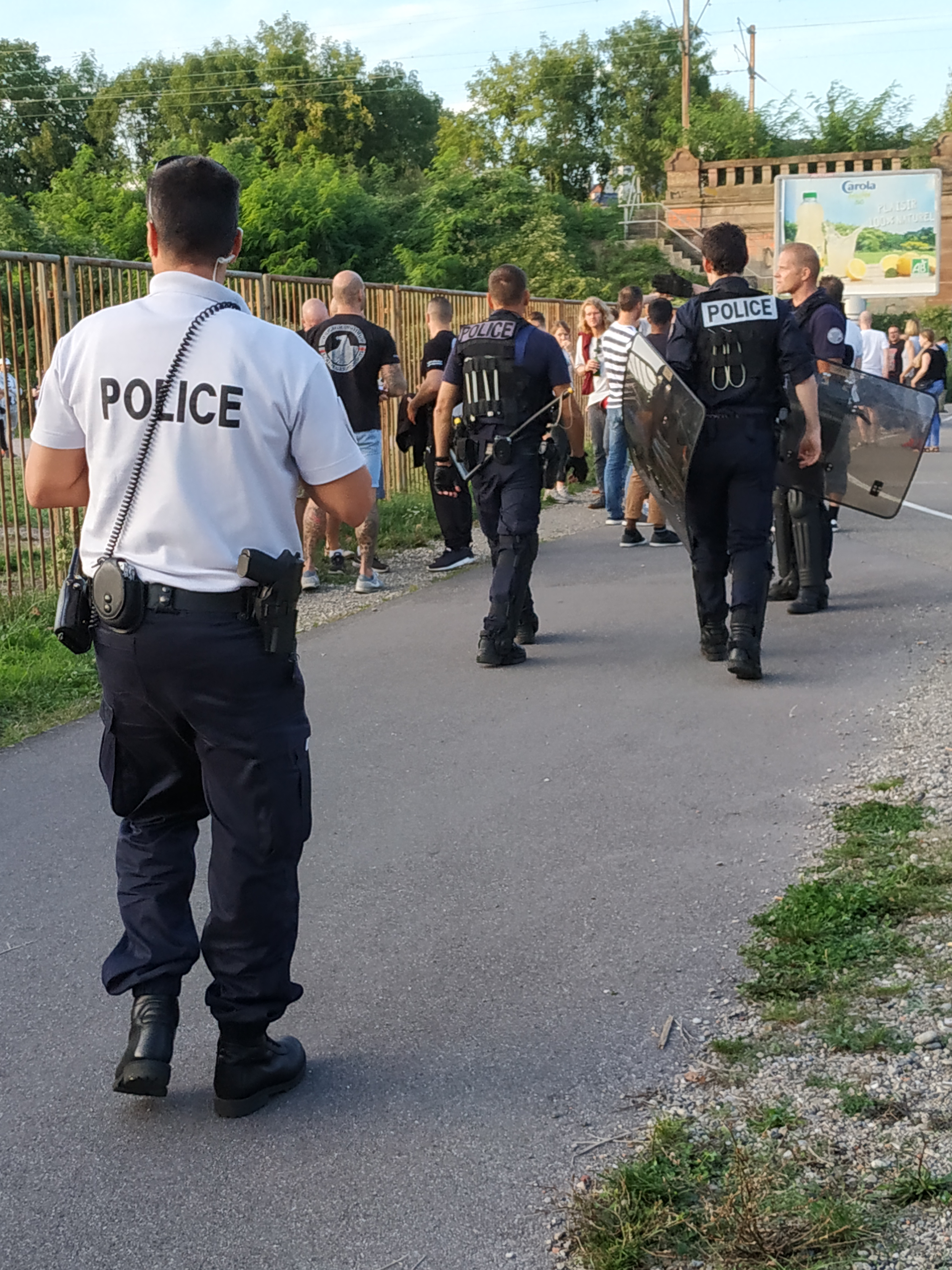
Police securing a RC Strasbourg Alsace football match (2019)

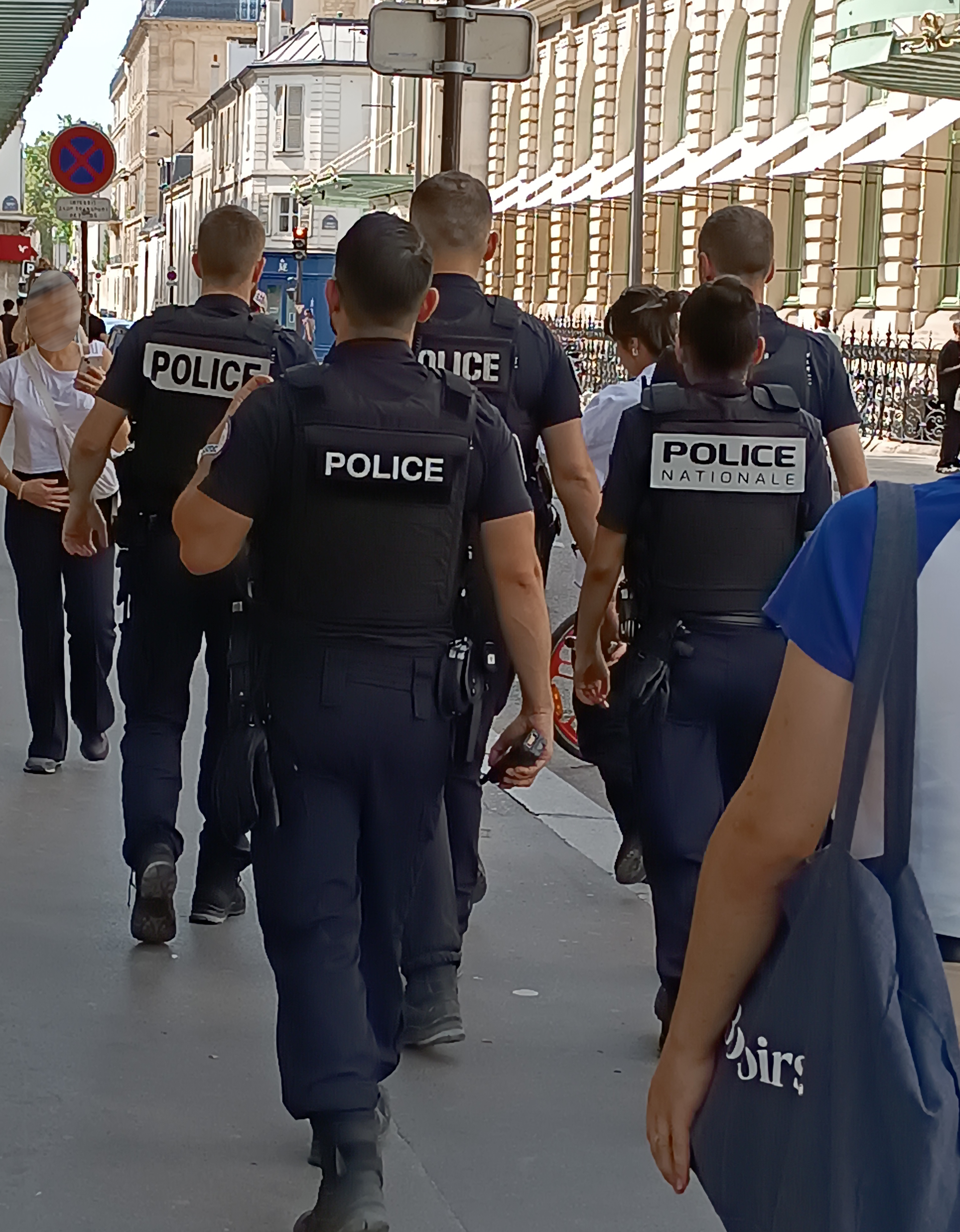
Police officers securing Paris 2024 Olympics

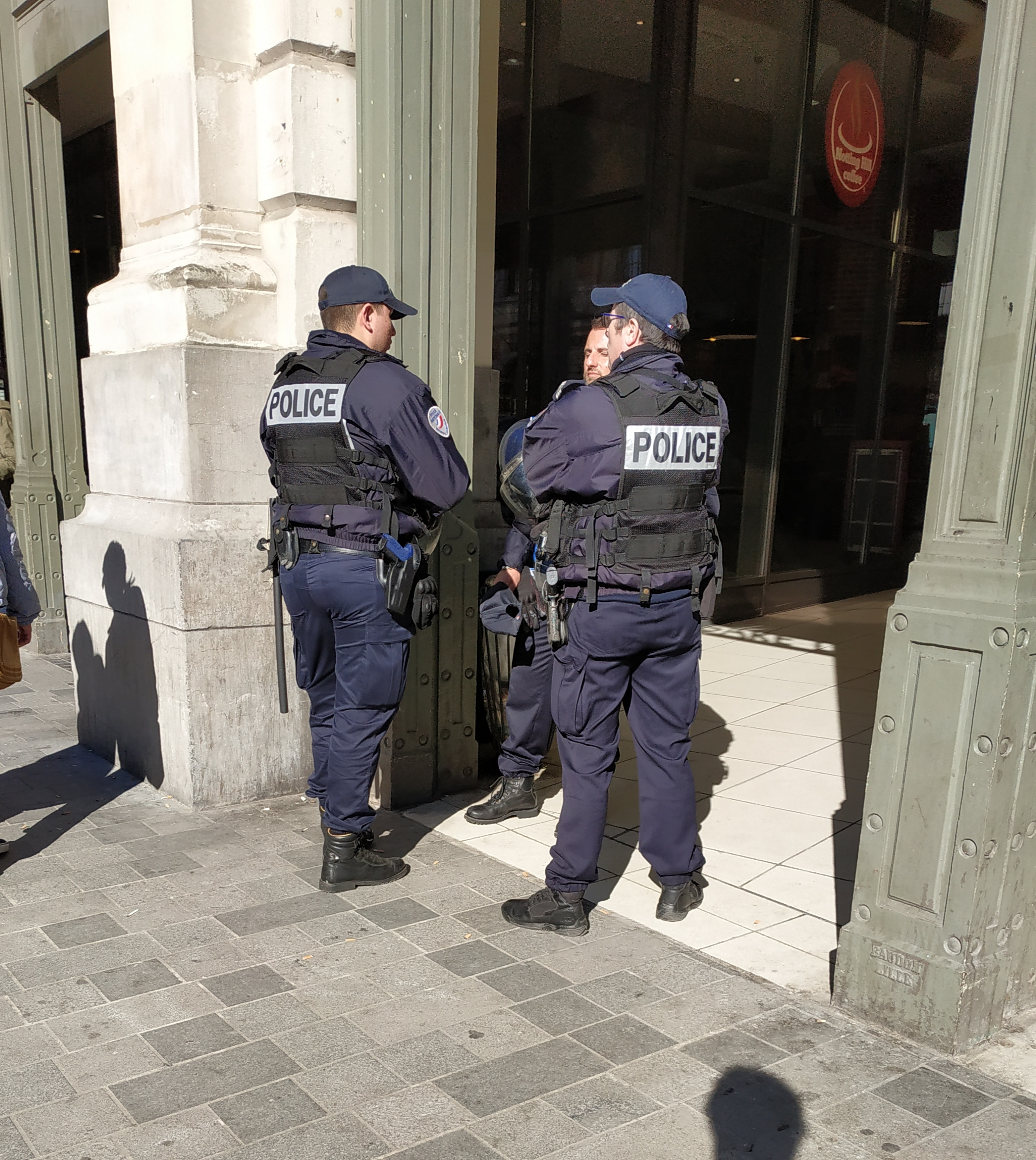
Police officers on duty at Lille-Flandres station (2019)

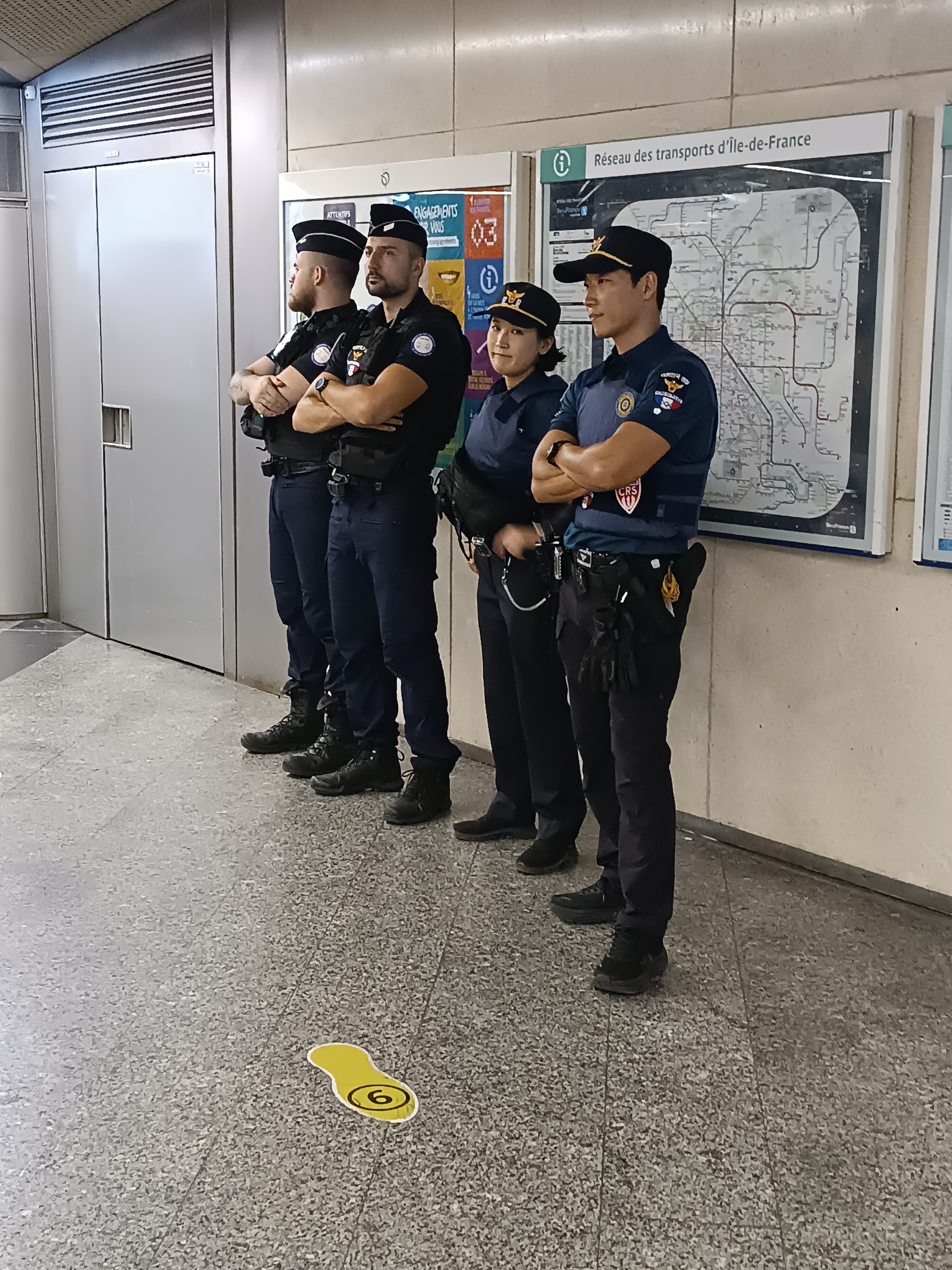
French and Korean police officers for Paris 2024 Olympics

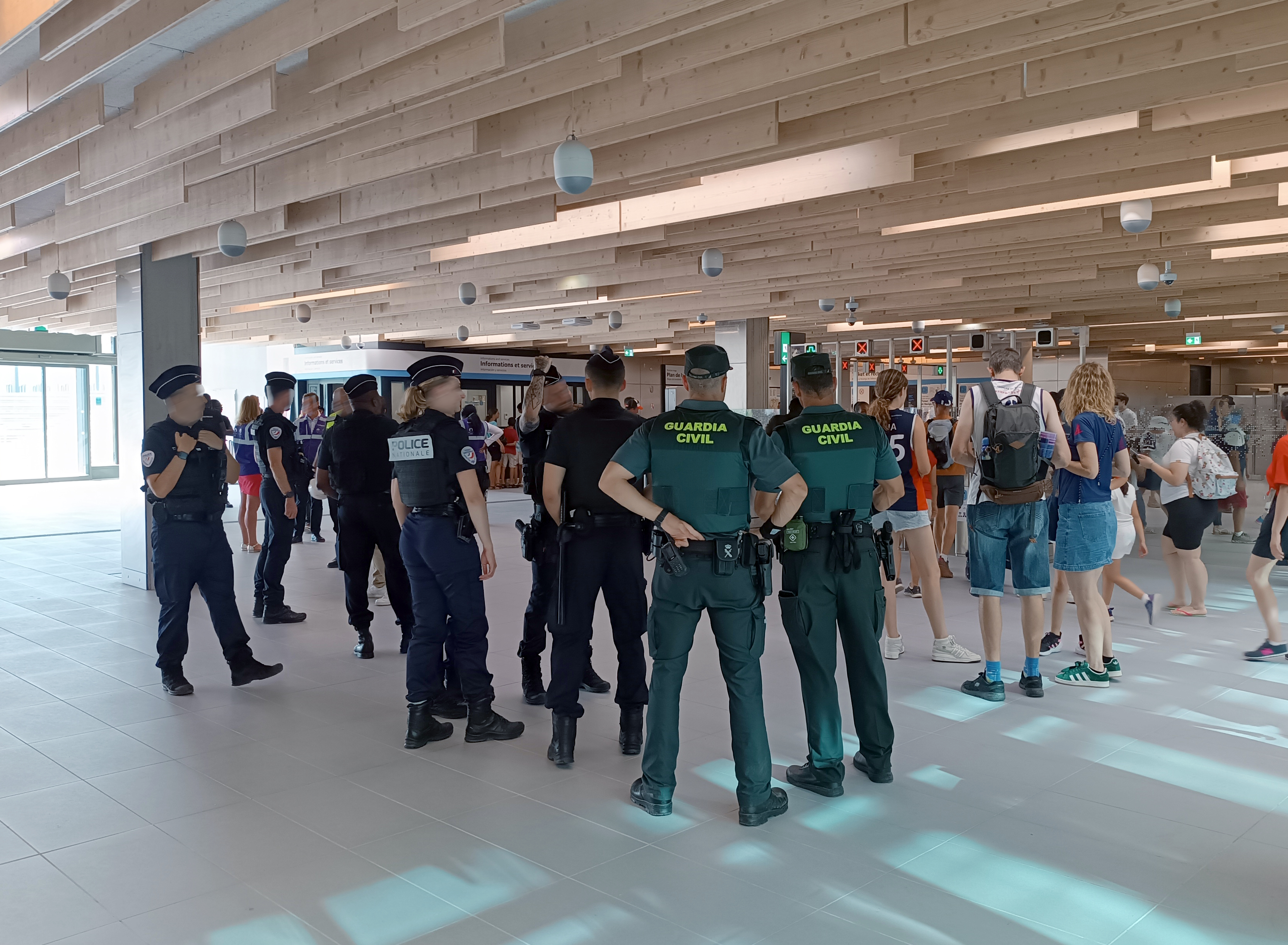
French policemen and Guardia Civil officers for Paris 2024 Olympics

== Injured and killed ==
=== In the line of duty ===
According to data from the Ministry of the Interior released in 2021, the number of police officers killed in the line of duty has significantly decreased since the 1980s. Indeed, 36 police officers died while on duty in the 2010s, compared with 88 in the 1980s.

=== Deaths caused by the French National Police ===
In France, the Inspectorate General of the National Police has recorded individuals killed or injured during police operations since 2018.

The collective "Désarmons-les" maintains a list of people killed by law enforcement since 2012. They record 437 deaths. Most of the victims are racialized, particularly Black and Arab, which some analysts perceive as institutionalized racism. The number of deaths is increasing, with 2024 being a particularly deadly year. This phenomenon is exacerbated by police impunity.

== In popular culture ==
=== Film ===
- Inspector Clouseau
- The Day of the Jackal

=== Television series ===
- Maigret (various television series)
- The Last Five Minutes (Les cinq dernières minutes) (1958–1996)
- Navarro (1989–2005)
- Commissaire Moulin (1976–2006)
- Police Judiciaire/P.J. (1997–2009)
- La Crim' (1999–2006)
- Commissaire Magellan (2009–)
- Les Cordier juge et flic (1992–2003)
- Commissaire Cordier (2004–2007)
- Julie Lescaut (1991–2014)
- Falco (2013–2016)
- Commissaire Valence (2002–2008)
- Engrenages (2005-)
- Profilage (2009-2020)
- The Crimson Rivers (Les Rivières Pourpres) (2018-2020)
- HPI (TV series) (2021-)

== See also ==
- Law enforcement in France
