= Prefecture of Police =

Geographic command of the French National Police

- Préfecture de police

Agency overview
- Formed: 1800 (Paris), 2012 (Bouches-du-Rhône)
- Jurisdiction: Ministry of the Interior
- Headquarters: Paris and Marseille
- Agency executive: Prefect of Police
- Parent department: National Police
- Website: Official site

In France, a Prefecture of Police (French: Préfecture de police), headed by the Prefect of Police (Préfet de police), is an agency of the Government of France under the administration of the Ministry of the Interior. Part of the National Police, it provides a police force for an area limited by department borders. As of 2012, two such prefectures exist:

- The Paris Police Prefecture, created in 1800
- The Bouches-du-Rhône Police Prefecture, created in 2012

== See also ==
- Prefectures in France
