= Bouches-du-Rhône Delegated Police Prefecture =

Bouches-du-Rhône Police Prefecture Préfecture de police des Bouches-du-Rhône

Agency overview
- Formed: 16 October 2012

Jurisdictional structure
- Operations jurisdiction: Bouches-du-Rhône, France
- Area: 5,087 km^{2} (1,964 sq mi)
- Population: 2,034,357 (2018)
- Constituting instrument: Décret n° 2012-1151 du 15 octobre 2012 relatif à l'organisation et à l'action des services de l'État dans le département des Bouches-du-Rhône

Operational structure
- Headquarters: Marseille
- Agency executive: Frédérique Camilleri, Prefect of Police of Bouches-du-Rhône
- Parent agency: National Police

Website
- www.bouches-du-rhone.gouv.fr

The Bouches-du-Rhône Delegated Police Prefecture (French: Préfecture de police déléguée des Bouches-du-Rhône), headed by the Bouches-du-Rhône Delegated Police Prefect (French: Préfète de police déléguée des Bouches-du-Rhône), is a Prefecture of Police part of the National Police, which is a police force in the department of Bouches-du-Rhône. It was created on 16 October 2012.

== History ==
A delegated prefect for police was instituted in Bouches-du-Rhône in 1972 at the same time as in other French departments. In 1989, the office was renamed Deputy Prefect for Security, then in 1993, Deputy Prefect for Security and Defence. Although commonly referred to as "the police prefect", these prefects actually assisted the prefect of the larger security and defence zones, ex officio the regional prefect of the zone's headquarters, in leading and coordinating the action of the police services in the department.

Following numerous cases involving drug traffickers in the Marseille urban area, the Government of France announced the creation of a full-service police prefect for Bouches-du-Rhône on 8 September 2012. A decree to this effect, which was presented to the Council of Ministers on 10 October 2012, was adopted on 15 October 2012.

== Organic structure ==
Together with the Paris Police Prefect, this is the only full-service police prefect in France; however, unlike Paris, the department of Bouches-du-Rhône remains organically attached to the National Police. Thus, whilst the Paris Police Prefecture has its own administration and specific competences (aliens, driving licenses, noise pollution, defence and security amongst others), this is not the case with the Bouches-du-Rhône Police Prefect who has only functional authority over the National Police and Gendarmerie services, as well as over the services of the prefecture of Bouches-du-Rhône for the execution of the powers which are entrusted by law.

== Mission ==
The mission of the Bouches-du-Rhône Police Prefecture comprises the following four tasks:

1. Implementation of the national internal security policy
2. Responsibility for public order
3. Authority over and coordination of the police forces and gendarmerie units
4. Administrative police decisions contributing to internal security in matters of drinking establishments, demonstrations on the public highway, video surveillance, weapons, private security and security of sporting events

== List of police prefects and delegated police prefects ==
=== List of police prefects ===
- Jean-Paul Bonnetain, 2012 – 2015
- Laurent Nuñez, 2015 – 2017
- Olivier de Mazières, 2017 – 2020
- Emmanuel Barbe, 2020
- Frédérique Camilleri, 2020 – 2024
- Pierre-Édouard Colliex, 2024 – 2025

=== List of delegated police prefects ===
- Corinne Simon, 2025 – present
