= Redemption Song (TV series) =

American reality television show

- Created by: Richard Drew
- Starring: Chris Jericho, 11 contestants
- Country of origin: United States
- No. of episodes: 8

Production
- Running time: 44 minutes

Original release
- Network: Fuse TV
- Release: August 29 – December 19, 2008

Redemption Song is an American reality television show that aired on Fuse TV. The show, hosted by Chris Jericho, was a competition among eleven women for a recording contract with Geffen Records. The series ran from October 29, 2008 to December 19, 2008. The first episode was posted online on the Fuse website and on various cable on-demand services one week before the premiere. The winner was Alecia "Mixi" Demner.

== Background ==
The series was based on 11 women whose goals were to become musicians. Becoming a part of the show, they have another chance to win the opportunity of receiving a legitimate music recording contract. The women competed against each other for the right to advance in the competition and ultimately be the winner. Mauli B, who is a vocal coach, helped the contestants become better at singing. The 11 contestants for the reality show were Angelica, Elisa, Esther, Farah, Jazmin, Joie, Kededra, Kendra, Mixi, Nyia, and Toni. The last names of the contestants were later released to the public. The winner would receive a contract to work with Geffen Records, a record label owned by Universal Music Group.

The host of the show was Chris Jericho who is also a professional wrestler best known for his time in World Wrestling Entertainment and the lead singer of rock band Fozzy. ZigZag Production partnered up with Fuse Network to create the production of the series. According to AfterEllen, Joie is a bisexual and Nyia is a lesbian.

== Contestants ==
=== In order of elimination ===
(ages stated are at time of contest)

- Toni Espacido, 25, from Phoenix, Arizona
- Nyia Webb, 29, from Las Vegas, Nevada
- Elisa Jordana, 23, from Old Bridge, New Jersey
- Kendra Morris, 27, from St. Petersburg, Florida
- Kededra Michelle Holmes, 23, from Coatesville, Pennsylvania
- Esther Kanada, 30, from Somerville, New Jersey
- Joie Giordano, 22, from Queens, New York
- Farah Belazario, 26, from Queens, New York
- Jazmin Conte, 21, from Toms River, New Jersey
- Angelica Chitwood, 21, from Plymouth, Minnesota (Runner-Up)
- Alecia "Mixi" Demner, 25, from Orlando, Florida (Winner)

== Elimination chart ==
From the Top 11 to the present week, the bottom three was announced with the winner of that week's challenge being given the power to save a contestant from the bottom three. Chris then reveals which of the two left standing are going home by stating that they have been "dropped from the label" and snapping the record in their sleeve in half. The exception to this was Top 10 week, in which the person going home (Nyia) wasn't in the bottom three. She chose to quit the show and snapped her own album in two, thus giving a bottom four for that week. In the Top 8 week, Kendra did the same thing and eliminated herself as well. As of the week of Top 6, the bottom three announcement is not in effect. The week of Top 3 was the finale, and Mixi was the one declared the winner. After the season finale episode, Mixi's new music video, "I Miss Those Days (Ghost)", were shown during rolling credits, and it became available one day before the airing of the finale on iTunes. The reunion episode of the cast members of the show, also hosted by Jericho, originally aired on December 19, 2008.

	Episodes								
Order	1	2	3	4	5	6	7	8	
Mixi	IN	IN	IN	IN	WIN	IN	LOW	IN	WINNER
Angelica	IN	WIN	WIN	IN	LOW	IN	WIN	IN	RUNNER-UP
Jazmin	WIN	LOW	IN	IN	LOW	WIN	IN	OUT	
Farah	IN	IN	LOW	IN	LOW	IN	OUT		
Joie	IN	IN	IN	WIN	IN	OUT			
Esther	IN	LOW	IN	LOW	OUT				
Kededra	IN	IN	LOW	OUT					
Kendra	LOW	LOW	IN	OUT					
Elisa	LOW	IN	OUT						
Nyia	IN	OUT							
Toni	OUT								

Green indicates the contestant was the winner of Redemption Song.
Yellow indicates the contestant was the runner-up of Redemption Song.
Blue indicates the contestant won the elimination challenge.
Pink indicates the contestant who was in the bottom 3 but was saved by the challenge winner from elimination.
Orange indicates the contestant who was in the bottom 2 and was not eliminated.
Purple indicates the contestant quit the competition.
Tomato indicates the contestant was eliminated from the competition.

Top 11: Jazmin won the challenge and thus the only contestant safe. Kendra, Elisa and Toni were the bottom three. Since Jazmin won the challenge, she had the choice of choosing one of the bottom three to be safe from elimination. She chose Kendra, leaving Elisa and Toni up for elimination. The judges decided to send Toni home. Many of the women, including Elisa, expressed disapproval of this decision and thought Elisa was the one being eliminated.

Top 10: Angelica won the challenge, and the bottom three was Kendra (making her second consecutive appearance), Jazmin, and Esther. At elimination, Jazmin called Angelica out on various topics, such as what Angelica said earlier regarding some of the previous contestants. Despite this, Angelica saved Jazmin. As Chris was going to announce which of the bottom two would go home, Nyia, who had been upset throughout the competition from being away from her kids, dropped out. Chris revealed that Kendra would've been the one going home. During the challenge, former NSYNC member Chris Kirkpatrick served as a member of the judging panel.

Top 9: Angelica won her second consecutive challenge and chose to save Kededra, whom everyone agreed finally showed a sense of vulnerability. Unlike the past two eliminations, there was minimal drama at this elimination challenge, with Elisa graciously leaving the show. Joe Slaughter made a special appearance as a choreographer. Former WWE Divas Mickie James, Maryse, Eve Torres and Candice Michelle also made special appearances.

Top 8: Joie won the main challenge, making Angelica upset about not winning the challenge for the third consecutive time. Kendra (making her third appearance in four weeks), Kededra (making her second consecutive appearance), and Esther (making her second appearance) were the bottom three. Jericho announced that there would be two eliminations. Before Joie would choose whom to save from elimination, Kendra claimed that the judges from throughout the competition hated her image and dropped herself from the contest, despite her and Mixi winning a challenge earlier in the competition. Jericho said that "it pissed him off". Joie decides to save Esther, thus eliminating Kededra. Mýa served as a replacement host for partial of the episode.

Top 6: The main challenge was to see which individual out of a group that's been assigned to two groups, each with three members, stood out the most. Mixi and Joie were the ones who did well the most, though it was Mixi who won the whole challenge, thus saving herself from elimination. However, Joie would be safe from elimination as well. As of this time, all remaining contestants are up for elimination without being saved by the winner. Out of the four up for elimination, Esther was eliminated.

Top 5: The girls were interviewed by the record company to see who are most likely to be the winner of the competition, in which Jazmin won. The main challenge was to perform in front of a group of people in style of rapping. Jazmin once again won the challenge, making her the first contestant to win both challenges in a single episode. Because she won the challenge, she was not up for the elimination. The four remaining contestants were up for elimination, and Jericho announced that it was Joie who was going home, leaving the rest of the girls in tears. Kardinal Offishall made a special appearance coaching the girls how to rap.

Top 4: The main challenge was to perform "Roxanne" by The Police, but the girls had to perform the song in different genres. Jazmin had to perform the song in salsa music, Angelica in reggae version, Farah in punk rock version, and Mixi in country music. In elimination, the girls would be safe from being eliminated if they were selected to be in first place, second, and third place overall of how well they did by the judges. Angelica came in first, Jazmin in second, and Mixi in third. Farah was the one dropped from the label.

Finale: The three girls had to perform an A cappella of Unwritten by Natasha Bedingfield, in front the former contestants of the show, and the twist was that one of the girls would be dropped. Afterwards, the girls were told that they needed to revisit their troubled past. They packed up and headed out to their homes. During their visits, they all received an envelope, which contained their vinyl records. Jazmin's record was broken into pieces when she opened it, meaning she's been dropped from the label. The final two, Angelica and Mixi, performed in front of Geffen Records staff on stage. Afterwards, the manager of the record label announced that Mixi was the winner.
