= Laurent Ruquier =

French television and radio host (born 1963)

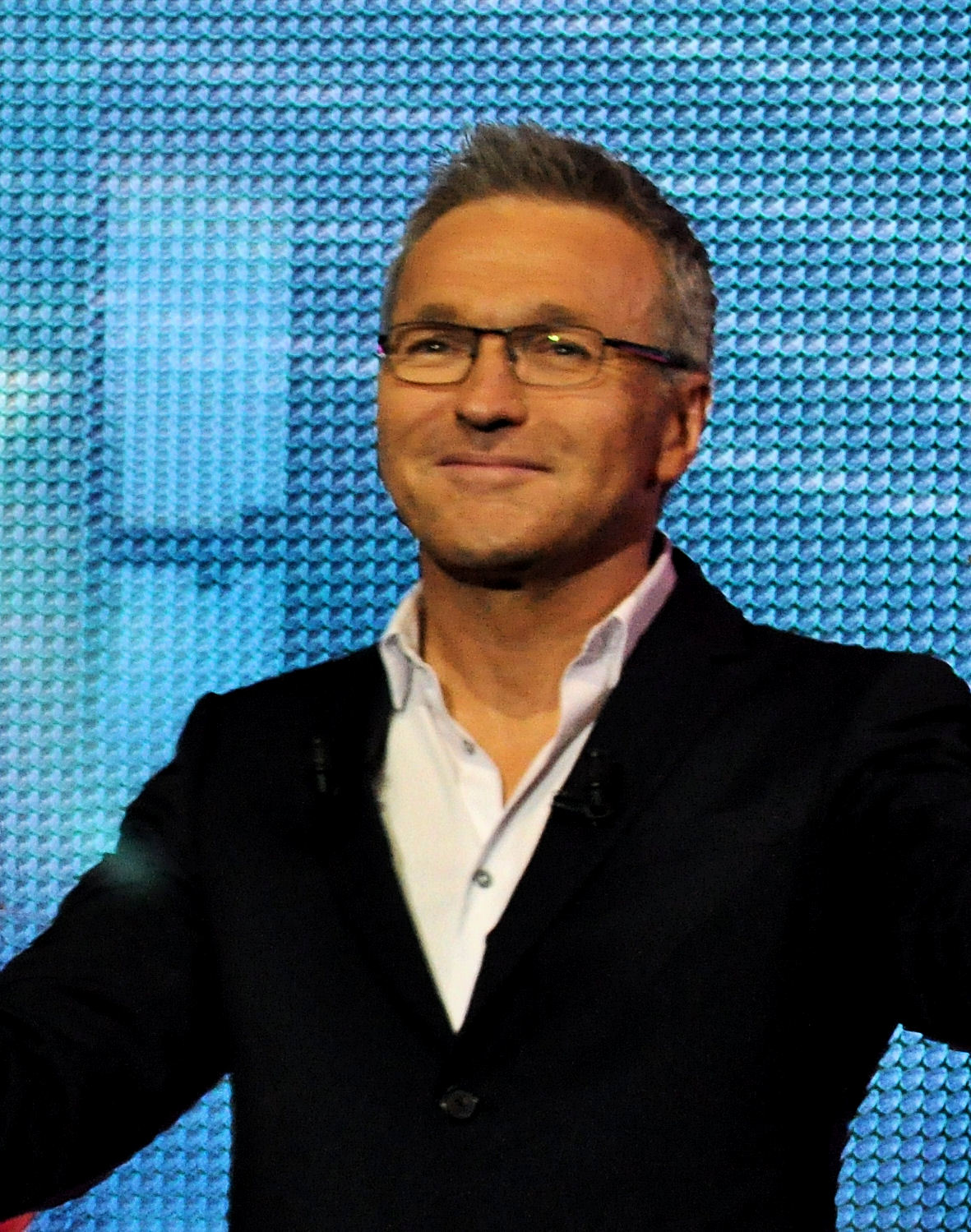
- Laurent Ruquier at the Casino de Paris in 2013
- Born: 24 February 1963 (age 63); Le Havre, France
- Occupations: Journalist, satirical comedian, columnist, radio host, television presenter, lyricist, author, screenwriter, impresario, theatre owner
- Partner(s): Benoît Petitjean (separated), Hugo Manos

Laurent Hugues Emmanuel Ruquier (French pronunciation: [loʁɑ̃ yɡ emanɥɛl ʁykje]; born 24 February 1963) is a French television presenter, radio host and comedian. He is also a lyricist, writer, columnist and impresario; he has been co-owner and general manager of Théâtre Antoine-Simone Berriau in Paris since 2011. He is best known for hosting the talk show On n'est pas couché on France 2 every Saturday evening from 2006 to 2020.

== Early years ==
Ruquier grew up in a large family of modest means, the second of five siblings. His father, Roger Ruquier, now deceased, was a boilermaker at construction sites in Le Havre and his mother, Raymonde Ruquier (1924-September 2015), was a housewife.

In high school, Laurent entertained his friends by publishing his first satires in the school newspaper. At first he studied accounting - he obtained a DEUG in Economic and Social Administration (AES) at the Le Havre site of the University of Rouen and a Diploma from the Institute of Technology (DUT) in Business Management and Training administration (GEA).

He also attended a course in Constitutional Law given by Patrice Gélard. Upon the advice of the latter, he finally turned to humour. In 1986, he did 21 months of military service as a conscientious objector at the Regional Directorate of Cultural Affairs.

His mentor was Pierre Doris, whose black humour he was particularly fond of.

== Career ==
=== Debut on radio and television (1983-1990) ===
Between 1983 and 1986, he made his debut on the local radio stations in Le Havre: Radio Force 7, Ocean Gate Radio, and Radio FMR in Rouen. At first, he mainly presented the show "The Little Heads", using the concept of the show "The Big Heads" on RTL with local comedians and other entertainers from the station.

In 1987, encouraged by his aunt, he contacted the radio presenter and journalist Jacques Mailhot, then host of Ear in the Area broadcast on France Inter, who was captivated by his texts. Thanks to Mailhot, Laurent Ruquier had his first experience of television on the show "Paris Kiosk" that Jacques Mailhot presented for three months on FR3 Île-de-France, and he was offered the opportunity to perform in Paris in a scene of the show "Vault of the Republic", a golden opportunity for the humourist to make himself known beyond the limits of his native region.

Soon after, in 1988, and for two years he wrote irreverent stories for Jean Amadou and Maryse, as part of their daily morning show on Europe 1.

In 1989, he proposed his candidacy to Jacques Martin who had put forward an idea for a program in the style of the "Newshound", a satirical news show that ran from 1975 to 1976 on TF1. Jacques Martin accepted and took him on as a writer on "So do, do, do ..." which was released in 1989 on France 2.

In 1990, he was hired by France Inter to collaborate on the "True-False Journal" show presented by Claude Villers.

=== Radio host ===
==== France Inter (1991–1997) ====
In 1991, Laurent Ruquier became host of the summer radio show Close the window for mosquitoes. This appeared to be a conclusive test because the program was repeated at the start of September with the same format but called Nothing Polished. This ran successfully on France Inter and featured young comedians such as Pascal Brunner, Anne Roumanoff, Chraz, Sophie Forte, Virginie Lemoine, Jean-Jacques Vanier, Patrick Font, Didier Porte, Laurence Boccolini, Christophe Alévêque, Frédéric Lebon, Patrick Adler and Laurent Gerra.

In 1996, he founded his own production company RUQ Productions and hosted the show Nothing Polished on France Inter. When it ended, Laurent Ruquier took on Change Management. In 1997, he hosted the show In Every Sense on France Inter.

==== Europe 1 (1999–present) ====
In 1999, Laurent Ruquier appeared on Europe 1 with two daily programmes: a morning chronicle with Julie Leclerc and Get in the way (On va s'gener) which he directed daily from 4:30 p.m. to 6 p.m., changing to 4 p.m. from 2006, then 4 p.m. to 6:30 p.m. from 2009 and 3:30 p.m. to 6 p.m. from September 2010.

He commented on the news with a group of commentators including, Gérard Miller, Isabel Alonso, Pierre Bénichou, Claude Sarraute, Fabrice Eboué, Christophe Alévêque, Steevy Boulay, Jérémy Michalak, Jean-Luc Lemoine, François Renucci, Olivier de Kersauson, Christine Bravo, Patrice Leconte, Jean-Marie Bigard, Titoff, Motrot Isabelle, Monique Pantel for the cinema section, Serge Llado for the "Eternal Music" section, as well as Paul Wermus for the enquiry section. The following also made appearances: Arno Klarsfeld, Valérie Payet, Bernard Rapp, Jacques Martin, Jean Yanne, Philippe Bouvard himself between his dismissal and reinstatement at RTL, Pierre Palmade among others.

On 4 May 2007, Jean-Marc Morandini announced on his blog that Laurent Ruquier would stop his daily broadcast on Europe 1 at the end of the 2006–2007 season 2006. The host was to "take a break" in his radio activities to focus on television: he was hosting a daily radio show and a weekly show on France 2. Laurent Ruquier also wanted to spend more time in theatre and in writing. Jean-Pierre Elkabbach, President of Europe 1, reacted by saying: "I regret the personal decision of Laurent Ruquier. I understand that his many activities have given him the desire to dominate his field. I wish to thank Laurent for his eight years of successful collaboration with Europe 1."

According to the blog of Jean-Marc Morandini, Laurent Ruquier was going to join RTL at the beginning of September 2007 to host a weekly show every weekend. The presenter was also in contact with Europe 1, France Inter, and RMC.

Laurent Ruquier went finally to Europe 1: he announced to Axel Duroux, that the President of RTL would allow him to retain his slot from 4 pm – 6 pm on Europe 1, after discussions with Jean-Pierre Elkabbach, the president of the station. The latter expressed his satisfaction: "I am above all happy for Europe 1 and for the Group. For me, Laurent can not be elsewhere. He lives in Rue François 1^{er}. ! This is a child of Europe 1."

In September 2010, as he had now returned to his daily show on France 2, Get in the Way now started at 3:30 pm and finished at 6 pm.

At the start of 2011, Laurent Ruquier retained his program Get in the Way. In addition to this daily program, he joined the station's morning show, replacing Guy Carlier, to broadcast a humour section at 7:55 am and calling himself the "Clipboard". This novelty in the program schedule reflected the fact that the presenter must be present during the presidential year, according to the agreement with the President of the station, Denis Olivennes. So he returned to the station's morning show as it was a few years ago. In early December 2011 his schedule was overloaded, the host was tired and decided to leave Europe 1 Morning.

On 25 April 2012, Laurent Ruquier announced in an interview in Paris that he had re-enlisted for (at least) two years in Europe 1. As for each year, some minor changes are in preparation for the show.

In September 2013, Get in the Way now started at 4 p.m. and finished at 6:30 p.m.

In September 2014, Laurent Ruquier replaced Philippe Bouvard on RTL's radio program Les Grosses Têtes.

==== Programmes on France 2, TF1 and Canal+ (1994–2000) ====
His first experience as a television host was catastrophic. The television adaptation of Nothing Polished in 1994 on France 2 did not attract viewers and Les Niouzes in 1995 on TF1 survived only five days. These programmes included Mergault Isabelle, Isabelle Motrot, Frédéric Lebon, Jacques Ramade and Christophe Alévêque alongside Ruquier.

In 1998, he attempted a return to television with the show Tout le monde en parle, produced and co-hosted with Thierry Ardisson. This time, the public was won over, but Laurent Ruquier changed his employer next season to rejoin the ranks of Canal+. He co-hosted Un an de plus with Marc-Olivier Fogiel where he brought his sense of humour.

==== Regular broadcasts on France 2 (2000–present) ====
In September 2000, Thierry Ardisson and Catherine Barma proposed that he host On a tout essayé on France 2 in the late evening every second Tuesday.

As a result of the programme's success, in September 2001 France 2 offered him a daily spot between 7 p.m. and 8 p.m. With him, there were his commentator friends from Europe 1, especially: Philippe Geluck, Peri Cochin, Isabelle Alonso, Caroline Diament, Christophe Alévêque, Elsa Fayer, Annie Lemoine, Steevy Boulay, Pierre Bénichou, and Florence Foresti among others.

In 2001, this talk show received a Golden 7 in the Best comedy show category. In 2006, On a tout essayé was given a new look with more intimate tones and less garish colours than before. New writers made their appearance: Jérémy Michalak, Mustapha El Atrassi, Virginia Clausade, Roger Zabel and Mamane.

On 16 September 2006, Laurent Ruquier resumed his Saturday night slot in the late evening, replacing the programme All the World Talking by Thierry Ardisson with a talk show entitled On n'est pas couché, still produced by Catherine Barma and directed by Serge Khalfon. Jonathan Lambert and Jean-Luc Lemoine would do the humour section with The Mediator and The Childhood Friend. Critics Éric Zemmour and at first Michel Polac then Éric Naulleau would do the political and literary sections respectively. In May 2011 Ruquier announced a reshuffle of his team. He decided to replace Zemmour and Naulleau with two women, Natacha Polony and Audrey Pulvar; soon thereafter, Zemmour and Naulleau started their own weekly programme on Paris Première, Zemmour et Naulleau. In addition to this change, Jonathan Lambert decides to stop work with the program. On 28 July 2011, Arnaud Tsamere and Jérémy Ferrari (two comedians from the show On n'demande qu'à en rire) announced on their Facebook account that they will participate in a humour sketch together on the show. Two episodes later, the comedy duo preferred to withdraw to focus on their respective solo careers. They are replaced by Florian Gazan, taking the role of mentalist.

Preferring to remain on France Télévisions who impose an exclusivity clause, in 2006 he left the presentation of the magazine he hosted on Paris Première called Ça balance à Paris leaving his place to Pierre Lescure.

On 21 October 2006, Christine Bravo recovered "her" slot on Saturday primetime for a version of On a tout essayé without Laurent Ruquier who was too busy with all of his other activities: On a tout essayé... sans le patron. During the week from 18 to 22 December 2006, Philippe Geluck replaced Laurent Ruquier, who was absent for personal reasons.

From September 2007 to July 2008, he presented On n'a pas tout dit, a daily talk show which replaced On a tout essayé. He then stopped his daily program to focus on On n'est pas couché.

In December 2009, he resurrected On a tout essayé with a show called On a tout révisé, with that show's crew.

By February 2010, Laurent Ruquier was presenting a monthly television adaptation of his show on Europe 1, Get in the Way (On va s'gêner), broadcast on France 4. In November 2010, France 4 decided to stop broadcasting the show following the wish of France Télévisions to prevent presenters from working on multiple channels in the group. The last episode was broadcast on 1 December 2010.

From 6 September 2010, he presented a new program On n'demande qu'à en rire, from Monday to Friday at 5:55 pm to 6:50 pm on France 2. The program is recorded every Monday and Tuesday at the Moulin Rouge in Paris.

During the program, comedians (solos, duos, trios, etc.) virtually unknown to the general public appear in the episodes. Every sketch is written by the candidate (with or without authors) based on a chosen topic a few days before the recording of the program, among a list of subjects. Since 15 March 2011, comedians (who have made more than 10 appearances) have not chosen the topic, as they are chosen for them by Laurent Ruquier.

At the beginning, the jury was composed of Laurent Ruquier, two guests having cultural knowledge and a member of "Ruquier's Band", the last three jurors changed every day.

As of October 18, 2010, the juror Chantal Goya was eliminated as according to Ruquier, she "did not play the game", Laurent Ruquier decided to replace this "temporary" jury with a "recurrent" jury consisting of himself and three specialists of the world of show business. Now there are: Jean Benguigui, Isabelle Mergault, Catherine Barma, Patrice Leconte, Michèle Bernier, Eric Metayer, Jean-Luc Moreau, Philippe Gildas, and Virginie Lemoine.

The program has been compared to the Petit Théâtre de Bouvard, because it also allowed unknown artists to quickly get a "name". The 100th episode of the show was broadcast on 16 February 2011. During the summer of 2011, the program was broadcast weekly on Saturdays from 7 pm to 8 pm. In April 2012, he announced his intention not to host this program next season: it is now hosted by Jérémy Michalak since September 2012.

==== France 4 ====
In February 2010, he hosted a television adaptation of his monthly radio program. He stopped this program in December 2011.

==== Other programs ====
Laurent Ruquier commented live on France 3 on the Eurovision Song Contest with Isabelle Mergault in 2003, then again with Elsa Fayer in 2004. In 2005, he presented the French preselection for Eurovision with Elsa Fayer but the duo did not comment on the final selection.

On 6 June 2006, Laurent Ruquier presented a variety show, 36 songs in the early evening on France 3. This program was followed by 1967 the sexual revolution in song presented by Michèle Bernier on 13 February 2007 and "The Presidential Elections in Songs" presented by Christophe Hondelatte on 26 March 2007.

On 27 December 2008, he presented on France 2 in the early evening Stars and Comedy, a show in which eight people mount the stage of the Palace for their first show. Since 2008, he also presented All at the theatre.

On 26 September 2009, he presented Vos chanteurs préférés in the early evening on France 2 with Michael Gregorio who imitated the singers' favorite personalities, sometimes in duets with them.

On 29 December 2009, he presented On a tout révisé in prime time on France 2 with all the "band" that accompanied all these different programs for many years. In that evening, the former writers revisited the news for the 2009 year through games. Four teams of four writers. A second episode was scheduled for 13 July 2010, and a third for late September.

His radio show Get in the Way celebrated its tenth anniversary on 21 October 2009 during a special evening and three hours free at the Olympia and aired Wednesday 25 November and 2 December on France 4. All the writers who participated in the program since its inception were present.

On 31 May 2011, a fourth edition of On a tout révisé was broadcast. During this program, in addition to regular commentators, Laurent Ruquier decided to integrate his new comedians from the show On n'demande qu'à en rire, who make "song gags" or who had passed the "office assistant" test.

In June 2011, a survey by PureMédias, with more than 120,000 voters, voted Laurent Ruquier second class in the "presenter of the year" category behind Nagui who remained first by a large margin. His programs On n'est pas couché and On n'demande qu'à en rire also took the second and third place in the category "Entertainment of the Year".

On 8 February 2013, he presented the 2013 Victoires de la musique live with Virginie Guilhaume.

=== TV programs ===
- 1994: Rien à cirer (France 2), a television adaptation of his radio show
- 1995: Les Niouzes (TF1)
- 1998: Tout le monde en parle with Thierry Ardisson (France 2)
- 1999-2000: Un an de plus (Canal+)
- 2000-2007: On a tout essayé (France 2)
- 2001: 7 d'or (France 2)
- 2002-2005: La nuit des Molières (France 2)
- 2002-2005: Juste pur rire (France 2)
- 2003: Eurovision Song Contest 2003 (France 3) with Isabelle Mergault
- 2003: Drôles de dames (France 3)
- 2004: Eurovision Song Contest 2004 (France 3) with Elsa Fayer
- 2004: Ruquier allume la télé (France 2)
- 2005: French preselection for Eurovision Song Contest 2005 (France 3) with Elsa Fayer
- 2005-2006: Ça balance à Paris (Paris Première)
- 2005-2006: Vos imitations préférées (France 2)
- 2006-2020: On n'est pas couché (France 2)
- 2006: 36 songs (France 3)
- 2007-2008: On n'a pas tout dit (France 2)
- 2008: Stars et Comédie (France 2)
- 2008: Tous au théâtre (France 2)
- 2009: Merci d'être venu! (France 2)
- 2009: Vos chanteurs préférés (France 2)
- 2009: On va s'gêner, 10 years (France 4) television adaptation of his radio show
- 2009-2011: On a tout révisé (four episodes to date) (France 2)
- 2010-2012: On n'demande qu'à en rire (presenter) (France 2)
- Since 2012: On n'demande qu'à en rire (Jury) (France 2)
- 2013: Victoires de la musique with Guilhaume Virginia (France 2)
- 2013: Season 3 of On n’demande qu’à en rire, producer (France 2)
- 2013: C à vous (France 5)
- 2014: L'émission pour tous, producer (France 2)

==== Co-producer ====
- Since 2006: On n'est pas couché (France 2)
- Since 2010: On n'demande qu'à en rire (France 2)

==== One-man shows and theatre ====
From 1997 to 2000, he took to the stage with two performances written by Pascal Légitimus and produced by Just for Laughs: Finally Sweet and Sweet Again. At this occasion, he made a "coming out" and revealed his homosexuality.

Laurent Ruquier is the author of several works:

- 2003 : The press is unanimous (La presse est unanime) staged by Agnes Boury, with Isabelle Mergault (later Marie Laforêt), Gérard Miller (then Jean-François Derec) Steevy Boulay, Raphaël Mezrahi (later Julien Cafaro), Claude Sarraute (later Annie Lemoine), and Isabelle Alonso.
- 2004 : Heat Wave (Grosse Chaleur) staged by Patrice Leconte, with Pierre Benichou (later Gérard Hernandez), Jean Benguigui, Brigitte Fossey (later Danièle Evenou), Catherine Arditi, Annick Alane, and Benoît Petitjean. A French adaptation of the musical Chicago with, among others, Stéphane Rousseau (later Anthony Kavanagh) in the role of the lawyer Billy Flynn.
- 2005-2006 : If it is to be redone (Si c'était à refaire) from September 2005 to April 2006, Variety Theatre, staged by Jean-Luc Moreau, with Isabelle Mergault, Pierre Palmade, Claire Nadeau, and Laurence Badie.
- Landru, from December 2005 to April 2006 at the Théâtre Marigny, staged by Jean-Luc Tardieu with Regis Laspalès (available on DVD from September 2006, dir. Roberto Maria Grassi)
- 2006 : repeat of the play If it is to be redone from September, Théâtre de la Renaissance, with Virginie Lemoine, Francis Perrin, and Bernadette Lafont.
- 2008 : Open Bed by David Serrano, staged by Charlotte de Turckheim, adaptation of Laurent Ruquier with Titoff, Elisa Tovati, Bouffes-Parisiens Theatre in February 2008.
- 2008-2009 : I already see myself (J'me voyais déjà) from 2 October 2008 to 4 January 2009 at the Theatre Gymnasium in Paris, staged by Alain Sachs, with Diane Tell and a troupe of young actors including the Jonatan Cerrada, Arno Diem, and Pablo Villafranca. Comedy musical based on the songs of Charles Aznavour.
- 2011 : Because I fly it well! (Parce que je la vole bien), staged by Jean-Luc Moreau, with Ariel Wizman then replaced by Arnaud Gidoin also Armelle and Catherine Arditi, from February, at the Théâtre Saint-Georges Paris.
- 2013 : A Magic Couple (Un couple magique), directed by Patrice Leconte, in June, at the Theatre Tete d'Or with Danièle Evenou, Julien Boisselier, and Virginie Hocq.

=== Documentaries ===
Do not Ask what is known, directed by Gérard Miller (broadcast 27 December 2012)

=== Theatre management ===
On 28 July 2011, Ruquier acquired a 50% stake in the management company of the Théâtre Antoine located in the 10th arrondissement of Paris. He became director-general alongside managing director Jean-Marc Dumontet. For the playwright, it was a "childhood dream" come true.

For their first choice of actress, the organiser offered Line Renaud. She agreed to play one of the title roles in the play Harold and Maude, written by Jean-Claude Carrière in 1970.

According to Fabrice Luchini, then promoting his film "In the house" in October 2012, Ruquier invested 5 million euros in the acquisition of his theatre.

=== Production of shows ===
In 2005, Laurent Ruquier launched into producing shows. He managed to persuade Marie Laforêt to sing again after more than 30 years of absence from the stage. "The Girl with Golden Eyes" was first produced in Montreal, then in Paris (sold out) and later toured the provinces.

Laurent Ruquier also managed a return to the stage by Véronique Rivière and Pauline Ester in 2006.

Since 2006, he has produced the singer-impersonator Michael Gregorio.

Since 2010, he has produced the comedian Gaspard Proust.

=== Political positioning ===
He has stated many times that he is "left" and "socialist", mainly because of "family tradition". He supported Ségolène Royal during the Socialist primary for the 2007 French presidential election. In 2012, he also voted for Jean-Luc Mélenchon at the first round and for François Hollande at the second round of the French presidential elections, although he revealed he was disappointed by the latter's first two years at the helm of the country.

=== Bibliography ===
- 1994: Nothing Polished (Rien à cirer), Calmann Levy.
- 1995: All the Good in Laurent Ruquier (Le Tout Bon de Laurent Ruquier), Michel Lafon.
- 1996: Nothing Polished: five years (Rien à cirer : les cinq ans) in collaboration with Jean-François Recreated, Michel Lafon.
- 1997: Le Mois par moi. Le Débloque notes, Volumes 1 and 2, Michel Lafon.
- 1998:

- Delighted to welcome you (Ravi de vous recevoir), Michel Lafon.
- Faces of €uros (Gueules d'€uros), drawings by Eleouet Gerard, L'Archipel.

- 1999: One must know how to change certainties (Il faut savoir changer de certitudes), Plon.
- 2000: I will not be in my way (Je ne vais pas me gêner), Plon.
- 2001:

- Seen on radio (Vu à la radio), Plon.
- Faces of €uros (Gueules d'€uros), new edition, L'Archipel.

- 2002:

- My Best of (Mon Best of), Plon.
- It is chronic (C'est Chronique), Plon.

- 2003: Insolent Chronicles (Chroniques insolentes), Hors collection.
- 2004: Do not harm health (Ne nuit pas à la santé), Plon.
- 2005: Get in the Way. The best moments (On va s'gêner. Les meilleurs moments), Plon.
- 2009: Before you forget everything! (Avant que t'oublies tout!), in collaboration with Claude Sarraute, Plon.

=== Personal life ===
Laurent Ruquier announced openly his homosexuality in the late 1990s.

He entered into a civil union on 28 January 2012 with the actor Benoît Petitjean, whose life he has shared since 2002. In March 2021, he announced that he and Petitjean separated in 2018.

Laurent Ruquier is currently in a relationship with Hugo Manos (real name Hugo Skliris), a Franco-Greek personal trainer and influencer. Manos, became famous after his participation to the reality-TV show Les Vacances des Anges 2 : Bienvenue chez les Grecs. The two met in 2018.
