= Benoît Petitjean =

French actor & horse rider (born 1982)

Benoît Petitjean (born in 1982) is a French actor and a horse rider.

He is a theatre and cinema actor, he initially trained under René Simon and completed several internships with director Jean Périmony to develop his acting skills. In 2005, he acted on the stage, in the play Grosse chaleur directed by Patrice Leconte. He was cast in several more roles in the 2000s. He then played in Georges Feydeau's comic play L'Âge d'Or, directed in 2003 by Chantal Brière. In 2004, he played Hédiard in the musical Grosse Chaleur ('Heat Wave'), written by Laurent Ruquier. The young actor performs with Annick Alane, Catherine Arditi and Pierre Bénichou at the Théâtre de la Renaissance, Paris.

He has also acted in a few TV films, such as Préjudices, by Frédéric Berthe in 2006, also La nouvelle Clara and Chat bleu, chat noir, by Jean-Louis Lorenzi in 2006. In the cinema, the actor is noticed in the dramatic comedy Enfin veuve ('Finally widow') by Isabelle Mergault. In 2008, he returned to the stage, notably to Bouffes Parisiens in Open Bed, directed by Charlotte de Turckheim.

He was in a civil solidarity pact with French television presenter Laurent Ruquier until 2018.

== Work ==
=== Film ===
- Enfin veuve (dir. Isabelle Mergault, 2007).
- Little White Lies (dir. Guillaume Canet, 2010).
- Dépression et des potes (dir. Arnaud Lemort, 2012).
- Jappeloup (dir. Christian Duguay, 2013).

=== Television ===
- Grosse chaleur (TV movie, 2006).
- Cabaret (one episode, 2007).
- The Purge (TV movie, 2007).
- Clara Sheller (one episode, 2008).
