= Vanessa Burggraf =

French journalist, television presenter and columnist

- Born: 31 December 1971 (age 54); Mulhouse, France
- Occupations: Journalist, television presenter, columnist
- Notable credit: On n'est pas couché
- Television: France 24 (2006–16); France 2 (2016–17)
- Children: 2

Vanessa Burggraf (born 31 December 1971) is a French journalist, television presenter and columnist.

== Early life and education ==
Vanessa Burggraf was born in Mulhouse in the department of Haut-Rhin in a family of three children. Her brother Steve Burggraf is the co-founder of the chain restaurant Big Fernand, and her sister works in finance. She graduated with a Master of Advanced Studies of literature and a DESS of political and social communication at the Pantheon-Sorbonne University in 1996. She then began her career with an internship in the television program Thé ou café presented by Catherine Ceylac.

== Television career ==
After a stint on Bloomberg Television where she presented the daily news about the economy, Vanessa Burggraf began work on TV5Monde as a reporter and went on later to present programs and special editions. In 2006, after the creation of France 24, she joined the channel to present the morning, noon and afternoon news. She hosted the program Paris Direct in the first part of the evening. From 2012 to 2016 she was the early-evening host of Le Débat from Monday through Thursday.

In 2016, the host Laurent Ruquier chose Burggraf to replace Léa Salamé as a commentator in the program On n'est pas couché on France 2. In March 2017, the press believed that she would be replaced at the end of the season due to poor ratings and her argumentative style. However, Laurent Ruquier announced on 17 April that she would be on the show for a second season along with Yann Moix. But on 6 July Vanessa Burggraf stated in Le Parisien that she was leaving the program to return to France 24 as the news director of the French-speaking channel.

== Other activities ==
- Member of the board of directors of French Institute for International and Strategic Affairs (IRIS)

== Personal life ==
Vanessa Burggraf has two daughters.
