= Jean-Pierre Mader =

French singer-songwriter and producer (born 1955)

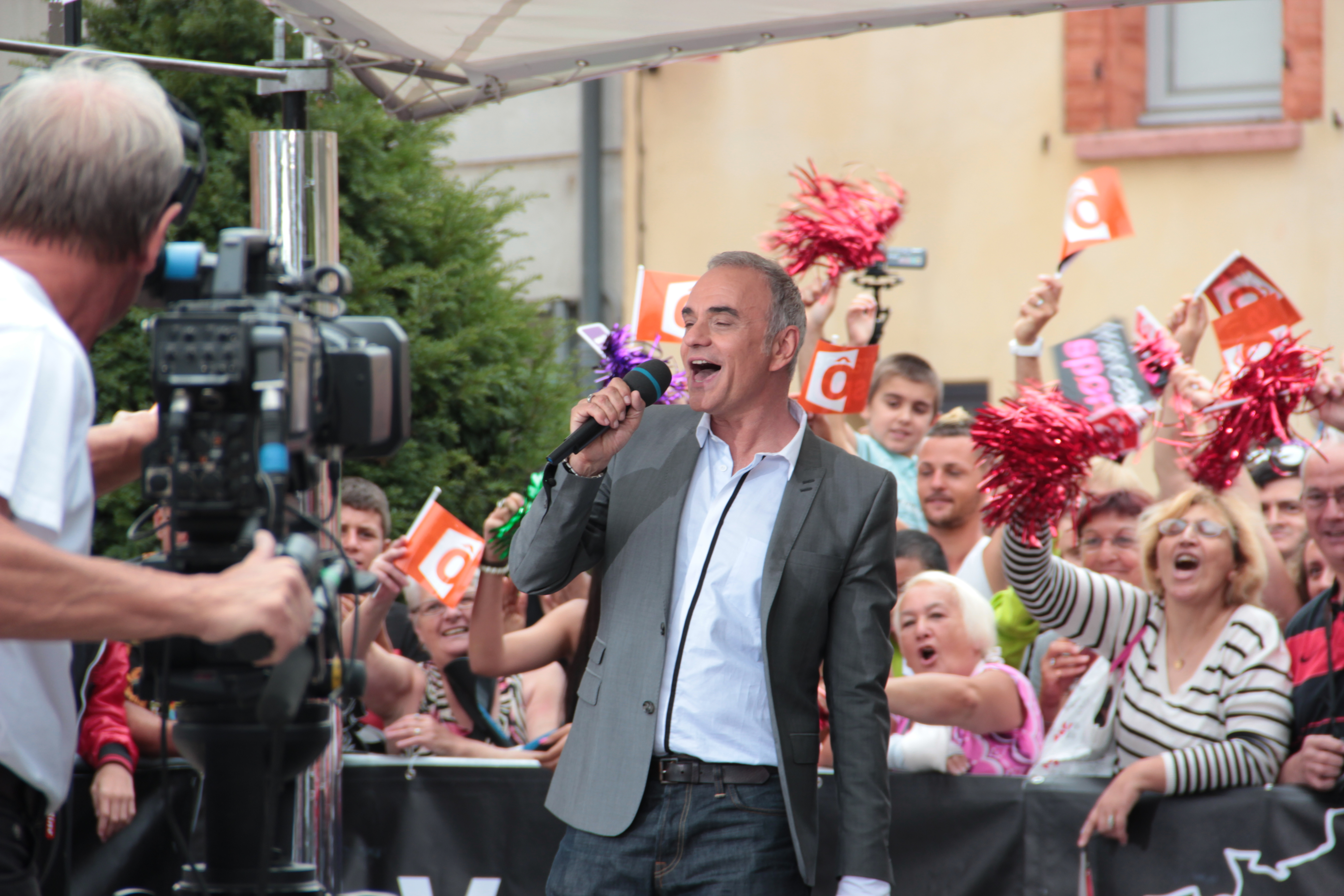

Background information
- Also known as: Macumba de la Night
- Born: Jean-Pierre Mader; 21 June 1955 (age 70)
- Origin: Occitanie, France
- Genres: Pop
- Occupations: Singer-songwriter, producer
- Years active: 1978–present
- Labels: Barclay · Phillips · Flarenasch · WEA · Polydor · Wagram Music
- Website: jeanpierremader.com

Jean-Pierre Mader is a French singer-songwriter and producer (born 21 June 1955 in Toulouse). He remains particularly known for his smash hit "Macumba", released in 1985. After his singing career during the 1980s, he became producer for many French artists, such as Michel Fugain, Philippe Léotard and Bernard Lavilliers.

== Discography ==
=== Studio albums ===
Year	Album	Peak chart positions	Units Sold	Certification	Label
Year	Album	FRA	Units Sold		
1982	Faux Coupable	—	—	—	Philips
1985	Microclimats	3	100 000	Gold	Flarenasch
1986	Outsider				Flarenasch
1989	Midi À Minuit				Polydor
1993	J'Aère	—	—	—	Polydor
2025	Microclimats (30th Anniversary Remastered)	—	—	—	Wagram

=== Live albums ===
Year	Album	Peak chart positions	Units Sold	Certification	Label
Year	Album	FRA	Units Sold		
1987	Mader En Concert (Sous Influences)	—	—	—	Flarenasch

=== Singles ===
Year	Title	Peak chart positions	Units Sold
Year	Title	FRA	Units Sold
1978	Les bandes dessinées	—	—
1982	Faux coupable	—	—
1983	Au bout de son voyage	—	—
1984	Disparue	18	250 000
1985	Macumba	3	600 000
1985	Un pied devant l'autre	8	300 000
1986	Jalousie	42	
1986	Outsider dans son cœur	44	
1987	Nuit de blues	—	—
1987	Obsession	—	—
1987	Rêver plus beau...	—	—
1989	Dixieland	—	—
1989	En résumé... en conclusion	37	
1991	L'amour sans les autres (Feat. Mery Lanzafame)	—	—
1992	Ici ou ailleurs	—	—
1993	India song (Feat. Véronique Rivière)	—	—
1994	Deux choses	—	—
2000	Disparue (Remix)	—	—
2009	Bruxelles – Toulouse (Feat. Leopold Nord)	—	—
2024	Macumba (Igor Blaska Afro House Remix)	—	—
