= Anaïs Bouton =

French journalist

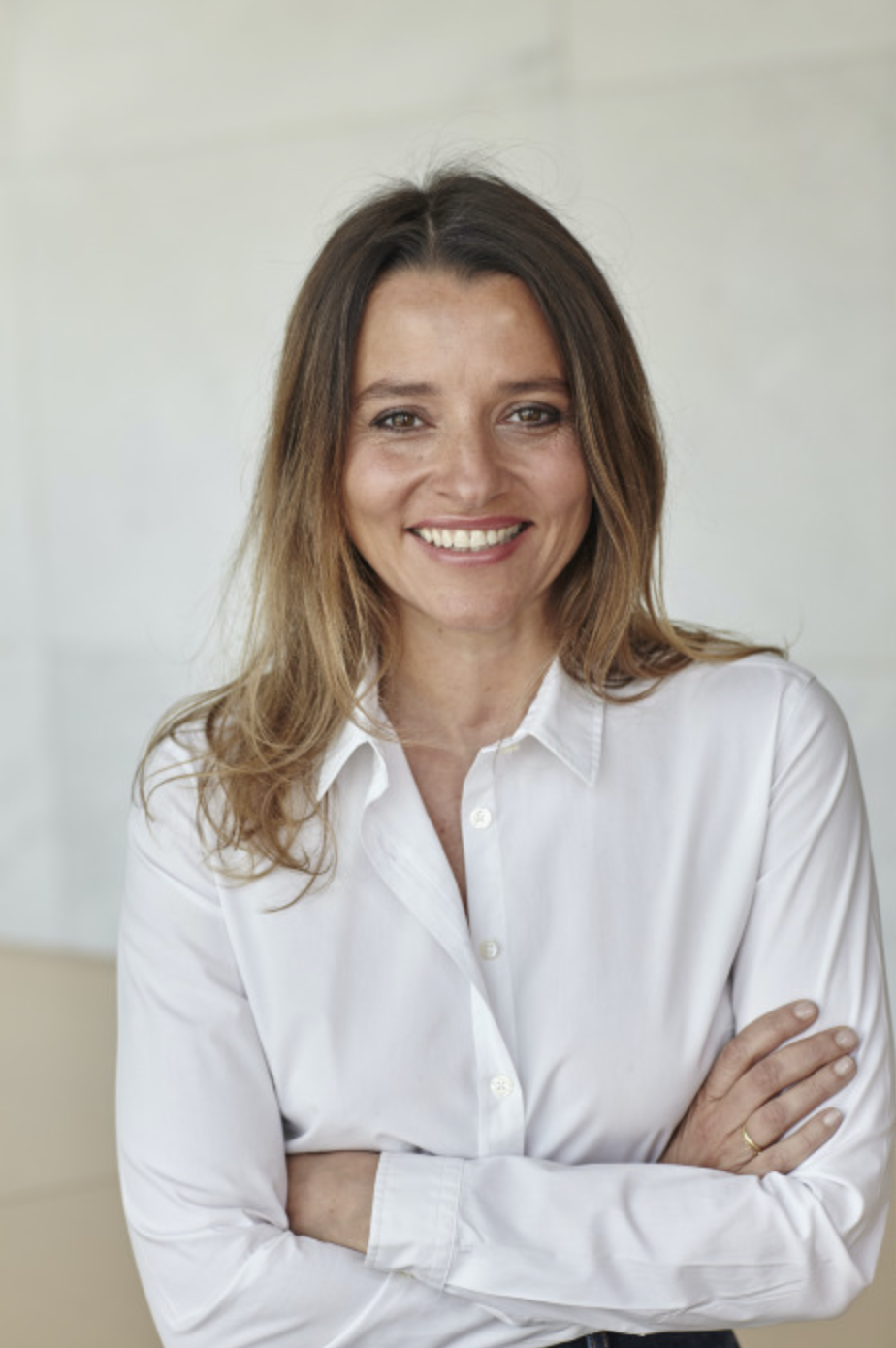
- Anaïs Bouton in November 2016
- Born: 1970 (age 55–56)
- Education: Panthéon-Sorbonne University
- Occupation: Journalist
- Spouse: Xavier de Moulins

Anaïs Martine Marie Bouton (born 1970) is a French journalist and television presenter (with the RTL Group television broadcaster).

== Early life ==
She attended the University of Paris 1 Pantheon-Sorbonne where she completed a Diplôme d'études supérieures spécialisées in Law and Communication and a master's degree in History, and a master's degree in English at the (former, until 2002) London Guildhall University.

== Career ==
=== France Télévisions ===
She joined the state-owned France Télévisions in 1996, appearing on France 2 and France 3.

She has been a freelance journalist for M6 (TV channel) (RTL), France 2 (France Télévisions), and Arte (French-German).

=== RTL ===
She started her career with Paul Amar on 20 heures on Paris Première.

She became a director of the Paris Première (RTL) in 2001; on this channel since October 2016 she has presented Zemmour et Naulleau and has taken part in the programme Ça balance à Paris with Éric Naulleau. From September 2018, she presented La curiosité est un vilain défaut (on RTL) with Thomas Hugues, replacing Sidonie Bonnec who was on maternity leave.

=== Canal+ ===
She has taken part in film programmes on Canal+.

== Personal life ==
She married the French journalist Xavier de Moulins on 7 August 2009 in Nevada, who presents the news on M6 (RTL) and they have three daughters (the eldest from his first wife). She lives in Paris.
