= Audrey Pulvar =

French journalist, TV host and politician

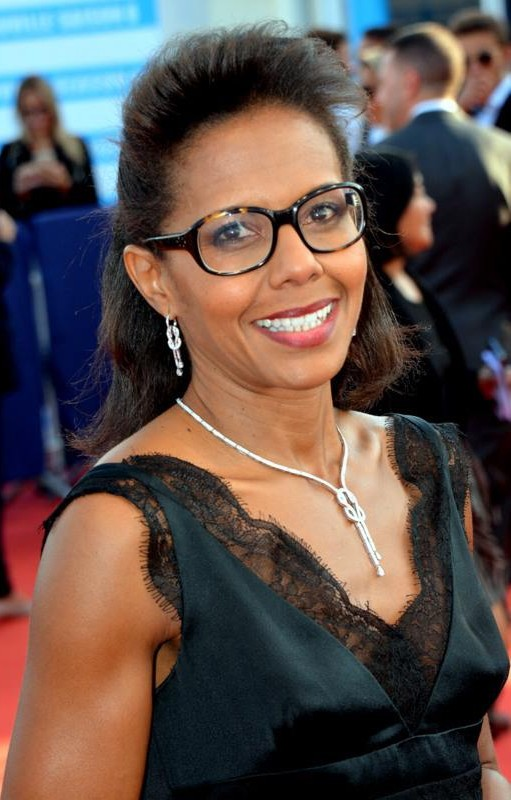
- Audrey Pulvar in 2017
- Born: Audrey Pulvar; 21 February 1972 (age 54); Fort-de-France, Martinique, French West Indies
- Occupations: Journalist, writer
- Notable credit(s): Le Soir 3 on France 3 Le 19/20 on France 3 Audrey Pulvar Soir on I-Télé
- Partner(s): Alain Passard (2008–2009); Arnaud Montebourg (2010–2012)

Audrey Pulvar (French pronunciation: [odʁe pylvaʁ]; born 21 February 1972) is a French journalist, television and radio host and politician. Newsreader of the 19/20 on France 3 from 2005 to 2009, Pulvar has been commentator within Laurent Ruquier's show On n'est pas couché on France 2, during the year 2011/2012 and joined the Television Group Canal+ and its channel D8 in 2013.

== Early life ==
Audrey Pulvar's childhood was spent in Fort-de-France, Martinique, experiencing a rich cultural environment and becoming immersed in politics. Her father, Marc Pulvar, mathematics teacher, was National Secretary of the Martinican Separatist Movement (that he also founded) and Secretary of Martinican Central Workers' Trade Union Confederation. Her mother is a social worker.

From the age of 14 years, Audrey Pulvar lived between her island and mainland France. Although most of her education took place in mainland France, she received her secondary school diploma in the Caribbean before moving back to mainland France (Rouen), and getting a graduate degree in economics (University of Rouen). She continued her studies at the École supérieure de journalisme de Paris (ESJ) which she left in 1994. She then joined Édouard Balladur's presidential election team.

== Career ==
She then joined the Antilles Television staff as an intern during her training at ESJ. She was hired afterwards as a photojournalist and from 1995 was the evening news' anchorwoman. Finally, in 1999, she became deputy editor-in-chief of the channel while continuing as anchor. She stayed there until April 2002, when Jean-Claude Dassier hired her on the satellite continuous news channel LCI as freelance journalist. Starting from December she simultaneously worked on TV5.

In November 2003, she became regional television news presenter at France 3 Marseille. After some replacements on national television, she hosted Soir 3 at Louis Lafarge's side from September 2004. As the first black woman to present a television news on a terrestrial French channel, she refused to see it as a symbol and to take the lead.

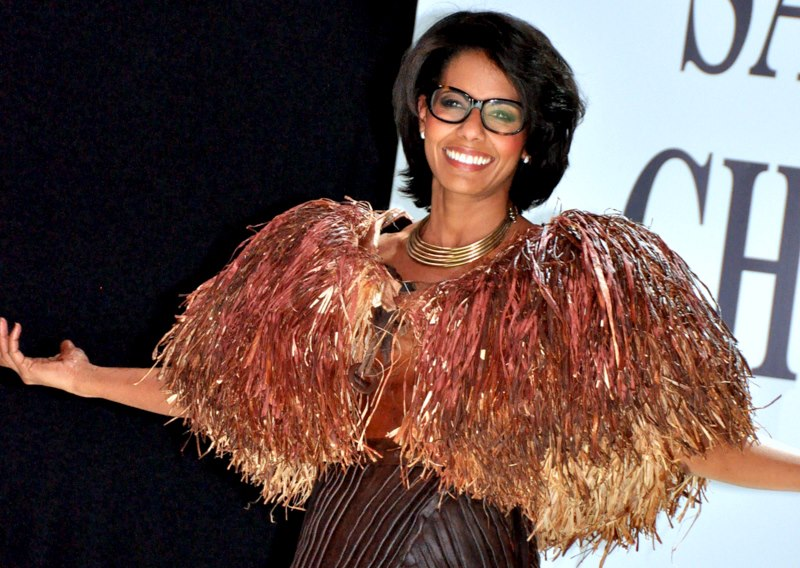
Audrey Pulvar at the 2012 Chocolate Show.

From September 2005, still on France 3, she hosted the evening television news, 19/20. As well, she presented special programmes such as the third edition of Les Victoires du jazz along with Pierre Lescure, and Français, à coeur et à cris in May 2006. In late 2008, she was among the few "well-known" people working in France 3 to join the protest against the prohibition of advertising on France Télévisions.

Since 2006, she has also been the presenter of a monthly magazine named Parlez-moi d'ailleurs, broadcast on the parliamentary channel.

In July 2009, when she left France 3, she joined the news channel i>Télé in order to present a programme from 6:00 to 8:00 P.M. daily, as well as a political interview programme on Sundays. Laurent Bignolas became her successor on 19/20.

After the departure of Nicolas Demorand, who left the early morning radio show of France Inter, Pulvar took over the time slot from 6 to 7 A.M. and gave her program a "prominent place for international news", according to the radio deputy director, Philippe Val. At the same time, she continued to collaborate with i>Télé but chose to reduce her program length to only one hour, from 7:00 to 8:00 P.M.

Later on in November 2010, the i>Télé managers decided to suspend her from the show, in reaction to her partner Arnaud Montebourg officially claiming to be a Socialist Party candidate for the presidential election in 2012. Several weeks later, she finally put an end to the controversy around that dismissal by coming back on air. She was in charge of a 10 minutes-long non-political interview at 7:40 P.M. which was cancelled at the end of the year.

In January 2011, France Inter decided to remove her 7:50 A.M. interview, but she continued to lead the 6/7 A.M. slot and has an all new column at 8:37. In late January 2011, Pulvar returned to i>Télé to present a debate upon social issues without any political guest, known as Arrêt sur l'info. She left the channel in July 2011.

In September 2011, Pulvar appeared on the Saturday night talk show On n'est pas couché on France 2 with Natacha Polony, which is hosted by the popular TV personality Laurent Ruquier.

After being fired from the Ruquier's talk show, Pulvar now appears in the daily talk show Le Grand 8 on D8.

Involved in Parisian local politics for a number of years, on 3 July 2020 Pulvar became Deputy Mayor of Paris in charge of sustainable food, agriculture and supply chains.

== Personal life ==
Pulvar has a daughter born in 1997. She lived with the chef Alain Passard from 2008 to 2009.

Then until November 2012, her partner was the French politician Arnaud Montebourg, former deputy chief secretary of the French Socialist Party, and after May 2012, Minister of Industrial Renewal in the Ayrault government.
