= On n'est pas couché =

French late-night television programme (2006–2020)

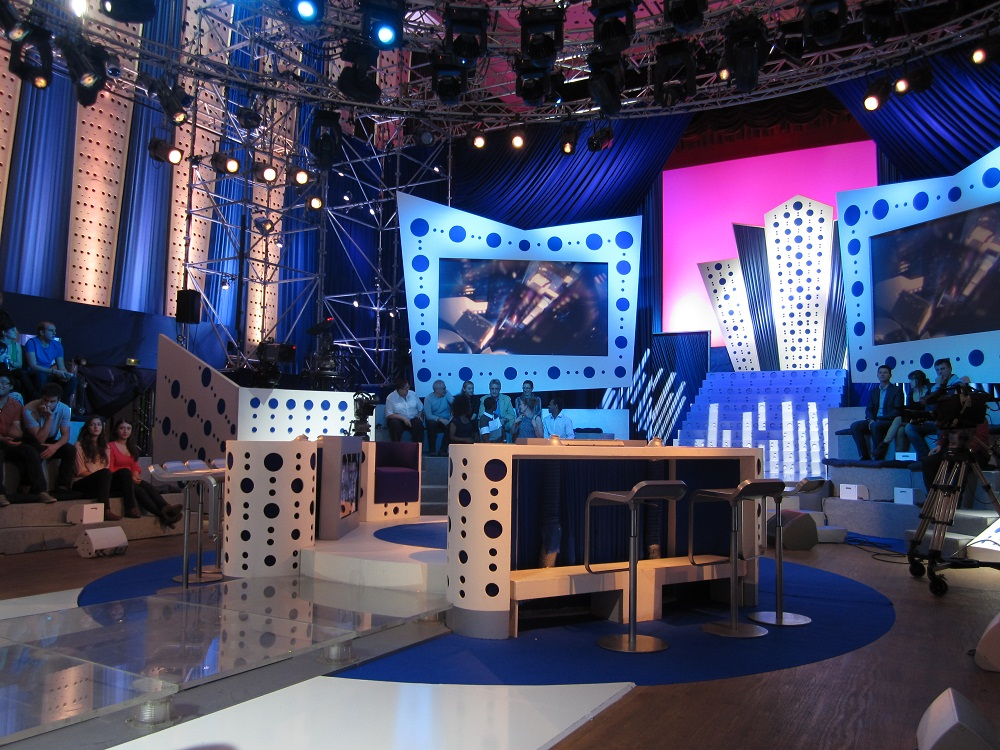
- Presented by: Laurent Ruquier
- Opening theme: In The Shadows by The Rasmus
- Country of origin: France
- Original language: French
- No. of seasons: 14
- No. of episodes: 519

Production
- Producers: Laurent Ruquier; Catherine Barma
- Running time: 190 min

Original release
- Network: France 2
- Release: 16 September 2006 – 4 July 2020

On n'est pas couché ("We're not asleep") was a French talk show broadcast on France 2 on Saturdays at 11 p.m. and hosted by Laurent Ruquier. It was produced by Ruquier and Catherine Barma. It first aired on 16 September 2006; after fourteen seasons, it ended on the 4 July 2020. Ruquier was assisted by two columnists: notable personalities starred on the show, including Éric Zemmour, Éric Naulleau, Natacha Polony and Yann Moix. Secondary columnists were also sometimes present, including humourists Jonathan Lambert and Nicolas Bedos.

== Content ==
The show ran for about 190 minutes with no advertising breaks. Ruquier started by a monologue that lasted for about 20 minutes; he presented the past week's news with humour. He also presented some of the week's best cartoons before turning to his columnists for comments. The five guests (mainly actors, singers, writers) then talked about their projects and interacted with the columnists. A personality (often a politician, philosopher, union leader) was then interviewed by Ruquier and his columnists for about an hour.

== Columnists ==
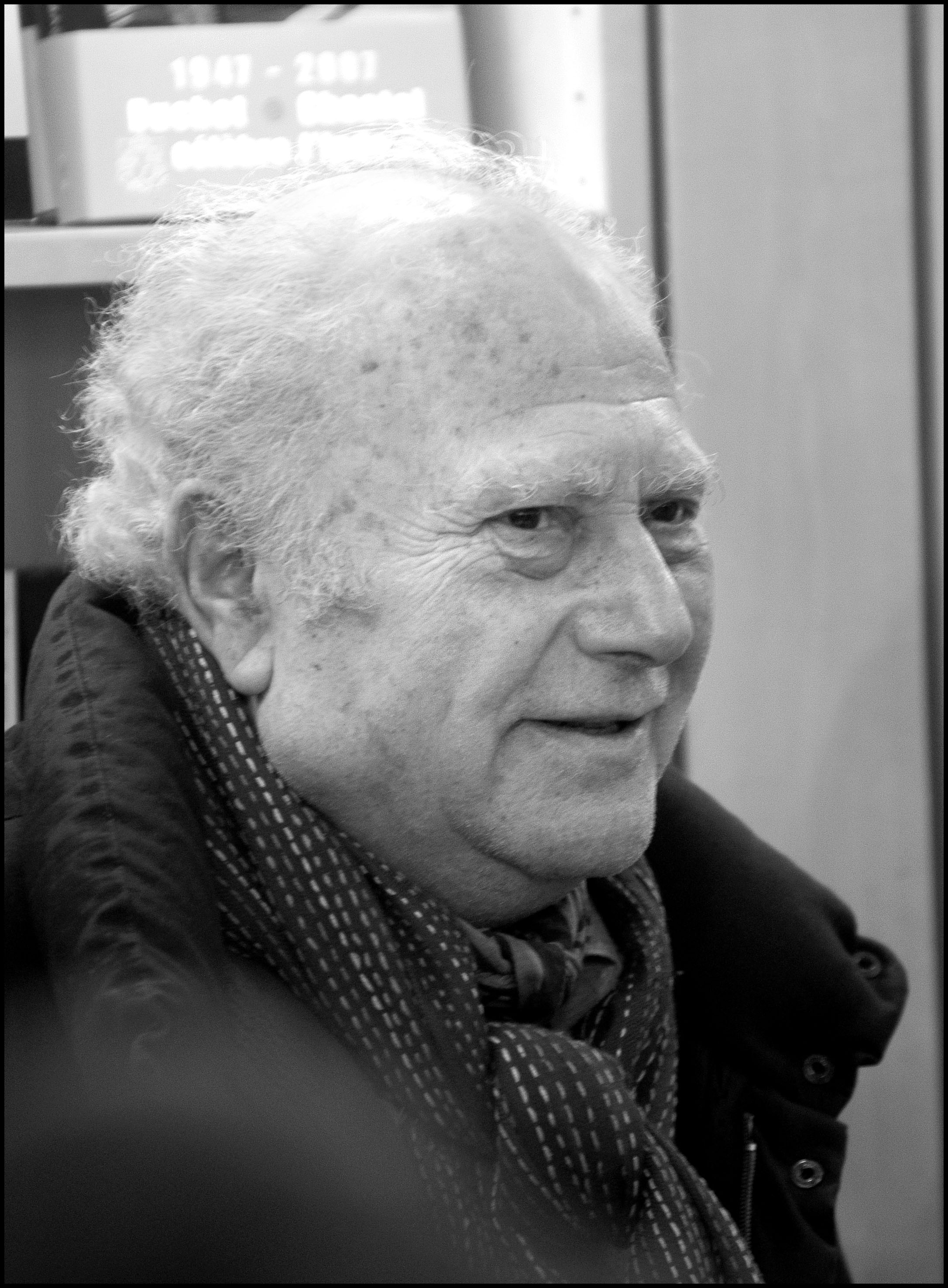
Michel Polac

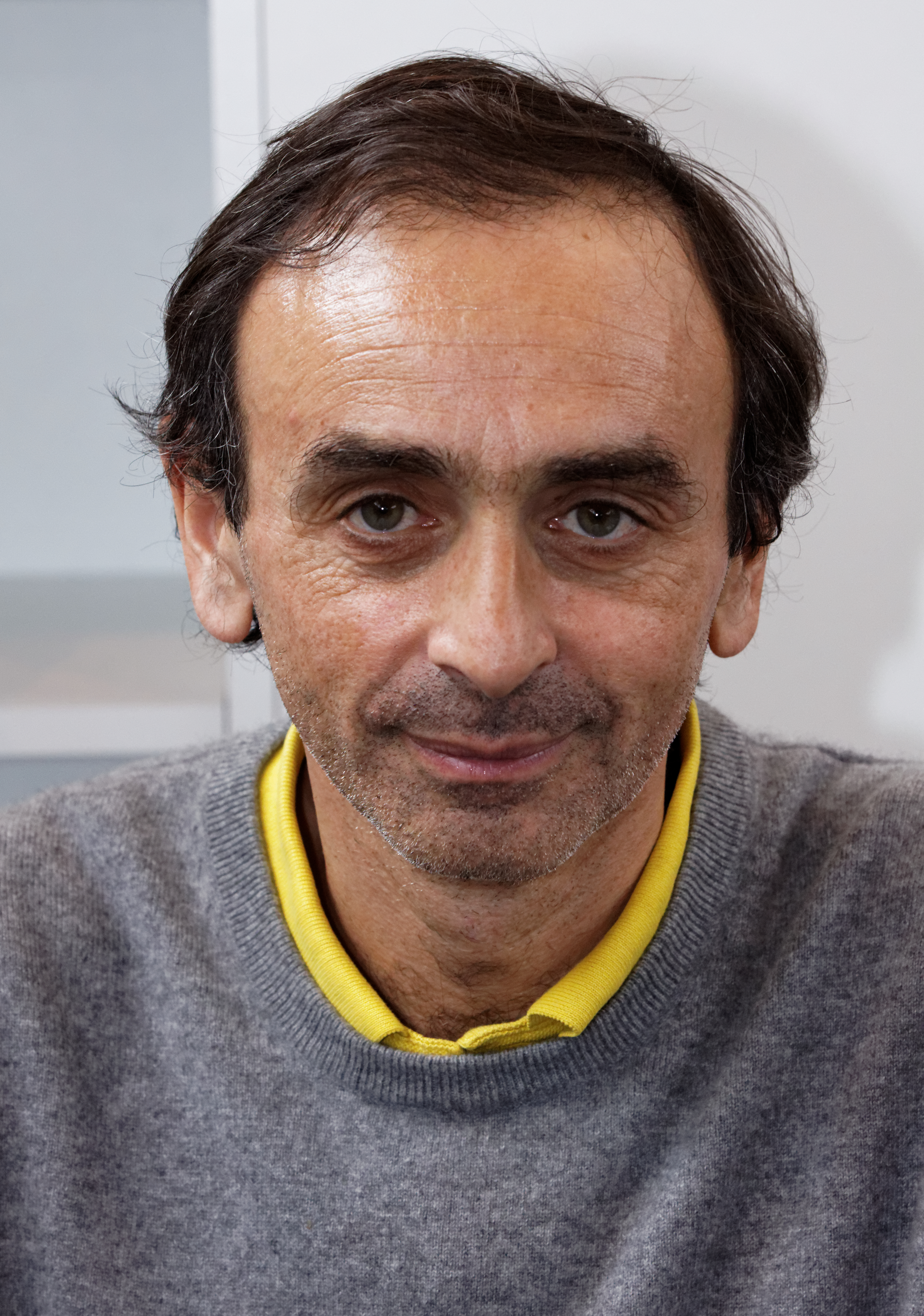
Éric Zemmour

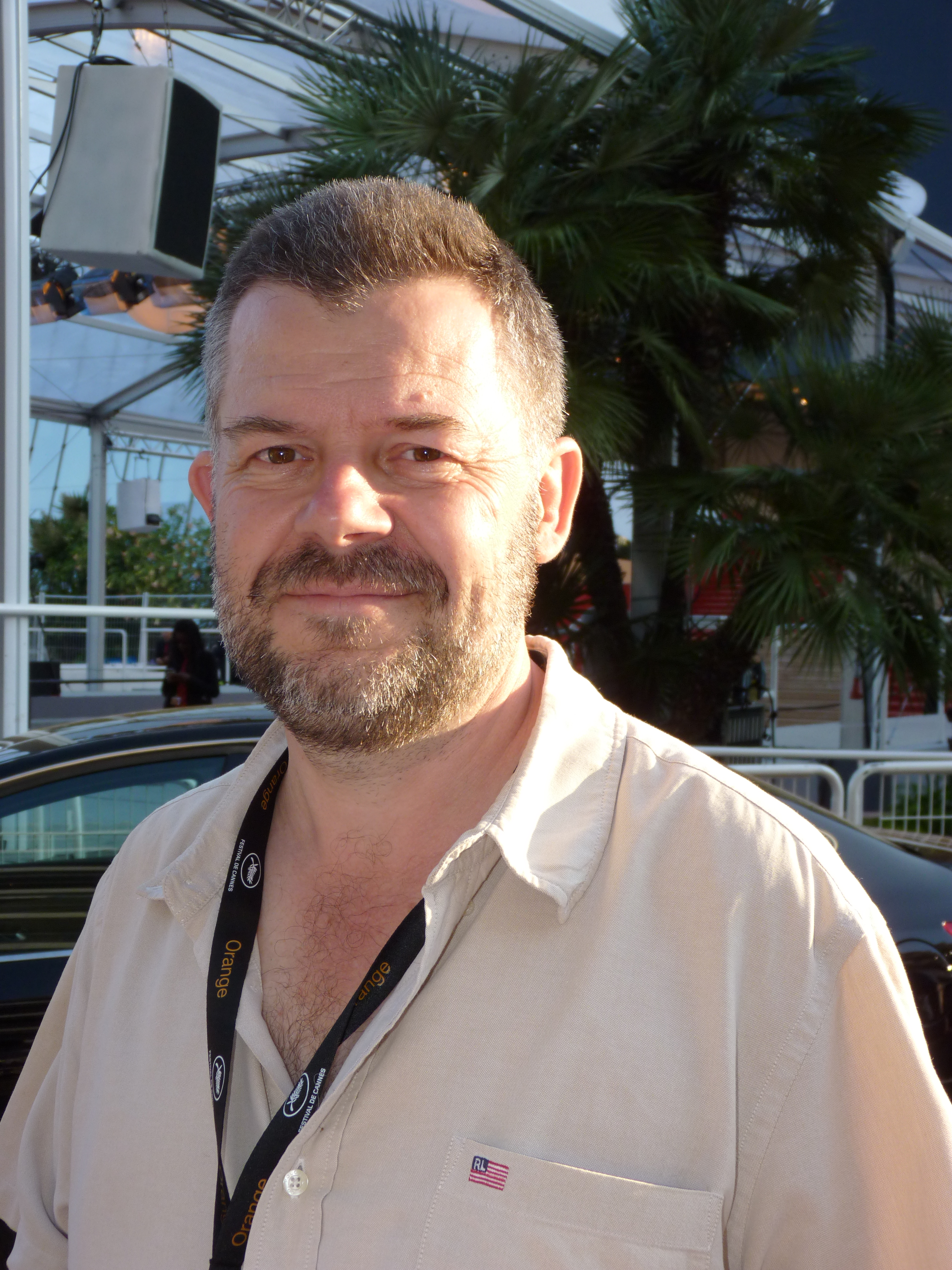
Éric Naulleau

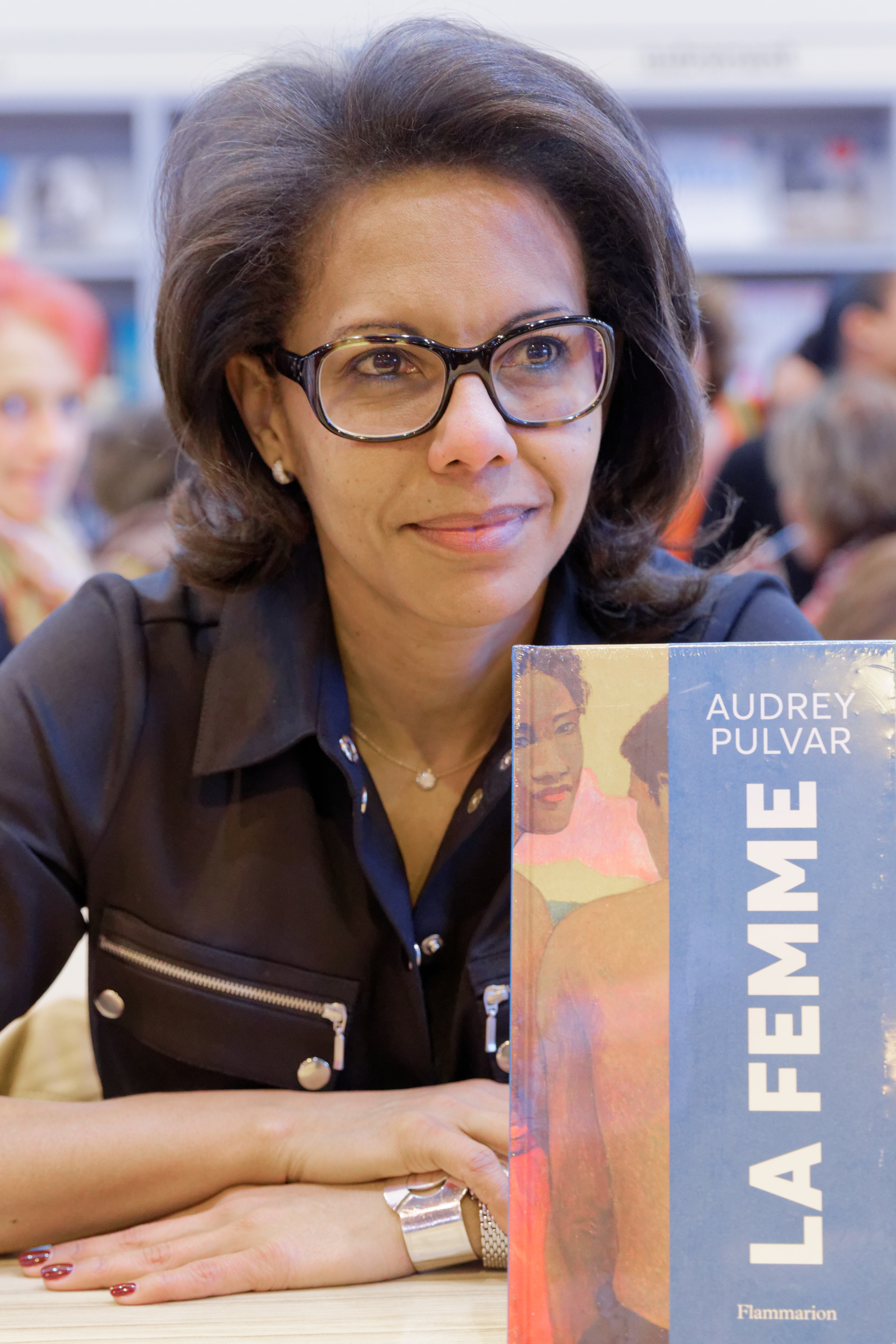
Audrey Pulvar
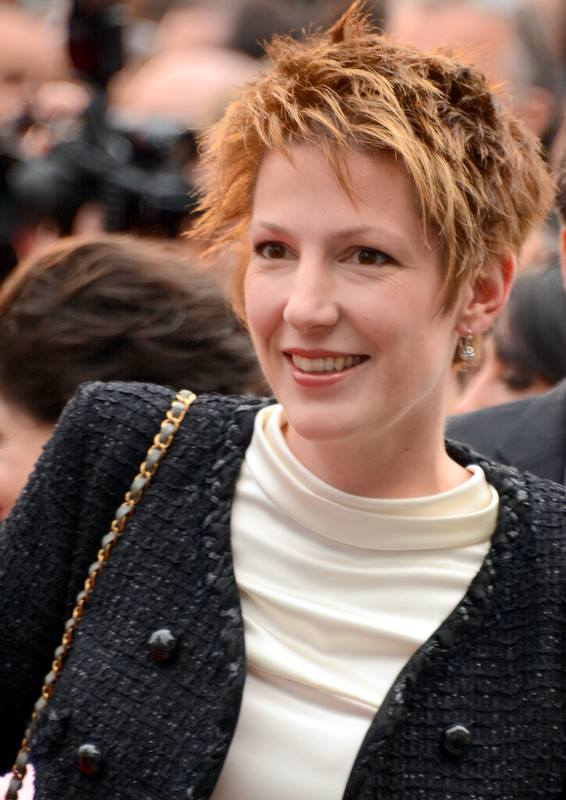
Natacha Polony

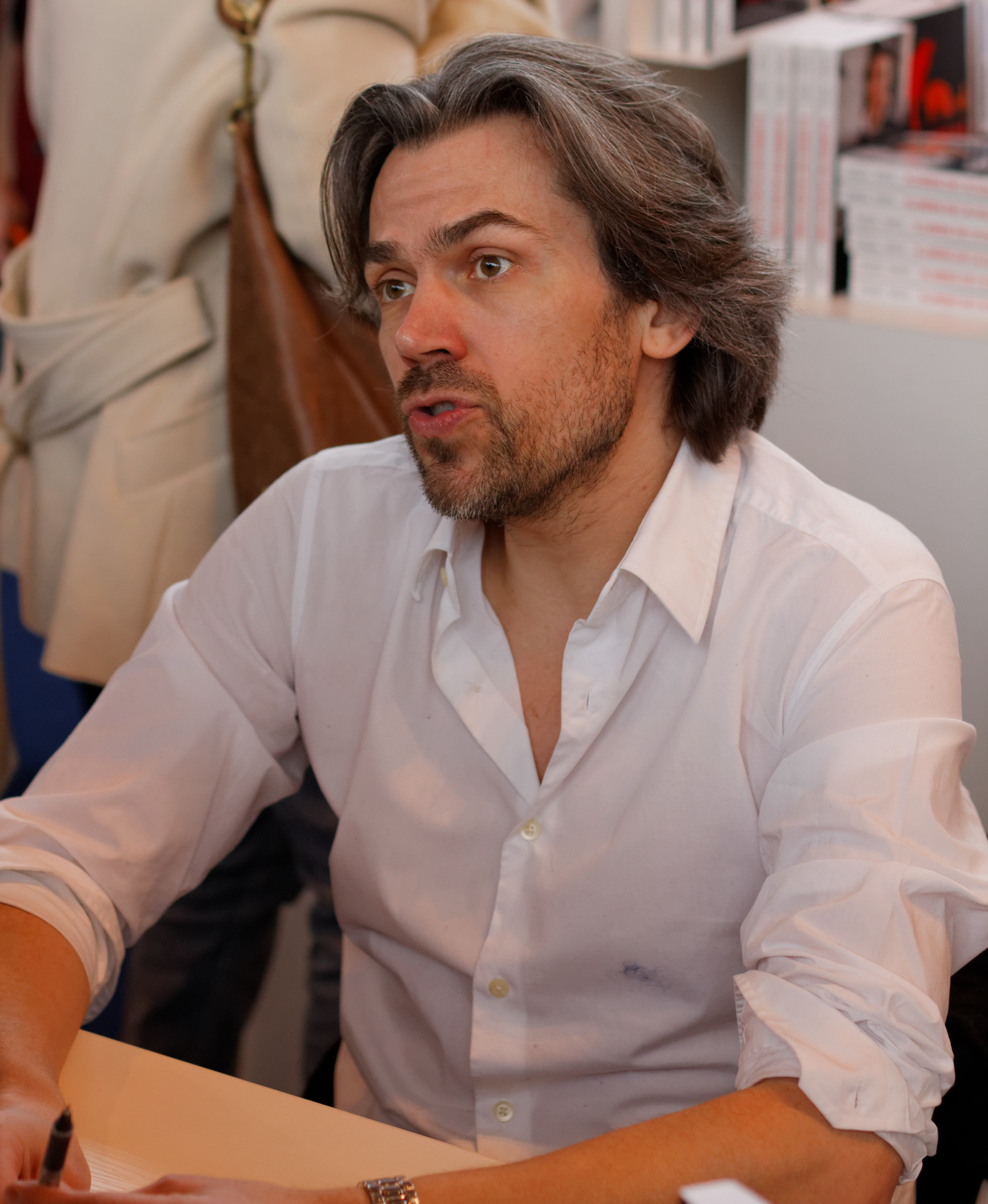
Aymeric Caron

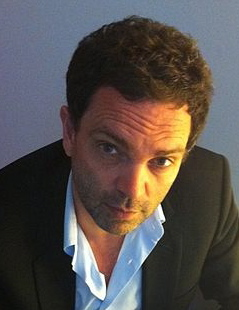
Yann Moix

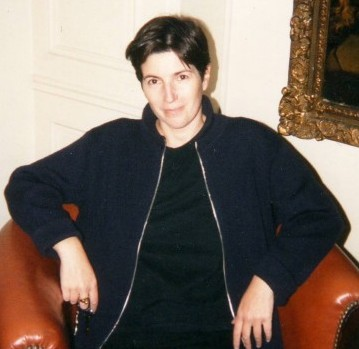
Christine Angot

Columnists per season
1 (2006–2007)	2 (2007–2008)	3 (2008–2009)	4 (2009–2010)	5 (2010–2011)	6 (2011–2012)	7 (2012–2013)	8 (2013–2014)	9 (2014–2015)	10 (2015–2016)	11 (2016–2017)	12 (2017–2018)	13 (2018–2019)
Main
Éric Zemmour					Natacha Polony			Léa Salamé		Vanessa Burggraf	Christine Angot	
Michel Polac	Éric Naulleau				Audrey Pulvar	Aymeric Caron			Yann Moix			Charles Consigny
Secondary
Jonathan Lambert					Arnaud Tsamere	Jonathan Lambert	Nicolas Bedos		Marc-Antoine Le Bret	Fary	Claire Chazal	
Jean-Luc Lemoine		Michaël Gregorio		Les Lascars gays	Jérémy Ferrari		Donel Jack'sman		Bérengère Krief			
Florence Foresti	Axelle Laffont	Ghislaine Ottenheimer		Edwy Plenel	Florian Gazan							
Mustapha El Atrassi	Christophe Alévêque											
