= Éric Naulleau =

French literary critic and media personality (born 1961)

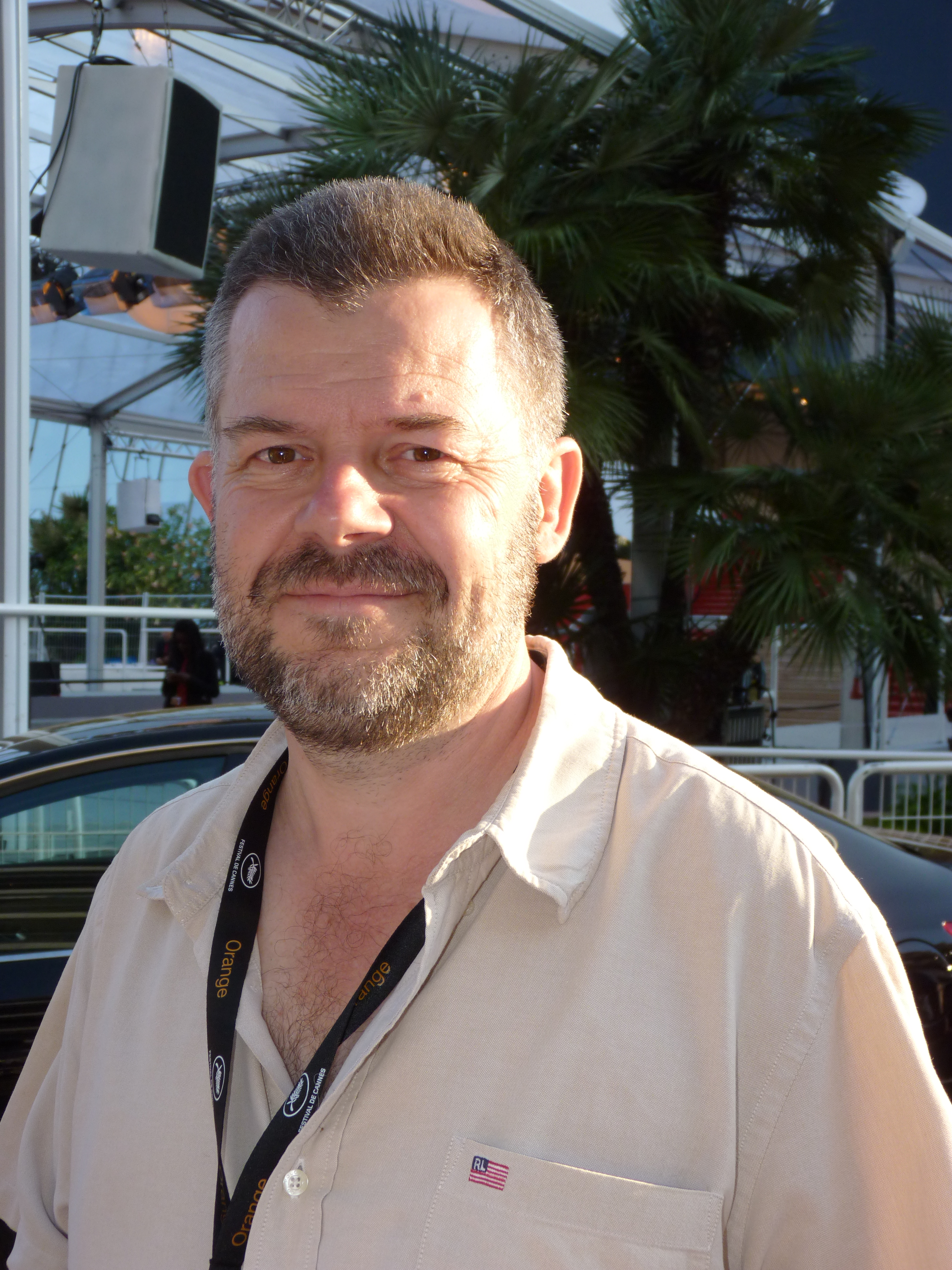
- Naulleau at the 2011 Cannes Film Festival
- Born: 11 March 1961 (age 65); Baden-Baden, West Germany (now Germany)
- Education: Paris Nanterre University
- Occupations: Literary critic, editor, essayist, translator, columnist
- Spouse: Veronika Nentcheva

Éric Naulleau (French pronunciation: [eʁik nolo]; born 11 March 1961) is a French literary critic, editor, essayist and columnist.

== Career ==
Naulleau is best known for his appearances on television shows such as On n'est pas couché (2007–2011), hosted by Laurent Ruquier on Saturdays at 11 pm on France 2, Balance ton post ! (2018–present), hosted by Cyril Hanouna on Thursdays at 9:15 pm on C8, as well as alongside Éric Zemmour on Zemmour et Naulleau (2011–2021), hosted by Anaïs Bouton on Wednesdays at 8:45 pm on Paris Première. In 2025, he was appointed editor-in-chief of Lui, a French adult-entertainment magazine.
