= René Simon =

French actor (1898–1971)

René Simon (1898 in Troyes – 1971) was a French actor and founder in 1925 of the Cours Simon drama school in Paris. Notable alumni of Cours Simon include Benoît Petitjean and Jean Reno.
