= Jappeloup de Luze =

Show horse (1975–1991)

Jappeloup
- Breed: Selle Français
- Sire: Tyrol II (TF)
- Dam: Vénérable
- Maternal grandsire: Oural
- Sex: Gelding
- Foaled: March 12, 1975; France
- Died: November 5, 1991 (16 years old)
- Colour: Dark bay
- Breeder: Henry Delage
- Owner: Henry Delage and then Pierre Durand
- Rider: Pierre Durand

Jappeloup was born on March 12, 1975, at equestrian farm of Henry Delage in Saint-Savin in Gironde and died on November 5, 1991. He was a show jumping champion Selle Français horse, born to a French Trotter father and a Thoroughbred mother.

He was first ridden by Françoise Terrier-Thuault for two years before being purchased by Pierre Durand in 1981. The two of them won numerous titles, including French, European and Olympic champions. Jappeloup is considered to be one of the most successful show jumping horses of all time, despite his modest origins and his height: only 158 cm, which is relatively small to compete in this discipline.

He became one of the most famous horses of the country. He is the last French horse to have won the Olympic title in show jumping (1988 Seoul Olympics). He appeared on Yves Mourousi's TV news program as guest of honour, during which Pierre Durand would describe him as the "horse of his life". For his retirement from competition in September 1991, a jubilee was held at the foot of the Eiffel Tower in his honour, as well as to thank his supporters. Two months later, at only 16 years old, Jappeloup died of cardiac arrest. He was buried in the commune of Saint-Seurin-sur-l'Isle.

== History ==
Jappeloup was born on March 12, 1975, in Henry Delage's equestrian farm in Saint-Savin, in Gironde. His father was a little-known French Trotter named Tyrol II, his mother was an old Thoroughbred race mare named Vénérable. He was sometimes called an "pasture incident", this type of cross-breeding never giving interesting results. But according to his breeder, this cross-breeding is no coincidence, as it was to combine the energy with the strength of the hind legs.

He was bred and made famous by Henry Delage, who had initially intended him for jump racing. However, the young rider Françoise Terrier-Thuault "begged" the breeder to keep him for show jumping, a discipline which revealed Jappeloup's aptitudes for jumping. Henry Delage introduced 4-year-old Jappeloup to Pierre Durand who first refused to try him, claiming he was "too small". The horse showed great ease despite his modest height, but Jappeloup was so small that it could have prevented him from competing internationally. One year later, Pierre Durand reconsidered his decision after seeing Jappeloup jump: the horse had a temper and was disobedient but had incredible jumping capacities. He immediately got in touch with the breeder and Jappeloup never left him ever since. Over the course of his career, he was sponsored by the house "De Luze", which is why his name was changed into Jappeloup de Luze.

=== Career ===
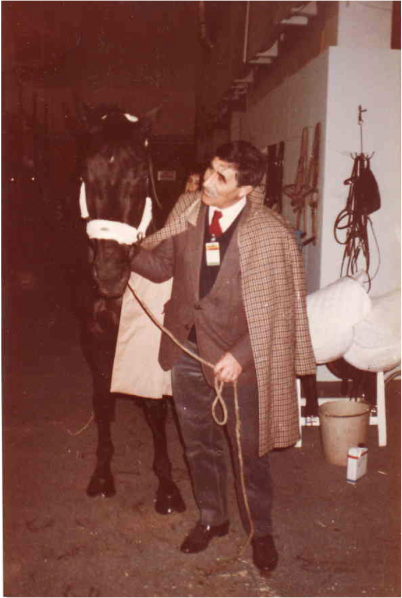
Jappeloup with his owner Henry Delage at the Stockholm FEI World Equestrian Games, Sweden, in 1990.

Jappeloup won numerous titles with Pierre Durand: French champions in 1982, European champions in 1987, eleven golden medals in Grand Prix including five in World Cup and three in FEI Nations Cup, and Olympic champions at Seoul Olympics in 1988. In 1984, at the Los Angeles Olympics, during the team test, 9-year-old Jappeloup refused a fence. His rider was thrown over the other side of the fence, the reins and the bridle stayed in his hands and the horse fled towards the stables under the scrutiny of the entire world's cameras. After his fall, Pierre Durand was heavily criticized but kept the horse and pursued his training. In 1986, Jappeloup de Luze, though a gelding and thus not being able to reproduce, was estimated to 3 750 000 French francs. In 1988, at Seoul Olympics, after winning the gold medal thanks to a clear round, Pierre Durand attached it to Jappeloup's leather breastplate to thank him, in front of the world's TV cameras. Jappeloup also appeared as guest of honour in Yves Mourousi's TV News Program.

Even during training, Jappeloup was put in the pasture at least two hours a day to relax. In 1990, at the first FEI World Equestrian Games, in Sweden, he fainted after the team tests. Pierre Durand then decided to give a well-deserved retirement.

=== Retirement and death ===
For Jappeloup's retirement in 1991, a jubilee was held in Paris at the Champ-de-Mars, at the foot of the Eiffel Tower, with a show jumping competition gathering the top 25 riders of the moment. On November 5, 1991 (two months later), at only 16 years old, Jappeloup died of cardiac arrest. The rider received many letters expressing support, and he buried his horse in his pasture, on his estate. A little later, Pierre Durand was accused of killing Jappeloup for insurance money. Pierre Durand was vindicated after a libel suit, but the rumor persisted which would put a strain on his political career.

People regularly visit with emotion Jappeloup's tombstone in the commune of Saint-Seurin-sur-l'Isle.

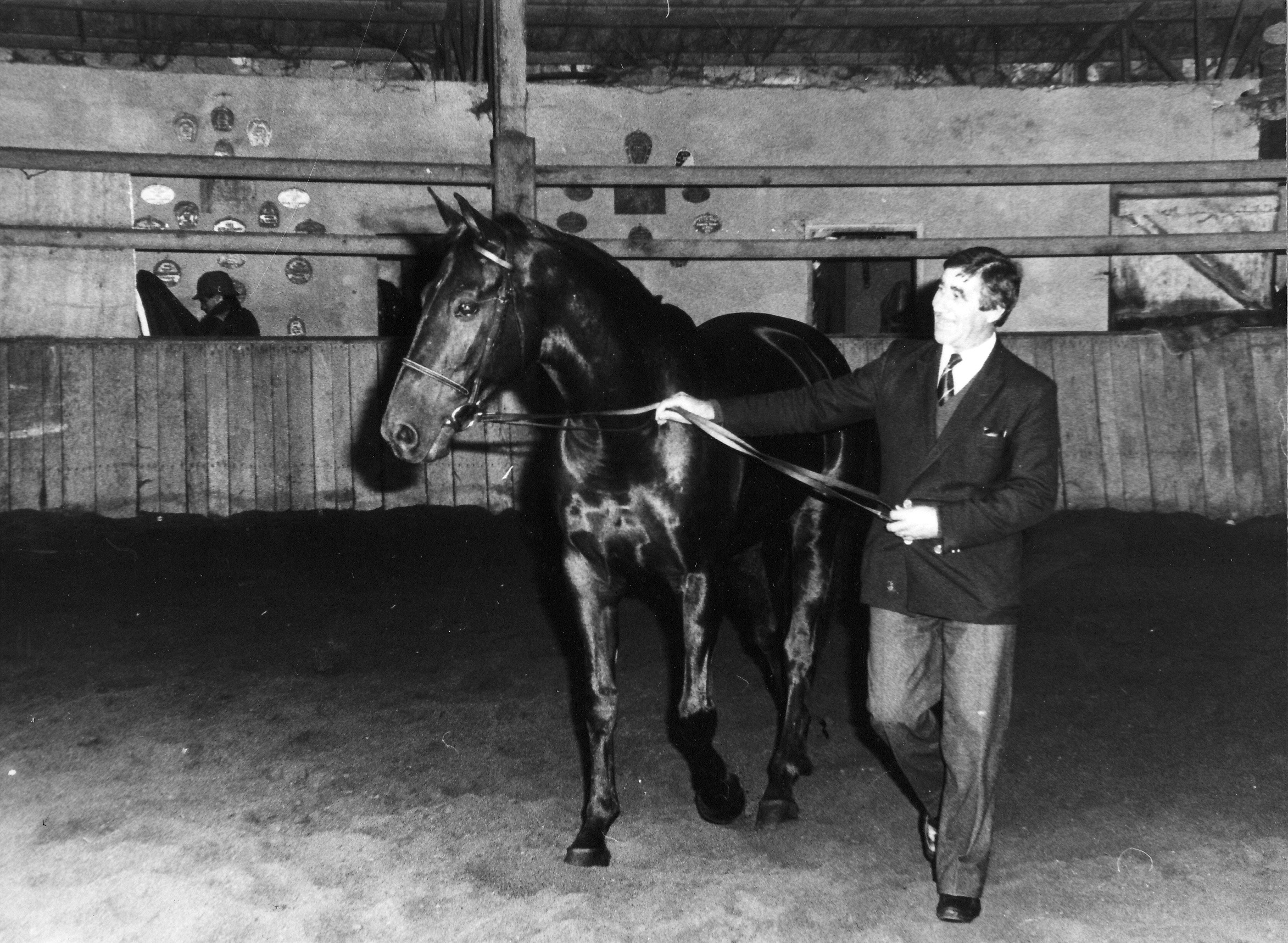
Jappeloup with Henry Delage

Jappeloup was a small dark bay gelding, 158 cm for about 470 kg. He neither had the physique and the gaits, nor the origins of the horses that usually compete in international show jumping competitions. Pierre Durand admitted that he was rather ugly, ungrateful and lanky from far and near and that he walked with a rolling gait that is peculiar to Trotters. It was under the saddle that one could feel the difference, Jappeloup showing a lot of energy. He showed a true respect for the poles and multiplied efforts so as to never touch them, but this behavior actually came from his fear of fences.

Of an undisciplined and capricious nature, Jappeloup was mostly known for his spirit, and his restlessness during competitions. As he was a gelding, he had no descendants.

== Accomplishments ==
A non-exhaustive list of Jappeloup's and Pierre Durand's titles.

- 1982: Senior French champions in Fontainebleau
- 1983: Team silver medal at the Mediterranean Games in Rabat
- 1985: 3rd place at the Show Jumping World Cup final in Berlin
- 1986: Senior French champions in Fontainebleau and team bronze at the World Show Jumping Championships
- 1987: Individual gold medal and team silver at the FEI European Jumping in St. Gallen
- 1988: Individual gold medal and team bronze at Seoul Olympics and 2nd place at the World Cup final in Goteborg
- 1989: Team silver medal at the FEI European Jumping Championships in Rotterdam
- 1990: Team gold medal at the World Show Jumping Championships in Stockholm and 2nd place at the Show Jumping World Cup final in Dortmund

== Origins ==
Jappeloup was born to a French Trotter father and a Thoroughbred mother. The Haras Nationaux registered him as a Selle Français section A, which means without foreign cross-breeding. It was his stud-book of birth. On his official website, Pierre Durand also states he was a Selle français.

Origins of Jappeloup
Sire Tyrol II FT	Feal FT	Kairos FT
Sire Tyrol II FT	Feal FT	Passaka FT
Sire Tyrol II FT	Ide Panache	Totira FT
Sire Tyrol II FT	Ide Panache	Sidonue Panache FT
Dam Vénérable TB	Oural TB	Balmoral TB
Dam Vénérable TB	Oural TB	Sournoise TB
Dam Vénérable TB	Velours TB	Foxlight TB
Dam Vénérable TB	Velours TB	Vitoria TB

== Legacy ==
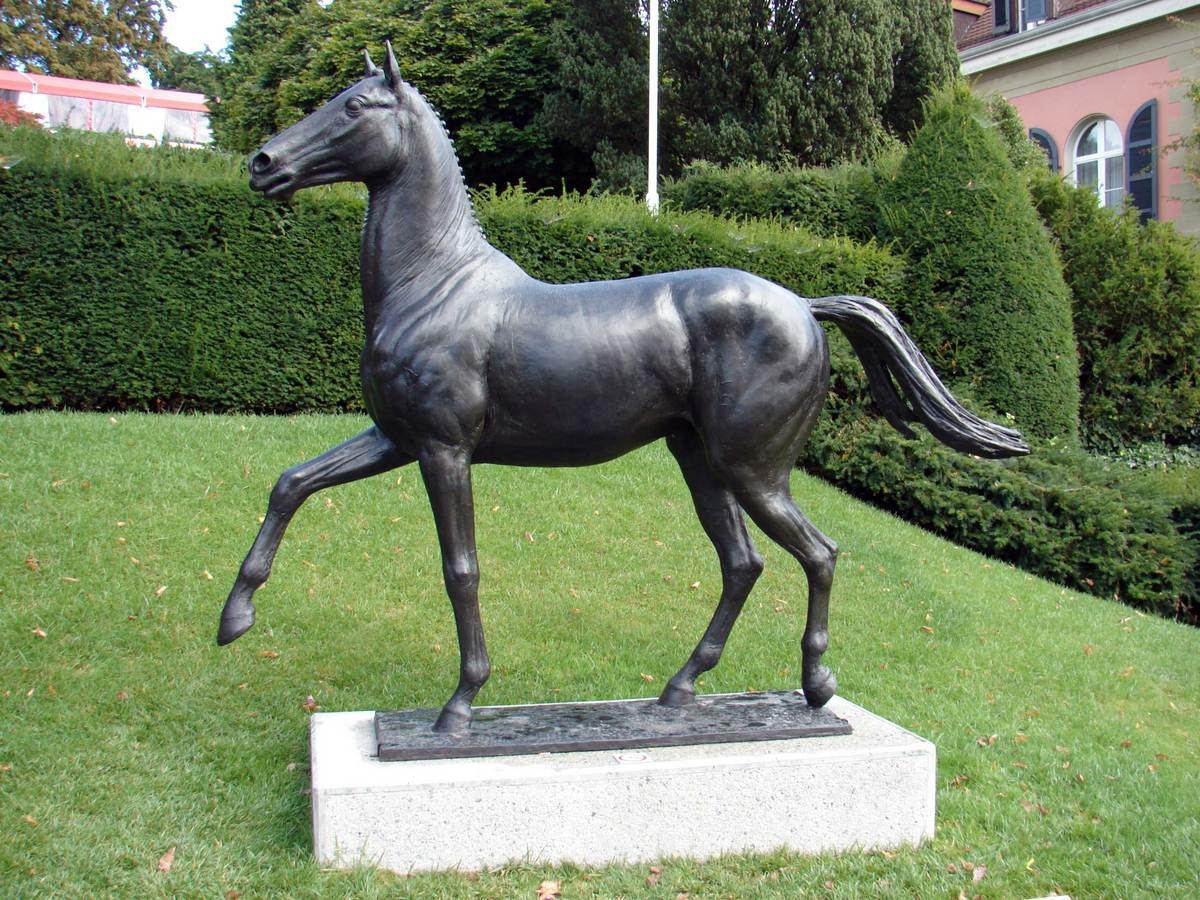
Full-size statue of Jappeloup, at the Olympic Museum in Lausanne, sculpted by Gabriël Sterk.

Pierre Durand calls him the "horse of his life". In 1997, the French equestrian magazine L'Année Hippique designated Jappeloup as being the second most successful horse since Second World War. He was elected by a vote by 37 experts from the equestrian sports community. The public especially remembers the battle between Jappeloup and his gray competitor Milton, under the saddle of the British rider John Whitaker, at show jumping competitions.

=== Films ===
A documentary was produced in 1993 by Christian Chevreuse, on Jappeloup's life and sports career with Pierre Durand, released on VHS on January 1, 1994, by Hachette. In September 2011 Christian Duguay began shooting a film with Guillaume Canet, who wrote the screenplay, playing the role of Pierre Durand. Several horses were used to play the role of Jappeloup. The film was released on March 13, 2013.

=== Legal fight ===
"Jappeloup" is a trademark registered by Henry Delage many years ago, to market wine and clothing. In March 2013, when Christian Duguay's film was released, the rider Pierre Durand sued Jappeloup's breeder in order to reclaim the exploitation rights of the horse's name. According to the French paper Sud Ouest, who disclosed the case, part of the conflict was about the "popular legend" that Pierre Durand would have created regarding the horse's origins, which discredited the breeder's work while giving the rider more importance than he truly had.

The journalists from the French paper L'Express revealed that Pierre Durand sued Acajou Films, Pathé and Nathan, regarding the marketing of by-products of the film Jappeloup. According to Pierre Durand's lawyer, Pierre being Jappeloup's owner, he also is "the guarantor of the horse's heritage". Henry Delage saw a financial interest instead, clarifying Pierre Durand was ready to sell Jappeloup to Americans, and that only the vet check prevented him from doing so. In April 2013, Pierre Durand also sued Editions du Moment. According to the editor, this summons follows the publishing house's refusal to pay him 5 000 euros for the right to reuse the name "Jappeloup" which he had registered as a trademark,

== See also ==
- Jappeloup (the film)
- List of individual horses
