= Pokeware =

Pokeware was a set of protocols, an ad exchange, and a client-server program that enables viewers to search for information about objects within video for real-time search results.

Pokeware was released by Pokeware, a company founded by Maryse Liburdi. In 2017, Liburdi pleaded guilty to having defrauded investors of millions of dollars, having used investors' money to pay for her personal life. She had manipulated bank accounts to make the company look healthy. The US Justice Department has stated that between 2008 and the company's closure in January, 2015, Pokeware "earned little or no revenue".

== Features ==
The Pokeware interface allowed a user to select objects within images and video streams to learn more information about that object. Real-time analytics are offered to measure performance without compromising visitor privacy.

== Partnerships ==
- GuestLogix Inc., provider of onboard retail systems for the passenger travel industry.
- Playin' TV is a North American, European and Latin American interactive television channel, owned by Visiware America.
- PayPal online payment service.
