= Gérard Leclerc =

French journalist (1951–2023)

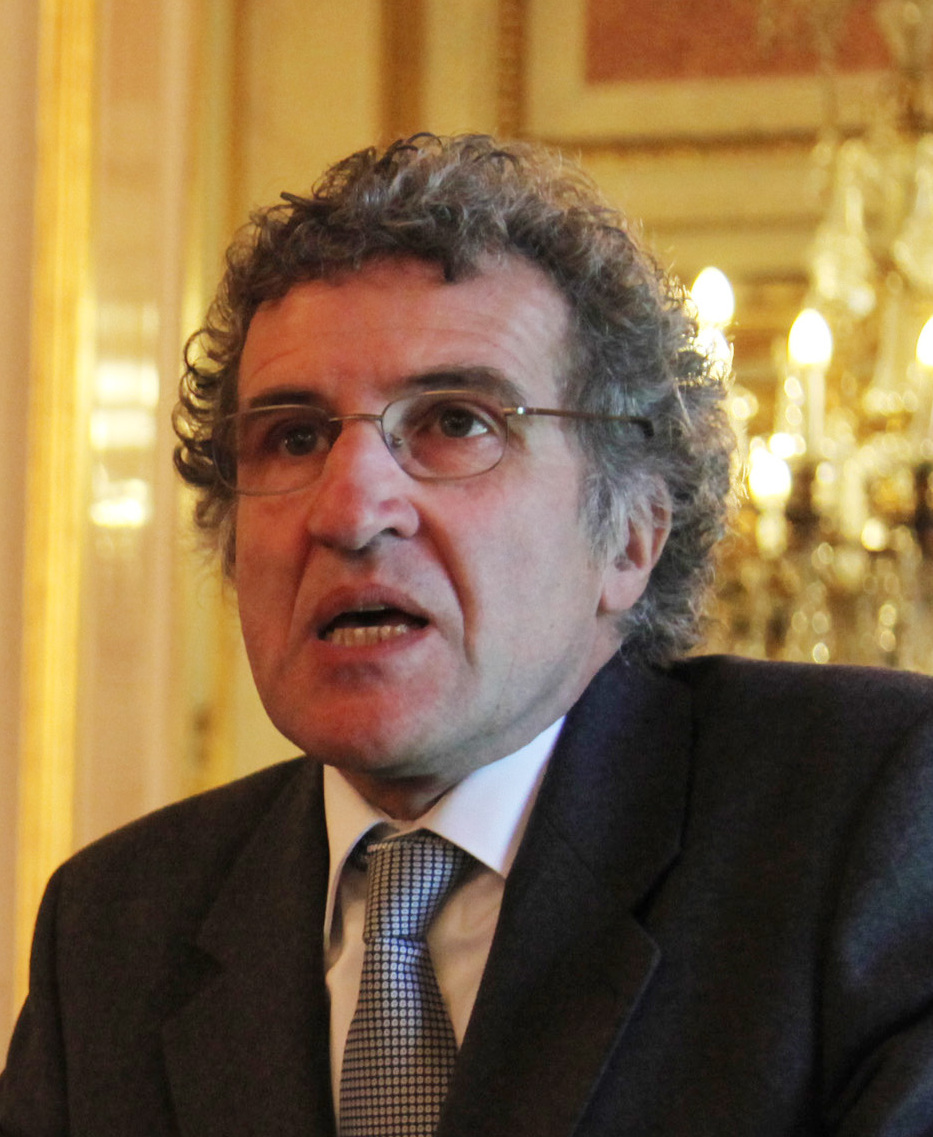
- Leclerc in 2010
- Born: 2 September 1951; Neuilly-sur-Seine, France
- Died: 15 August 2023 (aged 71); Lavau-sur-Loire, Loire-Atlantique, France
- Education: Lycée Lakanal
- Alma mater: University of Paris 1 Panthéon-Sorbonne; Sciences Po
- Occupation(s): Journalist columnist
- Television: France Télévisions; CNews
- Spouse: Julie Leclerc (m. 1981)
- Family: Julien Clerc (half-brother)

Gérard Leclerc (2 September 1951 – 15 August 2023) was a French journalist.

== Early life and education ==
Gérard Leclerc was born in Neuilly-sur-Seine on 2 September 1951, as the son of Paul Leclerc and Ghislaine Théry. He earned his Baccalauréat at the Lycée Lakanal in Sceaux followed by studies at University of Paris 1 Panthéon-Sorbonne and Sciences Po. His half-brother is the singer Julien Clerc.

== Personal life and death ==
Leclerc was married to Julie Leclerc in 1981 and had twins and one daughter. On 15 August 2023, he was travelling to attend a concert by his half-brother Julien Clerc in La Baule when his airplane crashed into water in Lavau-sur-Loire. He and Michelle Monory, the daughter of former president of the French Senate René Monory, plus one other person, were killed. He was 71.
