= Joël Dupuch =

Joël Dupuch is a French oyster farmer, restaurateur, author and actor.

== Biography ==
He is a sixth-generation oyster farmer from the Arcachon Bay. He started working in 1973. He has been called "the most famous oyster farmer" in France. He owns Joël D., a restaurant in Bordeaux which specializes in salmon, foie gras and oysters.

Since 2006, he has acted in three feature films. In 2012, he published a book.

== Filmography ==
- Tell No One (dir. Guillaume Canet, 2006).
- Little White Lies (dir. Guillaume Canet, 2010).
- Jappeloup (dir. Christian Duguay, 2013).

== Bibliography ==
- Sur la vague du bonheur (Paris: Editions Michel Lafon, 2012)
