= Véronique Rivière =

French singer-songwriter (born 1959)

- Born: 5 February 1959 (age 67); Suresnes, France
- Genres: Pop, rock
- Occupations: Singer, songwriter
- Instrument: Vocals
- Years active: 1985–present
- Website: http://www.veronique-riviere.com

Véronique Rivière (born Véronique Tartakovsky in Suresnes, 5 February 1959) is a French singer-songwriter.

== Biography ==
Rivière's father is the Russian-French television producer Alexandre Tarta, and her mother is a journalist. She began her career by playing minor acting roles on television, and in 1982, as a cabaret singer at Café de la Gare in Paris.

To date, Rivière has released six studio albums and several singles. From 1991 to 2001, she appeared as a backing vocalist on four albums of Swiss singer Stephan Eicher.

Rivière is currently performing the role of Francesca Lavie, which was previously played by Diane Tell, in the musical Je m'voyais déjà. Written by Laurent Ruquier and directed by Alain Sachs, this production premiered in Paris in 2008 and features the songs of Charles Aznavour.

== Discography ==
=== Albums ===
| Year | Title | Record label |
|---|---|---|
| 2011 | Aquatinte | Edina Music |
| 2005 | Éponyme | Tacet Production/Mosaic Music |
| 1996 | En vert et contre tout | DBF Music/Tréma-Sony |
| 1993 | Mojave | Remark/PolyGram |
| 1989 | Véronique Rivière | Polydor |
| 1987 | Et vice verseau | Phonogram/Philips |

=== Singles ===
| Year | Title | Record label |
|---|---|---|
| 2005 | "Matadors" | Tacet Production/Mosaic Music |
| 1989 | "Tout court" | Polydor |
| 1987 | "A part Ted" | Phonogram/Philips |
| 1986 | "Absence" | PolyGram |
| 1985 | "Si seulement tu voulais monter" | Virgin France |
