= Jappeloup =

- French theatrical release poster
- Directed by: Christian Duguay
- Written by: Guillaume Canet
- Based on: Crin Noir by Karine Devilder
- Produced by: Ludi Boeken; Pascal Judelewicz; Romain Le Grand; Frédérique Dumas; Geneviève Lemal; Chica Benadava; Walid Chammah; Florian Genetet-Morel; Joe Iacono; Lyse Lafontaine
- Starring: Guillaume Canet; Marina Hands; Daniel Auteuil
- Cinematography: Ronald Plante
- Edited by: Richard Marizy
- Music by: Clinton Shorter
- Distributed by: Pathé Distribution (France); Les Films Séville (Canada)
- Release date: 13 March 2013
- Running time: 130 minutes
- Countries: France; Canada
- Language: French
- Budget: $26.7 million
- Box office: $14.8 million

Jappeloup is a 2013 French-language film directed by Christian Duguay. In January 2014, Lou de Laâge was nominated for the Most Promising Actress award at the 39th César Awards.

== Plot ==
In the early 1980s, Pierre Durand, Jr. resigns from his career as a lawyer and becomes a professional equestrian, focusing on show jumping. He purchases Jappeloup de Luze (1975–1991) from Henry Delage.

Durand loses at the 1984 Summer Olympics in Los Angeles, California. However, at the 1988 Summer Olympics in Seoul, South Korea, he wins.

== Cast ==
- Guillaume Canet as Pierre Durand, Jr.
- Marina Hands as Nadia
- Daniel Auteuil as Serge Durand
- Lou de Laâge as Raphaëlle Dalio
  - Sonia Ammar as young Raphaëlle
- Tchéky Karyo as Marcel Rozier
- Jacques Higelin as Dalio
- Marie Bunel as Arlette Durand
- Joël Dupuch as Francis Lebail
- Frédéric Épaud as Patrick Caron
- Arnaud Henriet as Frédéric Cottier
- Donald Sutherland as John Lester
- Antoine Cholet as Hubert Bourdy
- Edmond Jonquères d'Oriola as Philippe Rozier
- Benoît Petitjean as Éric Navet
- Sébastien Cazorla as Michel Robert
- Noah Huntley as Joe Fargis
- James Flynn as John Lester's son
- Xavier Alcan as Sponsor
- Jean Rochefort as himself

== Critical reception ==
It was shown at the COLCOA film festival in Los Angeles, California in 2013.

For The Hollywood Reporter, the film offers "a rather classic mix of stunts and sentiment before galloping ahead to its stirring equine finale."

== See also ==
- List of films about horses
