= Xavier de Moulins =

French journalist, television presenter and author

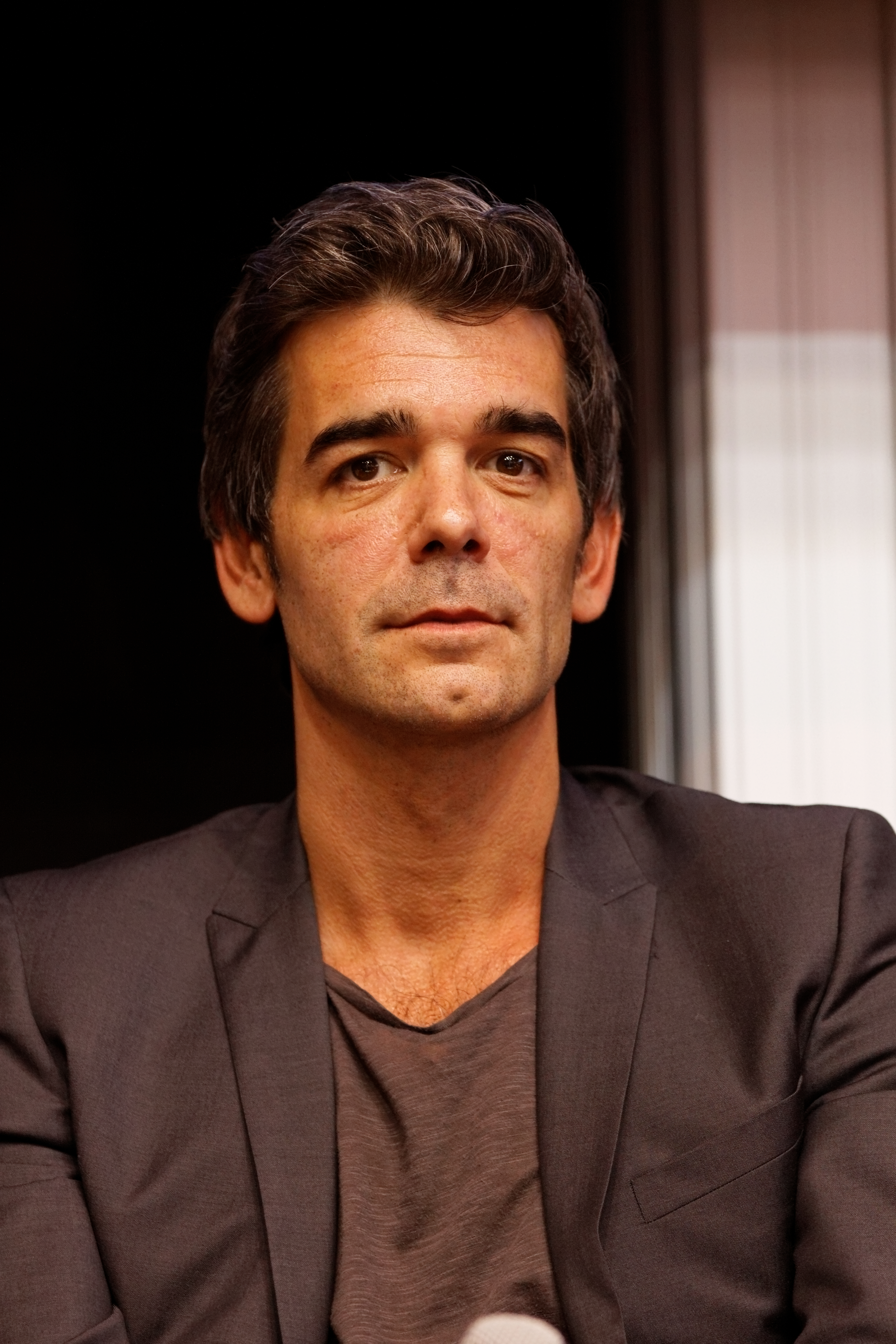
- Xavier de Moulins at the Salon du Livre of Paris in March 2012.
- Born: 5 July 1971 (age 53); Boulogne-Billancourt, Hauts-de-Seine, France
- Occupation(s): Journalist, television presenter, author
- Years active: 1999–present
- Notable credit(s): Le 19:45; 66 le doc 66 minutes 66 le grand format
- Television: Canal+ (1999–2005); Paris Première (2006–10); M6 (2010–present)

Xavier de Moulins (born Xavier de Moulins d'Amieu de Beaufort, 5 July 1971) is a French journalist, television presenter and author.

== Life and career ==
Xavier de Moulins was born in Boulogne-Billancourt in the department of Hauts-de-Seine. After graduating with a hypokhâgne and a khâgne, he graduated with a master's degree in literature at the Paris-Sorbonne University and a DESS (Diplôme d'Études Supérieures Spécialisées) in telecommunications at the Paris Dauphine University.

In 1994, he collaborated at the Guide du routard, after a first reportage for La Croix at the Order of the Friars Minor from the Bronx where he spent three months. He then became a regular stringer for several medias including Le Monde, L'Expansion, Vogue, Les Inrockuptibles and C dans l'air. He appeared for the first time on television in 1999 in the program Nulle part ailleurs.

In 2002, he joined the team of PAF Productions of Marc-Olivier Fogiel, where he made several subjects and portraits for the different programs produced by the company and presented a special section in the program + Clair on Canal+. In 2005, he presented the program Nous ne sommes pas des anges on the same channel with Maïtena Biraben, whom he met on the program Les Maternelles.

From 2006 to 2010, he presented every week the program Paris Dernière on the channel Paris Première, succeeding to Thierry Ardisson and Frédéric Taddeï. In summer 2010, he became one of the replacing presenters of the daily news on M6 titled Le 19:45. He then presented permanently the evening news replacing Claire Barsacq.

On 22 April and 6 May 2012, he presented two special programs for the French presidential election on M6. In September 2012, while still presenting the evening news Le 19:45, he started presenting the program 66 minutes on the same channel.

== Television programs ==
- 1999 : Nulle part ailleurs on Canal+
- 2005 : Nous ne sommes pas des anges on Canal+
- 2006–10 : Paris Dernière on Paris Première
- 2010 : Mon beau miroir on Paris Première
- 2010–present : Le 19:45 on M6
- 2012–present : 66 minutes on M6

== Publications ==
- Au diable vauvert, ed. (2011). Un coup à prendre (in French). ISBN 978-2-84626-285-9.
- Au diable vauvert, ed. (2012). Ce parfait ciel bleu (in French). ISBN 978-2-84626-400-6.
- JC Lattès, ed. (2014). Que ton règne vienne (in French). ISBN 978-2709645744.
- JC Lattès, ed. (2016). Charles Draper (in French). ISBN 978-2709648530.
- JC Lattès, ed. (2017). Les hautes lumières (in French). ISBN 978-2709660594.
