= Maryse Liburdi =

American businesswoman

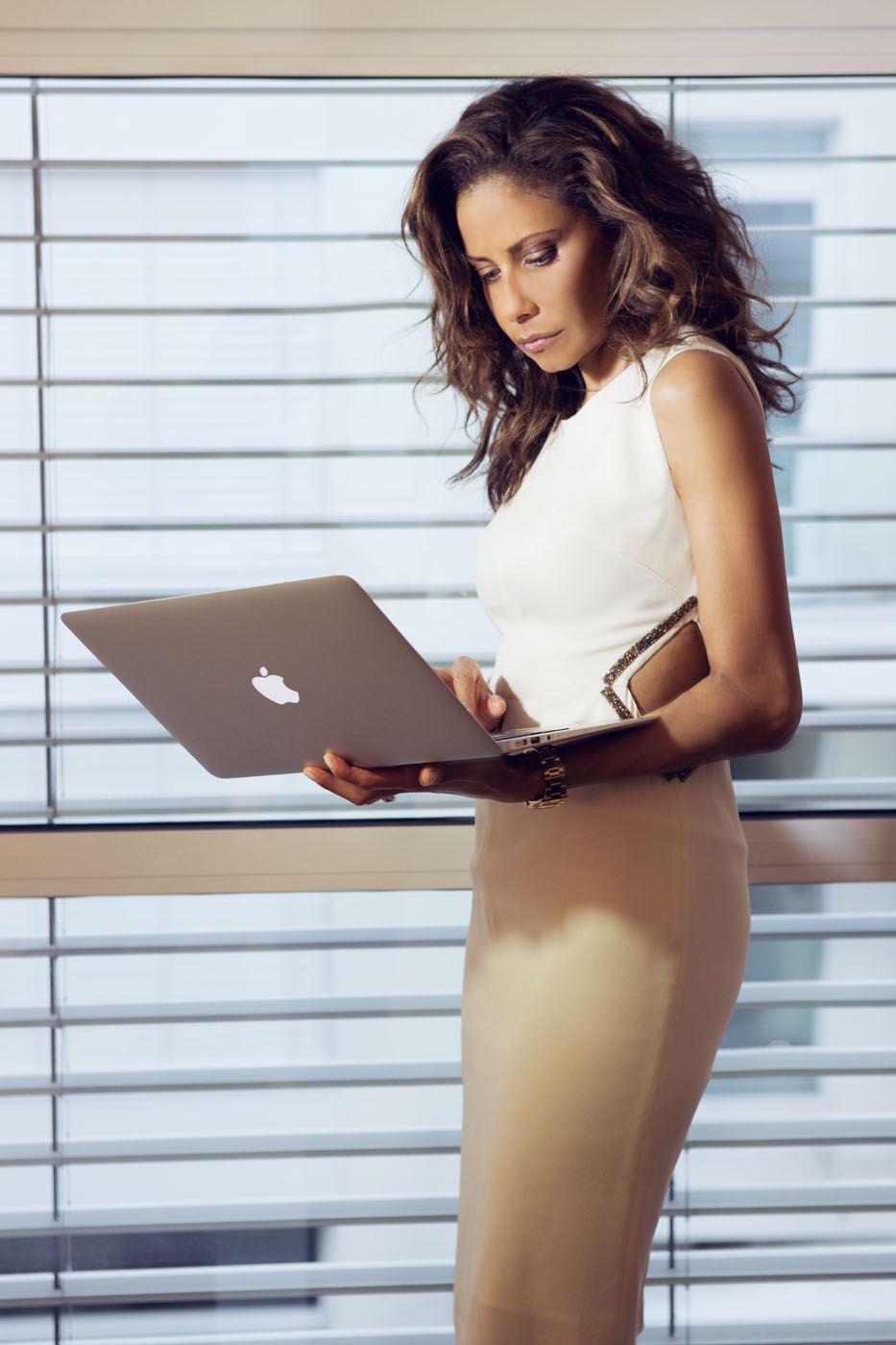
- Maryse Liburdi in 2013
- Occupation(s): Founder & Chief Executive Officer of Pokeware

Maryse Liburdi (formerly Maryse Thomas) is the former chairman and CEO of Pokeware, a technology company and ad exchange she founded in 1997. In September 2017, she was convicted of fraud for having deceived investors about the financial state of the company.

== Other work ==
Liburdi has been an active member of the lobbying organization Technet and has participated in regional events advocating innovation economics. In 2017, it was announced that she was one of the managers of a venture capital fund investing in sub-Saharan Africa tech startups.

== Fraud conviction ==
Liburdi was arrested in April 2016 in Rome, stemming from US charges accused of investor fraud in the range of $25–30 million. In June 2017, she pled guilty of having defrauded investors by falsifying the company's bank accounts, making Pokeware appear to be in better financial condition than it actually was. Over a million dollars in investor money was spent on Liburdi's personal life. On September 29, 2017, Liburdi was sentenced to 49 months in prison, followed by three years of supervised release, and an order to repay the $7 million and to forfeit another $7 million.
