= Diane Tell =

Canadian musician (born Diane Fortin, 1959)

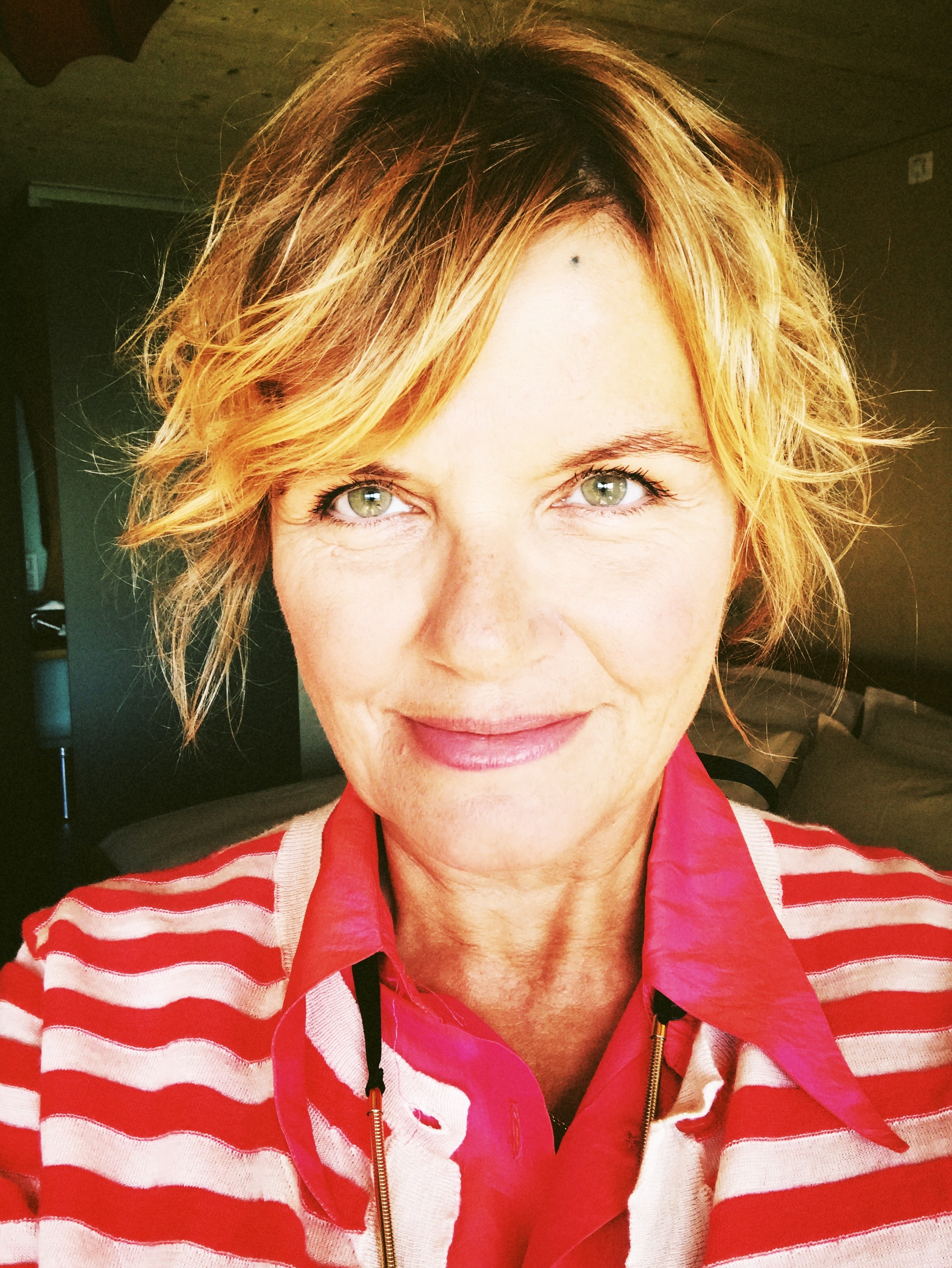

Background information
- Born: Diane Fortin; 24 December 1959 (age 66); Quebec City, Quebec, Canada
- Origin: Quebec City, Quebec, Canada
- Genres: Pop jazz, French pop, indie pop, adult contemporary
- Occupations: Singer-songwriter, guitarist
- Instruments: Vocals, guitar
- Years active: 1977–present
- Label: Tuta Music/IDOL distribution WW
- Website: www.dianetell.com

Diane Tell (born 24 December 1959) is a Canadian musician who was born in Quebec City, Quebec.

Tell entered the Val d’Or conservatory at the age of six. She continued her studies at the Montréal conservatory and then at CEGEP Saint-Laurent, and she wrote her first songs at the age of twelve. As one of Québec's pioneering female singer-songwriters, she showcased her repertoire over the course of her first four albums. She won six Félix prizes before the age of 25: breakout artist, best artist, best album, best song and, twice, songwriter of the year. Several of her songs have become SOCAN Classics and Si j’étais un homme was inducted in the Canadian Songwriters Hall of Fame in 2017. She earned a MIDEM Award for her album Chimères and a Victoire Award for her album Faire à nouveau connaissance.

In 1990, she was chosen by Plamondon, Berger and Savary to play a leading role in the musical La légende de Jimmy. Following that, she played the lead and composed the score for another musical, Marilyn Montreuil, written and stage-directed by Jérôme Savary and the Théâtre National du Chaillot, in Paris. Over 300 performances of both shows were presented in France and Europe. Over the past 25 years, Tell has toured relentlessly, written, composed and recorded in Canada, France, the U.K. and Switzerland. In 2019, she produced her 15th studio album of original material in Montréal. As an independent artist, she owns the phonographic rights of her entire catalogue, manages her own publishing company, and produces and finances her albums herself. Also a photographer, she directs the majority of her music videos.

In May 2018, Tell was elected to SOCAN's (The Society of Composers, Authors and Music Publishers of Canada) Board of Directors for a 3-year mandate. She was re-elected in 2021 to a second mandate.

On 15 July 2022 in Paris, Madame Rima Abdul Malak, French Minister of Culture, awarded Tell, as part of the Spring 2022 class, the rank of Chevalier de l'ordre des Arts et des Lettres, one of the main distinctions of the four ministerial orders of the French Republic.

In 2024, Tell was inducted into the Canadian Songwriters Hall of Fame.

== Discography ==
- 1977: Diane Tell
- 1979: Entre nous
- 1980: En flèche
- 1982: Chimères
- 1984: On a besoin d'amour
- 1986: Faire à nouveau connaissance
- 1988: Dégriffe-moi
- 1990: La légende de Jimmy
- 1991: Marilyn Montreuil
- 1993: Morceaux choisis
- 1996: Désir Plaisir Soupir
- 2003: Tout de Diane (compilation)
- 2005: Popeline
- 2009: Diane Tell Original Album Classics (5-CD set)
- 2009: Docteur Boris & Mister Vian
- 2011: Rideaux Ouverts
- 2013: Une
- 2013: Passe Simple (Best of)
- 2014: Ne me quitte pas : Un hommage à Jacques Brel (multi-artistes québécois)
- 2015: Intemporelle Diane Dufresne (multi-artistes québécois)
- 2015: Duos Félix Leclerc (multi-artistes québécois)
- 2019: Haïku

== Awards ==
- Félix best singer-songwriter (1980) Quebec
- Félix best new artist (1980)
- Félix best song for "Si j'étais un homme" (1981)
- Félix best album En Flèche (1981)
- Félix best singer-songwriter (1981)
- Félix best female artist (1981)
- Juno Awards, nomination, most promising female vocalist (1984) Canada
- Midem Awards best female artist (1982) France
- Victoire de la musique best francophone album Faire à nouveau connaissance (1986) France
- Classics SOCAN - Gilberto, Si j'étais un homme, Miami, Savoir, Faire à nouveau connaissance... +
- SPACQ - PRIX ROBERT CHARLEBOIS – Rayonnement international (2015)
- "Si j'étais un homme" Inducted Canadian Songwriters Hall of fame (2017)

== Live performances (selection) ==
- 1977 Bigins at l'Évêché Montreal
- 1980 La Place des Arts Montreal
- 1982 Le Théâtre Saint-Denis Montreal
- 1983 L'Olympia Paris
- 1986 L'Olympia Paris
- 1989 L'Olympia Paris
- 1996 Le Spectrum Montreal
- 2003 Le Palais Royal Paris
- 2003 Les FrancoFolies de Montréal Club Soda Montreal
- 2003 Le Théâtre du Petit Champlain, Quebec
- 2005 Les FrancoFolies de Montréal Spectrum Montreal
- 2005 Le Cabaret Music-Hall à Montréal and touring En Solo mais pas Single
- 2005 Le Grand Théâtre de Québec Quebec
- 2006 L'Européen Paris
- 2010 Les FrancoFolies de Montréal La Place des Arts Montreal
- 2012 Les FrancoFolies de Montréal La grande scène Montreal
- 2012 Tournée du ROSEQ Qué, N.B. /Canada
- 2013 : Ne me quitte pas, Hommage à Jacques Brel - Festival de Tadoussac, FrancoFolies de Montréal CA
- 2013 : Série de concerts en Europe et au Canada, en Solo, en Duo (avec Robbie McIntosh), avec Vincent Réhel et le Quatuor à Cordes Hermès
- 2014 : Ne me quitte pas, Hommage à Jacques Brel - en Tournée au Québec CA
- 2014 : Série de concerts en Europe et au Canada, en Solo, en Duo (avec Robbie McIntosh)
- 2014 : Festival de Jazz de Montréal avec Vincent Réhel et les Mommies on the Run CA
- 2015 : Ne me quitte pas, Hommage à Jacques Brel - En tournée au Québec et au Festival Montréal en Lumières (Salle Wilfried Pelletier de la Place des Arts) CA
- 2016 : Printemps de Pérouges FR, en duo avec Robbie McIntosh
- 2017 : Ne me quitte pas, Hommage à Jacques Brel - Avec l'Orchestre Symphonique de Montréal (Maison Symphonique de la Place des Arts) Montréal Qué. CA
- 2017 : Le Baladin de Savièse CH, en duo avec Robbie McIntosh
- 2017 : Pan Piper (Paris FR)
- 2018 : Nuit du jazz, Chernex-sur-Montreux CH
- 2021 - 2022 : 40 concerts tour in Canada - Bonsound and Tuta Music Tour.

== Musicals ==
- 1990: La légende de Jimmy, Théâtre Mogador, Paris by Michel Berger and Luc Plamondon.
- 1991: Marilyn Montreuil (actrice and composer), Théâtre national de Chaillot, Paris by Jérôme Savary and Diane Tell
- 2008: Je m'voyais déjà, Théâtre du Gymnase, Paris by Laurent Ruquier, songs by Charles Aznavour
