= Natacha Polony =

French journalist and essayist (born 1975)

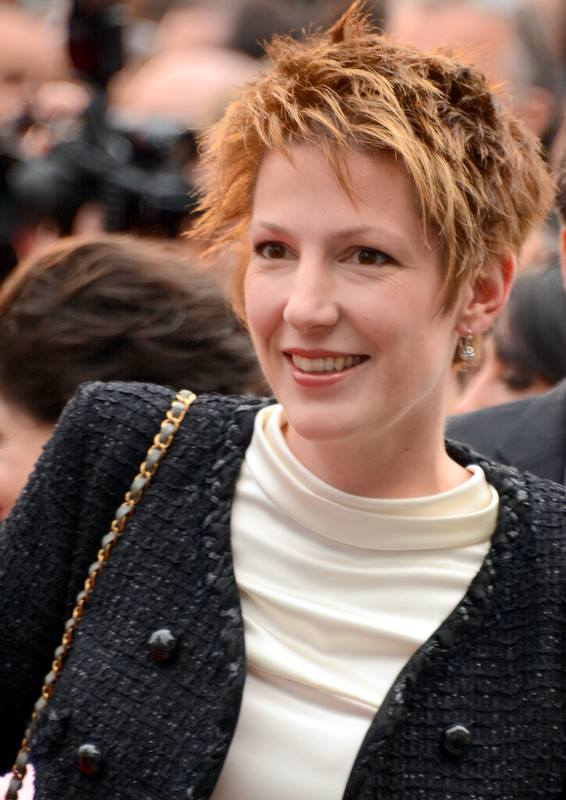
- Polony at the 2015 Cannes Film Festival
- Born: 15 April 1975 (age 51); 14th arrondissement of Paris, France
- Education: Sciences Po
- Occupations: Journalist, essayist
- Television: On n'est pas couché (2011–2014); Le Grand Journal (2014–2015)
- Spouse: Périco Légasse (m. 2007)
- Awards: Prix Richelieu (2016)

Natacha Polony (French pronunciation: [nataʃa pɔlɔni]; born 15 April 1975) is a French journalist, essayist and public intellectual. She notably appeared on the France 2 television show On n'est pas couché, hosted by Laurent Ruquier, from 2011 until 2014. From 2015 to 2017 she hosted Polonium on Paris Première and later was the editor-in-chief of the newspaper Marianne from 2018 to 2025. In 2025, she founded the journal L'Audace.

In French media Polony has long defended French sovereigntism. She has also called for a profound transformation of the European Union to protect its citizens against "imperialist nations" such as the United States, Russia, and China. On 14 October 2026 she announced her candidacy in the 2027 French presidential election.

== Early life ==
Polony grew up in Montmorency, a Parisian suburb in Val-d'Oise. She graduated from Sciences Po in 2002. She supported Jean-Pierre Chevènement in the 2002 French presidential election and ran in the subsequent legislative election in Paris's 9th constituency, placing sixth in the first round with 2.24% of the vote.

Later in 2002, she joined Marianne as a journalist. In 2009 she joined Le Figaro.

== Personal life ==
Polony is of Polish origin. She was named after the character of Natasha Rostova in Tolstoy's War and Peace. In 2007 she married journalist, food critic and politician Périco Légasse.

Polony and her husband have 3 children: Eneko (born in 2007), Cosima (born in 2011), and Bartolomé (born in 2013).

== Bibliography ==
- Nos Enfants gâchés : petit traité sur la fracture générationnelle, Éditions Jean-Claude Lattès, 2005.
- M(me) le président, si vous osiez... : 15 mesures pour sauver l’école, Éditions Mille et une nuits, 2007.
- L'Homme est l'avenir de la femme, Éditions Jean-Claude Lattès, 2008.
- Preface of Autopsie du mammouth by Claire Mazeron, Éditions Jean-Claude Gawsewitch, 2010.
- École : le pire est de plus en plus sûr, Éditions Mille et une nuits, 2011.
- Ce pays qu'on abat. Chroniques 2009-2014, Plon, 2014.
- Nous sommes la France, Plon, 2015.
- Chrétiens français ou français chrétiens (with Fabrice Hadjadj and Paul Préaux), Salvator, 2017.
- Changer la vie : pour une reconquête démocratique, Éditions de l'Observatoire, 2017.
- Délivrez-nous du Bien ! Halte aux nouveaux inquisiteurs with Jean-Michel Quatrepoint, Éditions de l'Observatoire, 2018.
- Sommes-nous encore en démocratie ?, Éditions de l'Observatoire, 2021.
- La France. Corps et âme, Plon, 2026.
