= Maryse =

Maryse is a given name. Notable persons with this name include:

- Maryse Alberti, cinematographer
- Maryse Bergé-Lavigne, teacher and politician
- Maryse Condé, author
- Maryse Dauvray, actress
- Maryse Lassonde, neuropsychologist
- Maryse Liburdi (formerly Maryse Thomas), CEO
- Maryse Marpsat, sociologist
- Maryse Joissains-Masini (formerly Maryse Charton), politician
- Maryse Mitsouko, actress
- Maryse Mizanin (formerly Maryse Ouellet), professional wrestler
- Maryse Warda, translator

== Other uses ==
- Maryse or Maurice, a type of cooking spatula
