= Julie Leclerc =

French radio and television host

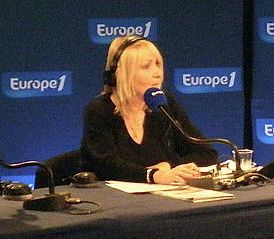
- Leclerc in 2009
- Born: Chantal Séloron; 11 July 1945 (age 81); Saint-Étienne, France
- Occupations: Radio and TV host
- Employer: Europe 1
- Spouse: Gérard Leclerc (m. 1981; died 2023)

Julie Leclerc (born Chantal Séloron, 11 July 1945) is a French radio and television host.

== Career ==
Leclerc was born in Saint-Étienne. Her father was an engineer and her mother a housewife. She studied in Lyon where she obtained a degree in art history.

After a season at RMC where she hosted the Julien et Julie show alongside Thierry Le Luron and Julien Lepers, she became one of the "voices" of Europe 1 radio station. Although she was replaced by Céline Da Costa in 2018, she remains Nicolas Canteloup's voice partner during his columns.

== Private life ==
She was married to journalist Gérard Leclerc from 1981 until his death in a plane crash in August 2023.
