= Little White Lies (2010 film) =

2010 film by Guillaume Canet

- Theatrical release poster
- Directed by: Guillaume Canet
- Written by: Guillaume Canet
- Produced by: Alain Attal
- Starring: François Cluzet; Marion Cotillard; Benoît Magimel; Gilles Lellouche; Jean Dujardin; Laurent Lafitte; Valérie Bonneton; Pascale Arbillot
- Cinematography: Christophe Offenstein
- Edited by: Hervé De Luze
- Music by: Various
- Production companies: Les Productions du Trésor; EuropaCorp
- Distributed by: EuropaCorp Distribution
- Release dates: 11 September 2010 (TIFF); 20 October 2010 (France)
- Running time: 154 minutes
- Country: France
- Language: French
- Budget: $17.6 million
- Box office: $53.3 million

Little White Lies (French: Les Petits Mouchoirs) is a 2010 French comedy-drama film written and directed by Guillaume Canet. The ensemble cast stars François Cluzet, Marion Cotillard, Benoît Magimel, Gilles Lellouche, Jean Dujardin, Laurent Lafitte, Valérie Bonneton and Pascale Arbillot. It was released theatrically in France by EuropaCorp on 20 October 2010. The film grossed $53.3 million worldwide on a $17.6 million budget; selling 6.4 million tickets in Europe, with 5.2 million tickets sold in France. A sequel titled Little White Lies 2 was released in 2019.

== Plot ==
On leaving a Paris nightclub late at night, Ludo (Jean Dujardin) rides away on his scooter and is broadsided by a speeding truck that ran a red light. Lying between life and death in the hospital, Ludo is visited by his band of longtime friends, who decide that the gruesome crash should not prevent them from embarking on their summer holidays.

Prior to the trip, another major problem arises when one of the friends, osteopath Vincent (Benoît Magimel), confesses his attraction to restaurateur Max (François Cluzet). Both are married, and Max clearly is not interested, so when they arrive later with their families at his seaside cottage, tension is high. The group's stress level is further increased by pot-smoking rebel Marie (Marion Cotillard), lovesick actor Eric (Gilles Lellouche) and the even more lovesick Antoine (Laurent Lafitte), all of whom are suffering from failed or failing relationships.

== Cast ==
- François Cluzet as Max Cantara
- Marion Cotillard as Marie
- Benoît Magimel as Vincent Ribaud
- Gilles Lellouche as Eric
- Jean Dujardin as Ludo
- Laurent Lafitte as Antoine
- Valérie Bonneton as Véronique Cantara
- Pascale Arbillot as Isabelle Ribaud
- Louise Monot as Lea
- Anne Marivin as Juliette
- Joël Dupuch as Jean-Louis
- Hocine Mérabet as Nassim
- Maxim Nucci as Franck
- Paula Garcia as Paola

== Production ==
=== Development ===
The script took five months to write. The cast lived for three days in May 2009 at the house which would be used as a principal filming location, so it would feel familiar to them when they returned in the summer.

The French title Les Petits Mouchoirs translates as "the small handkerchiefs". It refers to a French expression mettre dans sa poche avec son mouchoir par-dessus, which means "to put something in your pocket with your handkerchief on top of it", in other words, to keep something hidden, try to forget about it, not want to think about it.

=== Filming ===
The film began production in August 2009 and ended in October. The shooting took place in Paris and Cap Ferret.

== Release ==
The film premiered at the 2010 Toronto International Film Festival. It was released in France on 20 October 2010 through EuropaCorp Distribution, who launched it on over 550 screens.

== Reception ==
=== Critical response ===
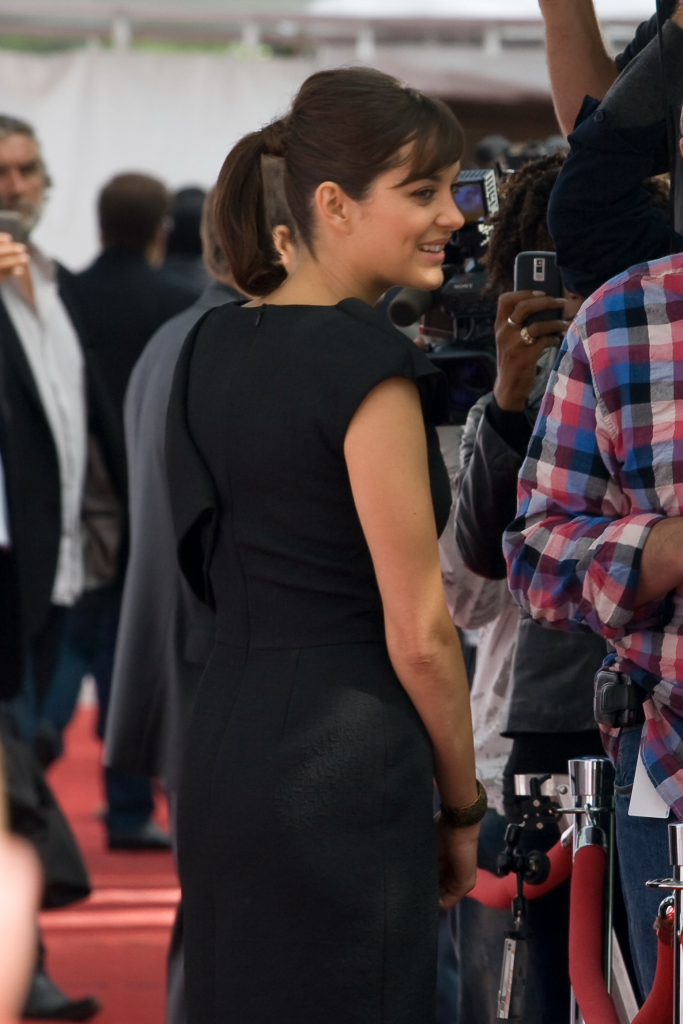
Marion Cotillard at the Toronto International Film Festival for the premiere of the film.

The film received mixed reviews. On the review aggregator website Rotten Tomatoes, 42% of 71 critics' reviews are positive, with an average rating of 5.8/10. The website's consensus reads: "Little White Lies luxuriates in the company of its impressive cast and small-scale dilemmas to its detriment, yielding a comedy of initial charm that meanders into boredom." AlloCiné, a French cinema website, gave the film an average rating of 2.9/5, based on a survey of 26 French reviews.

Roger Ebert gave the film three and a half stars out of four, remarking, "The American film that comes to mind is The Big Chill [...] It is the oyster fisherman who finally regards them all and presents the plain-spoken truth. What he says was waiting for someone to say. Joel Dupuch says it so well I hope he acts again. He has the presence. There are times when Little White Lies seems to meander, until we realize it knows exactly where it is going."

The film was panned by Philippe Azoury of Libération, who thought it was too long, strangely cast, and that all of its female characters were stereotypes. Le Parisien's Marie Sauvion was more ambivalent and divided the review in a pros and a cons section. The pros were that she found the genre in itself sympathetic, and how the film manages to use individual scenes to give the viewer a feeling of participation and shared enjoyment. On the negative side, she thought it was too unsubtle and predictable, and uses too much music to intensify emotional scenes, "In case we didn't understand when to be moved?"

=== Box office ===
The film debuted at number one at the French box office and grossed $53.3 million worldwide. It sold 6.4 million tickets in Europe, with 5.2 million tickets sold in France.

== Music ==
The music in the film is mainly American with English lyrics.

Title	Artist
Are You Gonna Be My Girl	Jet
This Old Heart of Mine (Is Weak for You)	Isley Brothers
Bonjour Jeanne	Joël Dupuch
Fortunate Sun	Creedence Clearwater Revival
Coldwater	Damien Rice
FAIXA	Aldeia Capoto
Welcome to the Lounge	Gianni Ferro
The Weight	The Band
Moonage Daydream	David Bowie
Talk to Me	Maxim Nucci
If Were Your Woman	Gladys Knight & the Pips
Hang On Sloopy	The McCoys
To be True	Maxim Nucci
Holding Out for a Hero	Bonnie Tyler
That Look You Gave That Guy	Eels
Fistful of Love	Antony & The Johnsons
Kozmic Blues	Janis Joplin
Amen Omen	Ben Harper
My Way	Nina Simone
Crucify Your Mind	Sixto Rodriguez

== Sequel ==
A sequel titled Little White Lies 2 was released in 2019.
