= Almost Legal =

- Theatrical release poster
- French: Presque Légal
- Directed by: Max Mauroux
- Written by: Max Mauroux
- Produced by: Sidonie Dumas
- Starring: Marley Duboscq; Joseph Pierre; Léo Castell; Marie-Anne Chazel; Sawsan Abès; François Levantal; Olivier Marchal; Joaquim Fossi; Jérôme Niel; Jean-Claude Muaka; Manel Benyoucef
- Cinematography: Thomas Brémond
- Edited by: Basile Belkhiri
- Music by: Milan Kanche-Daudin
- Production company: Gaumont
- Distributed by: Gaumont
- Release dates: 18 January 2024 (L'Alpe d'Huez Film Festival); 17 July 2024 (France and Belgium)
- Running time: 82 minutes
- Country: France
- Language: French
- Budget: €5,840,000
- Box office: €258,000

Almost Legal (French: Presque Légal) is a 2024 French teen comedy film written and directed by Max Mauroux in his feature directorial debut. The film, which features young actors with a few prior credits in the lead roles and big names such as Marie-Anne Chazel, François Levantal, Olivier Marchal and Jérôme Niel in supporting roles, concerns a couple of slackers in the Arcachon Bay who decide to break in to a small grocery store at night and operate it as a night-time business, selling alcohol to vacationers during the summer. It was released theatrically in France and Belgium on 17 July 2024 after premiering at the L'Alpe d'Huez Film Festival earlier in the year. It was poorly received by critics and has grossed about €258,000 thus far.

== Cast ==
- Marley Duboscq as Félix
- Joseph Pierre as Vincent
- Léo Castell as Léo
- Marie-Anne Chazel as Yvette
- Sawsan Abès as Marie-Lou
- François Levantal as Patrick
- Olivier Marchal as Father
- Joaquim Fossi as Jean-Benoît
- Jérôme Niel as Guillaume
- Jean-Claude Muaka as Antoine
- Manel Benyoucef as Elie

== Production ==
The film went through the working title Les Nouveaux Patrons (literally The New Bosses). Filming began on 15 May 2023 and lasted 33 days until June, mainly in Arcachon, where first time writer/director Max Mauroux is from, and surrounding areas such as Bordeaux and La Teste-de-Buch. The film is an adaptation of Mauroux's short film Danemark and went through test screenings during the editing process.

== Release ==
The film had its world premiere on 18 January 2024 in competition at the L'Alpe d'Huez Film Festival. It then received a special screening at the Festival du Film de Demain in Vierzon on the 1st of June followed by premieres in Villenave-d'Ornon and La Teste-de-Buch, both on the 3rd of July before receiving a wide theatrical release in France by Gaumont on 282 screens and Belgium by Athena Films on 17 July 2024. It was rated for all audiences in France and for over 12 year olds in Belgium due to alcohol and/or drug use in the film. International sales are handled by Gaumont.

=== Marketing ===
The film's trailer was released on 30 May 2024.

=== Home media ===
The film is set to be released on DVD in France by Gaumont on 20 November 2024.

== Reception ==
=== Box office ===
As of 7 August 2024, Almost Legal sold 35,570 movie tickets in France, grossing around €258,000. (Note: Based on the national average €7.24 ticket price)

In its first week, the film debuted at number 14 at the box office, selling 25,683 tickets with an average of 3 spectators per showing, well below fellow new releases Twisters (debuting at number 4), King of My Castle (6) and Santosh (10), but above The Trouble with Jessica at number 15. In its second week, Almost Legal sold 7,953 tickets, a 69% drop compared to the previous week, and was out of the Top 20 weekly box office. It plummeted an additional 76% in its third week, with 1,934 tickets sold.

=== Critical response ===
The film was poorly received by critics, with an average 2 out of 5 stars reception aggregated on AlloCiné based on 3 reviews.

Clément Canaux wrote a positive review for Ma Chaîne Étudiante, noting the chemistry between the cast, the breezy humor, the endearing characters, the film's pacing and its beautiful scenery, highlighting the performances of Sawsan Abès and Jérôme Niel in particular.

In an average review for Sud Ouest, Stéphane C. Jonathan praised Milan Kanche-Daudin's original score and compared the film favorably to the American comedies Superbad and Clerks.

Meanwhile Yohan Haddad in Télérama branded the film a "total fiasco" with "not much to save".

Europe 1's Solène Delinger chose not to write a review for the film, the journalist instead putting out a glowing review of Sawsan Abès' performance in it, calling her the "revelation of 2024".

=== Accolades ===
List of awards and nominations for Almost Legal
Award or film festival	Date of ceremony	Category	Recipient(s)	Result	Ref.
L'Alpe d'Huez Film Festival	20 January 2024	Grand Prix	Max Mauroux	Nominated	
