= Le Grand Journal (French TV program) =

French TV program

- Created by: Renaud Le Van Kim; Michel Denisot
- Presented by: Victor Robert (2016–2017) Maïtena Biraben (2015–2016) Antoine de Caunes (2013–2015); Daphné Bürki (2012–2013); Michel Denisot (2004–2013)
- Country of origin: France
- No. of episodes: 1,028

Production
- Production locations: Studios Rive Gauche; Paris, France (2004–2015) Canal Factory (Plateau B) Boulogne, France (2015–2017)
- Running time: 60 minutes

Original release
- Network: Canal+
- Release: August 30, 2004 – March 3, 2017

Le Grand Journal is a French nightly news and talk show television program that aired on Canal+ every weekday evening from 19:10 to 20:20. It debuted on August 30, 2004 and was created and hosted by Michel Denisot, succeeded by Antoine de Caunes and then later by Maïtena Biraben. Victor Robert took on the reins from 2016 to the program's end in 2017. Originally a one-hour program, it expanded to two hours in 2005. Even though the program was broadcast on the premium channel Canal+, it was a non-encrypted program.

The program features news, talk, weather and comedy. It is produced by KM Productions for Canal+ and broadcast from the Studios Rive Gauche on Quai André-Citroën in Paris.

== History ==
Created in 2004 by producer-director Renaud Le Van Kim, the show was originally composed of one block broadcast from 19:05 to 19:55, usually live except on Fridays. The show benefitted from audiences from all of Canal+'s free time slots watching, in addition to the extension of Digital terrestrial television, which allowed new households access to the channel. The show took up the time slot initially reserved for the show 20 h 10 pétantes (French for "20:10 sharp") at the beginning of the 2005 season; Since then, Stéphanie Bern's show has only been diffused on Fridays and Saturdays, under the name Vendredi pétantes et Samedi pétantes. The second part was then titled Le Grand Journal, la suite and was broadcast from 20:10 to 20:40. Since September 2011, La Suite was broadcast from 20:30 to 20:55.

During season 9, La Suite was copresented by Michel Denisot and Daphné Bürki. The show lost 13% of their audience, which it blamed on the fact that it was played at the same time as C à vous on France 5, Vous êtes en direct on NRJ 12, and Touche pas à mon poste on D8.

On June 6, 2013, Michel Denisot announced that he would quit the show after 9 years at the head of the talk-show. On June 17, 2013, the name of the new presenter was announced to be Antoine de Caunes. He was a former presenter on Canal+ from 1987 to 1995 participating in the success of the show Nulle part ailleurs then at the César Award presentation ceremony.

At the beginning of February 2017, a press conference had stated that the program might possibly stop production on March or April due to a decline in ratings, and that the leaders of Canal + would already be working on the successor to LGJ. The channel announced its final run on Friday 13 February, followed by two weeks of reruns until March 17.

== Team ==
Legend:
Currently
Previously
Invited during one or multiple broadcasts
Joker a broadcast

Animator	Role	Seasons												
Animator	Role	1 (2004–05)	2 (2005–06)	3 (2006–07)	4 (2007–08)	5 (2008–09)	6 (2009–10)	7 (2010–11)	8 (2011–12)	9 (2012–13)	10 (2013–14)	11 (2014–15)	12 (2015–16)	13 (2016–17)
Victor Robert	Présentateur vedette													
André Manoukian	Music													
Élé Asu	News													
Ornella Fleury	Weather													
Axelle Laffont	Humor Column													
Alice Darfeuille	News													
Augustin Trapenard	Literary Column													
Lauren Bastide	Pop Culture													
Victor Robert	News													
Maïtena Biraben	Présentatrice vedette										Joker			
Antoine de Caunes	Présentateur vedette													
Jean-Michel Aphatie	Political													
Natacha Polony	Political													
Cyrille Eldin	Political													
Raphaëlle Dupire	Weather, and Le Rappel Dupire													
Sébastien Thoen	Humor Column									♦				
Mathilde Serrell	Culture											♦		
Karim Rissouli	Political Column										♦			
Jérôme Niel	Humor Column										♦			
Monsieur Poulpe	Humor Column										♦			
Vanessa Guide	Humor Column										♦			
Alison Wheeler	Humor Column and joker of Vanessa Guide											♦		
Isabelle Morini-Bosc	Television	♦												
Stéphane Blakowski	Literature	♦												
Laurent Weil	Cinema, and Cannes	♦				invited								
Marie Drucker	The flash info	♦												
Mademoiselle Agnès	Fashion	♦												
Éric Dahan	Music	♦												
Alexandre Cammas	Leisure art de vivre(art of living)	♦												
Guy Birenbaum	La revue de presse(Press review)	♦												
Frédérique Bel	The minute blonde	♦								invited				
Frédéric Beigbeder	Literature		♦		invited				invited					
La bande à Fifi	L'anniversaire		♦											
Arnaud Tsamere	Weather		♦											
Louise Bourgoin	Weather, and sans prétention			♦						invited				
Max Boublil	Le Dating				♦									
Didier Allouch	Cinema market				invited									
Élise Chassaing	Cinema					♦			invited					
Guillaume Gallienne	Les bonus de Guillaume					♦				invited				
Pauline Lefèvre	Weather					♦				invited				
Marie Colmant	La revue de presse internationale(the international press review)					♦								
Anne Sinclair	Politics during the 2008 American election					invited								
Laurence Haïm	Politics during the 2008 American election					invited								
Ali Baddou	Literature (Joker of Denisot)				♦				Joker					
Tania Bruna-Rosso	Music, L'instant T		♦											
Thomas N'Gijol	Le Top 5, and news commentator			♦				♦		invited				
Yann Barthès	Le Petit Journal	♦								invited				
Lucienne Moreau	Reporter for Le Petit Journal							invited						
Charlotte Le Bon	Weather, and L'envers du décor							♦		invited				
Alex Lutz	L'envers du décor								♦					
Stéphane Bak	Sketch à Cannes								invited					
Ariane Massenet	Medias		♦							invited				
Omar and Fred	The SAV des émissions			♦						inviteds				
Kyan Khojandi	Bref								♦	invited				
China Moses	Music								♦					
10 minutes à perdre (to lose)	La Question de la fin									♦				
Nawell Madani	"encore inconnu"									♦				
Mouloud Achour	Le Daily Mouloud then Chez Mouloud					♦								
Michel Denisot	Présentateur vedette	♦												
Vincent Glad	The Web								♦					
Alice Belaïdi	Sophie et Sophie									♦				
Clémence Faure	Sophie et Sophie									♦				
Kamel Boutayeb	Le Tour de Magie						♦							
Daphné Bürki	Co-animator									♦				
Chris Esquerre	Le Bilan de la Semaine									♦				
Bruno Donnet	La petite semaine puis Le Petit Mot		♦											
Solweig Rediger-Lizlow	Weather								♦					
Doria Tillier	Weather									♦				
Ollivier Pourriol	Culture and literature								♦					
Jeannette Bougrab	Columnist										♦			
Arié Elmaleh	Humor sketch artist										♦			
Damien Cabrespines	L'instant critique puis Le Crash Test				♦									
Anne Nivat	Columnist										♦			
Hélène Jouan	Columnist										♦			

== Seasons ==
=== Season 1 (2004–2005) ===
From Monday to Friday at 6:50 pm to 7:55 pm

- Isabelle Morini-Bosc : television
- Stéphane Blakowski : literature
- Laurent Weil : cinema
- Marie Drucker : flash informations
- Mademoiselle Agnès : fashion
- Eric Dahan : music
- Alexandre Cammas : Leisure and art of living
- Guy Birenbaum : press review
- Yann Barthès : Le Petit Journal People
- Ahmed Meguini Global Justice Chronicle
- Frédérique Bel : La minute blonde by Dorothy Doll

=== Season 2 (2005–2006) ===
From Monday to Thursday from 7:10 pm to 7:50 pm and the rest from 8:10 pm to 8:50 pm

- Ariane Massenet : médias
- Frédéric Beigbeder : literature
- Laurent Weil : cinema
- Tania Bruna-Rosso : music
- Yann Barthès : Le Petit Journal Actu and Le Petit Journal People
- Atmen Kelif
- Bruno Donnet : Le Petit papier
- Frédérique Bel : La minute blonde by Dorothy Doll
- L'anniversaire par La bande à Fifi
- Arnaud Tsamere : Weather

=== Season 3 (2006–2007) ===
From Monday to Friday from 7:10 pm to 7:50 pm and the rest from 8:10 pm to 8:50 pm

- Ariane Massenet : medias
- Frédéric Beigbeder : literature who quit the team in May 2007
- Laurent Weil : cinema
- Tania Bruna-Rosso : music
- Jean-Michel Aphatie : Politics
- Yann Barthès : Le Petit Journal Actu and Le Petit Journal People
- Omar and Fred : Le Service après-vente des émissions
- Bruno Donnet : Le Petit papier
- Thomas N'Gijol : Le Top 5
- Louise Bourgoin : Weather
- La bande à Fifi : L'anniversaire

=== Season 4 (2007–2008) ===
From Monday to Friday from 7:10 pm to 7:50 pm and the rest from 8:10 pm to 8:50 pm

- Ariane Massenet : medias
- Ali Baddou : literature
- Laurent Weil : cinema
- Tania Bruna-Rosso : music
- Jean-Michel Aphatie : politic
- Yann Barthès : Le Petit Journal Actu and Le Petit Journal People where he now directly intervenes.
- Omar and Fred : Le Service après-vente des émissions
- Bruno Donnet : La Petite Question and La Petite semaine
- Thomas N'Gijol : top 5
- Le Dating de Max Boublil (September 2007)
- Louise Bourgoin : weather
- Damien Cabrespines : Cinema (" L'instant critique ") and subjects
- Frédéric Beigbeder (only at Cannes For the Film Festival) : cinema
- Didier Allouch (only at Cannes For the Film Festival) : Market of Cinema

=== Season 5 (2008–2009) ===
From Monday to Friday from 7:05 pm to 7:50 pm and the rest from 8:10 pm to 8:45 pm

- Ariane Massenet : Medias
- Jean-Michel Aphatie : Politics
- Louise Bourgoin : Without pretension on Friday and some sketches in "Les bonus de Guillaume”
- Ali Baddou : Literature and culture
- Yann Barthès : Le Petit Journal Actu and Le Petit Journal People, both are live.
- Damien Cabrespines : Cinema (" L'instant critique ") and subjects
- Élise Chassaing : Cinema
- Guillaume Gallienne : Les bonus de Guillaume
- Tania Bruna-Rosso : Music, La Bataille Musicale (avec Mouloud, le vendredi)
- Mouloud Achour : The new movements, La Bataille Musicale (avec Tania, le vendredi)
- Omar and Fred : Le Service après-vente des émissions
- Pauline Lefèvre : Weather
- Bruno Donnet : La Petite Question and La Petite Semaine
- Marie Colmant : International Press Review (Fridays)
- Anne Sinclair and Laurence Haïm Did equal parties for the team during the American Presidential Elections
- Frédéric Beigbeder (only at Cannes For the Film Festival) : cinema
- Laurent Weil (only at Cannes For the Film Festival) : Red Carpet

=== Season 6 (2009–2010) ===
From Monday to Friday from 7:05 pm to 7:50 pm and the rest from 8:10 pm to 8:45 pm

- Ariane Massenet : Medias
- Jean-Michel Aphatie : Politics
- Ali Baddou : Literature and culture
- Pauline Lefèvre : Weather
- Yann Barthès : Le Petit Journal Actu and Le Petit Journal People, both are live.
- Élise Chassaing : Cinema
- Guillaume Gallienne : Les bonus de Guillaume
- Tania Bruna-Rosso : Music
- Mouloud Achour : The new movements
- Damien Cabrespines : Cinema ("L'instant critique")
- Omar and Fred : The Service après-vente des émissions
- Kamel Boutayeb : Le tour de Magie
- Bruno Donnet : La Petite Question and La Petite Semaine
- Laurent Weil (only at Cannes For the Film Festival) : Red Carpet

=== Season 7 (2010–2011) ===
From Monday to Friday from 7:05 pm to 7:50 pm and the rest from 8:10 pm to 8:45 pm

- Ariane Massenet : Médias, Le Bureau de l'Info
- Jean-Michel Aphatie : Politics
- Ali Baddou : Literature and culture (of the rubric Ali a lu), official joker officiel of Michel Denisot
- Charlotte Le Bon : Weather
- Tania Bruna-Rosso : Music, L'Instant T (review of the latest buzz and pop-culture)
- Mouloud Achour : The latest movements, Daily Mouloud (incongruous review of a personality)
- Yann Barthès : Le Petit Journal (only in the first, longer, part)
- Damien Cabrespines : Le Crash Test
- Thomas N'Gijol : Humorous comments on political news of the week. (Only on Friday)
- Omar and Fred : The Service après-vente des émissions
- Kamel Boutayeb : Le tour de Magie
- Bruno Donnet : La Petite Semaine and Rédacteur en Chef
- Lucienne Moreau : Reporter au Petit Journal
- Laurent Weil (only at Cannes For the Film Festival) and for the deliver of the César Awards) : red carpet

=== Season 8 (2011–2012) ===
From Monday to Friday from 7:10 pm to 8:05 pm and the rest from 8:30 pm to 8:55 pm The columnists for season 2011–12:

- Ariane Massenet : medias
- China Moses : music
- Solweig Rediger-Lizlow : Weather
- Mouloud Achour : The daily mouloud
- Omar and Fred : Le Service après-vente des émissions
- Jean-Michel Aphatie : Politics
- Bruno Donnet : La petite semaine
- Damien Cabrespines : Le crash test and La Short List
- Ollivier Pourriol : culture and literature
- Kamel Boutayeb : Le Tour de Magie
- Kyan Khojandi : Bref (mini-series, from Monday to Thursday)
- Charlotte Le Bon and Alex Lutz : L'envers du décor (sketches, Friday) Part of 'Petit Journal’
- Vincent Glad: Campagne présidentielle 2.0 (chronique Web, depuis janvier 2012)
- Stéphane Bak, Laurent Weill and Elise Chassaing: Only present during the Film Festival)

=== Season 9 (2012–2013) ===
From Monday to Friday from 7:10 pm to 8:05 pm and the rest from 8:30 pm to 8:55 pm The columnists for season 2012–13:

- Daphné Bürki
- Jean-Michel Aphatie : politics
- Mouloud Achour : Chez Mouloud (at the start of the season, he had his own platform but appeared on Grand Journal)
- Vincent Glad : Web
- Elise Chassaing : Cinema
- Doria Tillier: Weather
- Augustin Trapenard: Literary columnist
- Chris Esquerre: Humor columnist (the results of the week)
- Sébastien Thoen: Humor columnist
- Kamel Boutayeb: Le Tour de Magie
- Stéphane Bak: Humor Columnist (when?)
- 10 minutes à perdre (to lose): La Question de la fin (Baptiste Lorber, James Darle and Grandpamini, at the start of the season), then Shitcom (Fridays, ended 2012)
- Nawell Madani : Humor columnist (when?)
- Alice Belaïdi and Clémence Faure : Sophie et Sophie
- Jérôme Niel and inviteds : Groom Service (During the Film Festival)

=== Season 10 (2013–2014) ===
From Monday to Friday from 7:10 pm to 8:25 pm The columnists of season 2013–14:

- Jean-Michel Aphatie : politics
- Doria Tillier: Weather
- Augustin Trapenard: Literary columnist
- Jeannette Bougrab
- Arié Elmaleh: humor (From August 26, 2013 till February 2014)
- Hélène Jouan
- Karim Rissouli: Political columnist: Karim a dit
- Sébastien Thoen : Humor columnist
- Valérie Amarou
- Pendant ce temps (Kevin Razy, Inna Modja, Vanessa Guide, Marc Jarousseau alias Kemar, Julien Pestel) : mini-sketches (From Monday to Thursday). The sketches landed in a small controversy due to their format's similarity to British YouTuber Thomas "Tomska" Ridgewell's "Meanwhile" webseries when it first aired; Ridgewell was eventually credited with financial compensation in later episodes. Transferred in the 'Before' in January 2014.
- Connasse (Camille Cottin) mini-sketches (Tuesday and Friday at 8:15 since January 2014). This short program passed on Before au Grand Journal in exchange for Pendant ce temps.
- Les Tutos (Jérôme Niel alias La Ferme Jérôme) : mini-sketches (Friday at 8:15
- Le Rappel Des Titres (Monsieur Poulpe and Vanessa Guide) : Fake journal (From Monday to Thursday at 8:15)
- Casting(s) (Pierre Niney): Short Program (From Monday to Friday at 8:15during Le Grand Journal De Cannes)
- Delphine Baril : humor
- Anne Nivat
- Maïtena Biraben who is the joker of Antoine de Caunes.

Other

In September 2013, the broadcast Le Before du Grand Journal by Thomas Thouroude was created; It was distributed just before Le Grand Journal at 6:05.

=== Season 11 (2014–2015) ===
From Monday to Friday from 7:05 pm to 8:20 pm The columnists of season 2014–15:

- Alison Wheeler and Monsieur Poulpe (after Raphaëlle Dupire) : weather
- Jean-Michel Aphatie : politics
- Karim Rissouli : Political columnist
- Augustin Trapenard: Literary columnist
- Natacha Polony : politics
- Mathilde Serrell : culture
- Connasse (Camille Cottin) : Short Program
- Le JT de l'invited (Monsieur Poulpe and Vanessa Guide, Alison Wheeler in replacement) : Fake journal (Monday to Thursday at:15)
- Speakerine (Jérôme Niel) : Short Program
- Carte de Presque (Alison Wheeler) : Short Program
- Nora Hamzawi : Humor columnist
- Sébastien Thoen : Public opinion Spokesperson (Humor columnist)
