= Fred Testot =

French actor and comedian (born 1977)

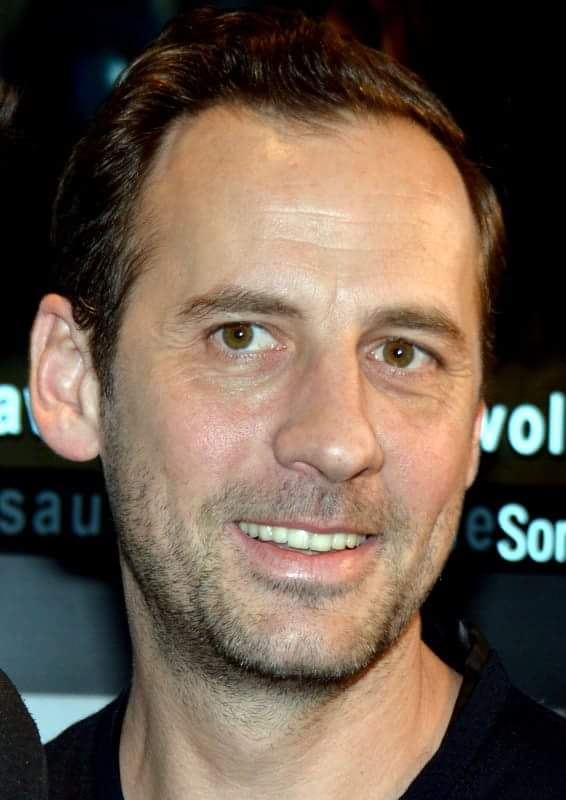
- Testot in 2015
- Born: Frédéric Giacomo Testo; 20 February 1977 (age 49); Boulogne-Billancourt, France
- Occupations: Actor, screenwriter, producer
- Years active: 1996–present
- Website: www.fredtestot.net

Frédéric Giacomo Testo (French: [fʁedeʁik dʒakɔmo tɛsto]; Italian: [ˈdʒaːkomo ˈtɛsto]; born 20 February 1977), known as Fred Testot (French: [fʁɛd tɛsto]), is a French actor, comedian and filmmaker. Since his extensive collaboration with Omar Sy on the 2000s Service après-vente des émissions series on Canal+, Testot has starred in various film, theatre and television productions. He notably held the lead role in the 2017 thriller miniseries La Mante, which aired on TF1 and later premiered on Netflix.

== Life and career ==
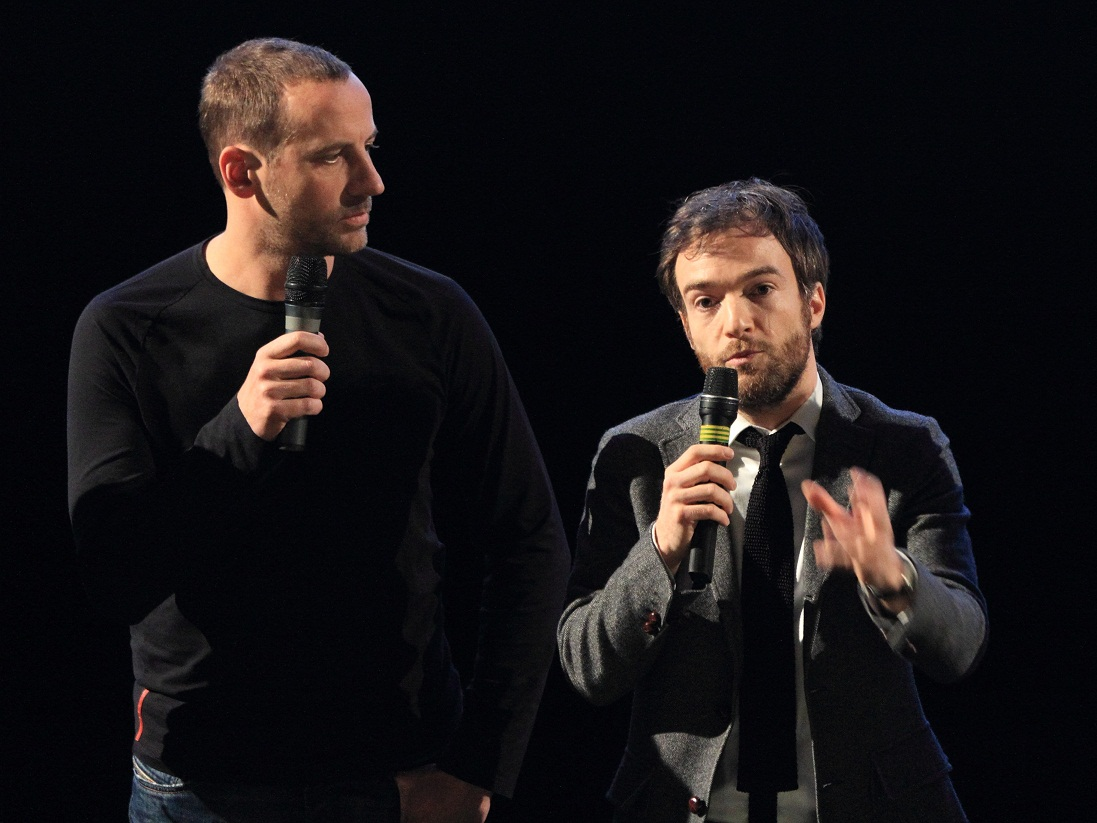
Testot with Jonathan Lambert in Paris, 2012

Born in Boulogne-Billancourt, Île-de-France and raised in Porto-Vecchio, Corsica, Testot began on Fun Radio, with Éric Judor and Ramzy Bedia (Éric et Ramzy), before appearing on Radio Nova in Jamel Debbouze's program where he met Omar Sy for the first time, in 1997.

Together, they began their television career on Canal+ on Debbouze's program, Le Cinéma de Jamel. They created Le Visiophon, d'Omar et Fred, Les sketches d'Omar et Fred and Les coming-nexts.

After a two-year hiatus, the duo returned in 2005 with a show called Service après-vente des émissions (English: "After-sales service of TV shows"). From 2006 to 2012, it became a famous daily column of Le Grand Journal, hosted by Michel Denisot.

Testot then played in several comedy movies, including Sur la piste du Marsupilami (2012), The Big Bad Wolf (2013) and Arrête ton cinéma (2016). He starred in the Netflix Original Series La Mante in 2017. In 2023, he was in the live twitch of Pertex, a French influencer.

== Filmography ==
=== Actor ===
Year	Title	Role	Director	Notes
2000	Old School	Steve	Kader Ayd	
2000	Granturismo	Voice	Denis Thybaud	Short
2001	La Tour Montparnasse Infernale	Policeman	Charles Nemes	
2001	La concierge est dans l'ascenseur		Olivier Coussemacq	Short
2001	Crimes et déguisements	Bob	Tristan Schulmann	Short
2002	Asterix & Obelix: Mission Cleopatra	Painter	Alain Chabat	
2002	Ces jours heureux	Thomas	Olivier Nakache, Eric Toledano	Short
2002	Caméra Café	Julien		TV series (1 episode)
2002	Ma Forever	Man R19	Ida Techer	Short
2004	Le Carton	David	Charles Nemes (2)	
2006	Les multiples	FJP	Julien David	TV mini-series
2006	Pigeon	Bus Driver	Benoît Gand	Short
2007	Kozak	The Cop	Olivier Fox	Short
2007	Dans leur peau		Arnaud Malherbe	Short
2007	Moot-Moot	Michel	François Reczulski	TV series
2007	Garage Babes	The Boss	Julien Pelgrand	Short
2008	Seuls Two	Xavier	Ramzy Bedia, Éric Judor	
2009	Lascars	Sammy	Emmanuel Klotz, Albert Pereira-Lazaro	
2009	Je vais te manquer	Pierrot	Amanda Sthers	
2009	La loi de Murphy	Various	Christophe Campos	
2009	Le siffleur	Xavier Mazini	Philippe Lefebvre	
2009	Arthur and the Revenge of Maltazard	Replay	Luc Besson	
2009	Logorama	Ronald McDonald, Big Boy	François Alaux, Hervé de Crécy	French version
2010	Ya basta!	Voice	Gustave Kervern, Sébastien Rost	Short
2010	Le pas Petit Poucet	Jean Doumé	Christophe Campos (2)	TV movie
2010	Gardiens de l'ordre	Simon	Nicolas Boukhrief	
2010	Allez raconte!	The host	Jean-Christophe Roger	
2010	Histoires de vies	Stef	Akhenaton, Didier D. Daarwin	TV series (1 episode)
2011	Itinéraire bis	Jean	Jean-Luc Perréard	
2011	Au bistro du coin	Manu	Charles Nemes (3)	
2011	La guerre des boutons	Father Simon	Yann Samuell	
2011	Voisin voisin	Xavier	Timothée Augendre, Geoffroy Degouy	Short
2005–2012	Service après-vente des émissions	Various		TV series
2011–2012	Fish'n Chips	Chips	Naga Christelle, Prakash Topsy	TV series (52 episodes)
2012	Sea, No Sex & Sun	Guillaume	Christophe Turpin	
2012	Bref	Party Guest on Phone	Kyan Khojandi	TV series (1 episode)
2012	Sur la piste du Marsupilami	Hermoso	Alain Chabat (2)	
2012	Dépression et des potes	Franck	Arnaud Lemort	
2013	The Big Bad Wolf	Henri Delcroix	Nicolas Charlet & Bruno Lavaine	
2013	Y'a pas d'âge	Luc	Carlo Da Fonseca Parsotam	TV series (1 episode)
2013	Platane	Fred	Denis Imbert, Éric Judor (2)	TV series (2 episodes)
2014	Get Well Soon	Captain Maxime Leroy	Jean Becker	
2015	Rose et le soldat	Jacques Meyer	Jean-Claude Barny, Jean-Claude Flamand	TV movie
2015	L'emprise	Marcello Guillemin	Claude-Michel Rome	TV movie
2016	Arrête ton cinéma	Adrien	Diane Kurys	
2016	Pattaya	The pilot	Franck Gastambide	
2016	Zootopia	Benjamin Clawhauser	Byron Howard	French dub
2017	La Mante	Damien Carrot	Alexandre Laurent	Netflix Original Series
2025	Asterix and Obelix: The Big Fight	Fastenfurius	Alain Chabat and Fabrice Joubert	Netflix Original Series
2025	Colours of Time	Félix Nadar	Cédric Klapisch	
2025	Scènes de ménages	Damien		1 special
2025	Zootopia 2	Benjamin Clawhauser	Byron Howard	French dub
2026	Flunked (TV series)	Fabien	François Uzan	

=== Shows ===
- 2006: Omar et Fred, le spectacle
