= Lauren Bastide =

French journalist, feminist, podcaster

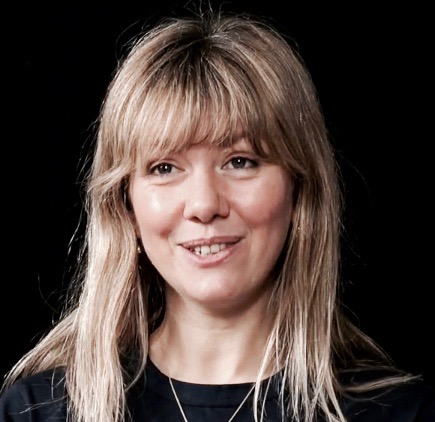
- Born: 30 October 1981 (age 44); Orléans, France
- Occupation: Journalist

Lauren Bastide (born 30 October 1981) is a French journalist, feminist, podcaster, spokesperson for the better representation of women and an activist on intersectional feminism.

== Biography ==
Bastide was born in Orléans, France on 30 October 1981. She completed her baccalaureate in 1997, before spending a year in a literary preparatory class. In 2002, she graduated with a degree in International Relations from the Institute of Political Studies in Strasbourg. Bastide later went back to college to earn a master's degree in Gender Studies from University of Paris 8 Vincennes-Saint-Denis. She spent time working in a number of positions in Reuters and Le Monde. Bastide graduated from the Training Center for Journalists (CFJ) in 2005. Her work appeared in Lurve and Antidote between 2009 and 2014. Bastide spent ten years working on the editorial staff of Elle before being made the editor-in-chief of the news pages. With Sophie Fontanel, she founded the DailyElle in April 2012. This was the online version of the magazine.

Bastide made her television debut in the show Le Grand 8 on C8 in 2012. She went on to appear in Stylia in the show À la vie, in à la mode. In September 2015, Bastide became part of the team on Le Grand Journal, hosted daily by Maïtena Biraben. After this Bastide began to work on podcasts. She founded a production studio with Julien Neuville in 2016. Her podcast was called La Poudre, where she talked to women artists, intellectuals or politicians. From July 2017, Bastide has hosted the weekly show Les Savantes on France Inter.

== Public positions ==
In 2021, she wrote on her Instagram account that she does not publicly support Mila (of the Mila affair), stating: "I do not share her world vision, which is racist and disrespectful of French (male) Muslims and (female) Muslims". She was criticized by the philosopher Marylin Maeso who accused her of lying when she describes "as a racist and disrespectful of Muslims a young homosexual who only said what she thought of beliefs that were thrown at her to dehumanize her as a lesbian."

== Publications ==
- Jeanne Damas, Lauren Bastide, À Paris, Grasset, 2017
- Lauren Bastide, Présentes, Allary Éditions, 2020
- Lauren Bastide, La Poudre - Féminismes et cinéma, Marabout, 2021
- Lauren Bastide, Sororité, adelphité, solidarité in Chloé Delaume, Sororité, Points 2021, pp. 121–132

== Bibliography ==
- In Paris, 2017, 2018
- I Am Andrea Crews, 2012
