= Pitchfork Music Festival Paris 2017 =

- Dates: 2–4 November 2017
- Locations: Grande halle de la Villette, Paris, France
- Website: pitchforkmusicfestival.fr

The Pitchfork Music Festival Paris 2017 was held from 2 to 4 November 2017 at the Grande halle de la Villette, Paris, France. It was headlined by The National, Jungle, and Run the Jewels. The National also curated the performers of the first day.

The festival was preceded by block party Avant-Garde, held in various venues around Paris on 31 October and 1 November. The After Parties were held on 2–3 November at the Le Trabendo.

== Line-ups ==
Headline performers are listed in boldface. Artists listed from latest to earliest set times.

Thursday, 2 November	Friday, 3 November	Saturday, 4 November
**The National**; Kevin Morby; Ride; Rone (Note: French singer Mina Tindle was supposed to perform at the festival but cancelled. She was replaced by Rone.); Chassol; This Is the Kit; Moses Sumney; Ethan Lipton & His Orchestra	**Jungle**; Polo & Pan (Live); Kamasi Washington; Rejjie Snow; Isaac Delusion; Andy Shauf; Sylvan Esso; Tommy Genesis; Cigarettes After Sex; HMLTD	Talaboman; The Black Madonna; Bicep (Live); The Blaze; **Run the Jewels**; Princess Nokia; BadBadNotGood; Jacques; Loyle Carner; Tom Misch (Live); Songe; Sigrid

=== Avant-Garde and After Parties line-ups ===
Artists listed from latest to earliest set times.

Mécanique Ondulatoire
Tuesday, 31 October	Wednesday, 1 November
Bryan's Magic Tears; Sorry; NOLIFE	Priests; The Pale White; Bad Nerves

Café de la Danse
Tuesday, 31 October	Wednesday, 1 November
Big Thief; (Sandy) Alex G; Isaac Gracie	Noga Erez; Nick Hakim; Rostam

Badaboum
Tuesday, 31 October	Wednesday, 1 November
Benny Mails; A2; Obongjayar; Mavi Phoenix	Hundred Waters; Jamila Woods; Oklou; Sälen

La Loge
Tuesday, 31 October	Wednesday, 1 November
Julie Byrne; Leif Vollebekk; Korey Dane	Wovoka Gentle; Angelo De Augustine; Matt Maltese

Pop Up Du Label
Tuesday, 31 October	Wednesday, 1 November
Tennyson; Lido Pimienta; K Á R Y Y N	Oko Ebombo; Pauli; Soleil Vert

Pan Piper
Tuesday, 31 October	Wednesday, 1 November
You Man; Malca; SuperParka; Ary	Ray BLK; Hare Squead; Triplego; Ama Lou

Supersonic
Tuesday, 31 October	Wednesday, 1 November
Pinegrove; Yellow Days; Puma Blue	Vagabon; Yowl; Silly Boy Blue

After Parties
Thursday, 2 November	Friday, 3 November
Ben UFO B2B Call Super; Palms Trax; Abstraxion; Sapphire Slows	Jacques Greene (Live); Actress (Live); Cologne Tape; Deena Abdelwahed; Théo Muller
