= SAV des émissions =

- Genre: Sketch comedy
- Created by: Omar Sy; Fred Testot
- Starring: Omar Sy; Fred Testot
- Country of origin: France
- Original language: French
- No. of seasons: 7
- No. of episodes: Over 5,000

Production
- Running time: 2 minutes 15

Original release
- Network: Canal+, Virgin Radio
- Release: 2005 – 2012

Service après-vente des émissions, also known as SAV des émissions, is a French short comedy television series hosted by the comic duo Omar and Fred (Omar Sy and Fred Testot) from 2005 to 2012 on Canal+. The show was a segment of Le Grand Journal, a news show then-hosted by Michel Denisot. Each episode was rebroadcast the following morning on Virgin Radio.

== The series ==
- The SAV des émissions is a receiving calling center. The basic concept is to comment on the news in a succession of short scenes. Over the years, the series also gained a number of recurring characters, interpreted by either Omar or Fred. Instead of commenting on the news, each of these usually has their own running gag and catchphrases.
- Each gag begins with Omar or Fred picking up the phone and saying "Service après-vente, bonjour !". The other plays a character calling the SAV to ask a question.
- The series often uses surreal humor, either with the costumes or the dialogue.
- At first, the SAV was a segment in 20h10 pétantes, a program hosted by Stéphane Bern from 2005 until 2006. From 2006, the SAV was included daily in Le Grand Journal of Michel Denisot except on football nights.
