= Mila affair =

French media and judicial case (2020–2021)

The Mila affair (French: Affaire Mila) is a French media and judicial case relating to freedom of speech and cyberbullying. After a Muslim man invoking Islam directed misogynistic and homophobic insults at Mila Orriols, a 16-year old juvenile lesbian French highschooler, when she rejected his inappropriate sexual advances; she responded later on social media by critiquing Islam as a hateful religion. The teenage girl then received millions of online threats of death and rape by enraged Muslim men and women, forcing her to leave school and to be placed under police protection.

== Event ==
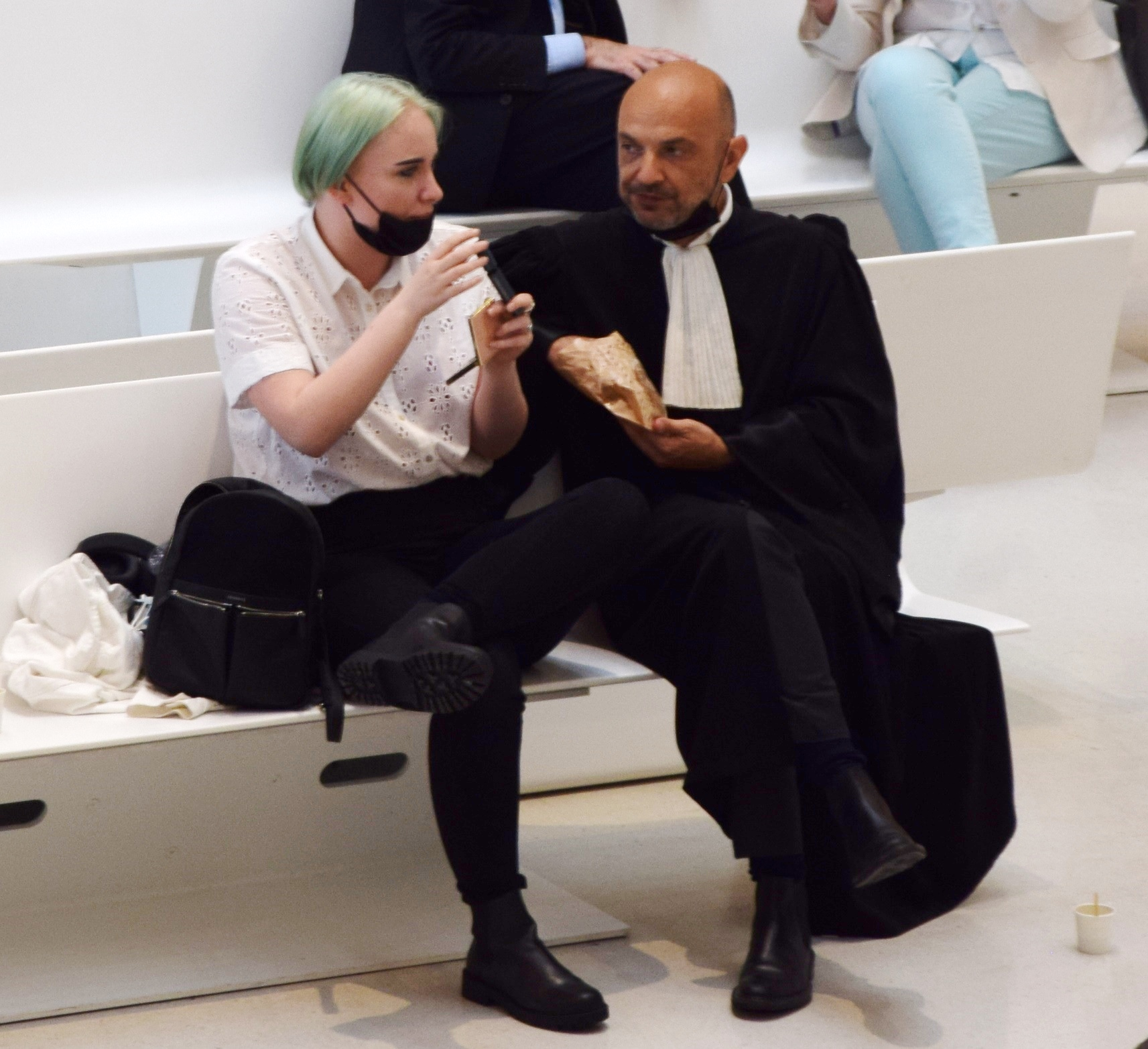
Mila and her lawyer, Richard Malka, talking during a recess at the Tribunal de Paris, on 22 June 2021.

On 18 January 2020, Mila Orriols, a 16-year-old juvenile lesbian French female high school student from Grenoble, in the Isère department of southeastern France, made a live-stream with followers and talked with them about their love life, and answered to one of them that she indeed wasn't "particularly attracted to Arab and Black women". Later on the stream, a Muslim man flirted with her inappropriately and she rejected him. The boy responded with a series of misogynistic and homophobic insults in the name of "Allah", including "dirty whore", "dirty lesbian" and "dirty racist". Mila responded by posting a video (available for 24 hours) on social media, where she criticized and made insulting remarks towards Islam and Qur'an :

I hate religion. [...] The Qur’an there is only hatred in it, Islam is shit. [...] I said what I thought, you won’t make me regret it. There are still people who will get excited, I clearly have nothing to do with it, I say what I want, what I think. Your religion, it's shit, your God, I'm putting a finger in his asshole. Thank you, goodbye

The video was copied and widely shared on social media.

After her video clip went viral, she received over ten million hate messages, mostly death and rape threats from enraged Muslim men and women online. Edited videos of her being hurt in various ways also went viral. The Muslim haters also doxxed the address of her school.

Mila later received the tile of France’s ‘teenage Rushdie’ because of parallels drawn to British-Indian novelist Salman Rushdie who had fallen into controversy with angry Muslim extremists in the late 1980s for voicing his opinion.

She and her family were consequently forced to live under 24-hour police protection per decision of the interior minister Christophe Castaner, and she has not been able to attend school since then.

On 3 February, she appeared in a TV interview where she stated "I am not a racist, not at all. You can’t be racist about a religion. I said what I thought, I am completely in my rights. I don’t regret it at all." She also announced that she would be filing a lawsuit against some of the people who harassed her with death threats, being represented by Richard Malka, who had previously represented Charlie Hebdo in the Jyllands-Posten Muhammad cartoons controversy.

On 14 November 2020, she made another livestream criticising Islam, declaring that her detractors should "keep an eye on your buddy Allah because my fingers are still up his asshole and I'm not taking them out." The video led to another wave of harassment and threats.

In March 2021, her Twitter account was briefly suspended after a mass reporting campaign by the people harassing her.

== Public reactions ==
This sparked a nationwide debate on the freedom of expression, Muslims, and the right to blaspheme. Blasphemy is not criminalized in France, and the initial police investigation against the girl's online comments was found to be without merit.

The hashtag #JenesuispasMila ("I am not Mila") was widely used, along with the #JesuisMila ("I am Mila") one. According to a February 2020 poll, 53% of people in France support Mila and half of them are in favor of a right of blasphemy (half being against), which was seen as surprisingly low.

=== Politicians ===
The Minister of Justice, Nicole Belloubet, said that "insulting religion is serious" and is "obviously a breach of freedom of thoughts", but later said that she regretted her "clumsy" words. Ségolène Royal, argued that the case shouldn't be presented as a martyr in the debate about secularism in France and that "the right to criticise a religion doesn't mean you should do it without respect."

On 12 February 2020, Emmanuel Macron defended the girl's right of freedom of speech, stating that we forget here that we are talking about a 16-year-old girl. La France Insoumise leader Jean-Luc Mélenchon stated that "in this country, we don't threaten to kill people because they have an opinion we don't like."

=== Activists and public figures ===
Several associations, such as the Representative Council of France's Black Associations, Collectif NousToutes, Femen, Osez le féminisme !, and SOS Homophobie, issued statements denouncing the harassment. Mila criticized feminists and LGBT associations for not supporting her in their majority.

Both left- and right-wing commentators, such as Eugénie Bastié and Amar Bellal, have criticized the silence of French feminists and left-wing activists on the affair. Annie Sugier, former president of the Ligue du droit international des femmes, argued that the French press had failed to cover the statements released by feminist organizations supporting Mila. Alice Coffin argued that the perception of feminist lack of support for Mila was being weaponized to attack feminist activists in France.

Feminist journalist Lauren Bastide said that she does not publicly support Mila, stating "I do not share her world vision, which is racist and disrespectful of French Muslims". The philosopher Marylin Maeso said that Bastide lied by writing that Mila is a racist and described Mila as "a young homosexual who only said what she thought of beliefs that were thrown at her to dehumanize her as a lesbian and criticized Lauren Bastide as not a real feminist.".

=== Muslim response ===
In January 2020, Abdallah Zekri, an executive officer of the French Council of the Muslim Faith (CFCM), on Sud Radio, justified the violent rape and death threats that Mila had received from Muslim men and women, by saying "you reap what you sow" and that she [Mila] had to "bear the consequences of what she said". The president of the CFCM, Mohammed Moussaoui, speaking in the name of the CFCM in an official statement, said that the organisation denounced any form of threat and said that the words "she asked for it" by Zekri were "inappropriate".

On 8 July 2021, Mila made a 2-hour private tour of the Grand Mosque of Paris at the invitation of its dean, Chems-Eddine Hafiz, who is a friend and colleague of her lawyer, Malka. The tour included prayer rooms normally forbidden to visitors. Hafiz offered her a rose colored copy of the Quran. Mila said it was a "friendly visit" and a "very important token of peace".

== Criminal trials ==
In October 2020, a 23-year-old person was sentenced to three years in prison for sending death threats online.

In July 2021, eleven out of thirteen accused were found guilty of online harassment in a trial in Paris. They received suspended prison sentences between four and six months plus each paying 1500 euros in damages to the victim along with each paying 1000 euros towards her legal fees. Mila thanked her parents, her lawyer, the police who protected her and the few feminists and antiracist NGOs who supported her. Two of the defendants made an appeal, and received more severe sentences. The first one, who threatened her to "do her a Samuel Paty" if she tells him where she lives, received a suspended prison sentence of two years. The second one received a suspended sentence of one year. Her lawyer, Malka, stated: "What I felt at the hearing was that these two defendants had not understood the seriousness of what they were accused of and had no regrets. Obviously, the court felt the same way, since it quadrupled and tripled their sentences".

== Book ==
In June 2021, Mila published a book about the affair entitled Je suis le prix de votre liberté (I am the price of your liberty); the book was published by Grasset. In the book, Mila also indicates that she has already suffered many derogatory words and physical assault on the outskirts of her high school in previous years, especially from young Muslims, because of her way of dressing or her homosexuality.
