= Represent (TV series) =

- Genre: Comedy
- Created by: Jean-Pascal Zadi; François Uzan
- Starring: Jean-Pascal Zadi; Éric Judor; Benoît Poelvoorde; Fadily Camara; Panayotis Pascot; Marina Foïs
- Composer: Chassol
- Country of origin: France
- Original language: French
- No. of seasons: 2
- No. of episodes: 12

Production
- Running time: 26–34 min.
- Production companies: Netflix; Studio 14; Twelve Fingers Productions

Original release
- Network: Netflix
- Release: 20 January 2023 – present

Represent (in French: En place) is a 2023 French comedy television series created by Jean-Pascal Zadi and François Uzan and directed by Zadi, and starring Zadi, Éric Judor, and Benoît Poelvoorde. It premiered on 20 January 2023.

== Cast and characters ==
- Jean-Pascal Zadi – Stéphane Blé
- Éric Judor – William Crozon
- Benoît Poelvoorde – Éric Andréi
- Fadily Camara – Marion Blé
- Panayotis Pascot – Jérôme
- Marina Foïs – Corinne Douanier
- Fary – Désiré
- Souad Arsane – Yasmine
- Jean-Claude Muaka – Mo
- Saabo Balde – Lamine
- Pasquale d'Inca – Didier
- Salimata Kamate – Simone
- Sylvestre Amoussou – Claude
- Pierre-Emmanuel Barré – Fred Cognard
- Emmanuel Dehaene – Étienne Durandeau
- Sean Guégan – Nathan Fronck
- Patrick Puydebat – Cop
- Olivier Truchot – Himself
- Alain Marshall – Himself
- Anne-Sophie Lapix – Himself
- Virginie Guilhaume – Himself
- Sébastien Thoen – Himself
- Antonia de Rendering – Gynecologist

== Episodes ==
Series	Episodes	Originally released
1	6	20 January 2023
2	6	29 August 2024

=== Season 1 (2023) ===
No. overall	No. in season	Title	Directed by	Written by	Original release date
1	1	"Under Way"	Jean-Pascal Zadi	François Uzan, Jean Pascal Zadi	20 January 2023
2	2	"Under Construction"	Jean-Pascal Zadi	François Uzan, Jean Pascal Zadi	20 January 2023
3	3	"Uncharted Territory"	Jean-Pascal Zadi	François Uzan, Jean Pascal Zadi	20 January 2023
4	4	"Under Threat"	Jean-Pascal Zadi	François Uzan, Jean Pascal Zadi	20 January 2023
5	5	"Live on Air"	Jean-Pascal Zadi	François Uzan, Jean Pascal Zadi	20 January 2023
6	6	"The Final Hurdle"	Jean-Pascal Zadi	François Uzan, Jean Pascal Zadi	20 January 2023

=== Season 2 (2024) ===
No. overall	No. in season	Title	Directed by	Written by	Original release date
7	1	"In the Palace"	Jean-Pascal Zadi	François Uzan, Jean Pascal Zadi	29 August 2024
8	2	"In Sync"	Jean-Pascal Zadi	François Uzan, Jean Pascal Zadi	29 August 2024
9	3	"On the Throne"	Jean-Pascal Zadi	François Uzan, Jean Pascal Zadi	29 August 2024
10	4	"On a Mission"	Jean-Pascal Zadi	François Uzan, Jean Pascal Zadi	29 August 2024
11	5	"In Truth"	Jean-Pascal Zadi	François Uzan, Jean Pascal Zadi	29 August 2024
12	6	"On the Run"	Jean-Pascal Zadi	François Uzan, Jean Pascal Zadi	29 August 2024

== Reception ==
In a review in The New Yorker, Richard Brody claimed that "Represent draws its over-all force from a surprising and audacious idea: an attempt to define, and to redefine, France's political left".

The newspaper Le Monde had a favorable review, with some reservations: "After three furiously funny episodes (...), the series weakens to make way for less political digressions".
