= Omar Sy =

French actor (born 1978)

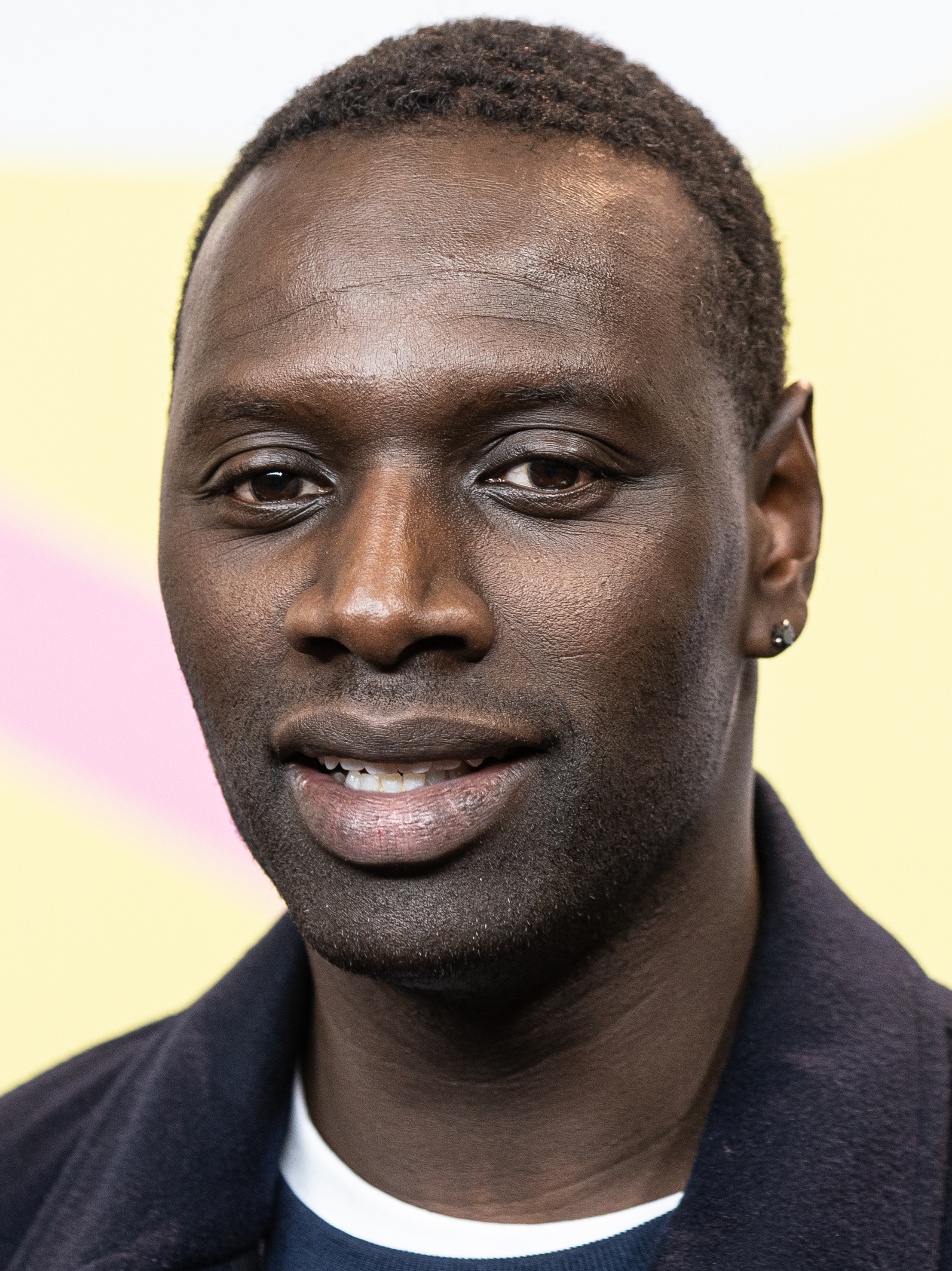
- Sy at the 2020 Berlinale
- Born: 20 January 1978 (age 48); Trappes, France
- Occupation: Actor
- Years active: 2000–present
- Spouse: Hélène Sy (m. 2007)
- Children: 5

Omar Sy (French pronunciation: [ɔmaʁ si]; Fula: 𞤌𞤥𞤢𞤪 𞤅𞤭, romanized: Omar Si; born 20 January 1978) is a French actor. Sy was initially best known in France for his comedy sketches with Fred Testot on the Service après-vente des émissions television show on Canal+ (2005–2012). He gained wider international recognition for his role in the 2011 comedy-drama film The Intouchables, which earned him the César Award for Best Actor, making him the first black recipient.

He later appeared in larger productions such as X-Men: Days of Future Past (2014), Jurassic World (2015), Two Is a Family (2016), Chocolat (2016), Inferno (2016), Transformers: The Last Knight (2017), Arctic Dogs (2019), the Netflix-produced series Lupin (2021–present), Jurassic World Dominion, and The Takedown (2022).

== Early life and family ==
The fourth of eight children, Omar Sy was born on 20 January 1978 in Trappes in the Yvelines department of the Île-de-France region. Both his parents are immigrants from West Africa. His Mauritanian mother, Diaratou, worked as a house cleaner, and his Senegalese father, Demba, worked in an auto parts factory after moving from Bakel to France in 1962. Sy is of Fulani origin. He was raised in a habitation à loyer modéré in Trappes. The family visited Senegal every other summer and spoke Pulaar at home. Sy is the uncle of actor Alassane Diong.

== Career ==
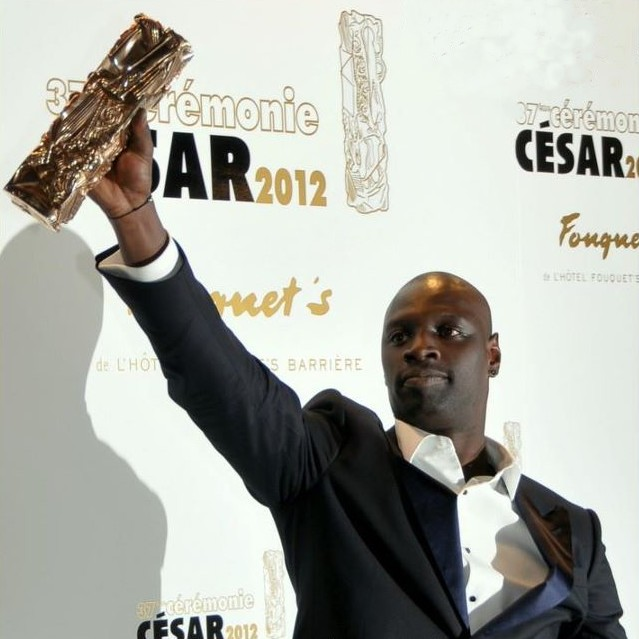
Omar Sy winning the César Award for Best Actor in 2012 at the 37th César Awards for The Intouchables

Sy began his career after high school in 1996, working at Radio Nova, where he met his comedy partner Fred Testot. Afterwards, he appeared in the TV show Le Cinéma de Jamel on Canal+ with Jamel Debbouze. He then created a TV show called Le Visiophon. Following these roles, he appeared in various TV and stage shows such as Je ne fais pas mon âge and Omar et Fred: le spectacle. Most notably, Sy co-hosted Service après-vente des émissions, a French short comedy television series, with Testot from 2005 to 2012 on Canal+ until it was cancelled.

He appeared in the television game show Fort Boyard in 2006.

Sy then went to Los Angeles, where he lent his voice to Zip in the French version of the Tomb Raider Legend video game. He previously had also voiced a sheep in Disney's Brother Bear.

In 2008, he appeared in "Bienvenue chez les Bylkas," a video clip by Sinik. In 2009, he voiced some of the characters of Logorama with his partner Fred Testot.

In 2011, Sy starred in The Intouchables, playing a streetwise young man who becomes the personal care assistant to a wealthy quadriplegic (played by François Cluzet). The film enjoyed tremendous success, topping the French box office in 2011 and becoming the bestselling French film of all time in its native country, with more than 19 million tickets sold. As a result, Sy was voted third favourite French personality behind Yannick Noah and Zinedine Zidane. The role earned him the 2012 Globe de Cristal for Best Actor. He also received a nomination for a Satellite Award for Best Actor. He and co-star François Cluzet were jointly bestowed the Best Actor Award at the Tokyo International Film Festival. Additionally, he won the César Award for Best Actor in 2012 for the same film.

On 30 December 2012, Sy was voted the favourite personality in France, based on a poll by Le Journal du Dimanche, ahead of fellow actor Gad Elmaleh.

In 2014, Sy appeared in X-Men: Days of Future Past, playing the character Bishop. He also starred in Samba, directed by Éric Toledano and Olivier Nakache. He co-starred in the fourth installment of the Jurassic Park franchise, Jurassic World, released in June 2015. In 2015, alongside Bradley Cooper, he played a compromised chef in Burnt. In 2017, he voiced the character Hot Rod in the film Transformers: The Last Knight, the fifth installment in the Transformers series. In 2021, he starred in Netflix's hit series Lupin, a modern day retelling of Arsène Lupin novels. Lupin has become one of the most-watched non-English series on Netflix. More recently, Sy has signed a multi-year feature film deal with Netflix. In 2021, he was included on the Time 100, Time's annual list of the most influential people in the world. Most recently, Sy signed a first-look deal with HBO Max to develop a series for multiple markets, especially French-speaking ones.

== Personal life ==
Growing up in Trappes, Sy became friends with fellow actor Jamel Debbouze and professional footballer Nicolas Anelka.

On 5 July 2007, Sy married Hélène, the mother of his five children, in Tremblay-sur-Mauldre. They had been together for ten years before they got married. Hélène runs CéKeDuBonheur, a nonprofit supporting children’s wards at French hospitals, and Siyah Organics, a Sénégalo-American organic-food-supplements company. The family resided in Montfort-l'Amaury, a commune of Île-de-France, before moving to Los Angeles in 2012. After moving to Los Angeles, Sy met with a language tutor daily and watched Keeping Up with the Kardashians to improve his English.

Sy is a Muslim.

Sy is a supporter of Olympique de Marseille.

He signed an October 2023 open letter of Artists4Ceasefire during the Israeli bombardment of Gaza.

He is an ambassador for the 2026 Summer Youth Olympics in Dakar, Senegal.

== Business ventures ==
In June 2025, Sy became a co-owner of French basketball club Paris Basketball of LNB Élite, alongside David Kahn.

== Filmography ==
=== Film ===
| Year | Title | Role | Director | Notes |
|---|---|---|---|---|
| 2000 | Granturismo | Voice | Denis Thybaud | Short |
| 2001 | La Tour Montparnasse Infernale | Taxi | Charles Nemes | |
| 2001 | La concierge est dans l'ascenseur | Omar | Olivier Coussemacq | Short |
| 2002 | Le Boulet | Malian No. 3 | Alain Berberian & Frédéric Forestier | |
| 2002 | Asterix & Obelix: Mission Cleopatra | Painter | Alain Chabat | Deleted scene |
| 2002 | Samourais | Tyson | Giordano Gederlini | |
| 2002 | The Race | UN Sergeant | Djamel Bensalah | |
| 2002 | Ces jours heureux | Brice | Éric Toledano and Olivier Nakache | Short |
| 2003 | La Beuze | Michel Dembélé | François Desagnat & Thomas Sorriaux | |
| 2004 | Le Carton | Lorenzo | Charles Nemes | |
| 2004 | Coming-out | Max | Olivier Ayache-Vidal | Short |
| 2006 | Nos jours heureux | Joseph | Éric Toledano and Olivier Nakache | |
| 2007 | Garage Babes | Hamidou | Julien Pelgrand | Video |
| 2008 | 2 Alone in Paris | Sammy Bouglioni | Éric Judor & Ramzy Bedia | |
| 2009 | Micmacs | Remington | Jean-Pierre Jeunet | |
| 2009 | Arthur and the Revenge of Maltazard | Snow (voice) | Luc Besson | French dub |
| 2009 | Lascars | Narbé (voice) | Emmanuel Klotz & Albert Pereira-Lazaro | |
| 2009 | Tellement proches | Bruno | Éric Toledano and Olivier Nakache | |
| 2009 | King Guillaume | Jean-Peter | Pierre-François Martin-Laval | |
| 2009 | Safari | Youssouf Hammal | Olivier Baroux | |
| 2009 | Envoyés très spéciaux | Jimmy | Frédéric Auburtin | |
| 2009 | La Loi de Murphy | Father Joachim Ortega | Christophe Campos | |
| 2009 | Logorama | Michelin Man, Yellow M&Ms, Mr. Clean (voice) | François Alaux | French version |
| 2010 | Allez raconte! | Momo (voice) | Jean-Christophe Roger | |
| 2010 | Florence Foresti: Mother Fucker | Taxi Driver | Nicolas Benamou | Video |
| 2011 | Les Tuche | Bouzolles Vicar | Olivier Baroux | |
| 2011 | The Intouchables | Bakary "Driss" Bassari | Éric Toledano and Olivier Nakache | |
| 2012 | De l'autre côté du périph | Ousmane Diakhaté | David Charhon | |
| 2012 | Les seigneurs | Wéké N'Dogo | Olivier Dahan | |
| 2012 | Mais qui a re-tué Pamela Rose? | Mosby | Olivier Baroux & Kad Merad | |
| 2012 | Crazy Pink Limo | The Philosopher | Joséphine de Meaux | Short |
| 2013 | Mood Indigo | Nicolas | Michel Gondry | |
| 2013 | Aux Armes: AIDES | Narrator (voice) | Camille Delamarre | Short |
| 2014 | Good People | Khan | Henrik Ruben Genz | |
| 2014 | X-Men: Days of Future Past | Bishop | Bryan Singer | |
| 2014 | Samba | Samba Cissé | Éric Toledano and Olivier Nakache | |
| 2014 | Mune: Guardian of the Moon | Sohone (voice) | Benoît Philippon & Alexandre Heboyan | |
| 2015 | Jurassic World | Barry | Colin Trevorrow | |
| 2015 | Burnt | Michel | John Wells | |
| 2016 | Chocolat | Clown Chocolat | Roschdy Zem | |
| 2016 | The Angry Birds Movie | Red (voice) | Fergal Reilly & Clay Kaytis | French dub |
| 2016 | Norm of the North | Norm (voice) | Trevor Wall | French dub |
| 2016 | Inferno | Christoph Bouchard | Ron Howard | |
| 2016 | Demain tout commence | Samuel | Hugo Gélin | |
| 2017 | Sahara | Ajar (voice) | Pierre Coré | French dub |
| 2017 | Knock | Knock | Lorraine Lévy | |
| 2017 | Transformers: The Last Knight | Hot Rod (voice) | Michael Bay | |
| 2018 | Le flic de Belleville | Sebastian Bouchard | Rachid Bouchareb | |
| 2018 | Yao | Seydou Tall | Philippe Godeau | |
| 2019 | Le Chant du loup | D'Orsi | Antonin Baudry | |
| 2019 | Arctic Dogs | Leopold (voice) | Aaron Woodley | |
| 2020 | The Call of the Wild | Perrault | Chris Sanders | |
| 2020 | Le prince oublié | The Dad/The Prince | Michel Hazanavicius | |
| 2020 | Night Shift | Aristide | Anne Fontaine | |
| 2020 | Refugee | Marwan | Brandt Andersen | Short |
| 2020 | Tout simplement noir | Omarius | John Wax & Jean-Pascal Zadi | |
| 2020 | Soul | Joe Gardner | Pete Docter and Kemp Powers | French dub |
| 2022 | The Takedown | Ousmane Diakhité | Louis Leterrier | |
| 2022 | Father & Soldier | Bakary Diallo | Mathieu Vadepied | |
| 2022 | Jurassic World Dominion | Barry | Colin Trevorrow | |
| 2023 | The Book of Clarence | Barabbas | Jeymes Samuel | |
| 2024 | The Killer | Sey | John Woo | |
| 2025 | Shadow Force | Isaac | Joe Carnahan | |
| 2025 | French Lover | Abel Camara | Lisa Nina-Rives | |
| 2027 | Untitled Ocean's Eleven prequel | | Bradley Cooper | Filming |
| 2027 | Dumas: Black Devil | | Ladj Ly | |

=== Television ===
| Year | Title | Role | Notes |
|---|---|---|---|
| 2000 | La cape et l'épée | Minstrel | TV series (1 episode) |
| 2000 | Omarius et Fred | Various Characters | TV series |
| 2002 | Si j'étais lui | Gabriel | TV movie |
| 2003 | 7 jours au Groland | Samba Bongo | TV series (1 episode) |
| 2003-2008 | Les Guignols de l'Info | Additional voices | |
| 2006 | Les multiples | Jimmy (voice) | TV series |
| 2007 | Moot-Moot | Isidore, Various Characters (voice) | TV series |
| 2010 | Le pas Petit Poucet | Big Thumbling | TV movie |
| 2010 | Histoires de vies | Mo | TV series (1 episode) |
| 2010–2012 | SAV des émissions | Various | TV series (4 episodes) |
| 2011 | Fish'n Chips | Fish (voice) | TV series (52 episodes) |
| 2012 | Bref | Party Guest on Phone | TV series (1 episode) |
| 2012 | Zak | Himself | TV series |
| 2019 | ForesTiVi | | TV series short (1 episode) |
| 2021–present | Lupin | Assane Diop | Netflix series |

=== Video games ===
| Year | Title | Role | Notes |
|---|---|---|---|
| 2022 | Jurassic World Evolution 2 | Barry | |

== Awards and nominations ==
| Year | Award | Category | Work | Result | Ref |
|---|---|---|---|---|---|
| 2006 | Raimu de la Comédie | Actor in a Supporting Role | Nos jours heureux | Nominated | |
| 2007 | NRJ Ciné Awards | Best Young Talent in a Debut Film | Nos jours heureux | Won | |
| 2011 | Tokyo International Film Festival | Best Actor (shared with François Cluzet) | Intouchables | Won | |
| 2012 | Lumière Awards | Best Actor | Intouchables | Won | |
| 2012 | Globe de Cristal Awards | Best Actor | Intouchables | Won | |
| 2012 | César Awards | Best Actor | Intouchables | Won | |
| 2012 | Étoiles d'Or | Best Male Newcomer | Intouchables | Won | |
| 2012 | Prix Patrick Dewaere | —N/a | —N/a | Nominated | |
| 2012 | European Film Awards | Best Actor | Intouchables | Nominated | |
| 2012 | Satellite Awards | Best Actor in a Motion Picture | Intouchables | Nominated | |
| 2013 | Santa Barbara International Film Festival | Virtuoso Award | Intouchables | Won | |
| 2013 | Black Reel Awards | Best Actor | Intouchables | Nominated | |
| 2013 | Black Reel Awards | Best Breakthrough Performance | Intouchables | Nominated | |
| 2017 | Lumière Awards | Best Actor | Chocolat | Nominated | |
| 2017 | Globe de Cristal Awards | Best Actor | Chocolat | Won | |
| 2017 | César Awards | Best Actor | Chocolat | Nominated | |
| 2021 | TCA Awards | Individual Achievement in Drama | Lupin | Nominated | |
| 2021 | Montreal International Black Film Festival | Career Achievement Award | —N/a | Won | |
| 2021 | Gotham Awards | Outstanding Performance in a New Series | Lupin | Nominated | |
| 2021 | Rose d'Or | Performance of the Year | Lupin | Won | |
| 2022 | Satellite Awards | Best Actor in a Drama / Genre Series | Lupin | Won | |
| 2022 | Golden Globe Awards | Best Actor – Television Series Drama | Lupin | Nominated | |
