= Alison Wheeler (comedian) =

French comedian and actress (born 1986)

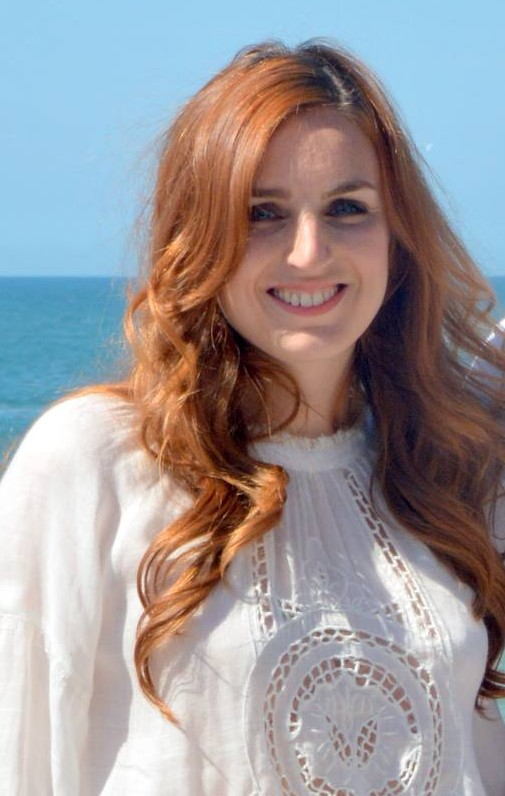
- Wheeler in 2017 at the Cabourg Film Festival
- Born: 22 July 1986 (age 39); Enghien-les-Bains, Val-d'Oise, Île-de-France, France
- Occupations: Humorist; actress

Alison Wheeler (born 22 July 1986) is a French comedian and actress.

Wheeler initially earned recognition as a member of the French cooperative Studio Bagel, a website that was later acquired by the television channel Canal+. She has an established cinematic career and is known for creating and performing musical parodies on France Inter. She currently works as a weekly humorist for the French Talk show “Quotidien”, on the private television channel TMC.

== Biography ==
=== Biography and early television ===
Of French-Irish origin, Alison Wheeler was born on 22 July 1986, in Enghien-les-Bains in Val-d'Oise to Ruth Algar a former Irish track athlete from Co. Westmeath. Her mother left Ireland at the age of 23 to work as an au-pair in France. After graduating with a Baccalauréat diploma in humanities at Notre-Dame-de-Bury High School, (Margency), she took comedy classes at Cours Florent and Studio Pygmalion. She also studied at the university Paris-Sorbonne IV.

After having participated in several television series and co-hosted the show Kawai on Filles TV alongside Louise Bourgoin, Wheeler won a role in the Saphia Azzeddine's adaption of Azzeddizine's novel Mon père est femme de ménage. Her performance as the big sister who dreams of becoming a musical star earned her a nomination for the 2012 Césars as "most promising actress". She continued on to earn a small role in the biopic My Way, by Florent Emilio Siri, also released in 2012.

During the same year, Wheeler established her internet presence: first on the site MadmoiZelle.com and later through the internet cooperative Studio Bagel, which she joined in season 2, and which provided her with a wider audience. When Studio Bagel was acquired by the television channel Canal+, Wheeler became one of television's most prominent faces. She took part in the show Le Dézapping du Before, broadcast during le Before du Grand Journal, on the programme Carte de Presque and occasionally on the Grand Journal's JT de l'invité on Canal+. However, Wheeler's most recognizable work began on 9 September 2014, as a presenter for the Grand Journal weather on Canal + with Monsieur Poulpe. She left Le Grand Journal in spring of 2015 to focus on cinema.

=== Transition to cinema and musical parodies ===
After a few small roles in popular comedies - Fonzy, by Isabelle Doval and À toute épreuve by Antoine Blossier - Wheeler acted in the dramedy Memories, by Jean-Paul Rouve, released in 2014.

However, Wheeler's new focus on cinema did not signal a total depart from news media, and in October 2015 she founded the column (Journal intime fictif) in the Antoine de Caunes's weekly show L'émission d'Antoine, broadcast on Canal+. On 23 May 2016, she launched her first video on her YouTube channel, "La chanteuse de salle de bain". The next fall Wheeler joined the Nagui show La Bande originale on France Inter as a comedic commentator, with her column La Drôle d'humeur d'Alison Wheeler, where she is recognized for her imitations and musical parodies. This garnered her a widespread audience and landed her further cinematic roles, first for the Patrick Mille comedy Going to Brazil, and then as Déborah François's co-star in the romantic comedy Loue-moi !, directed by Coline Assous and Virginie Schwartz. Both films received poor public reception and were deemed flops in 2017, despite significant media coverage for the first.

The same year, the actress won the role Mademoiselle Jeanne in Gaston Lagaffe, an adaptation of the eponymous comic strip by Pierre-François Martin-Laval.

In 2019 she published a book, Ma vie est mieux que la vôtre (Harper Collins).

== Filmography ==
=== Web videos ===
- 2012: La Nuit où by MadmoiZelle.com
- 2013: Batterie faible by Studio Bagel
- 2014: Les Techniques de drague by Norman
- 2014: Tutos épilation by Canal+
- 2014: Le Sexe Fort by Studio Bagel
- 2014: Le Gang des Clowns by Studio Bagel
- 2014: Entrée plat dessert by Studio Bagel
- 2014: Le Dernier Verre by Studio Bagel
- 2014: Bagel Phone #1 by Studio Bagel
- 2014: Carte de presque by Studio Bagel
- 2014: Friend zone by Studio Bagel
- 2014: Le Bagel à Los Angeles by Studio Bagel
- 2014: Foutre le camp by Studio Bagel
- 2014: Déjà vu by Studio Bagel
- 2014: Les Réunions by Cyprien
- 2014: Le Premier Rencard by Norman
- 2015: Cranium by CyprienGaming
- 2016: Hypersatisfaction by Studio Bagel
- 2016: Ou alors by Studio Bagel
- 2016: Rocking chair by Studio Bagel
- 2016: L'Invention des animaux by Cyprien
- 2016: La Chanteuse de la salle de bain
- 2016: Clash d'astéroïde by Théodore Bonnet (Studio Bagel)
- 2017: Le Meilleur Jeu en voiture 4 by McFly and Carlito

=== Audio fiction ===
- 2017: L'Épopée temporelle: Aliénor

=== Television ===
- 2013: Clem (season 3, episodes 2 and 3): Laura
- 2015: Objectivement (Arte): la lampe

=== Cinema ===
- 2011: Mon père est femme de ménage by Saphia Azzeddine : Alexandra
- 2012: My Way by Florent Emilio Siri : Sylvie Mathurin
- 2013: Fonzy by Isabelle Doval : Alix
- 2013: Amour extrême by Jérémie Petrus (Short) : Lucie
- 2014: Les Trois Frères, le retour by Didier Bourdon & Bernard Campan : a guest
- 2014: À toute épreuve by Antoine Blossier : Britney
- 2014: Petit lait by François Choquet (Short) : Charlotte
- 2015: Le Talent de mes amis by Alex Lutz : Amazing Star Jury
- 2016: La Cartouche by Théodore Bonnet (Short) : Tiphaine
- 2016: Kung Fu Panda 3 by Jennifer Yuh Nelson : Mei Mei (french voice)
- 2017: Going to Brazil by Patrick Mille : Agathe
- 2017: Loue-moi ! by Coline Assous & Virginie Schwartz : Bertille
- 2018: Gaston Lagaffe by Pierre-François Martin-Laval : Mademoiselle Jeanne
- 2019: Forte by Katia Lewkowicz
- 2019: Anna by Luc Besson : Dorothée
- 2021: Stuck Together by Dany Boon : Agathe

== Awards and nominations ==
Ceremony	Year	Named work	Award	Result
César Award	2012	Mon père est femme de ménage	Most Promising Actress	Pre-selected
Web Comedy Awards	2014	Alison Wheeler	Best Female Artist	Won

== See also ==
- Le Grand Journal (Canal+)
- Maxime Musqua
- Jérôme Niel
