= The Takedown =

- Poster
- French: Loin du périph
- Directed by: Louis Leterrier
- Written by: Stéphane Kazandjian
- Produced by: Eric Altmayer; Nicolas Altmayer
- Starring: Omar Sy; Laurent Lafitte; Izïa Higelin
- Cinematography: Thomas Hardmeier
- Edited by: Vincent Tabaillon
- Music by: Guillaume Roussel
- Production company: Mandarin et Compagnie
- Distributed by: Netflix
- Release date: 6 May 2022
- Running time: 119 minutes
- Country: France
- Language: French

The Takedown (French: Loin du périph) is a 2022 French action comedy film directed by Louis Leterrier and written by Stéphane Kazandjian. It is a sequel to the 2012 film On the Other Side of the Tracks, and stars Omar Sy and Laurent Lafitte (reprising their roles from the earlier film), with Izïa Higelin. The film was released on 6 May 2022 on Netflix.

== Cast ==
- Omar Sy as Ousmane Diakite
- Laurent Lafitte as François Monge
- Izïa Higelin as Alice Gauthier
- Dimitri Storoge as Brunner

== Production ==
In March 2021, it was announced that Louis Leterrier would direct a French comedy-action film for Netflix.

Principal photography began on 15 March 2021 in Paris and the Rhône-Alpes region in France.

== Release ==
The film was released by Netflix on 6 May 2022. The movie became the 7th most watched non-English language movie of all time with 78.63 million hours watched in the first 28 days of release.
