= Maïtena Biraben =

French television presenter

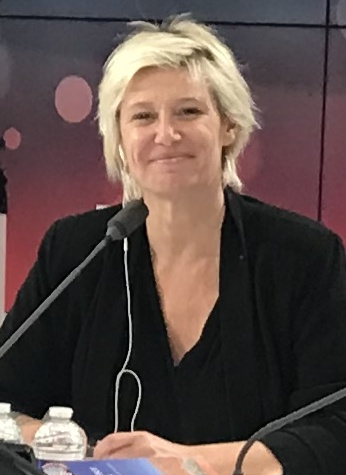
- Born: 2 July 1967 (age 59); Saint-Denis, Seine-Saint-Denis, France
- Occupation: Television presenter
- Years active: 1989–present
- Notable credit: Le Grand Journal
- Television: M6 (1997); France 2 (1999–2001); France 5 (2001–04); Canal+ (2004–16)

Maïtena Biraben (born 2 July 1967) is a French-Swiss television presenter and producer. She has notably presented on France 5 the program Les Maternelles and on Canal+ La Matinale and Le Supplément. From September 2015 to June 2016, she presented on the same channel Le Grand Journal, succeeding Antoine de Caunes.

== Early life and education ==
Maïtena Biraben was born in Saint-Denis in the department of Seine-Saint-Denis. Her father worked in photogravure and is of Basque origin. Her mother was an advertiser, before becoming an executive secretary. She moved with her family to the department of Landes and attended a boarding school run by religious sisters.

After her high school final exam, she returned to Paris to study history at the Pantheon-Sorbonne University.

== Career ==
During the 1990s, Biraben presented several programs on Télévision Suisse Romande, in addition to being an artistic producer. Despite great popularity in Switzerland, she left the channel and moved to Paris.

In 1997, Biraben joined M6 to present a program broadcast during primetime titled Télé Casting, which was not very successful. The same year, she quickly switched to France 2 where she presented Vue sur la mer and Emmenez-moi between 1998 and 2000, and a movie review segment on Télématin between 1999 and 2001.

In 2001, Biraben joined La Cinquième (which has since become France 5) and presented the program Les Maternelles between 2001 and 2004. The program obtained the 7 d'Or for best educational program. She also presented in 2003 on the same channel the program Psychologies : un moment pour soi.

In 2004, Biraben joined Canal+, where she presented Nous ne sommes pas des anges from 2004 to 2006 and Les Nouveaux Explorateurs from 2007 to 2008. From September 2008 to June 2012, she presented La Matinale and from September 2012, she presented Le Supplément every Saturday and Sunday until June 2015.

In February 2013, Biraben replaced Cyril Hanouna as host of Touche pas à mon poste on D8, the latter presenting Nouvelle Star. During the summer of 2013, Biraben became a presenter for the News Show. She was one of the favourites on Canal+ to replace Michel Denisot as presenter of Le Grand Journal for the 2013-14 season, a position which was finally awarded to Antoine de Caunes. However, she presented a few programs as a substitute. She finally succeeded him in September 2015 as presenter of Le Grand Journal. But the season was tough, with low audience figures and some controversy due to some comments she made.

In June 2016, Biraben left Canal+.

== Personal life ==
Biraben has been married three times. She lives with her partner and her two sons (born in 1996 and 2006) in a suburb of Paris. Biraben is a dual citizen of France and Switzerland.

== Publication ==
- Les enfants c'est bien, la pilule aussi (in French). Paris: Éditions du Seuil. 2004. ISBN 2-02-069268-6.

== See also ==
- Le Grand Journal (Canal+)
