= The Gardener (2025 film) =

2025 French comedy action film

- Theatrical release poster
- French: Le jardinier
- Directed by: David Charhon
- Screenplay by: David Charhon; Sebastien Fechner; Vincent de Brus
- Produced by: Sébastien Fechner
- Starring: Jean-Claude Van Damme; Michaël Youn; Nawell Madani; Jérôme Le Banner
- Cinematography: Thierry Arbogast
- Music by: Guillaume Houssais
- Production company: Rose Productions
- Distributed by: Amazon MGM Studios (via Prime Video)
- Release date: 10 January 2025
- Running time: 110 minutes
- Country: France
- Language: French
- Budget: €10,000,000

The Gardener (French: Le Jardinier) is a 2025 French action comedy film directed by David Charhon, with a screenplay by Sébastien Fechner and Vincent De Brus. Produced by Rose Productions, the film follows Leo, a gardener who harbors a critical state secret after finding his name on a government death list. Together, they craft a daring plan to survive. Cast members include Jean-Claude Van Damme, Nawell Madani, Michaël Youn, Jérôme Le Banner, Kaaris, and Elie SemounIvy Carter.

Le Jardinier was released Amazon MGM Studios through Prime Video on 10 January 2025.

== Synopsis ==
Each year, the Prime Minister orchestrates the removal of various individuals deemed threats to state interests. Serge Shuster, a senior official with ties to the Presidency, unexpectedly becomes entangled in a sinister plot that marks him as a target. Faced with inevitable death and a dangerous secret that puts his family at risk, Serge, his wife, and their children must place their trust in an unlikely savior: their enigmatic gardener, Leo.

== Cast ==
- Jean-Claude Van Damme as Leo
- Nawell Madani as Mia Shuster
- Michaël Youn as Serge Shuster
- Jérôme Le Banner as Phoebus
- Rayan Bouazza as Hornet 2
- David Charhon as Didier le chevelu
- Matthias Quiviger as Esmeralda
- Poqssi as Alice Shuster (Carla Poquin)
- Stanislas Carmont as Alexandre
- Kaaris as Quasimodo
- Elie Semoun as Dr. Rouma
- Carl-Philipp Wengler as Hornet 3
- Vincent Desagnat as Policier Ministère

== Production ==
In early 2024, David Charhon officially announced the development of The Gardener. The project was launched with Jean-Claude Van Damme in a leading role, marking a reunion with Charhon after their collaboration on The Last Mercenary (2021).

Filming took place in France and Belgium, concluding in April 2024. Later that year, it was announced that Blue Fox Entertainment had acquired the rights to distribute the film in North America, while Amazon Prime Video secured distribution rights for France and several Eastern European countries. In November 2024, additional distribution agreements were confirmed, with Falcon handling the Middle East, Films4U covering Portugal, Spentzos managing Greece, and Prime Video distributing in Italy and Spain.

== Release and reception ==
Critical response

Delromainzika of Critique Ciné criticized the film for its weak storyline and also expressed disappointment with the cast and characters. He further described the action scenes as poorly choreographed. Ultimately, he gave the film a rating of 2 out of 10. Michel Valentin of Le Parisien gave the film a 2 out of 5-star rating, describing it as a flop. He wrote, "Unfortunately, Jean-Claude Van Damme's performance offers little to respond to, as he is light years away from his successful roles in Lukas (2018) or The Last Mercenary (2021). Inexpressive at best, particularly in the action scenes, which are poorly choreographed, too fragmented, and badly edited."
