= Le Carton =

- Theatrical release poster
- Directed by: Charles Nemes
- Written by: Charles Nemes; Sebastien Fechner
- Produced by: Sebastien Fechner
- Starring: Vincent Desagnat; Bruno Salomone; Armelle Deutsch; Fred Testot; Omar Sy
- Cinematography: Gilles Henry
- Edited by: Dominique Galliéni
- Production companies: Source Films; Warner Bros. France; 2003 Productions; France 2 Cinéma
- Distributed by: Warner Bros. Pictures
- Release date: 6 October 2004
- Running time: 85 minutes
- Country: France
- Language: French
- Budget: €5 million
- Box office: $2,089,964

Le Carton (lit. 'The Box') is a 2004 French comedy film directed by Charles Nemes, based on the play by Clément Michel.

== Cast ==
- Vincent Desagnat as Antoine
- Bruno Salomone as Vincent
- Armelle Deutsch as Marine
- Fred Testot as David
- Omar Sy as Lorenzo
