= Lascars (film) =

- French theatrical release poster
- Directed by: Emmanuel Klotz; Albert Pereira-Lazaro
- Based on: Lascars by Boris Dolivet
- Produced by: Philippe Gompel; Roch Lener
- Starring: Vincent Cassel; Diane Kruger; Omar Sy
- Edited by: Thibaud Caquot
- Music by: Lucien Papalou; Nicholas Varley
- Production companies: Canal Plus; France 2
- Distributed by: BAC Films
- Release date: 17 June 2009
- Running time: 96 minutes
- Countries: France; Germany
- Language: French
- Budget: $11.5 million
- Box office: $4.8 million

Lascars is a 2009 French adult-animated crime black comedy film starring Vincent Cassel, Diane Kruger and Omar Sy. It is a feature film adaptation of the French TV series Les Lascars. The film, which had a budget of €10 million, was co-produced by Canal Plus and France 2 and distributed by BAC Films. The story follows Tony and José, a pair of inept rap artists who attempt to raise money after a mishap scuppers their plan for a Caribbean vacation; as Tony sells cannabis for a dangerous drug lord, José builds a sauna in a judge's mansion and pursues a relationship with the judge's daughter. The film has the alternative English title Round Da Way.

== Plot ==
In the French suburb of Condé-sur-Ginette, aspiring rap artists Tony Merguez and José Frelate prepare for a Caribbean vacation in Santo Rico. Their plans derail when they discover their non-refundable tickets are for the Eastern European locale Svanto Vliko. In a heated moment, Tony accidentally breaks an urn containing the travel agent's grandfather's ashes, forcing the duo to flee. Their misfortune is fodder for ridicule by rivals Sammy and Narbé, who have their own Santo Rico tickets. José's cousin Jenny informs him of a job at the mansion of Judge Santiépi, whose daughter Clémence José is attracted to. He takes the gig and is tasked with building a Norwegian sauna in Santiépi's basement while he is away for the week. He is assisted by Maurice Moktar "Momo" Gnignard, an aspiring filmmaker whom Santiépi had sentenced to community service. Meanwhile, Tony, trying to raise money for proper tickets, takes out a loan of cannabis from the brutish drug lord Zoran, agreeing to sell it within a week. Sammy and Narbé's drunken antics get them ejected from the airport, so they spend the next two weeks at a local water park, pretending that it is Santo Rico for social clout. José, preoccupied with the sauna and knowing how dangerous Zoran is, implores Tony to return the cannabis. While distracting Clémence from a mess in the basement, José secures a date with her. Tony recruits Casimir to sell half the cannabis, but Tony's nymphomanic girlfriend Manuella, who had just moved in, delays him. He is late to a deal and finds that his buyers have sourced directly from Zoran, leaving Tony stuck with his share. He calls Zoran and suggests returning his half, but Zoran threatens him.

Tony is detained by police while awaiting Casimir and is brought to a surprise party celebrating Manuella's police academy graduation. Tony narrowly escapes with his duffel bag of cannabis, but faces Manuella's intent to marry him. José, Clémence and Momo dine at a kebab restaurant, where José learns that Clémence will be going to Santo Rico the following week. Casimir, at the same restaurant after selling his share, sparks a brawl over a delayed order. Momo steals Casimir's money in the chaos, and Clémence and José share a kiss while escaping. Tony attempts to dump Manuella, but she restrains him. The next day, Casimir arrives and frees Tony, and the two escape Manuella's wrath. Tony hides at the mansion and helps José finish the sauna while secretly selling his cannabis. Upon the sauna's completion, Tony learns that José has accepted an invitation from Clémence to join her in Santo Rico. Momo uses the stolen money to bribe pornographic film producer John Boolman to film his script at the water park. Sammy and Narbé, upon emerging, are spontaneously put in charge of props by Boolman. Production is soon shut down for lack of clearance.

José discovers Tony's cannabis and flushes it when Manuella arrives searching for him. After she leaves, José angrily throws Tony out of the mansion for his stubbornness, forcing Tony to call Zoran and confess his loss. Zoran storms into Tony's apartment and is ambushed by Manuella, who mistakes Zoran for Tony in the darkness and has sex with him. Clémence grants Momo permission to finish filming at the mansion, but a mishap with sea urchins dropped by Narbé leads to Momo removing spines from her. When José calls Clémence, her phone is answered by Boolman, and José misinterprets the commotion of the spine removal as infidelity. Heartbroken, José throws a massive paid-entry party at the mansion to help Tony repay Zoran. A gang of Arabs, whose car was totaled during Manuella's rampage, traps Tony in the sauna, where his attempt to open the door spikes the temperature. Manuella, finally discovering her mistake, throws Zoran out. The film crew arrives at the mansion, where José accuses Clémence of unfaithfulness. After she storms out and Momo clears up the misunderstanding, José unsuccessfully tries to apologize before she drives away. Meanwhile, Tony tips Zoran off to his location while calling for help and then desperately calls Manuella afterward. Zoran, armed with a chainsaw, breaks Tony out of the sauna and prepares to kill him. José intervenes, and as Tony pleads, he insults Manuella just as she appears. She dumps Tony and arrests Zoran, and they hook up in her police car. Santiépi returns and is enraged to find his mansion trashed. As Clémence and José reconcile, a gas leak and the overheated sauna cause an explosion that partially destroys the mansion. Tony and José, sentenced to community service by Santiépi, perform in a moralistic rap video to be shown at police stations and youth detention centers.

== Cast ==
- Vincent Cassel as Tony Merguez
- IZM as José Frelate
- Fred Testot as Sammy
- Omar Sy as Narbé
- Gilles Lellouche as Zoran
- Frédérique Bel as Manuella Lardu
- Franck Sinius as Casimir
- Diane Kruger as Clémence Santiépi
- Diam's as Jenny Frelate
- Hafid F. Benamar as Maurice Moktar "Momo" Gnignard
- François Levantal as Judge Santiépi
- Vincent Desagnat as John Boolman
- Éric Judor as a Chinese travel agent and an airport security guard
- Katsuni as Brigitte

== Reception ==
On French review aggregator AlloCiné, Lascars has an average rating of 3.9/5 from 21 reviews.
