= Lascars (TV series) =

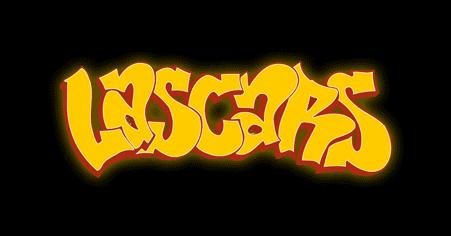
- Genre: Adult animation; Animated sitcom; Black comedy; Jukebox musical; Action-adventure
- Created by: Boris "El Diablo" Dolivet
- Country of origin: France
- Original language: French
- No. of seasons: 2
- No. of episodes: 60 (+ 1 unaired pilot)

Production
- Running time: 1 minutes

Original release
- Network: Canal +
- Release: 1998 – 2007

Lascars (English: Homiez) is a French adult-animated television series created by Boris "El Diablo" Dolivet. It was aired on the French TV channel Canal+ for the first time in 1998, but ran for nearly 10 years. This series spawned two seasons, the first one in 1998 and the second in 2007, a pilot for a project of a 20-minute series, a comic and a 2009 film adaptation. The episodes follow the mishaps of young diverse men living in an inner-city district. The series is rife with urban culture, and most of the voice cast are French hip-hop rappers.

== See also ==
- Lascars (film)
