= Stuck Together =

- Netflix release poster
- French: 8 Rue de l'Humanite
- Directed by: Dany Boon
- Written by: Laurence Arné; Dany Boon
- Story by: Dany Boon
- Starring: Dany Boon; Liliane Rovère; Yvan Attal
- Cinematography: Glynn Speeckaert
- Edited by: Hervé de Luze
- Music by: Alexandre Lecluyse
- Production companies: Inver Tax Shelter; Netflix Studios
- Distributed by: Netflix
- Release date: 20 October 2021
- Running time: 125 minutes
- Country: France
- Language: French

Stuck Together (French: 8 Rue de l'Humanité; lit. 'No.8 Humanity Street') is a 2021 French comedy film directed by Dany Boon, written by Laurence Arné and Dany Boon and starring Dany Boon, Liliane Rovère and Yvan Attal. It was released on 20 October 2021 by Netflix.

== Plot ==
Due to the COVID-19 pandemic and containment, the streets of Paris are deserted. While some have fled in the provinces, seven families remain in their building at 8 rue de l'Humanité in the 11th arrondissement. Among the inhabitants of the building are in particular the owner of the bistro who is doing everything to open her establishment, an ambitious scientist wanting to find the vaccine, a hypochondriac and his lawyer wife who is trying to reconcile her professional life and her family life, a sports coach who gives his lessons by videoconference but begins to gain weight, his 7-month pregnant partner who goes viral with an anti-COVID song. There is also a self-made man who is successful in business but finds out that he does not even have the grade level of his 8 year old son. This confinement also has positive effects: During these three months of confinement, all these inhabitants will experience joys and anxieties, discover each other, get closer, argue and reconcile.

== Cast ==
- Dany Boon as Martin
- Liliane Rovère as Louise
- Yvan Attal as Gabriel
- Laurence Arné as Claire
- François Damiens as Tony
- Alison Wheeler as Agathe
- Tom Leeb as Samuel
- Jorge Calvo as Diego
- Nawell Madani as Leïla
- Myriam Bourguignon as Isabelle
- Élie Semoun as policeman
- Randiane Naly as policewoman
- Eve Margnat as Victoire
- Clara Cirera as Paola
- Nick Mukuko as policeman
- Yann Papin as policeman
- Lucas Phiv as Kevin Louison
- Milo Machado-Graner as Basile
- Rose de Kervenoaël as Louna
- Isabelle de Hertogh as The client
