= Flunked (TV series) =

Fench TV Series

Flunked (Recalé - literally, 'Rejected' - in the French original) is a French television comedy series created and directed by François Uzan.

The series is produced by Itinéraire Production for Netflix; it was initially broadcast on 23 April 2026.

== Synopsis ==
Eddy, a con artist with a knack for mathematics, is arrested but offered a choice by Lucie, the police officer in charge of his case: serve a seven-year prison sentence or go undercover for the final three weeks of the school year as a contract teacher at a high school in the Hauts-de-France region in order to identify the child of a Russian mobster among the students. Initially reluctant, Eddy seizes the opportunity to reconnect with Tiphaine, his childhood sweetheart, who has become the school's principal.

== Cast ==
- Alexandre Kominek: Eddy / Édouard Martin
- Laurence Arné: Lucie
- Fred Testot: Fabien
- Mathilde Seigner: Eddy's mother
- Joséphine de Meaux: Viviane
- Sabrina Ouazani: Nora
- Gustave Kervern: Gilbert
- Bérangère McNeese: Laurence
- Leslie Medina: Tiphaine
- Yannik Landrein: Pablo
- Jean-Claude Muaka: Florian
- Cypriane Gardin: Océane
- Julien Ghestem: Kylian
- Eva Khelifi: Sandra
- Ève Leclercq: Louise
- Marcello Favel: Théo
- Anis Bencheikh: Benjamin
- Justine Grave: Justine
- Delcho Koprivshki: Anton Sagirov
