= Laurence Arné =

French actress, comedian and writer (born 1982)

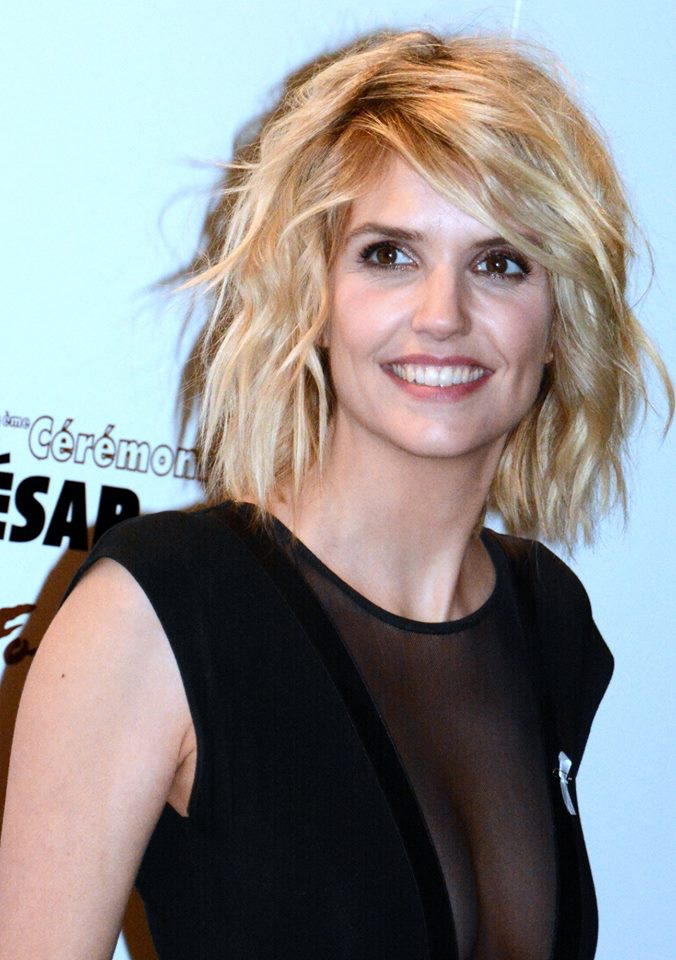
- Laurence Arné in 2018
- Born: 4 February 1982 (age 44); Angoulême, Charente, France
- Occupations: Actress, comedian, writer
- Years active: 2006–present

Laurence Arné (born 4 February 1982) is a French actress, comedian and writer.

== Filmography ==
Year	Title	Role	Director	Notes
2010	L'amour, c'est mieux à deux	Claudine	Dominique Farrugia & Arnaud Lemort	
2010	Le grand moment de solitude	Marie	Wilfried Méance	Short
2010	Au bas de l'échelle	Iris	Arnauld Mercadier	TV film
2011	Moi, Michel G., milliardaire, maître du monde	Déborah Ganiant	Stéphane Kazandjian	
2011	Demain c'est la fin du monde	Lilly	Arthur Delaire & Quentin Reynaud	Short
2011	Le problème c'est que...	Julie	Wilfried Méance (2)	Short
2011	Le client	Aline Vivier	Arnauld Mercadier (2)	TV film
2012	Mais Qui a tué Pamela Rose?	Linda	Olivier Baroux & Kad Merad	
2012	Un jour mon père viendra	Suzanne	Martin Valente	
2012	Bowling	Louise	Marie-Castille Mention-Schaar	
2012	Dépression et des potes	Laura	Arnaud Lemort (2)	
2012	Transparence	The secretary	Martin Guyot & Ivan Rousseau	Short
2012	Après toi	Julie	Wilfried Méance (3)	Short
2012–present	WorkinGirls	Déborah Vernon	Sylvain Fusée	TV series (37 episodes)
2014	À coup sûr	Emma Dorian	Delphine de Vigan	
2015	Our Futures	Emma	Rémi Bezançon	
2016	Radin!	Valérie	Fred Cavayé	
2018	La Ch'tite famille	Constance	Dany Boon	
2019	La part du soupçon	Alice	Christophe Lamotte	
2021	Stuck Together	Claire	Dany Boon	
2026	Flunked (TV series)	Lucie	François Uzan	

== Theatre ==
Year	Title	Author	Director	Notes
2006–07	Quelle conne	Laurence Arné	Alexandre Delimoges	Théâtre Le Bout
2008	Solos du Juste Pour Rire Show	Laurence Arné	Alexandre Delimoges (2)	Théâtre de Dix-Heures
2008	Open Bed	Laurent Ruquier	Laurent Ruquier	Théâtre des Bouffes-Parisiens
2009–2010	Laurence Arné	Laurence Arné	Morgan Spillemaecker	Théâtre des Blancs-Manteaux
