= On the Other Side of the Tracks =

- Directed by: David Charhon
- Screenplay by: David Charhon; Remy Four; Julien War
- Story by: Éric and Nicolas Altmayer; Alexis Dolivet; Laurent Lafitte
- Produced by: Éric and Nicolas Altmayer
- Starring: Omar Sy; Laurent Lafitte
- Cinematography: Alain Duplantier
- Edited by: Stéphane Pereira
- Music by: Ludovic Bource
- Distributed by: Mars Distribution
- Release date: 19 December 2012
- Running time: 96 minutes
- Country: France
- Language: French
- Budget: $8.4 million
- Box office: $33.5 million

On the Other Side of the Tracks (French: De l'autre côté du périph) is a French comedy film released in France on 19 December 2012 and picked up for US distribution by The Weinstein Company. It was released in the US on April 4, 2014. On the Other Side of the Tracks is the story of two very different police officers who team up after a business mogul's wife is murdered. A sequel titled The Takedown was released on 6 May 2022 on Netflix.

== Plot ==
When bad boy police officer Ousmane is involved in a car accident, he is mistaken for the assailant by his fellow police officers. The next day, the wife of a business mogul turns up nearby Ousmane's housing project. Ousmane draws connections between the two crimes and believes he is able to solve both crimes. In order to be heard by fellow police officers, Ousmane is forced to team up with visiting Parisian investigator Francois Monge, who has much more departmental clout. Despite coming from and working in very different neighborhoods, the pair find common ground through their policing style, including manhandling suspects and kicking butt.

== Cast ==
- Omar Sy as Ousmane Diakhité
- Laurent Lafitte as François Monge
- Sabrina Ouazani as Yasmine
- Lionel Abelanski as Daniel Cardinet
- Youssef Hajdi as Giovanni / Nabil
- Maxime Motte as Van Gogh
- Léo Léothier as Gérard
- André Marcon as Chaligny
- Zabou Breitman as Commissaire Morland
- Patrick Bonnel as Balard
- Roch Leibovici as Patrick
- Rebecca Azan as Laurence
- Tchewk Essafi as Samir (as Tchewik Essafi)
- Patrick Kodjo Topou as Tyson
- Samuel Goreini as Sam
- Katia Tchenko as The keeper of the Aviary

== Release ==
The film was released in the United States on 4 April 2014, opening on 50 screens.
