= Chassol =

French composer (born 1976)

Christophe Chassol
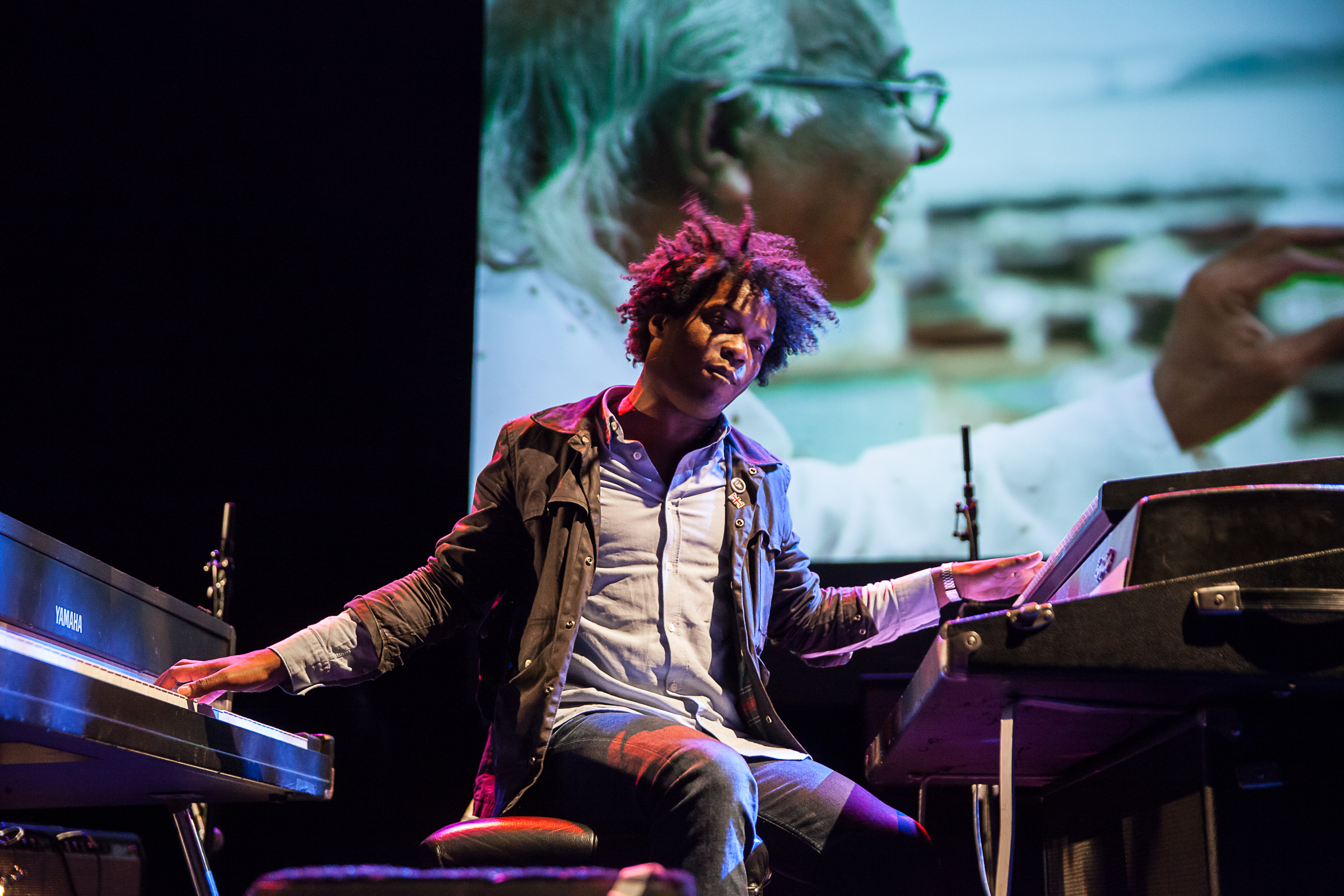
- Chassol performing at James Lavelle’s Meltdown Festival, 2014

Background information
- Born: Christophe Chassol; 1976 (age 49–50); Issy-les-Moulineaux, France
- Origin: Paris, France
- Occupations: Composer, pianist, arranger, musical director
- Instruments: Piano, keyboards
- Years active: 1994–present
- Labels: Tricatel

Christophe Chassol (born 1976) is a French composer, pianist, arranger and musical director. He is known for developing ultrascore, an approach that combines recorded voices and environmental sound with musical composition, often synchronized with video.

Chassol has collaborated with artists including Solange and Frank Ocean, contributing to projects including Ocean’s visual album Endless as listed in published album credits, and has contributed to various film and television projects, including the Netflix series Represent (En Place).

== Early life and education ==
Chassol was born in Issy-les-Moulineaux, France. He has described a family background connected to Martinique and early exposure to music. From the age of four, he studied piano at Institut National de Musique, Paris. 16 years later he moved to America, where he studied at Berklee College of Music, Boston, focusing on composition and film scoring. His earlier influences were Steve Reich and Hermeto Pascoal.

== Artistic approach ==
Chassol’s ultrascore method involves recording speech and environmental sounds and using them as material for harmony and rhythm, often aligned to edited video footage. He has described the approach as “harmonizing reality.”

== Career ==
=== Key projects ===
- Indiamore (2013) — audiovisual project filmed in India.
- Big Sun (2015) — project connected to Martinique and field recordings.
- Ludi (2020).

=== Film and television ===
Chassol has composed music for film and television, including the Netflix series Represent (En Place), created by Jean-Pascal Zadi. He has also been credited for work connected to Zadi’s film Tout simplement noir.

=== Commissions and institutional projects ===
In 2019, Chassol composed and performed a commissioned work for a Cartier holiday event in Paris; the music was later released as The Message of Xmas. He has discussed his relationship with music and collaboration in interviews, including with Bridge.audio.

=== Live performances and exhibitions ===
Chassol performed Chassol Plays Basquiat at the Philharmonie de Paris in 2023; the performance was broadcast by ARTE. He has also presented work in institutional contexts, including Studio Venezia at the Venice Biennale (2017). In 2023, he created Les Marguerites Gaumont par Chassol at La Gaîté Lyrique in Paris.

== Collaborations ==
Chassol has contributed to recordings and projects involving artists including Solange and Frank Ocean, including work on Ocean’s visual album Endless as listed in published album credits.

== Discography (selected) ==
- X-Pianos (2012)
- Indiamore (2013)
- Big Sun (2015)
- Ultrascores (2014)
- Ultrascores II (2016)
- Ludi (2020)
- The Message of Xmas (2019/2021)
- Chassol Plays Basquiat (2024, live album)

== Filmography (selected) ==
- Dark Touch (2012)
- Lamb (2015)
- Vanille (2020)
- Tout simplement noir (2020)
- Represent (En Place) (Netflix, 2023–2024)
- Le Faux Soir (in production)

== Recognition ==
Chassol was a laureate of FAIR and received the Deezer–Adami award (2014).
