= Jérôme Niel =

French humorist, choreographer, writer, comedian and video producer

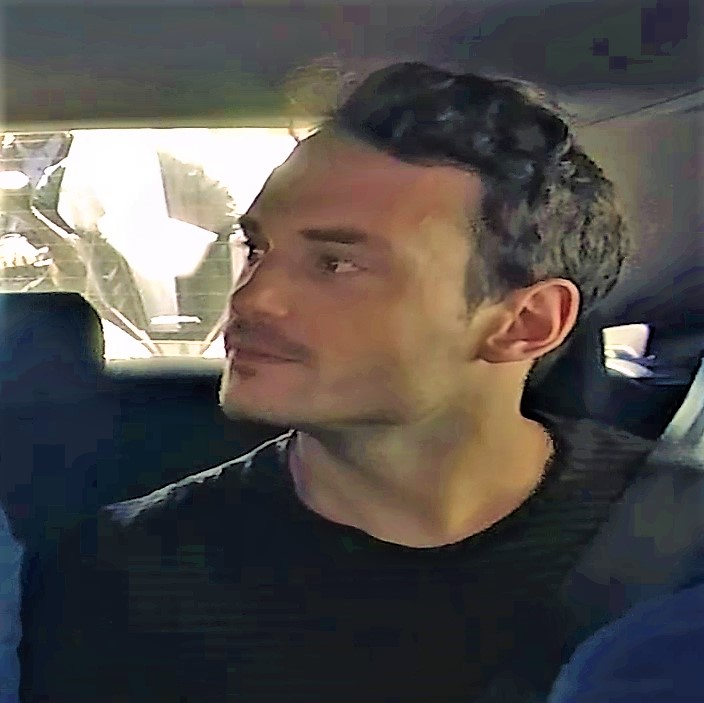
Jérôme Niel

Jerôme Niel (also known as Jérôme Puydebat, born on 14 June 1985) is a French humorist, choreographer, writer, comedian and video producer working among other things for the French cable TV channel Canal+.

== Background ==
Niel was born in Trappes in the Yvelines. After passing his French baccalauréat with a specialization in economics and social sciences, he worked as a salesman in gardening tools. He went on to study languages at university for two and a half months. A few months later, he joined a radio school. Having arrived in Paris he worked for RMC as a switchboarder to pay his rent. In Paris, he began uploading his videos on YouTube and was noticed by MTV, for which he shot forty episodes.

In May 2013, Le Grand Journal noticed Jérôme's web series Groom Service in Montreux and hired him to make episodes with stars of the Cannes Film Festival. Although Michel Denisot had stopped presenting Le Grand Journal, Jérôme continued to work for the channel, creating a miniseries named Les Tutos, already present on the internet through the Studio Bagel. In September 2014, he went on to work for Canal + with the creation of a miniseries called Speakerine broadcast daily in Le Grand Journal, which centers around the humorous analysis of one of that night's TV programs on French television. Niel takes part in the video Imagine Paris, in which with some thirty other YouTubers, he covers John Lennon's song "Imagine".
