= Jean-Claude Muaka =

French comedian and actor (born 1986)

Jean-Claude Muaka is a French comedian and actor who was born on November 14, 1986. He has made a name for himself in classic plays, stand-up comedy, and in cinema.

== Biography ==
Jean-Claude Muaka was born in Villeneuve-Saint-Georges, his family moved to Vaux-le-Pénil, in Seine-et-Marne, when he was 7 years old. His father is a Physician, and his mother is a nurse; both are from the Democratic Republic of the Congo.

He studied theatre at the Sorbonne-Nouvelle where he met Director Éric Checco. The latter offered him to play Othello at the 2008 Avignon Festival.

Years later, he decided to focus on solo performance. His first show, One Man Costaud was played at the Paris Apollo théâtre and at the Palais des Glaces in 2015.

A die-hard supporter of Paris Saint Germain, he created Coach Muaka, an imaginary character who comments and depicts PSG and French National Soccer Selection games on social media and at his shows in 2015.

In 2016, Jean-Claude Muaka joined the cast of the Jamel Comedy Club on TV, and toured.

== Career ==
=== Shows ===
- 2015: One Man Costaud
- 2019: Ce soir ou jamais
- 2023: Represent

=== Movies ===
- 2017: Sous le même toit
- 2019: Anna

== Notes and references ==
- Christophe Lacaze-Eslous, Coupe de France : Jean-Claude Muaka enchaîne les passes et les vannes, Le Parisien
- Boris Colombet, Jean-Claude Muaka en One Man Costaud, France-Antilles
- Jean-Claude Muaka at IMDb
