= L'Alpe d'Huez Film Festival =

French film festival

- Location: Alpe d'Huez, France
- Founded: 1997
- Awards: Grand Prix; Prix de coeur du jury Prix spécial du jury Prix du public Prix d'interprétation féminine Prix d'interprétation masculin Prix du court métrage
- Website: festival-alpedhuez.com

L'Alpe d'Huez Film Festival, established in 1997, is a film festival dedicated to comedy cinema. It takes place every year in Alpe d'Huez during the third week of January and offers a free program and free entrance composed of many screenings, short and feature films. The screenings take place all day in the halls of the Palais des Sports et Congresses of Alpe d'Huez. The films of the official selection, in competition and out of competition, are projected in national preview in the presence of the casts and crews of the films.
