= Nawell Madani =

Belgian humorist

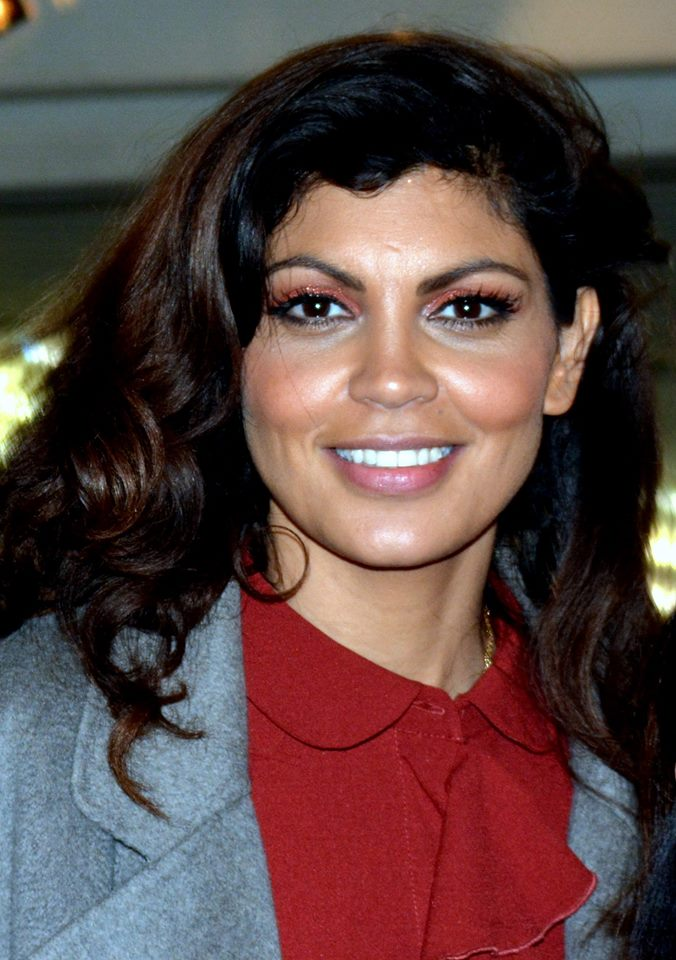
- Born: October 25, 1979 (age 47); Watermael-Boitsfort, Belgium
- Occupations: Comedian, television presenter, producer

Nawell Madani (born 25th October 1979 in Watermael-Boitsfort, Belgium) is an Algerian-Belgian comedian, television presenter and producer. She first received wide recognition in 2012 due to the Jamel Comedy Club.

== Biography ==
Born to Algerian parents, Nawel grew up in Belgium in a family of 6 children. She suffered third-degree burns at the age of 2, and was a tomboy for most of her childhood and adolescence. Her father is a taxi driver and her mother is a nurse.

She moved to Paris at the age of 21, at first with the ambition to become a professional choreographer and dancer, returned to Belgium, and left again. After several tours as a choreographer, she gave up this career: "the artistic directors asked us to wear a bikini. They don’t give a damn about the dance", she declared. She was briefly an artistic director of a nightclub in Antwerp. She discovered the theatre and wanted to become an actress. At the end of 2008, she joined the Studio Pygmalion where she trained for a few months. She also followed courses taught by Damien Acoca, and those of the “Laboratory of the Actor” directed by Hélène Zidi-Chéruy. This was how she was spotted in a small room, The Pranzo, by the artistic director of the Jamel Comedy Club who invited her to a casting to join the team created by Jamel Debbouze. Madani was the only woman to join the team. In September 2011 she began her career as a comedian. She left this troupe six months later: "I thought to join a big family, I discovered a world full of ego and competition".

On Télé Sud, she hosted the programme Backstage, where she received artists such as Rick Ross, Shaggy, Wyclef Jean, Kery James, Nas and Chris Brown. In 2011, she presented the programme Shake Your Body on MTV with Cut Killer. In September 2012, she joined as a commentator the team of Grand Journal which was being renewed. In 2013, she founded the collective Jam’Girls, a television programme which met a new generation of female comedians, broadcast on Chérie 25 and Comédie. In 2014 she went for her first one-woman show, C'est moi la plus belge ("I am more Belgian"), in the Palais des Glaces in Paris and did the tour of the Zeniths in France. She talked about taboo subjects, such as the virginity of North African women, or homosexuality. She took a place in the festival Juste pour rire of Montreal in July 2014.

In 2015, she won Best One-Man Show in the Globe de Cristal Awards.

== Filmography ==
Year	Title	Role	Director	Notes
2012	Boulevard du Palais	Saïda Bouati	Christian Bonnet	TV series (1 episode)
2012	Lascars	Sylvie	Tristan Aurouet	TV series (2 episodes)
2017	Alibi.com	Cynthia	Philippe Lacheau	
2017	C'est tout pour moi	Lila	Nawell Madani & Ludovic Colbeau-Justin	
2021	Stuck Together	Leïla	Dany Boon	
2021	L'enfant de personne	Myriam	Akim Isker	TV movie
2023	La tête dans les étoiles	Nathalie	Emmanuel Gillibert	
2023	Jusqu'ici tout va bien	Fara	Nawell Madani & Lionel Smila	TV series (8 episodes)
2025	The Gardener	Mia Shuster	David Charhon	

== Awards and nominations ==
Year	Award	Nominated work	Result
2015	Globe de Cristal Award for Best Stand-Up	C'est moi la plus belge	Won
2018	Magritte Award for Most Promising Actress	C'est tout pour moi	Nominated
