= Lucienne Moreau =

French actress (1933–2022)

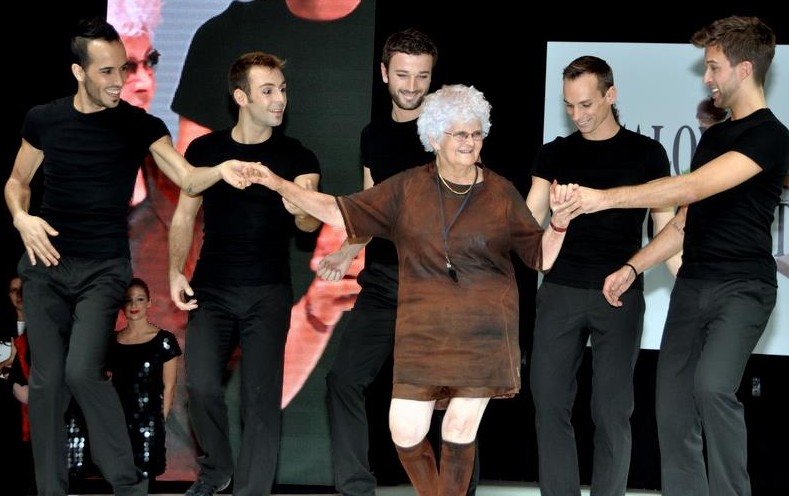
- Moreau (middle) in 2012
- Born: 17 February 1933; Renazé, France
- Died: 16 January 2022 (aged 88); Paris, France
- Occupation: Actress

Lucienne Moreau (17 February 1933 – 16 January 2022) was a French actress. She was best known for her appearances on Groland and Le Petit Journal on Canal+.

== Biography ==
For most of her professional career, Moreau served as a security guard. In 1992, she moved to Argenteuil and, in 2000, responded to a newspaper advertisement for taking pictures. She was then offered more roles from advertisers and built up an acting résumé. She joined a marketing agency for seniors called Masters Models as well as the publicity agency Leg. Thanks to these agencies, she was able to acquire roles in advertising for the likes of Eurostar.

Moreau went on to appear in roles in television and film, such as those on Groland and Le Petit Journal, in which she had her own segment titled "The Lucienne Live Report". In December 2010, she participated in David Ken's LOL project, disguised as Mrs. Claus. During the 2010 Christmas holiday, she held a segment on Le Petit Journal titled " Lucienne a lu", alongside Yann Barthès. Throughout the 2010s, she took on many roles in advertising campaigns and became known for such appearances.

Lucien Moreau died in Paris on 16 January 2022, at the age of 88.

== Filmography ==
=== Cinema ===
- Who Killed Bambi? (2003)
- Wedding Unplanned (2017)
- Rolling to You (2018)

=== Television ===
- Groland (1992)
- Le Kad & O Show (2001)
- H (2002)
- Le Petit Journal (2010–2011)
- Les Lolies (2014)

=== Short films ===
- Les Petits Hommes vieux (2005)
- Je suis un chic type (2011)
- Mamie Mia ! (2012)
- Hénaut Président (2012)
- Je suis off (2016)
- En tout bien (2018)

=== Advertisements ===
- Cetelem (2010)
- Institute of Internet and Multimedia (2011)
- Adrexo (2011)
- AdopteUnMec (2012)"Lucienne, la mémé de Yann Barthès, adopte un mec !". Staragora (in French). 14 July 2012. Archived from the original on 24 September 2015.
- NRJ Mobile/Crédit Mutuel (2012)
- Eurostar (2013)
- L'Oréal (2013)
- Ministry of Finance (2014)
- Café Grand-mère (2018)
