= Laura Haim =

French-American journalist

- Born: May 20, 1966 (age 60); Paris, France
- Occupation: Journalist
- Writing career
- Pen name: Laurence Haïm

Laura Haim (or Laurence Haïm, as she is known in France) is a French-American journalist. She was born on May 20, 1966, in Paris, France.

== Career ==
=== Pre-Obama ===
She was a former correspondent at the CAPA agency in Washington (led by Hervé Chabalier) where she worked between 1989 and 1995. She was one of the first journalists there and was associated with the production of programs like "24 hours" on Canal +, "Envoyé spécial" (the French 60 Minutes) on France 2, and "Zone interdite" on M6. As a foreign correspondent for CAPA, she covered international events such as the famine in Somalia, the beginning of the war in Bosnia, and the situation in Israel, the West Bank, and Gaza.

In 1992, Haim moved to New York to pursue her interest in working in the U.S. She created the first office for Canal Plus Group, where she worked as a correspondent until 2001. After September 11, 2001, Haim was sent on assignment to Israel. A suicide bombing occurred there, which she began documenting. At the time, Dan Rather of CBS News was also on location. After meeting her, he decided to hire her to work as a producer and video journalist for CBS News.

From 2002 to 2006, Haim was mainly based in Baghdad, where she covered the Iraq war and the Near East for CBS.

=== Obama's campaign and presidential mandate ===
Haim went back to the United States in October 2006. At that point, she suggested to Canal Plus that she follow Barack Obama's campaign. In 2008, she became an accredited White House and Pentagon correspondent for Canal Plus Group and moved to Washington, D.C., to follow the Obama administration on a daily basis. In June 2009, she conducted another interview with President Obama, which aired on Canal +. She also covered the sex scandal involving Dominique Strauss-Khan, the former managing director of the IMF who wanted to run for president in France.

Haim covered news and became a regular face on the 24-hour cable news channel of Canal Plus, I-Télé, which aired in over 60 French-speaking countries, including those in Africa. She also founded the first group for the foreign White House correspondents accredited to the White House. From 2009 to 2014 she was twice elected president of the White House Foreign Press Association by her peers.

Haim is known for being the only French journalist who has conducted three interviews with Barack Obama during his time as senator and president.

=== Trump's campaign and presidential mandate ===
In April 2015, she offered to cover Donald Trump's campaign for Canal Plus. Shortly thereafter, she became the only permanent accredited European journalist for the Trump campaign abroad from August 2016 until his election. In 2015 Laura obtained an interview with Israeli prime minister Benjamin Netanyahu during the war in Gaza, and was also the only French journalist able to do so. In 2016 she also did an interview for French television with one of the Navy Seals who said he killed Osama bin Laden during the raid.

She has also traveled to Guantanamo on more than eight occasions to document the 9/11 pre-trials.

=== The French presidential campaign with Emmanuel Macron ===
To the surprise of many, Haim was offered the position of spokesperson for international affairs for Emmanuel Macron's presidential campaign, and she joined his team in December 2016. On July 12, 2017, after President Macron's campaign, Haim decided to come back to the United States and join as a fellow the Institute of Political Studies at the University of Chicago's Institute of Politics, headed by David Axelrod, a former adviser to Barack Obama. BACK TO THE USA FOREIGN CONTRIBUTOR : She later returned to Washington and produced a documentary about Melania Trump for Mediawan. In 2020, she covered the U.S. presidential election and reported live from the Capitol on January 6, 2021. Her footage of TV equipment being destroyed was syndicated worldwide.

FOREIGN CONTRIBUTOR AND DIRECTOR She was then offered a contributor role covering the war in Ukraine for the 24-hour news channel LCI. In September 2024, she met French director Luc Besson, who, along with Virginie Silla, decided to produce her documentary that she filmed herself on Trump's presidential campaign." Donald Trump, God, and His People" aired in prime time on France Télévisions on November 5. The network then hired her to report for its 24 hours News channel France Info on the Trump administration as an editorialist for an evening prime-time program focused on the U.S.

After January 20, when she proposed relocating to the U.S. to cover the Trump administration, the channel refused, offering her to continue from Paris instead. She declined and left. Now on a self-declared “breaking break,” she refuses interviews and has been critical of the 24-hour TV news cycle.People follow her on X, where she has 297,000 followers.

== Awards ==
In 2013 and 2014 she was named in France Best Foreign Correspondent and also received the award "Femme en Or, Media Woman of the Year". The news magazine France-Amérique featured her as one of the most important French people living in the U.S.

She was made Chevalier de La Legion d'Honneur in 2015 for her serious journalism and work in the U.S.

== Documentaries ==
=== Documentaries for French TV ===
- 2006: Fire Island
- 2007, April: Darfur ER with George Clooney (45 minutes). Envoyé spécial
- 2008: No Access (55min). CAPA
- 2010: Full Access (1h17). CAPA
- 2012: Obama, La dernière campagne (1h10). CAPA
- 2016: Election américaine: Showtime! (54min). CAPA. 2019: Looking for Melania (61min).MEDIAWAN. 2024: Donald Trump, Dieu et les siens ( 61 min) LUC BESSON

== Bibliography ==
- Journal d'une année à part : 11 septembre 2001-11 septembre 2002, Paris: La Martinière, 2002, p. 301 ISBN 2-84675-039-4
- Les Bombes humaines : Enquête au cœur du conflit israélo-palestinien, Paris: La Martinière, 2003, p. 223 ISBN 2-84675-041-6
- Une Française à New-York, Paris: Robert Laffont, 2007, p. 201 ISBN 978-2-221-10619-8
- Obama président : Saison 1, Paris: Éditions du Moment, 2010, p. 232 ISBN 978-2-35417-088-2
- Made in France : La présidentielle dans l'œil américain, (photogr. Charles Ommanney) Paris: Albin Michel, 2012, p. 173 ISBN 978-2-226-20822-4
