= Jean-Pascal Zadi =

French director, actor and rapper (born 1980)

- Zadi at the Series Mania in 2026
- Born: 22 August 1980 (age 46); Bondy, France
- Occupations: Director; actor; rapper
- Years active: 1999–present

Jean-Pascal Zadi (born 22 August 1980 in Bondy) is a French director, actor and rapper. In 1999, he founded a rap group, La Cellule, with his brother Alain and his friend Stéphane. In 2021, he received the César Award for Most Promising Actor for his performance in Simply Black, which he also wrote and directed.

== Filmography ==
=== As actor ===
Year	Title	Role	Notes
2014	Le Crocodile du Botswanga	Cameraman	
2017	Coexister	The Rapper	
2018	Taxi 5	Rasta Weed	
2018	A Man in a Hurry	The Waiter	
2018	Nicky Larson et le parfum de Cupidon	Monaco Policeman	
2019	Cherif	Bruno Duteil	Episode: "Pièce à convictions"
2019–2020	Craignos	Ernesto	Miniseries
2020	Simply Black	JP	
2021	Carrément craignos	Ernesto	Miniseries
2022	Final Cut	Fatih	
2022	Smoking Causes Coughing	Mercure	
2022	Year of the Shark	Blaise	
2023–present	En place	Stéphane Blé	TV series
2023	Yo mama	Dozingo	
2024	Dans la peau de Blanche Houellebecq	Himself	
2024	Dog on Trial	Marc	
2024	Beating Hearts	Lionel	

=== As filmmaker ===
Year	Title	Director	Screenwriter	Notes
2011	Sans pudeur ni morale	Yes	Yes	Co-written with Camille Moulonguet
2019–2020	Craignos	Yes	Yes	Miniseries
2020	Simply Black	Yes	Yes	Co-directed with John Wax
2021	Carrément craignos	Yes	Yes	Miniseries
2023–present	En place	Yes	Yes	TV series

== Accolades ==
Award	Date of ceremony	Category	Film	Result	Ref.
César Awards	12 March 2021	Most Promising Actor	Simply Black	Won	
César Awards	12 March 2021	Best First Film	Simply Black	Nominated	
Lumière Awards	19 January 2021	Best Male Revelation	Simply Black	Nominated	
Lumière Awards	19 January 2021	Best First Film	Simply Black	Nominated	
