= Marylin Maeso =

French philosopher and teacher

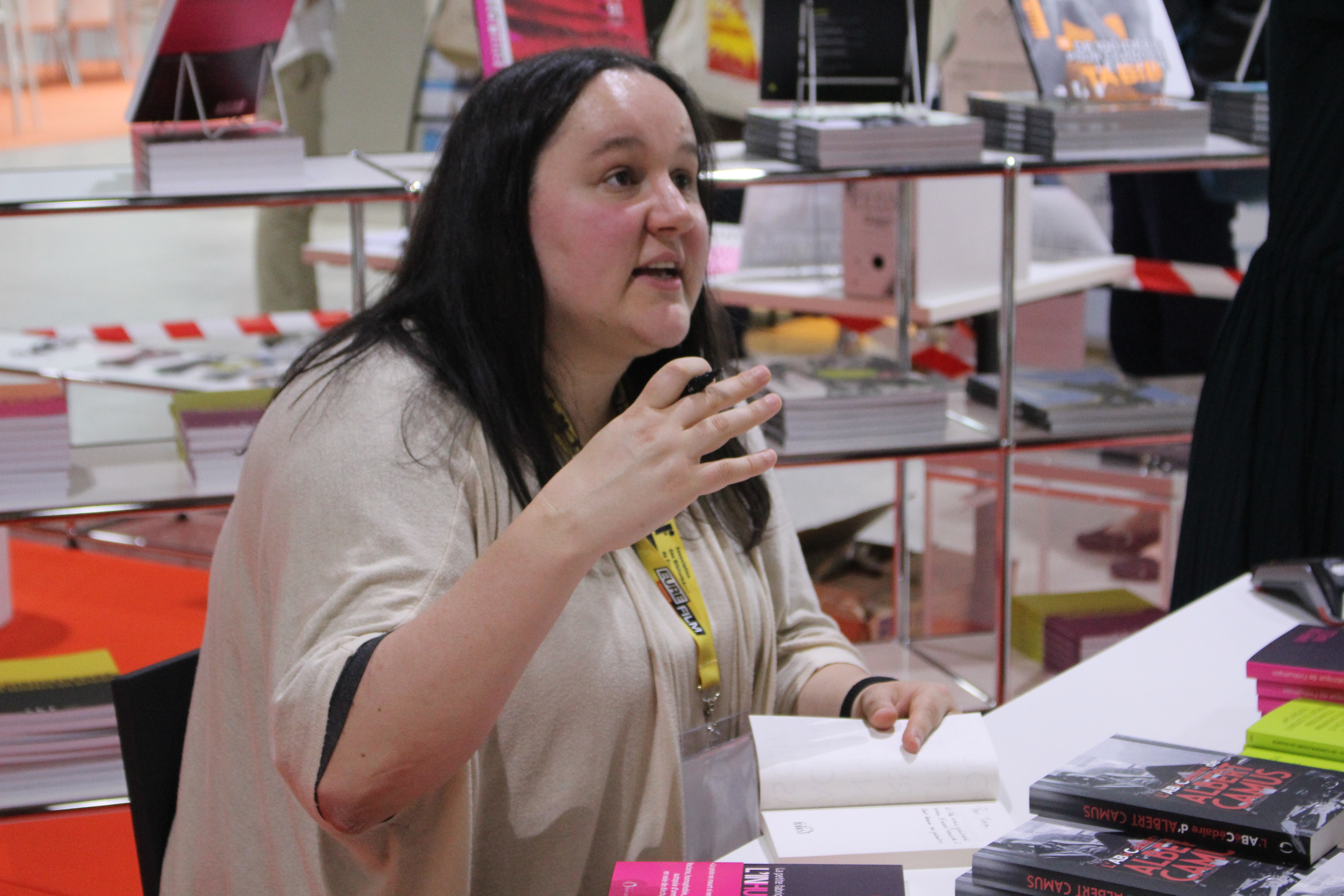

Marylin Maeso (born 13 January 1988) is a French philosopher and teacher, known as a specialist on Albert Camus.

She is an antiracist.

== Education ==
Maeso was born in Montpellier. A graduate of the École normale supérieure where she completed an agrégation in philosophy.

== Camus ==
Marylin Maeso first discovered Camus (The Myth of Sisyphus) while studying for her Baccalauréat in London.

== Teaching & medias ==
Whilst working as a high school philosophy teacher, Maeso has authored a number of books as well as making media appearances and contributions to Le Point and Le Monde. She is a university philosophy lecturer in Orléans. Her book Les conspirateurs du silence is based on Camus's essay Le témoin de la liberté (The Witness of Freedom), published in December 1948 in La Gauche.

== Bibliography ==
- Les conspirateurs du silence, Éditions de l'observatoire, 2018, ISBN 979-10-329-0165-6
- L'Abécédaire d'Albert Camus, Éditions de l'observatoire, 2020, ISBN 979-10-329-0901-0
- Les lents demains qui chantent, Éditions de l'observatoire, 2020, ISBN 979-10-329-1544-8
- La petite fabrique de l'inhumain, Éditions de l'observatoire, 2021, ISBN 979-10-329-0600-2
