= Michel Denisot =

French journalist (born 1945)

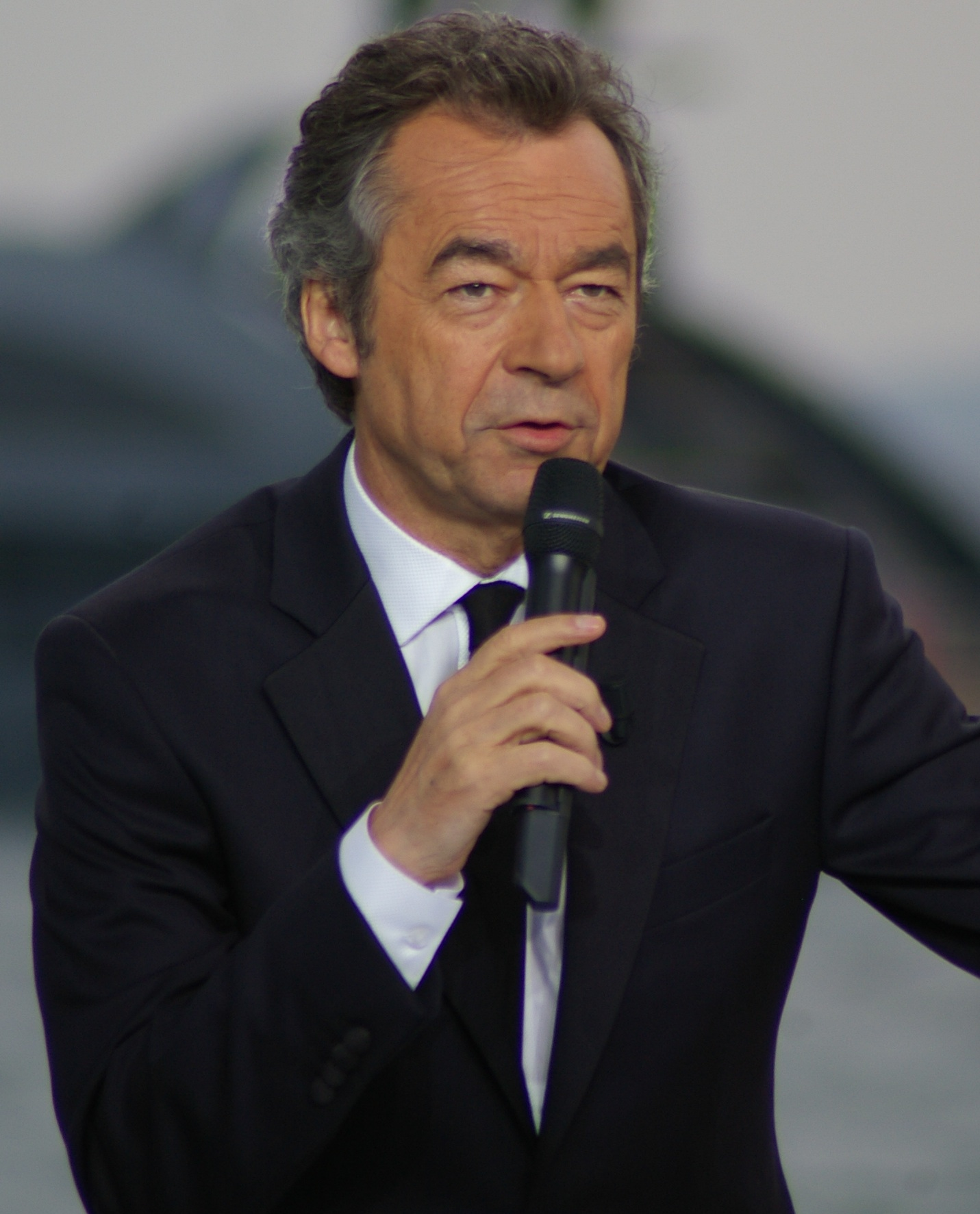
- Denisot in 2010
- Born: Michel Maurice Daniel Denisot; 16 April 1945 (age 81); Buzançais, Indre, France
- Occupations: Journalist, television producer, host, football executive
- Years active: 1968–present
- Children: 2

Michel Maurice Daniel Denisot (French pronunciation: [miʃɛl mɔʁis danjɛl dənizo]; born 16 April 1945) is a French journalist, producer, television host, and former football executive. He has served as the president of football clubs LB Châteauroux and Paris Saint-Germain.

== Early years ==
At 15 Denisot began his career of journalist as a correspondent in the local press in Châteauroux. From 1968, he worked on the regional station of the ORTF of Limoges. He worked for stations in Poitiers, Bordeaux and Reims.

From 1969, he worked on the gameshow Le Schmilblic, produced and presented by Guy Lux.

=== 1972–1984: journalist on TF1 ===
In 1972, he left Berry for Paris. He integrated the first of ORTF (before TF1). He fetched coffee or orange juice for Jean Lanzi and Jean-Pierre Elkabbach.

In 1973, he worked at the third of ORTF (before FR3 and France 3) before returning to TF1 in 1975 to co-host Journal télévisé de 13 heures with Yves Mourousi and Claude Pierrard for 2 and a half years.

In 1977, he integrated the sport division of TF1. From 1981 he hosted Téléfoot with Thierry Roland and was a football commentator.

== Football executive career ==
In 1988, Denisot became the president of football club LB Châteauroux, a position he would hold until 1991, when he became the president of Paris Saint-Germain (PSG). During his presidency, PSG won a Division 1 title, three Coupe de France titles, two Coupe de la Ligue titles, a Trophée des Champions, and a UEFA Cup Winners' Cup, the club's first European trophy. Denisot left the club in 1998. From 2004 to 2008, he was once again the president of Châteauroux.

In March 2021, Denisot returned to his role at Châteauroux following the club's sale to Abdullah Bin Mosaad Al Saud. He retired in April 2023.

== Awards ==
In November 1998, he became a Knight of the Legion of Honour, for his actions with football club Paris Saint-Germain.

== Filmography ==
- 2009: Incognito, directed by Éric Lavaine

== Honours ==
Orders

- Knight of the Legion of Honour: 1998
- Officer of the Legion of Honour: 2025

== See also ==
- Le Grand Journal
- Canal+
