= Oasis (drink) =

Non-carbonated fruit drinks product

- Logo as used in the British and Irish markets

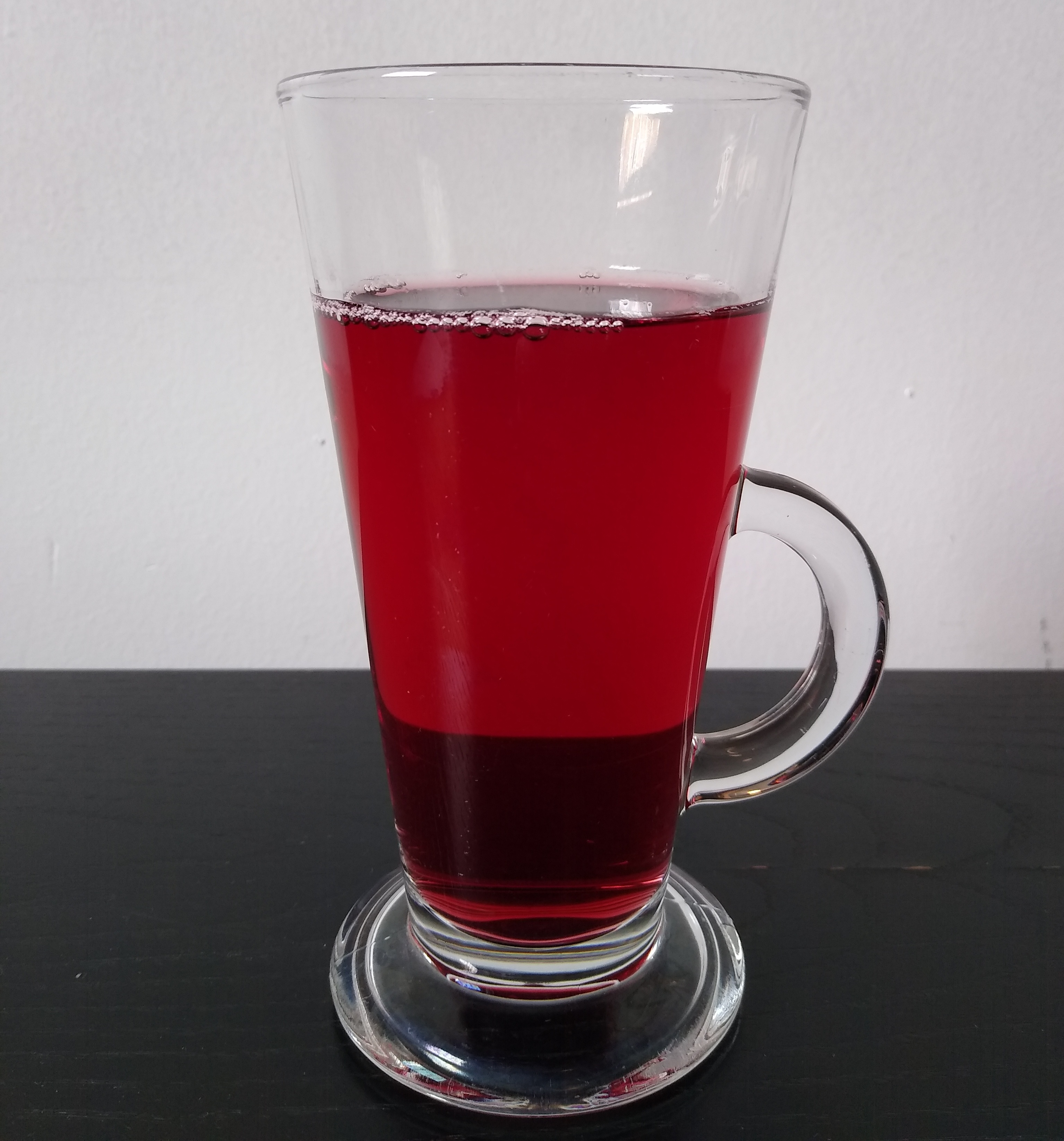
- Oasis Summer Fruits
- Type: Fruit drink
- Manufacturer: Suntory; The Coca-Cola Company (Great Britain and Ireland)
- Distributor: Suntory Beverage & Food; Coca-Cola Europacific Partners (Great Britain); Coca-Cola HBC Ireland and Northern Ireland (Ireland)
- Origin: France
- Introduced: 1966
- Website: Oasis on Coca-Cola GB website

Oasis is a non-carbonated bottled soft drink described as a "fruit juice drink – with sugar and sweeteners". It originated in France by Volvic in 1966. Oasis is owned and manufactured by Suntory, except in Britain and Ireland where it is the property of The Coca-Cola Company.

The drink came under the control of Perrier in 1984. In 1990, the Oasis brand and product came under the ownership of Cadbury Schweppes, making it a sister brand of Schweppes and in later years Orangina as well. In 1999, the British arm of the drinks business was sold to Coca-Cola and has run separately to this day. In 2005, Cadbury Schweppes sold the rest of the European business to a consortium, and it was then sold to Suntory in 2009.

== Flavours ==
Coca-Cola currently sell a number of different Oasis flavours, with availability differing between the British and Irish markets:

Flavour	Liquid colour	Availability	
Flavour	Liquid colour	GB	IE
Oasis Summer Fruits	Red	Yes	Yes
Oasis Citrus Punch	Yellow	Yes	Yes
Oasis Summer Fruits Zero	Red	Yes	No
Oasis Citrus Punch Zero	Yellow	Yes	No
Oasis Exotic Fruits Zero	Exotic yellow	Yes	No

In the past, Coca-Cola have also offered a number of different flavours including: Blackcurrant Apple, Mango Medley, Sour Apple Cherry and Sour Kiwi Apple. Also, the Oasis brand was also extended to other types of drinks with Oasis Mighty Drops, an "on the go" squash offered by Coca-Cola Great Britain from May 2014 with the flavours Mixed Berry, Mango and Raspberry Lemonade, and also the introduction of a new range of flavoured waters by Coca-Cola European Partners (CCEP) in 2018, called Oasis Aftershock and sold in Spicy Raspberry and Chilled Cherry flavours.

In France and Belgium, Suntory offer Oasis flavours including Tropical, Orange, Pomme-Cassis Framboise, Pêche Abricot, Multifruits, and various flavours of Ice Tea.

== Markets and popularity ==
Oasis was introduced to the British market in 1995.

As of 2018, it is the leading non-carbonated fruit drink in the French market. As of 2023, it is also the "number one juice drinks brand" in Britain.

In May 2013, Oasis was exported to stores and supermarkets around the Ivory Coast, and by the end of 2013, to stores and supermarkets around Madagascar.

== Advertising ==
=== Britain ===
Advertising campaigns for Oasis target adults and promote the drink as an alternative to water. The drink was promoted in 1996 in a TV advertising campaign in Britain with the well-known entertainer and actor Mike Reid, who at the time was at the height of his fame as Frank Butcher in EastEnders. One phrase has been "Open, pour. Be yourself once more." Its 2001 campaign had the tagline "Chill with the still". In summer 2006, Oasis used the tagline "Chug it".

In 2007, Oasis launched its first TV advertising campaign in six years with the tagline 'Chuggable Fruitiness'. Oasis' advertising campaign in 2008, "Run Cactus Kid Run" features a human-cactus hybrid known as Cactus Boy, as he goes on the run with his lover, a young girl from Kansas, Cactus Girl, who is pregnant with his strange cactus baby. These advertisements are loosely based on the film Badlands, using the same music. Following 32 complaints, the advert was banned by the Advertising Standards Authority, citing it could have been interpreted as promoting teenage pregnancy.

A follow-up campaign depicted Rubberduckzilla, a giant rubber duck who invades a Japanese city, destroying anything with water in its sight.

A new campaign in 2011 featured a bottle of Oasis and a Scotch egg. In 2018, the TV ad campaign consisted of "Togetherness Bottle". The "Be Your Own Oasis" campaign launched in 2023.

=== France ===
In 2012, Oasis launched its new slogan, "Be Fruit".

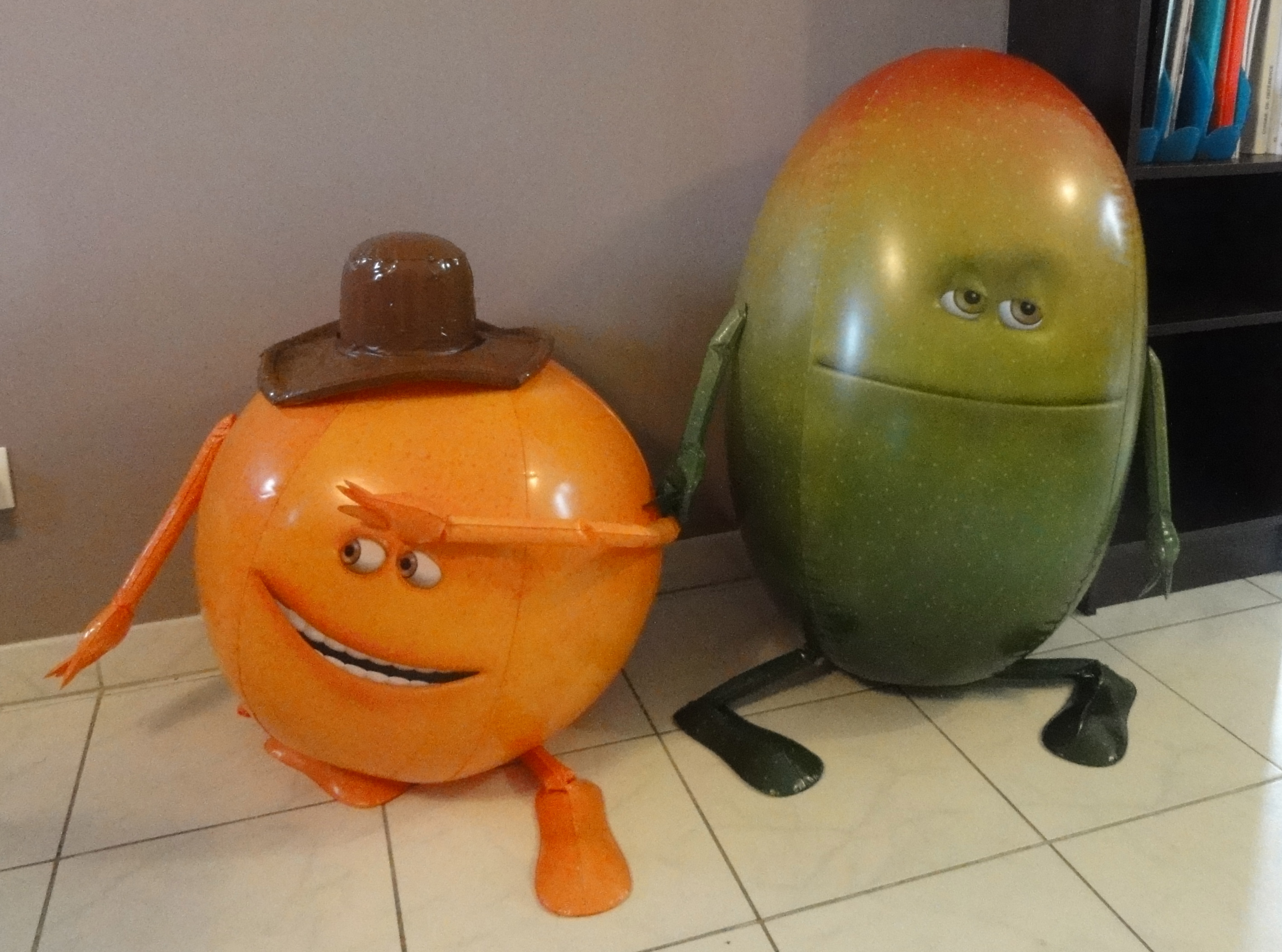
French mascots

These mascots are used in France:

- Alan anas: Voiced by Franck Dubosc
- Mangue Debol: Voiced by Elie Semoun (2004–2012) and Willy Rovelli (since 2012)
- Orange Preslé: Voiced by Titouan Lamazou (2004–2012) and Arsène Mosca (since 2012)
- Enrico Labricot: Voiced by Alain Gauthier (2004–2012) and Jeremy Michalak (since 2012)
- Eva Lapèche: Voiced by Noelle Perma (2004–2012) and Jenny Del Pino (since 2012)
