= ONDAR Show =

- Genre: Sketch comedy
- Created by: Catherine Barma; Laurent Ruquier
- Directed by: Serge Khalfon
- Country of origin: France
- Original language: French
- No. of seasons: 1
- No. of episodes: 13

Production
- Producer: Catherine Barma
- Production location: Moulin Rouge
- Running time: 52 minutes
- Production company: Tout sur l'écran

Original release
- Network: France 2
- Release: 6 October 2012 – 26 January 2013

Related
- On n'demande qu'à en rire

The ONDAR Show (French: [lə ɔ̃daʁ ʃo]) is a French sketch comedy television programme. It was broadcast on France 2 from October 2012 to January 2013, and featured comedians from On n'demande qu'à en rire performing sketches in a format based on American entertainment. It was cancelled after 13 episodes because of low viewing figures.
