= Val Kahl =

French journalist and television host

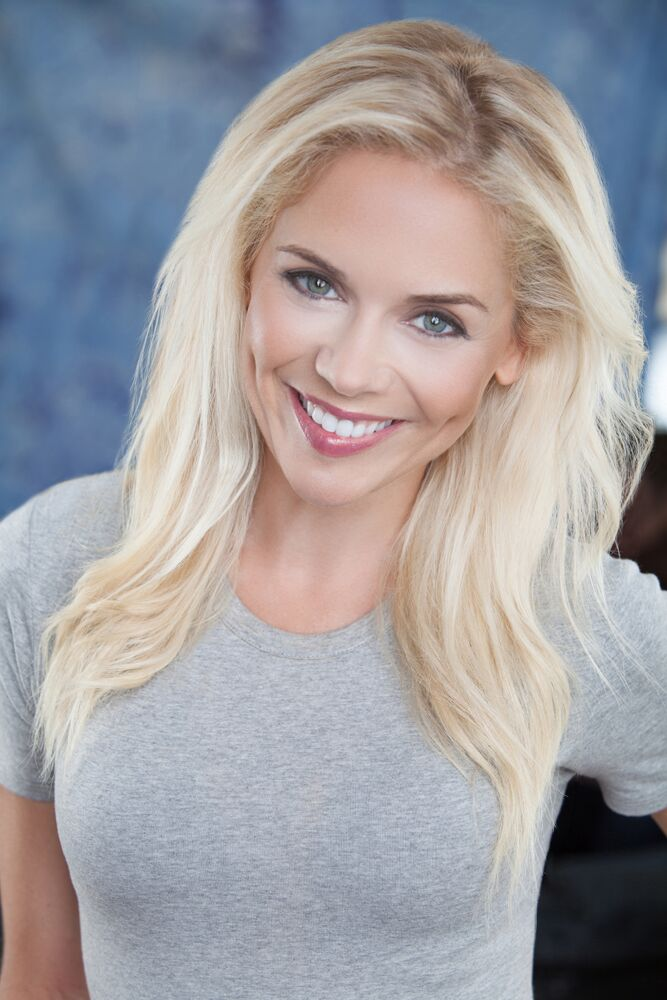
- Born: Valérie Kahl; Le Chesnay, France
- Occupations: Television host, radio host, presenter, journalist, producer
- Years active: 2000–present

Valérie Kahl is a French television host, radio host, journalist, and producer. She is known in France as the winner of the Reality Television competition show "Le Grand Casting de la Télé" on NRJ12 network in 2010, a Reality TV Show looking for their next television host.

Val Kahl has been hosting pop culture, awards ceremonies, lifestyle and Extreme Makeover shows on NRJ12 ("Paris C Fou", "Tellement Cannes", "Les Coulisses des NRJ Music Awards", "10 Jours pour Tout changer", "Mes amis les People", "Val by Night", and "Une famille au top"). She also hosted pop culture shows on MCM ("La Nuit de la Pub Drôle" and "Les 12 résolutions de l'année 2012") in France from 2009 to 2013.

In 2013, Val crossed over from Paris to Los Angeles and became the correspondent for Non Stop People and I24 News. She made an appearance as a Celebrity Expert on Extra (TV program). On set, she met Maria Menounos, who offered her to cohost on the show "Fashion411" on Black Hollywood Live and AfterBuzzTV, an online Entertainment network founded by her and partner Keven Undergaro where Val featured the latest trends in fashion and lifestyle between Paris and Hollywood.

Lifestyle and trends journalist, she hosts travel and food segments for the online channel "Visit the USA" by discovering the latest food trends in the U.S.

In 2014, she founded her production company French Fries Productions and is now a Los Angeles-based Entertainment television, radio correspondent, host and producer for the French and European Medias. Producer of numerous shows ("Les Sosies à Hollywood" on TF6, "Les Cht’is a Hollywood" on W9, "Les Anges de la téléréalité" et "Hollywood Girls" on NRJ12 as well as "Hélène et les animaux à Hollywood" on France 5). She produces Reality TV Shows, docu-series, media segments, and quickly became the go-to-girl and Hollywood Expert by interviewing A-Listers, and by covering Premieres and red carpets.

In 2017, she has been announced as the TV host and producer for a new car TV show on AB Moteurs, the number one European motor channel.

== Early life ==
Val Kahl was born in Le Chesnay, France. She grew up between Paris and the U.S. She started studying Political Science in a preparatory school in Paris but decided to volunteer in Nepal and South Asia for Mother Teresa's Missionaries of Charity. She attended EFAP Paris and earned a bachelor's degree in broadcasting and communication. She completed her master's degree at New York Institute of Technology, and New York University. After graduating in 2005, she began as an intern at CBS Evening News with Dan Rather.

== Television and radio career ==
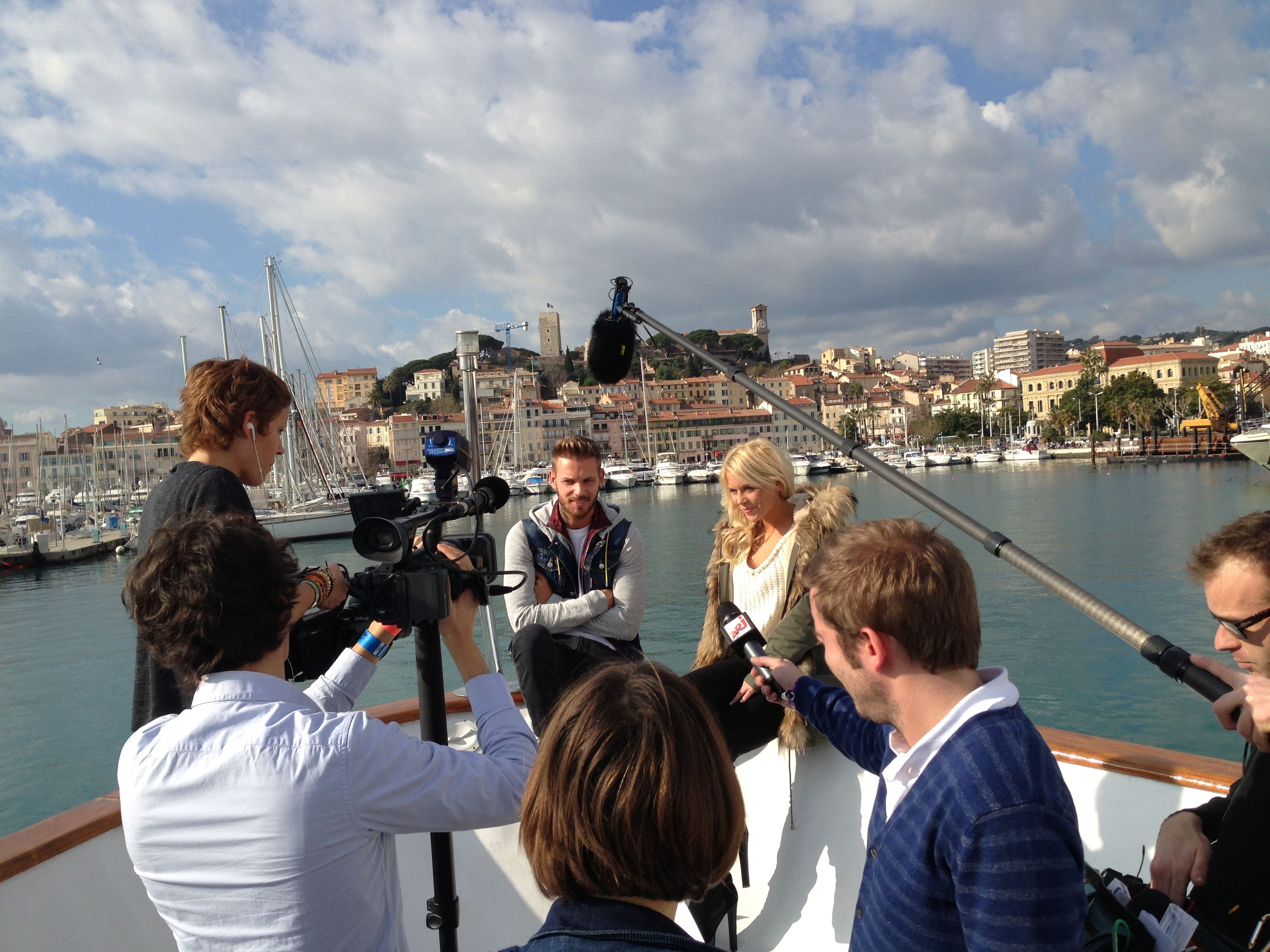
NRJ Music Awards in Cannes

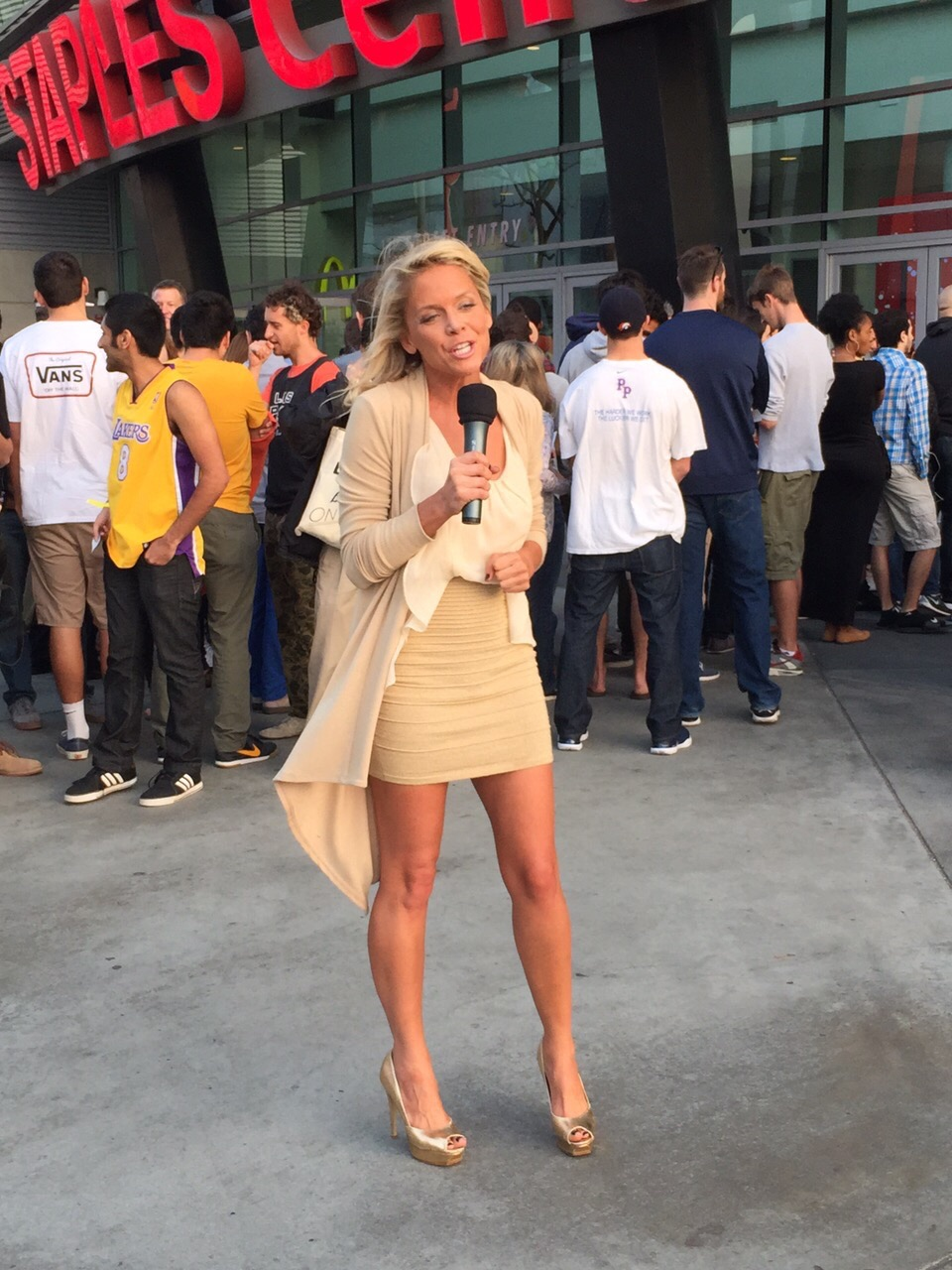
Val Kahl News reporting

In 2010, Val was a "Le Grand Casting de la Télé" Reality TV Show contestant, where she won among hundreds of thousands of candidates to become the next face of NRJ12 network.

In 2011, she hosted her own segment for "Paris C'est Fou" on NRJ Paris channel, reporting and trying out all the latest lifestyle trends with Culinary Chefs (Alain Ducasse, Jean-François Piège, Cyril Lignac, Guy Martin), Fashion Designers (Jean-Paul Gaultier, Karl Lagerfeld, Jean-Claude Jitrois, Elie Saab) and Fitness Personalities. She was also a Reality TV expert on Le Mag Les Anges de la téléréalité Talk Show, Season 1 and 2, hosted by Matthieu Delormeau. She then landed her own show "Val By Night", where she conducted one-on-one interviews with music, movie and fashion international A-Listers.

From 2011 to 2013, Val presented "Tellement Cannes" Show covering the Cannes Film Festival.

Val Kahl became the host of "Les coulisses des NRJ Music Awards" on NRJ12, an international Award ceremony presented by the French radio station NRJ to honor the best in the French and Worldwide music industry (2011 to 2013).

She interviewed music and movie international superstars as Sting, Mika, The Black Eyed Peas, PSY, Shakira, Jason Statham, Omar Sy, Stromae, Shy'm, Michaël Canitrot, Victoria Silvstedt, Usher, Zaz as well as top DJs Bob Sinclar and David Guetta.

She was a special correspondent for the MTV Music Awards in Belfast in 2012, and was the live voice commentator of the Grammys in 2013.

From 2012 to 2013, Val Kahl hosted "Une Famille Au Top", an Extreme Makeover show, coaching Belgian and French families in style, fitness and nutrition with her team of experts.

In 2013, she co-presented the Television Specials "La Nuit de la Pub Drôle" and "La Nuit de la Pub Sexy" on MCM, with television host Bruno Guillon. She also presented "Les 12 Résolutions de l'année 2012" on MCM Network, and made appearances as a co-host on two episodes of the Talk Show Touche pas à mon poste ! on France 4 channel. The same year, she hosted the Show "10 jours pour tout changer" on NRJ12.

She played herself in the reality TV show Les Sosies à Hollywood on the TF6 network in 2013.

In 2014, Val moved to Los Angeles and became the U.S. special correspondent for the Entertainment network Non Stop People and I24News reporting on movies, news, and Hollywood.

She became a celebrity expert on Extra (TV program) on a segment about Kim Kardashian and Kanye West's wedding in Europe. While on the set, she was discovered by Maria Menounos and was offered to be a host for the online show "Fashion411" on Black Hollywood Live and AfterBuzzTV(from 2014 to 2016). As a fashion and lifestyle expert, she hosted her segment "Le Chaud" ("Le hot") featuring trends between Paris and Hollywood. She interviewed Hollywood personalities such as Beverly Johnson.

In 2015, it was announced that she would produce and host "Le Daily Mag Hollywood" set in Los Angeles for the Talk Show "Le Daily Mag" airing in France on NRJ12 producing and hosting

In 2016, Val Kahl hosted a Hollywood news, movie and technology segment called "Good Morning USA" for the "Matin Week End" Talk Show on Bel RTL, the number one radio in Belgium.

As a food and travel expert, Val is now a host on the online travel channel "Visit the USA".

She is also the Hollywood correspondent on W9 channel for the French Talk Show OFNI, l'info retournée hosted by Bertrand Chameroy and the radio correspondent for the Talk Show "On refait le monde" hosted by Marc-Olivier Fogiel on RTL.

She was the correspondent covering the U.S. elections 2017 of President Donald Trump on the Entertainment TV Show "Indiscrétions" on NRJ12 hosted by Frédéric Joly.

In 2017, Val Kahl has been announced as the host and producer of a new car TV show, in English and French language, on AB Moteurs, the number one European motor channel.

Date	Show	Network	Role
2010	Le Grand Casting de la Télé	NRJ12	Winner of the Reality Show
2010	Paris C Fou	NRJ Paris	Reporter
2011	Tellement Cannes	NRJ12	Host
2011	Les Coulisses des NRJ Music Awards	NRJ12	Host
2012	Une Famille Au Top	NRJ12	Host
2012	Tellement Cannes	NRJ12	Host
2012	Les Coulisses des NRJ Music Awards	NRJ12	Host
2012	La Nuit de la Pub Drôle	MCM	Co-Host
2012	10 Jours pour Tout changer	NRJ12	Presenter
2012	Les 12 résolutions de l'année 2012	MCM	Presenter
2012	Val By Night	NRJ12	Host
2012	Le Mag Les Anges de la téléréalité	NRJ12	U.S Reality TV expert
2012	Touche pas à mon poste !	France 4	Co-Host
2013	Les Coulisses des NRJ Music Awards	NRJ12	Host
2013	Le Mag Les Anges de la téléréalité	NRJ12	U.S Reality TV expert
2013	Val By Night	NRJ12	Host
2013	Les Sosies à Hollywood	TF6	Herself
2014	24 People	NonStopPeople	Correspondent, producer
2014	Extra	Extra	Celebrity expert
2014	Fashion411	Black Hollywood Live	Co-Host
2014	Les Cht’is a Hollywood	W9	Producer
2014	Hollywood Girls	NRJ12	Producer
2015	I24News	I24News	Correspondent, producer
2015	Hélène et les animaux	France 5	Producer
2015	Le Mag Hollywood	NRJ12	Host, producer
2016	Good Morning USA	Bel RTL	Host
2016	OFNI	W9	Correspondent, producer
2016	Indiscrétions	NRJ12	Reporter, producer
2017	Crazy America	AB Moteurs	Host and producer
2017	My Zen Trendy	My Zen TV	Host, producer, writer
2018	My Zen Trendy	My Zen TV	Host, producer, writer

== Productions ==
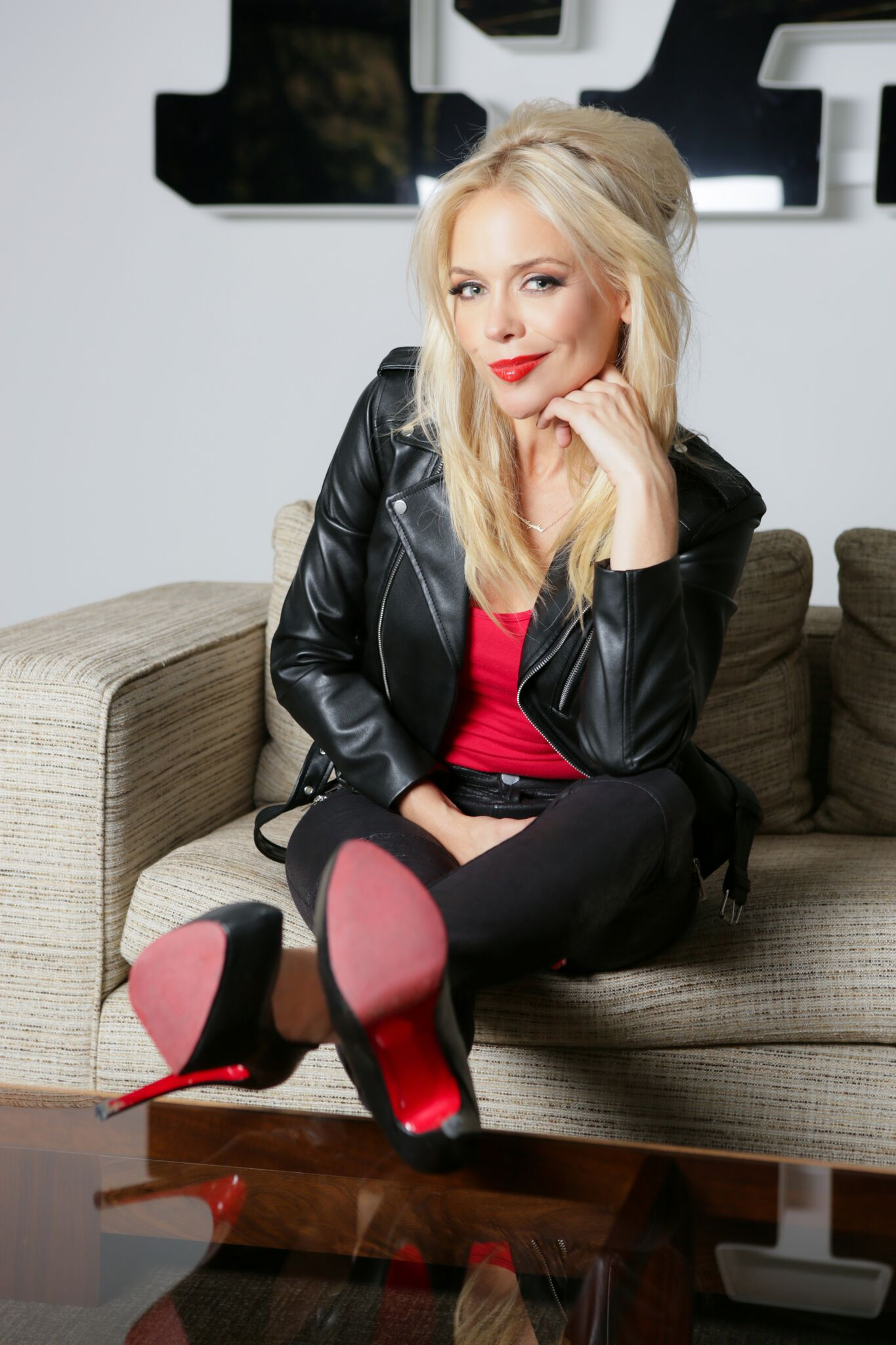

Val Kahl is a producer for numerous French TV shows in Hollywood such as "Les Sosies a Hollywood" on TF6 (2013), "Les Cht’is a Hollywood" on W9, Les Anges de la téléréalité and Hollywood Girls on NRJ12 (2014), and "Hélène et les animaux" in Hollywood on France 5 (2015).

In 2015, Val Kahl wrote, produced and acted in a parody spoofing the interview gone wrong between the French TV host Énora Malagré and Pharrell Williams on Virgin Radio.

Val founded FrenchFries Productions, a Los Angeles-based production company that produces Reality TV Shows and documentaries for European networks, as well as video content for lifestyle brands. She is often featured as a brand ambassador.

== Publishing ==
From 2013 to 2014, she is the editorial associate for the magazines Fan 2 and Series reporting on Hollywood series and movies.

Since 2015, Val is the US Chief Editor for Welcome Magazine, a French and English luxury print and online magazine, and features her own column as the go-to girl and trend expert between Hollywood and Paris.

== Master of ceremonies ==
In 2012, Val hosted the Danone Nations Cup in Japan, an international soccer-cup event.

In 2014, she hosted the charity fundraiser "Kay Angel" in Malibu, California, benefiting the children of Haiti.

In 2015, she presented the talent show Côte-d’Or Festival Song in Dijon, France with French-Italian singer and personality Mario Barravecchia.
