= Flashback (2021 film) =

2021 film by Caroline Vigneaux

- Release poster
- Directed by: Caroline Vigneaux
- Written by: Caroline Vigneaux
- Produced by: Alain Goldman
- Starring: Caroline Vigneaux; Sophia Aram; Suzanne Clément; Lison Daniel; Gad Elmaleh; Lannick Gautry; Emy Letertre; Florent Peyre; Sylvie Testud
- Cinematography: Vincent Mathias
- Edited by: Frédérique Olszak
- Music by: Maxime Desprez; Michaël Tordjman
- Production company: Légende Films
- Distributed by: Amazon Studios
- Release date: 11 November 2021
- Running time: 94 minutes
- Country: France
- Language: French

Flashback is a 2021 French fantasy comedy film written and directed by Caroline Vigneaux. It stars Vigneaux, Sophia Aram, Suzanne Clément, Lison Daniel, Gad Elmaleh, Lannick Gautry, Emy Letertre, Florent Peyre and Sylvie Testud. A cynical lawyer is forced to relive the past and learn lessons from history. The film was released on Amazon Prime Video on 11 November 2021.

== Plot ==
Charlie Leroy is a self-centered, career-driven lawyer who succeeds in getting her client, an accused rapist, acquitted on the grounds that his accuser was wearing thong underwear at the time, which Charlie argues indicates that the sex was consensual. Charlie does this cynically, as she herself is wearing thong underwear that day. After celebrating her court victory, Charlie is given a ride by a magical taxi driver, Hubert, who causes her to travel through time to different moments in French history, as well as events in Charlie's own life and the life of her parents, so that she learns about the previous struggles of women to gain equality, and also gains a better understanding of her own mother's life and struggles.

Events in which Charlie participates include:

- The trial of Joan of Arc in 1431, where Charlie, who is suspected of being in league with the devil due to her red underwear, is subjected to trial by water
- Her parents getting their first bank account (which will be controlled by her father) in 1964
- A brief encounter with a violent caveman in prehistoric times
- A romantic evening of conversation with George Sand in 1850
- A political meeting with Olympe de Gouges and Nicolas de Condorcet relating to the Declaration of the Rights of Women, in 1793
- Seeing her father acting abusively to a young Charlie and her mother, on the first observation of International Women's Day in France, in 1982
- Accidentally running over Pierre Curie on a wagon, then convincing Aristide Briand (who is then Minister of Education) to appoint Pierre's widow Marie Curie to the professorship he held, in 1906
- Meeting (and seducing) Napoleon Bonaparte as he is drafting language defining the roles of husband and wife that is subsequently included in the Napoleonic Code of 1804, in 1803
- Meeting her grandparents at a polling place during the first French elections allowing women to vote in 1945
- Witnessing the trial of Marie-Claire Chevalier in 1972, along with Simone de Beauvoir

Charlie is eventually brought back to the morning of the trial, where she relives the day differently. Charlie surprises everyone by representing the rape victim instead of the accused, and the trial ends in a finding of guilt.

== Cast ==
- Caroline Vigneaux as Charlie Leroy
- Issa Doumbia as Hubert Dialo
- Sophia Aram as Gisèle Halimi
- Suzanne Clément as George Sand
- Lison Daniel as Marie Curie
- Emy Letertre as Joan of Arc
- Lannick Gautry as Marquis de Condorcet
- Florent Peyre as Napoleon Bonaparte
- Sylvie Testud as Olympe de Gouges
- Gad Elmaleh as Maximilien Robespierre
- Bruno Solo as Aristide Briand
- Gabriel Dermidjian as Abbé Cauchon
- Guillaume de Tonquédec as The cop

== Production ==
In March 2021, it was announced Caroline Vigneaux, Sophia Aram, Suzanne Clément, Lison Daniel, Gad Elmaleh, Lannick Gautry, Emy Letertre, Florent Peyre and Sylvie Testud had joined the cast of the film, with Vigneaux directing from a screenplay she wrote, with Alain Goldman serving as a producer under his Légende Films banner, with Amazon Studios set to distribute. The film overtly references the 1993 time loop film Groundhog Day, Charlie's radio alarm clock announces, "It is not Groundhog Day, it is National Women's day."

Principal photography on the film began in February 2021.

== Music ==
The following musical selections were used during the movie and listed in the closing credits.

- "Bitch" by Plastiscines
- "We Can Hide Out" by Ofenbach & Portugal. The Man
- "Girls Just Wanna Have Some" by Chromatics
- "You Want My Money" by Lilly Wood and the Prick
- "Evolution" by Aedan
- "Le temps" by Aedan
- "Beijos" by DJ Vadim feat. Heidi Vogel
- "Enola Gay" by Orchestral Manoeuvres in the Dark
- "Les filles de Camaret" (traditional)
- "J'ai vu le loup, le renard et la belette" (traditional)
- "Etude Op. 10, No. 3 (Tristesse)" by Frédéric Chopin
- "Lemon Incest" by Serge Gainsbourg and Charlotte Gainsbourg, with music based on Chopin's Étude Op. 10, No. 3
- "La Traviata" by Carine Chassol
- "T'as le Look, Coco" by Laroche Valmont
- "Debout les femmes" by 39 Femmes
- "Cheeky Vintage" by John Rowcroft
- "Flashback" by Aedan, Voix Fanny Koom & Fanny Nkake
- "Rimes féminines" by Juliette

== Reception ==
Yves Jaeglé of Le Parisien rated the film 3.5 out of 5, calling it "Feminism For Dummies" and a "slap in the face to sexism".
