= On n'demande qu'à en rire =

French television show

- Genre: Sketch comedy; Talent show
- Created by: Laurent Ruquier
- Presented by: Laurent Ruquier; Jérémy Michalak; Bruno Guillon
- Starring: See below
- Judges: See below
- Theme music composer: David Drussant; Joana Balavoine
- Opening theme: "Na-Na-Na-Na"
- Country of origin: France
- Original language: French
- No. of seasons: 4
- No. of episodes: 628 + 6 prime-time specials

Production
- Producers: Catherine Barma; Laurent Ruquier
- Production location: Moulin Rouge
- Running time: 52 minutes (Note: From 1 April to 28 June 2013, episodes lasted only 45 minutes.)
- Production company: Tout sur l'écran

Original release
- Network: France 2
- Release: 6 September 2010 – 4 July 2014

Related
- ONDAR Show; Last Comic Standing

On n'demande qu'à en rire (literally "We ask only to laugh at it"; often abbreviated as ONDAR [ɔ̃daʁ]) is a French comedy television programme. First broadcast on France 2 in 2010, it was created by Laurent Ruquier and involved aspiring comedians performing sketches they had written. The jury then scored the sketches; comedians receiving a high enough score could return for future episodes.

The programme was filmed at the Moulin Rouge and broadcast from Monday to Friday at around 6 p.m. on France 2 from 6 September 2010. During the second season, it was also broadcast on Saturdays. Special programmes were also broadcast during prime time (three in the second season and three in the third season).

During the first two seasons, daily shows, prime-time specials and the gala at the Casino de Paris featuring the show's best comedians were all presented by Laurent Ruquier. For the third, Ruquier was replaced for the daily shows by Jérémy Michalak. The show ended on 28 June 2013 because of low viewing figures. "Best-of" compilations were shown on France 2 until new episodes presented by Bruno Guillon began on 7 April 2014. After viewing figures remained low, the show ended again on 4 July 2014.

== Format ==
Little-known comedians, alone or in groups, professionals or amateurs, may appear in a sketch on the show. Each candidate is evaluated by a panel of judges, known as the jury, and by the audience. Candidates who obtain a sufficient score may come back with a new sketch. Each sketch is written by the candidate (with or without other writers) about a theme relating to current events chosen several days before the recording from a list. Comedians who have performed more than 10 times (known as pensionnaires, "residents") do not get to choose from the list; their theme is imposed by Laurent Ruquier.

=== Preselection ===
A group of comedians for the show is selected after sending in a text or video application. Others are contacted directly by the show's artistic director Charles Hudon and his colleague Émilie Dieudonné at humour festivals. Some are hesitant to participate because they are scared of the jury, as was the case with mainstay Arnaud Tsamere.

=== Shows ===
Daily shows contain four sketches, except from 1 April 2013 to 28 June 2013 when, because of changes in France 2's schedule, they only contained three. During each sketch, the four members of the jury may press at any time a "stop" button, called a buzzer. If two judges do this, the sketch is interrupted and the comedian is not scored. If the end of the sketch is reached, the comedian is scored: every member of the jury gives a score between 0 and 20. These are added to the average score given by the studio audience. The comedian must obtain a total of 60/100 (an average of 12/20) to be able to return several days later. In season 4, the show's final sketch was performed by a "historic" pensionnaire who is not scored.

If a comedian does not get the required 60 points, they can be saved. This happened differently depending on the season.

== Seasons ==
=== Season 1 (2010–2011) ===
The first season, presented by Laurent Ruquier, saw the show's rules progressively put in place. The jury was then composed of three members, as well as Laurent Ruquier who also scored the candidates.

During the summer holidays between the first and second seasons, a weekly version of the show called On n'demande qu'à en rire : « Spécial vacances » (Holiday Special), in which only pensionnaires participated.

At the end of season 1, Arnaud Tsamere was named "best comedian of the season" by television viewers. During this season, he got over 90/100 points 11 times, notably with his sketch L'avocat de la salade, la frite et la saucisse ("The lawyer of the salad, the chip and the sausage", based on puns involving crime and food) which got him 99/100 points.

=== Season 2 (2011–2012) ===
The second season, still presented by Laurent Ruquier, began on 5 September 2011. It saw the first live prime-time show on France 2 on 4 February 2012, with Fabrice on the jury. These prime-time shows had very different rules. They allowed 10 comedians to be selected to take part in a gala in June 2012 at the Casino de Paris.

At the end of the prime-time show on 29 June 2012, Jérémy Ferrari was named "best comedian of the season" by television viewers and the jury. During season 2, he passed 90 points eight times, notably with his sketch L'adoption pour les nuls ("Adoption For Dummies") featuring Guillaume Bats, thanks to which he obtained the maximum score of 100 points. During this season, two other sketches reached 100 points: group sketches, one led by the Lascars Gays and the other by Jérémy Ferrari.

The five final programmes of the season were broadcast from 23 to 27 July 2012, between the 2012 Tour de France and the 2012 Summer Olympics. Afterwards, best-of shows featuring the best sketches from seasons 1 and 2 were broadcast from Monday to Saturday, until the third season began.

=== Season 3 (2012–2013) ===
Laurent Ruquier, no longer able to present the show because of his busy schedule, was replaced by Jérémy Michalak. Unlike his predecessor, Jérémy did not score the comedians and acted only as presenter; the jury was composed of four members. Nonetheless, Ruquier sometimes appeared on the jury, and continued to present prime-time specials.

The third season saw numerous pensionnaires leave to take part in a weekly spin-off programme called the ONDAR Show, broadcast every Saturday from 6 October 2012. The ONDAR Show was cancelled on 26 January 2013 due to low viewing figures. After its cancellation, certain comedians have come back periodically to perform new sketches.

As in the previous season, two prime-time specials allowed 10 comedians to participate in a gala at the Casino de Paris. At the end of the season's third prime-time special, Donel Jack'sman was named "best comedian of the season" by television viewers and the jury. In season 3, he passed 90 points 9 times. After the season ended, best-of shows were shown on weekdays at 6pm during the summer.

On 28 March 2013, during a special programme broadcast at 6 pm, four jury members (Jean-Luc Moreau, Jean Benguigui, Laurent Ruquier and Jean-Marie Bigard) each performed a sketch and were scored by four candidates from the show (Nicole Ferroni, Arnaud Tsamere, Florent Peyre and Jérémy Ferrari). Season 3's audiences fell from the previous seasons'.

=== Season 4 (2014) ===
With audiences judged insufficient by France 2 (8% of viewers at the end of season 3 compared to the 14% expected by the channel), the show initially did not return for a fourth season and was replaced by Jusqu'ici tout va bien and then by L'Émission pour tous after the former was cancelled. Four On n'demande qu'à en rire specials broadcast in prime time and presented by Laurent Ruquier were initially planned, but did not take place.

Since the channel could not find a programme to get its late afternoon audiences back up (Jusqu'ici tout va bien and L'Émission pour tous got 4 and 6% respectively), France 2 finally decided to launch a new form of the show from 7 April 2014 with a new presenter, Bruno Guillon, who, like Jérémy Michalak, did not score the candidates. Faced with criticism reproaching the legitimacy of jury members, new jurors were introduced.

Certain rules changed in this season: the final sketch in each episode, performed by a "historic" pensionnaire, was not scored. Furthermore, one of these can hold the role of parrain (patron, literally "godfather") for a week, and can save candidates from elimination. Audiences for this season remained very low, despite good progress before the end of May, and the programme ended on 4 July 2014.

== Presenters and jury ==
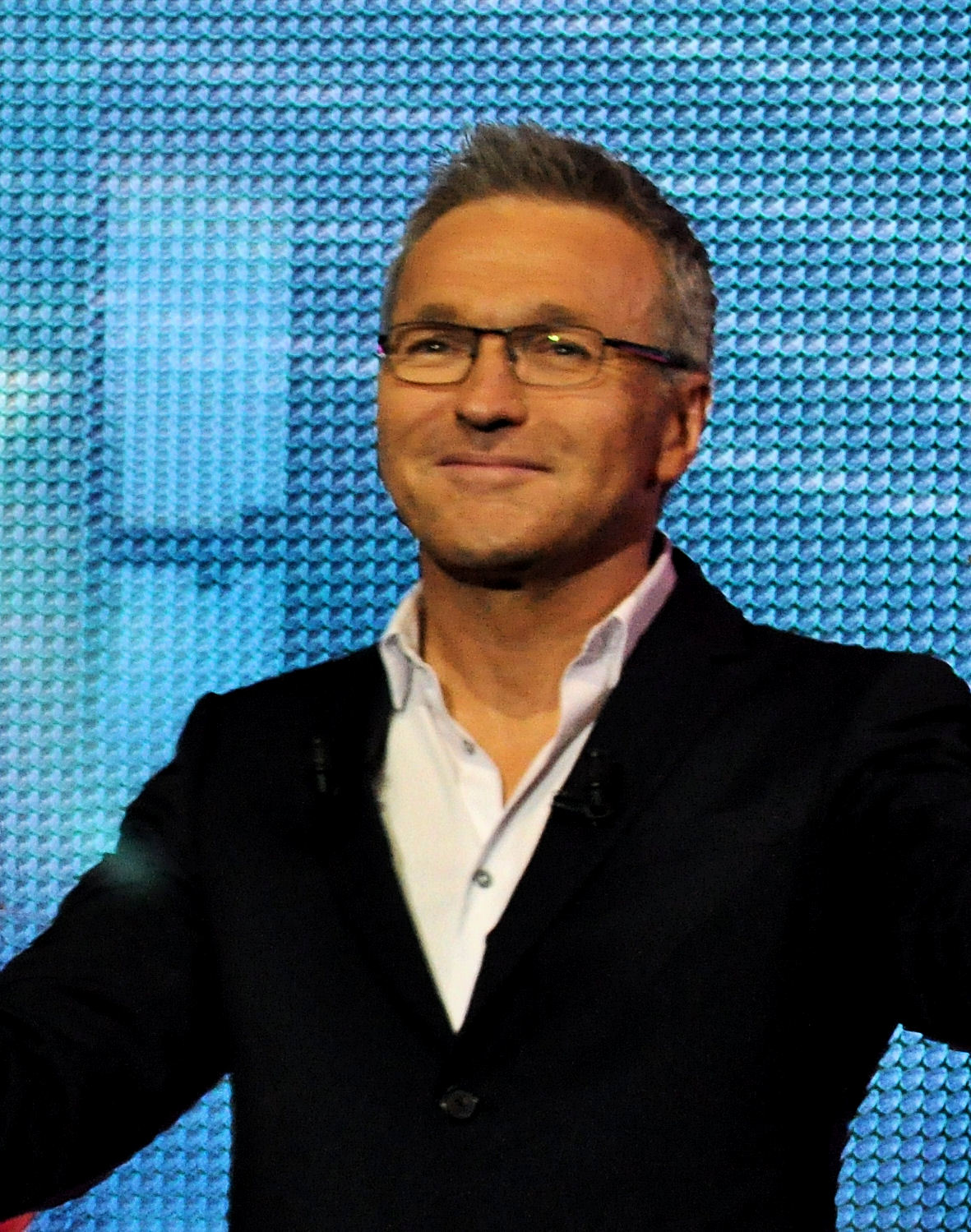
Laurent Ruquier presented the first two seasons, as well as creating and co-producing the show.

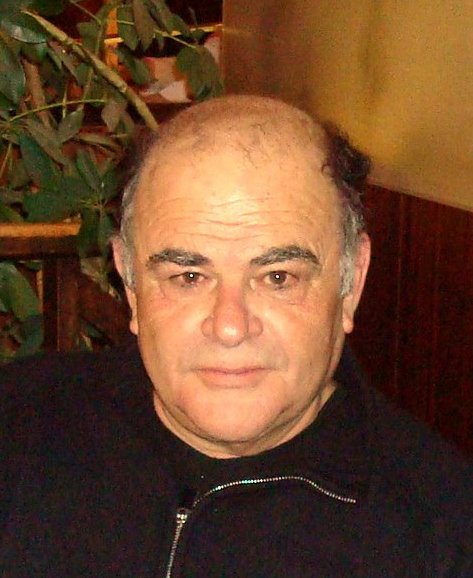
Jean Benguigui

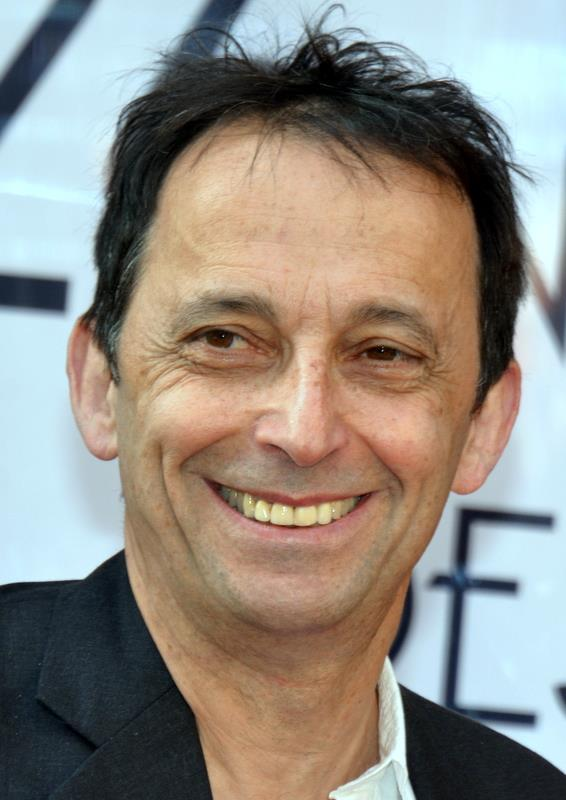
Eric Métayer

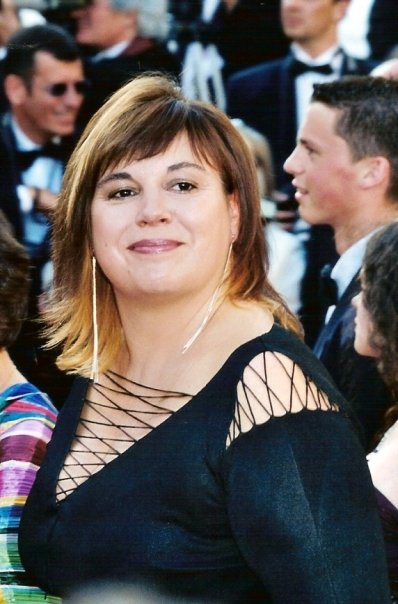
Michèle Bernier

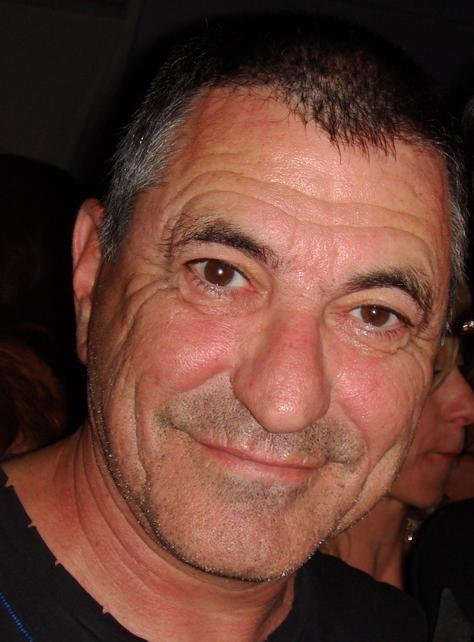
Jean-Marie Bigard

Jean Benguigui and Eric Métayer both appeared in the first three seasons as jurors. Michèle Bernier and Jean-Marie Bigard appeared less frequently.

The first two seasons were presented by Laurent Ruquier. The jury was originally composed of Ruquier, two culturally relevant guests and a member of Ruquier's comedy troupe, the Bande à Ruquier; the last three changed every day. Very quickly (from 18 October 2010), Ruquier replaced this temporary jury with a recurring jury composed of himself and three alternating people from the list below. When Jérémy Michalak took over as presenter in September 2012, he did not score comedians, and a fourth juror was added to keep a total score of 100. Laurent Ruquier occasionally returns to the show as a juror. This was also the case during season 4, presented by Bruno Guillon.

Presenters	Season 1	Season 2	Season 3	Season 4
Laurent Ruquier	Daily	Daily	(Note: Ruquier presented the three prime-time shows in this season, while Jérémy Michalak was in the jury.)	
Jérémy Michalak			Daily	
Bruno Guillon				Daily
Jury	Season 1	Season 2	Season 3	Season 4
Laurent Thibault				Daily
Stéphanie Bataille				Daily
Marie-Pascale Osterrieth				Regularly
Grégoire Furrer				Daily
Catherine Barma	Regularly	Regularly	Regularly	Occasionally
Laurent Ruquier	Daily	Daily	Occasionally	
Jean Benguigui	Daily	Daily	Regularly	
Michèle Bernier	Rarely		Regularly	
Jean-Marie Bigard			Occasionally	
Danièle Évenou			Rarely	
Éric Métayer	Regularly	Regularly	Occasionally	
Jean-Luc Moreau	Occasionally	Occasionally	Occasionally	
Isabelle Mergault	Rarely	Occasionally	Rarely	
Anne-Sophie Aparis		Rarely	Occasionally	
Alain Sachs			Rarely	
Fabrice		Rarely		
Patrice Leconte	Occasionally	Rarely		
Virginie Lemoine	Occasionally			
Philippe Gildas	Occasionally			

Legend:
Daily (10/10 programmes)
Regularly (at least 4/10 programmes)
Occasionally (at least 2/10 programmes)
Rarely (less than 2/10 programmes)
Did not participate in this season

== Candidates ==
Hundreds of comedians have appeared on the show. Those who have performed over five times are called habitués (regulars), and those who have reached 10 performances are called pensionnaires (residents). With 78 performances (not counting specials and sketches which were not scored), Arnaud Tsamere holds the record for the most performances across all seasons. Certain comedians decide to leave the programme, like Kev Adams, who left during season 1 to concentrate on filming the TV series Soda. Other candidates, like Mr Fraize and Constance left because they thought they had done all they could. Numerous comedians from the first two seasons left the show to participate in the ONDAR Show, and some did not return after it was cancelled.

The programme has allowed those who have performed the most to become well-known and increased audiences for their theatre shows. They have also achieved media success and are invited onto numerous television shows (including Fort Boyard and Le plus grand cabaret du monde). Some have become actors, like Kev Adams, and some presenters, like Jérémy Ferrari and Florent Peyre in Touche pas à mon poste !, Olivier de Benoist in Vivement dimance, Nicole Ferroni on France Inter, and Arnaud Tsamere in Canapé Quiz (an adaptation of Hollywood Game Night) on TMC.

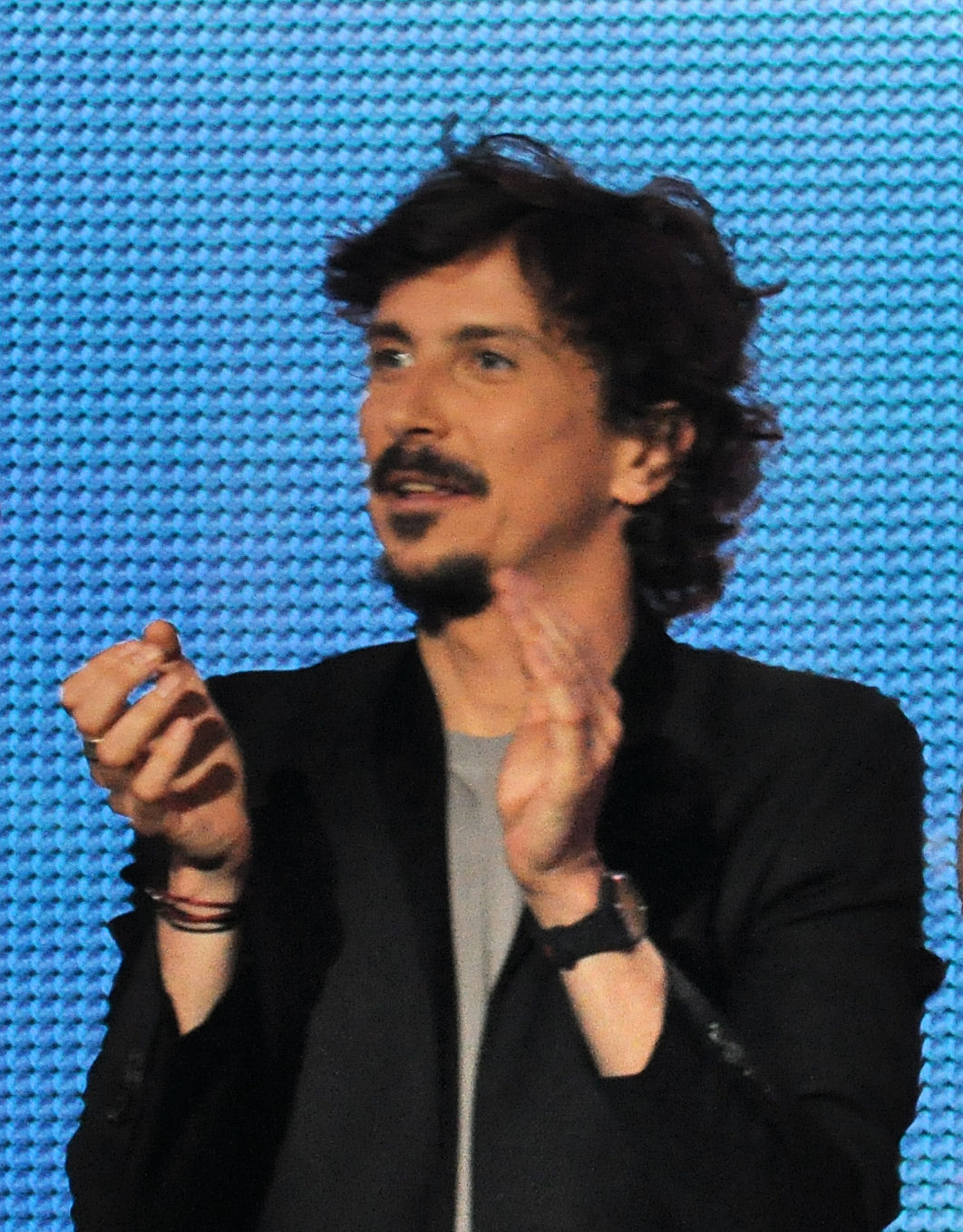
Arnaud Tsamere

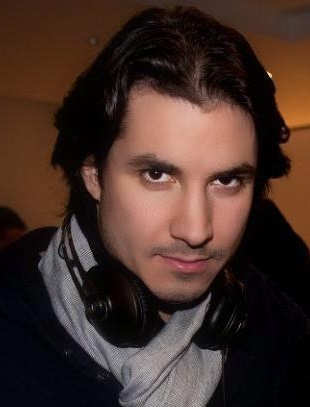
Jérémy Ferrari

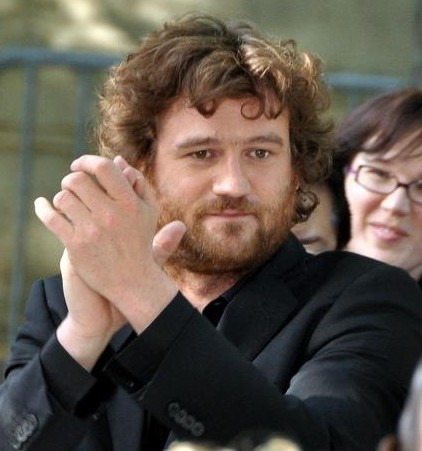
Olivier de Benoist

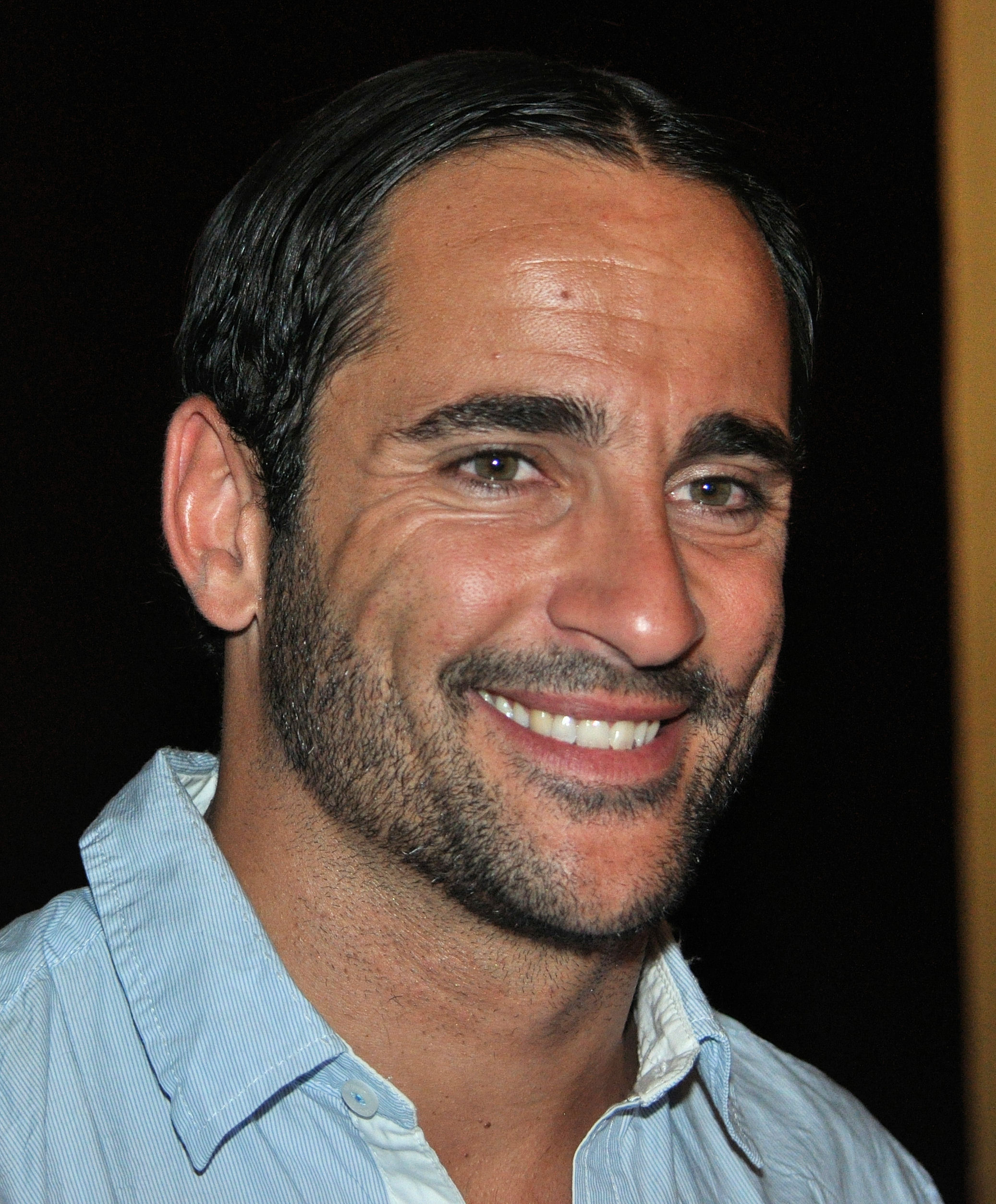
Florent Peyre

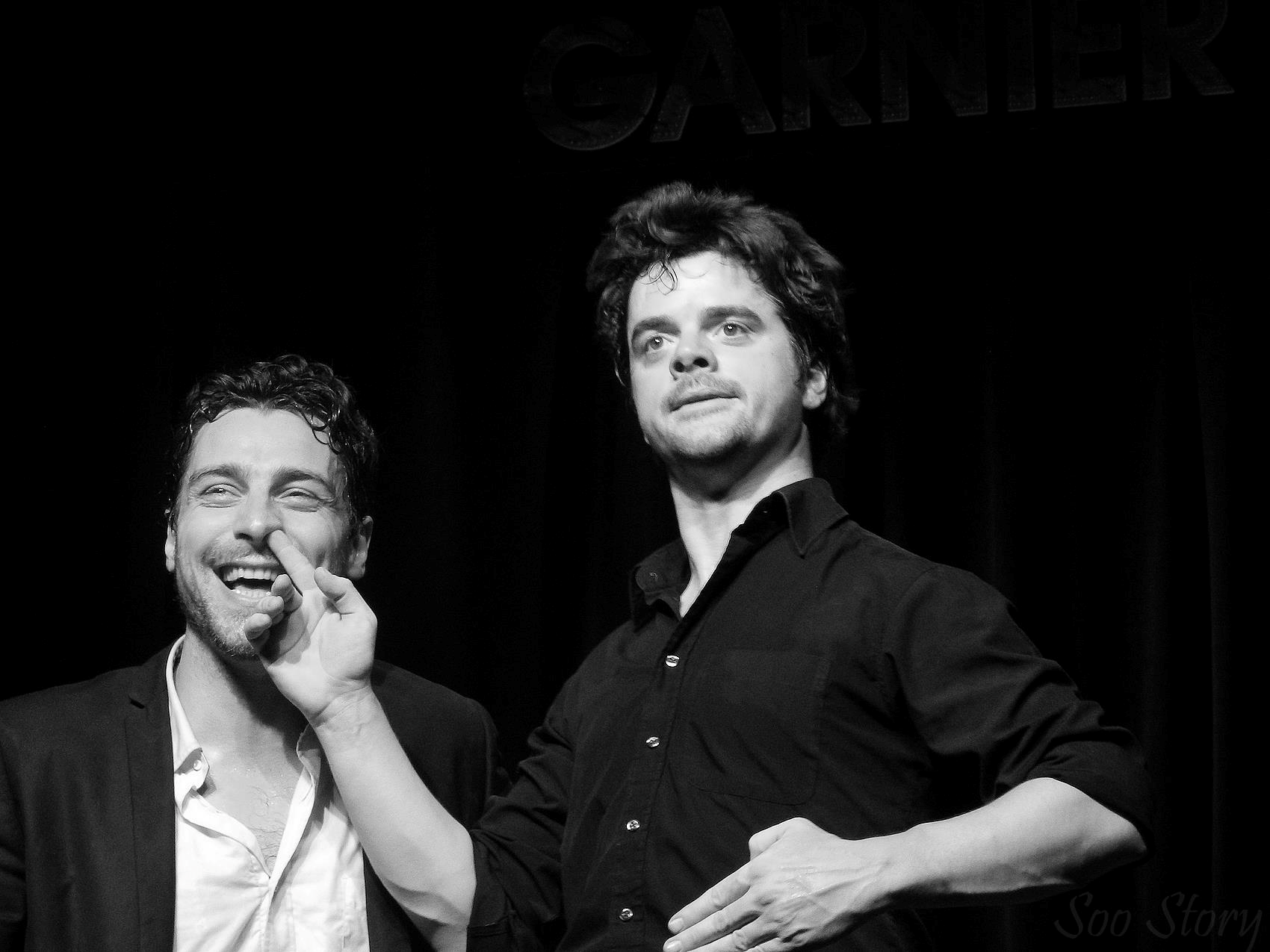
Garnier et Sentou

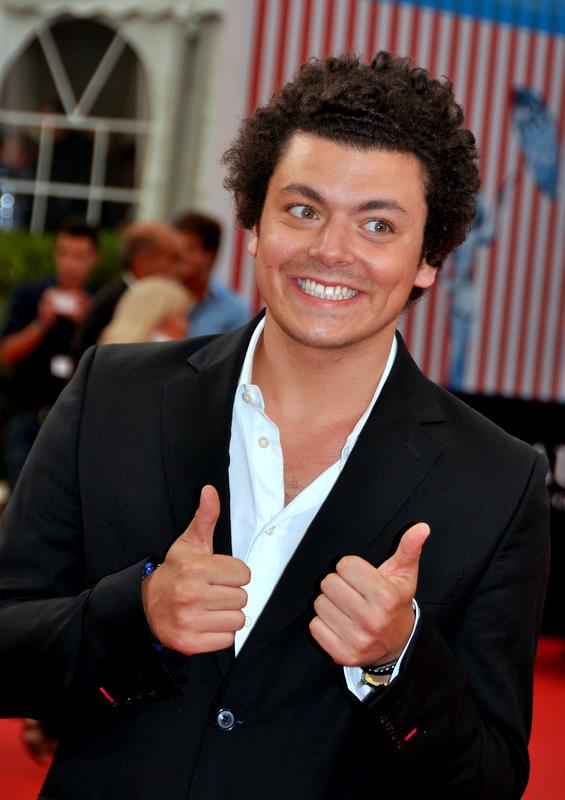
Kev Adams

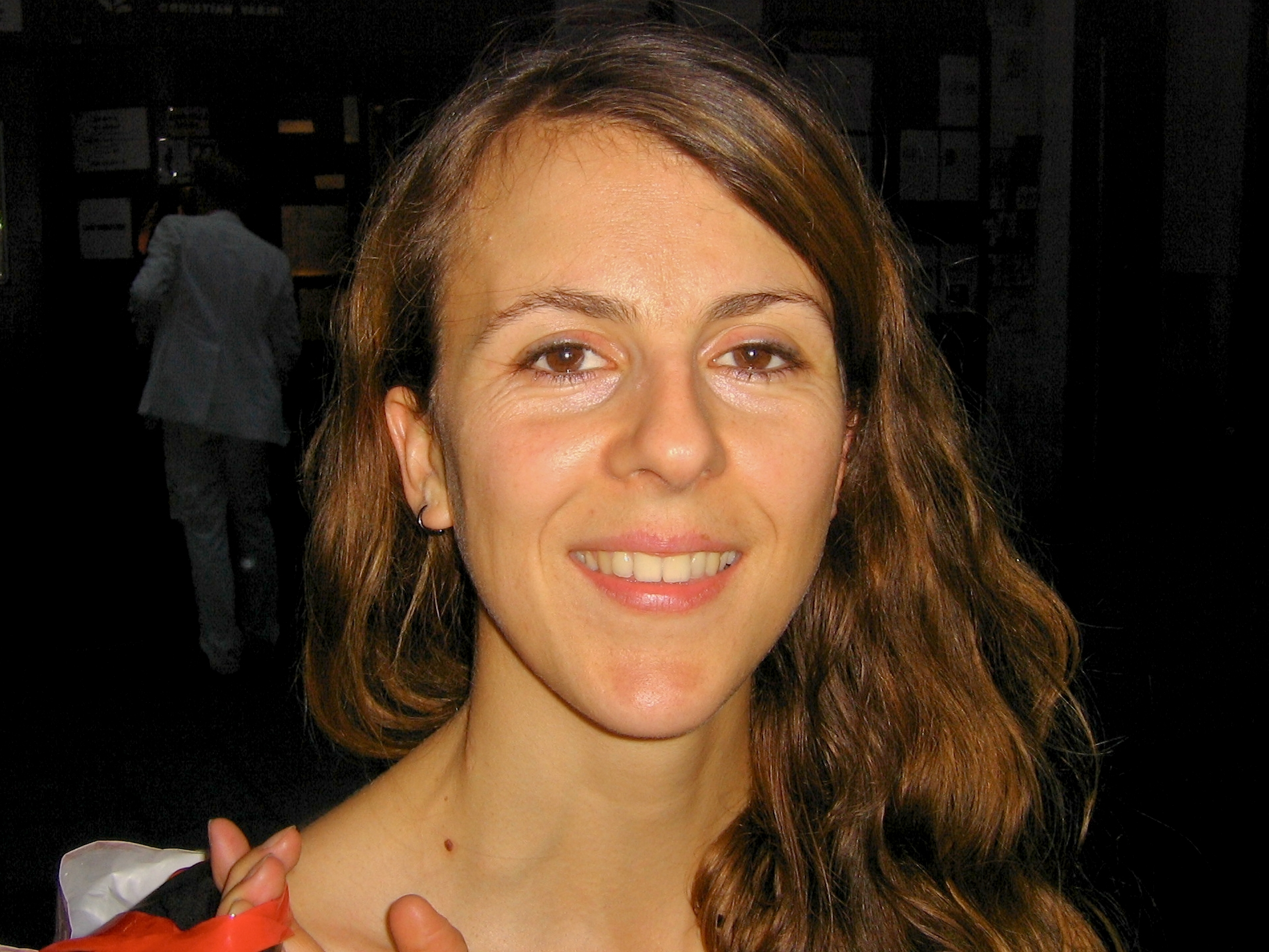
Nicole Ferroni

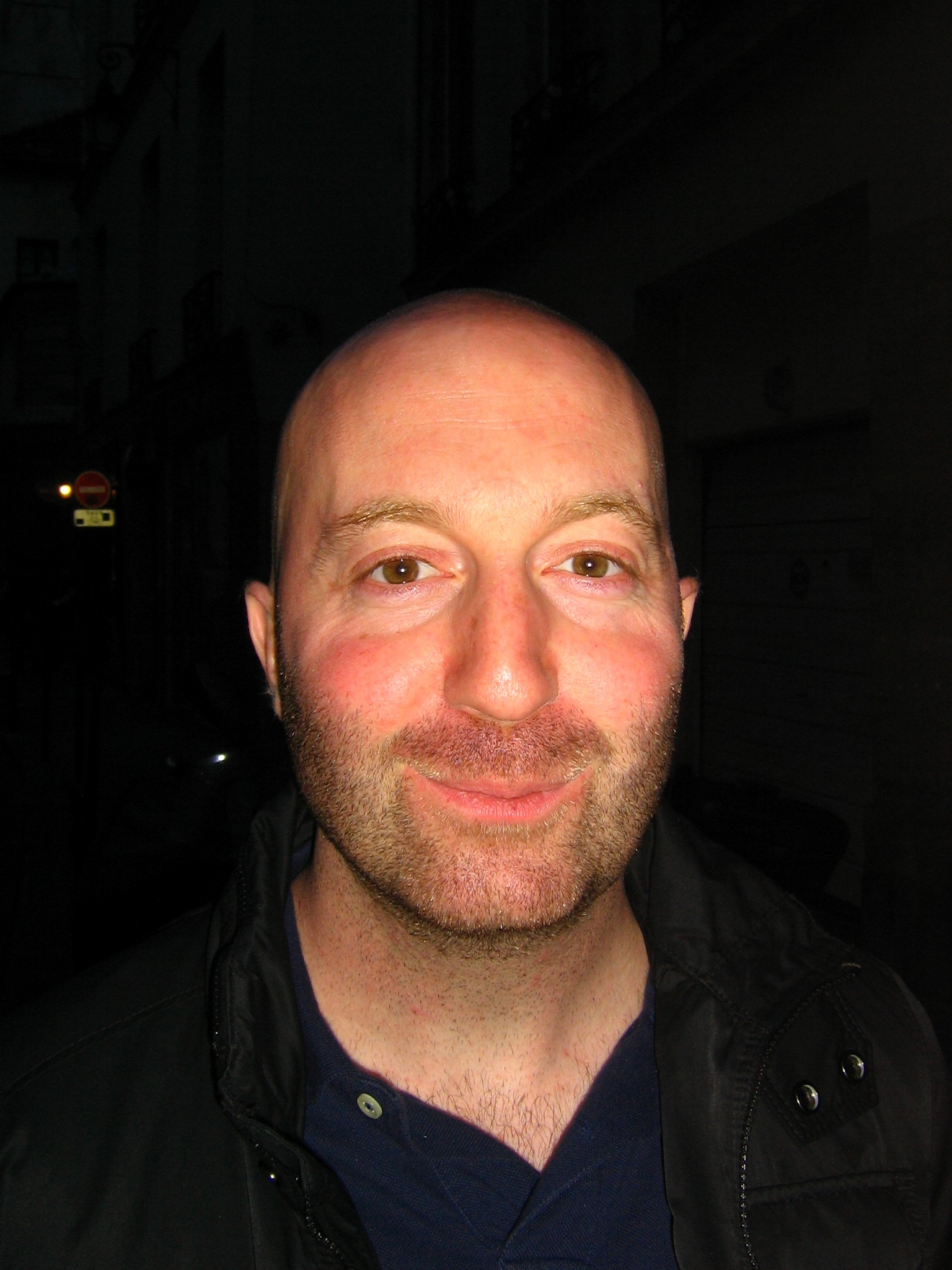
Sacha Judaszko

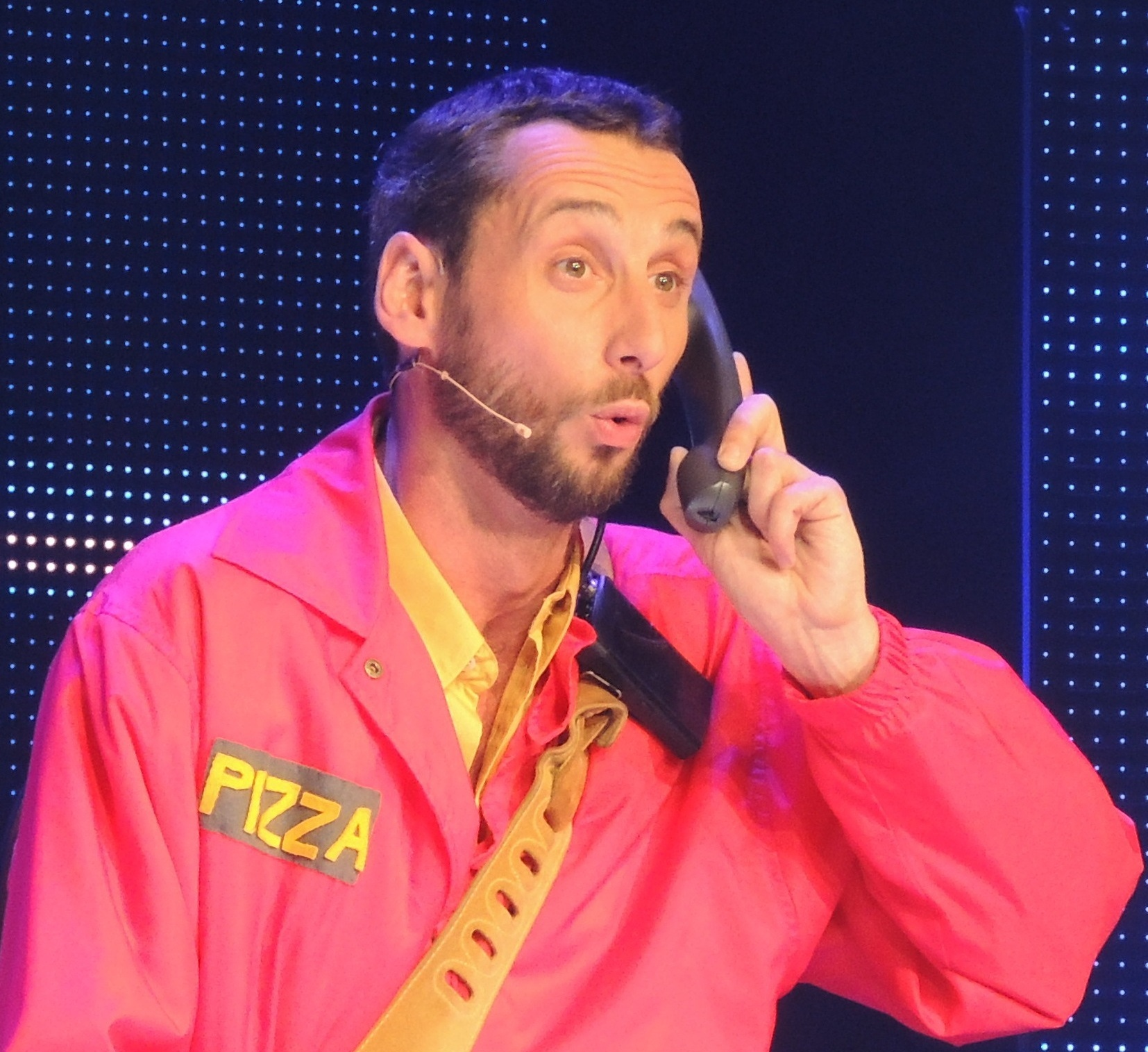
Arnaud Cosson

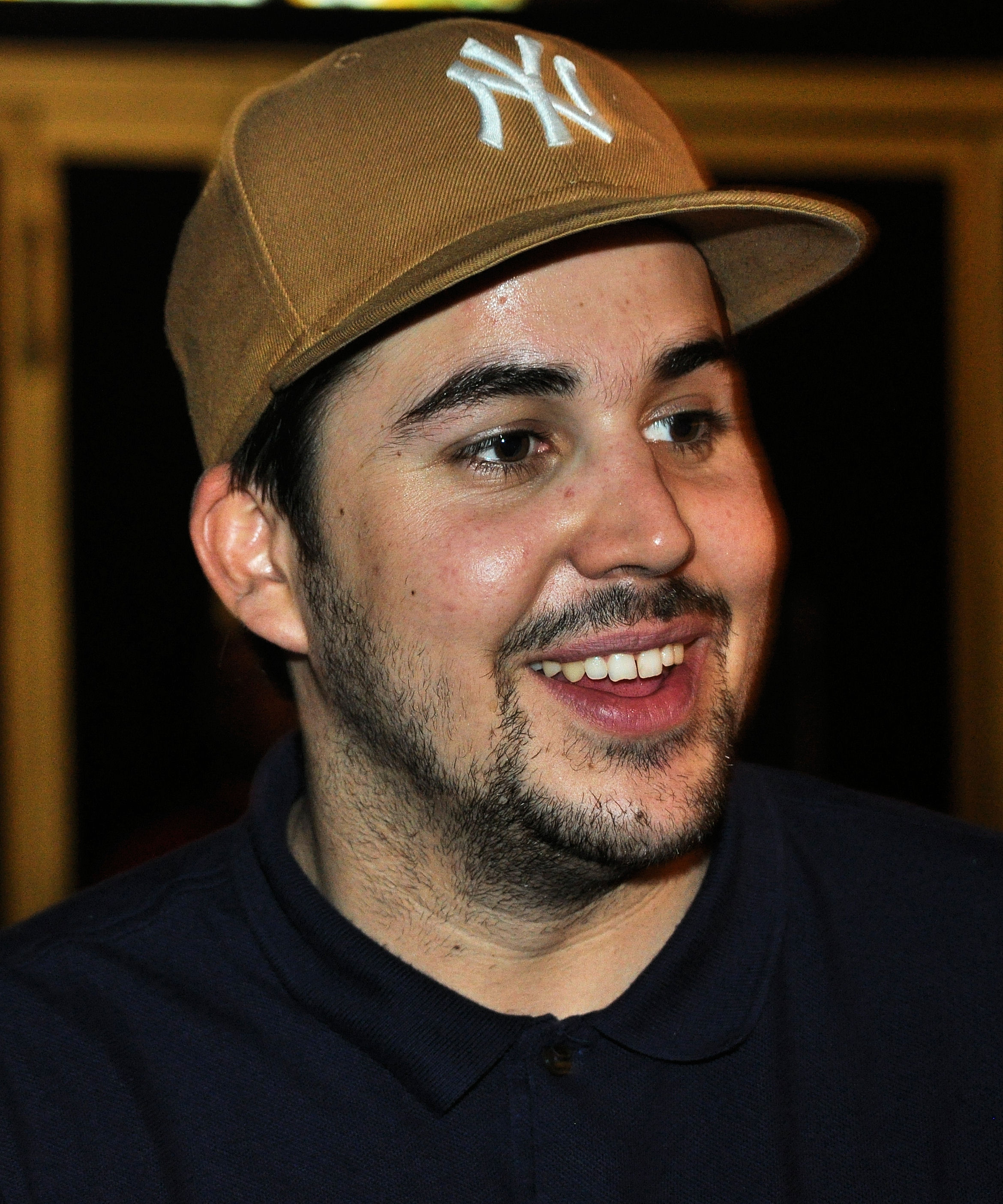
Artus

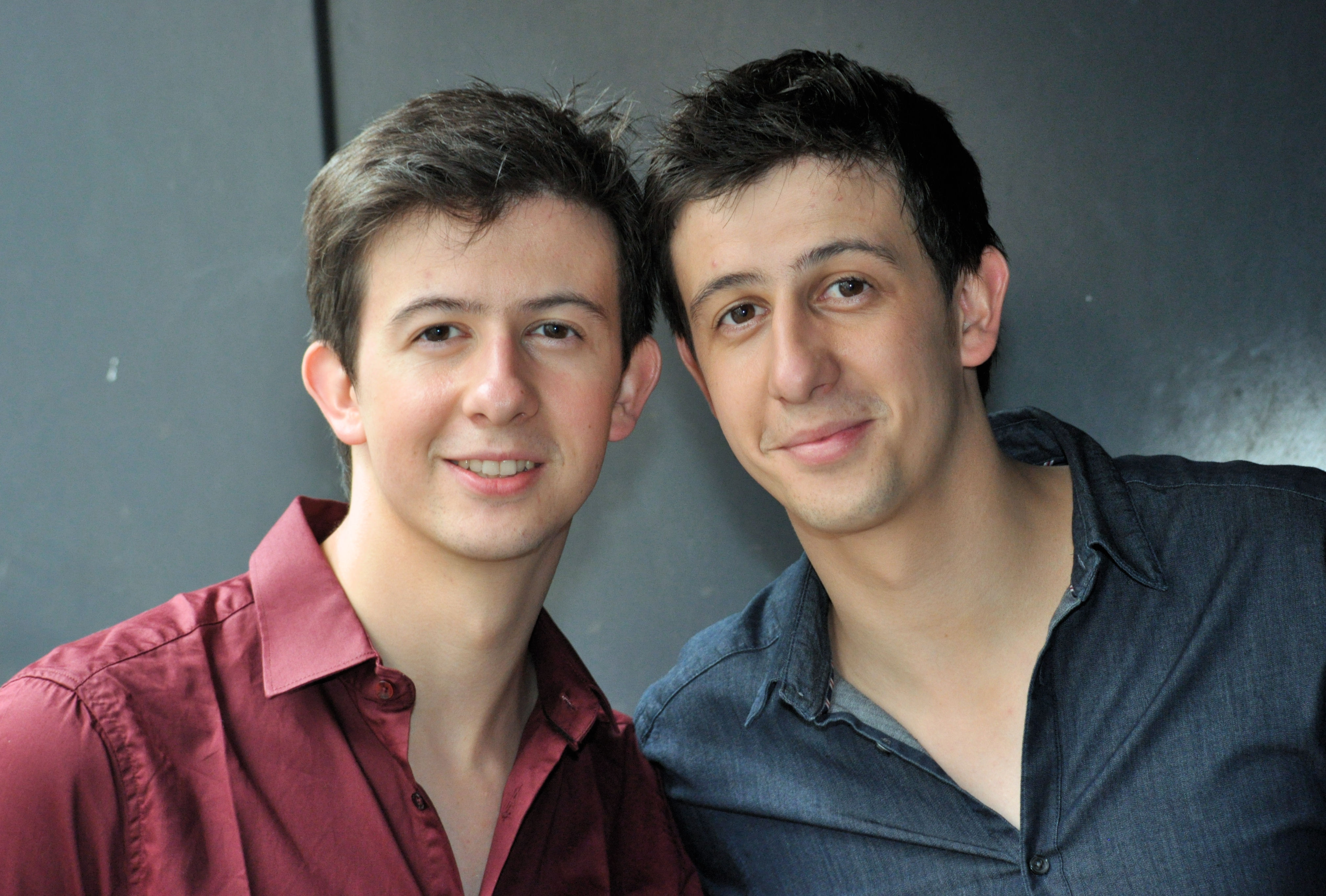
Steeven & Christopher

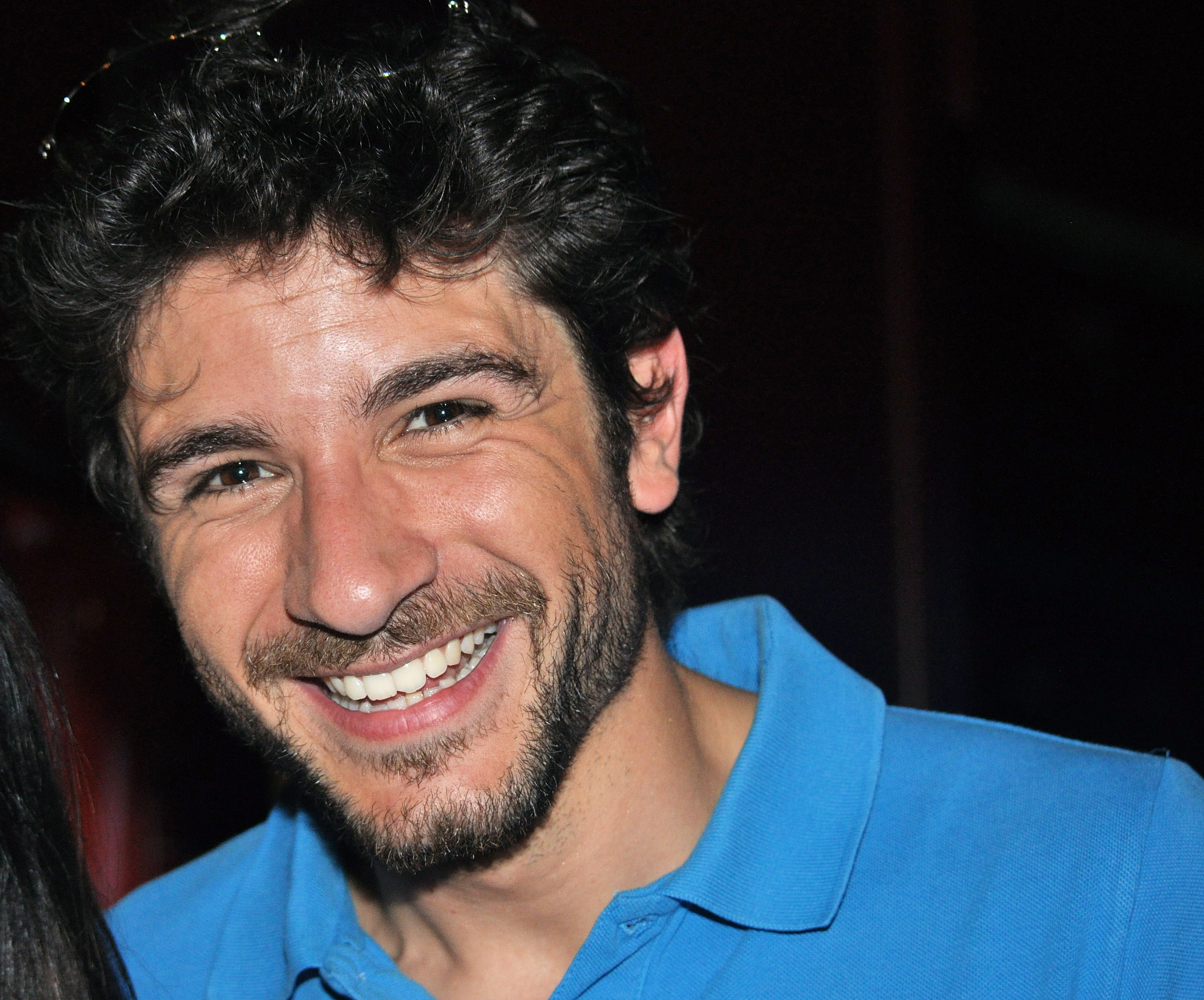
Vérino

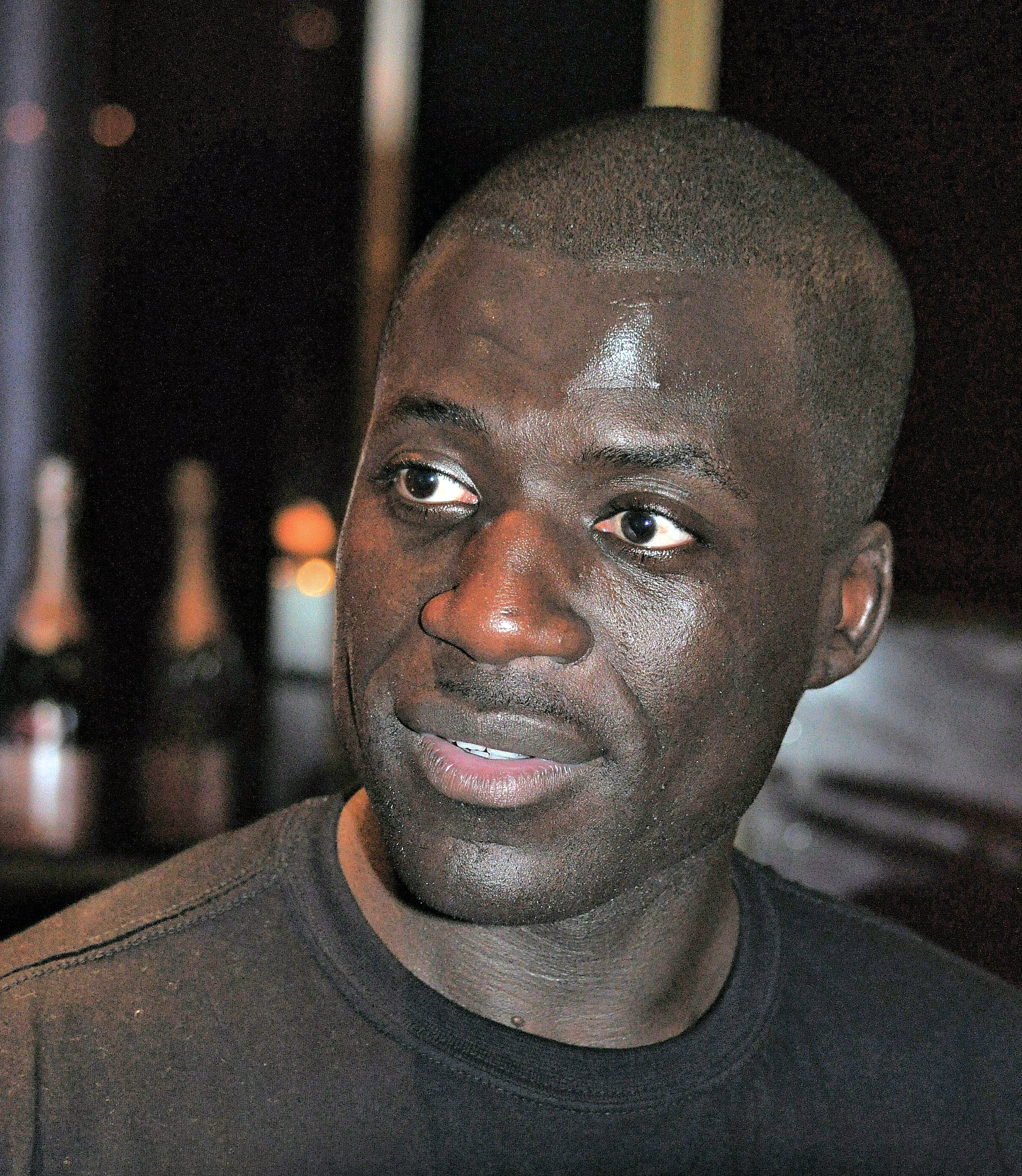
Donel Jack'sman

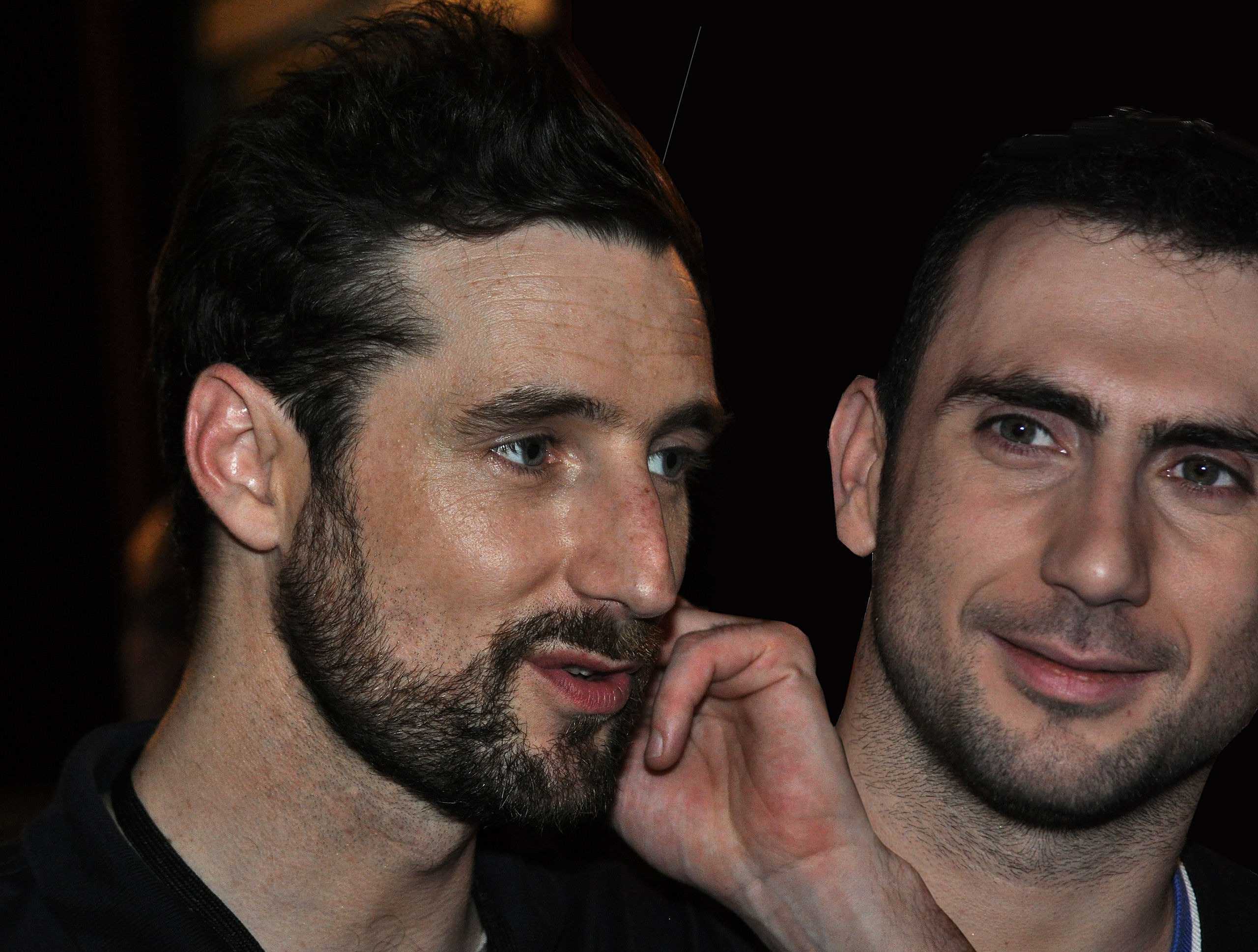
Les Décaféinés

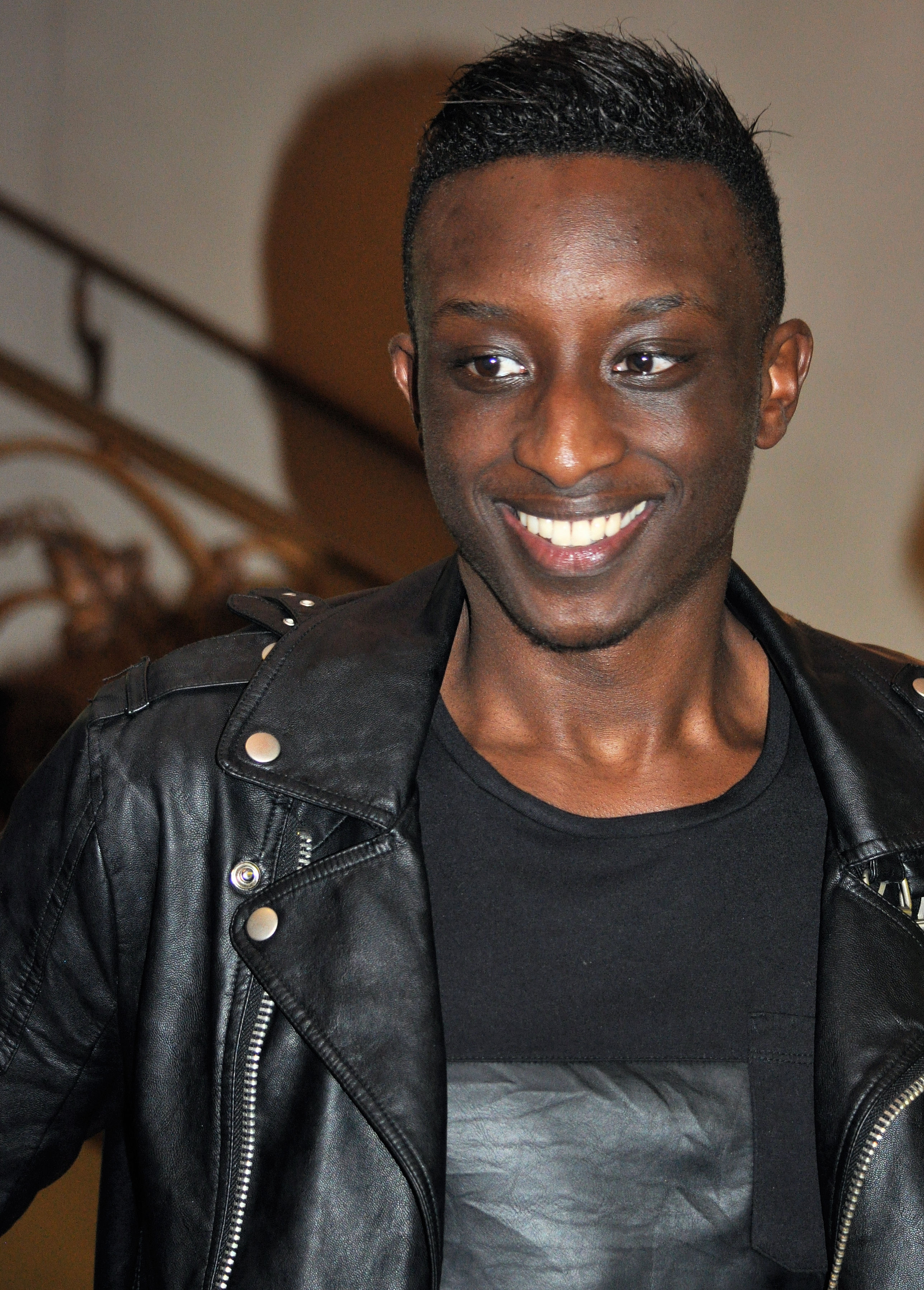
Ahmed Sylla
