= Nicole Ferroni =

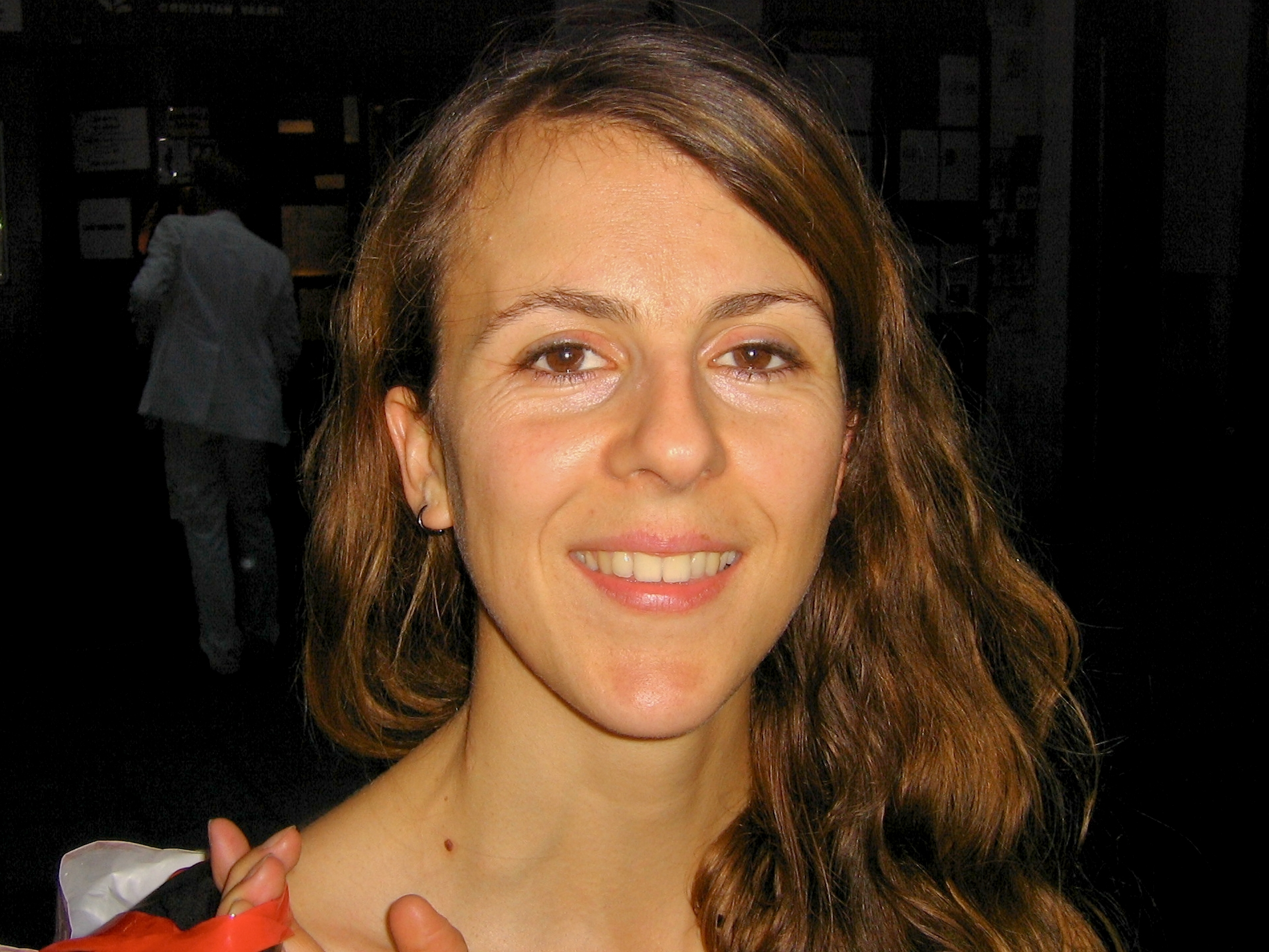
- Nicole Ferroni in July 2011
- Born: 19 March 1982 (age 44); Casablanca, Morocco
- Occupations: Comedian, actress
- Years active: 2003–present
- Notable work: On n'demande qu'à en rire

Nicole Ferroni (born 19 March 1982) is a French comedian, actress, columnist in France Inter and former biology teacher. She is known for participating in Laurent Ruquier's show On n'demande qu'à en rire.

== Selected filmography ==
Year	Title	Role	Notes
2014	L'ex de ma vie	The guide	
2015	I Kissed a Girl	Sarah Deprez	
2018	Guy	Juliette Bose	
