= Florent Peyre =

French comedian (born 1980)

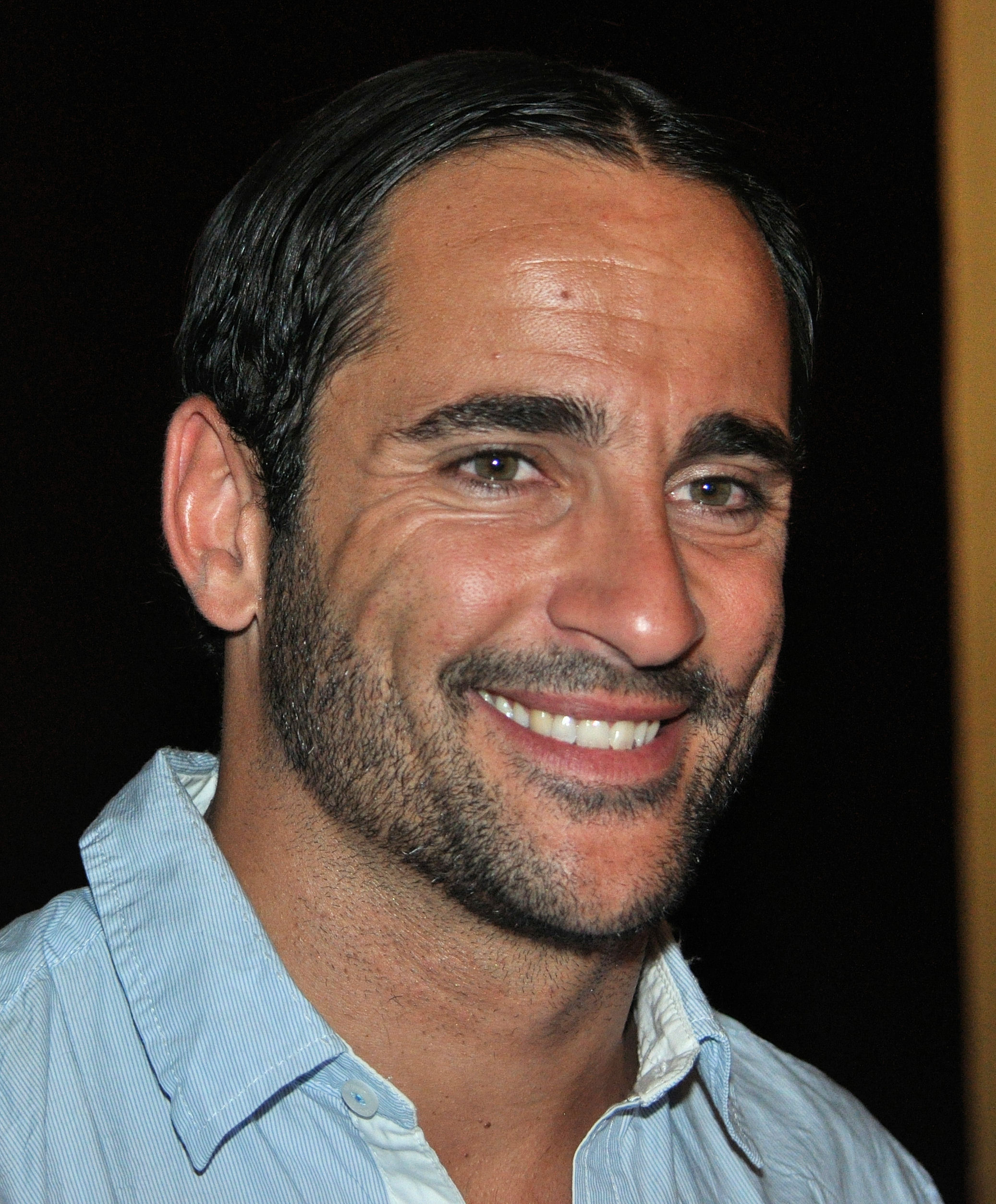
- Florent Peyre at the Casino de Paris on 8 June 2013
- Born: 14 May 1980 (age 45); Valence, Drôme, France
- Occupations: Comedian, actor
- Years active: 2002–present
- Notable work: On n'demande qu'à en rire

Florent Peyre (born 14 May 1980) is a French comedian. He is known for participating in Laurent Ruquier's sketch comedy show On n'demande qu'à en rire.

== Filmography ==
- 2016 : Storks : Junior (French voice)
- 2017 : Raid dingue : Olivier Lopez
- 2021 : Flashback : Napoleon Bonaparte
- 2021 : ‘’Crime á Biot’’ : Grégoire Spaletta
