= L'Hymne du MLF =

French feminist protest song

English: Anthem of the MLF
- Movement anthem of the Women's Liberation Movement of France
- Also known as: Debout les femmes (English: Stand up women)
- Lyrics: collective, March 1971

"L'Hymne du MLF" (English: "Anthem of the MLF"), also known as "Debout les femmes", was written as the anthem of the Women's Liberation Movement (MLF) in France. It was created collectively in March 1971, during the second wave of French feminism, by militant feminist activists in Paris, during a meeting in preparation for a gathering on March 28, 1971, in the Square of Issy-les-Moulineaux, in memory and in honor of the women of the Paris Commune, marking its centennial.

The anthem has been featured in:

- It is sung in the 2015 film La Belle Saison (English title: Summertime), which relates the beginnings of the MLF and the romantic relationship of two female characters who are inspired by two emblematic figures of the MLF, Delphine Seyrig and Carole Roussopoulos.
- In November 2018, on the eve of marches across France observing International Day for the Elimination of Violence against Women, at the call of the #NousToutes Collective, the anthem was recorded by 39 female artists led by the duo Brigitte; among the performers are Olivia Ruiz, La Grande Sophie, Jennifer Ayache, Élodie Frégé, Agnès Jaoui and Barbara Carlotti.
- The anthem was performed by a group of 600 women before the start of the match between Sweden and Chile at the 2019 FIFA Women's World Cup in France, on June 11, 2019, at Roazhon Park in Rennes.
- The 2021 French documentary Debout les femmes! (English title: Those Who Care) uses the anthem in its French title and the song is performed collectively in the last scene by the women whose lives are documented in the film.
- The 2018 recording of the anthem is played during the closing credits of the 2021 French feminist film Flashback, where the credits identify it as "Debout les femmes".
