= À fond =

2016 French film

- Directed by: Nicolas Benamou
- Written by: Fabrice Roger-Lacan; Frédéric Jardin
- Starring: José Garcia; André Dussollier; Caroline Vigneaux; Charlotte Gabris; Vincent Desagnat
- Music by: Michaël Tordjman; Maxime Desprez
- Release date: 21 December 2016
- Running time: 91 minutes
- Countries: France; North Macedonia
- Language: French
- Budget: 13,750,000 euros

À fond is a French-Macedonian comedy film co-written and directed by Nicolas Benamou, released in 2016.

== Plot ==
During the first weekend of July, Tom, a plastic surgeon in Paris, is going on holiday with his wife Julia and their children Lison and Noé in his brand-new Danjoon Medusa, a high-tech car he has just bought. Tom's clumsy, manipulative hippie father Ben joins them without Julia's knowledge. At a motorway service station, Ben secretly lets Melody, a young woman left behind by her mother, into the car. Back on the A6 autoroute, the cruise control jams at 130 km/h and later 160 km/h, and the car can neither slow down nor stop.

== Cast ==
- José Garcia as Tom Cox
- André Dussollier as Ben Cox
- Caroline Vigneaux as Julia Cox
- Charlotte Gabris as Melody Poupart
- Vincent Desagnat as the adjudant-chef Gaspard Besauce
- Josephine Callies as Lison Cox
- Stylane Lecaille as Noé Cox
- Jérôme Commandeur as Danieli, the car dealer
- Ingrid Donnadieu as the gendarme Vignali
- Vladimir Houbart as Jacky, the driver of the yellow BMW E34
- Florence Foresti as Captain Peton
- Harrison Arevalo as Juan, the painter
- Philippe Laudenbach as Monsieur Château Chantelle
- Béatrice Costantini as Madame Sacha Château Chantelle
- Jérôme Lenôtre as the father at the car dealer
- Sissi Duparc as the mother at the car dealer
- Mathieu Barbet as Planton
- Gérard Cherqui as the gendarme playing Ping-Pong
- Christian Hening de Franceschini as the super gendarme
- Anne Ferrier as the voice of the Danjoon Medusa
- Hortense Gelinet as Carine Moulin, BFMTV journalist
- Rachid M'Barki as Rachid, BFMTV journalist

== Production ==
The producers of the film initially planned to shoot a big part of the film on green backgrounds allowing the chroma key of the scenery, but the film was finally shot in live action. The task of the production was complicated, the plot requiring many kilometers of highway.

An agreement was concluded for the use of a stretch of motorway in Macedonia for the most complex scenes, as a result of this agreement, the production team traveled to Macedonia to film there for ten weeks, instead of the three originally planned.

This change to the schedule caused a few problems. Valérie Bonneton, who was set to play the role of Julia, had to drop out of the film due to this relocation. She was subsequently replaced by comedian Caroline Vigneaux, who is less well-known to the general public.

The other issue concerns the Macedonian population, who were rather annoyed because of several motorways closed during the summer period. However, following a public press conference, the problem was resolved, and the production team managed to secure the necessary official permits.

The production team had to bring in a French helicopter for the shoot in Macedonia. As the country only had older aircraft available, it would have been impossible for the pilot to ensure complete safety under those conditions.

== Box office ==
The film debuted at number six at the French box office for the week of 21 to 27 December 2016, with over 386,600 admissions. It ranked seventh the following week, with more than 282,200 admissions. In its third week of release, the film placed tenth at the box office, with over 70,300 admissions. In total, the film reached 950,000 admissions.
