= Bruno Guillon =

French radio and television presenter (born 1971)

- Born: 25 June 1971 (age 54); Saint-Jean-d'Angély, Charente-Maritime, France
- Occupation(s): Radio and television presenter
- Years active: 1996–present
- Notable work: On n'demande qu'à en rire Les Z'amours (2018-)

Bruno Guillon (French pronunciation: [bʁyno ɡijɔ̃]; born 25 June 1971) is a French radio and television presenter. He is known for presenting Laurent Ruquier's sketch comedy show On n'demande qu'à en rire in 2014. He also co-hosted on MCM the special "La Nuit de la pub drole" and "La nuit de la pub sexy" with Val Kahl. In February 2018, animator of France 2: Les Z'amours.

== News item ==
On the night of 26 to 27 September 2023, he was the victim of a burglary and kidnapping with his wife Marion and his son in his home in the village of Tessancourt-sur-Aubette in the Yvelines department. A burglar woke the family from their sleep and pointed a handgun at the presenter's head while his wife and his 14-year-old son were tied up and gagged in the room of the child. The burglars then fled with a sum of 80,000 euros.
