= Raid dingue =

- Directed by: Dany Boon
- Written by: Dany Boon; Sarah Kaminsky
- Produced by: Jérôme Seydoux; Dany Boon; Vivien Aslanian; Romain Le Grand; Patrick Quinet; Eric Hubert; Bruno Morin
- Starring: Alice Pol; Dany Boon; Michel Blanc; Yvan Attal; Sabine Azéma; Patrick Mille; François Levantal; Florent Peyre
- Cinematography: Denis Rouden
- Music by: Maxime Desprez; Michaël Tordjman
- Production company: Pathé
- Distributed by: Pathé
- Release dates: 19 December 2016 (Liévin premiere); 1 February 2017 (France)
- Running time: 105 minutes
- Countries: France; Belgium
- Language: French
- Budget: $35 million
- Box office: $36.4 million

Raid dingue is a 2016 French comedy film written and directed by Dany Boon.

== Plot ==
Johanna Pasquali (Alice Pol) is a young woman who dreams to be part of the elite national security force RAID. Her father is Interior Minister Jacques Pasquali, who pulls strings to get her in as a trainee with the condition that his involvement remains secret. He secretly plans to make his daughter disillusioned with RAID and no longer want to be part of it. Johanna and the other trainees are the responsibility of Eugène Froissard (Dany Boon), whose wife has left him for his brother and is regarded as a jinx by his colleagues. Froissard is furious at the idea of a woman being part of RAID, and intends to find any excuse to make Johanna leave.

== Cast ==
- Alice Pol as Johanna Pasquali
- Dany Boon as Eugène Froissard
- Michel Blanc as Jacques Pasquali
- Yvan Attal as Viktor
- Sabine Azéma as Marie-Caroline Dubarry
- Patrick Mille as Edouard Dubarry
- François Levantal as Patrick Legrand
- Florent Peyre as Olivier Lopez
- Anne Marivin as The psychologist
- Alain Doutey as Bernard Dubarry
- Urbain Cancelier as The president of the Republic
- Sâm Mirhosseini as Ivan

== Production ==
Dany Boon stated the original idea for the film came to him "almost 10 years ago.", at that he would originally play Alice's role in the film. To prepare for the film, Boon met with France's RAID (France's equivalent of the FBI's Hostage Rescue Team) in June 2014. After the Charlie Hebdo shooting, Boon changed the ending of the film.

Raid dingue was set to start shooting in France and Belgium in late February 2016.

== Release ==
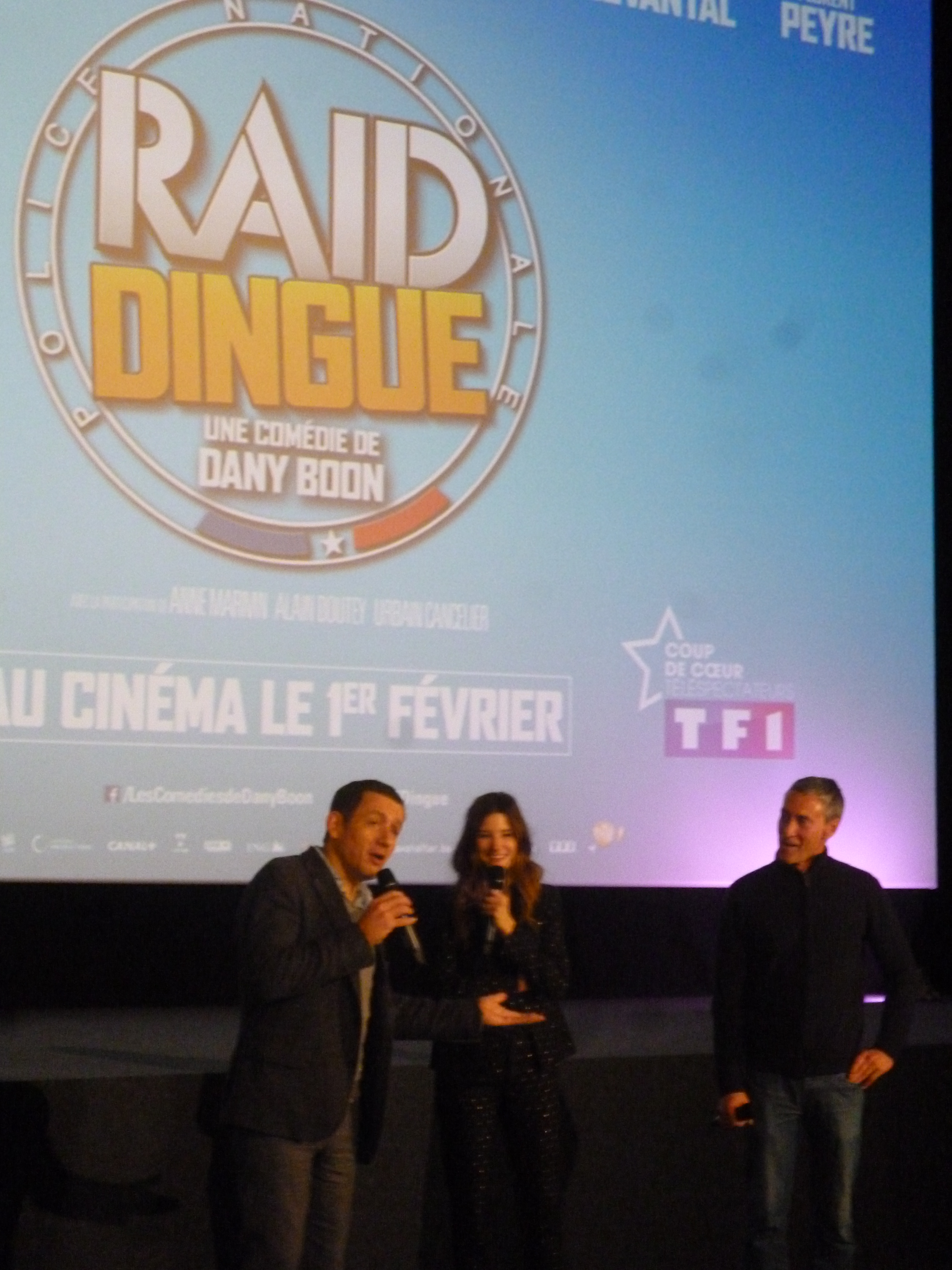
Dany Boon, Alice Pol et François Levantal presenting the film on January 25

Raid dingue opened in France on 1 February 2017. The film grossed $31.6 million for Pathé, taking second place in the 2017 box office as of the end of November.
