= Caroline Vigneaux =

French comedian

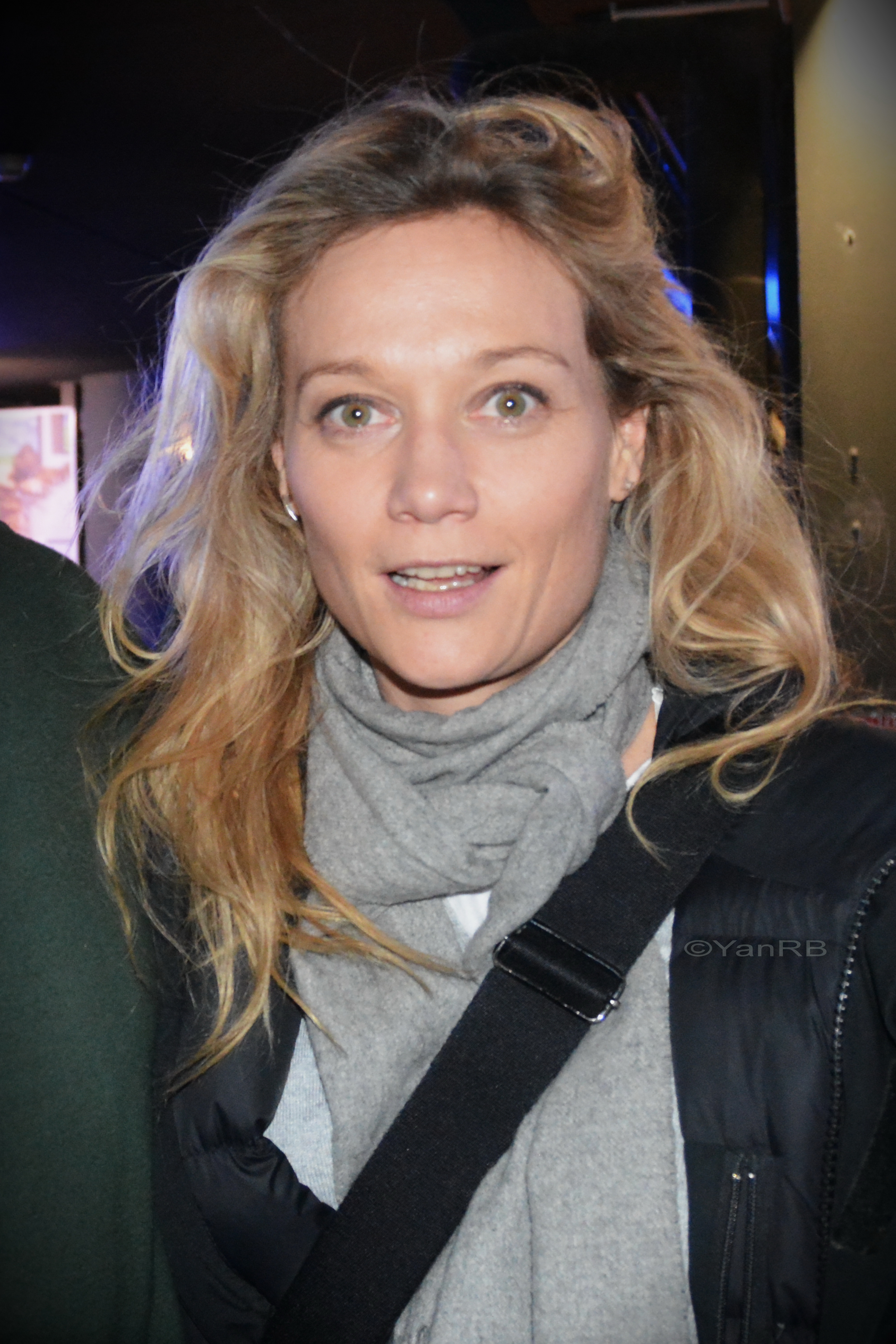
- Caroline Vigneaux in 2018
- Born: 27 January 1975; Nantes
- Occupation: Screenwriter
- Website: www.carolinevigneaux.fr

Caroline Vigneaux (born 27 January 1975) is a French writer, actress, and comedian.

== Life ==
Caroline Vigneaux was born on 27 January 1975 in Nantes. Her father is an engineer and her mother a speech therapist. After being sent by her parents to Catholic private schools, Caroline Vigneaux studied at Pantheon-Sorbonne University and obtained a law degree and a Master II Insurance and Civil Liability degree. She went on to take the entrance examination at the Law School to practice as a lawyer. In 2000, she obtained the Certificate of Proficiency in Law, took an oath and became a member of the Paris Bar. She joined the theater troupe of the Union of Young Lawyers in 2001, a troupe writing sketches about the life of the Paris Bar.

In 2001, the Granrut business firm hired her as a collaborating lawyer; she stayed there four years.

In 2004, Vigneaux was elected 11th secretary of the conference of the internship at the end of the contest of eloquence of the Conference of the Bar of Paris.

In 2005, she joined the American firm Dewey & LeBoeuf and stayed there for two years.

In 2006, she was one of the lawyers at the end of the debates on the show L'Arène de France, on France 2.

In 2008, she submitted her resignation to the partners of the firm Dewey & LeBoeuf, and enrolled at the Cours Florent drama school. In 2009, she started as a humourist with her one-woman show, playing a "crazy" fairy who has taken possession of Vigneaux's body. It was performed at the Avignon Festival, then at the Théâtre des Blancs-Manteaux, in Paris.

In 2010, while on tour for her second show, Vigneaux announced at the Festival d'Avignon that she was leaving her law career behind.

In 2011, Stéphane Bern hired her as a columnist for RTL's "À la bonne heure".

She participated in "Only Wanted to laugh" with Laurent Ruquier on France 2, performing three sketches on 15 February 21 February, and 12 December 2011.

In 2013, Anne Roumanoff offered her a role in her television series "C'est la crise !," broadcast on Comédie+. She played Isla Hildeu in the television series Lazy Company broadcast on Orange Cinema Series. She also played in the series "La Télé commande" with Elie Semoun, broadcast on the program "So Far All Right."

She had a podcast called, Coachcast by Caroline Vigneaux. Caroline Vigneaux changed her life 17 years ago, going from being a lawyer to a comedian. In her podcast she aimed to share her experience to help others who are considering making a big change in their lives, by coaching a stranger for 20 minutes, live, face-to-face. On the podcast she welcomed inspiring people who have taken the plunge and come to share their experiences and advice.

== Filmography ==
- 2013 : C'est la crise : Sidonie
- 2013 – 2014 : Lazy Company : Isla Hildeu
- 2014 : L'esprit de famille (téléfilm) : ophthalmologist.
- 2015 : On voulait tout casser Anne-Marie.
- 2016 : À fond, de Nicolas Benamou : Julia.
- 2021 : Flashback as Charlie Leroy (also director)
