= TF6 =

- Country: France

Programming
- Picture format: 576i (16:9 SDTV); 1080i (HDTV)

Ownership
- Owner: M6 Group (50%); TF1 Group (50%)

History
- Launched: 18 December 2000
- Closed: 31 December 2014

Availability

Terrestrial
- TNT: Channel 46

TF6 was a French mini general-interest entertainment television channel aimed at young adult viewers. It existed between 18 December 2000 and 31 December 2014. The drop in viewership since 2009 and the failure of pay-TV via DTT were the causes of the channel ceasing broadcast.

== History ==
TF6 was founded in December 2000 by M6 and TF1 when they decided to merge their two competitor family project channels on the satellite service TPS, of which they are the two co-shareholders. This merger led the two groups to create a common company integrating TF6 and SerieClub and whose two groups are shareholders with 50%. That allows the new channel to make use of series and cinema catalogues of its two owners and to propose a richer offer. On 24 April 2014, TF1 and M6 announced the final closure of TF6 due to low audiences since 2009. The channel ceased broadcasting on 31 December 2014 at 11:59 p.m., using the song "Love Me Again" by John Newman to close broadcasting. SerieClub replaced TF6 on Canalsat Caraïbes.

== Organisation ==
Chairman of the board:

- Laurent Solly

Director general:

- Vincent Broussard

Deputy Director General:

- Thomas Crosson

== Capital ==
TF6 has a capital of €80,000 held with parity by Group TF1 and M6 Group.

== Programs ==
TF6 broadcast shows intended for young adults, these included genres such as reality television, entertainment, films and magazines.

Some of the shows included:

- 24 (24 heures chrono)
- Cold Case (Cold Case : Affaires classées)
- Gossip Girl
- Law & Order (New York, police judiciaire)
- Nashville
- New Girl
- Nikita
- The Oblongs
- The O.C. (Newport Beach)
- Supernatural
- Smallville
- Special Unit 2
- Terminator: The Sarah Connor Chronicles (Terminator : Les Chroniques de Sarah Connor)
