= Jérémy Michalak =

French television presenter and producer (born 1980)

- Born: 28 October 1980 (age 44); Saint-Maur-des-Fossés, Val-de-Marne, France
- Occupation(s): Television presenter, producer
- Years active: 1998–present
- Notable work: On n'demande qu'à en rire, Face à la bande

Jérémy Michalak (born 28 October 1980) is a French television presenter and producer. He is known for presenting the sketch comedy show On n'demande qu'à en rire after he took over from Laurent Ruquier in 2012.

== Biography ==
Michalak was born on October 28, 1980, in Saint-Maur-des-Fossés in the Val-de-Marne.

== Career ==
=== Radio career ===
On March 27, 2015, he made his first appearance on Laurent Ruquier's program Les Grosses Têtes on RTL.

At the start of the 2016 school year, he was announced as a columnist on Alessandra Sublet's new show, broadcast from 3:30 p.m. to 5 p.m. on Europe 1.

=== TV career ===
From 2001 to 2002, he played a role in Le Groupe, a series by Jean-Luc Azoulay and Bénédicte Laplace.

In 2010, he became editor-in-chief of the TV version of On va s'gêner, every month on France 4.

From September 2009 to June 2014, during the first five seasons of the show, he was a columnist in the daily C à vous between 7 p.m. and 8 p.m. on France 5.

From September 3, 2012, to June 28, 2013, he hosted On n'demande qu'à en rire on France 2, replacing Laurent Ruquier.
