= Laroche-Valmont =

- Birth name: Jean-Quentin Gérard
- Origin: France
- Genres: Pop
- Occupation: Singer
- Years active: 1984–1989
- Website: Official site

Jean-Quentin Gérard, better known by his stage name Laroche-Valmont, is a French singer and a press publisher. His 1984 single "T'as le Look Coco" made him a one-hit wonder.

== Publishing career ==
In the early 1980s, he created several magazines such as Hit magazine, Stéphanie, Super Géant, Privé and books on Claude François, Mesrine, Nostradamus and Coluche.

== Music career ==
In 1984, he had success with his hit "T'as le look coco", which peaked at #7 on the SNEP singles chart. His later singles including "Tonsign atoi sekoi", "Alors... heureuse ?", "Faut pas décoder" and "Petite fille de branchés moyens" passed almost unnoticed and failed to be ranked. He performed two shows: Break Dance & Smurf (1983–1984) and T'as le look fluo (1985–1989), which he performed on more than 1,000 occasions. After the last of his singles were released, he stopped his singing career and once again took up his work as a magazine publisher, including the publications R.A.P. R&B and ROCKMAG.

== Discography ==
=== Singles ===
- 1984 : "L'amur... Tujurs L'amur"
- 1984 : "Je Suis Maniaque des Manettes"
- 1984 : "T'as le Look Coco" – #7 in France
- 1985 : "Tonsign Atoi Sekoi",
- 1985 : "Alors... Heureuse ?"
- 1986 : "Faut pas Décoder"
- 1987 : "Petite Fille de Branchés Moyens"
- 2018 : "T'as le look min tchiot"
- 2020 : album "T'as le look coco & Co" (Musiques & Solutions)
- 2021 : CD Laroche Valmont (Marianne Mélodie)
- 2021 : single "Toutes les aventures s'achèvent à Ibiza" (VMusic Production)
