= Catherine Barma =

French television producer (born 1945)

- Born: 26 October 1945 (age 79); Nice, Alpes-Maritimes, France
- Occupation: Television producer
- Years active: 1985–present
- Notable work: On n'demande qu'à en rire
- Spouse: Philippe Lefebvre

Catherine Simone Barma (born 26 October 1945) is a French television producer. She is of Italian origin, and the daughter of director Claude Barma. She is known for the comedy series On n'demande qu'à en rire, which she produces, is presented by Laurent Ruquier and in which she appeared as a jury member.
