= Arnaud Tsamere =

French comedian and actor (born 1975)

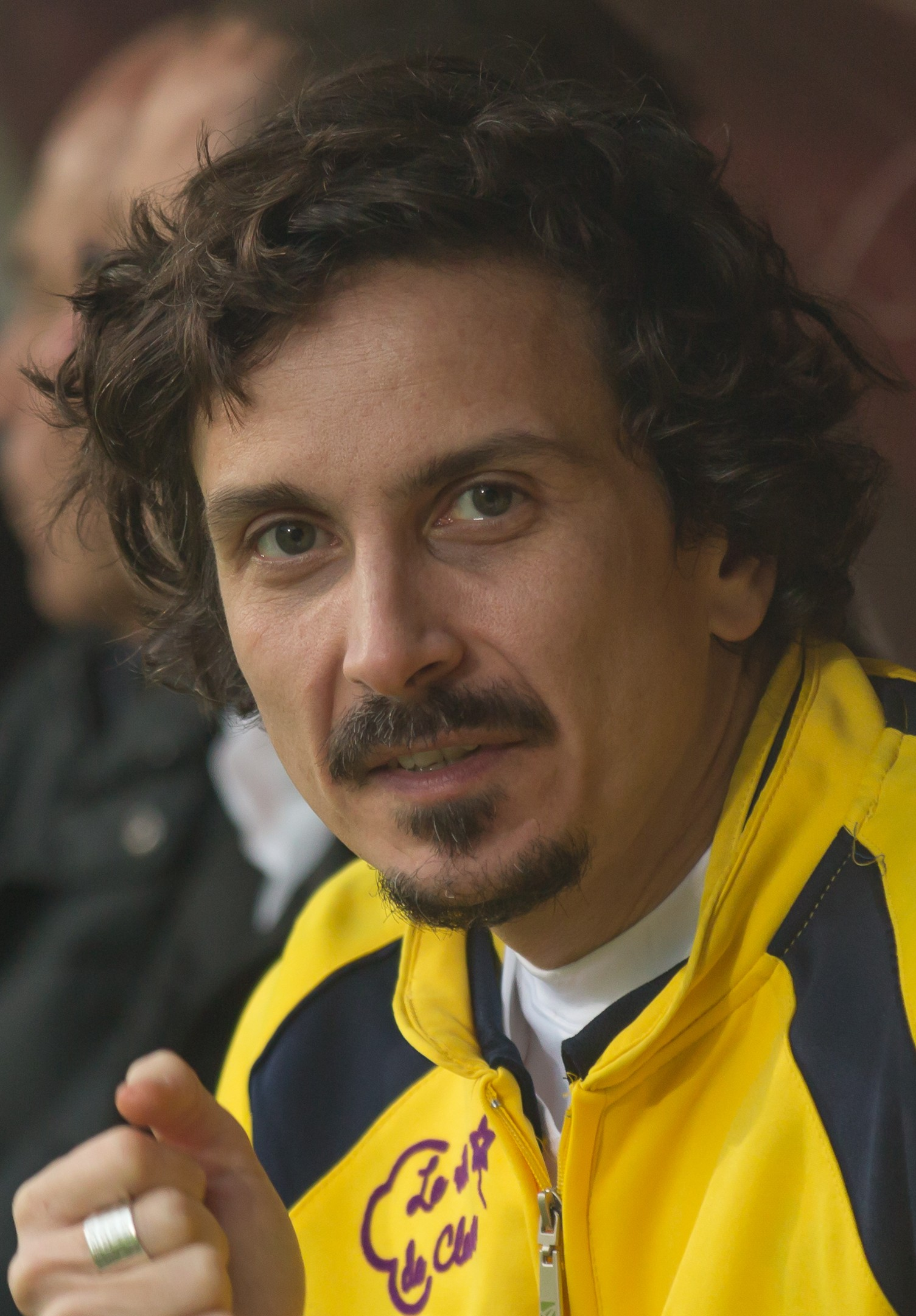
- Tsamere at a charity football match for Le rêve de Clara in November 2013
- Born: Arnaud Tsedri; 11 March 1975 (age 51); Bordeaux, Gironde, France
- Occupations: Comedian, actor, presenter, sports journalist
- Years active: 2001–present
- Notable work: On n'demande qu'à en rire, Hero Corp
- Style: Surreal humour
- Website: arnaudtsamere.com

Arnaud Tsedri (born 11 March 1975), better known by the stage name Arnaud Tsamere (Note: Often written in the press with a grave accent as Arnaud Tsamère; however, Tsamere's own website and Twitter account omit the accent.) (French: [aʁno tsamɛʁ]), is a French comedian, actor, television presenter and sports journalist. Born in Bordeaux and raised in the Yvelines, he joined the Déclic Théâtre group after quitting his sales job. There, he acted in plays and participated in improvisation events. He wrote his first one-man show, Réflexions profondes sur pas mal de trucs, in 2002 with Arnaud Joyet, and his second, Chose Promise, in 2007 with Joyet and François Rollin. His third, Confidences sur pas mal de trucs plus ou moins confidentiels, has been performed since 2014. He has attended numerous comedy festivals and is currently a member of the Ligue Majeure d'Improvisation.

Tsamere's television career began when he presented the weather forecast on Canal+. From 2010, he became well known for appearing on France 2's sketch comedy show On n'demande qu'à en rire—and its short-lived spin-off the ONDAR Show—after he was discovered by Laurent Ruquier; he often performed sketches with Jérémy Ferrari. He also plays Captain Sport Extrême in the comedy science fiction programme Hero Corp. In 2014, he hosted TMC's Canapé Quiz; he has also appeared on various French talk, sports and game shows. Tsamere has acted in several films, including the short Being Homer Simpson with Philippe Peythieu and Véronique Augereau, and Fonzy, a 2013 adaptation of Starbuck.

== Early life ==
Tsamere's paternal grandparents are from Guipavas, and his father is Breton. He was born in Bordeaux, but grew up in Versailles, Rocquencourt and Trappes, in the Yvelines department. His father was a general in the French Air Force who was awarded the Legion of Honour, and his mother a housewife, whom he has described as "the best in her domain". (Note: Original: la meilleure dans son domaine) He has two brothers. He describes himself as having had a "strict upbringing". (Note: Original: éducation rigoureuse)

Speaking about his early life and its relation to his surreal comic style, Tsamere said:

I grew up in a very comfortable environment. I wanted for nothing; serious things never happened to me in life. I have never been a victim of injustice, so I have nothing to protest. I don't have any particular origins which would be interesting to talk about. ... So, I do absurd stuff because I don't want to talk about other things. (Note: Original: J'ai grandi dans un univers très confortable ... voilà, j'ai manqué de rien, il m'est jamais arrivé des choses graves dans la vie, j'ai jamais été victime d'injustice et donc j'ai rien à revendiquer. J'ai pas d'origines particulières en tout cas qui soient intéressantes d'en parler ... donc, je fais de l'absurde parce que j'ai pas envie de parler d'autre chose, en fait.)

After getting his baccalauréat, he studied law at university, where he discovered an improvisational match in his first year and "fell in love" with the performance. In 1998, he obtained a master's degree in business law and later got a job working in export sales. However, he realised that he "could no longer live without the stage", (Note: Original: je ne pouvais plus vivre sans la scène) and on the advice of his friend Arnaud Joyet and Déclic Théâtre co-founder Alain Degois, quit his job and launched his career as a comedian.

== Career ==
=== Theatre and improvisation ===
I owe it to my first improvisation match in public in 1994. The theme was "The life of my mother"... and I didn't say a word! Arnaud Joyet, who was my coach, was tearing his hair out. The next day, my mates said: "Look, here's Arnaud, he's going to talk about his mother [sa mère]"

— Tsamere on the origin of his stage name (Note: Original: Je le dois à mon premier match d’impro en public en 1994. Le thème était « La vie de ma mère »... et je n’ai pas sorti un mot ! Arnaud Joyet, qui était mon coach, s'arrachait les cheveux. Le lendemain, mes camarades m'ont dit : « Tiens, voilà Arnaud, il va nous parler de sa mère… »)

After quitting his previous job, Tsamere took part in the Déclic Théâtre improvisation group under its co-founder Alain "Papy" Degois, who he said "pushed me, gave me confidence, coddled me [and] got me to act in plays and improvisation matches". (Note: Original: me pousse, me donne confiance, me couve, me fait jouer des pièces de théâtre et des matchs d'impro) Between 2003 and 2005, he played the baron Christian de Neuvillette in an adaptation of Cyrano de Bergerac at the Château de Gizeux with the theatre group La Pastière, to which he was introduced by Degois.

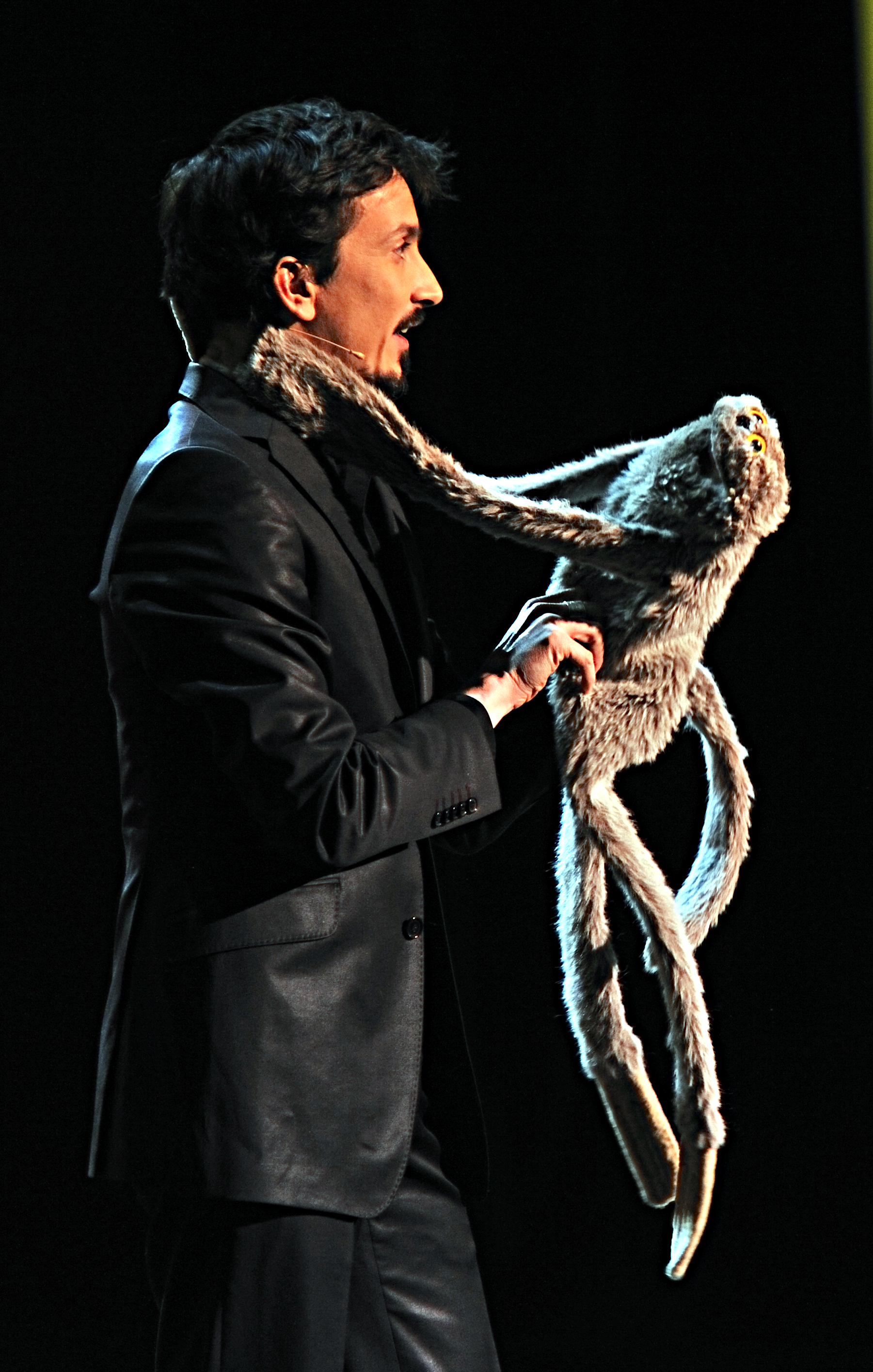
Tsamere performing at the Montreux Comedy Festival with his puppet Falzouille. It originally belonged to Alain Degois's son, and he uses it to perform ventriloquism routines.

He began writing his first one-man show in 2002 with his friend Arnaud Joyet, inspired by a videotape of comedian François Rollin. The show, entitled Réflexions profondes sur pas mal de trucs (Profound reflections on quite a few things), played on theatrical "flops", a form of humour that Tsamere said "can seem easy [but] is not when you really start to work on it". (Note: Original: peut paraître un peu de la facilité. En tout cas, ce ne l'est pas quand on commence à le travailler vraiment...) It was performed at the Blancs Manteaux theatre from April 2005 to January 2006.

Tsamere met Rollin at the Dinard Comedy Festival, and he joined Tsamere and Joyet to write a second show, Chose Promise (Promised Thing). Written in 2007, it stars Tsamere as an economics teacher named Patrice Valenton, performing as part of a promise made to a friend who died in a car accident. He chose to perform as a character under Rollin's suggestion, so that he could depict failure under the guise of somebody who is not a comedian. Regarding the show's theme of death, he said "It's a bit strange, but it has the virtue of attracting the public's attention". (Note: Original: c'est un petit peu bizarre mais ça a le mérite d'attirer l'attention du public) Tsamere's performance was well received by critics; Le Parisien called the show a "masterpiece of the genre". (Note: Original: chef-d'œuvre du genre) Chose Promise was released on DVD on 6 March 2013 after being recorded at the Théâtre Sébastopol in Lille. Tsamere has done three tours of the show, and its final two performances were at the Olympia in February 2014.

Tsamere's third show, Confidences sur pas mal de trucs plus ou moins confidentiels (Secrets about quite a few more or less confidential things), also written with Rollin and Joyet, was performed on tour throughout France from November 2014, and at Le Splendid from January 2015. Tsamere has said it is based on the principal that "society laughs too much", (Note: Original: la société rigole trop) and will involve him talking about himself.

On 25 June 2012 at the Européen theatre, Tsamere performed alongside the On n'demande qu'à en rire jury member Éric Métayer in Métamère en impro. He performed La tournée du trio with his On n'demande qu'à en rire colleague Jérémy Ferrari, and Baptiste Lecaplain; after a tour of 12 performances in Zéniths, they did several special performances in February 2014. Tsamere has attended comedy festivals such as the Montreux Comedy Festival, where he performed with Ferrari, and the Avignon Festival. He is now part of the Ligue Majeure d'Improvisation.

=== Television and radio ===
In 2005, with the help of Frédéric Testot, whom he met at a Puy-Saint-Vincent comedy festival, Tsamere got the job of presenting the weather forecast in Le Grand Journal on Canal+. He also appeared in Canal+'s SAV des émissions, presented by Testot and Omar Sy. After quitting the weather in June 2006, he hosted La longue nuit du pénis on the same channel that September. It was a night dedicated to the penis, which Tsamere has described as "nothing pornographic or erotic. It was a series of serious documentaries." (Note: Original: Rien de porno ni d'érotique. C'était une série de docs sérieux.) He says he was asked after Frédérique Bel refused, because he was "probably the only one liable to accept". (Note: Original: Le seul sans doute susceptible d'accepter)

In 2007 Tsamere met Simon Astier during the recording of the M6 show Off Prime. He was given the role of Captain Sport Extrême in Astier's comedy science fiction programme, Hero Corp, which is broadcast on France 4. He only appeared in one episode of the first series, but more frequently in the second. Speaking about the differences between himself and his character, Tsamere said "He is a misogynist, beastly, an adventurer, unattached... I am just the opposite". (Note: Original: Il est misogyne, bourrin, aventurier, n'a pas d'attaches etc...Je suis tout le contraire.) He also said "I've loved this character. I love playing crackpots." (Note: Original: J’ai adoré ce personnage. J’adore jouer les branquignoles.)

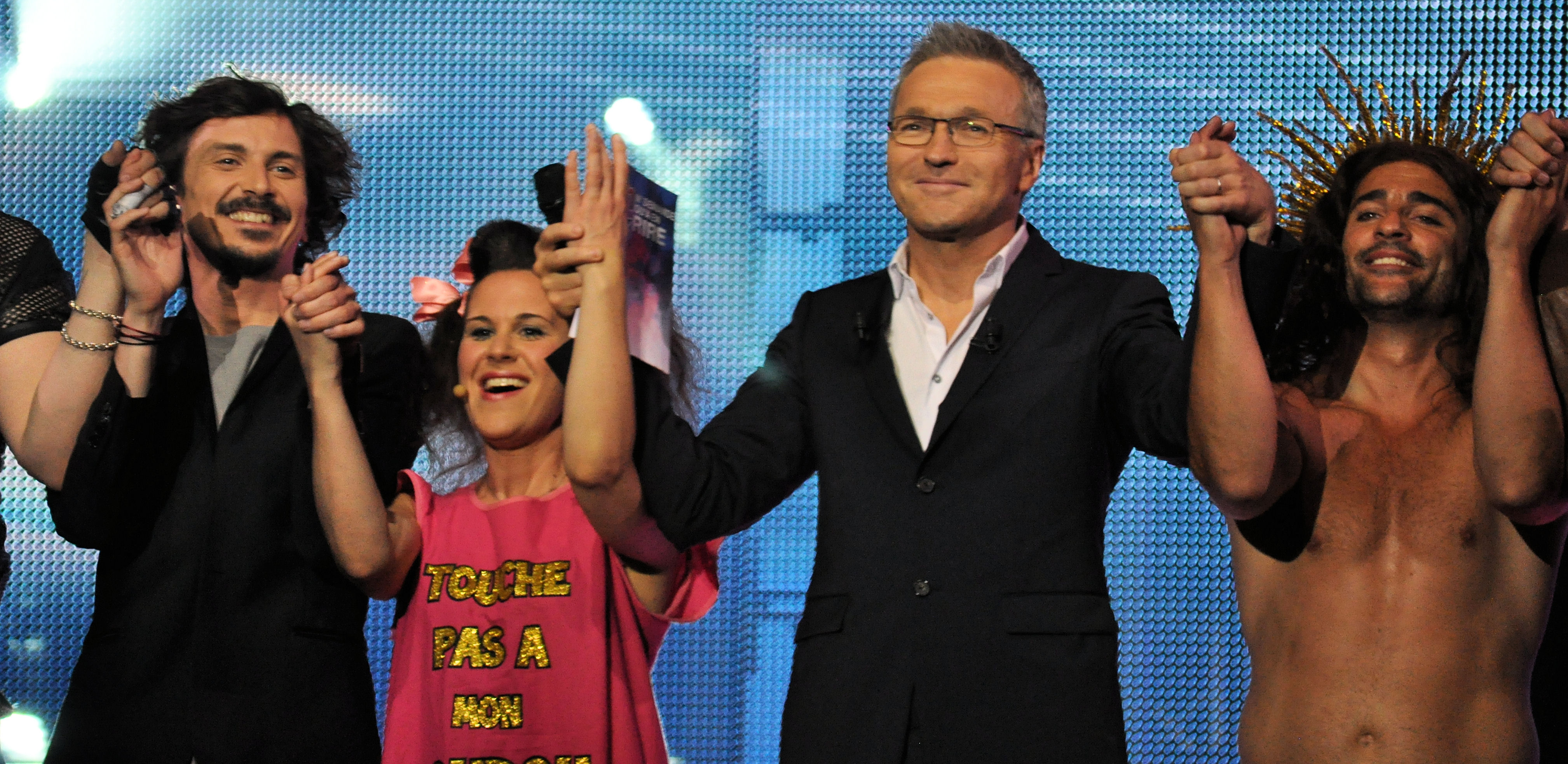
Tsamere (left) with Antonia, Laurent Ruquier and Florent Peyre at the Casino de Paris

In 2010 he participated in the sketch comedy talent show On n'demande qu'à en rire, created and presented by Laurent Ruquier and broadcast on France 2. Ruquier asked him to do so after he saw Tsamere in Monique est demandée caisse 12 and Le Comique. He has described it as "the missing piece of the puzzle" (Note: Original: la pièce qui manquait au puzzle) that allowed him to become well known. He already knew all of the original participants, except for Nicole Ferroni, whom he discovered at a comedy festival in Puy-Saint-Vincent in January 2011. He is friends with Jérémy Ferrari, with whom he has performed sketches on the show. The two share a well known on-stage rivalry.

Based on puns involving crime and food, his sketch "L'avocat de la salade, la frite et la saucisse" was the first in the programme to achieve 99 out of 100 points. After participating in the show for two years and totalling 64 appearances, Tsamere announced in 2012 that he did not plan to return for its third season. However, he came back the next year after the cancellation of the ONDAR Show, and described his stage fright before his first performance after his return. When the show returned for its fourth season, he acted as patron (parrain) during the first week, and could save and work with eliminated candidates.

In September 2011, Tsamere appeared with On n'demande qu'à en rire colleague Jérémy Ferrari in two editions of Ruquier's late-night talk show On n'est pas couché—however, in what would have been their third week, they decided to quit the show as they thought that "our duo was not the right formula to succeed Jonathan [Lambert, their predecessor]", (Note: Original: notre duo n'était pas la bonne formule pour succéder à Jonathan) as well as to concentrate on their "solo projects". (Note: Original: projets solo) From October 2012 to January 2013, Tsamere took part in the ONDAR Show, a spin-off of On n'demande qu'à en rire in which its best comedians performed without judges in a format similar to American entertainment. However, the show was unpopular with critics—Le Nouvel Observateur's Xavier Rousseau called it a "failed show" that "dashed hopes" (Note: Original: Un show raté et des espoirs déchus)—and the ONDAR Show was cancelled after 13 episodes due to low viewing figures.

In 2013, Tsamere joined the team of beIN Sports' programme Lunch Time, which was hosted by Darren Tulett. In February 2014, it was announced that Tsamere would host the TMC game show Canapé Quiz, an adaptation of the American Hollywood Game Night. The show featured two teams, each composed of three celebrities and one member of the public, competing in a series of games. Three weeks later, TMC announced that Canapé Quiz had been cancelled and new episodes were to be moved to a later timeslot because of low viewing figures—10 days after its launch, it failed to pass 100,000 viewers. Discussing the show's audience in an interview on Europe 1, Tsamere stated that he did not care about the viewing figures, and also mentioned that he had received positive feedback about the show on Twitter, which he called "quite a revealing thing". (Note: Original: un truc assez révélateur) He also stressed that he has fun when filming Canapé Quiz. From 13 July 2015, Tsamere will present the game show Une famille en or (the French version of Family Feud and Family Fortunes) when it returns on TMC; it was previously presented by Christophe Dechavanne from 2007 to 2014 on TF1. Tsamere said "It's the challenge of taking the reins of a cult programme that interested me". (Note: Original: C'est le challenge de prendre les rênes d'une émission culte qui m'a intéressé)

He has also appeared on various game shows, including Mot de passe and Fort Boyard (French versions of Million Dollar Password and The Crystal Maze respectively), as well as the chat show La nuit nous appartient on NRJ 12. In 2012, he performed on Rire & Chansons, a comedy and musical radio station.

=== Film ===
In 2011, Tsamere's first film role was Séverin in Charles Nemes' Au bistro du coin. In the same year, he appeared in Pascale Pouzadoux's La Croisière, and in the short films Le Métro (directed by Dianeïa Schaefer) and Deal (Wilfried Méance). Tsamere played the character of Vincent in Arnaud Demanche's short film Being Homer Simpson, in which he appeared alongside Philippe Peythieu and Véronique Augereau, the voice actors of Homer and Marge respectively in the French dub of the animated series The Simpsons. He also starred alongside José Garcia in Fonzy, a remake of the film Starbuck, in which he plays Maître Chasseigne. It was released on 30 October 2013.

=== Sports journalism ===
Tsamere has written several columns about sport for the newspaper Le Monde, on topics such as golfer Tiger Woods, the cyclists Chris Froome and Lance Armstrong in the Tour de France, and the French football league Ligue 1. In July 2015, an article he wrote entitled "And then along came Sky and ruined everything", (Note: Original: Et puis Sky vint tout gâcher) which accused Froome of doping, was cited by BBC News's Paris correspondent Hugh Schofield as an example of the hostility of the French press towards the cyclist.

== Style and influences ==
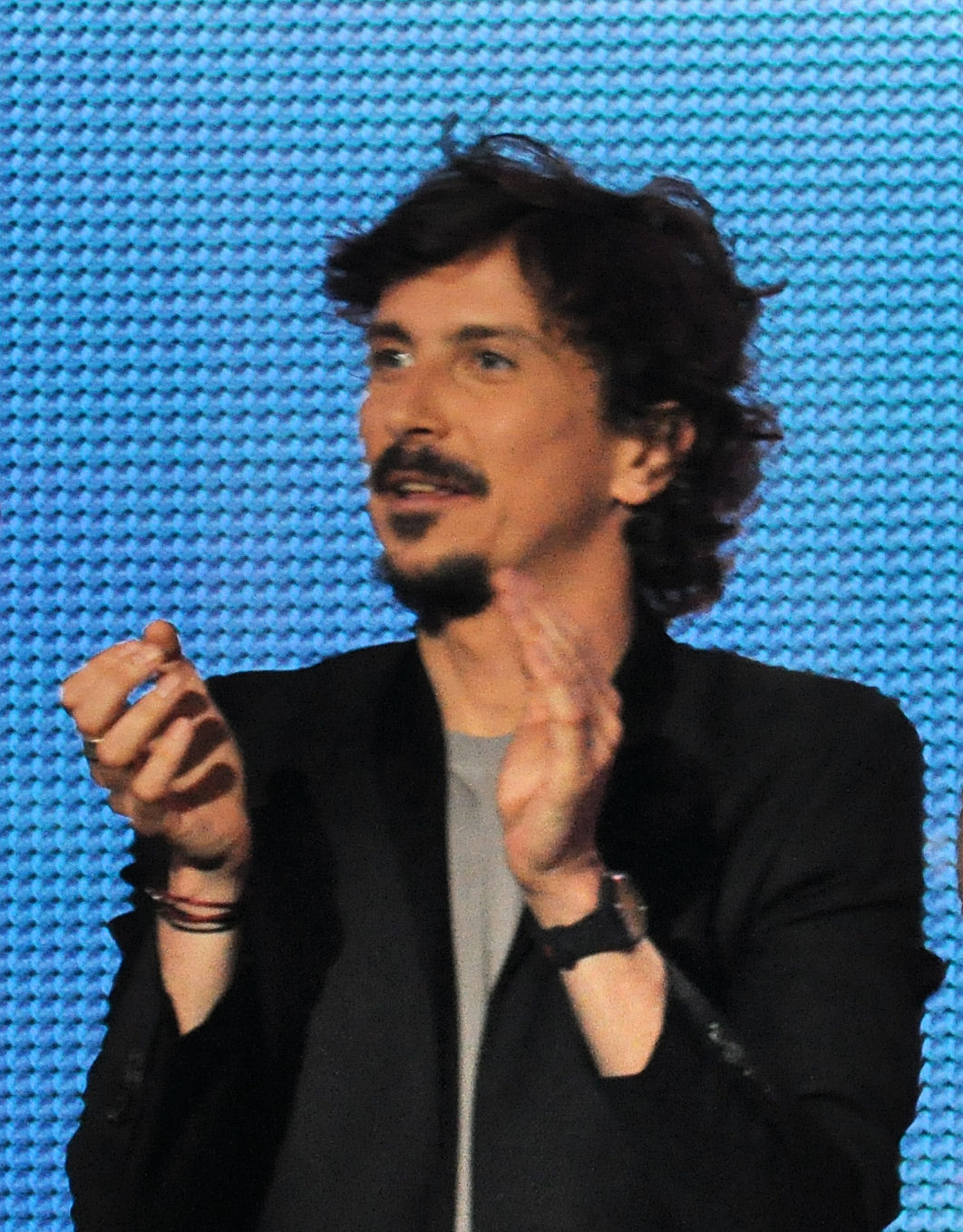
Tsamere at the Casino de Paris in June 2013

Tsamere's style can be described as absurd humour, which according to him "has no hold on current events, politics or religion". (Note: Original: n'a pas de prise, ni sur l'actualité, ni sur la politique, ni sur la religion) He is a specialist in improvisation. He is known for his "slow burn" technique (a term coined by On n'demande qu'à en rire jury member Jean-Luc Moreau), in which he talks about a subject before moving on to another and repeatedly interrupting himself to return to the initial subject. His humour is popular with television audiences, and has boosted On n'demande qu'à en rire's viewing figures.

On his website, Tsamere provides a link to that of François Rollin, as well as to that of English comedian Ricky Gervais, whom he calls "my absolute master". (Note: Original: mon maître absolu) Other role models of his are the brothers Simon and Alexandre Astier—he says of them and Gervais that he "could watch them perform anything". (Note: Original: je pourrais les voir jouer n'importe quoi) He has stated that his favourite director is Tim Burton, linking this to his surreal style.

== Personal life ==
Tsamere's partner was the racing driver and television presenter Margot Laffite (daughter of Jacques Laffite); their first child was born on 4 February 2015. They divorced in 2017.

Tsamere is a cycling enthusiast and a fan of association football; he called the latter "My first great love to which I have remained faithful for so many years". (Note: Original: Mon premier grand amour auquel je reste fidèle depuis tant d’années.) He is a user of Twitter and describes himself as "a bit of a geek", but says that he never retweets fans. He uses an iPad, which he says has allowed him to read more: he "love[s] new technology like a kid". (Note: Original: j'aime les nouvelles technologies comme un gamin) Tsamere quit smoking in June 2012, saying that tobacco "disgusted" him; (Note: Original: dégoûtait) he uses an electronic cigarette.

He enjoys romantic comedy films, of which his favourites are Pretty Woman and Notting Hill. Tsamere's favourite television programme is the Belgian documentary series Strip-Tease, and he describes himself as "a real TV addict". (Note: Original: un vrai téléphage) He also likes Grey's Anatomy, and Hero Corp, in which he appears—he says he is "not ashamed" (Note: Original: Je n'ai pas honte) to watch himself. He has read Une Vie by Guy de Maupassant, which he described as "so beautiful", (Note: Original: tellement beau) and the biography of Apple Inc. founder Steve Jobs, which he said is "the story of an incredible life". (Note: Original: le récrit d'une vie incroyable)

== Credits ==
=== Film ===
Year	Title	Role	Notes
2011	Au bistro du coin	Séverin	First film role
2011	La croisière	Colleague of Alix	
2013	Fonzy	Maître Chasseigne	

=== Short films ===
Year	Title	Role
2011	Le Métro	Homeless man
2011	Deal	The judge
2013	Being Homer Simpson	Vincent

=== Television ===
Year	Title	Role	Notes
2007	Enquete d'humour	Inspector Tobby	
2008	Off Prime	Audio engineer	
2008–	Hero Corp	Captain Sport Extrême	
2010	Caméra Café 2	Xavier Piaget	
2011	United colors of Jean-Luc	Fabrice	
2012	Palmashow: Lost in Montreux		
2012	Palmashow: Very Bad Blagues	D'Artagnan	Episode 74: "Quand on est Mousquetaires"
2012	Le Psymmo		
2013	Palmashow l'émission		Episode: "Quand on fait un braquage"
2013	What Ze Teuf		Episode 13 (on D8)

==== Non-fictional appearances ====
- 2005: Le Grand Journal on Canal+ (weather presenter)
- 2005: SAV des émissions on Canal+
- 2006: La longue nuit du pénis on Canal+
- 2007: Made In Palmade on France 3
- 2008: Pliés en 4 on France 4
- 2010–2013: On n'demande qu'a en rire on France 2
- 2011: On a tout révisé on France 2
- 2011: On n'est pas couché on France 2 (in a duo with Jérémy Ferrari)
- 2011: Mot de passe on France 2
- 2011: Dance Street on France Ô
- 2012: Turbo on M6
- 2012: Morandini! (with Lamine Lezghad, Kheiron and Verino)
- 2012: Le Golden Show (episode 5)
- 2012: Le News Show on Canal+
- 2012: Fort Boyard on France 2
- 2012: Paris tout compris on France 3
- 2012: C à vous on France 5
- 2012: On n'est pas des pigeons on RTBF
- 2012: V6 on AB1
- 2012–2013: ONDAR Show on France 2 (presenter)
- 2012: La nuit nous appartient on NRJ 12 (with Jérémy Ferrari)
- 2013: Lunch Time on beIN Sport
- 2013: Vendredi, tout est permis avec Arthur on TF1
- 2013: Le plus grand cabaret du monde on France 2
- 2013: Les années bonheur on France 2
- 2013: Comment ça va bien ! on France 2
- 2013: L'équipe du soir on L'Équipe 21
- 2014: Canapé Quiz on TMC (presenter)
- 2015: Une famille en or on TMC (presenter)

=== Radio ===
- 2011–: On va s'gêner on Europe 1 (regular commentator)
- 2012: Rire & Chansons

=== Theatre ===
Year	Title	Role	Notes
2002–2004	Réflexions profondes sur pas mal de trucs		Written with Arnaud Joyet
2003–2004	Cyrano de Bergerac	Count of Guiche	Adaptation, with La Pastière
2005	Cyrano de Bergerac	Christian de Neuvillette	Adaptation, with La Pastière
2005	La Folle de Chaillot		
2007–2014	Chose Promise	Patrice Valenton	Written with Arnaud Joyet and François Rollin
2008–2010	Monique est demandée caisse 12	Piotr	
2008–2009	Le Comique	Arnaud Pelletier	
2012	Métamère en impro		With Éric Métayer
2012–2014	La tournée du trio		With Jérémy Ferrari and Baptiste Lecaplain
2014–	Confidences sur pas mal de trucs plus ou moins confidentiels		Written with Arnaud Joyet and François Rollin
