= Chose Promise =

Play

- The show's poster shows Patrice Valenton holding a photograph of Rémi.
- Written by: François Rollin; Arnaud Joyet; Arnaud Tsamere
- Characters: Patrice Valenton
- Original language: French
- Subject: Promises, death
- Genre: Surreal comedy; Character comedy

Premiere
- Date premiered: 2007
- Official website

Chose Promise (French: [ʃoz pʁɔmiz]; Promised Thing) is a one-man show performed by the French comedian Arnaud Tsamere from 2007 to 2014. Written by Tsamere, François Rollin and Arnaud Joyet, it features the character Patrice Valenton, a teacher who is performing a comedy show because of a promise he made to his friend Rémi, who died in a car accident. After explaining this, he attempts ventriloquism, shadow puppetry, a vaudeville play and a song about Rémi. Tsamere then comes out of character and does a routine about bulbs around mirrors in dressing rooms.

The show's title comes from the expression chose promise, chose due ("a promise is a promise") and it deals with the theme of death; the character of a teacher was chosen to depict failure. Chose Promise was released on DVD on 6 March 2013 after being recorded at the Sébastopol Theatre in Lille, and its final performances were at the Olympia in February 2014—it has been broadcast on the television channels Comédie+ and D17. It was well received by critics, who praised Tsamere's performance, particularly in the vaudeville sequence.

== Synopsis ==
This summary is based on the DVD version of the show.

Patrice Valenton (Arnaud Tsamere) introduces himself as an economics teacher at the University Institute of Technology in Vincennes. He explains that he is there to honour a promise he made to his best friend Rémi, who was hospitalised by a car accident. Patrice arrived to see Rémi on his deathbed, and Rémi asked Patrice to perform a one-man show on his behalf. Patrice answered "I promise...", and Rémi died, not knowing that the end of the sentence was "...that you'll get better" and that Patrice did not want to perform. Patrice explains that he will keep his promise because becoming a comedian was Rémi's dream, but that he is not a comedian and is not there to get laughs or applause.

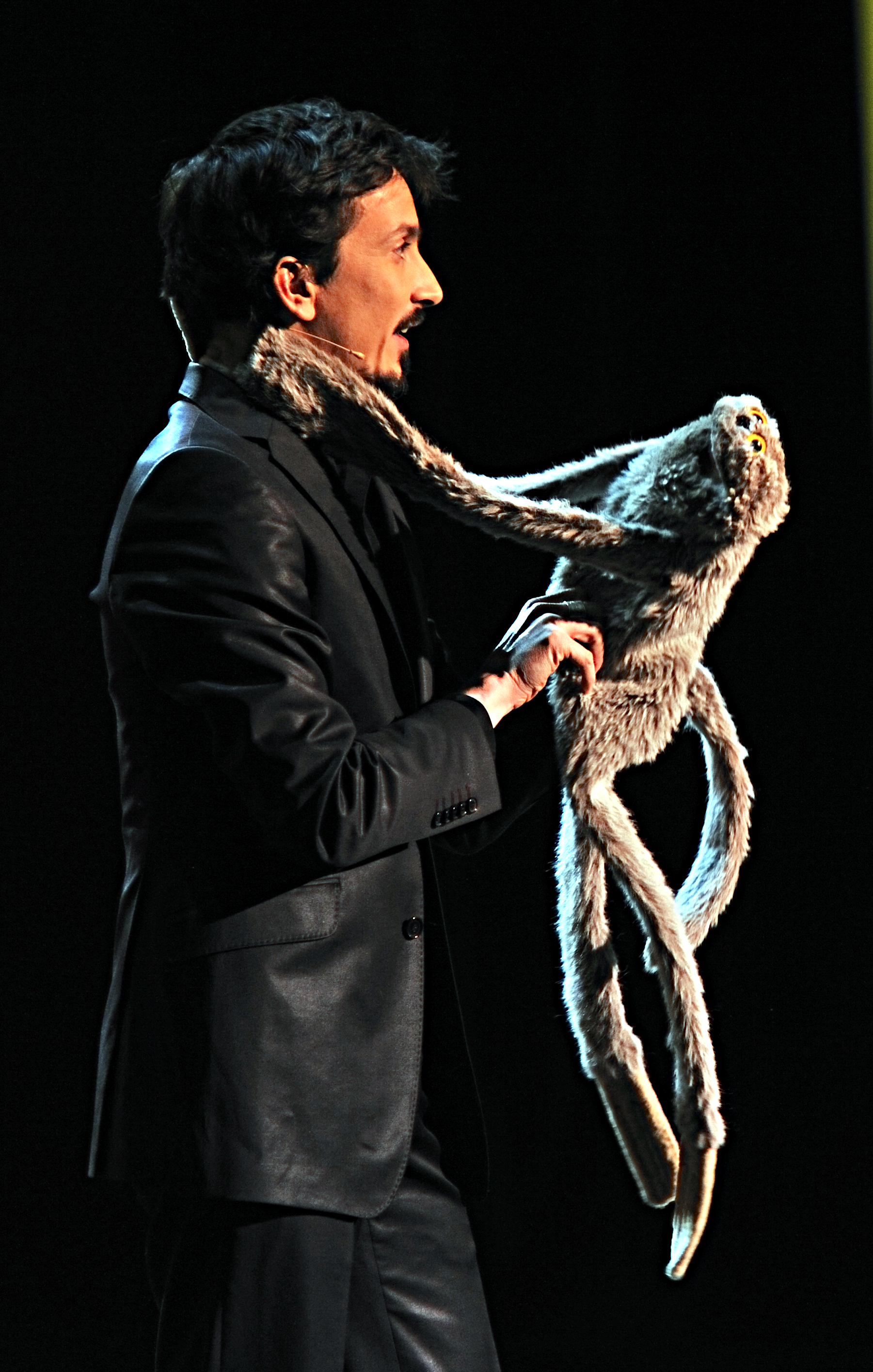
Tsamere holding his puppet Falzouille

Patrice begins the show, explaining that he will use memories and objects relating to Rémi to perform. He says that Rémi loved ventriloquism, and performs his own routine with a monkey puppet called Falzouille, in which the puppet never speaks. He talks about how the puppet is not alive as it has Velcro pads, and imitates a cat and mouse with Velcro on their paws. He tells a story of when he removed the batteries from his colleague's calculator, then takes out Rémi's notebook, which contains the telephone numbers of prostitutes and vomit stains. Patrice performs a shadow puppetry routine in which an Armenian soldier rescues his daughter from 25 duduk players. It becomes clear that Patrice is not actually making the shadows, and he gets annoyed at three stagehands called David.

Patrice decides to perform the final scene of a vaudeville play he has written called La Pendule (The Clock). He explains the complex plot and characters: set in 1929 in a townhouse in Provence, the play involves the Duke of Ponfouy and his family, associates and household servants. He performs the scene, playing all the characters himself and exaggerating their voices and mannerisms. For Patrice's final act, he plays a recording of Rémi and himself from 1985, then sings a song he has written about Rémi and the accident. When the audience applauds the song, he criticises them as he does not want to be a famous comedian. After imitating a marionette, he performs his curtain call with a toy dragon; he dances with it and a sparkler, and flaps its wings to Johann Strauss I's Radetzky March.

Radetzky March

Tsamere comes out of character, thanks the audience, writers and producers of the show, and explains that the preceding story is a fiction. He talks about his stage fright and goes off on a tangent about the bulbs around mirrors in dressing rooms; he asks a row of the audience to stand repeatedly to check whether pillars in the theatre are load-bearing. He ends by saying that he does not need the mirror, as he does not wear make-up.

== Background and themes ==
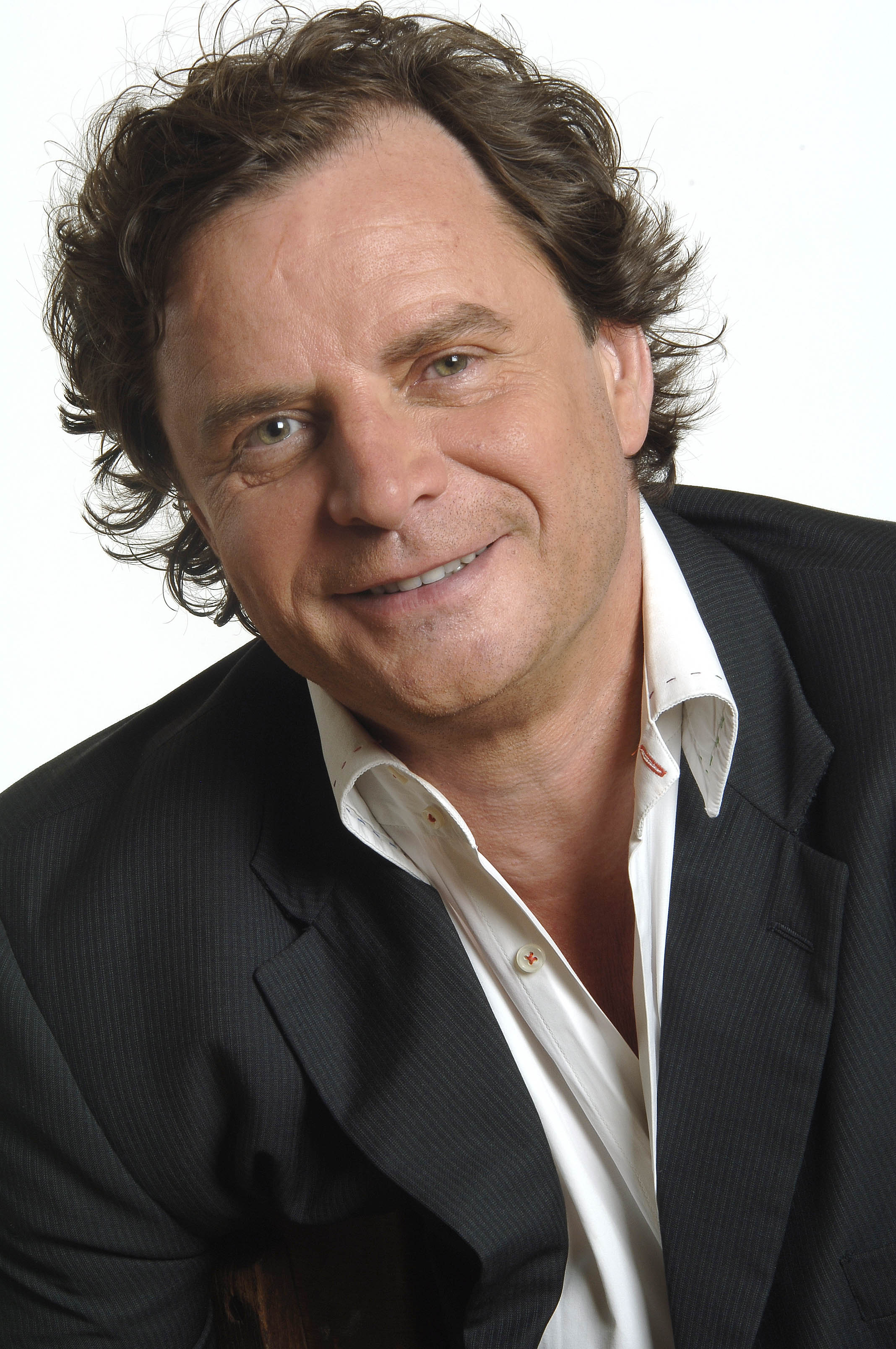
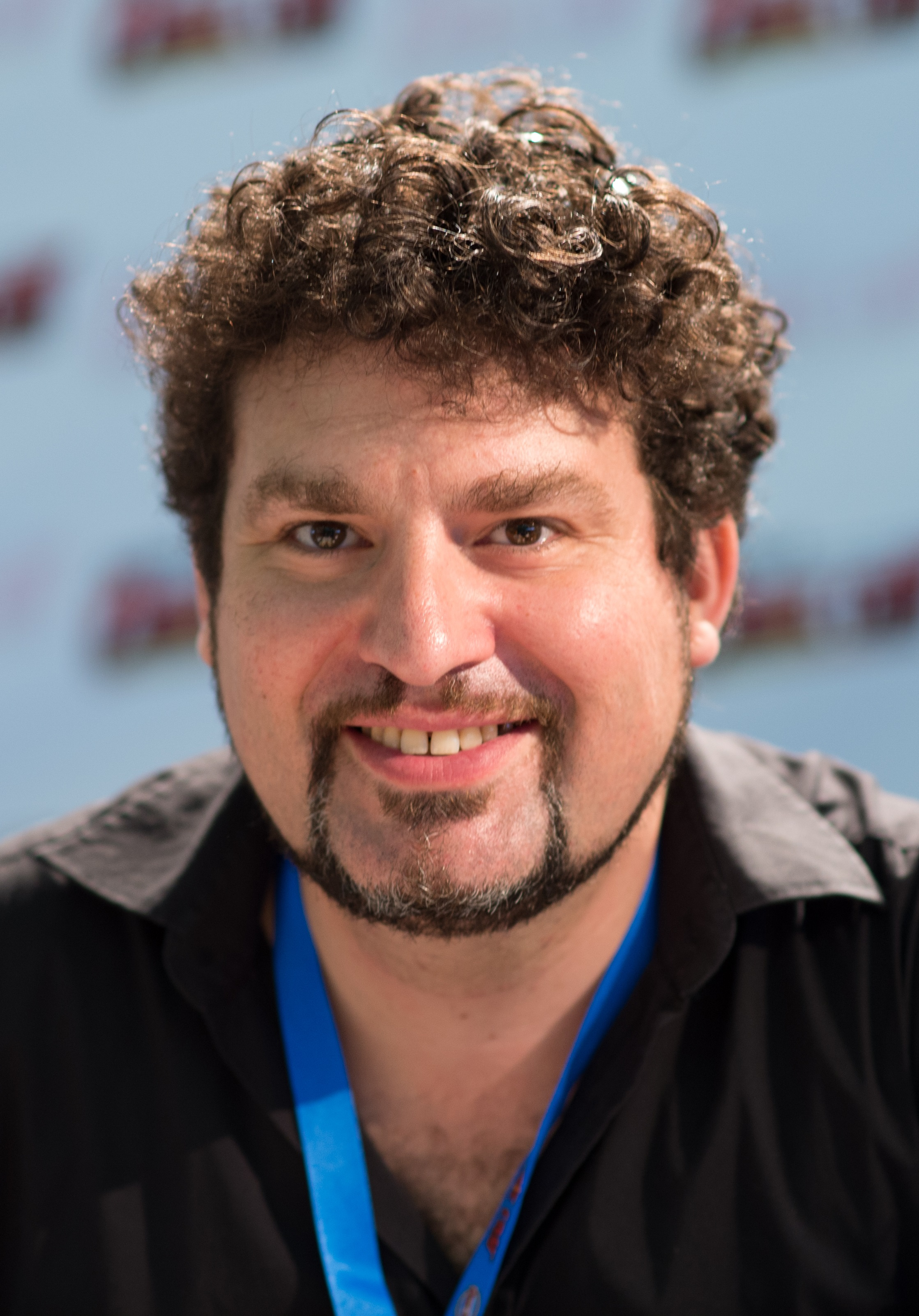
Chose Promise was co-written with François Rollin and Arnaud Joyet.

The French expression chose promise, chose due, which is the equivalent of "a promise is a promise" in English, and to which Chose Promise responds, dates from the 17th century. After his first show Réflexions profondes sur pas mal de trucs (Profound reflections on quite a few things), written with Arnaud Joyet and inspired by a videotape of François Rollin, Tsamere met Rollin at the Dinard Comedy Festival. He joined Tsamere and Joyet to write a new show. Rollin had seen his previous show, which played on theatrical "flops", and told Tsamere that he could not perform this humour as himself without showing at the end that he could really do ventriloquism and play the guitar, which he could not. Therefore, the character of a teacher was created to play on failure.

Tsamere has described Valenton's profession as "not far from the style of what I am, [but] very far in substance"; (Note: Original: pas très éloigné dans le forme de ce je suis; par contre, dans le fond il est très éloigné) he said of the character: "Under his generous side as a friend who is keeping his promise ... we have a guy who is ... in the end quite megalomaniacal." (Note: Original: Sous son côté généreux et ami qui tient sa promesse ... on a un mec qui est ... finalement assez mégalo) The show deals with the theme of death, which Tsamere said is "a bit strange, but it has the virtue of attracting the public's attention". (Note: Original: c'est un petit peu bizarre mais ça a le mérite d'attirer l'attention du public) He said that he and his co-authors thought that "the most irrefutable reason to go on stage ... was to talk about something strong". (Note: Original: la raison la plus imparable pour monter sur scène ... c'était de parler de quelque chose de fort) Tsamere has described how the show changed as the size of its audiences grew and he incorporated improvisations.

== Performances ==
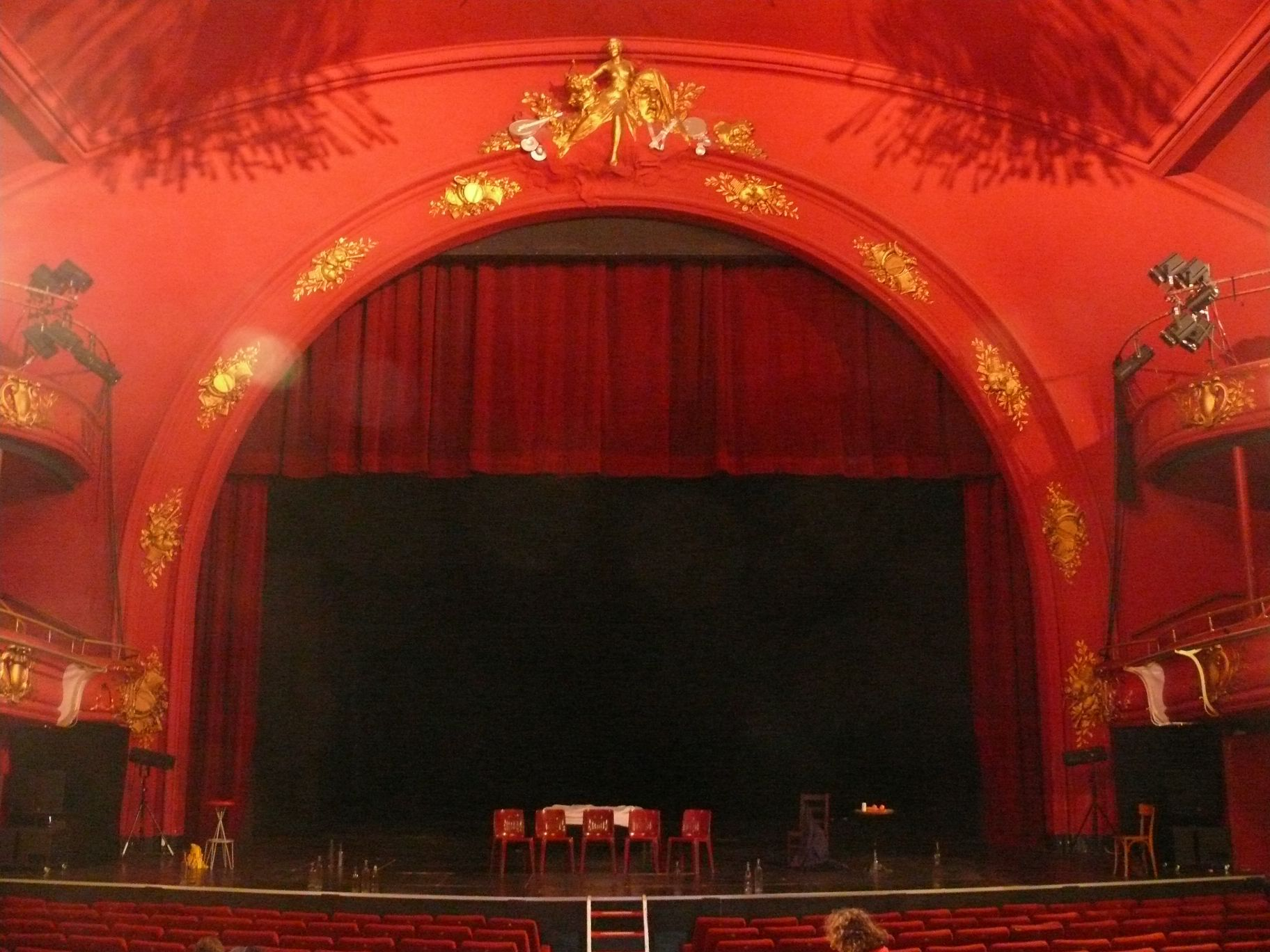
The inside of the Sébastopol Theatre in Lille, where the DVD version of the show was recorded

Chose Promise was produced by 20h40 Productions and Troyes dans l'Aube Prod and directed by Rollin and Joyet. It was written in 2007, and has been performed at the Européen theatre and the Casino de Paris; Tsamere has done three tours of the show. In early 2014, the show was performed in Tours, Strasbourg, Lille, Petite-Forêt, Rennes, Bourg-les-Valence, Voiron, Annecy and Chalon-sur-Saône in France, as well as in Geneva and Montreux in Switzerland. The two final performances took place at the Olympia in February 2014.

After it was recorded at the Sébastopol Theatre in Lille on 5 October 2012, the show was released on DVD, Blu-ray and video on demand on 6 March 2013; it includes a commentary track by Rollin and Joyet, and a making-of documentary called La boucle est bouclée ("We've come full circle") filmed by Simon Astier, who followed Tsamere around with a camera on the day of the recording. Tsamere said he chose Lille for the recording because he has a "special relationship" (Note: Original: rapport particulier) with the place. On 23 September 2013, the show was broadcast on the television channel Comédie+—it was later shown on D17 on 31 August 2014, when it was seen by 254,000 people (a 1.1% audience share).

== Reception ==
Pariscope's Julien Barret praised Tsamere's "unbridled imagination [and] oratorical ease", (Note: Original: imagination débridée, aisance oratoire) and called his vaudeville performance "exceptional"; (Note: Original: exceptionnelle) Marie-Céline Nivière, of the same publication, said "[Tsamere's] talents as an actor are remarkable" (Note: Original: ses talents de comédien sont remarquables) and also praised the vaudeville act. Michèle Bourcet of Télérama called it "an acting performance with mastered folly" (Note: Original: Une performance d'acteur à la folie maîtrisée) and rated it "TT", meaning "We like it a lot". (Note: Original: On aime beaucoup) Le Parisien described "the meticulous writing, the absurd universe and the hilarious digressions" (Note: Original: l'écriture soignée, l'univers absurde et les hilarantes digressions) of Chose Promise, calling it a "masterpiece of the genre". (Note: Original: chef-d'œuvre du genre) Le Figaro's Nathalie Simon wrote of Tsamere's "bubbly disposition [and] tremendous energy", (Note: Original: tempérament bouillonnant, de l'énergie à revendre) noting that his appearances on On n'demande qu'à en rire "have brought him an audience of appreciative fans whatever he does". (Note: Original: lui ont apporté un public de fans conquis quoi qu'il fasse)
