= Cendrillon au Far West =

2012 French film directed by Pascal Hérold

- Film poster
- Directed by: Pascal Hérold
- Written by: Pascal Hérold
- Produced by: Jeremy Burdek; Serge de Poucques; Sylvain Goldberg; Pascal Hérold; Nadia Khamlichi; Adrian Politowski; Gilles Waterkeyn
- Starring: Alexandra Lamy; Antoine de Caunes; Yolande Moreau
- Edited by: ZARAGRAF
- Music by: Phil Brewster
- Production companies: Delacave Studios; Nexus Factory uFilm
- Distributed by: BAC Films
- Release date: 25 July 2012
- Running time: 81 minutes
- Countries: France; Belgium
- Language: French
- Budget: $13 million
- Box office: $520,000

Cendrillon au Far West (French for "Cinderella in the Far West") is a 2012 animated Western comedy film directed and written by Pascal Hérold and produced by Delacave Studios, Nexus Factory and uFilm.

In English-speaking media, this movie is entitled Cinderella: Once Upon a Time in The West.

== Plot ==
In the small Western town of Felicity City, Cinderella the deer is working for her pug stepmother, Felicity, while complaining about men's lack of manners. A train arrives with the classy Cocker Spaniel prince, Vladmir, and the cheeky turkey duchess.

Felicity throws a ball in the local saloon to celebrate the coming of royalty, while plotting to get one of her two daughters married to the prince. Cinderella has become infatuated with the prince, and laments that she can't attend, as Felicity kept all attractive females out of the ball.

A porcupine shaman sees Cinderella and helps her get into the ball by casting a spell that gives her a mask, make up, and a dress that will wear out at midnight. Cinderella, now disguised, forces her way into the ball and catches the prince's eye immediately. They begin to dance while the Prince's mother and Cinderella's stepmother enjoy a game of poker in a backroom. Felicity hustles the queen of all her earnings by pretending to not know how to play well, and eventually convinces her to bet her son's hand in marriage. By cheating she wins and the queen feels bad for what she did.

The ball is attacked by a group of gorilla bandits seeking to capture the queen and prince. They manage to capture the queen, but the prince evades capture because Cinderella fights to protect him, losing a tooth in the process. Cinderella's spell wears off, and the prince is knocked out by Felicity, who is determined to give him to one of her daughters.

The next morning, the prince manages to escape Felicity's goons by putting them to sleep by playing a violin. He runs into Cinderella, not recognizing her, and the shaman. He resolves to rescue his mother and find the woman who he danced with the night before, with only her tooth to go by. Cinderella and the shaman go with him to help him find his mother. As they go, Felicity gets her daughters and goons and hunts after them.

The outlaws take the queen back to their hideout, a ship in the middle of quicksand, and politely threaten her to sign a will that would give their leader her inheritance. She takes advantage of the polite nature of the leader and bides her time while her son and Cinderella run from Felicity and track the outlaws. During their journey, the prince eventually realizes that Cinderella is that mystery woman from the ball.

As Felicity catches up to Cinderella and crew, she pulls out a gun and tries to shoot Cinderella. The prince and shaman trick them into falling off a cliff. They find themselves in a forest dense with bizarre flora, where the bandits find them and begin to ride vultures to chase them. Ultimately they find the bandit hideout and Cinderella is captured by the bandits, while the shaman is left to die.

The bandit leader, Jefe, threatens to kill the duchess' son if she doesn't sign a contract. The threat is interrupted by Felicity and her goons shooting cannonballs at their ship, ultimately causing it to begin sinking. The bandits, frightened, begin to abandon ship while the prince fights the leader. The fight is cut short when Felicity and her goons and daughters arrive and hold the captain at gunpoint to marry herself and the prince.

Cinderella lights a cannon that was stuck to the captain's leg and it fires him off into the distance. The damage from the cannon fire begins to cause the ship to break into pieces and sink. Cinderella, the duchess, and the prince, make their way to one end of the ship. Felicity is stuck on a part that's sinking faster, Cinderella offers her hand to help, but Felicity refuses, and dies. The shaman appears at the last moment with vultures and saves the three protagonists. Cinderella and the prince leave the town via train, presumably to marry and live at the prince's home country.

== Cast ==
- Alexandra Lamy as Cinderella
- Antoine de Caunes as Prince Vladmir
- Yolande Moreau as Felicity
- Michel Boujenah as Petite Fumée
- Isabelle Nanty as The Grand Duchess
- Philippe Peythieu as Barbazul
- Véronique Augereau as Harmony
- Audrey Lamy as Melody
- Hervé Lassïnce as Dark Lopez
- Jessica Gee as Felicity
- Grant George as Bandits
- Joe Thomas as Little Cloud
