= Georges Perrier =

French chef (born 1943)

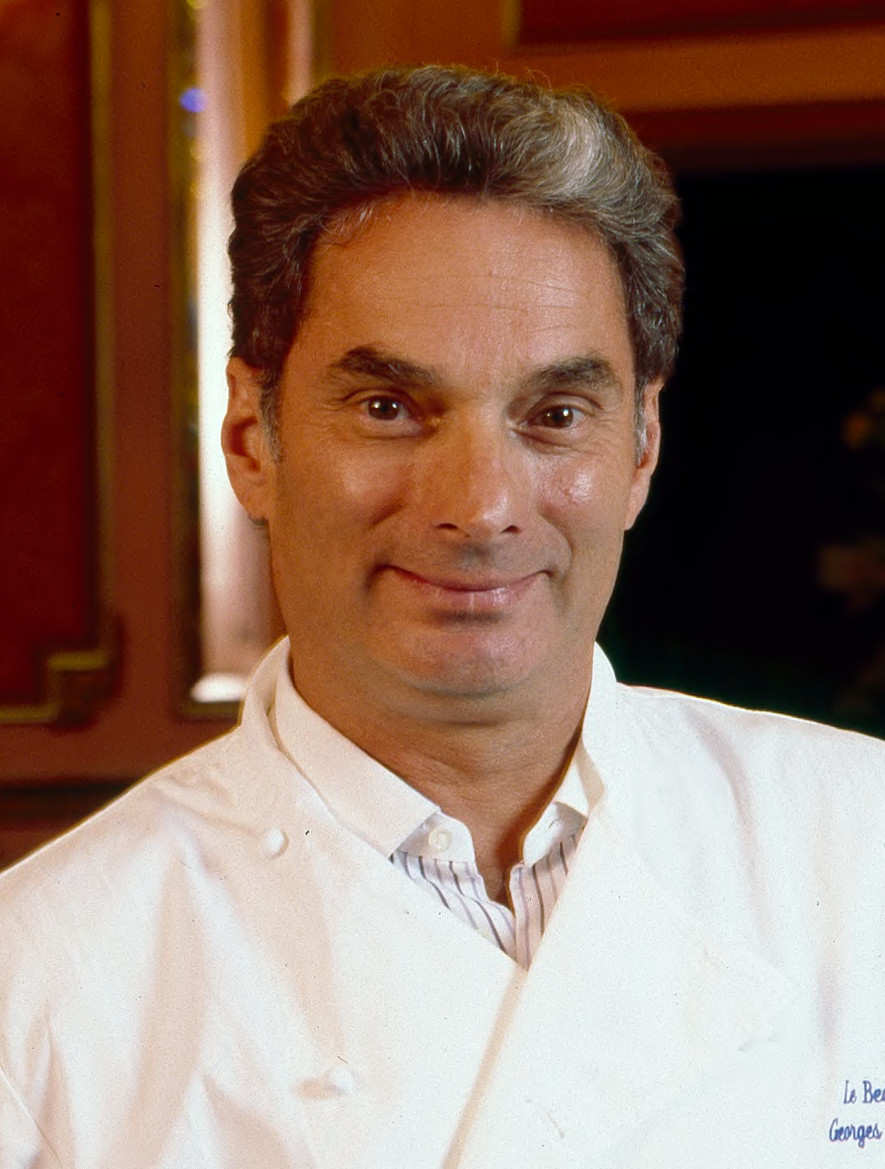
- Georges Perrier photographed in the 1990s by Carol M. Highsmith.
- Pronunciation: /dʒɔːdʒˈpɛri.eɪ/
- Born: December 10, 1943 (age 82); Lyon, France
- Occupations: Chef, businessman
- Style: French cuisine

Georges Perrier (born 1943) is a French chef who emigrated to the United States in 1967 and lived in Philadelphia, where he founded and ran Le Bec-Fin and other restaurants, bars and cafés across the country.

== Early life ==
At age 12, Perrier created his first entrée, "Sweetbreads with Mushrooms and Madeira", and after this experience, he decided on his career which he began two years later at age 14. He trained with chefs at various restaurants of France, including Michel Lorrain of Casino de Charbonnières near Lyon, Jacques Picard of L’Oustau de Baumanière in Provence, and Guy Thivard in Vienne, owned by Fernand Point.

== Le Bec-Fin ==
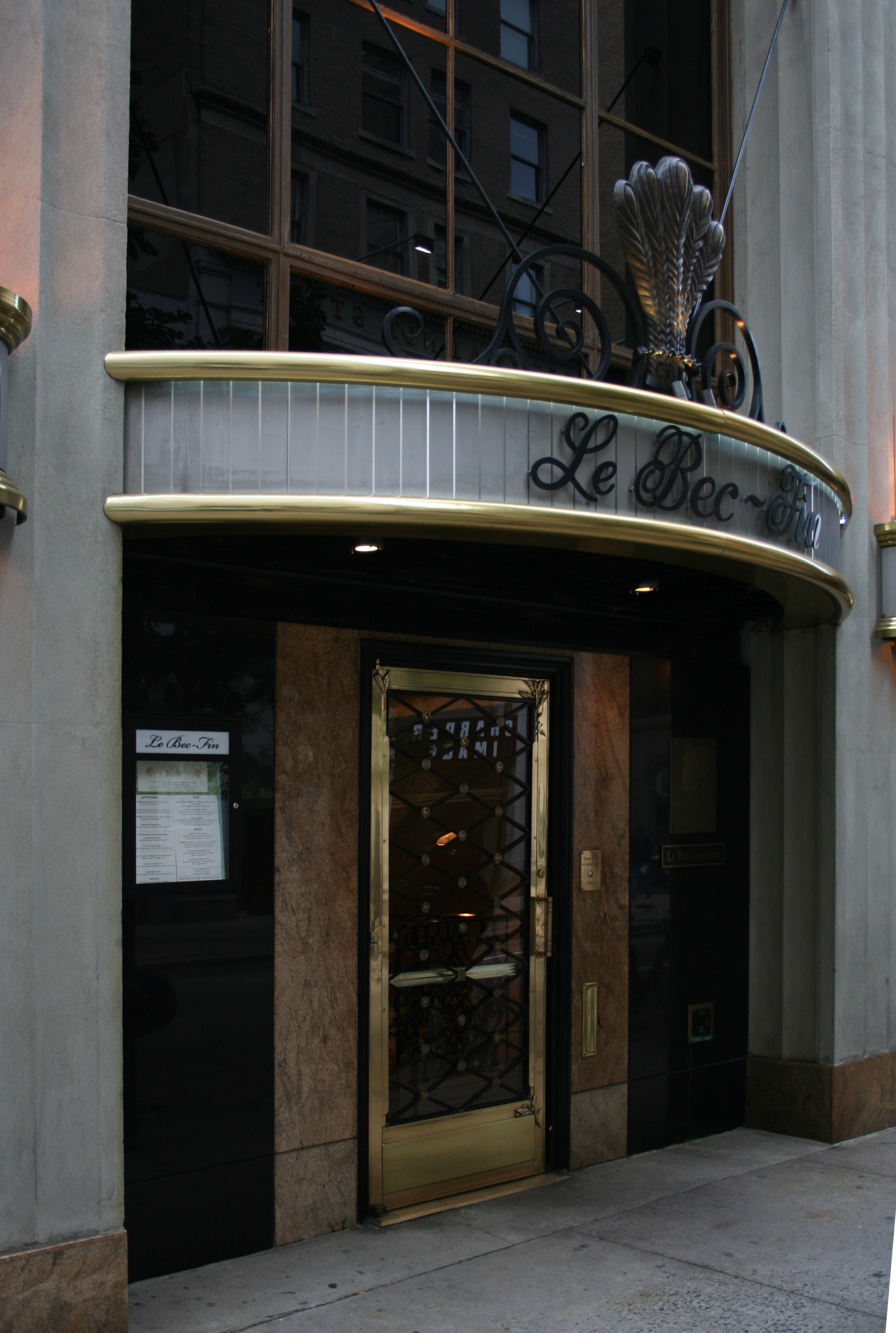

Perrier immigrated in the United States of America in November 1967 as Head Chef of Peter von Starck's La Panetiere. In 1970, he opened Le Bec-Fin, a French seafood-specialised restaurant. Originally on 1312 Spruce St., it moved to Walnut Street in 1983. Le Bec-Fin was awarded as one of the best restaurant in the United States. It has received a total of 10 James Beard Foundation Awards between 1992 and 2002. The restaurant has been rated Five-Stars by the Mobil Travel Guide for over 20 years and Five-Diamond status with the American Automobile Association (AAA) since 1989. For three consecutive years, readers of Gourmet magazine have selected the restaurant as their #1 choice in Philadelphia. In 1994, Le Bec-Fin was named the #1 restaurant in the country by readers of Conde Nast Traveler magazine. Zagat survey continually lists Le Bec-Fin as Philadelphia's favorite restaurant and gives it the highest score of any restaurant in the country since 1993.

At Le Bec-Fin, Georges Perrier perfected seafood based recipes such as the galette de crabe, a French riff on an American crab cake that he developed after a trip to Maryland’s Eastern Shore. After 43 years, the restaurant closed on June 15, 2013.

== Brasserie Perrier ==
Opened in 1997 on Walnut Street, Philadelphia, the Brasserie Perrier was Georges' second restaurant. It was a casual and contemporary sibling to his haute-cuisine jewel, Le Bec-Fin. The brasserie closed in 2009 due to a rent increase.

== Bistro Perrier ==
Chef Georges Perrier became master-in-residence at The Restaurant School at Walnut Hill College in 2017, and he began his role at "Le Bec-Fin Redux," a one-night-only reprisal of his menu in the restaurant that would later become Bistro Perrier.

Georges Perrier helped guide the careers of student chefs at Walnut Hill College. He taught, hosted special dinners, and led workshops for professional chefs on the WHC campus.

== Television & Cinema ==
- In 1994 TV Show – "Great Chefs of the East series and their Great Chefs" – Great Cities television series – Discovery Channel
- In 1995 TV Show - "The Late Show with David Letterman" - Episode 140
- In 2001 TV Documentary – "Strip Tease: Les Caprices du Chef" by Anne-Marie Avouac 34:43
- In 2004 June 20: TV Documentary – "Strip-tease: America America 1 : Amour, gloire et santé" by Anne-Marie Avouac 56:53
- In 2004 June 27: TV Documentary – "Strip Tease: America America 2 : Un monde presque parfait" by Anne-Marie Avouac 59:34
- In 2004 July 4: TV Documentary – "Strip Tease: America America 3 : Mon frère s’appelle Raymond" by Anne-Marie Avouac 56:15
- In 2004 July 11: TV Documentary – "Strip Tease: America America 4 : Le mariage de Cendrillon" by Anne-Marie Avouac 56:58
- In 2012 July 16: TV Documentary – "Strip Tease: America America 5 : La princesse aux pieds nus" 50:00
- In 2012 July 23: TV Documentary – "Strip Tease: America America 6 : Et Dieu dans tout ça ?" 50:00
- In 2015 "King Georges", movie which premiered in April. By Erika Frankel

== Achievements ==
- In 1981, at the age of 38, Chef Perrier was admitted to the Maitres Cuisiniers de France.
- In 1983, Georges Perrier moved to what will be the 5 stars award winning Le Bec-Fin restaurant on Walnut Street.
- In 1989, Maitres Cuisiner de France voted Perrier "Chef of the Year" and awarded him the Silver Toque, the most coveted trophy in the world of haute cuisine.
- In 1994, readers of Condé Nast Traveler magazine chose Le Bec-Fin as the No. 1 restaurant in the United States of America.
- In 1997, Chef Perrier's first book, Georges Perrier Le Bec-Fin Recipes, was published and contains more than 100 recipes.
- In 1998, Chef Perrier was honored by America's leading culinary organization when he was awarded Best Mid-Atlantic Chef by the James Beard Foundation.
- In 2009, the French government awarded Perrier in January the Legion d'Honneur.
- In 2010, Chef Perrier received the Academiciens de l’Annee, the high honor presented by the Academie Culinaire de France.
- In 2012, he received the "Medaille de la ville de Roanne" from the town Mayor Ms. Laure Deroche.
