= Baptiste Lecaplain =

French comedian and actor (born 1985)

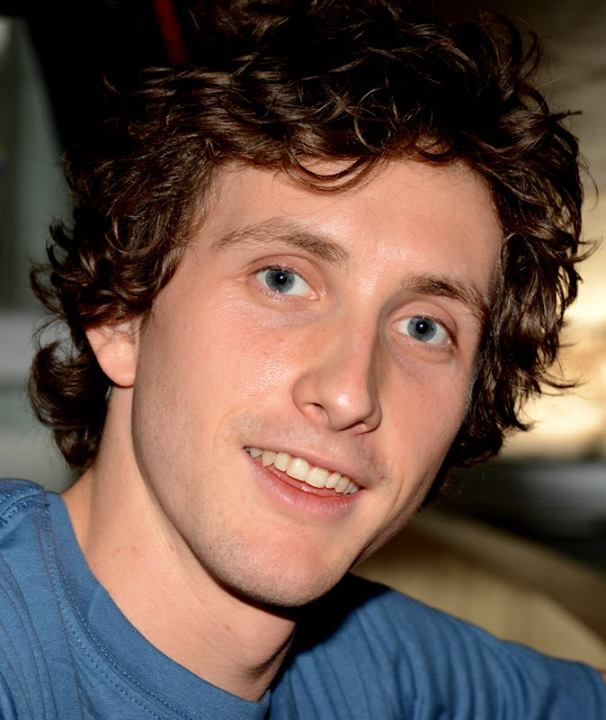
- Lecaplain in June 2013
- Born: 23 May 1985 (age 40); Mortain, Manche, Normandy, France
- Occupation: Comedian
- Website: baptiste-lecaplain.fr

Baptiste Lecaplain (born 23 May 1985 in Mortain) is a French comedian and actor. He does stand-up comedy and has appeared in some films.

== Early life ==
In 2004, he got his baccalauréat. After that, he was a youth leader at Levallois-Perret but he quit that job in 2006 in order to become a comedian.

== Career ==
In 2008, he started touring with his show Baptiste se tape l'affiche, which is mostly autobiographical. From January to February 2013, he did a break in order to tour with Jérémy Ferrari and Arnaud Tsamere for La Tournée du Trio in all French Zéniths. After that he continued touring for his own show which ended in 2014.

In 2012, he was part of Fidèles au poste !, as well as the movie Nous York.

In 2013, he was amongst the celebrities who appeared in a TV special of French TV Serie Scènes de ménages.

In 2014, he played the main role of French movie Libre et assoupi, alongside Charlotte Le Bon and Félix Moati. He starred in a short film by Rémi Bezançon for the French road traffic safety. In October, he joined Les Grosses Têtes.

In 2015, he started a new tour with a show called Origines.

== Filmography ==
=== Films ===
Year	Title	Role	Notes
2012	Nous York	Sylvain	
2012	Grand Garçon	Jo	
2014	Libre et assoupi	Sébastien	
2014	Asterix: The Land of the Gods	A gladiator	Voice
2014	Le Sourire du pompier	Jules	Short film
2014	High Society	Kevin	
2014	La Couille	Laurent	Short film
2015	Les Dissociés	Pauline's boyfriend	
2016	Dieumerci !	Clément	
2016	La folle histoire de Max et Léon	A soldier	

=== Television ===
Year	Title	Role	Notes
2011	Bref	Baptiste	TV Serie
2012	Very Bad Blagues	Himself	2 sketches
2012	Strictement platonique	Hugo Belasta	TV Serie
2013	Scènes de ménages		TV Serie
2013	Hero Corp		TV Serie
2013	Enfin te voilà !		TV Serie
2013	What Ze Teuf		TV Serie
2014	Les Tutos	Himself	TV Serie
