= François Rollin =

French actor, comedian, author and screenwriter (born 1953)

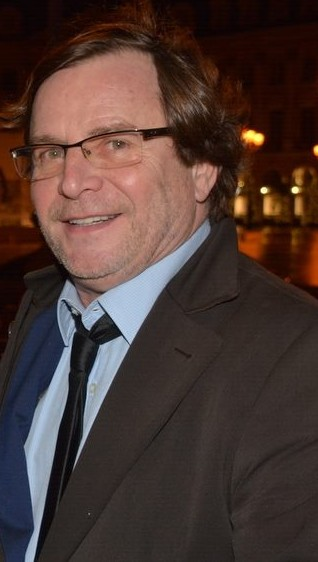
- François Rollin in 2008.
- Born: 31 May 1953 (age 72); Malo-les-Bains, France
- Occupations: Actor, author
- Years active: 1982–present

François Rollin (born 31 May 1953 in Malo-les-Bains) is a French actor, comedian, author and screenwriter.

He is known for his role as King Loth of Orkney in Kaamelott, Professor Rollin in Palace, and for writing the satirical news programme Les Guignols de l'info. He is also known for one-man-shows, in which he embodies the role of a whimsical and very articulate professor, alternating surreal and absurd humour with social satire.

== Filmography ==
- 1982-1984 : Merci Bernard (TV Series)
- 1988-1989 : Palace (TV Series)
- 1989 : Navarro (TV Series)
- 1990 : Le provincial
- 1991 : Le piège (TV Movie)
- 1993 : Jacques le fataliste
- 1995 : Associations de bienfaiteurs (TV Series)
- 1997 : L'Agence Lambert, L (TV Series)
- 1999 : Je règle mon pas sur le pas de mon père
- 2000 : La bostella
- 2000 : Les frères Soeur
- 2001 : Lacryma-Christine (Short)
- 2002 : Mille millièmes
- 2003 : The Car Keys
- 2003 : Le Grand Plongeoir (TV Series)
- 2005 : Akoibon
- 2005 : How Much Do You Love Me?
- 2005 : Zooloo (Short)
- 2006 : Avenue Montaigne
- 2006 : Momo Dub (Short)
- 2006-2009 : Kaamelott (TV Series)
- 2008 : Coluche: l'histoire d'un mec
- 2008 : Roméro et Juliette (TV Movie)
- 2008 : Chez Maupassant (TV Series)
- 2010 : Les invincibles (TV Series)
- 2010 : La peau de chagrin (TV Movie)
- 2012 : Main dans la main
- 2012 : Les Opérateurs (TV Mini-Series)
- 2013 : The Stroller Strategy
- 2013 : 16 ans ou presque
- 2014 : Lou! Journal infime
- 2014 : Le grimoire d'Arkandias
- 2014 : Profilage (TV Series)
- 2015 : Les nuits d'été
- 2016 : Hibou
- 2016 : Tamara
- 2017 : Pandas in the Mist (Short)
- 2018 : Bonhomme
- 2019 : Mike (TV Series)
- 2025 : Leave One Day

== Theater ==
- 1988 : Pendant ce temps nos deux héros, by Franck Arguillère & Yves Hirschfeld (director)
- 1990 : Hirondelles de saucisson by François Rollin (actor)
- 1996 : Colères by François Rollin (actor)
- 2000 : L'Envol du pingouin by Jean-Jacques Vanier (director)
- 2003 : Le professeur Rollin a encore quelque chose à dire by François Rollin (actor)
- 2005 : Chose promise by Arnaud Tsamere (director/writer)
- 2005 : Seul by Pierre Légaré (actor)
- 2006 : L'Envol du pingouin by Jean-Jacques Vanier (director)
- 2008 : Sophie Mounicot, c'est mon tour ! by Gérald Sibleyras & Sophie Mounicot (writer)
- 2008 : L'Envol du pingouin by Jean-Jacques Vanier (director)
- 2008 : Sans tambour ni tambour & Canard laqué by Trompettes de Lyon (director)
- 2008 : Colères by François Rollin (actor)
- 2009 : Elles by Jean-Jacques Vanier (director)
- 2011 : Ici et Maintenant by Guy Carlier (director)
- 2012 : Avec le temps... by Catherine Laborde (writer)
- 2013 : Address Unknown (novel) by Kathrine Taylor (actor)
- 2013 : No 9 by Jean-Marie Bigard (director)
- 2014 : Le professeur Rollin se rebiffe by François Rollin (actor)
- 2014 : S'il se passe quelque chose by Vincent Dedienne (director)
- 2016 : Le professeur Rollin se re-rebiffe by François Rollin (actor)
- 2016 : Tout s'arrange ! by Trompettes de Lyon (director)
- 2018 : La Dame de chez Maxim by Georges Feydeau (actor)
- 2018 : J'ai rien entendu mais j'ai tout compris by Tatiana Djordjevic (director)

== Author ==
- 2001 : J'ai réfléchi pour vous
- 2006 : Les Grands Mots du professeur Rollin
- 2007 : Les Belles Lettres du professeur Rollin
- 2009 : Astier et Rollin posent les bases de la pensée moderne : entretien libre sur la transmission entre générations (with Alexandre Astier)
- 2011 : Les Rollinettes
- 2015 : Colères
- 2015 : Les dictées loufoques du professeur Rollin
- 2016 : Epîtres (with Arnaud Joyet & Arnaud Tsamere)
