= Château du Tournel =

Ruined feudal castle in Lozère, France

Coordinates: 44°29′58″N 3°42′15″E

The Château du Tournel is a ruined feudal castle in the commune of Saint-Julien-du-Tournel in the Lozère département of France. A former seat of the Barons of Tournel, one of the eight baronies of Gévaudan, it was destroyed during the French Wars of Religion by Huguenot troops under Matthieu Merle.

== Position ==
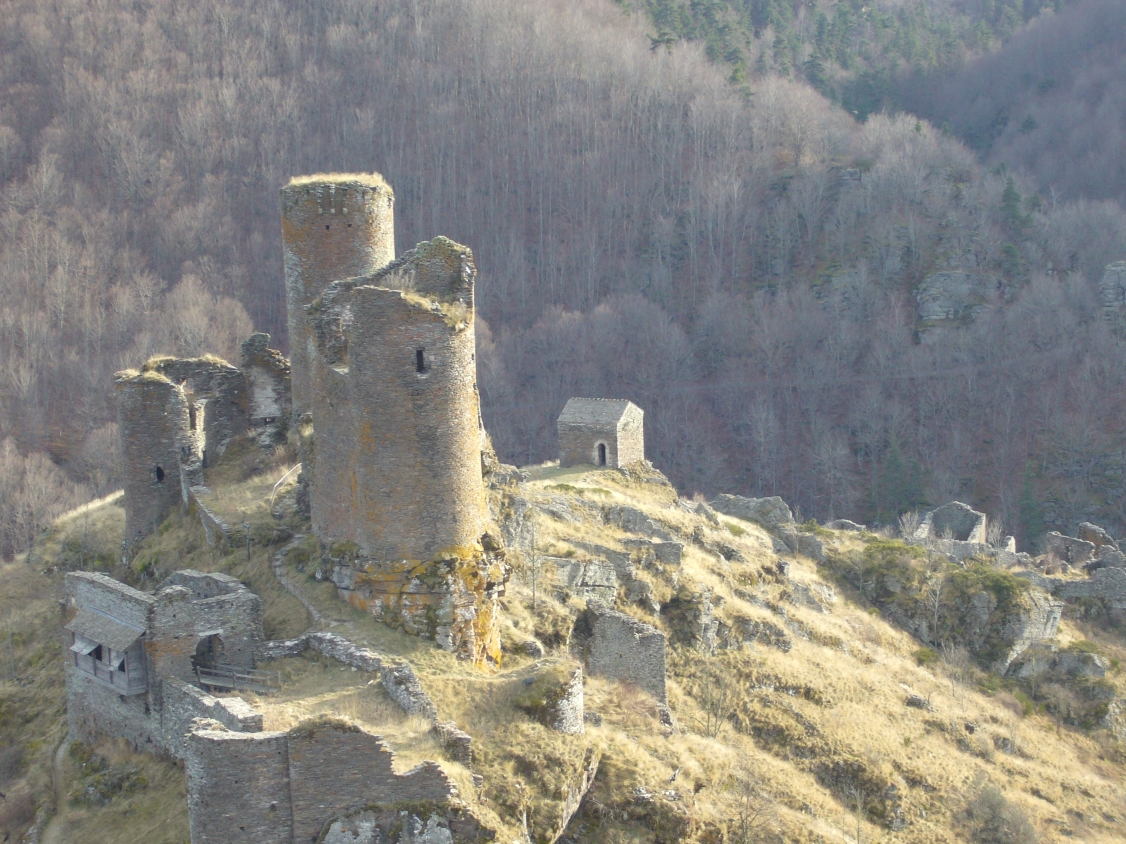
General view of the castle

The castle is sited on a rocky outcrop which dominates the upper valley of the Lot. It is in a strategic position, taking into account the possessions of the Tournel family. From its towers, one can see Mont Lozère, the highest point in the region.

== History ==
Arms of the Barons of Tournel

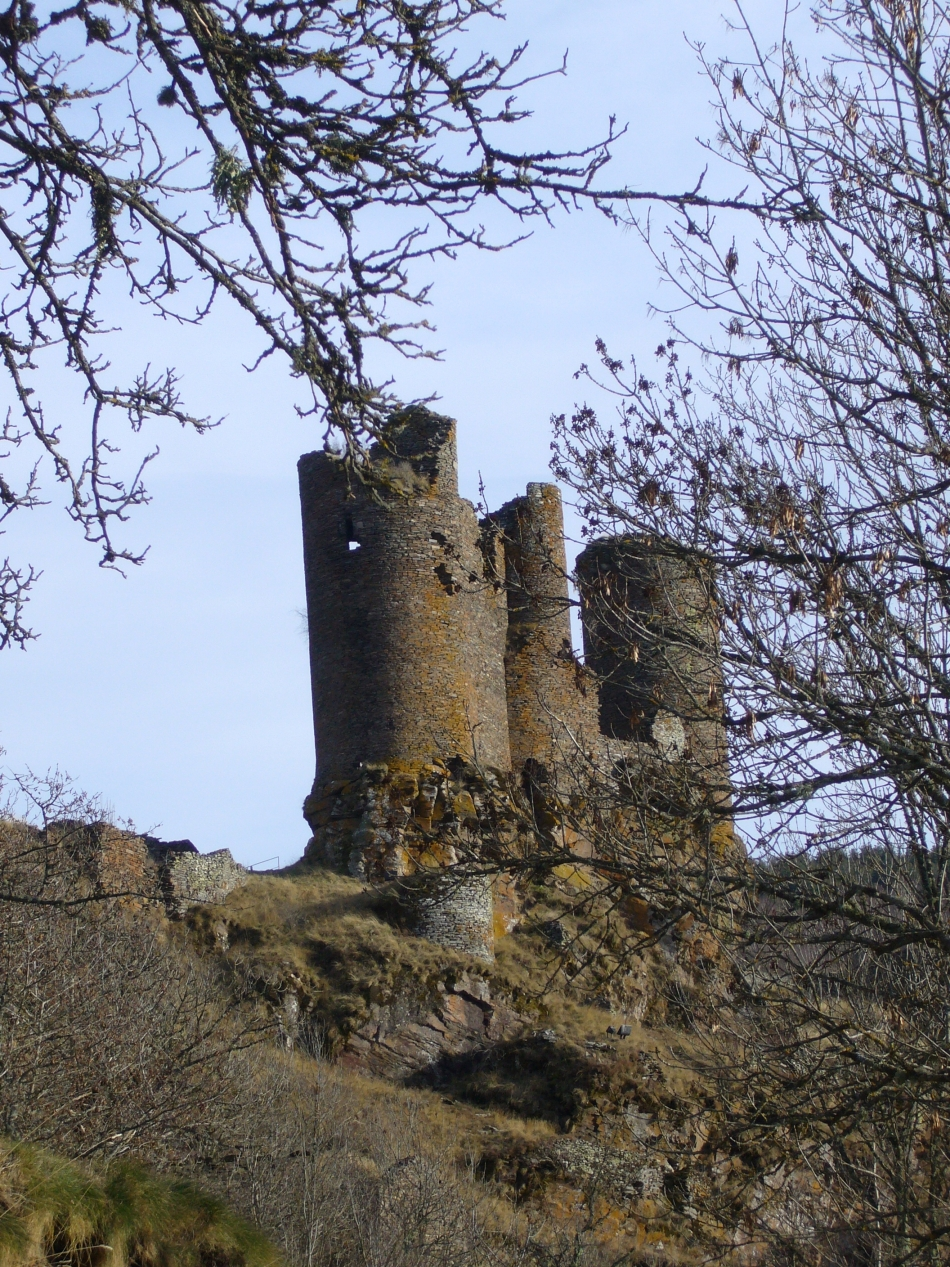
View from the village of Tournel

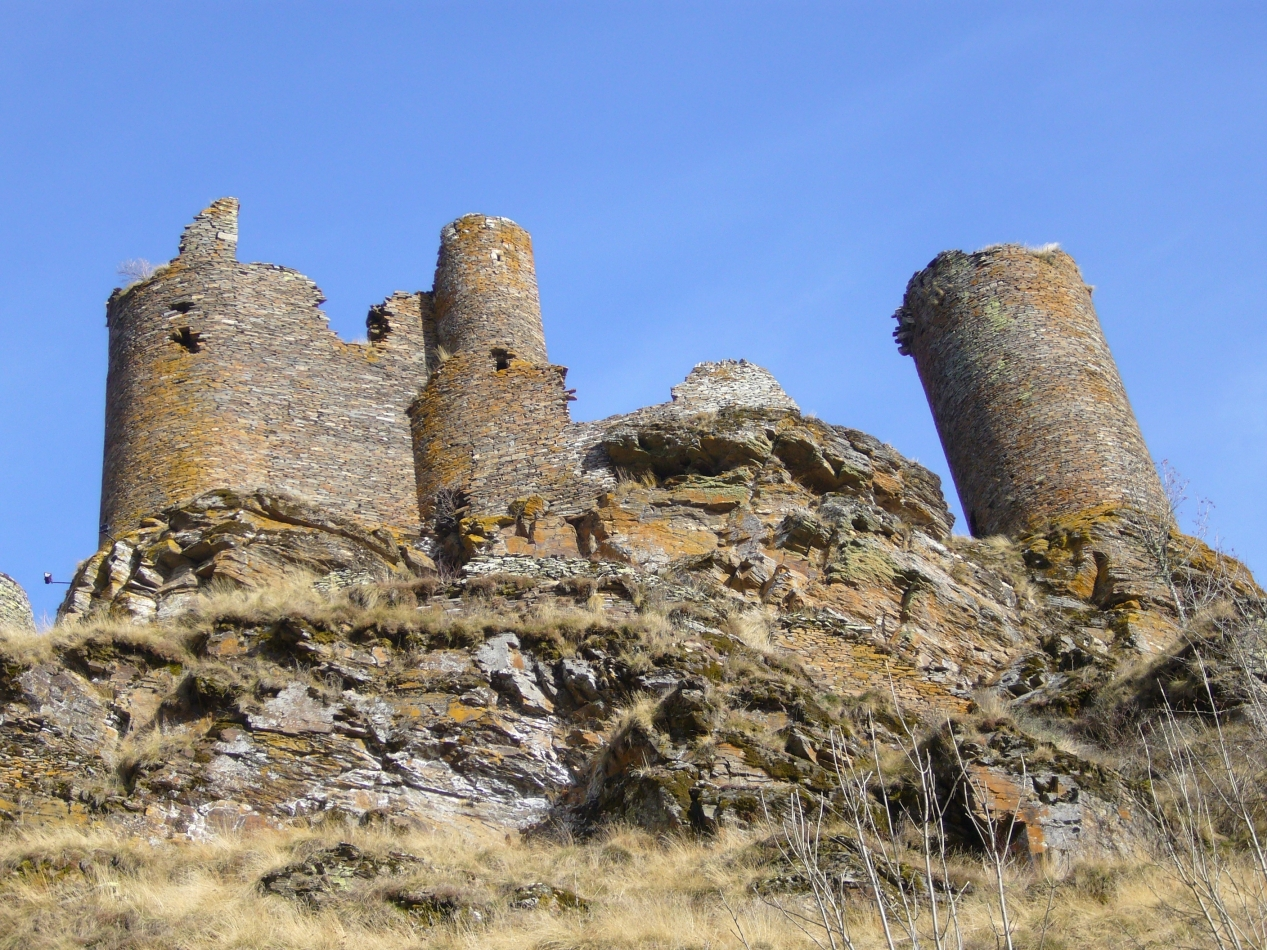
View from below

Before the 13th century, the Tournel family regarded themselves more as seigneurs than barons. It was in this period that the castle was built. At the time, the barony had split into five châtelains: Tournel, Chapieu, Montialoux, Montmirat and Montfort. The Château du Tournel was thus the main and central of their possessions which extended through the Lot valley from Mont Lozère to Mende, and included the Valdonnez valley.

The fortifications of the Château de Chapieu (on Mont Mimat, above Mende) were consolidated by Bishop Aldebert III du Tournel, son of Odilon-Guérin I, baron of Tournel. It seems that it was at Chapieu that the family was established before the 13th century (the name Tournel having been added later for Aldebert), since one can see the name of Capio (for Chapieu) in the name of the 12th century trobairitz (troubador) Iseut de Capio.

However, around 1307, the family decided to move away from the castle, preferring the comfort of the Château du Boy in the Valdonnez.

The site was reputed to be impenetrable, and was thus a very important possession for the Tournels during the various wars and disputes that interrupted life in medieval Gévaudan. However, at the start of the Hundred Years' War, the family thought more of heavily fortifying their castle at Boy than of returning to Tournel. The various wars of religion followed, during which the castle was destroyed for the first time around 1500. It then underwent the torments of Matthieu Merle's Huguenot troops, but was finally liberated with the arrival of the baron from Boy. It was then completely abandoned, without being restored.

It has, however, been maintained since the 20th century and visitors can follow an explanatory trail.

== Plan of the castle ==
At the time that it was inhabited, it was necessary to pass through seven entrances before being able to penetrate into the castle. Certain passages between gateways were close to the cliff which dominates the Lot, making it well-defended site.

The castle was composed of six towers.

== The castle in culture ==
The castle appeared on the record sleeve of Chant des Partisans, released by Yves Montand in 1955.

The castle can be seen in the 2005 film Saint-Jacques... La Mecque, directed by Coline Serreau.

In the 2008 season of the French science fiction TV show Hero Corp, supervillain "The Lord" resided in the Château du Tournel.

== See also ==
- List of castles in France
