= Le Bec-Fin =

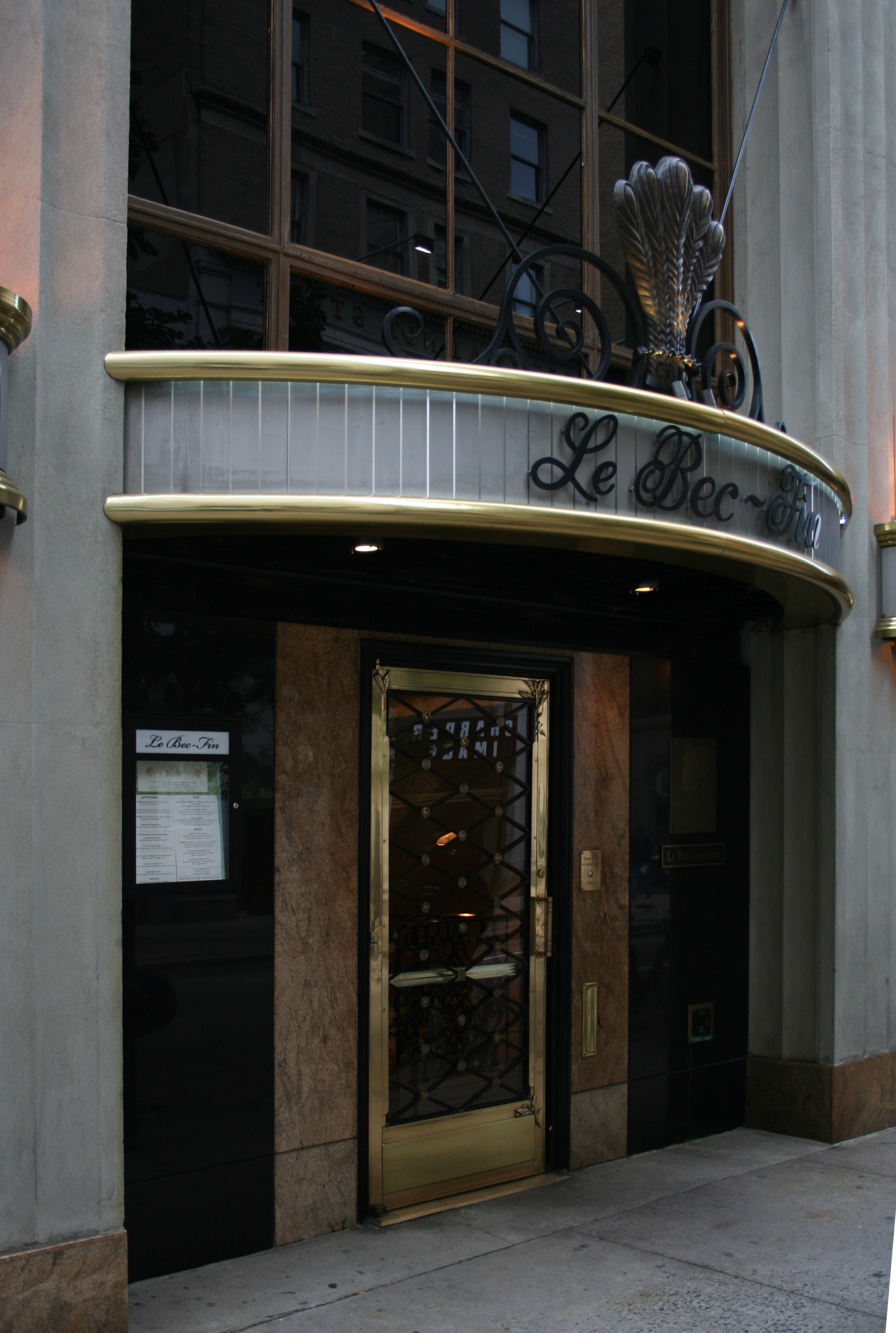
- Le Bec-Fin entrance on Walnut Street
- Interactive map of Le Bec-Fin

Restaurant information
- Established: 1970; 56 years ago
- Closed: 2013; 13 years ago
- Owner: Georges Perrier
- Food type: French
- Location: Philadelphia, Pennsylvania
- Coordinates: 39.94979°N 75.16704°W

Le Bec-Fin was a French restaurant in Philadelphia, Pennsylvania, that first opened in 1970. Owner and founder Georges Perrier named the restaurant after the French colloquialism for "fine palate". The restaurant had been rated America's finest French restaurant, and the Mobil Travel Guide traditionally awarded it five stars. Although Perrier announced in July 2010 that he planned to close the restaurant in spring 2011, he waited until February 2012 to sell Le Bec-Fin to one of its former managers, Nicolas Fanucci, who re-opened Le Bec-Fin in June 2012. The restaurant closed for good in June 2013.

== History ==
Georges Perrier trained at La Pyramide in Vienne, France. He moved to the U.S. on November 17, 1967, at the age of 23, and started working in Philadelphia. After its opening in 1970 at 1312 Spruce St. (Perrier was 26), Le Bec-Fin soon established a reputation as Philadelphia's finest restaurant, with Perrier's Galette de Crabe and Quenelles de Brochet as signature highlights. By 1981, Le Bec-Fin was known as the leader of the "Philadelphia restaurant revolution." The restaurant moved to its final location at 1523 Walnut Street in 1983. Esquire described it as the best French restaurant in America and a 1994 Condé Nast reader's poll ranked it as the best restaurant in the country.

The Le Bec-Fin signature crab cake recipe can be found online, and is also featured in Georges Perrier's 1997 book, titled Le Bec-Fin Recipes. Perrier's cuisine favors traditional French ingredients with high-quality produce from throughout the world. The wine list favored selections from the borders of France and some standouts from the new world.

Perrier made extensive changes to the restaurant after the Mobil Travel Guide reduced it to 4-star status in the 2001 guide. The interior was remodeled, the wine list expanded, and Perrier relinquished command of his restaurant to the head chef. Perrier said to his staff, "Change everything but the chandeliers." In the 2003 guide, the fifth star was restored.

On April 4, 2008, Le Bec-Fin gave up its 5-star rating in favor of a more relaxed atmosphere. This loss dropped the number of American 5-star restaurants to 16. The change to a more relaxed atmosphere included à la carte dining as opposed to a fixed price menu with a strict seating schedule.

In January 2009, the French government awarded Perrier the Legion d'Honneur.

Although he denied it at first, Georges Perrier put the building up for sale in 2010. During a dinner at the restaurant several months later, however, he announced that he would keep the restaurant open indefinitely. Prompted by an unfavorable review, Perrier announced his retirement in February 2012 and sold Le Bec-Fin to one of its former managers, Nicolas Fanucci, who re-opened the restaurant in June 2012 after remodeling and making minor adjustments. Master chef Walter Abrams, formerly of the restaurant French Laundry, led the kitchen, stressing locally-grown ingredients and fresh produce.

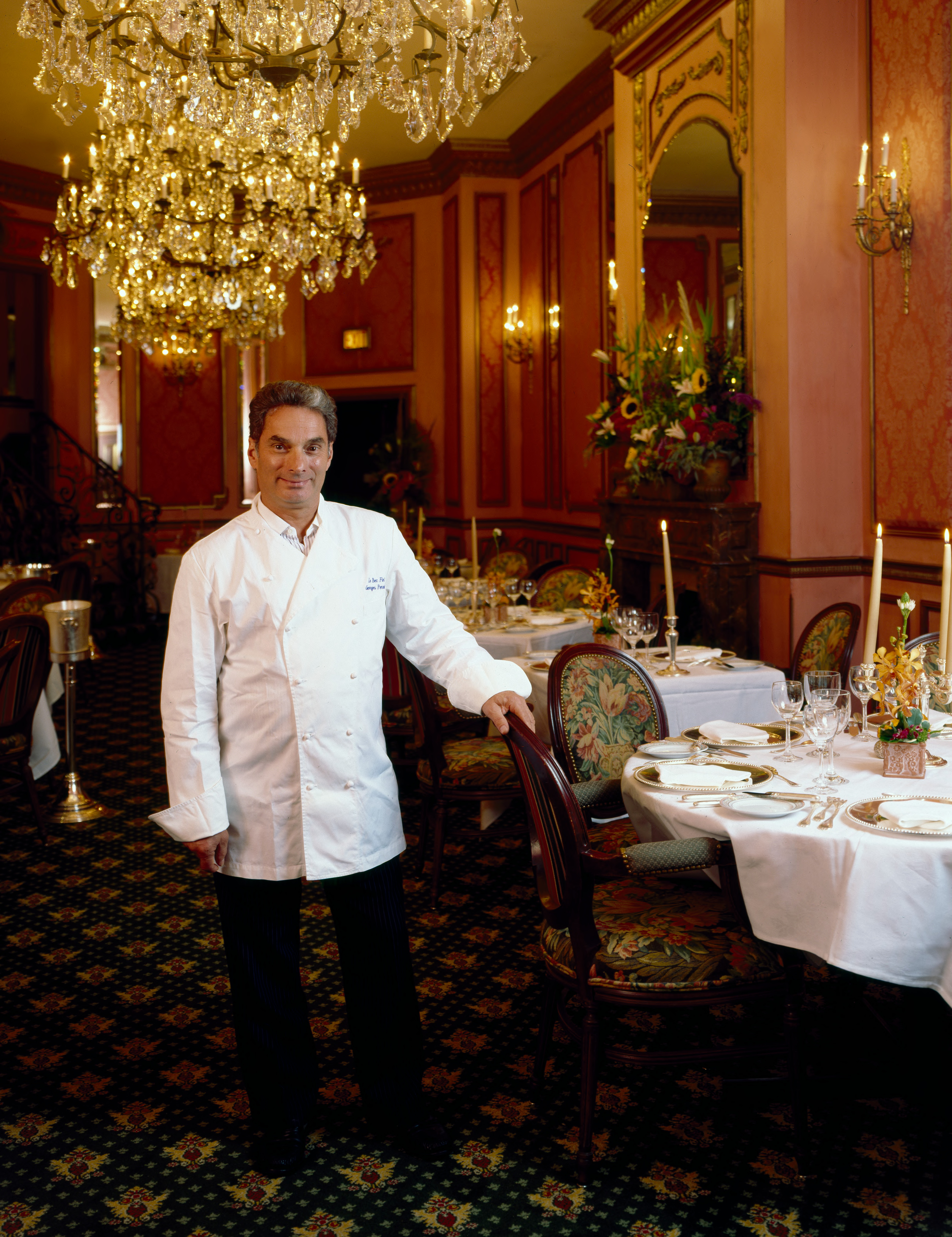
Founder Georges Perrier photographed in Le Bec-Fin by Carol M. Highsmith in the 1990s.

Upon hearing of the restaurant's closure, filmmaker Erika Frankel began making a documentary on Perrier and his restaurant. Entitled King Georges, the film premiered in April 2015 at a film festival.

Le Bec-Fin closed after dinner service on June 15, 2013. The space then housed Chef Justin Bogle's progressive American restaurant Avance, which closed October 11, 2014 after 10 months.

== See also ==
- List of French restaurants
