= Hero Corp =

- Genre: Comedy science fiction
- Created by: Simon Astier
- Country of origin: France
- Original language: French
- No. of series: 5
- No. of episodes: 93

Original release
- Network: Comédie! (2008-2009); France 4 (2009-present)
- Release: 25 October 2008 – present

Hero Corp is a French comedic science fiction TV show that has aired 93 episodes over 5 seasons, beginning in October 2008 on the cable channel Comédie!. In July 2009 it began broadcasting on France 4. The show is created, directed by and stars Simon Astier, previously seen in the TV show Kaamelott. The seasons one and two began to be aired in 2008 on the cable channel Comédie! and were rebroadcast on France 4 and Game One. The third season was broadcast on France 4 from the 21 October 2013. The fourth season has been aired from December 19, 2014 on France 4 and from the 9 February on Game One. A fifth season is in progress for France 4.

== Storyline ==
Following a war which took place in the 1980s, it was decided to create an organization to include all the superheroes to maintain world peace: the Hero Corp agency. The agency has several secret sites all over the planet. In the department of Lozère, the retired, the fired, those resigning and the unmasked. Cut off from the rest of the world they have a quiet and peaceful life. But twenty years later this peaceful existence is destroyed when the supervillain 'The Lord' reappears!

According to a vision by 'The Voice', the character John is the only solution to this catastrophe, but the corporation prefers to keep that under wraps. John travels to a small village in southern France for his aunt's funeral, someone he hasn't seen for over 10 years. Over the next few days in the village John gets the feeling that people are keeping secrets from him. Strange things constantly happen and eventually he discovers that the village is populated by retired superheroes. Plus, living secretly among them is a supervillain whom everyone believes is long dead.

== Cast ==
=== Main characters ===
- Simon Astier : John « Bouclier Man »
- Alban Lenoir : Klaus « Force Mustang »
- Gérard Darier : Stève « Brasier »
- Agnès Boury : Mary « Renaissance »
- François Podetti : Burt « Acid Man », « Captain Shampoo » or « Tornado »
- Philippe Noël : Cécil, the Mayor « Captain Transformation »
- Arnaud Joyet : Stan « Mental »
- Étienne Fague : Mique, the Mayor's son
- Sébastien Lalanne : Doug « Sérum »
- Maurice Lamy : Allen « Captain Cold » (Season 1)
- Christian Bujeau : Ethan « The Lord »
- Aurore Pourteyron : Jennifer
- Josée Drevon : Mégane, Jennifer's mother

=== Guest stars ===
- Lionnel Astier : Neil Mac Kormack, boss of Hero Corp organisation.
- Didier Bénureau : Lawrence Awkins « Super Invisible », a scientist who became invisible.
- Jean-Luc Couchard : Dan, a mutant half-man, half-duck.
- François Frapier : Kyle, has visions during his sleep.
- Disiz la Peste : Paul Mc Cartney or Guy « Captain Trois-Rivières », assistant of Captain Canada.
- Jonathan Lambert : Bat Man.
- Baptiste Lecaplain
- Arnaud Tsamère : Captain Sports Extrêmes.
- Michel Courtemanche : Captain Canada.
- Hubert Saint-Macary : Matthew Hoodwink, Jennifer's father and previous Mayor of Montréal.
- Christophe Arnulf : Ron, possesses a Great Breath and maintains a rivalry with Steve.
- Erik Gerken : Valur, a class 14 super-hero. He is native of Iceland and masters the lightning.
- Alexandre Astier : Araignée Man, guard of the secret bunker.
- Patrick Vo : Jean Micheng has the power to take aback his enemies by speaking Vietnamese, then to stun them with a ball of handball brought out from nowhere.
- Pierre Palmade : Hoger, strange philosopher lycanthrope
- Pascal Légitimus : Favreau, Mayor of Montréal.
- Bérengère Krief : Britney
- Manu Payet : Fourmi-Man
- Pascal Elso : Nacheem

== Episodes ==
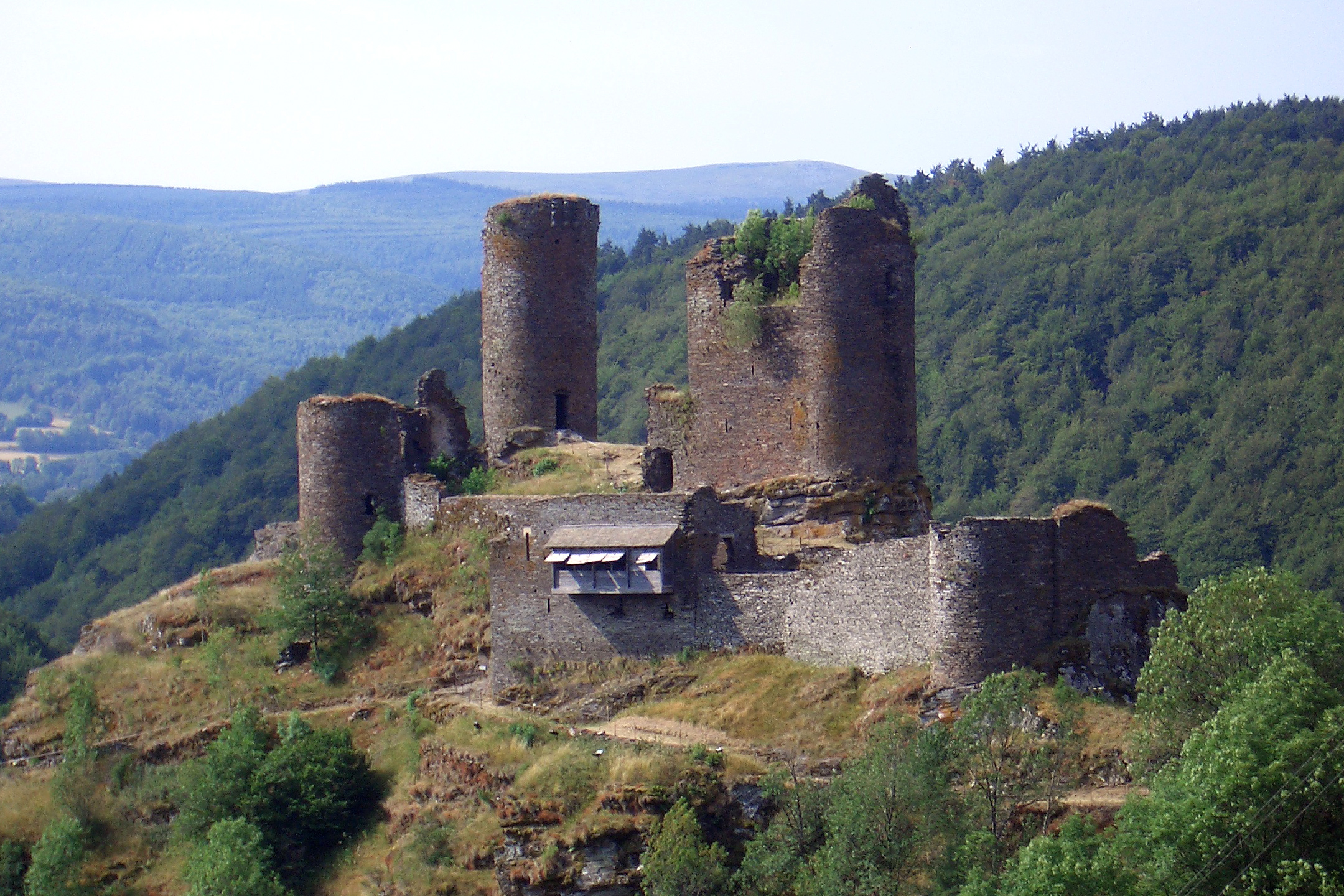
The ramshackle Château du Tournel, lair of "The Lord"

=== First season (2008) ===
1. Le village (The village)
2. Le test (The test)
3. Le grand départ (The great departure)
4. Révélations (Revelations)
5. Recherches (Searches)
6. Retour aux sources (Back to basics)
7. À l’intérieur (Inside)
8. Nouvelle donne (New deal)
9. Emplettes (Shopping)
10. L’alerte (Alert)
11. Chez l'habitant (Homestay)
12. Nouvelle peau (New skin)
13. Die hard (Die hard)
14. Duel (Duel)
15. Après le calme (After the calm)

=== Second season (2010) ===
1. La tempête (The storm)
2. La leçon (The lesson)
3. Ex-æquo (Equally)
4. La mine (The mine)
5. Au pied des murs (At feet of walls)
6. Nouveau toit (New roof)
7. Intrus (Intruder)
8. Du bon côté (The good side)
9. Servir l’homme (Serve the man)
10. Dix-sept survivants (Seventeen survivors)
11. Retrouvailles (Reunion)
12. Stratèges (Strategists)
13. Instructions (Instructions)
14. Une nouvelle ère 1/2 (A new era - Part 1)
15. Une nouvelle ère 2/2 (A new era - Part 2)

=== Third season (2013) ===
For the third season, Simon Astier and France 4 have developed a smartphone application to serve as transition between season 2 and 3, which will precede the TV broadcast, the device interactive series will begin on August 2, 2013 and the series will broadcast in France on September 4 at 8pm. The format of the series also changed, from 15 26-minute episodes to 36 episodes of approximately 7 minutes.

=== Fourth season (2014) ===
In 2014, France 4 renewed the show for a fourth season. The format of the series will change again. Season 4 will consist of 19 episodes of 12 minutes each.

=== Fifth season (2017) ===
The fifth and last season consists of 8 episodes and has been diffused from the 12 May to the 7 June 2017.

== Production ==
The production company's ultimate owner is the French conglomerate Lagardère Group. The show is mostly shot in the Lozère department, with a ruined castle near Mende providing the lair of "The Lord", the show's supervillain. Some scenes were shot in Montreal, Quebec, Canada. Music is provided by the French composer Etienne Forget.

== See also ==
- List of French television series
