= Jérémy Ferrari =

French humorist and actor

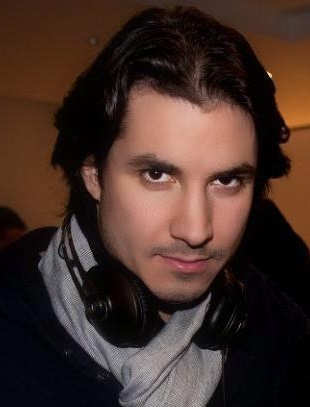
- Born: 6 April 1985 (age 41); Villers-Semeuse, Ardennes, France
- Occupations: Comedian, presenter
- Notable work: On n'demande qu'à en rire
- Style: Black comedy
- Website: jeremyferrari.fr

Jérémy Ferrari (born 6 April 1985) is a French comedian and radio/television presenter. He is known for his black comedy. In his comedic sketches, he deals with racism, xenophobia, misogyny, and other forms of discrimination.

== Biography ==
Ferrari grew up in the Ardennes, in the commune of Villers-Semeuse. His parents worked in local shops. In high school, Ferrari dropped out in order to study theatre and comedy in more detail. At a young age, he began to tour and present his first one-man show, De sketches en sketches, and at the age of seventeen, he went to Paris to study in the Cours Florent drama school.

A well-known comedian in France, he shares an on-stage rivalry with comedian Arnaud Tsamère.

== Career ==
=== Theatre ===
- De sketches en sketches
- Moi, méchant ?
- Les Wesh
- Deux chaises vides, a play by Bertrand Matthieu, in which he played the poet Arthur Rimbaud
- Mes 7 péchés capitaux
- Hallelujah Bordel ! (released on DVD November 2013)
- Festival d'Avignon
- Festival du Rire
- La tournée du trio, with Arnaud Tsamere and Baptiste Lecaplain
- Vends 2 pièces à Beyrouth
- Anesthésie Générale

=== Television ===
- 2005 : Morning Café, M6
- 2010 - 2012 : On n'demande qu'à en rire, France 2
- 2011 : On a tout révisé, France 2
- 2011 : On n'est pas couché, France 2
- 2012 - 2013 : ONDAR Show, France 2
- 2013 : Présentation de la météo le 11 avril 2013 au Grand Journal
- 2013 : Carte blanche à Jérémy Ferrari et Arnaud Tsamère, France 4
- 2013 : Touche pas à mon poste !, D8
- 2013 : Le Marrakech du rire 3, M6 (TV channel)
- 2014 : L'Émission pour tous, France 2
