= Véronique Augereau =

French voice actress (born 1957)

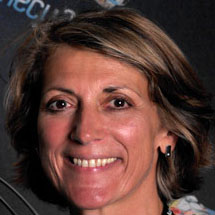
Véronique Augereau in 2008

Véronique Augereau (born 25 May 1957) is a French actress who is notably active in dubbing. She is especially known for providing the voice of Marge Simpson in the French version of the animated series The Simpsons.

She is the wife of Philippe Peythieu, who voices Homer Simpson, so also husband and wife in real life.

== Biography ==
Trained at the Rouen Conservatory, the Cours Florent, and Ensatt, she met actor Philippe Peythieu on the dubbing set of the television series The Simpsons, and they had a child together in 1993 named Lou. She married Philippe Peythieu in 2001.

She has also been the regular French voice of Rene Russo, Jamie Lee Curtis, Marcia Gay Harden, Alexandra Paul, Joan Allen, Annabeth Gish, Leslie Hope, and Linda Hamilton since Terminator 2. In animation, in addition to Marge Simpson, Patty, and Selma Bouvier in The Simpsons, she has also voiced Catwoman and Poison Ivy in the Batman series, as well as Lois Lane in most of the animated series and films in the Superman franchise.
