= Philippe Peythieu =

French comedian (born 1950)

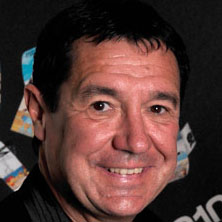
Philippe Peythieu in 2008

Philippe Peythieu (born 12 January 1950) is a French actor. He specialises in dubbing, and is especially known for providing the voice of Homer Simpson in the French version of the animated series The Simpsons. He has also regularly voiced the actor Danny DeVito since the film Batman Returns. In the dub of Lupin III Part 1, he voiced Daisuke Jigen.

He is married to actress Véronique Augereau, who does the voice of Marge Simpson, and is the brother of Christian Peythieu, also an actor.
