= Strip-Tease (TV series) =

- Genre: Documentary
- Created by: RTBF (Belgian public TV)
- Narrated by: Manault Deva; Martine Matagne
- Countries of origin: Belgium; France
- Original language: French
- No. of episodes: 418 (2012)

Production
- Camera setup: Single-camera
- Running time: Variable
- Production company: VF Films Production

Original release
- Network: La Une (RTBF); France 3 (France Télévision)
- Release: 1985 (Belgium); 1992 (France)

Related
- Tout ça (ne nous rendra pas le Congo) (Belgium only)

Strip-Tease is a Belgian television documentary program that first aired on RTBF 1 in 1985. It later aired in Franco-Belgian on France 3 in 1992. According to its creators, it aims to treat subjects "caught in the facts of society". The program is considered controversial for its crude discussion of difficult situations.

== Concept of the show ==
Strip-Tease was created by Marco Lamensch and Jean Libon. Their aim was to achieve a new kind of documentary in which the commentators disappear, allowing the subjects themselves to speak. The program deals mainly with moments of everyday life (family meals, doing household chores, working on a farm, etc.). The idea is that the viewer is meant to identify with these intimate moments of their daily lives, demonstrated in the show's tagline: "Strip-Tease: The program that undresses you."

The show, of course, takes its name from the English word "striptease," also known as "stripping." The participants of the show gradually "undress" or reveal their private lives to the audience, allowing viewers to learn about them on a deeper, uncensored level. However, some viewers have complained that some episodes have turned the subjects into ones of ridicule without their knowledge.

Though some episodes air as Strip-Tease on France 3, Tout ça (ne nous rendra pas le Congo) is actually a revival of the show, but with a format of 52 minutes.

Past editions of the show are archived on the RTBF website.
