= Arnaud Joyet =

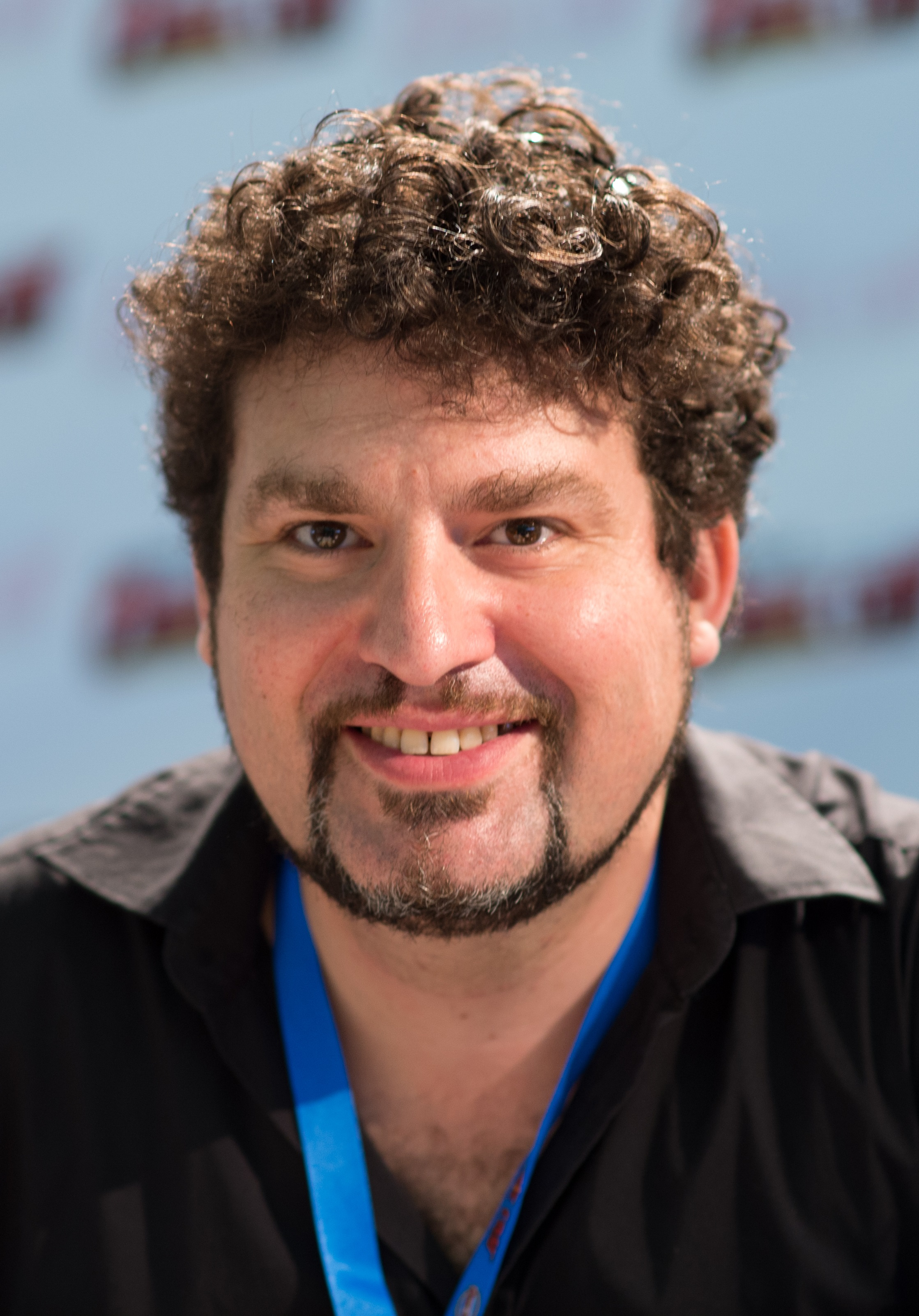
- Arnaud Joyet at the fifth Paris Comic-con
- Born: 3 April 1974 (age 52); Var, France
- Occupations: Musician, singer, theatre director, comedian
- Notable work: Hero Corp

Arnaud Joyet (born 3 April 1974, Var, France) is a French singer, musician, comedian and theatre director. He plays Stan in the series Hero Corp.

== Filmography ==
Year	Title	Type	Role	Notes
2023	Poisson rouge	Film	Dr. Gérard	
2022	Les Supers	Short film	Lui-même	
2022	Visitors	TV series	Carlos	5 episodes
2019	Salle de Profs	TV series	Dominique	2 episodes
2015	Ma pire angoisse	TV series	Policier 1	1 episode
2008–2017	Hero Corp	TV series	Stan	73 episodes
