= List of French films of 2016 =

A list of French-produced films scheduled for release in 2016.

== 2016 ==
Title	Director	Cast	Genre	Notes	Release date
Chocolat	Roschdy Zem	Omar Sy, James Thiérrée, Clotilde Hesme	Drama		3 February
The Dancer	Stéphanie Di Giusto	Soko, Gaspard Ulliel, Mélanie Thierry, Lily-Rose Depp	Drama, Biopic	Co-production with Belgium and Czech Republic	28 September
Divines	Houda Benyamina	Oulaya Amamra, Déborah Lukumuena	drama		19 May
Elle	Paul Verhoeven	Isabelle Huppert, Laurent Lafitte	Thriller		25 May
Faultless (Irréprochable)	Sébastien Marnier	Marina Foïs, Jérémie Elkaïm, Joséphine Japy, Benjamin Biolay	Thriller		3 July
Frantz	François Ozon	Pierre Niney, Paula Beer	Drama		7 September
From the Land of the Moon	Nicole Garcia	Marion Cotillard, Louis Garrel, Àlex Brendemühl	Drama		19 October
Heaven Will Wait (Le Ciel attendra)	Marie-Castille Mention-Schaar				
It's Only the End of the World	Xavier Dolan	Gaspard Ulliel, Marion Cotillard, Vincent Cassel, Nathalie Baye, Léa Seydoux	Drama	Co-production with Canada	21 September
The Jews	Yvan Attal	Benoît Poelvoorde, Dany Boon	Drama		1 June
My Life as a Zucchini	Claude Barras	Gaspard Schlatter	Animation		12 October
Nine Lives	Barry Sonnenfeld	Kevin Spacey, Jennifer Garner, Robbie Amell, Cheryl Hines, Malina Weissman, Christopher Walken	Family	co-production with China and Canada	3 August
Personal Shopper	Olivier Assayas	Kristen Stewart, Lars Eidinger	Drama		14 December
Radin!	François Gautier	Dany Boon	Comedy		2 September
Raw	Julia Ducournau		Horror		15 March
Shut In	Farren Blackburn	Naomi Watts	Psychological thriller	co-production with Canada, India and the United States	30 November
Things to Come	Mia Hansen-Løve	Isabelle Huppert	Drama		6 April
Two Is a Family	Hugo Gélin	Omar Sy	Comedy	adaptation of Instructions Not Included (2013)	7 December
A Wedding	Stephan Streker	Lina El Arabi	drama	co-production with Belgium, Luxembourg, and Pakistan	24 August
