= Benjamin Lavernhe =

French actor (born 1984)

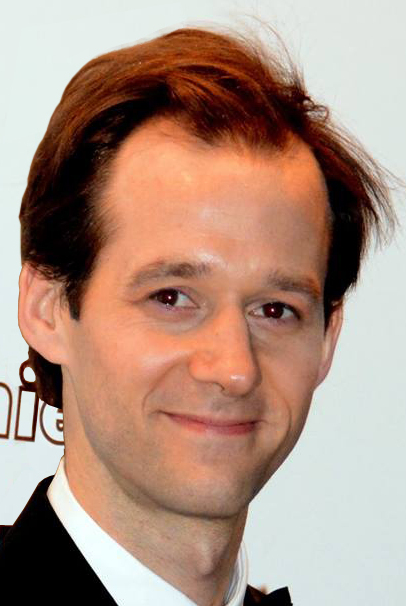
- Lavernhe at the 2018 César Awards
- Born: 14 August 1984 (age 42); Poitiers, France
- Occupation: Actor
- Years active: 2007–present

Benjamin Lavernhe (French pronunciation: [bɛ̃ʒamɛ̃ lavɛʁn], born 14 August 1984) is a French actor.

== Career ==
After attending evening classes at Cours Florent, a private drama school in Paris, France, Lavernhe began taking free classes at Cours Florent, studying under the direction of, among others, Jean-Pierre Garnier and Loïc Corbery.

He began his acting career in 2008 by entering the Conservatoire national supérieur d'art dramatique. His first major role in theater came in 2011 when he played the role of Benvolio in a staging of the romantic tragedy Romeo and Juliet by William Shakespeare, directed by Olivier Py.

Since 2012, he has been a resident of the Comédie-Française.

He was nominated for two Molière Award: in 2018 for his lead role in Scapin the Schemer, directed by Denis Podalydès and in 2023 for his supporting role in The Lady from the Sea, directed by Géraldine Martineau.

He was also nominated three times for a César Award: once in the category Most Promising Actor for playing Pierre in C'est la vie!, directed by Éric Toledano and Olivier Nakache, and twice in the category Best Supporting Actor for Love at Second Sight directed by Hugo Gélin and My Donkey, My Lover & I directed by Caroline Vignal.

== Theater ==
Year	Title	Author	Director	Notes
2007	L’Opéra du dragon	Heiner Müller	Joséphine Serre	
2010	Les Prétendants	Jean-Luc Lagarce	Mario Gonzalez	
2011-12	Romeo and Juliet	William Shakespeare	Olivier Py	
2012-13	La Place royale	Pierre Corneille	Anne-Laure Liégeois	
2013	Three Sisters	Anton Chekhov	Alain Françon	
2013	Un fil à la patte	Georges Feydeau	Jérôme Deschamps	
2013	Troilus and Cressida	William Shakespeare	Jean-Yves Ruf	
2013	The Imaginary Invalid	Molière	Claude Stratz	
2013-14	Phèdre	Jean Racine	Michael Marmarinos	
2013-15	Hamlet	William Shakespeare	Dan Jemmett	
2014	Dom Juan	Molière	Jean-Pierre Vincent	
2014-15	The Misanthrope	Molière	Clément Hervieu-Léger	
2014-15	A Midsummer Night's Dream	William Shakespeare	Muriel Mayette-Holtz	
2014-16	The Italian Straw Hat	Eugène Labiche	Giorgio Barberio Corsetti	
2014-19	Lucrezia Borgia	Victor Hugo	Denis Podalydès	
2015	La Dame aux jambes d’azur	Eugène Labiche & Marc-Michel	Jean-Pierre Vincent	
2016	Britannicus	Jean Racine	Stéphane Braunschweig	
2016	L’Interlope	Serge Bagdassarian	Serge Bagdassarian	
2016	Un fil à la patte	Georges Feydeau	Jérôme Deschamps	
2016	Le Chant du cygne / L’Ours	Anton Chekhov	Maëlle Poésy	
2016-17	La Ronde	Arthur Schnitzler	Anne Kessler	
2017-18	The Tempest	William Shakespeare	Robert Carsen	
2017-18	The Rules of the Game	Jean Renoir	Christiane Jatahy	
2017-20	Scapin the Schemer	Molière	Denis Podalydès	Nominated - Molière Award for Best Actor
2018	Faust	Johann Wolfgang von Goethe	Valentine Losseau & Raphaël Navarro	
2018	L’Interlope	Serge Bagdassarian	Serge Bagdassarian	
2019	The Misanthrope	Molière	Clément Hervieu-Léger	
2019-20	Electra	Euripides	Ivo Van Hove	
2022	Cellule 107	Robert Badinter	Bernard Murat	
2022	Le Mariage forcé	Molière	Louis Arene	
2022	Scapin the Schemer	Molière	Denis Podalydès	
2023	The Lady from the Sea	Henrik Ibsen	Géraldine Martineau	Nominated - Molière Award for Best Supporting Actor
2023	The Threepenny Opera	Bertolt Brecht	Thomas Ostermeier	

== Filmography ==
Year	Title	Role	Director	Notes
2009	La cagnotte	Benjamin	Philippe Monnier	TV movie
2010	Les méchantes	Monsieur de la Resnois	Philippe Monnier	TV movie
2012	Radiostars	Smiters	Romain Levy	
2012	Pourquoi je fais ça?	Raphaël	Olivier Rosemberg	Short
2013	The Marchers	Thomas	Nabil Ben Yadir	
2013	Prenez une grande grande respiration	Caméron	Java Jacobs	Short
2013-15	Casting(s)	Benjamin	Pierre Niney & Hugo Gélin	TV series (11 episodes)
2014	Going Away	Thomas Cambière	Nicole Garcia	
2014	Libre et assoupi	Alexandre	Benjamin Guedj	
2014	Number One Fan	Guillaume	Jeanne Herry	
2014	France KBEK	Louis	Jonathan Cohen & Jérémie Galan	TV series (1 episode)
2015	SK1	Frédéric Brunet	Frédéric Tellier	
2015	The Sweet Escape	Bernard	Bruno Podalydès	
2015	The Sense of Wonder	Pierre	Éric Besnard	
2015	Ictus érotique	Alain	Keren Marciano	Short
2016	The Odyssey	Jean-Michel Cousteau	Jérôme Salle	
2016	Rupture pour tous	Mathias	Éric Capitaine	
2016	Un entretien	The HRD	Julien Patry	Short
2016	L'âge de raison	George	Mathilde Petit	Short
2017	C'est la vie !	Pierre	Éric Toledano and Olivier Nakache	Nominated - César Award for Most Promising Actor
2018-21	Un entretien	The HRD	Julien Patry	TV series (30 episodes)
2019	Curiosa	Henri de Régnier	Lou Jeunet	
2019	Love at Second Sight	Félix	Hugo Gélin	Nominated - César Award for Best Supporting Actor
2020	My Donkey, My Lover & I	Vladimir Loubier	Caroline Vignal	Nominated - César Award for Best Supporting Actor
2020	I Wish Someone Were Waiting for Me Somewhere	Mathieu Armanville	Arnaud Viard	
2021	Delicious	Duc de Chamfort	Éric Besnard	
2021	The Speech	Adrien	Laurent Tirard	
2021	The Accusation	Maître Arthur Célerier	Yvan Attal	
2021	The French Dispatch	Toothpowder Spokesman	Wes Anderson	
2022	Les engagés	David Vérand	Emilie Frèche	
2022	The Sixth Child	Julien Verlet	Léopold Legrand	
2022	Moitié.e.s	Benjamin	Félix Guimard	TV series (1 episode)
2023	Jeanne du Barry	Jean-Benjamin de La Borde	Maïwenn	
2023	Grand Expectations	Antoine Mandeville	Sylvain Desclous	
2023	Abbé Pierre – A Century of Devotion	Abbé Pierre	Frédéric Tellier	
2024	Modì, Three Days on the Wing of Madness	Monsieur Petit	Johnny Depp	
2024	En Fanfare	Thibaut	Emmanuel Courcol	
2026	Les Misérables	Thénardiers	Fred Cavayé	Adaptation of Les Misérables by Victor Hugo
Comédie-Française	Molière	Martin Darondeau, Bertrand Usclat		
