= The Wonderers =

French film by Joséphine Japy

- French theatrical release poster
- French: Qui brille au combat
- Directed by: Joséphine Japy
- Written by: Joséphine Japy; Olivier Torres
- Starring: Mélanie Laurent; Pierre-Yves Cardinal; Angelina Woreth; Sarah Pachoud
- Cinematography: Romain Carcanade
- Edited by: Nicolas Desmaison
- Music by: Mattia Luchini
- Production company: Cowboys Films
- Distributed by: Apollo Distribution
- Release dates: 15 May 2025 (Cannes); 31 December 2025 (France)
- Running time: 96 minutes
- Country: France
- Language: French
- Budget: €3.3 million

The Wonderers (French: Qui brille au combat) is a 2025 French drama film directed by Joséphine Japy in her directorial debut, from a screenplay she co-wrote with Olivier Torres based on the true story of her younger sister, Bertille, who has a severe disability that leads to autistic behavior. It stars Mélanie Laurent, Pierre-Yves Cardinal, Angelina Woreth and Sarah Pachoud.

The film had its world premiere at the Special Screenings section of the 2025 Cannes Film Festival on 15 May. It was released theatrically in France by Apollo Distribution on 31 December 2025.

== Plot ==
Set in the French Riviera, it follows a family dealing with the severe disability of their youngest daughter, 13-year-old Bertille, while her older sister, 17-year-old Marion, seeks refuge in a relationship with an older boy.

== Cast ==
- Mélanie Laurent as Madeleine
- Pierre-Yves Cardinal as Gilles
- Angelina Woreth as Marion
- Sarah Pachoud as Bertille
- Félix Kysyl as Thomas
- Anne Loiret
- Juliette Gasquet
- Thomas Gioria
- Birane Ba
- Maxence Tual
- Stéphane Varupenne
- Ilinka Lony
- Lucas Cenciai
- Najim Zeghoudi
- Pascal Decolland
- Serpentine Teyssier

== Production ==
=== Development ===
The Wonderers is the directorial debut of French actress Joséphine Japy. The screenplay, co-written by Japy and Olivier Torres, was based on the true story of Japy's younger sister, Bertille, who has a severe disability that Japy described as "a rare genetic disease that leads to autistic behavior". The film was produced by Cowboys Films.

Mélanie Laurent, Pierre-Yves Cardinal, Angelina Woreth and Sarah Pachoud were announced in the cast on 4 September 2024. Laurent directed Japy in her second film as a director, the coming-of-age drama Breathe (2014), which earned Japy a nomination for the César Award for Most Promising Actress. Anne Loiret, Juliette Gasquet, Félix Kysyl, Thomas Gioria, Birane Ba, Maxence Tual, Stéphane Varupenne, Ilinka Lony, Lucas Cenciai, Najim Zeghoudi, Pascal Decolland and Serpentine Teyssier completed the cast.

The film's original title was Bertille. Japy said she was looking at the meaning of her sister's name and found out that it means "the one who shines in battle" (or "woman warrior"), and literally "qui brille au combat" in French, which ended up being the film's final title in French.

=== Filming ===
Principal photography began in the South of France on 18 September 2024, and wrapped on 30 October 2024.

== Release ==
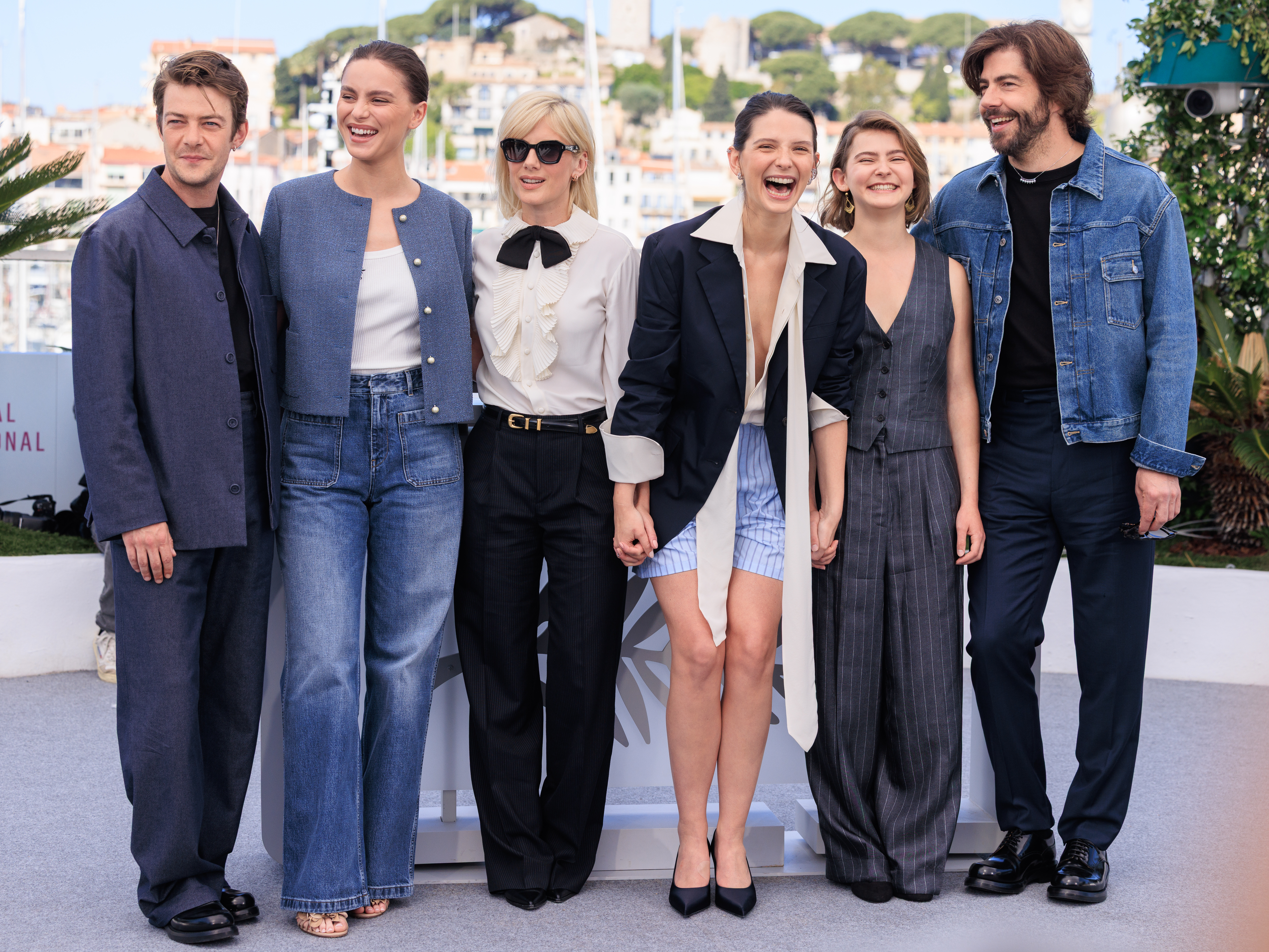
Cast and crew at the 2025 Cannes Film Festival on 15 May 2025.

Pulsar Content handles international sales and presented the film to buyers at the 2024 Toronto International Film Festival. The film had its world premiere at the 2025 Cannes Film Festival in the Special Screenings section on 15 May 2025.

Apollo Distribution released the film in France on 31 December 2025.

== Accolades ==
| Award / Festival | Date of ceremony | Category | Recipient(s) | Result | Ref. |
|---|---|---|---|---|---|
| Cannes Film Festival | 23 May 2025 | Caméra d'Or | Joséphine Japy | Nominated | |
| Festival 2 Valenciennes | 30 September 2025 | Revelation Award | Sarah Pachoud and Angelina Woreth | Won | |
| The Extraordinary Film Festival | 24 November 2025 | Best Film | Joséphine Japy | Nominated | |
