= Steve Tran =

French actor

- Born: 22 April 1985 (age 41); Saint-Germain-en-Laye, France
- Occupation: Actor
- Years active: 2000–present

Steve Tran (born 22 April 1985) is a French Vietnamese film and television actor. He has appeared in numerous titles, and in 2009, he recorded the soundtrack 'We Can Make It' for the film Tricheuse.

== Filmography ==
Year	Title	Role	Notes
2000	Regards d'enfance	Wang Min	TV series (1 episode)
2001	Les résultats du bac	Lang-Vonh	Short
2003	Lovely Rita, sainte patronne des cas désespérés	Danny	
2003	Poulet cocotte	Joël	Short
2003	P.J.	Cussac	TV series (1 episode)
2004	Julie Lescaut	Jérémie	TV series (1 episode)
2005	Cold Showers	Tranh	
2007	Central nuit	Hervé	TV series (1 episode)
2009	Tellement proches	Warned #2	
2009	Neuilly Yo Mama!	Picasso #2	
2009	P.J.	Klong / Christophe Beaunois	TV series (1 episode)
2009	Boulevard du Palais	Nurse	TV series (1 episode)
2010	Noir océan	Schaff	
2010	Protéger & servir	The waiter	
2010	Toi, moi, les autres	Steve	
2011	Beur sur la ville	Tong	
2011	1, 2, 3, voleurs	Tony	TV movie
2011	Saïgon, l'été de nos 20 ans	Vietnamese student	TV mini-series
2012	Haute Cuisine	Grégory	
2012	La cité rose	Manu	
2012	Obama e(s)t moi	Yoan	Short
2012	Clash	John Lee	TV series (1 episode)
2013	Cheba Louisa	David	
2013	La femme de Rio	Antoine	Short
2014	Une histoire banale	Steve	
2014	Le Père Noël	Taxi driver	
2014	Prêt à tout	Jim	
2014	Soldat blanc	Tran	TV movie
2015	Je suis un déménagement	Benoit	Short
2015	Voiler la face	The waiter	Short
2016	Quelques jours avec toi	Taxi driver	Short
2016	#Falltown	The voice	TV series (1 episode)
2016	Prof T.	Clovis Monod	TV series (2 episodes)
2017	La Mante	Achille	TV mini-series
2018	The Trouble with You	A client	
2018	Neuilly sa mère, sa mère!	Tran	
2018	Vaurien	Yann	
2019	Made in China	Félix	
2019	Twice Upon a Time	Than	TV series (4 episodes)
2019	Premier de la classe	Jean-Claude	
2019	Quartier des Banques	Mr. Chan	TV series (1 episode)
2019	Craignos	Le traducteur	TV series (1 episode)
2022	Le Flambeau : Les Aventuriers de Chupacabra	Jean Jack	TV series (1 episode)
2023	38°5 quai des Orfèvres	Le témoin-victime en chat	
2023	Asterix & Obelix: The Middle Kingdom	Mercenaire estrade	
2023	BAC+12	Maxime	
2023	Mémoires à Vif	Tao Pham	
2023	Poisson rouge		
2025	Fountain of Youth	Kasem	
