= Joséphine Japy =

French actress (born 1994)

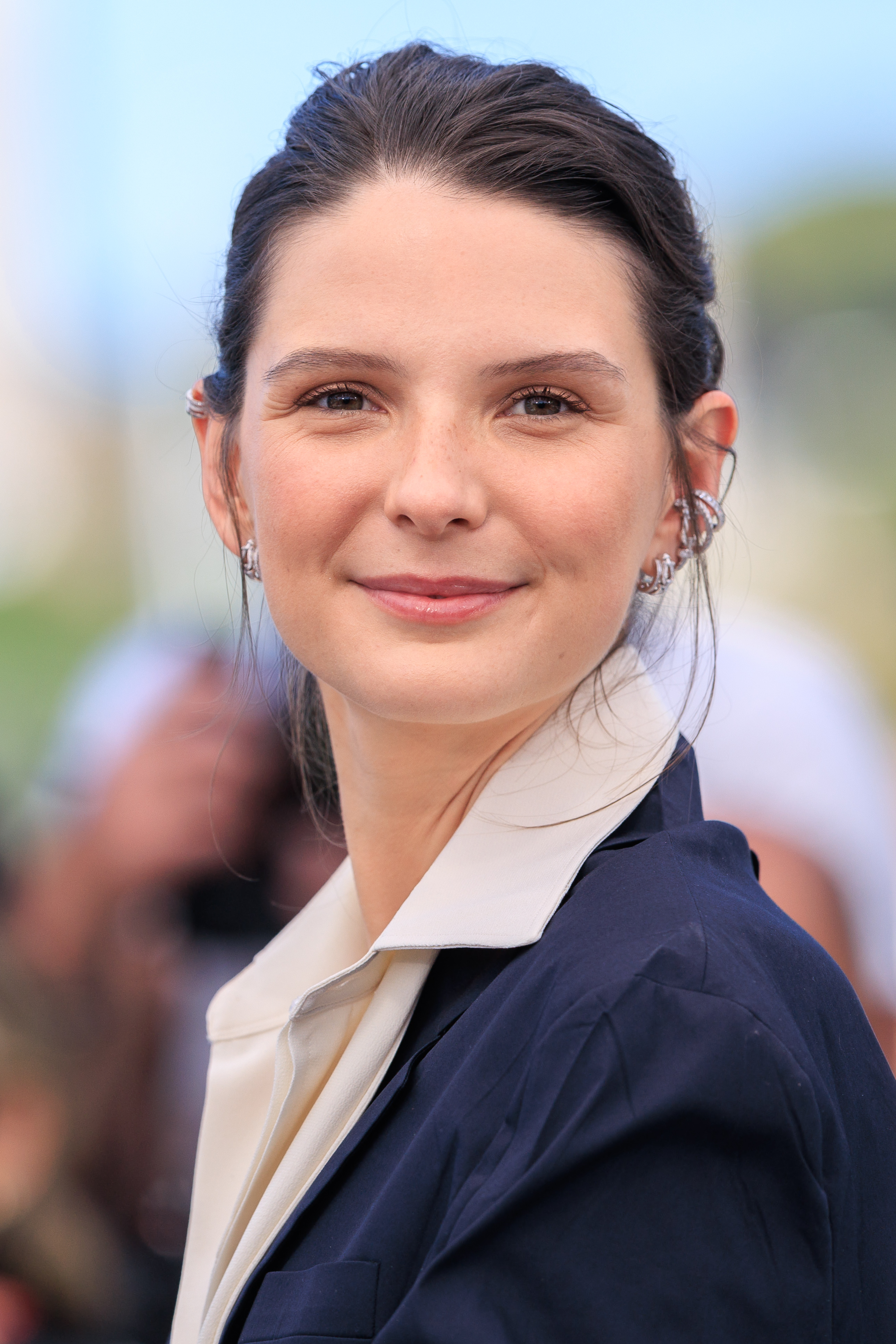
- Japy in 2025
- Born: Joséphine Mahaut Marie Japy; 12 July 1994 (age 32); Paris, France
- Education: Sciences Po Lyon
- Occupation: Actress
- Years active: 2005–present

Joséphine Mahaut Marie Japy (born 12 July 1994) is a French actress. She made her debut in the 2005 film Grey Souls, and has appeared in films such as the comedy Neuilly Yo Mama! (2009) and its sequel Neuilly sa mère, sa mère! (2018), the Claude François biopic My Way (2012) in which she portrayed French singer France Gall, the coming-of-age drama Breathe (2014) – for which she was nominated for the César Award for Most Promising Actress, the romantic comedy Love at Second Sight (2019), the period drama Eugénie Grandet (2021), and the thriller Sur les chemins noirs (2023), as well as the 2024 British Academy Television Award for Best International Programme winning Netflix biographical miniseries Class Act (2023).

== Early life ==
Japy was born in the 17th arrondissement of Paris, France on 12 July 1994.

Japy has a degree in History and a master's degree in sociology from Sciences Po Lyon, a grande école in France.

== Career ==
At the age of 8, Japy decided she wanted to be actress and started taking acting classes. Spotted by a casting director, she asked her photographer uncle to take photos of her that she later slipped into an envelope with the message: "My name is Joséphine, I'm 8 years old, I want to be in the movies." Two days later, the phone rang, the production company was worried because she had not specified her last name, and she had been cast in the 2005 film Grey Souls, directed by Yves Angelo, which marked her acting debut.

Japy credits her encounter with French director Jean-Pierre Jeunet as being decisive in her desire to become an actress. She was auditioning for the role of a child in Jeunet's film A Very Long Engagement (2004) when the director came up to her and standing at her height, said: "Joséphine, can I talk to you like an adult? Today, it won't be you, but one day, we'll meet again...". Japy said that Jeunet's words had a real resonance and made her "want to hang on, believe and keep going", and if Jeunet had not taken the time to say that to her that day, she might not be here [talking to the interviewer].

In 2009, she appeared in the comedy film Neuilly Yo Mama! (2009), and reprised her role 9 years later in the sequel Neuilly sa mère, sa mère! (2018).

In 2011, she starred in the thriller drama film The Monk, an adaptation of Matthew Lewis's 1796 gothic novel of the same name, directed by Dominik Moll.

In 2012, she portrayed French singer France Gall in the Claude François biopic My Way, directed by Florent-Emilio Siri.

In 2014, she played the lead role of Charlie in the coming-of-age drama Breathe, directed by Mélanie Laurent, which was presented in the Critics' Week at the Cannes Film Festival. Her performance in the film earned her a nomination for the César Award for Most Promising Actress and for the Lumière Award for Best Female Revelation.

In 2015, she starred in the dramatic comedy film Paris-Willouby, directed by Arthur Delaire and Quentin Reynaud. In 2016, she starred in the thriller Faultless, directed by Sébastien Marnier.

In 2019, Japy co-starred with François Civil in the romantic comedy film Love at Second Sight, directed by Hugo Gélin.

In 2021, she starred as Eugénie Grandet in the film adaptation of Honoré de Balzac's novel of the same name, directed by Marc Dugain.

In 2023, she starred in the thriller Sur les chemins noirs, directed by Denis Imbert; and portrayed Bernard Tapie's wife, Dominique Damianos, in the Netflix biographical miniseries Class Act.

In September 2024, Japy started filming her directorial debut, The Wonderers. Based on the true story of her younger sister, Bertille, who has a rare genetic disease that leads to autistic behavior, it follows a family navigating the severe disability of the youngest daughter.

== Filmography ==
Year	Title	Role	Notes
2005	Grey Souls	Belle de jour	
2009	Neuilly Yo Mama!	Marie	
2011	The Monk	Antonia	
2012	My Way	France Gall	
2014	Breathe	Charlie	
2014	Un village presque parfait	Directrice régionale de la Poste	
2015	Paris-Willouby	Lucie Guilby	
2016	Faultless	Audrey	
2017	Un de moins	Camille	Short film
2018	Spitak	Madeleine	Short film
2018	Neuilly sa mère, sa mère!	Marie	
2019	Love at Second Sight	Olivia	
2019	L'Échappée	Tess	
2019	Haute Cuisine	Marie	Short film
2021	Les Fantasmes	Claire	
2021	Eugénie Grandet	Eugénie Grandet	
2022	Octave	Anna	Short film
2022	Jack Mimoun et les Secrets de Val Verde	Aurélie Diaz	
2023	Sur les chemins noirs	Anna	
2023	Class Act	Dominique Damianos	TV mini-series
2025	Once Upon My Mother (Ma mère, Dieu et Sylvie Vartan)	Litzie Gozlan	

== Awards and nominations ==
Year	Award / Festival	Category	Work	Result	Ref.
2015	César Awards	Most Promising Actress	Breathe	Nominated	
2015	Lumière Awards	Best Female Revelation	Breathe	Nominated	
2015	Cabourg Film Festival	Female Revelation	Breathe	Won	
2015	FEST International Film Festival	Best Actress (shared with Lou de Laâge)	Breathe	Won	
2015	Prix Romy Schneider	—N/a	Breathe	Nominated	
2024	French Association of Series Critics Awards	Best Supporting Actor	Class Act	Nominated	
