= Booder =

French-Moroccan actor

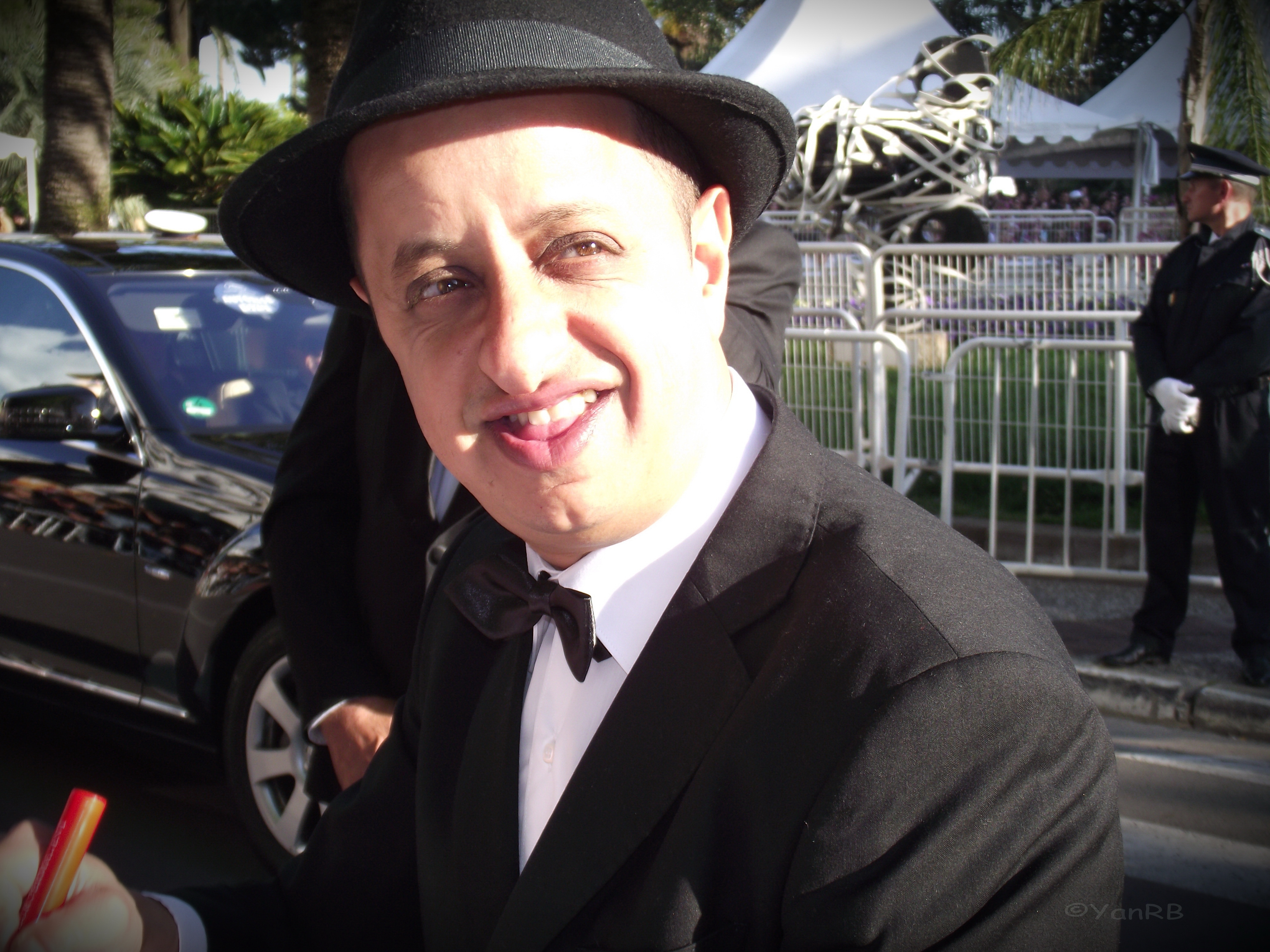
- Booder at the 2011 Cannes Film Festival.
- Born: Mohammed Benyamna; August 13, 1978 (age 48); Bouarfa, Figuig Province, Morocco
- Citizenship: Moroccan, French
- Occupations: Actor, humorist

Mohammed Benyamna better known by his stage name Booder, born August 13, 1978 is a French-Moroccan actor and comedian.

== Life ==
Booder was born in Bouarfa, Morocco. He moved to France in 1979 and grew up in the 10th arrondissement of Paris. He discovered comedy at the theatre club of his high school. After the obtention of a baccalauréat specialized in accounting he decides to change path to go on stage and become a comedian. His stage name is a reference to his favorite footballer, the Moroccan Aziz Bouderbala. He acquired the French nationality by naturalization on 24 June 1999.

== Career ==
At the start of his career, he is part of a trio with two other comedians, without success, he then continues alone. From 2004 he performed in one-man shows in Parisian theatres. He's spotted by producer Rachid Ould-Ali, he was entrusted with the first part of Mouss Diouf's show at the Théâtre du Gymnase Marie Bell, in Paris.

His first appearance in the cinema was in 2003 in a film of François Hanss, named Corps à corps.

In 2011, he played his first major role in Beur sur la ville, written, directed and produced by Djamel Bensalah.

During the On Fridays, Anything Goes of the 8 January 2021, TV show of Arthur in which he is frequently invited, he announces that he published an autobiography called Un bout d'air in 2020 and that he had already sold 10 000 books.

Booder is easily recognizable with his small size, his atypical physique and his hat. Even thought the press sometimes attributed to him the Maroteaux–Lamy syndrome, he states that he doesn't suffer from any genetical disease.

On 1 September 2022, he made his debut as a new member of the radio show Les Grosses Têtes, animated by Laurent Ruquier.

In 2022, with Gaëlle Falzerana he realized his first film, Le Grand Cirque in which he played the first role. The film is released in February 2023 in cinemas.

In 2023, he starred in the play Pour le meilleur et pour le pire, alongside Rebecca Hampton.

== Filmography ==
Year	Original title	English title	Role
2003	Corps à corps	Body to Body	
2005	Bab el web		appearing
2009	Neuilly sa mère !	Neuilly Yo Mama!	Abdelmalik
2009	Je vais te manquer		a policeman
2009	La Marche des crabes		
2010	Opération 118 318, sévices clients		Kader Belkacem
2011	Halal police d'État		the Berber
2011	Beur sur la ville		lieutenant Khalid Belkacem
2012	Un Marocain à Paris		
2016	Pattaya	Good Guys Go to Heaven, Bad Guys Go to Pattaya	the steward
2016	Spatts!		
2017	Ouvert la nuit	Open at Night	the rose seller
2018	Neuilly sa mère, sa mère!	Straight Outta Neuilly	Abdelmalik
2018	Alad'2	The Brand New Adventures of Aladin	
2021	Le Furet		William
2023	Le Grand Cirque		Momo
2024	Le Nounou		Samir

== TV shows ==
Year(s)	Name of the show	TV channel
2010	Ticket pour le soleil	France Ô
2011, 2015 and 2018-2020	Touche pas à mon poste !	France 4 and C8
2011, 2014 and 2020	Fort Boyard	France 2
2014	Jazirat Al Kanz	
Since 2016	On Fridays, Anything Goes with Arthur	TF1
2017	Cache toi-si tu peux	Gulli
2019, 2020	Le Grand Concours	TF1
2020	La Grosse Rigolade	C8
2020	District Z	TF1
2020-2022	Les Touristes	TF1
2020	Tous en cuisine, en direct avec Cyril Lignac	M6
2023	Vendredi, tout est Booder	TF1

== Music clips ==
Year	Song	Artist
2007	Nouveau Français	Amel Bent
2011	La Danse des magiciens	Magic System
2012	Elle t'a maté (Fatoumata)	Keen'V
2017	En chaleur	Ghetto Phénommène feat. Jul
2019	Social	Lartiste

== Theater ==
- 2017 : La grande évasion
- 2019 - 2021 : Booder is back
