= François-Xavier Demaison (actor) =

French actor (born 1973)

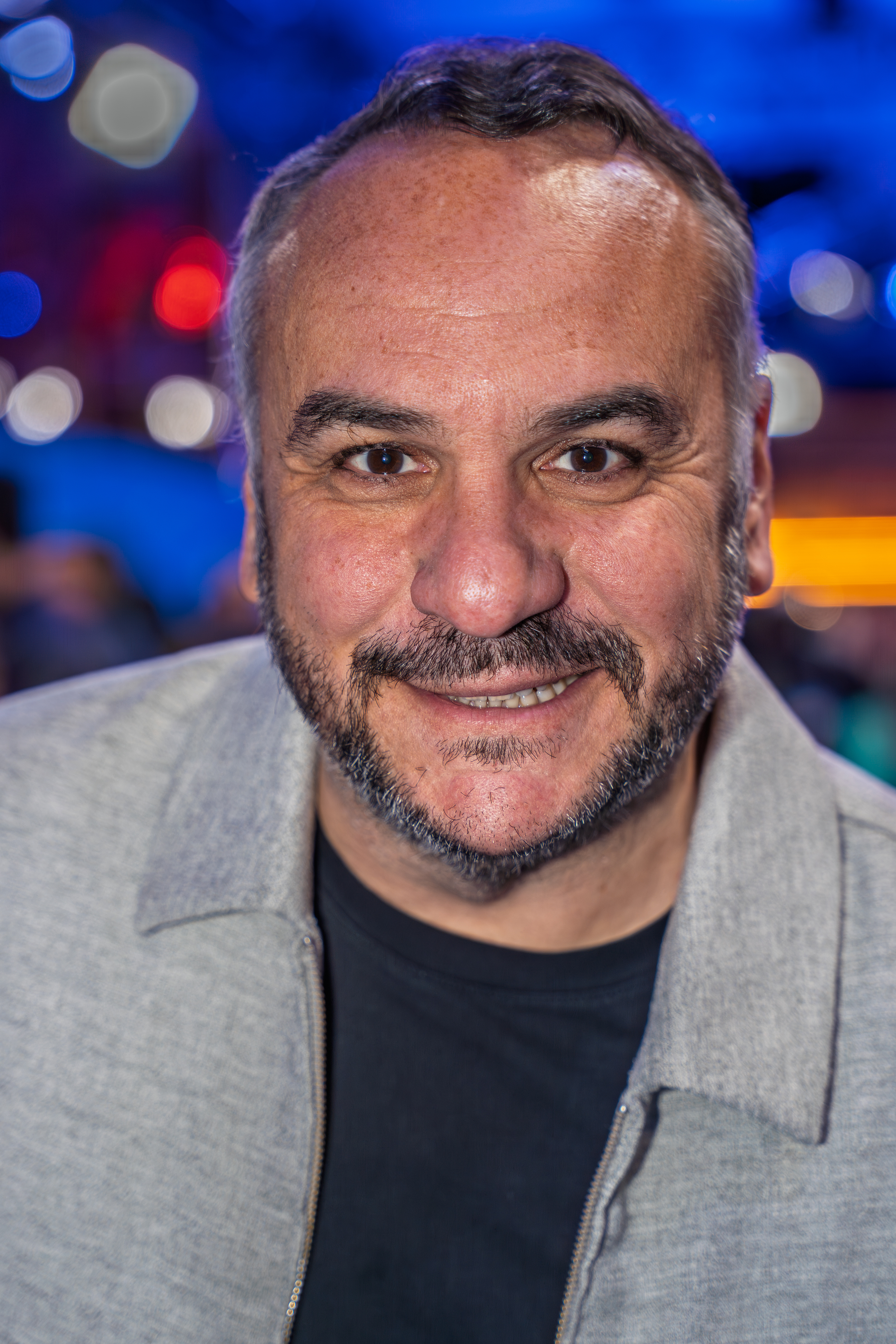
- François-Xavier Demaison at Séries Mania 2026
- Born: 22 September 1973 (age 52); Asnières-sur-Seine, France
- Occupations: Actor, comedian
- Years active: 2002–present
- Children: 1

François-Xavier Demaison (born 22 September 1973) is a French actor and comedian.

== Personal life ==
Demaison was born in Asnières-sur-Seine. Both his parents were lawyers. He studied theater but dropped out to focus on an economics degree. After graduating in 1998 from the Sciences Po in Paris, he began his career as an auditor before joining Landwell & Associés (law firm of PricewaterhouseCoopers PWC) in the field of International taxation.

In August 2001, he was sent on an internship to their New York office. On 11 September 2001, Demaison witnessed the attack on the World Trade Center from his office in Manhattan. After this traumatic event, he decided not to continue on this career path and returned to his first love, the theater. He resumed contact with former teachers who helped him stage his own show, Act Two (he invested his saving of 5000 euros). It opened at the Théâtre du Gymnase Marie Bell in Paris on 2 December 2002.

== Theater ==
Year	Title	Director	Writer(s)	Notes
2002–05	A story pour les gens qui believe in dreams	Éric Théobald	Samuel Le Bihan & Mickaël Quiroga	Théâtre des Mathurins
2007	Demaison s'envole	Éric Théobald (2)	Samuel Le Bihan & Mickaël Quiroga	Casino de Paris
2007	L’Arbre de joie	Christophe Lidon	Louis-Michel Colas & David Khayat	Théâtre de la Gaîté-Montparnasse
2011	Demaison s'évade	Éric Théobald (3)	Samuel Le Bihan & Mickaël Quiroga	Théâtre de la Gaîté-Montparnasse

== Filmography ==
Year	Title	Role	Director	Notes
2005	Olé!	Caron's driver	Florence Quentin	
2005	Tout pour plaire	The realtor	Cécile Telerman	
2006	Sable noir	The server	Samuel Le Bihan	TV series (1 episode)
2007	L'Auberge rouge	Simon Barbeuf	Gérard Krawczyk	
2007	Confidences		Laurent Dussaux	TV mini-series
2008	The First Day of the Rest of Your Life	Doctor Marcaurel	Rémi Bezançon	
2008	Disco	Guillaume Navarre	Fabien Onteniente	
2008	48 heures par jour	TV Host	Catherine Castel	
2008	A Day at the Museum	The head home	Jean-Michel Ribes	
2008	Coluche: l'histoire d'un mec	Coluche	Antoine de Caunes	Nominated - César Award for Best Actor
2008	Ça se soigne?	Philippe Barrois	Laurent Chouchan	
2009	Little Nicholas	Mr. Dubon	Laurent Tirard	
2009	Tellement proches	Jean-Pierre	Éric Toledano and Olivier Nakache	
2009	Neuilly Yo Mama!	Father Dinaro	Gabriel Julien-Laferrière	
2009	Divorces!	Alex	Valérie Guignabodet	
2009	Une place à prendre	The dredger	Charles Meurisse	Short
2009	Réveil d'un mouton	Jonathan Cordiale	Julien Paolini	Short
2010	My Afternoons with Margueritte	Gardini	Jean Becker	
2010	Sans laisser de traces	Patrick Chambon	Grégoire Vigneron	
2011	360	Taxi Driver	Fernando Meirelles	
2011	La Chance de ma vie	Julien Monnier	Nicolas Cuche	
2011	Beur sur la ville	Picolini	Djamel Bensalah	
2011	Émilie Jolie	Voice	Philippe Chatel & Francis Nielsen	
2011	Moi, Michel G., milliardaire, maître du monde	Michel Ganiant	Stéphane Kazandjian	
2011	Nicostratos le pélican	Aristote	Olivier Horlait	
2011	Fais pas ci, fais pas ça	Jean-Pierre Bouley	Gabriel Julien-Laferrière	TV series (1 episode)
2012	Just Like Brothers	Boris	Hugo Gélin	
2012	Zarafa	Malaterre	Jean-Christophe Lie & Rémi Bezançon	
2012	Il était une fois, une fois	Willy Vanderbrook	Christian Merret-Palmair	
2012	L'écharpe rouge	The Boss	Romain Nonn	Short
2013	Paris à tout prix	Thierry	Reem Kherici	
2013–2015	Hubert & Takako	Hubert	Hugo Gittard	TV series (78 episodes)
2014	Nicholas on Holiday	Mr. Dubon	Laurent Tirard	
2015	Trois fois rien		Frédéric Petitjean	Short
2015	The Disappearance	Commandant Bertrand Molina	Charlotte Brandström	TV series (8 episodes)
2016	Arrête ton cinéma	Jack	Diane Kurys	
2016	Team Spirit	Fabien Keller	Christophe Barratier	
2016	La macchinazione	Moreau	David Grieco	
2016	Les têtes de l'emploi	Thierry	Alexandre Charlot & Franck Magnier	
2017	Jour J	Ben	Reem Kherici	
2017	Comment j'ai rencontré mon père	Eliott Berthet	Maxime Motte	
2017	Quadras	Alex	Isabelle Doval & Mélissa Drigeard	TV series (8 episodes)
2018	Neuilly sa mère, sa mère !	Father Dinaro	Gabriel Julien-Laferrière	
2018	Naked Normandy	Thierry Levasseur	Philippe Le Guay	
2018	Tout le monde debout	The priest	Franck Dubosc	
2019	All Inclusive	Michel Goubert	Fabien Onteniente	
2019	Ni une ni deux	Jean-Pierre	Anne Giafferi	
2019	For Sarah	Luc Delmas	Frédéric Berthe	TV series
2020	Divorce Club	Patrick	Michaël Youn	
2020	Connectés	Yann	Romuald Boulanger	
2021	La traque	Yann Declerck	Yves Rénier	TV film
2021	The Time of Secrets	Uncle Jules	Christophe Barratier	
2022	À Mon Tour	Félix de Ponte	Frédéric Berthe	TV film
2022	Men on the Verge of a Nervous Breakdown	Antoine	Audrey Dana	
2022	Champagne	Jean	Nicolas Vanier	
2022	The Sitting Duck	Jean-Pierre Bachmann	Jean-Paul Salomé	
2022	Tous Inconnus	Himself	Nicolas Hourès	TV film
2023	Head in the Clouds	Daniel	Emmanuel Gillibert	
2023	Le nouveau	Alexis	Ludovic Colbeau-Justin	TV film
2023–2025	Le négociateur	Antoine Clerc	Arnauld Mercadier, Vincent Giovanni	TV series
2024	Benoît Gênant Officiel	Lui-même	Eric Lavaine	TV series; 1 episode
2024	Panique au 31	Didier from the storefront	Gaël Leforestier	TV film
2025	Panique au Grand Magasin	FX Sanchez	Julien Bloch	TV film
2025	Un Noël sans fin	Ludovic Berger	Philippe Dajoux	TV film
2026	Good Vibes Only	Serge	Reem Kherici	
2026	Missed Call	Jerome Ricard	Sheree Folkson	TV series
