= The Monk (2011 film) =

- Promotional poster
- Directed by: Dominik Moll
- Screenplay by: Dominik Moll; Anne-Louise Trividic
- Based on: The Monk by Matthew Lewis
- Produced by: Michel Saint-Jean
- Starring: Vincent Cassel; Déborah François; Joséphine Japy; Catherine Mouchet
- Cinematography: Patrick Blossier
- Edited by: François Gédigier; Sylvie Lager
- Music by: Alberto Iglesias
- Distributed by: Diaphana Films (France)
- Release date: 13 July 2011
- Running time: 101 minutes
- Countries: France; Spain
- Language: French
- Budget: €9.8 million
- Box office: US$807,535

The Monk (French: Le Moine) is a 2011 thriller drama film directed by Dominik Moll. It is an adaptation of Matthew Lewis's 1796 gothic novel of the same name, and chronicles the story and downfall of a Capucin Ambrosio (Vincent Cassel), a well-respected monk in Spain. An international co-production between France and Spain, it was partially shot in the barri vell of the city of Girona in Catalonia.

== Plot ==
The film begins with the titular monk, Ambrosio, listening passively to a nameless man's confession of horrific sexual sins, including the rape of his niece. A flashback to Saint Ambrose’s night in December, 1595, shows baby Ambrosio being abandoned at the Capuchin monastery where, despite fearing his birthmark as a sign of the Devil, Ambrosio is adopted and raised by the monks. He joins the monastery at 18 and quickly becomes a renowned preacher within the community. Among the attendees at one of his sermons are Antonia and her Aunt Leonella, who are struck by Ambrosio's eloquence.

Ambrosio confides an odd dream featuring a crimson woman to his mentor, the ailing Father Miguel, who says it was probably the Virgin Mary. The monastery soon gains a new novice, Valerio, brought to the monastery by his godfather Imanol Estevez from Burgos; Valerio wears a mask to hide burns sustained from a house fire.

Separately, wealthy young suitor Don Lorenzo visits sermon attendee Antonia at her home. Antonia's mother Elvire forbids him to marry her daughter until he secures his uncle’s approval.

Father Miguel is convinced something evil has entered the monastery, warning Ambrosio to be wary and alert. After leaving Father Miguel, Ambrosio develops a debilitating headache and goes to his rose garden, where Valerio appears and offers to help, revealing a gift of healing passed down from his mother. Despite Ambrosio's refusal, Valerio heals his headache then leaves.

Later, awakened from a dream, Ambrosio visits the rose garden to find a weeping Valerio. After promising secrecy, Valerio admits he entered the monastery to be closer to Ambrosio, and reveals he is actually a woman called Matilda. She asks for a rose as a parting gift, and while picking one, Ambrosio is bitten by a poisonous centipede. Confined to bed to await sure death, Ambrosio is visited by Matilda while Father Andres, who is keeping watch, is asleep. Matilda sexually assaults Ambrosio but also sucks the poison from his hand, saving his life. He seeks her out when he recovers; while saving Ambrosio has now made her ill, Matilda reveals she can cure herself if Ambrosio allows her to stay. He agrees.

The next morning the body of a monk intending to expose Ambrosio and Valerio's sin is discovered in the rose garden, having been hit by a falling gargoyle. While investigating, Ambrosio sees the woman in crimson from his dream, revealed to be Antonia, asking him to visit her mother. When he arrives, Elvire confesses she had a son before Antonia named Mateo who was killed when she fled Madrid. Later, Ambrosio tries to kiss Antonia following a sermon.

Matilda, who says she knows Ambrosio's true desire is Antonia, offers to help him thwart Antonia's impending marriage to Lorenzo by giving him a sprig of myrtle that will open any locked door and enchant Antonia if she smells it. During the procession of Saint Mary, Ambrosio sneaks into Antonia’s room where, after smelling the flower, she wakes up and they engage in sexual intercourse. At the same time Elvire dreams of her dead son who has the same birthmark on his shoulder as Ambrosio, revealing that Ambrosio is indeed Mateo and thus her son. Waking, Elvire discovers Ambrosio in Antonia's bed; maddened, Ambrosio kills her, but Antonia wakes and Ambrosio is arrested.

Condemned to death by the Inquisition, Ambrosio is visited by Matilda who reveals herself as an instrument of Satan in female form, and tells him someone wants to meet him. The monk is then shown wandering a desolate, rocky desert barefoot and in rags; he collapsed, and the confessor from the beginning approaches, introducing himself as the Devil. He offers Ambrosio an eternity of pleasure for his soul, but Ambrosio demands the deal to be used instead to save Antonia from madness. The Devil agrees and Ambrosio dies.

== Characters ==
Ambrosio is a renowned Monk known for his piety and ability to preach. He was left at the monastery as a baby and raised by the Capuchin monks, taking the vows himself at 18. After meeting Valerio, he commits increasingly heinous crimes against his Catholic vocation and Italian society.

Antonia is a young and innocent woman who first sees Ambrosio preaching and is immediately struck by his moral teachings. She is Elvire's daughter, and Leonella's niece. Antonia becomes engaged to Lorenzo during the film, but is supernaturally seduced by Ambrosio, and loses her mind because of it by the end of the film.

The Devil is disguised as one of Ambrosio's confessors who often frequents the monastery to hear his preaching. He appears in the opening scene, a scene where Ambrosio is preaching, and at the end where he reveals himself to be supernatural when he meets Ambrosio in the desert and offers him safety in return for his soul.

Elvire is Antonia's ill mother who lives with her daughter and sister in Madrid. She married the son of the wealthy Las Cisternas family, leading to his disinheritance and his eventual disdain of her. After his death, she moved her daughter to Madrid and wishes her to marry in her station to avoid her life path. It is revealed that Ambrosio is her son after she confesses to having had a first born son with a hand mark that she deserted when fleeing her husband's angry father. She is killed by Ambrosio with scissors when she discovers he and Antonia naked in bed together.

Father Andres is the older monk who acts as a physician in the Capuchin monastery. He tries to heal Ambrosio after he is bitten by the poisonous centipede in the rose garden.

Father Miguel is the monk who found Ambrosio outside of the Capuchin monastery when he was left. He acts as a confidant to Ambrosio before he dies in Ambrosio's arms warning him of evil.

Leonella is Antonia's aunt and Elvire's sister who is often chaperoning Antonia.

Lorenzo is Antonia's suitor from the wealthy Medina family. He spends the film getting permission to marry Antonia from her mother and his uncle and serenading Antonia outside of her window.

Valerio is a demon who presents itself first as the burned and masked Valerio, then the seductive temptress who heals Ambrosio, seduces him, and helps him gain access to Antonia.

== Cast ==
- Vincent Cassel as Capucino Ambrosio
- Déborah François as Valerio
- Joséphine Japy as Antonia
- Catherine Mouchet as Elvire
- Geraldine Chaplin as l'abbesse
- Sergi López as The Devil
- Jordi Dauder as Père Miguel
- Roxane Duran as Sœur Agnès
- Frédéric Noaille as Lorenzo
- Javivi as Frère Andrés

== Differences between the book and the film ==
- Structure and character focus
  - The book’s focus is more scattered as readers are introduced to multiple characters facing barriers to their happiness set up by the Catholic institution of Spain, while the film moves away from this broad cast of characters to focus solely on Ambrosio’s storyline. The characters that remain in this film adaptation are directly related to him.
- Valerio (Rosario/Matilda)
  - Valerio is the only name given to the female temptress that sneaks into the monastery to get close to Ambrosio. In the novel, the woman is named Matilda and she uses the name Rosario when she is masquerading as a novice.
  - In the film, she wears a mask that is never described in the book, perhaps partly to make it more realistic that she could hide in the monastery. The blank open-mouthed mask makes the character more sinister initially and foreshadows her nefarious intentions. Valerio is also never explicitly called a demon temptress sent by Satan like in the novel, where the Devil claims her as his design.
  - In the film, Valerio sexually assaults Ambrosio, which is not in the novel. In the novel, his first sexual experience is of his own free will and fully conscious, even though he is disturbed and heavily influenced by Matilda’s reasoning. In the film’s scene where she is sucking out the poison from his hand, there is also a montage of sexual intercourse between the two, but Ambrosio is ill and mostly unconscious. He also later questions her about what happened, further demonstrating that he did not consent or know what was happening, whereas he does not have this sexual trauma in the novel.
- Antonia’s fate
  - In the film, she is not explicitly raped, instead she is influenced with a sprig of myrtle that is supernaturally enhanced, resulting in intercourse.
  - In the novel, Ambrosio later drugs Antonia and takes her to a crypt where he rapes her and then murders her as she is escaping. This is fully cut from the film.
  - She is not killed at Ambrosio's hand, but instead goes mad, which is not even shown but told to Ambrosio (and the audience) by the Devil.
  - Ambrosio bargains for Antonia’s soul at the end of the movie, whereas he was only concerned with himself in the novel, especially by the end when he is on the brink of being killed.
- Agnes
  - In the film, she dies with her baby and haunts Ambrosio once as a ghost.
  - She lives in the novel and has a much richer backstory and a happy ending where she ends up with Raymond (Cristobal in the film).
  - The film shows her, but only to emphasize Ambrosio’s previous piety and insistence on following the rules and showing no mercy for sins that he later commits himself.
  - Her whole back story and connection with her brother, Lorenzo, is not described in the film.
- The Devil
  - Only appears as a human in the film.
  - He appears in the first scene, making his presence known but not clear. His confession acts as an interesting beginning to the film as it shows how Ambrosio reacts to the horrific sins with no facial expressions and no judgement, even as he describes incest and sexual assault on a niece.
- Elvire’s murder
  - In the novel he strangles his mother and gets away with the crime for a time, able to continue to scheme with Matilda (Valerio) about how to gain access to Antonia.
  - In the film, he stabs Elvire and is caught red-handed. This is where he is captured, and he is then immediately shown on trial.
- A serpent, not centipede, bites Ambrosio in the rose garden.
  - In Lewis’ novel, a serpent bites Ambrosio, making an obvious connection to the Biblical story of Satan disguised as a serpent in the Garden of Eden.
  - Moll’s adaptation features a centipede biting and poisoning Ambrosio.
- Death of the accusatory friar
  - This scene is not in the novel at all. No other monks suspect Ambrosio at any point.
  - It adds another bloody crime to the internal and previously just sexual crimes committed in the monastery. Or it was supernatural intervention to help Ambrosio and Valerio, either way it is only in the movie.
- No familial connections outside of Ambrosio/Elvire/Antonia are discussed.
  - In the novel, Lorenzo is Agnes’ brother.
  - Agnes is in love and trying to run away with Lorenzo’s friend Raymond (Cristobal in the film).

== Production ==
The film was announced in February 2010, with shooting scheduled for 12 weeks in April 2010. The film released in France on July 13 2011, and in the UK on April 27 2012.

== Reception ==
Review aggregation website Rotten Tomatoes gives it a 63% approval rating, based on 35 reviews, with an average score of 5.8/10. Its consensus reads, "Visually sharp but only occasionally gripping, The Monk is still watchable thanks in part to Vincent Cassel's charismatic performance." At Metacritic, which assigns a normalized rating out of 100 to reviews from mainstream critics, the film received an average score of 56, based on 12 reviews, indicating "mixed or average reviews".

Screen Daily praised the leading man, "Cassel exudes otherworldly gravitas and his singular looks are perfect for the role." The review continued to note that "Moll uses quaint touches like iris in/iris out and, via painterly photography, makes the most of the contrast between the cool inner sanctum and the sun-baked landscape." Although the reviewer felt that "three quarters of the film are delectably creepy", the finale only "peters out".
