= Neuilly sa mère, sa mère! =

Neuilly sa mère, sa mère !
- Film poster
- Directed by: Gabriel Julien-Laferrière
- Written by: Djamel Bensalah; Marc de Chauveron; Isaac Sharry
- Produced by: Djamel Bensalah; Isaac Sharry
- Starring: Denis Podalydès; Samy Seghir; Jérémy Denisty; Sophia Aram; Joséphine Japy
- Edited by: Jean-François Elie; Vincent Trisolini
- Music by: Charlie Nguyen Kim
- Production companies: Miroir Magique ! Vito Films
- Distributed by: SND Films
- Release date: 8 August 2018
- Country: France
- Language: French
- Budget: $8.2 million
- Box office: $9 million

Neuilly sa mère, sa mère! (pronounced [nøji sa mɛʁ sa mɛʁ]), also known as Neuilly sa mère! 2, is a 2018 French comedy film directed by Gabriel Julien-Laferrière. This is the sequel of Neuilly Yo Mama! released in 2009.

UniFrance shows the English title Straight Outta Neuilly.

== Plot ==
In 2008, Sami Benboudaoud discovered the hell of Neuilly-sur-Seine, Paris Region.

10 years later, while everything is going well for Sami, who brilliantly finishes his studies in political science, nothing is going well for his cousin Charles de Chazelle. Since the defeat of his idol Nicolas Sarkozy in the presidential elections, he has fallen into a deep depression when his family loses all their fortune and has to leave Neuilly. Rejected by all, the Chazelle find refuge at Sami in Nanterre. From then on, for Sami and the inhabitants of his city, life will never be a long calm river again.

== Cast ==
- Denis Podalydès : Stanislas de Chazelle
- Samy Seghir : Sami Benboudaoud
- Jérémy Denisty : Charles de Chazelle
- Sophia Aram : Djamila
- Joséphine Japy : Marie
- Julien Courbey : Jérôme
- Booder : Malik
- Steve Tran : Tran
- Chloé Coulloud : Caroline
- Valérie Lemercier : Brigitte
- François-Xavier Demaison : Father Dinaro
- Josiane Balasko : Madame Bachelot
- Élie Semoun : Tapiro
- Jackie Berroyer : Ricoeur
- Laurent Gamelon : Patrick Daubra
- Biyouna : Fatima
- Farida Khelfa : Nadia Benboudaoud
- Arnaud Montebourg : Himself
- Julien Dray : Himself
- Éric Dupond-Moretti : Himself
- Yann Barthès : Himself

== Production ==
Principal photography on the film began on October 3, 2017, and lasted til the end of the year.
