= Instructions Not Included =

- American theatrical release poster
- Directed by: Eugenio Derbez
- Written by: Guillermo Ríos; Leticia López Margalli; Eugenio Derbez
- Story by: Guillermo Ríos; Leticia López Margalli
- Produced by: Mónica Lozano; Eugenio Derbez
- Starring: Eugenio Derbez; Jessica Lindsey; Loreto Peralta; Daniel Raymont; Alessandra Rosaldo; Hugo Stiglitz; Arcelia Ramírez
- Cinematography: Martín Boege; Andrés León Becker
- Edited by: Eugenio Derbez; Santiago Pérez Rocha León
- Music by: Carlo Siliotto
- Production companies: Alebrije Cine y Video; Fulano, Mengano y Asociados
- Distributed by: Pantelion Films
- Release dates: August 30, 2013 (United States); September 20, 2013 (Mexico)
- Running time: 122 minutes
- Country: Mexico
- Languages: Spanish; English
- Budget: $5 million
- Box office: $100.5 million

Instructions Not Included (Spanish: No se aceptan devoluciones, lit. 'Returns not accepted') is a 2013 Mexican comedy-drama film directed, co-written, co-produced by, and starring Eugenio Derbez. The plot follows a Mexican playboy who is suddenly saddled with a love child at his doorstep, and sets off to Los Angeles to find the mother. Released in the United States on August 30, 2013, the film received mixed reviews and grossed $100 million worldwide, making it the highest-grossing Mexican film.

== Plot ==
Valentín Bravo had always been a rather fearful child, afraid of everything from heights to spiders. His father, Juan "Johnny" Bravo, raised him trying to make him fearless by making a tarantula walk on Valentin and throwing him off a high oceanside cliff known as La Quebrada. Valentín grows up to be Acapulco's local playboy and sleeps with every tourist that crosses his path. One day a former fling named Julie shows up at his doorstep with a baby girl, Maggie, claiming that she is his daughter. Julie leaves the baby with Valentín after asking him for cab fare, but she does not come back.

Valentín leaves Acapulco with Maggie and hitchhikes across Mexico and into the United States. Going only by a single photo of Julie in which a Los Angeles hotel is visible in the background, Valentín visits the hotel to track down Julie. However, when Maggie wanders to a nearby pool, Valentín ends up jumping out of the presidential suite into the pool ten stories below, rescuing his daughter. A movie director witnesses this event and hires Valentín as a stuntman — a job which Valentín accepts since he believes it is the only way he can support Maggie.

An unlikely father figure, Valentín raises Maggie for six years, giving her a happy, fun, and carefree home. Meanwhile, he also establishes himself as one of Hollywood's top stuntmen to pay the bills, with Maggie acting as his on-set translator as Valentín still does not know any English. Meanwhile, during a visit to the doctor in which he receives an injection, the doctor confides in Valentín — with Maggie out of earshot — that the treatments are not working.

To hide from Maggie the fact that her mother abandoned her, Valentín writes weekly letters to Maggie from her, detailing various adventures and feats around the world to explain her absence. Eventually, Valentín gets a call from Julie saying that she is in Los Angeles and wants to meet. Julie, who now lives in New York City, tries to be a part of Maggie's life again. After a tearful departure at the airport, Julie realizes she does not want to just see Maggie during visits and holidays. She files for custody and cites Valentín's dangerous job and lack of English skills as reasons that he is unfit to raise Maggie. Valentín's sincerity convince the judge that he has Maggie's best interest at heart, and he awards custody to Valentin as he is the only parent she has really known.

Not backing down however, Julie asks for a DNA test which ends up proving that Valentín is not the father after all. Valentín ends up losing legal custody of Maggie, but they sneak away and decide to go back to Acapulco where he reunites with his friends, although he discovers that his father died a few years earlier.

Julie threatens Valentín's director into revealing Valentín's location, who repeatedly claims he does not know where the father and daughter are. Eventually he relents and states that Valentín has woken up every day not knowing if it would be the last day he would see his daughter, but the details are not revealed on-screen. Julie finds Valentín and Maggie on the beach and has surprisingly dropped her attempts to gain custody. Instead, the three enjoy time together as a family in Acapulco while in a voice-over Valentín narrates how doctors can sometimes discover a heart defect for which there is no cure and which could kill the patient any time. As Valentín and Julie sit on the beach with Maggie falling asleep in Valentín's lap, Maggie peacefully passes away, which reveals that she, not Valentín, was the one with the heart defect.

One year later, Valentín is seen walking down the beach, with a dog but without Julie. Valentin now understands his father's motives in wanting to give him the courage to face his fears by preparing him to meet them, and expresses gratitude to Maggie for teaching him to face life without being ready. The film ends with a vision of Maggie playing in heaven with her grandfather, while Valentin concludes that even in their absence, his father and daughter continue to teach him how to face life.

== Cast ==
- Eugenio Derbez as Valentín Bravo
- Jessica Lindsey as Julie Weston
- Loreto Peralta as Maggie Bravo
- Daniel Raymont as Frank Ryan
- Alessandra Rosaldo as Renée
- Hugo Stiglitz as Johnny Bravo
- Sammy Pérez as Sammy
- Arcelia Ramírez as Judeisy
- Agustín Bernal as Lupe
- Rosa Gloria Chagoyán as Lola
- Karla Souza as Jackie
- Margarita Wynne as Sofía
- Arap Bethke as Valentín's Lawyer
- Alejandra Bogue as Travesti
- Danny Lopez as Johnny Depp/Aztec man
- Rodrigo Massa as FBI Agent
- Roger Cudney as Julie's lawyer

== Reception ==
=== Box office ===
Instructions Not Included grossed $7.8 million from 347 theaters in its opening weekend in the United States, making it the fifth highest-grossing film of the 2013 Labor Day weekend. The film "shattered box office records" and became the "highest-grossing Spanish-language film to open in North America," and by the second weekend the number of theaters showing the film doubled. By the end of its run, it grossed $44.5 million in North America, making it the highest-grossing Spanish-language film and the fourth highest-grossing foreign film all time in United States, along with grossing a total of $100.5 million worldwide.

In Mexico, the film has a record-breaking $11.52 million from 2,755 screens on its opening weekend, making it the highest-grossing opening for a Mexican film of all time, doubling the record set by El Crimen del Padre Amaro of $5.5 million. In the second week it got around $9.4 million to retrieve the first place, accumulating around $27 million and making itself the highest-grossing Mexican film of all time by breaking the records of 2013 film Nosotros los Nobles of $26.3 million.

At the end of 2013, Instructions Not Included ended with a sum of $46.1 million, consolidating as the third highest-grossing movie of the year in Mexico, just below Despicable Me 2 and Iron Man 3.

=== Critical response ===
On review aggregator website Rotten Tomatoes, the film holds an approval rating of 57% based on 21 reviews, and an average rating of 6/10. On Metacritic, the film has a weighted average score of 55 out of 100, based on 5 critics, indicating "mixed or average reviews". Audiences polled by CinemaScore gave the film a rare "A+" grade.

Joe Leydon of Variety described Instructions Not Included as "sporadically amusing but unduly protracted." He also wrote: "Derbez and Peralta develop a sweetly effective chemistry in their scenes together ... Unfortunately, the supporting players are all too often encouraged to overplay, with decidedly mixed results."

=== Accolades ===
Year	Award	Category	Recipients	Result	Ref.
2013	People's Choice Awards	Favorite Comedic Movie		Nominated	
2014	Young Artist Award	Best Leading Young Actress in a Feature Film	Loreto Peralta	Won	
2014	Young Artist Award	Best Supporting Young Actress in a Feature Film	Laura Krystine	Nominated	

== Remakes ==
In 2016, a French remake of the film titled Two Is a Family (Demain Tout Commence) was released. The film was directed by Hugo Gélin and stars Omar Sy in the role originally played by Derbez. In the same year, a Turkish remake of the film titled You Are My Everything (Sen Benim Her Şeyimsin) was released. The film was directed by Tolga Örnek and stars Tolga Çevik in the role originally played by Derbez. A Brazilian remake directed by André Moraes, titled No Returns Accepted (Não Se Aceitam Devoluções), was released on May 31, 2018. The movie stars Leandro Hassum as the lead character. A Philippine remake directed by Crisanto B. Aquino, titled Instant Daddy released on October 11, 2023. The movie stars Ryza Cenon, Althea Ruedas, and Jerald Napoles. A Spanish remake, Babies Don't Come with Instructions (Sin instrucciones), was released on 25 December 2024.
