= Breathe (2014 film) =

- Theatrical release poster
- French: Respire
- Directed by: Mélanie Laurent
- Screenplay by: Mélanie Laurent; Julien Lambroschini
- Based on: Respire by Anne-Sophie Brasme
- Produced by: Bruno Levy
- Starring: Joséphine Japy; Lou de Laâge; Isabelle Carré; Claire Keim; Rasha Bukvic; Roxane Duran; Thomas Solivéres; Louka Meliava; Camille Claris; Fanny Sidney; Louise Grinberg
- Cinematography: Arnaud Potier
- Edited by: Guerric Catala
- Music by: Marc Chouarain
- Production companies: Move Movie; Gaumont; Mely Productions
- Distributed by: Gaumont
- Release dates: 17 May 2014 (Cannes); 12 November 2014 (France)
- Running time: 91 minutes
- Country: France
- Language: French
- Budget: €3.4 million
- Box office: $1.1 million

Breathe (French: Respire) is a 2014 French coming-of-age drama film directed by Mélanie Laurent, based on the novel of the same name by Anne-Sophie Brasme. The film stars Joséphine Japy, Lou de Laâge and Isabelle Carré. It was screened in the Critics' Week section at the 2014 Cannes Film Festival. It was also screened in the Contemporary World Cinema section at the 2014 Toronto International Film Festival. In January 2015, the film received three nominations at the 20th Lumière Awards and also two nominations at the 40th César Awards.

== Plot ==
Charlie is a teenage high school student whose parents are breaking up. At school she is assigned to take care of new student Sarah, a white girl who has recently moved from Nigeria, where her mother works for a charity, to live with her aunt. The two quickly become inseparable. During All Saints' Day Sarah tells Charlie that her mother is unable to visit and she'll be alone. Charlie invites Sarah to spend time with her mother and her mother's friends for the holiday.

Sarah's attitude towards Charlie abruptly changes when they are on vacation when Charlie introduces Sarah as a classmate and not as a friend. Sarah then alternates between being warm to Charlie and being cold and freezing her out. When they return from their vacation Sarah ignores Charlie and Charlie practices asking her what is wrong when she sees her at school. However, when Sarah gets to school Charlie warmly embraces her acting as though nothing is wrong.

Charlie continues to grow suspicious of Sarah and the way she acts. In front of their group of friends she points out inconsistencies in Sarah's stories about her mother. Sarah casually threatens to tell Charlie's friends about her abusive father, which Charlie confided to her in secret. In order to find out the truth about Sarah, Charlie follows her home from school where she learns she lives in a rough part of town with her alcoholic mother.

At a New Year's party Charlie tells Sarah that she saw her mother and that she, Sarah, isn't really mean. Sarah threatens to kill her if she tells anyone, and the two stop being friendly. After Charlie hears Sarah telling another one of their friends that Charlie never lost her virginity with her ex Lucas because she cried too much, she threatens to tell everyone about Sarah's mother. In retaliation Sarah graffitis "Charlie is a whore" all over the school. Though her friends try to rally around her, Charlie does nothing to stop Sarah's abuse.

Eventually Sarah shows up at Charlie's house crying because her mother hit her and she felt she had nowhere else to go. Charlie readily forgives her, telling her that she is only upset when they're apart. However, the next day at school Sarah once again ignores her, even giving a necklace she was given by Charlie's mom to another girl as a present. Charlie lashes out by attacking the girl.

Sarah comes by Charlie's place to collect her things after school is out for the summer. They sit on Charlie's bed, and Sarah taunts Charlie by saying that Charlie is an abuser playing a victim. Sarah tells Charlie that she plans to move to Paris with another friend to attend college while Charlie will be stuck in their small town for the rest of her life. Charlie cracks and pushes Sarah, who hits her head on a drawer. Sarah climbs back up and falls back onto the bed and begins laughing. Enraged and extremely distraught, Charlie suffocates her with a pillow.

When Charlie's mother returns home, Charlie cries an apology, telling her mother that "She is upstairs," before having a panic attack. Her mother goes upstairs and screams upon finding Sarah's body. Charlie manages to slow down her breathing and looks directly into the camera before it cuts to black.

== Cast ==
- Joséphine Japy as Charlie
- Lou de Laâge as Sarah
- Isabelle Carré as Vanessa
- Claire Keim as Laura
- Roxane Duran as Victoire
- Fanny Sidney as Isa
- Carole Franck as Sarah's mother
- Marie Denarnaud as Marie
- Thomas Solivéres as Gastine
- Camille Claris as Delphine
- Alejandro Albarracín as Esteban
- Radivoje Bukvic as Charlie's father
- Louka Meliava as Lucas
- Louise Grinberg as Louise
- Anne Marivin

== Production ==
Filming took place in Béziers from 25 November 2013 to January 2014.

== Reception ==
On the review aggregator Rotten Tomatoes, the film has a rating of 93% positive reviews, based on 45 reviews, with an average rating of 7.7/10. The site's critical consensus reads, "Breathe finds writer-director Mélanie Laurent opening a sensitive, well-acted window into the bittersweet upheaval of adolescence." Metacritic gives the film a rating of 78 out of 100, based on 17 critics, indicating "generally favorable reviews".
