= Samy Seghir =

French actor (born 1994)

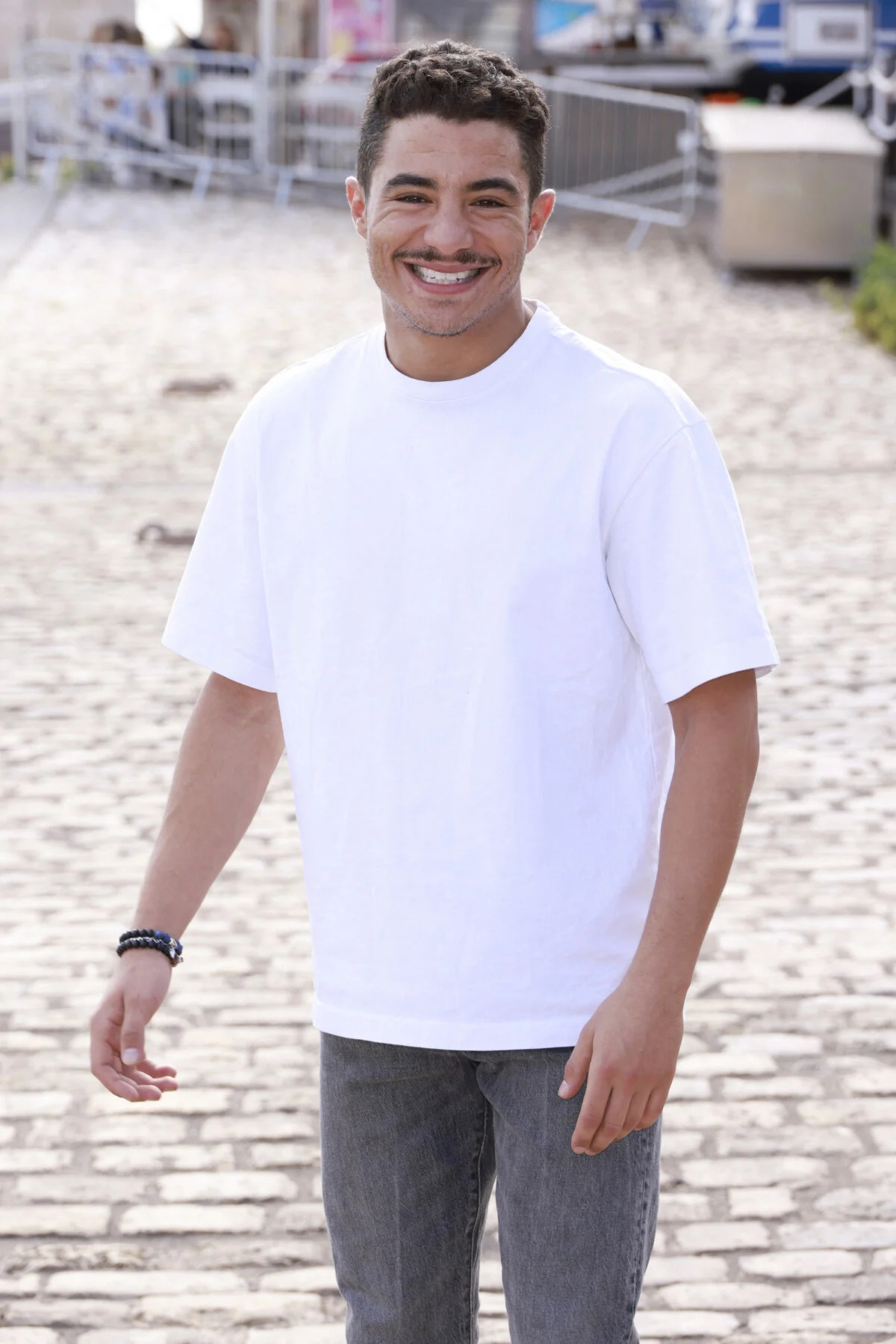
- Samy Seghir in 2022
- Born: 29 July 1994 (age 32); Saint-Denis, Seine-Saint-Denis, France
- Occupation: Actor
- Years active: 2006–present

Samy Seghir (Arabic: سامي صغير; born 29 July 1994) is a French actor of Algerian descent.

== Biography ==
From an Algerian family, Samy began his career in 2006, when his mother replied to an advertisement in a local newspaper, Aubermensuel. He participated in the audition for Michou d'Auber and was noticed by producer Luc Besson. Living in Émile-Dubois, like the character he was playing, Messaoud, Samy starred in this historic film alongside Gérard Depardieu and Nathalie Baye.

In 2006, he starred in a TV movie, Harkis, notably with Smaïn. In 2007, he also starred in Big City, a film by Djamel Bensalah.

In 2009, he won the lead role in Neuilly sa mère !, which was the result of his previous collaboration with Djamel Bensalah, the producer. Samy Seghir presented an award at the NRJ Music Awards on 23 January 2010, alongside Maxime Godart and Victoria Silvstedt.

He was part of the last fifteen contenders for a César Award, for the Most Promising Newcomer. In the end, he was not on the list of the final five nominees.

In the spring of 2010, he starred in Alain Tasma's TV movie Fracture, inspired by the book Ils sont votre épouvante et vous êtes leur crainte by Thierry Jonquet, with Leïla Bekhti and Anaïs Demoustier.

On 28 May 2011, he made an appearance in the music video "L'insécurité" by French rapper, Seyfu.

Nine years later, Samy Seghir again has the main role of Neuilly sa mère, sa mère !

=== Film ===
- 2006 : Bonne nuit Malik: Bilal
- 2007 : Michou d'Auber: Messaoud / Michou
- 2007 : Big City: Wapiti
- 2009 : Neuilly sa mère !: Sami Benboudaoud
- 2009 : Des livres et moi: Samy
- 2011 : Beur sur la ville: Trainee policeman Samy
- 2011 : Nuit Blanche: Thomas
- 2011 : Un temps d'avance: Samy
- 2013 : The Dream Kids: Selim
- 2013 : Turning Tide: Mano Ixa
- 2016 : Le Bureau des Légendes: Yacim Boumaza
- 2018 : Neuilly sa mère, sa mère! : Sami Benboudaoud
- 2020 : Earth and Blood : Yanis

=== Television ===
- 2006 : Harkis: Kader
- 2009 : Les Bleus, premiers pas dans la police (Season 2, Episode 1): Abdel
- 2010 : Fracture : Lakhdar
