= Hubert & Takako =

French TV series

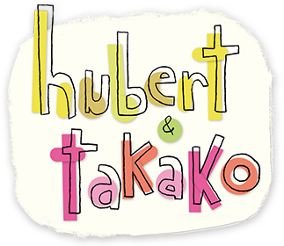
- Genre: Animated comedy
- Created by: Hugo Gittard
- Directed by: Hugo Gittard
- Voices of: François-Xavier Demaison; Charlotte Le Bon; Marie-Laure Dougnac; Ariane Aggiage; Jérémy Prévost; Stéphane Ronchewski; Guillaume Orsat
- Theme music composer: Vincent Artaud
- Composer: Franck Agulhon
- Country of origin: France
- Original languages: French; English
- No. of episodes: 78

Production
- Executive producers: Marc du Pontavice; For Inspidea: CJ See; For Caribara: Olivier Duval; For Toutenkartoon Canada: Laurent Donnay
- Producer: Marc du Pontavice
- Editor: Amélie Degouys
- Running time: 7 minutes
- Production company: Xilam Animation

Original release
- Network: Gulli; Canal+ Canal J
- Release: 3 November 2013 – 18 January 2015

Hubert & Takako (known as Hubert et Takako in French) is a French animated comedy series which was produced by Marc du Pontavice at Xilam, created and directed by Hugo Gittard, with the participation of Canal+, Gulli and Canal J, in association with A Plus Image 3 and Cofanim-Backup Media, and premiered in France on 3 November 2013 on Canal+. 78 episodes of 7 minutes were produced. The opening sequence was composed by Vincent Artaud.

== Synopsis ==
Just about any pig would adapt pretty easily to the presence of a fly, but for Hubert, who aspires to becoming the archetype of the modern, clean-cut guy, Takako is messing up his plans. This out-of-control fly is that little glitch in Hubert's well-oiled cogs. She accepts him just the way he is.

== Characters ==
- Hubert (François-Xavier Demaison (French); Joe Ochman (English) (credited as B.J. Oakie) is a sensitive, cultivated, hypochondriacal, nearly blusterous pig with a huge ego to maintain. To get over his many self-doubts, unrequited crush on Jennifer and low self-esteem, he acts arrogantly and often uses his persona as a "clean-cut, modern, sophisticated" individual to belittle Takako for not being on the same level as him, in spite of being far more immature and high-strung. Hubert is also something of a hypocrite at times, scolding Takako sharply for engaging in an activity he perceives as unruly, then secretly pursuing the same later on, or going behind her back for the sake of short-term gratification. In spite of his numerous vices, he does ultimately have a good heart and will usually do the right thing, sufficiently motivated or not.
- Takako (Charlotte Le Bon (French); Marieve Herington (English) (credited as Lindsay Torrence), in sharp contrast, is a peppy, enthusiastic, caring, yet sarcastic, rambunctious and occasionally flirtatious fly with something of a problem when it comes to reading the room. She's much goofier than Hubert at even his most overdramatic and exaggerated, often becoming in over her head or suggesting absurd courses of action to resolve minor inconveniences or merely because irritating Hubert garners her joy. In spite of her laziness and lack of adult maturity, she is often the more functional of the two, having to curb or eliminate Hubert's obsessive-compulsive tendencies in cases where they become too out of hand. Though she has a love for messing with Hubert even if he isn't doing something worthy of her biting wit (sometimes to sadistic degrees), she is fond of him and generally means him no real harm. She is accompanied in a handful of episodes by her other close friends, Katie and Nat, and together the three form the (humorously ironically-named) rock band the Flyswatters.

== Episodes ==
No.	Title	Written by	Storyboarded by	Original release date
1	"Fresh Air? Who Cares?" "Ras le bol d'air"	Hugo Gittard	Hugo Gittard	3 November 2013
2	"Baby-Sister" "Tata Takako"	Hugo Gittard	Adrien Muller	3 November 2013
Takako's three nephews are entrusted to her care for the day. Hubert and Takako up the anty with their kiddy activities, and pretty soon, run the risk of becoming even more immature than the kids themselves. So who's the coolest, uncle or aunt?
3	"A Star is Born" "Star de Pub"	Hugo Gittard	Gaël Le Gourrierec	3 November 2013
Hubert and Takako are in seventh heaven: an advertising agency is going to shoot an ad for a brand of potato chips in their house! The two friends are convinced they've got a future in showbiz. But during the shoot, Takako can't keep her trap shut.
4	"The Invincible Pig" "Le Cochon Invisible"	Jean-Marc Lenglen	Adrien Muller	10 November 2013
5	"Something Fishy" "Mystère à la Clé"	Jean-Marc Lenglen	Céline Gobinet	10 November 2013
6	"Space Cucumber" "Concombre de l'espace"	Hugo Gittard	Hugo Gittard	10 November 2013
7	"Vote for Takako" "Votez Takako"	Hugo Gittard	Florent Remize	17 November 2013
8	"Five Minutes of Fame" "Question pour un Cochon"	Jean-Marc Lenglen	Gaël Le Gourrierec	17 November 2013
9	"Pajama Party" "Soirée Pyjama"	Fabien Limousin	Adrien Muller	17 November 2013
10	"Pig Tears" "Larmes de Cochon"	Jean-Marc Lenglen	Céline Gobinet	24 November 2013
11	"Takako, Are You Asleep?" "Takako, tu Dors ?"	Hugo Gittard	Hugo Gittard	24 November 2013
12	"Scary Critters" "Les Petites Bêtes ne mangent pas les Grosses"	Jean-Marc Lenglen	Cédric Dietsch	24 November 2013
13	"Paws Off My Ravioli" "Touche pas à mes Raviolis!"	Cédric Stéphan	Adrien Muller	1 December 2013
14–15	"One for Three and Three for All" "Oh les amoureux !"	Hugo Gittard	Cédric Dietsch	1 December 2013
16	"Friendly Vampires" "Hubert a les crocs"	Hugo Gittard	Gaël Le Gourrierec	8 December 2013
17	"Pepperoni and Brains" "La Science des Pizzas"	Jean-Marc Lenglen	Adrien Muller	8 December 2013
18	"Secret Agent Hubert" "Un Agent très Spécial"	Eldiablo; Emmanuel Leduc	Oliver Pouchelon	8 December 2013
19	"Couch Potato Traveler" "L'aventure en Pantoufles"	Hugo Gittard	Andrès Fernandez; Fred Mintoff	15 December 2013
20	"Clean Freak" "Le Fou du Ménage"	Cédric Stéphan	Gaël Le Gourrierec	15 December 2013
21	"Be Happy or Else!" "Le Bonheur à tout Prix"	Hugo Gittard	Cédric Dietsch	15 December 2013
22	"Cosmopig and Astrofly" "Cosmocochon et Astromouche"	Cédric Stéphan	Céline Gobinet	22 December 2013
23	"The Black Fly of the Family" "La Rebelle de la Famille"	Cédric Stéphan	Andrès Fernandez	22 December 2013
24	"Treasure Hunt" "Chasse au Trésor"	Sabine Cipolla; Nicolas Chretien	Andrès Fernandez; Fred Mintoff	22 December 2013
25	"You Drive Me Mad!" "Conduite (mal) accompagnée"	Philippe Clerc	Céline Gobinet	29 December 2013
26	"Pedal for Your Life" "Beau Comme un Vélo"	Hugo Gittard	Cédric Dietsch	29 December 2013
27	"Hide & Seek Guitar" "Cache Cache Guitare"	Philippe Clerc	Gaël Le Gourrierec	29 December 2013
28	"Betcha Can't Do It!" "Pas Cap"	Hugo Gittard	Céline Gobinet	5 January 2014
29	"Play Ball!" "Jour de Match"	Jean-Marc Lenglen	Andrès Fernandez; Fred Mintoff	5 January 2014
30	"Misfortune Teller" "Voyante Extra (pas) Lucide"	Sabine Cipolla; Nicolas Chretien	Andrès Fernandez; Gaël Le Gourrierec	5 January 2014
31	"There's a Fly in My Soup!" "Une Mouche dans le Potage"	Cédric Stéphan	Cédric Dietsch	12 January 2014
32	"Surprise Surprise!" "Surprise !"	Jean-Marc Lenglen	Céline Gobinet	12 January 2014
33	"Me, Myself and I" "Un Ascenseur très particulier"	Hugo Gittard	Andrès Fernandez and Céline Gobinet	12 January 2014
34	"No Pain, No Gain" "100% muscle"	Sabine Cipolla; Nicolas Chretien	Fred Mintoff	19 January 2014
35	"Saving Private Takako" "Il Faut sauver le Soldat Takako"	Louis Albert; Guillaume Cochard	Cédric Dietsch	19 January 2014
36	"Fresh Water Pig" "Cochon d'eau Douce"	Louis Albert; Guillaume Cochard	Andrès Fernandez; Céline Gobinet	19 January 2014
37	"Back to the Wild" "Retour à la Nature"	Philippe Clerc	Cédric Dietsch	26 January 2014
38	"The Haunted Portrait" "Le Tableau Hanté"	Sabine Cipolla; Nicolas Chretien	Andrès Fernandez; Gaël Le Gourrierec	26 January 2014
39	"Cheesy Girlfriend" "Jennifromage"	Sabine Cipolla; Nicolas Chretien	Andrès Fernandez; Gaël Le Gourrierec	26 January 2014
40	"Cat from Outer Space" "Le Chaton venu d'Ailleurs"	Philippe Clerc	Cédric Dietsch	2 February 2014
41	"Gaga Ball" "Complètement Gaga"	Jean-Marc Lenglen	Andrès Fernandez; Céline Gobinet	2 February 2014
42	"What a Nose" "Gros Nez"	Hugo Gittard	Andrès Fernandez; Ronan Lebrun	2 February 2014
43	"Pig Collector" "Cochon de Collection"	Didier Le Jeune	Andrès Fernandez; Alexandre Viano	9 February 2014
44	"Try a Bit Harder!" "Peut mieux Faire"	Hugo Gittard	Cédric Dietsch	9 February 2014
45	"The Not-So Congenial Genie" "Trait de génie"	Louis Albert; Guillaume Cochard	Andrès Fernandez; Ronan Lebrun	16 February 2014
46	"Rock n' Roll Granny" "Mamie pas Gâteau"	Philippe Clerc	Cédric Dietsch	16 February 2014
Hubert rescues a granny who was exposed to loud music, but it turns out she is part of a ferocious metal band.
47	"Pirates in the House" "Les Pirates du Gazon"	Philippe Clerc	Adrian Maganza	16 February 2014
Hubert and Takako's house is taken over by a pirate, and they must fight the pirate to save Jennifer and regain control.
48	"5th Floor Breakdown (Part 1)" "Naufragés du 5ème étage (partie 1)"	Cédric Stéphan	Cédric Dietsch	6 February 2014
Hubert and Takako pay a visit to Hubert's aunt's house. They decide to take the elevator, but it stops working midway-through, leaving them horrified.
49	"Stormy Weather" "Temps de Cochon"	Jean-Marc Lenglen	Ronan Lebrun	23 February 2014
50	"Pig Tales" "Écriture de cochon et pattes de mouche"	Cédric Stéphan	Alexandre Viano	23 February 2014
51	"The Legend of King Hubert" "La Légende du Roi Hubert"	Hugo Gittard	Cédric Dietsch	23 February 2014
52	"Voodoo on You" "Le Vaudou, c'est pas Chou"	Louis Albert; Guillaume Cochard	Ronan Lebrun	2 March 2014
53	"Psycho Tango" "Psychotango"	Philippe Clerc	Cédric Dietsch	2 March 2014
54	"Acrylic" "Acrylique"	Jean-Marc Lenglen	Andrès Fernandez	2 March 2014
55	"It's No Piece of Cake" "C'est pas du Gâteau"	Philippe Clerc	Cédric Dietsch	1 June 2014
56	"Hell's Pig" "Tatouages et pétarades"	Jean-Marc Lenglen	Cédric Dietsch	1 June 2014
57	"No Fraidy-Pig" "Même pas Peur !"	Philippe Clerc	Andrès Fernandez	1 June 2014
58	"The Story of My Life" "Mouche est célèbre"	Jean-Marc Lenglen	Andrès Fernandez; Benjamin Marsaud	15 June 2014
Takako is approached by a reporter to write an article about her, but watches as the spotlight shifts from her to Hubert.
59	"Raffle Trouble" "La tombola"	Jean-Marc Lenglen Based on an Idea by: Sabine Cipolla; Nicolas Chrétien	Cédric Dietsech	8 June 2014
Hubert and Takako fight it out for a raffle prize, as the winner will get private gardening classes with either Jennifer or Euros.
60–61	"Gentlepig Farmer" "Gala d'Olga"	Jean-Marc Lenglen	Jean Cayrol	15 June 2014
Takako brings home a cow. Jennifer visits their estate, where they agree upon farming and selling the products for profit. As the neighbors complain about the stinking smell from the farm, the cow is requested to be sent back. Hubert and his friends drop off the cow back to the countryside.
62	"Is There a Doctor in the House?" "Allo Docteur?"	Louis Albert; Guillaume Cochard	Andrès Fernandez; Benjamin Marsaud	6 July 2014
Dr. Reach Forest comes in to treat Takako. But the world needs to be saved from doomsday. Will Hubert's negative energy destroy Super Reach?
63	"Reach for the Moon" "Décrocher la Lune"	Louis Albert; Guillaume Cochard	Cédric Dietsch	8 June 2014
Hubert learns from Jennifer that she wishes her love must be able to "get her the moon". He takes it too literally and creates a make-believe moon for her.
64	"Box Trick" "Mise en Boîte"	Jean-Marc Lenglen	Jean Cayrol	8 June 2014
65	"Darting to Win!" "Que le Meilleur Gagne!"	Jean-Marc Lenglen	Andrès Fernandez; Benjamin Marsaud	20 July 2014
66	"Pop Takako" "Takako Pop"	Jean-Marc Lenglen	Andrès Fernandez; Benjamin Marsaud	20 July 2014
67	"Beware of the Guardian Angel!" "Gare à l'ange Gardien"	Jean-Marc Lenglen	Cédric Dietsch	20 July 2014
68	"Double Trouble" "Double Cochon"	Jean-Marc Lenglen	Andrès Fernandez	6 July 2014
69	"The Disappearing Eraser" "T'as pas vu ma Gomme ?"	Jean-Marc Lenglen	Oliver Pouchelon	27 July 2014
70	"5th Floor Breakdown: The Revenge (Part 2)" "Naufragés du 5ème étage (partie 2)"	Cédric Dietsch; Andrès Fernandez	Cédric Dietsch	17 August 2014
After their first 5th-floor elevator disaster while visiting Hubert's old aunt, our friends are not going to get stuck in the elevator again. No way José, this time they're talking the stairs! But little do they know what lurks in the staircase!
71	"Parental Disagreement" "Désaccord Parental"	Jean-Marc Lenglen	Andrès Fernandez	27 July 2014
Takako's father comes down to bunk with her after a feud with his wife. Can she handle him?
72	"Blinded by the Dark" "À l'aveuglette"	Jean-Marc Lenglen	Alexandre Viano	27 July 2014
Hubert and Takako have a large uninvited intruder in their house.
73	"A New Lease on Life" "La Dernière Fois"	Jean-Marc Lenglen	Alexandre Viano	27 July 2014
Hubert is given a chance to go to another country, but Takako doesn't want him to leave and does everything possible to trick him into staying.
74	"Serious Series" "Fans de série"	Cédric Stéphan	Cédric Dietsch	13 July 2014
When Hubert introduces Takako to a new TV series, "Bermuda 51", she gets hooked, staying glued to the television and ignoring Hubert completely.
75	"Robot Love" "Un Amour de Robot"	Cédric Stéphan	Alexandre Viano	3 August 2014
Hubert creates a machine for his robot to fall in love with. When Hubert damages the machine, Takako uses a video game to fix it up and save Hubert from the robot's wrath.
76	"Clowning Around" "Fais-moi rire"	Jean Cayrol; Oliver Pouchelon	Cédric Dietsch	17 August 2014
77	"Hubert Jr." "Petit Hubert"	Cédric Stéphan	Oliver Pouchelon	10 August 2014
78	"Return to the Hubert" "Retour vers le Hubert"	Jean-Marc Lenglen Based on a Story by: Louis Albert; Guillaume Cochard	Cédric Dietsch	18 January 2015

== Production ==
It was announced in 2011, alongside Rolling with the Ronks!. The series' overseas animation was provided by Malaysian animation studio Inspidea, with additional animation from Caribara Animation's Montreal divisions and Toutenkartoon Canada. Xilam licensed the series out to MTV Oy and MTV Juniori in Finland, VRT and Ketnet in Belgium, Disney Channel in Japan, Disney XD in Latin America, Australia, New Zealand and Brazil, Nickelodeon, Nickelodeon Sonic and Amazon Prime Video in India, Kanal 2 in Estonia, K2 and Frisbee in Italy, PLUSPLUS in Ukraine, EBC Yoyo in Taiwan and Biggs in Portugal.

Two English dubs for the show were produced, one by ID Audio in London with the voices of Wayne Forester and Harriet Carmichael, and another by SDI Media in Los Angeles with the voices of Joe Ochman and Marieve Herington. The ID Audio dub currently only has one episode ("Pig Tears") available online, while the SDI Media dub can be watched partially on several Xilam-branded YouTube channels and fully on Kidoodle.TV (with "Psycho Tango" and "Hell's Pig" skipped) until its removal in late 2025.

== In other media ==
=== Video games ===
A mobile game featuring Hubert and Takako entitled "Hubert perd les pédales" has been released.
