= Love at Second Sight (2019 film) =

2019 film directed by Hugo Gélin

- Film poster
- French: Mon Inconnue
- Directed by: Hugo Gélin
- Written by: Hugo Gélin; Igor Gotesman; Benjamin Parent
- Starring: François Civil; Joséphine Japy; Benjamin Lavernhe
- Production companies: Zazi Films; Mars Films; Chapka Films; Belga Productions; France 3 Cinéma; C8 Films
- Distributed by: Mars Films (France); Belga Films SA (Belgium)
- Release dates: 18 January 2019 (L'Alpe d'Huez Film Festival); 3 April 2019 (France)
- Running time: 118 minutes
- Countries: France; Belgium
- Languages: French; English
- Box office: $6 million

Love at Second Sight (French: Mon Inconnue, lit. 'My Stranger') is a 2019 French-Belgian romantic comedy film directed by Hugo Gélin, starring François Civil, Joséphine Japy and Benjamin Lavernhe. The film made its world premiere at the L'Alpe d'Huez Film Festival on 18 January 2019, where Civil received the Best Actor award. It was released theatrically in France by Mars Films on 3 April 2019. It won the Swann d'Or for Best Film at the 2019 Cabourg Film Festival. Benjamin Lavernhe was nominated for the César Award for Best Supporting Actor for his performance in the film.

== Plot ==
Raphaël is a student who writes a science fiction novel during his school lessons, but doesn't dare showing it to anyone. One day he falls in love with Olivia, another student, who is a promising pianist. Raphaël rewrites his novel, incorporating a new character based on Olivia. With Olivia's help, Raphaël becomes a famous sci-fi writer. The two marry, but soon Raphaël gradually distances himself from Olivia, who abandons her career path and becomes a school music teacher.

One evening, Raphaël, finalising his sequel novel, decides to kill off the female character he based on Olivia, and on the same night, he has a huge argument with her. After a snowstorm, the next morning, Raphaël finds himself in a parallel world in which Olivia has never met him and doesn't even know who he is. In this world, she is now a successful and famous pianist while he is a literature teacher who has never completed his novel.

Having realised what has happened, Raphaël attempts to return to his former world. With the help of his best friend Félix, he learns more about his life in this world and manages to talk to Olivia. However, he discovers she is now in a relationship with her manager, Marc. Under the false pretext of writing her biography, Raphaël spends more time with Olivia and makes her fall for him again. Still, Olivia accepts Marc's proposal when he asks her to marry him, and tells Raphaël she wishes she met him years ago.

In a last attempt to get his life back, Raphaël rewrites his sequel novel with a different end, and guesses that Olivia reading it may be the key to reverse the reality. He then gives it to Olivia and asks her to read it as a last favour. When she starts reading the novel, it begins to snow like the night they had the argument. As a result, Raphaël understands his theory is working. But, as he is reminiscing his whole love story with Olivia, he realises she is maybe better off without him. While Olivia is performing on stage, he takes back the novel before she can finish it, and chooses to stay in this world where Olivia appears happier. At the end, Olivia decides to leave Marc, and joins Raphaël to kiss him in a final scene.

== Cast ==
- François Civil as Raphaël
- Joséphine Japy as Olivia
- Benjamin Lavernhe as Félix, Raphaël's best friend
- Camille Lellouche as Mélanie, Raphaël's one night stand
- Édith Scob as Gabrielle, Olivia's grandmother
- Amaury de Crayencour as Marc, Olivia's possible future husband
- Juliette Dol as Morgane, Félix's partner
- Samir Boitard as literature teacher
- Christian Benedetti as Étienne Robert, editor
- Laurent Delahousse as himself
- Franck Provost as himself

== Filming ==
Filming took place in Paris between 16 January 2018 and 18 March 2018.

== Reception ==
AlloCiné, a French cinema website, gave the film an average rating of 3.9/5, based on a survey of 25 French reviews.

50% of the eight reviews compiled by Rotten Tomatoes are positive, with an average rating of 4.7/10.

== Box office ==
The film debuted at number 5 at the French box office, with 209,564 admissions. It sold a total of 559,126 tickets after 13 weeks in cinemas in France and grossed $5.9 million worldwide.

Love at Second Sight was the first French film to be released in China since the COVID-19 pandemic. It was the second most successful French film at the international box office (behind The Wolf and the Lion) in April 2022. It garnered 261,000 admissions and €1.17 million at the Chinese box office until December 2022.

== Awards and nominations ==
| Year | Award / Festival | Category | Nominee | Result | Ref. |
|---|---|---|---|---|---|
| 2019 | L'Alpe d'Huez Film Festival | Best Actor | François Civil | Won | |
| 2019 | Cabourg Film Festival | Swann d'Or for Best Film | Hugo Gélin | Won | |
| 2020 | César Awards | Best Supporting Actor | Benjamin Lavernhe | Nominated | |
