= Just Like Brothers =

- Theatrical release poster
- Directed by: Hugo Gélin
- Written by: Hugo Gélin; Romain Protat; Hervé Mimran
- Produced by: Laetitia Galitzine; Hugo Gélin; Pierre-Ange Le Pogam
- Starring: François-Xavier Demaison; Nicolas Duvauchelle; Pierre Niney; Mélanie Thierry
- Cinematography: Nicolas Massart
- Edited by: Grégoire Sivan
- Music by: Revolver
- Production companies: Zazi Films; Stone Angels; Direct Cinéma
- Distributed by: Stone Angels
- Release dates: 26 August 2012 (Angoulême); 21 November 2012
- Running time: 104 minutes
- Country: France
- Language: French
- Budget: $3.9 million
- Box office: $2.5 million

Just Like Brothers (original title: Comme des frères) is a 2012 French comedy film written, directed and produced by Hugo Gélin.

== Plot ==
Since Charlie (Melanie Thierry) died, Boris (François-Xavier Demaison), a businessman, Elie (Nicolas Duvauchelle), a renowned scriptwriter, and Maxime (Pierre Niney), a naive 20-year-old boy, lost the woman of their lives. These characters with opposite personalities find themselves involved in a 900-km long journey to the cherished Corsica house of their sister, their friend, their love.

== Cast ==
- François-Xavier Demaison as Boris
- Nicolas Duvauchelle as Élie
- Pierre Niney as Maxime
- Mélanie Thierry as Charlie
- Lannick Gautry as Vassily
- Philippe Laudenbach as Grandfather
- Florence Thomassin as Line

== Production ==
At the end of the 2000s, Hugo Gelin planned to make a film but shortly before the shooting started, a distributor withdrew from the project. He then created a production company named Zazi films and started to prepare three movies, including Comme des frères. The story is partly inspired by the friendship between the 30-year-old film director and two of his friends, who are 20 and 40 years old. According to Hugo Gelin, this kind of "unusual friendship" is rarely adapted to the screen.

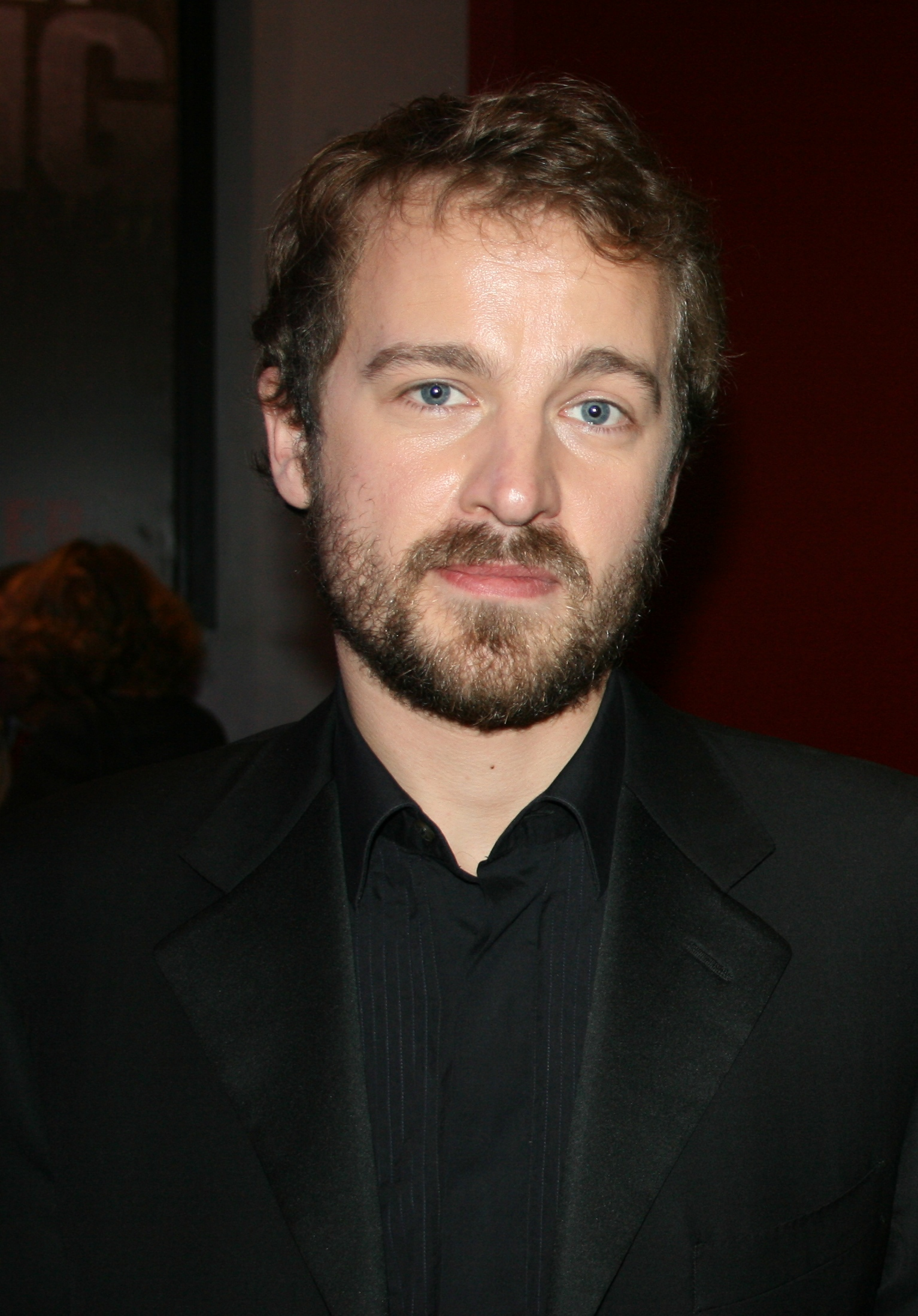
Jocelyn Quivrin, who inspired Gelin for the scenario

Comme des frères is dedicated to Jocelyn Quivrin, one of Hugo Gelin's best friends, who died while the film was being written. After this event, Hugo Gelin decided to make this film a comedy.

The amusement park scene was shot in September 2011 in Nigloland in the French departement of Aube. The park is renamed "Fifouland" in the film. Amongst others, scenes were shot in Corsica, in Aix-en-Provence, in Paris or even in Germany.

== Music ==
The original soundtrack of the film is almost exclusively composed of songs from the band Revolver, written or re-recorded for the film. Three of the twenty-four tracks don't belong to the French band: Shame Shame Shame by The Khaliq Group, The Days We Won’t Spend by Thomas Darmon and Nothing From Nothing by Billy Preston. The album was released in November 2012, 12th led by the single Parallel Lives.

== Release ==
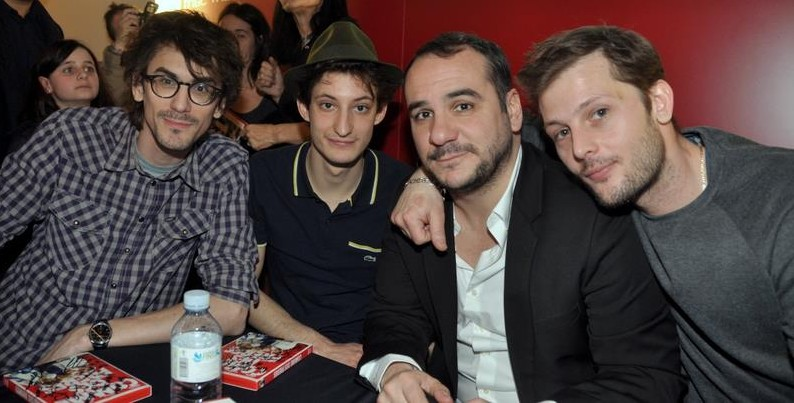
From left to right: Hugo Gélin, Pierre Niney, François-Xavier Demaison and Nicolas Duvauchelle

Before Comme des frères was released, the film's team promoted it between August and November 2012 in many festivals such as Lama (Corsica), Angoulême, Paris (Telerama Festival), Colmar, Montpellier, Reunion, Sarlat, and also premieres with Hugo Gelin and the three main characters as special guests occurred throughout France.

== Critical response ==
The film received positive reviews from the written press. For Jean-Pierre Lacomme from Le Journal du Dimanche, this is a "beautiful road-movie". According to Paris Match, "the juvenile energy and the sincerity [of the movie] should involve even the more sceptical viewer". In Elle, Khadija Moussou talks about the "cinematographic surprise of the season."

The press particularly praised the actors. According to Jean-Pierre Lacomme, the "three comedians work well together". Paris Match talks about a "quartet of four comedians in a dainty harmony". For Khadija Moussou, "thanks to the clever and successful dialogues, these three are doing brilliantly". For Vincent Julé from the Parisien, "the alchemy between the three comedians is undeniable". He grants a special mention for Nicolas Duvauchelle, "incredibly natural". Others proved to be more touched by the "tormented Melanie Thierry", "radiant" in the eye of Jean-Philippe Guerand from Nouvel Obs. For him, François Xavier Demaison has hardly ever been "so sober and touching". For Guillemette Odicio from Télérama, the actor is "still as effective". Most of the critics pay tribute to Pierre Niney's performance, even amounting to talk about a "real discovery" or a "revelation".

== Accolades ==
Award / Film Festival	Category	Recipients and nominees	Result
César Awards	Most Promising Actor	Pierre Niney	Nominated
César Awards	Best First Feature Film		Nominated
Lumière Awards	Most Promising Actor	Pierre Niney	Nominated
