= The Dream Kids =

- Film poster
- French: Les petits princes
- Directed by: Vianney Lebasque
- Written by: Vianney Lebasque; Matthieu Gompel
- Produced by: Marc-Etienne Schwartz; Philippe Schwartz; Maya Hariri; Joffrey Hutin; Virginie Silla; Eric Abidal; David Venditelli
- Starring: Paul Bartel; Reda Kateb; Eddy Mitchell
- Cinematography: Manuel Teran
- Edited by: Claire Fieschi
- Music by: Christophe Menassier
- Distributed by: EuropaCorp
- Release date: 26 June 2013
- Running time: 86 minutes
- Country: France
- Language: French
- Budget: $3,4 million
- Box office: $546,375

The Dream Kids (French: Les petits princes) is a 2013 French comedy-drama film directed by Vianney Lebasque.

== Plot ==
JB, 16 years old prodigy, is the latest to join the training center where evolve the greatest hopes of football. Between friendship, competition, rivalry and his attraction to Lila, a young girl passionate by the street art, JB will have to fight despite the dark secret that could prevent him from achieving his dream.

== Cast ==
- Paul Bartel as JB
- Margot Bancilhon as Lila
- Reda Kateb as Reza
- Eddy Mitchell as Coach
- Samy Seghir as Selim
- Olivier Rabourdin as Christian
- Adel Bencherif as Sofiane
- Ralph Amoussou as El Malah
- Ahmed Dramé as Nimo
- Mathias Mlekuz as Guy
- Clément Solignac as Steve
- Antoine Bujoli as Wu
- Robert Abogo as Roger
- François Deblock as Piwi
- Amélie Chavaudra as Anais
- Sidwell Weber as Juliette
- Cédric Ben Abdallah as Mickael
- Paola Guidicelli as Constance

== Awards and nominations ==
- Paul Bartel is Nominated to the César Award for Most Promising Actor
