= Julien Courbey =

French actor

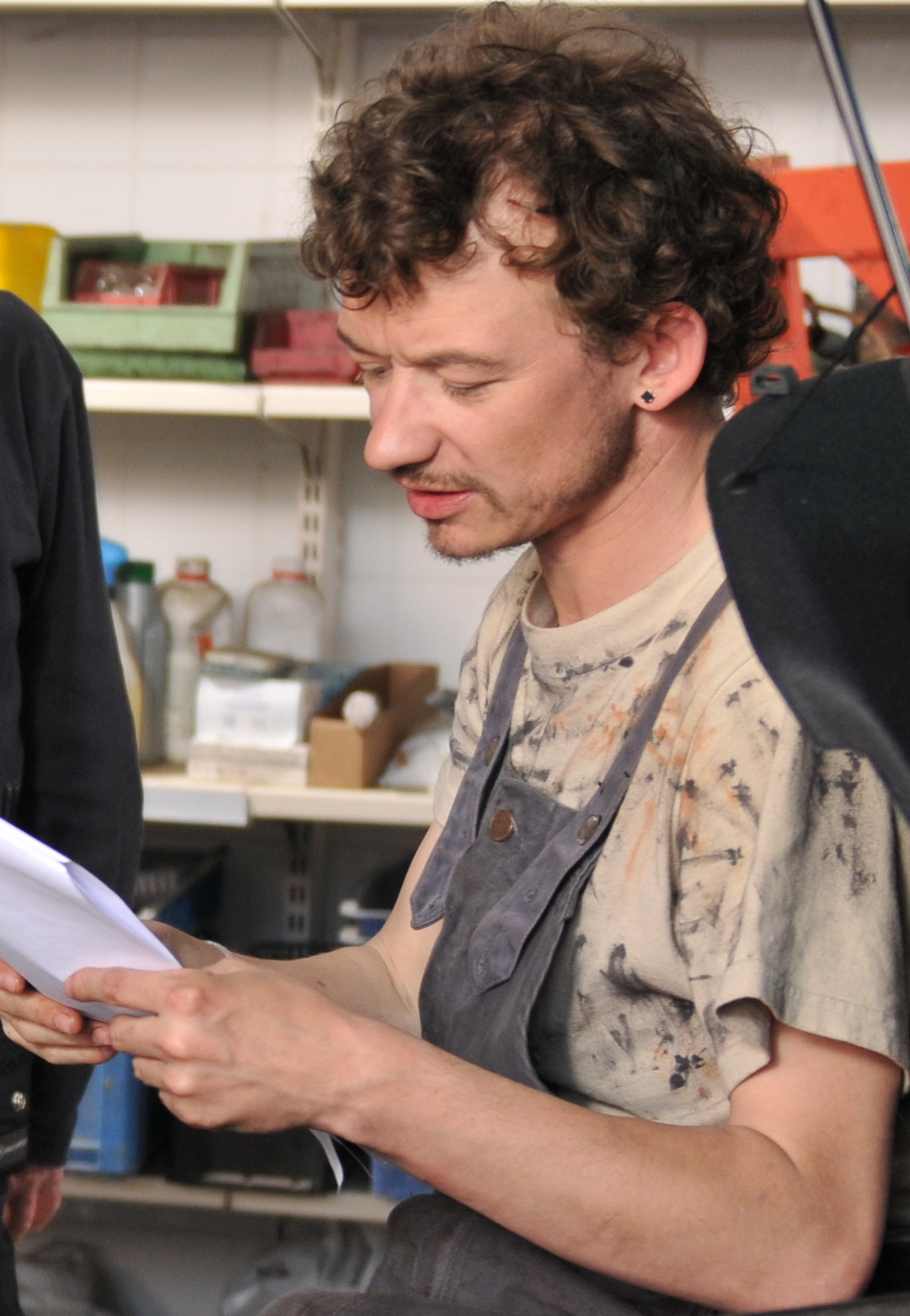
- Born: 12 March 1976 (age 50); Toulouse, France
- Occupation: Actor
- Years active: 1990–present

Julien Courbey (born 12 March 1976) is a French actor.

== Theater ==
Year	Title	Author	Director
1990	Zone libre	Jean-Claude Grumberg	Maurice Bénichou
1993	La Fortune du pot	Jean-François Josselin	Étienne Bierry

== Filmography ==
Year	Title	Role	Director	Notes
1991	Triplex		Georges Lautner	
1993	À cause d'elle	The hospitalized boy	Jean-Loup Hubert	
1993	La fortune de Gaspard	André	Gérard Blain	TV movie
1993	The Intrepids		Alexandre Magnus	TV series (1 episode)
1993-1995	Seconde B	Henri Séguri	Christophe Gregeois, Frédéric Demont, ...	TV series (76 episodes)
1994	Priez pour nous	The friend	Jean-Pierre Vergne	
1994	Le clandestin	Maxime	Jean-Louis Bertucelli	TV movie
1994	Navarro	Christophe Combert	Patrick Jamain	TV series (1 episode)
1995	Les Anges gardiens	Jérôme	Jean-Marie Poiré	
1995	Adultery: A User's Guide	The young commuter	Christine Pascal	
1995	Julie Lescaut	Phipou	Élisabeth Rappeneau	TV series (1 episode)
1995	L'histoire du samedi	Viala	Luc Béraud	TV series (1 episode)
1996	Men, Women: A User's Manual		Claude Lelouch	
1996	Y a du foutage de gueule dans l'air		Djamel Bensalah	Short
1996	Une fille à papas	Jean-Bat	Pierre Joassin	TV movie
1997	K	Stein Family	Alexandre Arcady	
1997	Josephine, Guardian Angel	The boy	Dominique Baron	TV series (1 episode)
1999	Le ciel, les oiseaux,... et ta mère !	Mike	Djamel Bensalah	
1999	Une dette mortelle	Michel Fernandez	Alain Tasma	TV movie
2000	Old School	Nico Pasquali	Kader Ayd	
2001	Beautiful Memories	Stéphane	Zabou Breitman	
2001	Gamer	Momo	Zak Fishman	
2001	Jeunes proies	Michel Fernandez	Marc Angelo	TV movie
2002	The Race	Kader	Djamel Bensalah	
2003	Chouchou	Yekea	Merzak Allouache	
2004	Alive	Steve	Frédéric Berthe	
2005	Il était une fois dans l'oued	Johnny Leclerc / Abdel Bachir	Djamel Bensalah	
2006	Beur blanc rouge	Gaby	Mahmoud Zemmouri	
2006-2007	Section de recherches	Léon	Gérard Marx, Vincenzo Marano, ...	TV series (12 episodes)
2007	Jean de La Fontaine - Le défi	Molière	Daniel Vigne	
2007	Big City	Attacked Man	Djamel Bensalah	
2008	Paris 36	Mondain	Christophe Barratier	
2008	Affaire de famille	Samy	Claus Drexel	
2008	Asylum	Jack	Olivier Chateau	
2008	Marié(s) ou presque	Coustaud	Franck Llopis	
2009	The Barons	Franck Tabla	Nabil Ben Yadir	
2009	Neuilly Yo Mama!	The sport teacher	Gabriel Julien-Laferrière	
2009	Orpailleur	Gonz	Marc Barrat	
2009	Les suspects	Arto	Sébastien Onomo	Short
2009	Big H Story	Big H	Sebastien Rossi	Short
2009	Tuer encore ? Jamais plus !	Alan	Moreno Boriani & Frederic Moreau De Bellaing	Short
2010	Chronique de l'Afrique sauvage	Philippe	Issam Mathlouti	Short
2010	En chantier, monsieur Tanner !	Pedro Kantor	Stefan Liberski	TV movie
2010	Coursier de merde	Gaetan Foirest	Alexandre Lemoine	TV series (1 episode)
2011	Beur sur la ville	Lieutenant Juju	Djamel Bensalah	
2012	Etat sauvage	Steve	Saïko Thlang	
2012	Road Nine	Simon	Sebastien Rossi	
2012	Voyage sans retour	Karim	François Gérard	
2012	Au paradis des hommes	Clément	Cédric Malzieu	
2012	Un flic	The homeless	Patrick Dewolf	TV series (1 episode)
2013	La voix de l'ange	Father	Olivier Tangkun	Short
2013	Hors-Sujet !	Bruce	Semy Chébinou	TV movie
2014	Promotion canapé		Adrien François	Short
2014	La crèche des hommes	Paulo	Hervé Brami	TV movie
2015	L'homme de l'île Sandwich	Man from the Sandwich Island	Levon Minasian	Short
2016	A State of Emergency	The homeless	Tarek Roehlinger	Short
2017	Sang Froid	The mover	Marius Larrive	Short
2018	Neuilly sa mère, sa mère!	Jérôme	Gabriel Julien-Laferrière	
2018	On the Other Side	Eugène	Zulma Rouge	Short
2019	La route du sel		Matthieu Vigneau	Short
2019	Super Z	Stephana	Julien de Volte & Arnaud Tabarly	Post-Production
2019	419	Da Silva	Eric Bartonio	Post-Production
