= Chloé Coulloud =

French actress

- Born: 2 october 1987 (37 years); Torcy
- Occupation: Actress 🇫🇷🇵🇹

Chloé Coulloud is a French actress, known for her role in the 2011 French horror movie Livide.

== Filmography ==
Film and Television
Year	Title	Role	Notes
2006	L'École pour tous	Cindy	
2007	La Tête de maman	Lucille 'Lulu' Gotchac	
2007	La Surprise	Justine	TV movie
2009	Neuilly sa mère !	Caroline	
2009	Verso	Lou Decker	
2010	Serge Gainsbourg : vie héroïque	Marilou	
2010	L'Autre Dumas	Sophie	
2010	Eva	Eva	Short
2011	Beur sur la ville	Priscilla	
2011	Livide	Lucie	
2016	Amis publics	Ana	
2018	Neuilly sa mère, sa mère !	Caroline	
