= La Place royale =

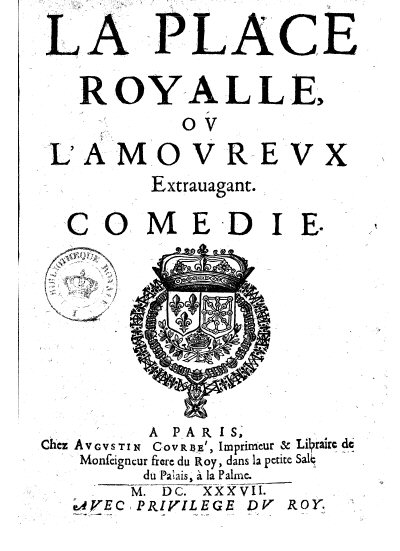
- title page from the 1637 edition
- Written by: Pierre Corneille
- Characters: Alidor; Angélique; Cléandre; Doraste; Phylis; Lysis; Polymas; Lycante
- Original language: French
- Genre: comedy
- Setting: La Place royale, Paris

Premiere
- Date premiered: 1634
- Place premiered: France

La Place Royale, ou l'amoureux extravagant (English: La Place royale or the extravagant lover) is a five-act comedy written by Pierre Corneille in 1634. It tells the story of Alidor who wants to break off his engagement with Angélique by giving her over to his best friend Cléandre. In this play, Corneille addresses questions of love and liberty.

== Plot summary ==
Angélique is in love with Alidor, but Alidor is afraid of being trapped into marriage. He schemes with his friend Cléandre (who is also in love with Angélique) to end the relationship. They plant a fake love letter to a certain Clarine where Angélique can find it. Thinking that Alidor is in love with Clarine, Angélique ends the relationship. Seeing an opportunity, Angélique's friend Phylis sends her brother Doraste to Angélique. Doraste is also in love with Angélique. In her despair over Alidor's seeming betrayal, she agrees to marry Doraste that evening.

This is not what Alidor and Cléandre had hoped for, as Alidor was planning on Angélique turning to Cléandre instead. They create a second plot to kidnap Angélique from the garden before the marriage; after having spent the night with Cléandre, she would have no choice but to marry him. Unfortunately, Cléandre and Alidor's helpers mistake Phylis for Angélique in the garden and carry her off instead. Meanwhile, Angélique arrives in the garden and discovers what lengths Alidor has gone to break off the relationship. Elsewhere, Phylis and Cléandre fall in love and plan to marry. Devastated about her being used as a pawn, Angélique decides to enter a convent. Alidor is finally free to live his life without fear of marriage.

== Characters ==
- Alidor, lover of Angélique
- Cléandre, friend of Alidor, in love with Angélique
- Angélique, lover of Alidor and later of Doraste
- Doraste, brother of Phylis, in love with Angélique
- Phylis, sister of Doraste, friend of Angélique
- Lysis, lover of Phylis
- Polymas, servant of Alidor
- Lycante, domestique de Doraste
