= Faultless (film) =

- Theatrical release poster
- French: Irréprochable
- Directed by: Sébastien Marnier
- Written by: Sébastien Marnier
- Produced by: Caroline Bonmarchand
- Starring: Marina Foïs; Jérémie Elkaïm; Joséphine Japy; Benjamin Biolay
- Cinematography: Laurent Brunet
- Edited by: Laurence Bawedin
- Music by: Zombie Zombie
- Production companies: Avenue B Productions; Orange Studio
- Distributed by: Memento Films Distribution
- Release dates: 3 July 2016 (La Rochelle); 6 July 2016 (France)
- Running time: 103 minutes
- Country: France
- Language: French
- Budget: $2.3 million
- Box office: $1.1 million

Faultless (French: Irréprochable) is a 2016 French thriller film written and directed by Sébastien Marnier. The film stars Marina Foïs, Jérémie Elkaïm, Joséphine Japy, and Benjamin Biolay.

== Plot ==
Out of a job for over a year, Constance returns to her hometown when she learns that the real estate agency where she first began her career is hiring again. Her former boss prefers Audrey, a candidate who is much younger than Constance. But Constance will do anything to reclaim the position that she considers to be her own.

== Cast ==
- Marina Foïs as Constance
- Jérémie Elkaïm as Philippe
- Joséphine Japy as Audrey
- Benjamin Biolay as Gilles
- Jean-Luc Vincent as Alain
- Jeanne Rosa as Nathalie
- Véronique Ruggia Saura as Lawyer

== Accolades ==
Award / Film Festival	Category	Recipients and nominees	Result
César Awards	Best Actress	Marina Foïs	Nominated
