= Two Is a Family =

- Theatrical release poster
- Directed by: Hugo Gélin
- Written by: Hugo Gélin; Mathieu Oullion; Jean-André Yerlès
- Based on: Instructions Not Included written by Eugenio Derbez
- Produced by: Philippe Rousselet; Stéphane Célérier
- Starring: Omar Sy
- Cinematography: Guillaume Massart
- Edited by: Grégoire Sivan
- Music by: Rob Simonsen
- Production companies: Vendôme Production; Mars Films
- Distributed by: Mars Films
- Release date: 7 December 2016
- Country: France
- Language: French
- Budget: $17.5 million
- Box office: $32.8 million

Two Is a Family (French: Demain tout commence) is a 2016 French comedy-drama film remake of the Mexican film Instructions Not Included (No se Aceptan Devoluciones), directed by Hugo Gélin and starring Omar Sy.

== Plot ==
Samuel (Omar Sy), runner, party-goer and womanizer, lives by the sea in the south of France. Unattached, his life changes the day when Kristin (Clémence Poésy), a former fling, places his three-month-old daughter Gloria in his arms. Unable to take care of her, he embarks on a trip to London, in order to return Gloria to her mother. He loses track of Kristin, does not have a penny in his pocket and does not speak a word of English. Fortunately, he meets Bernie (Antoine Bertrand), a Frenchman who works in the film industry and offers him a stunt job.

Over the next eight years, Samuel raises Gloria and works as a stuntman, with Gloria often accompanying him as he still cannot speak English. Samuel creates an imaginary secret agent mother for Gloria, who corresponds with her on the Internet. During a visit to the doctor, the audience is led to believe that Samuel has a terminal illness. One day, when Gloria is eight, her real mother shows up from New York with her boyfriend Lowell (Ashley Walters), and a new maternal instinct. Samuel is frustrated with Kristin, who eventually asks to take Gloria back to New York with her. Gloria becomes alienated from her father when she overhears him revealing that he fabricated her mother's backstory.

Kristin eventually requests custody of Gloria, and the case is taken to court. Samuel successfully convinces the judge that he has Gloria's best interests at heart, and is awarded custody. However, Kristin then requests a DNA test, which reveals that Samuel is not Gloria's biological father. While losing custody, Samuel escapes with Gloria to his former job in France. While searching for them, Bernie confronts Kristin and reveals that Gloria, in fact, is terminally ill and could die at any time. Bernie and Kristin eventually find them on the beach, where Kristin drops her custody attempts and all four reunite as a family. The film ends with Samuel sitting alone on the beach, implying that Gloria has passed away.

== Cast ==
- Omar Sy as Samuel
- Gloria Colston as Gloria
- Clémence Poésy as Kristin Stuart
- Antoine Bertrand as Bernie
- Ashley Walters as Lowell
- Clémentine Célarié as Samantha
- Ruben Alves had a minor role.

== Production ==
The film was based on the 2012 Mexico comedy-drama film Instructions Not Included. It began principal photography on 21 September 2015 in Southern France before moving to London. Filming was scheduled to conclude on 10 December 2015.

== Reception ==
On Rotten Tomatoes, the film has an approval rating of 38%.
