= Anne-Sophie Brasme =

French writer (born 1984)

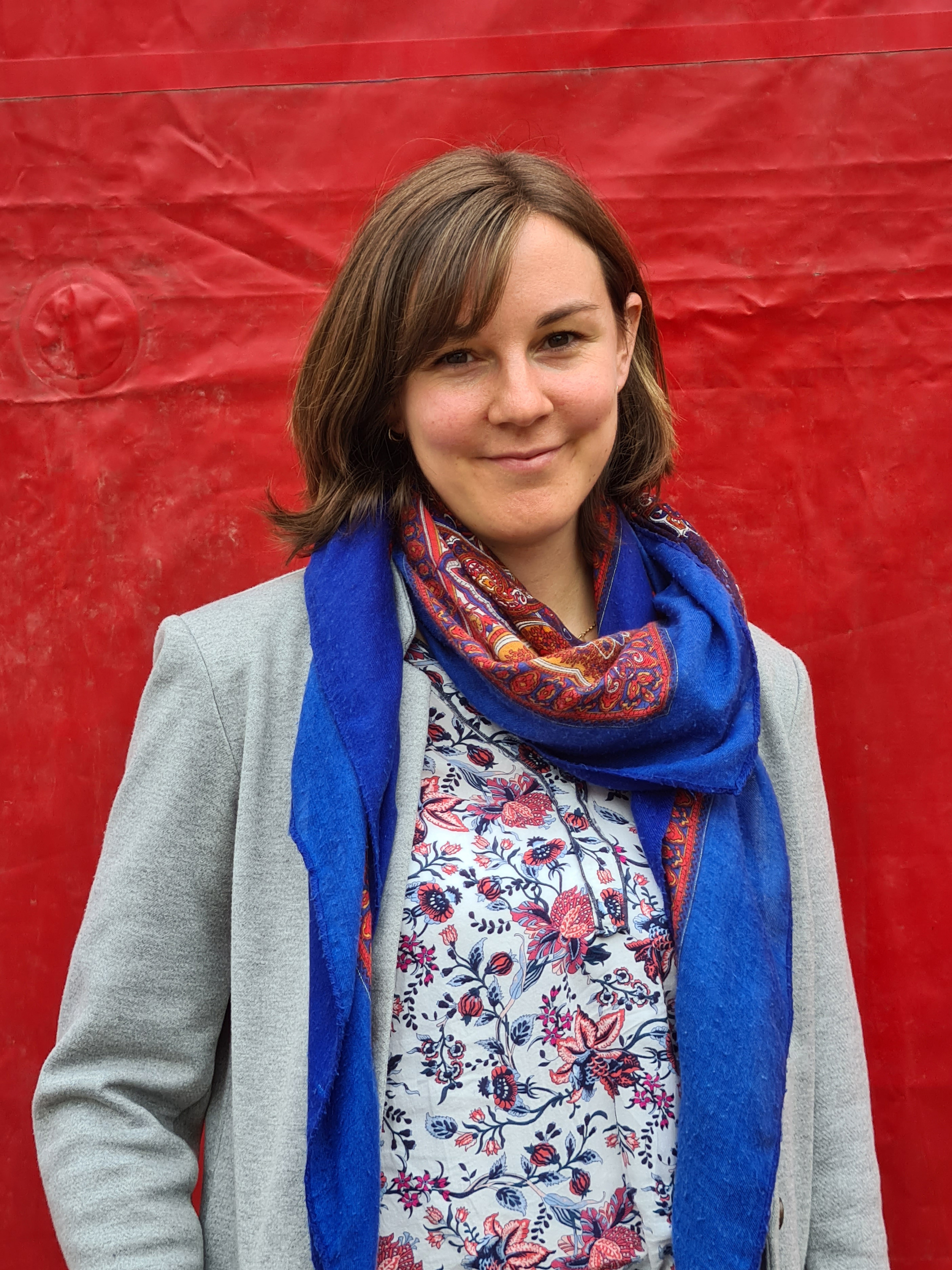
- Born: Metz, France
- Occupation: Writer

Anne-Sophie Brasme (born 1984 in Metz) is a French writer who lives in Metz. She is a qualified teacher of Modern Literature, having studied at the Sorbonne in Paris.

== Novels ==
Brasme wrote her first novel, Breathe (also known as Respire) at the age of 16, when she was still at school. It concerns a friendship that degenerates to the point of obsession. The novel was on the bestseller list of France for several months and has been sold in 17 countries. It was awarded the Prix Contrepoint in 2002. The English translation by Rory Mulholland appeared in 2003.

Brasme's second novel, The First Time I Saw It on a Saturday Afternoon (in the original, Le Carnaval des monstres, 2006), is about the ugliness of two people, who are both destroyed by an incredible passion. Both these novels were received with great enthusiasm in France. Her third published work is Notre Vie antérieure.

Brasme's university thesis was entitled Virginia Woolf et l'impressionisme (2007).
