= Beur sur la ville =

2011 film

- Theatrical release poster
- Directed by: Djamel Bensalah
- Written by: Djamel Bensalah
- Produced by: Djamel Bensalah
- Starring: Booder; Issa Doumbia; Steve Tran; Sandrine Kiberlain; Josiane Balasko; Gérard Jugnot
- Cinematography: Pascal Gennesseaux
- Edited by: Jean-François Elie
- Music by: Rachid Taha
- Production company: Miroir Magique!
- Distributed by: Paramount Pictures
- Release date: 12 October 2011
- Running time: 99 minutes
- Country: France
- Language: French
- Budget: $11.5 million
- Box office: $3.7 million

Beur sur la ville (lit. 'Arab on the city') is a 2011 French comedy directed by Djamel Bensalah.

== Plot ==
Khalid Belkacem is a young Frenchman of Maghrebi origin who has failed all his graduation exams. However, he discovers that he still has one unlikely opportunity left: joining the police force. As a police officer, he teams up with Mamadou, a black man, and Henri, an Asian, and together, they have to take down a serial killer who strikes every Friday in their banlieue.

== Cast ==
- Booder as Khalid Belkacem
- Issa Doumbia as Koulibali
- Steve Tran as Tong
- Sandrine Kiberlain as Diane
- Josiane Balasko as Mamie Nova
- Gérard Jugnot as Gassier
- Éva Darlan as Mme Gassier
- Roland Giraud as Prefect Flaubert
- François-Xavier Demaison as Picolini
- Julie de Bona as Alice Gassier
- Biyouna as Khalid's mother
- Mohamed Benyamna as Khalid's father
- Pierre Ménès as Pierrot
- Khalid Maadour as José Da Silva
- Sacha Bourdo as Trouduk
- Chloé Coulloud as Priscilla
- Yves Rénier as Captain Jancovic
- Paul Belmondo as Lieutenant Liotey
- Julien Courbey as Lieutenant Juju
- David Saracino as Lieutenant Fabiani
- Rodolphe Brazy as Lieutenant Patrick
- Samy Seghir as Police trainee
- Valérie Lemercier as Stadium announcer
- Jean-Claude Van Damme as Colonel
- Jacques Boudet as Minister
- Lionel Abelanski as Forensic doctor
- Marilou Berry as The girl with the broken teeth
- Frédérique Bel as The blond
- Mokobé as The paramedic
- Ramzy Bedia as Paki
- Frédéric Beigbeder as Mercedes 600 driver
- Serra Yılmaz as Nurse
- Pape Diouf as Journalist
