= Neuilly Yo Mama! =

2009 French comedy film

- DVD cover
- French: Neuilly sa mère !
- Directed by: Gabriel Julien-Laferrière
- Screenplay by: Philippe de Chauveron, Marc de Chauveron
- Produced by: Djamel Bensalah; Isaac Sharry
- Starring: Samy Seghir
- Cinematography: Pascal Gennesseaux
- Edited by: Jean-François Elie
- Distributed by: TFM Distribution
- Release date: 12 August 2009 (France)
- Running time: 97 minutes
- Country: France
- Language: French
- Budget: $5.6 million
- Box office: $22.2 million

Neuilly Yo Mama! (French: Neuilly sa mère ! [nøji sa mɛʁ]) is a 2009 French comedy film directed by Gabriel Julien-Laferrière. It stars Samy Seghir as a beur teenager who moves from the housing projects to the upscale neighbourhood of Neuilly-sur-Seine. Because of its use of social inequality as a comedic device, it has been compared to the 1988 French comedy Life Is a Long Quiet River (La vie est un long fleuve tranquille). A sequel, titled Neuilly sa mère, sa mère!, was filmed in 2018.

A word-for-word translation of the film's title is "Neuilly his/her mother!". The title is a play on the vulgar French insult nique ta mère ("screw your mother"), in which Neuilly effectively serves as a euphemism.

== Plot ==
Fourteen-year-old Sami (Samy Seghir) is a beur (a French person of Maghrebi descent) living in Chalon-sur-Saône, a relatively poor city in the Burgundy region. When his widowed mother (Farida Khelfa) takes a job working on a boat, she sends Sami to live with her sister Djamila (Rachida Brakni), who is married to Frenchman Stanislas de Chazelle (Denis Podalydès). They live in the upscale neighborhood of Neuilly-sur-Seine, an affluent suburb of Paris, with Stanislas' two children from his prior marriage: Charles (Jérémy Denisty), who aspires to be a politician someday, and Caroline (Chloé Coulloud). At first Charles resents Sami's presence in his house, but they gradually become friends. Sami enrolls in classes at Saint-Exupéry, a private school there.

Sami is made fun of by many of his classmates at school, particularly Guilain Lambert (Mathieu Spinosi). He impresses the blonde violinist Marie (Joséphine Japy), however, with his tender side: during a music class one of the pieces moves him to tears by making him think of his friends back in Chalon. He and Marie become friends. Guilain, who also has his eye on Marie, gets revenge by tricking Sami into eating pork (which Sami cannot eat, as it is haraam), and Sami retaliates by beating up Guilain. Marie chides Sami, saying she will not tolerate violent boys, but they soon make up. Later, though, when Guilain and Charles end up running against one another in the class elections, Guilain hires a local thug Malik (Booder) to mug Sami and Charles. They manage to escape from Malik and his thugs, but Malik gives Sami a black eye in the process; when Marie sees the black eye, she becomes angry with Sami, thinking he got in a fight again.

Sami and Charles decide to throw a party in their house, to try to win votes for Charles for the class delegate election. Marie comes to the party and has forgiven Sami, but before they can talk Malik and his friends show up to trash the house. Some friends Sami invited from Chalon (Shaiko Dieng and Pierre Louis Bellet), however, soon arrive, and with their help the partygoers give Malik a beating and chase him and his thugs away. Malik finds Guilain and, thinking Guilain set him up, gives him a beating that sends him to the emergency room. Guilain and his mother encounter Sami's aunt Djamila and uncle Stanislas at the hospital, and tell them that the beating was Sami's fault. Djamila, enraged, returns home and tells Sami she is sending him back to his mother.

Marie finds Malik and pays him to tell the school headmistress (Josiane Balasko) that he is responsible for Guilain's beating, however he refuses the cash and told her that he had already told the story to the headmistress. The Headmistress informs Djamila, and she forgives Sami. Charles wins the election with the help of a well-written letter to the class, and goes on to meet all of Sami's friends back in Chalon, urging them to remember his name and vote for him in the future. Sami stays in Neuilly-sur-Seine, and begins a romantic relationship with Marie.

== Cast ==
- Samy Seghir: Sami Benboudaoud
- Rachida Brakni: Djamila
- Denis Podalydès: Stanislas de Chazelle
- Jérémy Denisty: Charles de Chazelle
- Chloé Coulloud: Caroline
- Joséphine Japy: Marie
- Mathieu Spinosi: Guilain Lambert
- Valérie Lemercier : Brigitte
- Marie-Christine Adam: Guilain's mother
- Farida Khelfa: Nadia
- Ramzy Bedia: Aziz
- Shaiko Dieng: Mam
- Pierre Louis Bellet: Jason
- Anne Duverneuil: Sophie Bourgeois
- Josiane Balasko: The director of Saint-Exupéry
- François-Xavier Demaison: Father Dinaro
- Armelle: Madame Blanchet
- Olivier Baroux: Monsieur Boulegue
- Booder: Abdelmalik ("Malik")
- Reem Kherici: Rislem
- Frédéric Chau - Chow-Yung-Fi
- Éric Judor: Table tennis player
- Julien Courbey: The sport teacher

== Soundtrack ==
The film's title track was recorded by Faf Larage and Magic System.

== Reception ==
Cyril Perraudat, reviewing for cinema-france.com, gives the film a score of 5 out of 10, calling it "a pile of clichés" ("un tas de clichés") and saying it will not be remembered ("ne restera pas dans les mémoires"), although he praises Seghir's acting in the role of Sami. Cine'Magic, in that blog's review, states that the film is boring and too "déjà-vu". Marwan Chahine of Libération magazine, on the other hand, praised the film's political jokes and allusions to political personalities.
