= Sébastien Marnier =

French film director (born 1977)

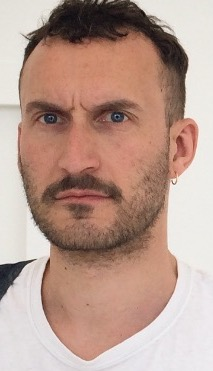
- Born: 22 September 1977 (age 48); Les Lilas, Île-de-France, France
- Occupations: film director, screenwriter
- Years active: 2000s-present
- Notable work: The Origin of Evil

Sébastien Marnier (born September 22, 1977) is a French film director and screenwriter, best known for his 2022 film The Origin of Evil (L'Origine du mal).

== Background ==
A graduate of Paris 8 University Vincennes-Saint-Denis, he was a contributor to Michel Reilhac's 2002 film The Good Old Naughty Days (Polissons et Galipettes), and co-directed two short films, The Main Game (Le Grand Avoir) and Handsome Jack (Le Beau Jacques), with Élise Griffon. As a novice emerging director, however, he had difficulty securing funding to make a feature film, and he turned to other jobs for a number of years.

In 2011 he published the novel Mimi. In 2013, the novel won the Prix du roman gai for the best LGBT-themed novel published in France and Belgium in the previous five years. He subsequently collaborated with Caroline Lunoir, Fanny Saintenoy and Anne-Sophie Stefanini on the collective novel Qu4tre, and published the novella Une vie de petits-fours and the graphic novel Salaire net et monde de brutes, which was inspired by his own employment history of short-term and temporary work.

Faultless (Irréprochable), his feature directorial debut, was released in 2016. He followed up with School's Out (L'Heure de la sortie) in 2018, and The Origin of Evil in 2022.

The Origin of Evil was the winner of the Audience Award for Narrative Features at the 2023 Frameline Film Festival.

== Filmography ==
=== Director and writer ===
Year	Title	Role	Notes
2002	The Good Old Naughty Days (Polissons et Galipettes)	Director and writer	Collaboration with Michel Reilhac
2002	The Main Game (Le Grand Avoir)	Director and writer	Co-written and directed with Élise Griffon (short film)
2003	Handsome Jack (Le Beau Jacques)	Director and writer	Co-written and directed with Élise Griffon (short film)
2016	Faultless (Irréprochable)	Director and writer	
2018	School's Out (L'Heure de la sortie)	Director and writer	
2022	The Origin of Evil (L'Origine du mal)	Director and writer	

=== Writer ===
Year	Title	Role	Notes
2016	Salaire net et monde de brut	Writer	Television series for Arte, written with Élise Griffon
