= Hugo Gélin =

French film director, producer and screenwriter (born 1980)

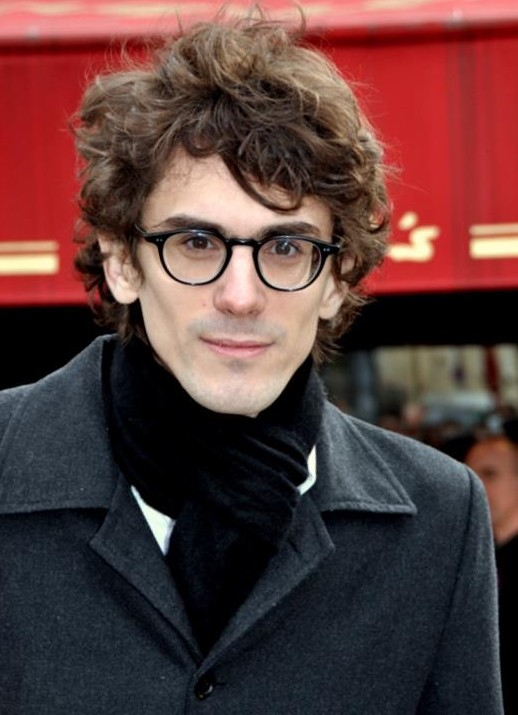
- Gélin in 2013
- Born: 4 May 1980 (age 46); Paris, France
- Occupations: Film director, screenwriter, producer
- Years active: 1985–present

Hugo Gélin (born 4 May 1980) is a French film director, producer and screenwriter.

== Life and career ==
Hugo Gélin was born to Xavier Gélin on May 4, 1980. His grandparents are Daniel Gélin, Danièle Delorme and Ray Ventura, uncle of Sacha Distel. His aunts and uncles are actors Maria Schneider, Manuel Gélin and Fiona Gélin. He made two brief appearances as a child actor, and later started working as an assistant director and camera operator. He directed his first short in 2001 and his first feature film in 2012.

== Filmography ==
=== As an actor ===
- Lune de miel (1985)
- Tant qu'il y aura des femmes (1987)

=== As a director ===
- La Vie sans secret (short film, 2001)
- A l’abri des regards indiscrets (short film, 2002)
- Just Like Brothers (2012)
- Demain tout commence (2016)
- Mon inconnue (2019)

=== As a producer ===
- Comme des frères (2012)
- 'La Cage Dorée (2013)

=== As a screenwriter ===
- La Vie sans secret (short film, 2001)
- A l’abri des regards indiscrets (short film, 2002)
- Just Like Brothers (2012)
- 'La Cage Dorée (2013)
- Demain tout commence (2016)
- Mon inconnue (2019)
