= Lannick Gautry =

French actor (born 1976)

- Born: 3 March 1976 (age 50); Saint-Germain-en-Laye, Yvelines, France
- Occupation: Actor
- Years active: 2005–present

Lannick Gautry (born 3 March 1976) is a French actor.

== Theater ==
Year	Title	Director	Writer	Notes
2008	Croque-monsieur	Alain Sachs	Marcel Mithois	Théâtre des Variétés
2009	Tout le monde aime Juliette	Josiane Balasko	Josiane Balasko	Le Splendid

== Filmography ==
Year	Title	Role	Director	Notes	Ref.
2005	Brice de Nice	Arnaud de Lacanau	James Huth		
2005	Russian Dolls	Snowboarder	Cédric Klapisch		
2006	Nos jours heureux	Daniel	Éric Toledano and Olivier Nakache		
2006	David Nolande	Romain	Nicolas Cuche	TV series (2 episodes)	
2007	Hellphone	Policeman Fritz	James Huth (2)		
2007	Un admirateur secret	Bruno	Christian Bonnet	TV movie	
2007	Section de recherches	Laurent Alonso	Jean-Luc Breitenstein	TV series (1 episode)	
2008	R.I.S, police scientifique	Stéphane	Christophe Barbier	TV series (1 episode)	
2008	Boulevard du Palais	Richard Pessoa	Christian Bonnet (2)	TV series (1 episode)	
2009	Tellement proches	The Judo's teacher	Éric Toledano and Olivier Nakache (2)		
2009	District 13: Ultimatum	The cool friend	Patrick Alessandrin		
2009	Celle que j'aime	Steph	Élie Chouraqui		
2009	Jusqu'à toi	Jeff	Jennifer Devoldère		
2009	Une place à prendre	The Lover	Charles Meurisse	Short	
2009	Juste un peu d'@mour	Nicolas	Nicolas Herdt	TV movie	
2009	Obsession(s)	Lucas Prudhomm	Frédéric Tellier	TV movie	
2009	Le juge est une femme	Michaël Landrin	François Velle	TV series (1 episode)	
2010	Le sel		Julie Ropars	Short	
2010	Les Petits Meurtres d'Agatha Christie	Mathieu Vidal	Eric Woreth	TV series (1 episode)	
2010	Les Invincibles	Marc	Alexandre Castagnetti & Pierric Gantelmi d'Ille	TV series (3 episodes)	
2010	Maison Close	Edgar	Mabrouk El Mechri	TV series (4 episodes)	
2011	A Happy Event	Camille Rose	Rémi Bezançon		
2011	Halal police d'État	Claude Boutboul	Rachid Dhibou		
2011	Kënu		Álvarez Pastor		
2011	Violence elle seule	The Man	Éric Capitaine	Short	
2011	Dans la peau d'une grande	Marc	Pascal Lahmani	TV movie	
2011	Insoupçonnable	Marco	Benoît d'Aubert	TV movie	
2011	Longue peine	Gilbert Verdier	Christian Bonnet (3)	TV movie	
2012	Comme des frères	Vassily	Hugo Gélin		
2012	Plan de table	Eric	Christelle Raynal		
2012	Moi à ton âge	Aubert	Bruno Garcia	TV movie	
2012	Nom de code : Rose	François Xavier Baudat	Arnauld Mercadier	TV movie	
2012	Chambre 327	Clément Ognard	Benoît d'Aubert (2)	TV mini-series	
2012	Jeu de dames	Cédric Delorgeril	François Guérin	TV series (6 episodes)	
2013	The Gilded Cage	Charles Caillaux	Ruben Alves	CinEuphoria Awards for Best Ensemble - National Competition	
2013	Un enfant en danger	Fabien	Jérôme Cornuau	TV movie	
2013	WorkinGirls	The Handsome	Sylvain Fusée	TV series (11 episodes)	
2014	Les Francis	Jeff	Fabrice Begotti		
2014	La loi	Rémy Bourdon	Christian Faure	TV movie	
2014	Le sang de la vigne	Manuel	Marc Rivière	TV series (1 episode)	
2015	I Kissed a Girl	Antoine	Noémie Saglio & Maxime Govare		
2015	Premiers crus	Marco	Jérôme Le Gris		
2015	Le mystère du lac	Clovis Bouvier	Jérôme Cornuau (2)	TV mini-series	
2016	Harcelée	Antoine	Virginie Wagon	TV movie	
2016	Fais pas ci, fais pas ça	Benoit	Philippe Lefebvre	TV series (1 episode)	
2016	La vengeance aux yeux clairs	Yann Legoff	David Morlet	TV series (8 episodes)	
2017	Murders at Dunkerque	Eric Dampierre	Marwen Abdallah	TV movie	
2017	Le tueur du lac	Clovis	Jérôme Cornuau (3)	TV mini-series	
2020	Peur sur le lac	Clovis Bouvier	Jérôme Cornuau	TV mini-series	
2021	Flashback	Marquis de Condorcet	Caroline Vigneaux		
2022-2023	Vise le coeur (2 seasons)	Novak Lisica	Vincent Jamain, Jérémy Minui	TV mini-series	
