= Joséphine de Meaux =

French actress and director (born 1977)

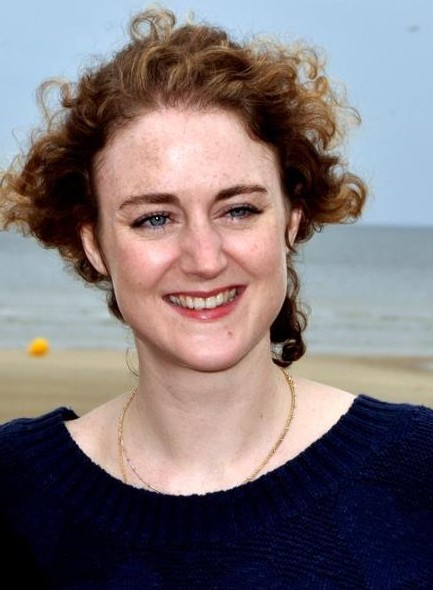
- Joséphine de Meaux in 2012
- Born: January 23, 1977 (age 49); Boulogne-Billancourt, Hauts-de-Seine, France
- Occupations: Actress, Director
- Years active: 1998–present

Joséphine de Meaux is a French actress and director.

== Biography ==
Joséphine de Meaux was born in Boulogne-Billancourt, Hauts-de-Seine, France. She studied at the French National Academy of Dramatic Arts from 1999 to 2002, acting in several plays.

Joséphine de Meaux started her career in theatre as an actor and director, and then moved to film. She made her on-screen debut in 2003, with the movie Who Killed Bambi?, directed by Gilles Marchand. The film was screened out of competition at the 2003 Cannes Film Festival.

In 2012, she direct her first short movie called Crazy Pink Limo. In 2019, she released her first motion picture as a director, a comedy titled Les petits flocons. She appeared in the comedies Those Happy Days, Tellement proches and The Intouchables, all three directed by Éric Toledano and Olivier Nakache. She also appeared in Vilaine, Case départ and more recently L'Élève Ducobu.

== Theatre ==
=== As actress ===
Year	Title	Author	Director
1998	Beckett, Adamov : les insurgés de l'amertume	Edmond Tamiz	Edmond Tamiz
1998	Parcours des premières insolences d'une révolution à venir	Unknown	Jean-Louis Martin-Barbaz
1999	...W...	Vincent Macaigne	Vincent Macaigne
1999	Friends	Kōbō Abe	Abel Perraudin
2000	Minuscules	Judith Siboni	Judith Siboni
2000	The Greeks	Mark Sanders & Ros Steen	Alexander Gibson
2001	Requiem	Vincent Macaigne	Vincent Macaigne
2001	The Wedding	Anton Chekhov	Sébastien Eveno
2001	Feydeau Georges Courteline	Virginie Vivès	Virginie Vivès
2001	Voilà, ce que jamais je ne te dirai	Vincent Macaigne	Vincent Macaigne
2002	Ubu Roi	Alfred Jarry	Claude Buchwald
2002	The King Stag	Carlo Gozzi	Joséphine de Meaux
2002	Premiers jours	Pascal Sangla	Pascal Sangla
2002	À Moscou ! À Moscou !	Anton Chekhov	Joël Jouanneau
2003	Medea	Euripides	Joséphine de Meaux
2003	The Europeans	Howard Barker	Nathalie Garraud
2003	Les Repas HYC	Christophe Huysman	Christophe Huysman
2004	Choses tendres	Marie de Beaumont	Olivier Schneider
2004	Manque et autre textes	Sarah Kane	Vincent Macaigne
2004-05	Qui ne travaille pas, ne mange pas	Judith Depaule	Judith Depaule
2005	L'Échange	Paul Claudel	Joséphine de Meaux
2005	Friche 22.66	Vincent Macaigne	Vincent Macaigne
2007	L'équilibre de la croix	Valère Novarina	Joséphine de Meaux
2009	Le Bug	Richard Strand	Beata Nilska
2009	As You Like It	William Shakespeare	Daniel Hurstel
2010	La Dispute	Pierre de Marivaux	Muriel Mayette-Holtz
2011	La Pyramide	Copi	Joséphine de Meaux
2013-19	Orphans	Dennis Kelly	Chloé Dabert
2014	Nulle part à l'heure	Alexandra Cismondi	Alexandra Cismondi
2016	Chat en poche	Georges Feydeau	Frédéric Bélier-Garcia
2019	Palace sur scène	Jean-Michel Ribes & Jean-Marie Gourio	Jean-Michel Ribes
2021	Feuilleton Goldoni	Carlo Goldoni	Muriel Mayette-Holtz
2022	La Cuisse du steward	Jean-Michel Ribes	Mériam Korichi & Joséphine de Meaux
2023	Sur la côte sud	Fredrik Brattberg	Frédéric Bélier-Garcia

=== As director ===
Year	Title	Author
2002	The King Stag	Carlo Gozzi
2003	Medea	Euripides
2005	L'Échange	Paul Claudel
2007	L'équilibre de la croix	Valère Novarina
2011	La Pyramide	Copi
2022	La Cuisse du steward	Jean-Michel Ribes

== Filmography ==
=== Actress ===
Year	Title	Role	Director	Notes
2003	Who Killed Bambi ?	The mute nurse	Gilles Marchand	
2003	Avocats et associés	Béatrice Vanoli	Alexandre Pidoux	TV series (1 episode)
2005	Regular Lovers		Philippe Garrel	
2005	Josephine, Guardian Angel	The mailwoman	Philippe Monnier	TV series (1 episode)
2006	Those Happy Days	Caroline	Éric Toledano and Olivier Nakache	Alpe d'Huez International Comedy Film Festival - Best Acting
2007	Tragédie en direct		Marc Rivière	TV movie
2008	Vilaine	Blandine	Jean-Patrick Benes & Allan Mauduit	
2009	Shoe at Your Foot	The hostess	Jennifer Devoldère	
2009	Tellement proches	Roxane	Éric Toledano and Olivier Nakache	
2009	La reine et le cardinal	Madame de Motteville	Marc Rivière	TV movie
2010	Thelma, Louise et Chantal	Sophie	Benoît Pétré	
2010	Pas de politique à table		Valérie Minetto	TV movie
2011	Delicacy	Sophie	David & Stéphane Foenkinos	
2011	Case départ	Joséphine Jourdain	Lionel Steketee, Fabrice Éboué & Thomas N'Gijol	
2011	L'Élève Ducobu	Miss Rateau	Philippe de Chauveron	
2011	The Intouchables	Nathalie Lecomte	Éric Toledano and Olivier Nakache	
2011	Nobody Else But You	Cathy	Gérald Hustache-Mathieu	Nominated - Festival Jean Carmet - Best Supporting Actress
2011	Quatre colombes sur l'antenne télé	Joséphine	Martin Tronquart	Short
2012	Le Jour de la grenouille	Anna Brahé	Béatrice Pollet	
2012	Les vacances de Ducobu	Miss Rateau	Philippe de Chauveron	
2012	Renée...	Eva	Jézabel Marques	Short
2012	Crazy Pink Limo	Juliette	Joséphine de Meaux	Short
2012	On s'en fout		Laurie Thinot	TV movie
2012	Merlin	Lady of the Lake	Stéphane Kappes	TV mini-series
2013	Braconnière	Angélique	Martin Tronquart	Short
2014	Gazelles	Judith	Mona Achache	
2014	Le marché de l'em(pl)oi	Ariane	Madeleine Guillo & Stéphanie Halfon	Short
2015	Dheepan	Headmistress	Jacques Audiard	
2015	Learn by Heart	The CPE	Mathieu Vadepied	
2017	Daddy Cool	Eloïse	Maxime Govare	
2017	Pour le réconfort	Joséphine	Vincent Macaigne	
2017	Peau-rouge	Diane	Maya Haffar	Short
2018	Peines Perdues	Burgaud	Benjamin Charbit	Short
2018-22	50 nuances de Grecs	Aphrodite	Mathieu Signolet	TV series (27 episodes)
2019	Les petits flocons	Wanda	Joséphine de Meaux	
2019	Mon combat	Anne	Rudy Milstein	Short
2020	The Bureau	Fulvia	Anna Novion	TV series (1 episode)
2020-22	César Wagner	Frédérique Koehler	Antoine Garceau & Bruno Garcia	TV series (5 episodes)
2021	Les fantasmes	Mélanie	David & Stéphane Foenkinos	
2021	Mes très chers enfants	Valérie	Alexandra Leclère	
2021	Kenavo	Luna	Maël Caradec	Short
2021	Têtard	The inmate	Lola Roqueplo & Jérémie Sein	TV series (1 episode)
2022	Tout le monde ment	Malory Servaz	Hélène Angel	TV movie
2022	Platonique	Karen	Élie Girard & Camille Rosset	TV mini-series
2023	Le clan	Jocelyne Bompart	Eric Fraticelli	
2023	Les randonneuses	Karen	Frédéric Berthe	TV mini-series
TBA	Un homme de principe		Ivan Calbérac	Post-Production
TBA	Tout le monde ment 2	Malory Servaz	Akim Isker	TV movie Post-Production
TBA	Lycée Toulouse-Lautrec	Sophie	Cathy Verney & Shirley Monsarrat	TV series Post-Production

=== Director / Writer ===
Year	Title	Notes
2012	Crazy Pink Limo	Short
2015	La mélancolie des Télésièges	Documentary
2019	Les petits flocons	
