= Proof of Love =

Proof of Love may refer to:

- Proof of Love, 2008 album by Old Man Luedecke
- "Proof of Love", song by Paul Simon from Stranger to Stranger
- "Proof of Love", season 2 episode of R.I.S, police scientifique
- "Proof of Love", English title of "Aishō" or "Aishou", B-side of the single "But/Aishō" from Koda Kumi
- "Prueba de Amor" (English: "Proof of Love"), a song by Mexican band El Tri from No Podemos Volar
- "Proof of Love", a "one-woman" stage play written by Chisa Hutchinson.
