= Claudia Tagbo =

French-Ivorian actress and comedian

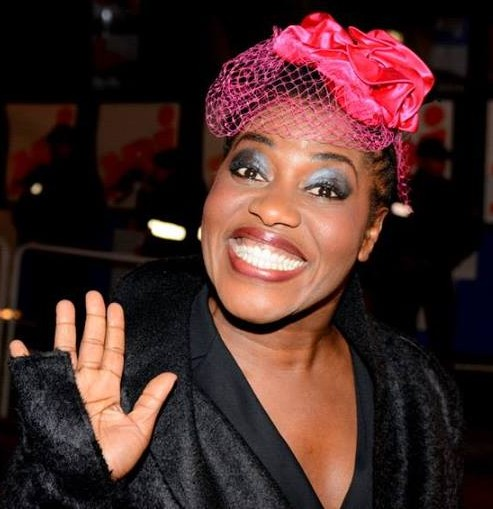
- Tagbo in 2013
- Born: 14 June 1973 (age 53); Abidjan, Ivory Coast
- Occupations: Actress, TV presenter

Claudia Tagbo (born 14 June 1973) is a French-Ivorian actress, comedian and TV personality.

== Early life ==
Claudia Tagbo was born in Abidjan, Ivory Coast in 1973.

== Filmography ==
Year	Title	Role	Director	Notes
2001	Pas d'histoires!		Émilie Deleuze	
2001	Fatou la Malienne	Hawa	Daniel Vigne	TV movie
2002	Mama Aloko		Jean Odoutan	
2004	La dictée		Meiji U Tum'si	Short
2004	La valse des gros derrières	Assiba	Jean Odoutan	
2004	Les anges malicieux		Frédéric Monpierre	Short
2005	Ma meilleure amie	Bertine	Élisabeth Rappeneau	TV movie
2006	Le tuteur	Midwife	Édouard Molinaro	TV series (1 episode)
2006	Congorama	Alice Roy	Philippe Falardeau	
2006-2010	R.I.S, police scientifique	Lieutenant Martine Forest	Various	TV series (47 episodes)
2007	Tony Zoreil	Member jazz band	Valentin Potier	Short
2007	Porte-à-porte		Jean-Pascal Gautier	Short
2007	Chrysalis	The nurse	Julien Leclercq	
2007	Ma vie n'est pas une comédie romantique	The Customs	Marc Gibaja	
2008	Boulevard du Palais	Madame Wakalo	Christian Bonnet	TV series (1 episode)
2008	Ca$h	The Secretary	Éric Besnard	
2008	Sex, Okra and Salted Butter	Bintou	Mahamat Saleh Haroun	TV movie
2008	Vilaine	Mom at the airport	Jean-Patrick Benes & Allan Mauduit	
2009	Tongs et paréo	Noémie	Philippe Giangreco & Gwendal Pointeau	TV series
2009	Pina Colada	Claudia	Alice Winocour	Short
2009	Omar	Omar's mother	Sébastien Gabriel	Short
2009	Inside Jamel Comedy Club	Herself	Olivier Braunstein	TV show (9 episodes)
2010	La vénitienne	Lieutenant Maguy	Saara Saarela	TV movie
2010	Au bas de l'échelle	Stephe	Arnauld Mercadier	TV movie
2010	À vos caisses	Arsène	Pierre Isoard	TV movie
2010	Le sentiment de la chair	Djibril's friend	Roberto Garzelli	
2011	Camping paradis	Sister Constance	Philippe Proteau	TV series (1 episode)
2011	J'aurais pu être une pute		Baya Kasmi	Short
2011	Le client	Falco	Arnauld Mercadier	TV movie
2011	De l'huile sur le feu	The nurse	Nicolas Benamou	
2012	Schengen	Ines	Annarita Zambrano	Short
2012	La collection donne de la voi(e)x	Ines	Annarita Zambrano	TV series (1 episode)
2012	Crapuleuses	Madame Pilat	Magaly Richard-Serrano	TV movie
2012	Clem	The Director of the crib	Joyce Buñuel	TV series (2 episodes)
2012	Une Estonienne à Paris	Caretaker	Ilmar Raag	
2012	Manipulations	Laura Silvano	Laurent Herbiet	TV movie
2012	Les seigneurs	Fatou N'Dogo	Olivier Dahan	
2012	Victorine	Victorine	Garance Meillon	
2013	Mon Frigo m'a dit		Francis Coté	TV mini-series
2013	Aya de Yopougon	Jeanne / Alphonsine	Marguerite Abouet & Clément Oubrerie	
2013	C'est la crise	Claudia	David Freymond	TV series (15 episodes)
2013	Lanester	Léonie Saint-Martin	Franck Mancuso	TV movie
2014	Get Well Soon	Myriam	Jean Becker	
2014	Le crocodile du Botswanga	Jacqueline	Lionel Steketee & Fabrice Eboué	
2014	Amour sur place ou à emporter	The Taxi	Amelle Chahbi	
2014	WorkinGirls	Brigitte	Sylvain Fusée	TV series (1 episode)
2014	Presque parfaite	Julia	Gabriel Julien-Laferrière	TV series (1 episode)
2015	Nos chers voisins	Françoise Gairoard	Emmanuel Rigaut	TV series (2 episodes)
2015	I'm All Yours	Ebène	Baya Kasmi	
2015	Up & Down	Bommart	Ernesto Oña	TV movie
2016	We Are Family	Babette	Gabriel Julien-Laferrière	

== Theatre ==
Year	Title	Author	Director	Notes
2011	Claudia Comedy Gospel	Claudia Tagbo	Fabrice Éboué	One Woman Show
2012-14	Crazy	Claudia Tagbo	Fabrice Éboué	One Woman Show
