= Bouzidi =

Bouzidi (Arabic: بوزيدي) is an Arabic surname. Notable people with the surname include:

- Carole Bouzidi (born 1985), French-Algerian slalom canoeist
- Mourad Bouzidi (born 1984), Dutch-Tunisian heavyweight kickboxer
- Rédouane Hennouni-Bouzidi (born 1989), French Paralympic athlete
- Said El Bouzidi (born 1967), Moroccan basketball coach
- Wahid Bouzidi (1978–2023), French comedian and actor
- Youcef Bouzidi (1957–2024), Algerian football manager
