= Brattberg =

Brattberg is a surname. Notable people with the surname include:

- Fredrik Brattberg (born 1978), Norwegian playwright
- Johan Brattberg (born 1996), Swedish footballer
