= Tellement proches =

2009 French film

- Theatrical release poster
- Directed by: Éric Toledano; Olivier Nakache
- Written by: Éric Toledano; Olivier Nakache
- Produced by: Nicolas Duval-Adassovsky; Yann Zenou
- Starring: Vincent Elbaz; Isabelle Carré; François-Xavier Demaison; Audrey Dana; Omar Sy; Joséphine de Meaux
- Cinematography: Rémy Chevrin
- Edited by: Dorian Rigal-Ansous
- Music by: Frédéric Talgorn
- Production company: Quad Productions
- Distributed by: Mars Distribution
- Release dates: January 2009 (L'Alpe d'Huez); 17 June 2009
- Running time: 102 minutes
- Country: France
- Language: French
- Budget: $7.8 million
- Box office: $6.7 million

Tellement proches (lit. 'So close') is a 2009 French film directed by Éric Toledano and Olivier Nakache, starring Vincent Elbaz, Isabelle Carré, François-Xavier Demaison, Audrey Dana, Omar Sy, and Joséphine de Meaux.

== Synopsis ==
Tellement proches is the story of Alain, who marries Nathalie and is forced to wrestle with the reality of his new in-law family, with all their combined eccentricities.

== Cast ==
- Vincent Elbaz as Alain
- Isabelle Carré as Nathalie
- François-Xavier Demaison as Jean-Pierre
- Audrey Dana as Catherine
- Omar Sy as Bruno
- Joséphine de Meaux as Roxane
- Jean Benguigui as Prosper
- Catherine Hosmalin as Nicole
- Lionel Abelanski as Charly
- Lizzie Brocheré as Clara
- Valérie Karsenti as Chantal
- Max Clavelly as Lucien
- Matthieu Boujenah as Old Lucien
- Ary Abittan as Moshé Benhamou
- Talina Boyaci as Gaëlle
- Arsène Mosca as Patrice
- Laurence Février as Colette
- Jean-Pierre Clami as Étienne
- Laurentine Milebo as Fatou
- Renée Le Calm as Geneviève Grimperai
- Alain Guillo as Jérôme Lefèvre
- Éric Naggar as Monsieur Kadoche
- Wahid Bouzidi as Redo
- Soufiane Guerrab as Francky
- François Toumarkine as Langueteau
- Guy Faucher as Roger
- Raphaël Toledano as Maurice
- Jade Samba-Seale as Juliette
- Karunakaran Nair as Farath
- Elmo Desmond Wjesundera as Elmo
- Lannick Gautry as Judo's teacher
- Charlie Dupont as Pottery's teacher
- Géraldine Nakache as The religious
- Lise Lamétrie as Director of the nursery
