= Frédéric Talgorn =

French composer for film and television (born 1961)

Frédéric Talgorn (born 2 July 1961 in Toulouse, France) is a French composer for film and television.

He studied music at the Conservatoire de Paris where his teachers included Sabine Lacoraet and Yvonne Loriod, but he completed his studies on his own. In 1987 he moved to the United States where he began to compose film music. He also wrote the official music to accompany the Olympic flame for the 1992 Winter Olympic Games. Notable film scores include Edge of Sanity (1989), Delta Force 2: The Colombian Connection (1990), Robot Jox (1990), Fortress (1992) and The Temp (1993). He also has an extensive catalogue of concert music, and has often conducted his own works in concert and recording sessions. He has also conducted and recorded film scores of others with the Royal Scottish National Orchestra.

== Selected works ==
=== Concert Scores ===
- Mosaïque for Piano (Dedicated to Tuyêt Pham) - 2026
- Unveiling for solo Trombone and Brass Quintet (Dedicated to Spanish Brass)
- Verschleierung For Piano, Bandonéon, Violin, Cello & Contrabass (Dedicated to The Mafalda Ensemble) - 2025
- Concerto for Trumpet - Publisher: Editions Marc reift (Dedicated to Thierry Caens) - 2016
- Stances for Violin and Harp (Dedicated to Anne Ménier and Christine Icart)
- Elegy for solo double bass and strings (Dedicated to Daniel Marillier)
- Petite suite dans les idées for orchestra (Radio France commission)
- Mandala for solio violin and orchestra
- Olympus, for brass and percussion
- Vinum et Sanguinem - Cantata for choir, soloists, and small orchestra - 1993
- Concerto for Percussion and Orchestra (1997)

=== Television Scores ===
- Young Indiana Jones (1992-93)
- The Little Prince (2010)

=== Film Scores ===
- Tellement proches (2009)
- Trouble at Timpetill (2008)
- Asterix at the Olympic Games (2008)
- Molière (2007)
- Président (2007)
- Les Aiguilles Rouges (2007)
- Those Happy Days (2006)
- Anthony Zimmer (2005)
- RRRrrrr!!! (2004)
- Laisse tes mains sur mes hanches (2003)
- Heavy Metal 2000 (2000)
- The Devil's Arithmetic (1999)
- Angels in the Endzone (1997)
- A Rat's Tale (1997)
- The Temp (1993)
- Fortress (1992)
- Le Brasier (1991)
- Delta Force 2: The Colombian Connection (1990)
- Robot Jox (1990)
- Edge of Sanity (1989)
