= Wahid Bouzidi =

French comedian and actor (1978–2023)

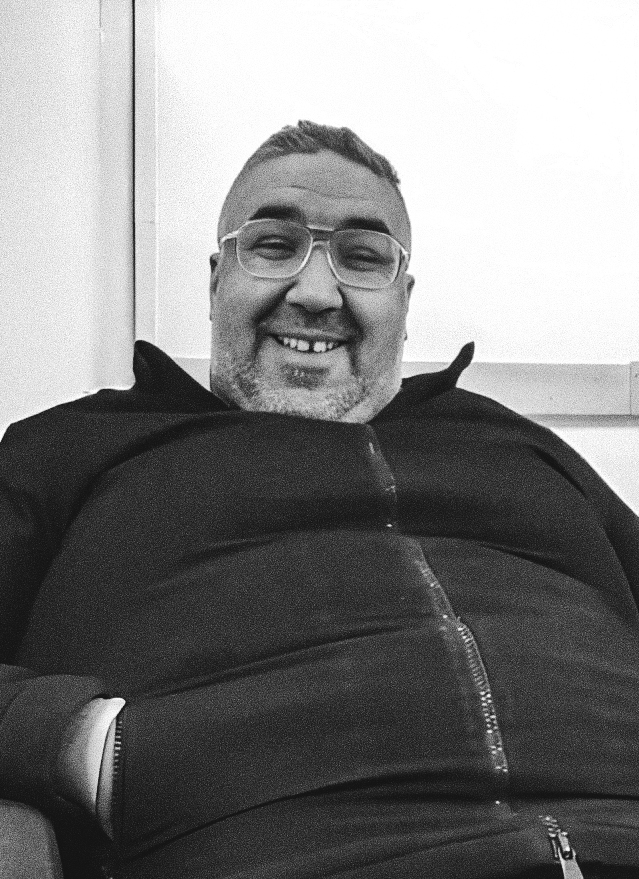
- Bouzidi in 2022
- Born: 9 July 1978; Villepinte, Seine-Saint-Denis, France
- Died: 20 August 2023 (aged 45); Marrakesh, Morocco
- Occupation(s): Comedian, actor
- Notable credit: Jamel Comedy Club

Wahid Bouzidi (9 July 1978 – 20 August 2023) was a French comedian and actor. He was known for his roles in Tellement proches, Case départ, and Super-héros malgré lui.

== Biography ==
Wahid Bouzidi, born on July 9, 1978, in Dugny, was a French-Algerian comedian. He lost his mother, then his father two months later, when he was only 15 years old. He was subsequently raised in Noisy-le-Sec by his older brother Ahmed, who became his legal guardian.

== Death ==
On August 16, 2023, Wahid Bouzidi suffered another stroke while on vacation in Marrakech, which left him in a coma. He died four days later, on August 20, 2023, at the age of 45. He was subsequently buried in Algeria, near Tolga, a town located not far from Biskra.
