= WorkinGirls =

- Genre: Comedy
- Written by: Frank Bellocq; Béatrice Fournera; Eve-Sophie Santerre; Karine Angeli
- Directed by: Sylvain Fusée
- Starring: Claude Perron; Laurence Arné; Blanche Gardin; Vanessa David; Alice Belaïdi; Clémence Faure
- Country of origin: France
- Original language: French
- No. of series: 4
- No. of episodes: 49

Production
- Producer: Gaëlle Cholet
- Production location: France
- Cinematography: Michel Hazard
- Editors: Antoine Moreau; Gregory Lefevre
- Running time: 13 minutes
- Production companies: Canal+ Gazelle & Cie

Original release
- Network: Canal+
- Release: April 19, 2012 - December 26, 2016

Workingirls is a French television series, broadcast since April 19, 2012 on Canal +.

== Premise ==
WorkinGirls describes the daily life of a company which employs six girls and which records their behavior: Karine, the sadistic director, Nathalie, the mother with a large family, the psychologically disturbed Helen, Deborah, the nymphomaniac, and Sophie, the welcoming but very lazy switchboard operator.

== Cast and characters ==
=== Main ===
- Claude Perron as Karine Brontier (Season 1-4)
- Laurence Arné as Déborah Vernon (Season 1-4)
- Blanche Gardin as Hélène Grilloux (Season 1-3)
- Vanessa David as Nathalie Roneaudi (Season 1-4)
- Alice Belaïdi as Sophie Marteauni (Season 1-4)
- Clémence Faure as Sophie Martineau (Season 1-4)

=== Recurring ===
- Franck Bellocq as Bernard (Season 1-3)
- Pascal Stencel as Jean-Luc (Season 1-3)
- Cybèle Villemagne as Joëlle (Season 1-3)
- Edith le Merdy as Maria (Season 1-3)
- Ludovic Pinette as Michel (Season 1-3)
- Dimitri Rataud as Karine's lover (Season 1-2)
- Lannick Gautry as The Handsome (Season 2-3)
- Audrey Lamy as Stéphanie Levasseur (Season 2-3)
- Didier Jean as Loïc (Season 2-3)
- Monsieur Poulpe as Pierrick (Season 2-3)
- Catherine Duros as Cathy (Season 2-3)
- Anne Marivin as Michèle Coignard (Season 3)

=== Guest ===
- Alban Lenoir as Window cleaner
- Bérengère Krief as Cécile
- Brice Fournier as Duverneuil
- Camille Chamoux as The psychologist
- Claudia Tagbo as Brigitte
- Gianni Giardinelli as A patient
- Olivia Côte as Carole
- Sabine Pakora as Corinne

== Episodes ==
=== Season 1 (2012) ===
The first season premiered on Canal+ on April 19, 2012. The season finale aired on May 10, 2012.

1. Retour de couches
2. Le label
3. La grande famille
4. L'anniversaire de Karine
5. La conquête de l'Orient
6. Bonnet C
7. Élections internes
8. Mon beau stagiaire
9. La fusion
10. Les parasites
11. Panne de clim
12. La journée de la secrétaire

=== Season 2 (2013) ===
The second season premiered on Canal+ on June 13, 2013. The season finale aired on July 4, 2013.

1. Le Déménagement
2. Deb in love
3. La visite médicale
4. Les Catherinettes
5. Le plan de licenciement
6. La nouvelle Nathalie
7. Cost killer
8. New management
9. La grève
10. L'âge de raison
11. Lipdub
12. La tour infernale

=== Season 3 (2014) ===
The third season premiered on Canal+ on February 20, 2014. The season finale aired on March 13, 2014.

1. Le Suicide
2. Cellule Psychologique
3. Le Calendrier
4. Tolérance Zéro
5. La Rumeur
6. La Saint-Valentin
7. Stage de survie
8. Reportage
9. Le grand audit
10. Restore Hope
11. Les investisseurs Indiens
12. This is la fin

=== Season 4 (2017) ===
The fourth season premiered on Canal+ on 2017.

== Accolades ==
Year	Award	Category	Recipient	Result
2013	International Emmy Awards	Comedy	Canal +	Nominated

== Home media release ==
- The season 1 & 2 were released in France on DVD on July 9, 2013.
- The season 3 was released in France on DVD on October 1, 2014.

== Adaptations ==
Workingirls is freely adapted from a Dutch series, Toren C.

The series was adapted in Quebec under the title Complex G, and takes place in the Marie-Guyart Building (commonly called Complex G) in Quebec City. Filming takes place in spring 2014.
