= Cash (2008 film) =

- Original movie poster
- Directed by: Eric Besnard
- Written by: Eric Besnard
- Produced by: Luc Bossi; Patrice Ledoux
- Starring: Jean Dujardin; Jean Reno; Valeria Golino; Alice Taglioni
- Cinematography: Gilles Henry
- Edited by: Christophe Pinel
- Music by: Jean-Michel Bernard
- Production company: Pulsar Productions
- Distributed by: TFM Distribution (France)
- Release date: 23 April 2008 (France)
- Running time: 100 minutes
- Country: France
- Languages: French; English
- Budget: $13.7 million
- Box office: $21 million

Cash (sometimes stylised as Ca$h) is a French crime caper film from 2008, directed by Eric Besnard and starring Jean Dujardin, Jean Reno, Valeria Golino and Alice Taglioni.

== Plot ==
A cleaner goes into the office of a banker. He tells the staff to leave then proceeds to change into a suit and place a picture on the desk of two brothers. Lardier, a courier, arrives and the man proceeds to explain to him that he has several financial options available. However a cell phone rings and Lardier hands it over to the man. The caller, who is angry, shouts down the phone. Uncomfortable the man tries to leave but is shot with a silenced pistol several times by Lardier. The man who died was the brother of Cash.

Cash is under surveillance by Lieutenant Julia Molina from Interpol. He is part of a gang who are running a confidence trick on a group of mercenaries – led by Letallec – who think they are buying impeccable printing plates for counterfeiting Euros. On returning to her headquarters, she is informed by her boss, Barnes, that another senior agent, Finley, are both in the running for his job. She asks if she can follow Cash in order to get an arrest that would help her promotional chances. Molina also discovers that Maxime, a master-criminal, is back in town and that her rival has an investigative advantage.

Molina then observes Cash as he begins work on his next victim, Garance, a wealthy heiress. However the mercenaries – who have discovered that the plates are fake – catch up with Cash forcing him to flee through the streets. Molina eventually catches up with Cash in her surveillance vehicle and offers to hide him inside. She then uses this opportunity to force him to take her into his confidence.

Cash explains he is running a con on the wealthy father of this heiress. He asks Molina to accompany him to a charity auction the man is hosting at his home in the country. Following the event, in which Cash paid €18,000 to help protect a hippopotamus in Africa because he started to have feelings for the daughter, the rich father is revealed to be none other than Maxime who ran the charity auction as his own con on Cash and his gang. His "daughter", who turns out to be one of his gang, berates Cash for being such a sucker for love. Maxime also explains that the con was to see whether Cash was smart enough to join his own gang; but he failed. He is told that another man, named Vincent, will have his role. In revenge Cash loses at poker in order to palm off a few fake euro notes to the gloating Vincent, who is picked up later trying to use them at racecourse.

Cash then gets the call that he will join the gang. Maxime explains that they are to do a heist on the French Riviera. They are going to steal €30million worth of untraceable diamonds from a ruthless South African mine owner who is going to use the stones to pay his mercenary army that protects and controls his business interests. Maxime runs through an elaborate plan – to break into the hotel's vault – where each team members plays a pivotal role. In a private moment, Maxime also reveals that he knows Molina's real identity but states she can join in and get her share if she helps.

But when Molina returns to Interpol she is greeted by LeBlanc and LeBrun, two charmless agents from Interpol's Internal Affairs division in Brussels, who are looking into the backgrounds of the candidates seeking promotion. They question Molina about her investigations and her methods. They also mention that they are looking into rumors that some of the money seized in raids had gone missing. Molina goes to the pool hall owned by Cash's mentor, François. Cash explains that Maxime now needs all of them for the job. Barnes and Finley pick up Lardier after a tip off. During questioning they start to get around to the killing at the bank a year before. Molina finds LeBlanc and LeBrun waiting in her flat after trashing it looking for evidence in their own investigations.

The gang has rigged the hotel with CCTV and ask Molina to monitor them. However the mercenaries that bought the fake counterfeiting plates turn up and grab Cash. Seizing the moment that this commotion brings, François goes to the South African mine owner's room with a gun to grab the diamonds. François explains that his gang is double-crossing Maxime while they go down to the hotel vault. The jewels were never placed in any safe, they are really in the South African's room. Molina says she will go with him. But just outside the door she takes François' gun. The Interpol agent then enters the room, pistol whips a guard, and takes the jewel case for herself. After being tripped by a little boy, she eventually escapes in one of the gang's waiting boat but not before shooting one of them on the way.

The little boy walks up to Garance and cries "mummy" who is then joined by Cash. The con is then explained. Maxime was working with Cash to set up Molina because she ordered Lardier to kill Cash's brother. He died because she realised he was conning her out of the money she had accumulated from skimming confiscated loot taken in her Interpol raids. When she tripped, the gang switched the jewel case. Molina now realises she's been set up for the robbery and the mercenaries are intent on killing her. The entire gang, including Letallec and Vincent, gather on the hotel terrace and toast themselves and Cash's dead brother.

== Cast ==
- Jean Dujardin as Cash
- Jean Reno as Maxime (Dubreuil)
- Valeria Golino as Lieutenant Julia Molina
- Alice Taglioni as Garance
- François Berléand as François
- Caroline Proust as Léa
- Samir Guesmi as Fred
- Cyril Couton as Mickey
- Eriq Ebouaney as Letallec
- Ciarán Hinds as Barnes
- Jocelyn Quivrin as Lebrun
- Hubert Saint-Macary as Leblanc
- Christian Hecq as Lardier
- Joe Sheridan as Finley
- Roger Dumas as Émile
- Mehdi Nebbou as Vincent
- Christian Erickson as Kruger
- Samir Boitard as Maxime's stooge
- Claudia Tagbo as Secretary #1
- Clovis Cornillac as Solal
