= Barbara Cabrita =

French-Portuguese actress

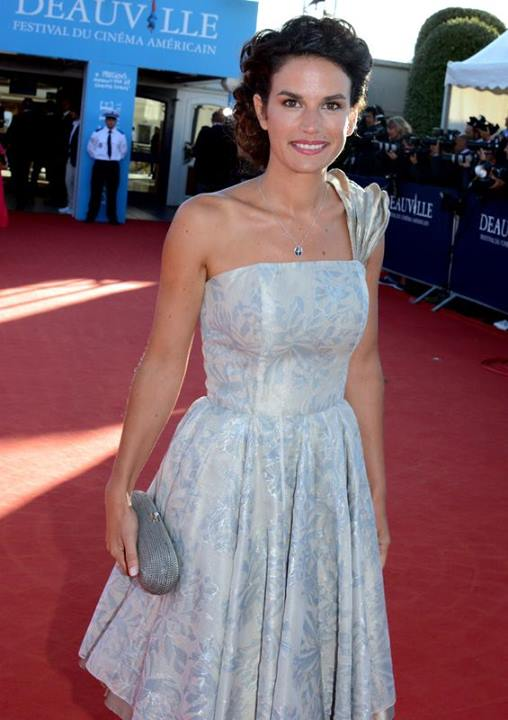
- Cabrita at the 2013 Deauville American Film Festival
- Born: 9 May 1982 (age 42); Trappes, Yvelines, France
- Occupation: Actress

Barbara Cabrita (born 9 May 1982) is a French-Portuguese actress, born in Trappes in the department of Yvelines.

== Early life ==
Cabrita was born to Portuguese immigrant parents. She began as a model at 16 years old. At 20 years old she plays in the sitcom Le Groupe and she became well known with the television series R.I.S, police scientifique, aired on first French TV channel, TF1.

== Filmography ==
=== Television ===
- Le Groupe (2001–2002)
- Central Nuit (2002)
- Sous le soleil (2002)
- Même âge, même adresse (2003–2004)
- R.I.S, police scientifique (2005–2011)
- Fortunes (2009–2010)
- Rivière-Perdue (2024)

=== Film ===
- Les Amateurs of Martin Valente (2003)
- Just Inès (2010)
- The Gilded Cage (2013)
- La Dream Team (2016)

=== Short film ===
- Quelqu'un de bien (2002)
- El Derechazo (2004)
- C ke du bonheur (2005)
- La Rivière (2005)

=== Commercials ===
- Go Clear (2002)
- Fanta (2003)
- Les Pages jaunes (2003)
- Nivéa (2003)
- Bouygues Telecom (2003)

=== TV movie ===
- L’Homme qui voulait passer à la télé (2005)
- Déjà vu (2007)
- Le Temps du silence (2011)

=== Music video ===
- Patrick Bruel – Mon amant de Saint Jean (2002)
- Patrick Bruel/Francis Cabrel – La Complainte de la butte (2002)
- Martin Rappeneau – Julien (2006)
- Tandem – La Trilogie (2006)
