= Jamel Comedy Club =

French TV comedy show

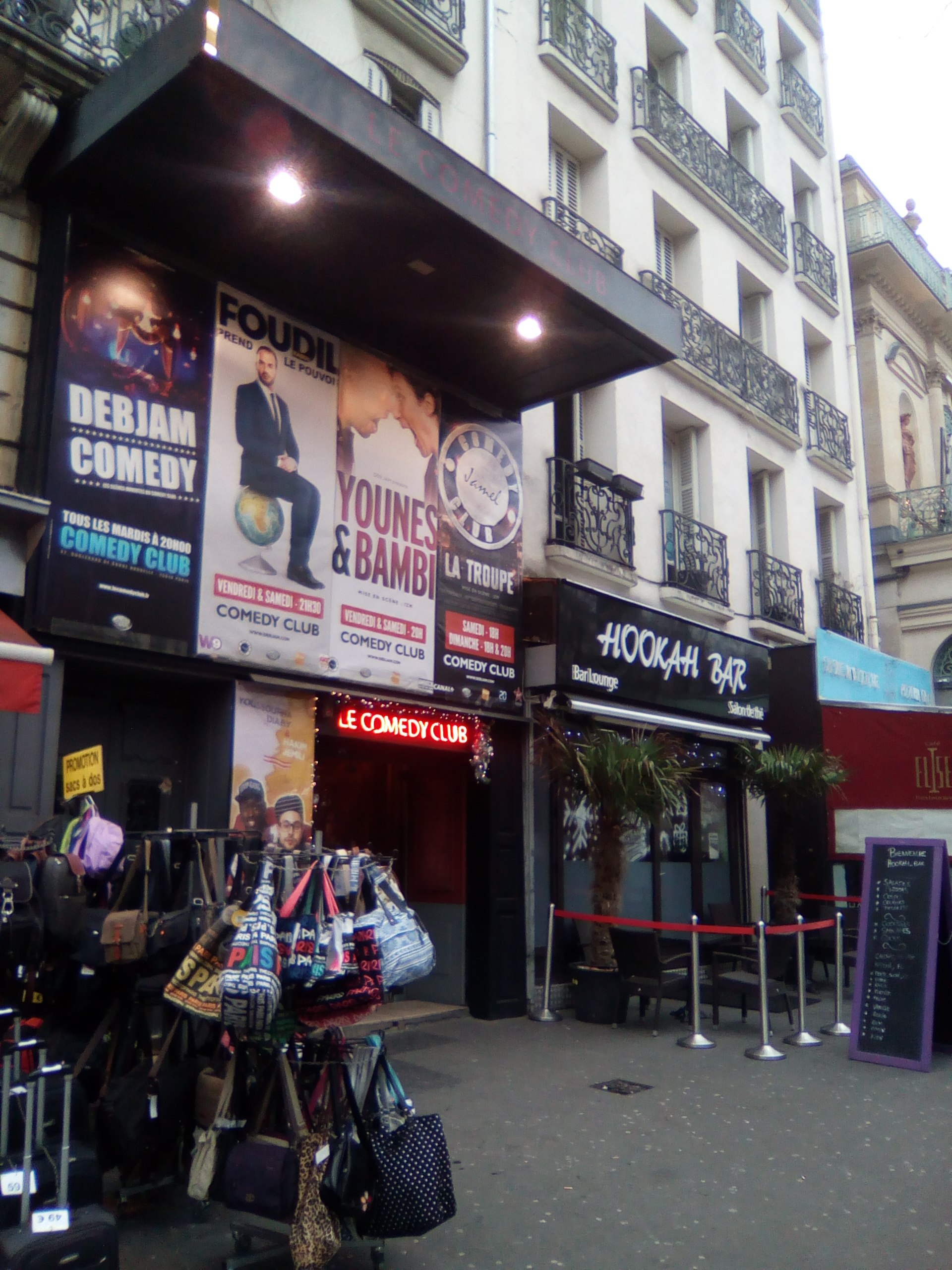
Le Comedy Club, in Paris

Jamel Comedy Club is a French comedy show on the television station Canal+, produced and presented by the French actor/comedian Jamel Debbouze.

It aims to highlight talented young comedians, who each get roughly 5 minutes in on stage with no props allowed.

The show has thus introduced several up-and-coming stand-up comedians, some of whom have had great success, such as, Amelle Chahbi, Blanche Gardin, Malik Bentalha, Haroun, Sebastian Marx, and Wahid Bouzidi.

It also aired on Moroccan TV channel 2M featuring Maghrebi and/or French comedians.

Coming off the show's success, Debbouze opened an American-style comedy club in Paris simply named "le Comedy Club" as it was possibly the first of its kind in France. Later renamed after the show, it gained a reputation as a starting ground for comedians who would later gain fame along with the show. Some performers who felt restrained by the limits placed on them by network guidelines and time limitations would go on to start their own solo acts. Most of these comedians are members of ethnic minorities in France, with their humor criticising majority stereotypes and expectations.
