= Samir Boitard =

French actor

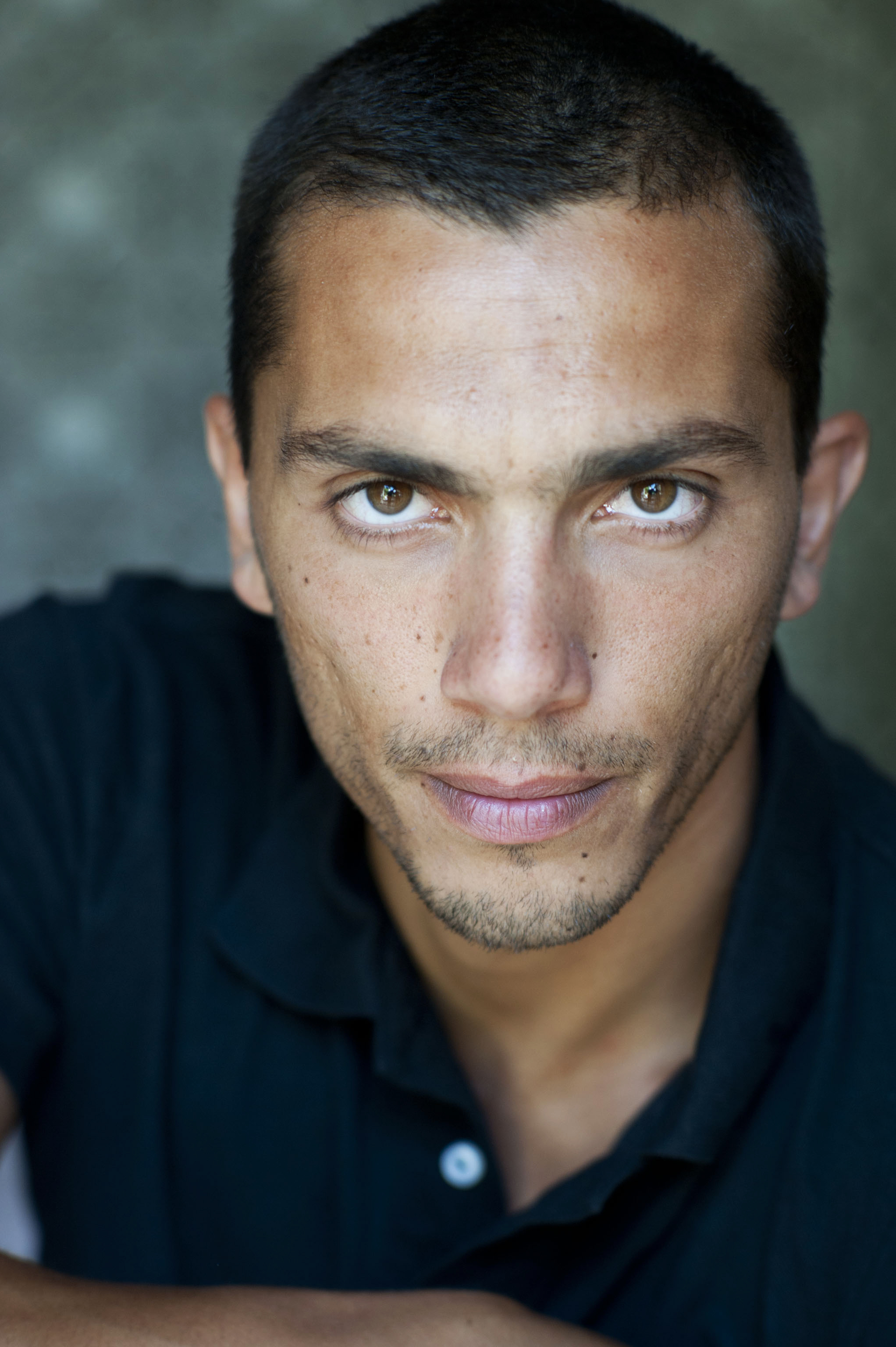
- Born: Marseille, France
- Citizenship: French
- Years active: 2003–present
- Website: samirboitard.com

Samir Boitard is a French actor.

== Personal life ==
He has been in a relationship with French actress Louise Monot since 2014. In October 2016 they announced on social media that they were expecting their first child.

== Filmography ==
Year	Title	Role	Director	Notes
2003	L'épicerie	The grocer	Marina de Van	Short
2006	Président	Nahéma's bodyguard	Lionel Delplanque	
2008	Ca$h	Maxime's friend	Éric Besnard	
2008	Le mal	The train guy	Benjamin Busnel	Short
2008	Une maman pour un coeur	Samir	Patrice Martineau	TV movie
2008-12	Spiral	Samy Aroune	Gilles Bannier, Virginie Sauveur, ...	TV series (10 episodes)
2009	Duel en ville	Nourredine Belkacem	Pascal Chaumeil	TV movie
2009	Le choix de Myriam	Miloud	Malik Chibane	TV movie
2009	R.I.S, police scientifique	Karim Akdar	François Guérin	TV series (1 episode)
2009	Enquêtes réservées	Cédric Orthez	Benoît d'Aubert	TV series (1 episode)
2009	Central nuit	Karim	Felix Olivier	TV series (1 episode)
2010	Les châtaigniers du désert	Mostafa Moumen	Caroline Huppert	TV mini-series
2010	Boulevard du Palais	Szekely	Thierry Petit	TV series (1 episode)
2012	Fatum	Samir	Sarah Marx	Short
2012	Chien de guerre	Walid	Fabrice Cazeneuve	TV movie
2012	Antigone 34	Kader	Louis-Pascal Couvelaire	TV series (1 episode)
2012	Trafics	Malik	Olivier Barma	TV series (1 episode)
2013	Fourberie	Don Juan	Nicolas Herman & Laurent Jumeaucourt	Short
2014	Twilight of Shadows	Khaled	Mohammed Lakhdar-Hamina	
2014	Où es-tu maintenant ?	Othmane	Arnaud Sélignac	TV movie
2014	Caïn	Wolf	Benoît d'Aubert (2)	TV series (1 episode)
2015	No Limit	Reda	Ludovic Colbeau-Justin	TV series (6 episodes)
2016	3 Mariages et un coup de foudre	Issam	Gilles de Maistre	TV movie
2016	Le secret d'Elise	Yanis Ramza	Alexandre Laurent	TV mini-series
2017	Les hommes de la nuit	Hicham	Abdeslam Kelai	
2017	Zone Blanche	Paul Méric		TV series

== See also ==
- Cinema of France
