= Brice Fournier =

French actor

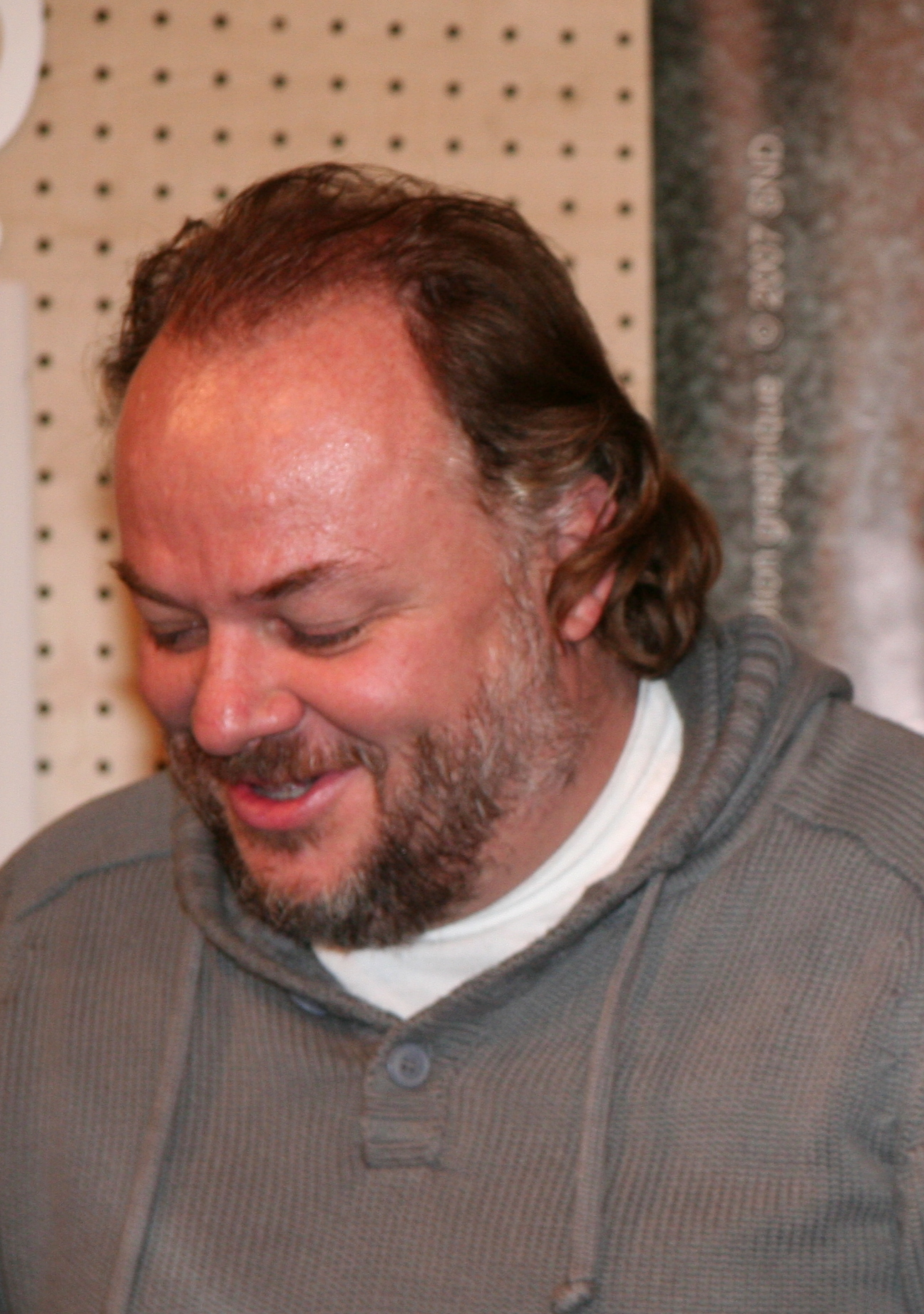
- Fournier in 2007
- Born: 20 July 1966 (age 59); Lyon, France
- Occupation: Actor
- Years active: 2004-present

Brice Fournier (born 20 July 1966) is a French actor. He appeared in more than thirty films since 2004.

Fournier grew up in Saint-Priest.

== Selected filmography ==
Film
Year	Title	Role	Notes
2021	OSS 117: Alerte Rouge en Afrique Noire		
2014	WorkinGirls	Duverneuil	TV series (1 episode)
2012	Haute Cuisine		
2010	The Pack		
2010	Point Blank		
2010	Thelma, Louise et Chantal		
2009	In the Beginning		

TV
Year	Title	Role	Notes
2005-2009	Kaamelott		
