= Vilaine (film) =

- Directed by: Jean-Patrick Benes; Allan Mauduit
- Written by: Jean-Patrick Benes; Allan Mauduit
- Produced by: Fabrice Goldstein; Antoine Rein; Antoine Gandaubert
- Starring: Marilou Berry; Chantal Lauby; Frédérique Bel; Joséphine de Meaux; Alice Pol; Pierre-François Martin-Laval
- Narrated by: Jean-Claude Dreyfus
- Cinematography: Régis Blondeau
- Edited by: Antoine Vareille
- Music by: Christophe Julien
- Production company: Karé Productions
- Distributed by: SND Films
- Release date: 12 November 2008 (France)
- Running time: 93 min
- Country: France
- Language: French
- Budget: $3 million
- Box office: $8.1 million

Vilaine (Naughty) is a 2008 French comedy film directed and written by Jean-Patrick Benes and Allan Mauduit.

== Plot ==
Melanie was the whipping girl in her class. Today, she has remained an unattractive woman, overwhelmed by her boss and her neighbor, a little too sweet and indulgent. Naive and generous, she falls into the trap of her beautiful and wicked cousin Aurore in believing in Prince Charming. Determined to get revenge, Melanie becomes "naughty" and exploits her boss, does dirty tricks to Aurore's friends, and gives "tips" advised everyone, calculated in advance, of course.

== Cast ==
- Marilou Berry as Mélanie Lupin
- Chantal Lauby as Mélanie's mother
- Frédérique Bel as Aurore Cahier
- Joséphine de Meaux as Blandine
- Alice Pol as Jessica
- Pierre-François Martin-Laval as Martinez
- Thomas N'Gijol as Innocent Drogba
- Gil Alma as Jonathan
- Charles Meurisse as Aymeric
- Isabelle Mazin as Madame Lepinsec
- Chantal Ravalec as Mademoiselle Stanpinski
- Marie Bach as Delphine
- Liliane Rovère as Mélanie's grandmother
- Léa Pelletant as Blandine's mother
- Claudia Tagbo as The Mom at the airport
- Juliette Galoisy as The journalist
- Eric Laugérias as Elephant cop
- Stéphane Blancafort as De Niro cop
- Eric Moncoucut as Nice cop
- Théo Ponce-Ludier as The flower kid
- Alexandre Trijoulet as The monk
