= Le Crocodile du Botswanga =

2014 film

- Film poster
- Directed by: Lionel Steketee; Fabrice Eboué
- Written by: Fabrice Eboué
- Produced by: Alain Goldman
- Starring: Fabrice Eboué; Thomas N'Gijol; Ibrahim Koma; Claudia Tagbo
- Cinematography: Stéphane Le Parc
- Edited by: Frédérique Olszak
- Music by: Guillaume Roussel
- Production company: Légende Films
- Distributed by: Mars Distribution
- Release date: 19 February 2014
- Running time: 90 minutes
- Country: France
- Language: French
- Budget: $9.7 million
- Box office: $10.4 million

Le Crocodile du Botswanga (Botswanga Crocodile) is a 2014 French comedy film directed by Lionel Steketee and Fabrice Eboué.

== Cast ==
- Thomas N'Gijol – Capitaine Bobo
- Fabrice Éboué – Didier
- Ibrahim Koma – Leslie Konda
- Claudia Tagbo – Maman Jacqueline
- Franck de la Personne – Monsieur Pierre
- Eriq Ebouaney – Lieutenant Yaya
- Étienne Chicot – Jacques Taucard
- Hélène Kuhn – Léa
- Issa Doumbia – Soldat Issa
- Amelle Chahbi – Karina
- Marc Ateba – Bobo Junior
- Pascal N'Zonzi – The Minister for firms
