= Blanche Gardin =

French actress, comedian and writer (born 1977)

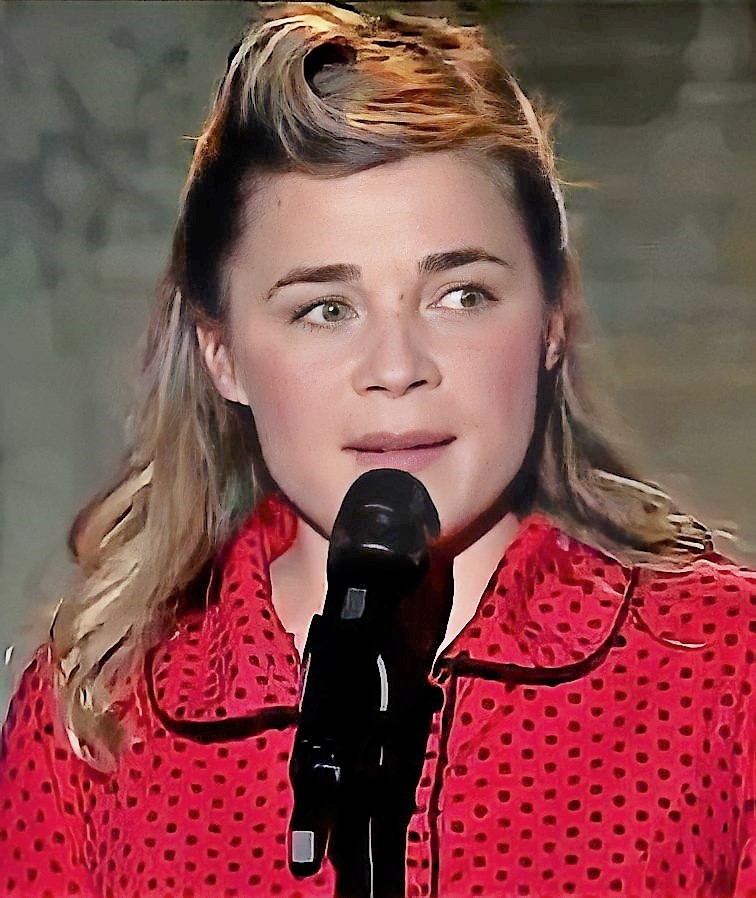
- Gardin in Montreux, 2018
- Born: 3 April 1977 (age 49); Suresnes, France
- Occupations: Actress; comedian; writer
- Years active: 2006–present

Blanche Gardin (French pronunciation: [blɑ̃ʃ ɡaʁdɛ̃]; born 3 April 1977) is a French comedian, actress and screenwriter. She became known to the general public through her participation in the Jamel Comedy Club and for her role in the television series WorkinGirls on Canal+, and then became popular with her stand-up shows. She won the Molière Award for Humor two years in a row for her shows Je parle toute seule and Bonne nuit Blanche in 2018 and 2019. As a screenwriter, she notably co-wrote the short program Parents mode d'emploi, broadcast on France 2.

== Early life and education ==
Gardin was born on 3 April 1977 in Suresnes to a linguistics professor father and a novelist and translator mother. Gardin holds a Master of Sociology degree from the Paris Nanterre University.

== Personal life ==
Gardin dated American comedian Louis C.K. from 2018 to 2022.

== One-woman shows ==
Blanche Gardin one-woman shows
| Year | Title | Author | Director | Notes |
|---|---|---|---|---|
| 2014–15 | Il faut que je vous parle ! | Blanche Gardin | Alain Degois | |
| 2016–17 | Je parle toute seule | Blanche Gardin | Maïa Sandoz | Molière Award for Best One Man Show |
| 2018–19 | Bonne nuit Blanche | Blanche Gardin | Maïa Sandoz | Molière Award for Best One Man Show |

== Filmography ==
| Year | Title | Role | Director | Notes |
|---|---|---|---|---|
| 2008 | Rien dans les poches | Lisa | Marion Vernoux | TV movie |
| 2009 | Les livres qui tuent | Madeleine Maury | Denys Granier-Deferre | TV movie |
| 2010 | Happy Few | Rachel's sister | Antony Cordier | |
| 2010 | L'homme sans nom | Margot Rizzi | Sylvain Monod | TV movie |
| 2011 | Low Cost | Gaétane | Maurice Barthélemy | |
| 2011 | La lisière | Clothilde | Géraldine Bajard | |
| 2011 | Case départ | Corinne | Lionel Steketee, Fabrice Eboué & Thomas N'Gijol | |
| 2011 | Declaration of War | Hostess Necker | Valérie Donzelli | |
| 2011 | La part des anges | Gendarme Lebrun | Sylvain Monod | TV movie |
| 2011 | Bref | Katie | Kyan Khojandi | TV series (2 episodes) |
| 2012–14 | WorkinGirls | Hélène Grilloux | Sylvain Fusée | TV series (36 episodes) |
| 2013 | It Boy | The photographer | David Moreau | |
| 2013 | Des frères et des soeurs | Alice | Anne Giafferi | TV movie |
| 2014 | WorkinGirls: La grande évasion | Hélène Grilloux | Sylvain Fusée | TV movie |
| 2015 | Memories | The office clerk | Jean-Paul Rouve | |
| 2016 | Tamara | Valérie | Alexandre Castagnetti | |
| 2016 | La Dream Team | Coco | Thomas Sorriaux | |
| 2016 | Roommates Wanted | Rose | François Desagnat | |
| 2016 | Damoclès | Lucie | Manuel Schapira | TV movie |
| 2017 | Problemos | Gaya | Éric Judor | Also writer |
| 2018 | Tamara Vol. 2 | Valérie | Alexandre Castagnetti | |
| 2018 | I Am Not an Easy Man | Sybille | Eleonore Pourriat | |
| 2018 | Sur un AirBnb | Louise | Zazon | Short |
| 2020 | Selfie | Stéphanie Perez | Thomas Bidegain | |
| 2020 | Iamhere | Suzanne | Éric Lartigau | |
| 2020 | Delete History | Marie Dehoux | Benoît Delépine & Gustave Kervern | |
| 2021 | France | Lou | Bruno Dumont | |
| 2021 | Bloody Oranges | The gynecologist | Jean-Christophe Meurisse | |
| 2021 | La meilleure version de moi-même | Blanche | Blanche Gardin | TV series (9 episodes); Nominated - ACS Award for Best TV Series : 26 minutes Nominated - ACS Award for Best Actress |
| 2022 | Everybody Loves Jeanne | Jeanne Mayer | Céline Devaux | |
| 2022 | Smoking Causes Coughing | Auntie Tony | Quentin Dupieux | |
| 2023 | The Book of Solutions | Charlotte | Michel Gondry | |
| 2023 | Yannick | Sophie Denis | Quentin Dupieux | |
| 2024 | Being Blanche Houellebecq | Blanche Gardin | Guillaume Nicloux | |
| 2025 | The Incredible Snow Woman | Coline | Sébastien Betbeder | It will be screened in Panorama at the 75th Berlin International Film Festival in February 2025. |

=== Television ===
| Year | Title | Role | Notes |
|---|---|---|---|
| 2006–09 | Inside Jamel Comedy Club | Comedian | TV show |
| 2007–08 | Ligne Blanche | Host | TV show |

== Author ==
Blanche Gardin books
| Year | Book | Publishing |
|---|---|---|
| 2016 | Il faut que je vous parle ! | Editions First |
