= Twilight of Shadows =

2014 film

- Film poster
- Directed by: Mohammed Lakhdar-Hamina
- Written by: Mohammed Lakhdar-Hamina
- Produced by: Mohammed Lakhdar-Hamina, Tarek Lakhdar-Hamina
- Starring: Samir Boitard
- Cinematography: Alessandro Pesci
- Edited by: Hervé de Luze, Marie-Pierre Renaud
- Music by: Vangelis
- Release date: 24 August 2014 (France)
- Running time: 114 minutes
- Country: Algeria
- Language: Arabic

Twilight of Shadows (Arabic: غروب الظلال, Ghouroub Edhilal, French: Crépuscule des ombres) is a 2014 Algerian drama film directed by Mohammed Lakhdar-Hamina. The film was selected as the Algerian entry for the Best Foreign Language Film at the 88th Academy Awards but it was not nominated.

== Plot ==
The film is set against the backdrop of the Algerian War. A determined French commander, who believes Algeria belongs to France, must deal with a soldier who rebels when asked to execute an Algerian freedom fighter. The finale is set in the blistering desert as the soldier seeks to escape.

== Cast ==
- Samir Boitard - Khaled
- Nicolas Bridet - Lambert
- Laurent Hennequin - Commandant Saintenac
- Bernard Montiel - The Teacher
- Mehdi Tahmi
- Merouane Mansouri

== See also ==
- List of submissions to the 88th Academy Awards for Best Foreign Language Film
- List of Algerian submissions for the Academy Award for Best Foreign Language Film
