= The Gilded Cage (2013 film) =

- French release poster
- Directed by: Ruben Alves
- Written by: Ruben Alves; Hugo Gélin; Jean-André Yerles
- Produced by: Danièle Delorme; Laetitia Galitzine; Hugo Gélin
- Starring: Rita Blanco; Joaquim de Almeida; Roland Giraud; Chantal Lauby
- Cinematography: André Szankowski
- Edited by: Nassim Gordji Tehrani
- Music by: Rémi Barbot; Raphael Hamburger; Rodrigo Leão
- Production company: Zazi Films
- Distributed by: Pathé
- Release date: 24 April 2013
- Running time: 90 minutes
- Countries: France; Belgium; Portugal
- Languages: French; Portuguese
- Budget: million
- Box office: million

The Gilded Cage (French: La Cage Dorée; Portuguese: A Gaiola Dourada) is a Franco-Portuguese comedy film released in 2013. The film was Ruben Alves' directorial debut and it was inspired by his parents' life.

The film was released April 24 in France and was released on August 1 in Portugal, after a successful preview showing at the Azores Festival.

It won the People's Choice Award at the 26th European Film Awards. It was the film with the most admissions at the Portuguese box office in 2013, with 755 000 and it is the 7th film with most admissions and the 3rd highest-grossing in Portugal since 2004.

The film won the Radio-Canada Audience Award at the 2014 edition of the Cinéfranco film festival.

== Cast ==
- Rita Blanco as Maria Ribeiro
- Joaquim de Almeida as José Ribeiro
- Roland Giraud as Francis Cailaux
- Chantal Lauby as Solange Cailaux
- Barbara Cabrita as Paula Ribeiro
- Lannick Gautry as Charles Cailaux
- Maria Vieira as Rosa
- Jacqueline Corado as Lourdes
- Jean-Pierre Martins as Carlos
- Alex Alves Pereira as Pedro Ribeiro
- Catarina Wallenstein as Fadosinger
- Alice Isaaz as Cassiopée
