= R.I.S, police scientifique =

French television series

- Genre: Crime drama
- Created by: Stéphane Kaminka
- Starring: Jean-Pierre Michaël; Pierre-Loup Rajot; Stéphane Metzger; Aurélie Bargème; Barbara Cabrita; Philippe Caroit; Jean Baptiste Marcenac; Laurent Olmedo; Claudia Tagbo; Jean Luc Joseph; Anne Charlotte Pontabry; Coraly Zahonero; Michael Voita; Laetitia Fourcade; Delfine Rollin
- Country of origin: France
- Original language: French
- No. of seasons: 8
- No. of episodes: 100 (list of episodes)

Production
- Production locations: Paris, France
- Running time: 52 minutes

Original release
- Network: TF1
- Release: January 12, 2006 – February 20, 2014

R.I.S, police scientifique is a French television series, created by Stéphane Kaminka in 2005, broadcast by TF1 since 2006. The R.I.S. in the title is an acronym for Recherches et Investigations Scientifiques, referring to the fictional police investigation unit that is the focus of the series. The series, a crime drama, is a remake of an Italian television series entitled RIS Delitti Imperfetti.

== Plot summary ==
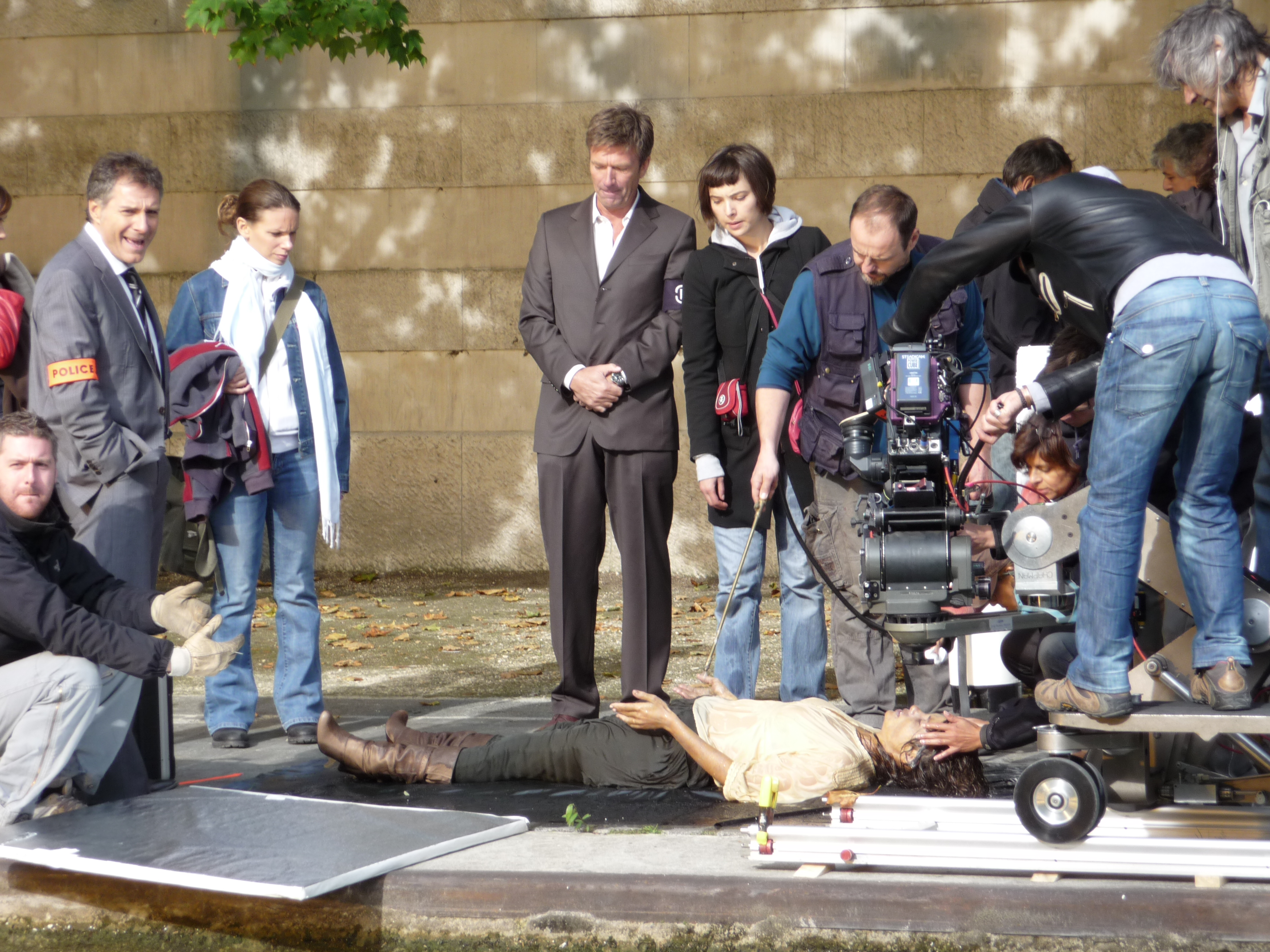
Filming an episode in 2008

The series follows team of crime lab experts who trying to solve crime. The Experts work with two detectives (from season 6 just one) and helps them to arrest suspects and gave them the evidence they need. There are five (in season 4 six and in season 5 seven) crime lab technicians. These experts are head of R.I.S Marc Venturi (seasons 1–2), Gilles Sagnac (seasons 3–6), Maxime Vernon (seasons 6-7) and Lucie Ballack (season 8). Under their command are technicians Hugo Chalonges (seasons 1–6), Malin Berkaoui, Nathalie Giesbert (seasons 1–5), Julie Labro (seasons 1–6), Frédéric Arthaud (seasons 4–8), Katia Schriver (seasons 5–7) and Émilie Durringer (seasons 6–8). Crime lab cooperate with medical expert dr. Alessandra Joffrin and with two detectives, captain Pierre Morand and lieutenant Martine Forest (seasons 1–5). Location of the series is in Paris, France.

== Characters ==
- Jean-Pierre Michaël as Marc Venturi (2005–07, 09): Head of the R.I.S
- Philippe Caroit as Gilles Sagnac (2007–10): Head of the R.I.S
- Michel Voïta as Maxime Vernon (2011–12): Head of the R.I.S
- Delfinne Rollin as Lucie Ballak (2013–14): Head of the R.I.S
- Pierre-Loup Rajot as Hugo Chalonges (2005–10)
- Stéphane Metzger as Malik Berkaoui (2005–14)
- Jean Luc Joseph as Frédéric Arthaud (2008–14)
- Aurélie Bargème as Nathalie Giesbert (2005–09)
- Anne Charlotte Pontabry as Katia Schriver (2009–12)
- Barbara Cabrita as Julie Labro (2005–11)
- Laetitia Fourcade as Émilie Durringer (2011–14)
- Coraly Zahonero as Docteur Alessandra Joffrin (2005–14)
- Laurent Olmedo as Captain Pierre Morand (2005–14)
- Claudia Tagbo as Lieutenant Martine Forest (2005–09)

Character	Actor	Seasons								
Character	Actor	1	2	3	4	5	6	7	8	9
Marc Venturi	Jean-Pierre Michaël	Main	Main			Guest	Archive footage			
Hugo Chalonges	Pierre-Loup Rajot	Main	Main	Main	Main	Main	Main			
Malik Barkaoui	Stéphane Metzger	Main	Main	Main	Main	Main	Main	Main	Main	Main
Nathalie Giesbert	Aurélie Bargème	Main	Main	Main	Main	Recurring				
Julie Labro	Barbara Cabrita	Main	Main	Main	Main	Main	Main	Main		Archive footage
Gilles Sagnac	Philippe Caroit			Main	Main	Main	Main			
dr. Alessandra Joffrin	Coraly Zahonero	Recurring	Recurring	Recurring	Main	Main	Main	Main	Main	Main
Captain Pierre Maurand	Laurent Olmedo	Recurring	Recurring	Recurring	Main	Main	Main	Main	Main	Main
Lieutenant Martine Forest	Claudia Tagbo	Recurring	Recurring	Recurring	Main	Recurring				
Katia Schriver	Anne Charlotte Pontabry					Main	Main	Main	Main	
Commander Maxime Vernon	Michel Voïta						Main	Main	Main	Archive footage
Frédéric Arthaud	Jean Luc Joseph				Recurring	Recurring	Main	Main	Main	Main
Émilie Durringer	Laetitia Fourcade							Main	Main	Main
Commandant Lucie Ballack	Delfine Rollin									Main

=== Main ===
- Marc Venturi

Mark was the head of the R.I.S for first two seasons of the show. He was brief in relationship with Julie. He has a wife, who was kidnapped. And all the time he was boss he never stop looking for her. At the end of second season he resigned R.I.S and told Hugo that he found his wife and he is going to meet her. He returned once in season five to help the team to find a bomber. At the time he became a special adviser in the bomb-squad.

- Hugo Chalonges

Hugo is expert in physics and chemistry. He is close friend to both Marc Venturi and Gilles Sagnac. He has a daughter Cécile, who is invalid. In season 6 Hugo faked his death with help of Gillas and Alessandra that he can investigate a fabric business where some women who worked there had a miscarriage, because they inhaled some gasses. Later team found out that he faked his death. They were shocked, especially Fred. At the end of the episode when Gilles was fired for his actions Hugo quit.

- Malik Berkaoui

Malik is expert in ballistic. He was in romantic relationship with Julie and before her with Cécile, Hugo's daughter. In season 7 he was captured by Julie's killer and had a bomb on his chest. The team succeeded in freeing him. In season 9 he was in romantic relationship with a woman named Coralie "Lilou" Dumas. Later Lilou was murdered and killer framed him. Malik later escapes from police custody and go on revenge. He went on a roof across the flat of a killer and he wanted to kill him, but he changed his mind because he is not killer. At the end of the final season he left R.I.S to go on treatment, but he told Ballack that he will be back.

- Nathalie Giesbert

Nathalie is expert in biology. She was on the show from season 1 to 5. At the beginning of season 5 she take Eloise on her first field assignment and left her in apartment to investigate. In apartment was gas leaking and later the flat exploded. Nathalie quit in episode 3 with feelings that she is responsible for Eloise's death.

- Julie Labro

Julie is expert in electronic. She was in brief romantic relationship with Marc and in romantic relationship with Mailc. She was almost killed in season one while working on a device found on crime scene. The device exploded, but she make it. In season seven she was target of killer who blame her and Malik because they weren't properly investigate death of his wife and thought that are suicide. At the end of episode 1 the bomb exploded in Julie's apartment and Malik was trying to call her. In episode 2 Malik entered in her apartment and found her. She was driven to a hospital where she died.

- Dr. Alessandra Joffrin

Alessandra is a medical examiner who works with team and provides them autopsies and CODs and TODs. In season 4 she was captured in refrigerator truck by a killer. The team found her when she was near the death. She took leave of absence of 4 episodes to recover herself. She return to the job in episode 6 of season 4. In season 8 she was in romantic relationship with Maurand and in season 9 they have a baby.

- Pierre Maurand

Pierre is a police detective with the rank of captain. He was close friend to Marc and Gilles. In season 8 it is revealed that he is in romantic relationship with Alessandra. In season 9 they have a baby.

- Martine Forest

Martine is a police detective with the rank of lieutenant. She also worked with team when they had a two crime scenes. She worked with one part and Maurand with the other part of the team. In season 5 she was wounded and she left to recovery herself. Claudia Tagbo was the only cast member to be promoted to the main cast and then demoted to recurring cast again. Martine is the only black women who worked in R.I.S

- Gilles Sagnac

Gilles succeeded Marc Venturi on a position of the head of the R.I.S. Gilles was close friend to Hugo and Pierre. In season 6 he, Hugo and Alessandra faked Hugo's death to provide him investigation. At the end of episode 6 Gilles was fired from R.I.S.

- Frédéric "Fred" Arthaud

Fred was lab technician and he was introduced at the beginning of season 4. He is closed friend to Mailk and Hugo. Fred is only black man who work in R.I.S. In season 9 he was almost killed with Gorgona virus, but he survived. In the same season he saved his girlfriend from the hands of rapist and killer who try to rape and kill her.

- Dr. Gabriel Valmer

Dr. Valmer was medical examiner like Alessandra. He replaced her in four episodes of her absence when she recovering herself. When she returned he stayed on a position of ME and helped the team as the other ME. He was written out near the end of season 5 with no explanation for his departing.

- Katia Schriver

Katia first appeared at the beginning of season 5 to help the team on a case they worked. When Nathalie left she joined the R.I.S team. She was written out at the end of season 8 with no explanation to her departing.

- Maxime Vernon

Vernon is succeeded Sagnac on the position of the head of R.I.S in 7th episode of season 6. Vernon has the rank of commander. At the end of season 8 he is shot by a suspect who escape from the custody and took Émilie as a hostage. At the beginning of season 9 it is revealed that he did not survive and that he died from injures.

- Émilie Durringer

Émilie replaced Julie in 3rd episode of season 7. She first help the R.I.S team on a case of murder and later joined the R.I.S team. In season 9 premiere she was taken as a hostage by suspect and buried in stone grave. In 2nd episode she is freed by the team. At first seemed that she died, but seconds later she opened her eyes. Later in season 9 she was almost killed by Gorgona virus like Fred, but she survived.

- Lucie Ballack

Ballack succeeded Vernon on the position of the head of the R.I.S and she is the only women who was boss. She was frustrated when Émilie was kidnapped on her first day on the job, but with Alessandra's help she calmed down.

=== Recurring ===
- Cécile Challonges (seasons 1–2,5-6)

Cécile (portrayed by Lizzie Brocheré) is Hugo's daughter. She is invalid. She was in brief romantic relationship with Malik. At the end of season 2 she left the country and went on operation. She returned in season 5 and it is revealed that operation succeeded and that she can walk now. She made her last appearance in season 6.

- Eloise Soma (seasons 4-5)

Eloise (portrayed by Claire Galopin) is a lab technician like Fred. Her first field assignment was in season 5 premiere. She was alone in apartment on crime scene where gas was leaking. She collapsed, but the team did not notice that she is missing until couple hours later. Hugo, Malik and Nathalie returned to the crime scene but the apartment was on fire. Malik run in the building seconds before apartment exploded. She died before apartment exploded from the gas. Nathalie quit because Eloise's death.

=== Guest ===
- Adriana Karembeu as Krystel Regnier
- Eriq Ebouaney as The Campus President
- Fanny Sidney as Mathilde
- Françoise Bertin as Annette Dumas / Lucette
- Hugo Becker as Emmanuel
- Jean Dell as Lawyer Langevin
- Jean-Marie Bigard as Carrera
- Jonas Bloquet as Alexandre Bouvier
- Lannick Gautry as Stéphane
- Liane Foly as Monica Verone
- Linda Hardy as Lilou
- Marie-Christine Adam as Madame Duringer
- Marie-Hélène Lentini as Committee Member
- Patrick Descamps as Henri Marcon
- Samir Boitard as Karim Akdar
- Serge Riaboukine as Me Kalfan

== Episodes ==
Series	Episodes	Originally released	
Series	Episodes	First released	Last released
1	8	12 January 2006	2 February 2006
2	12	11 January 2007	29 March 2007
3	10	24 January 2008	21 February 2008
4	16	4 September 2008	16 April 2009
5	16	15 October 2009	29 April 2010
6	10	9 December 2010	26 May 2011
7	8	16 February 2012	8 March 2012
8	12	10 January 2013	21 February 2013
9	8	30 January 2014	20 February 2014

== Differences from the original version ==
The series is rather similar to the original Italian version. Most of the episodes are remakes of episodes from the Italian version, with the settings of the episodes relocated to France and characters given French names, though the second season featured a few episodes with original plot lines.

The head of the French RIS, Marc Venturi, shares the last name with the head of the Italian RIS, Riccardo Venturi, but aside from that, none of the other names are the same.

== See also ==
- RIS Delitti Imperfetti, the original Italian version
- R. I. S. – Die Sprache der Toten, the German remake of RIS Delitti Imperfetti
- List of French Adaptations of Television Series from Other Countries
- C.S.I.: Crime Scene Investigation
