= Those Happy Days (2006 film) =

- Film poster
- French: Nos jours heureux
- Directed by: Éric Toledano; Olivier Nakache
- Written by: Éric Toledano; Olivier Nakache
- Starring: Marilou Berry; Jean-Paul Rouve; Omar Sy; Lannick Gautry; Joséphine de Meaux
- Cinematography: Rémy Chevrin
- Edited by: Dorian Rigal-Ansous
- Music by: Frédéric Talgorn
- Production company: Quad Productions
- Distributed by: SND Films
- Release date: 28 June 2006
- Running time: 103 minutes
- Country: France
- Language: French
- Budget: $6.9 million
- Box office: $10.9 million

Those Happy Days (French: Nos jours heureux) is a 2006 French comedy film, directed and written by Éric Toledano and Olivier Nakache and starring Marilou Berry, Jean-Paul Rouve and Omar Sy.

== Synopsis ==
In the summer of 1992, for the first time Vincent Rousseau runs a summer camp; but, quickly runs into many difficulties that he has to deal with.

== Cast ==
- Jean-Paul Rouve as Vincent
- Marilou Berry as Nadine
- Omar Sy as Joseph
- Lannick Gautry as Daniel
- Joséphine de Meaux as Caroline
- Jacques Boudet as Albert
- Jean Benguigui as Mimoun
- Catherine Hosmalin as Christine
- Julie Fournier as Lisa
- Guillaume Cyr as Truman
- Arthur Mazet as Guillaume
- Jérémy Denisty as Timoty
- Arthur de Donno as Steve
- Yannis Belal as Youssef
- Johanna Ansart as Léa
- Cindy Colpaert as Camille
- Martin Jobert as Benoît
- Ilona Bachelier as Charlotte
- Joël Pyrene as Achille
- Lise Lamétrie as Monique Vannier
- Jean-Yves Roan as Gilbert Michaud
- Idit Cebula as Madame Marciano
- Farida Ouchani as Madame Gedaui
- Josette Ménard as Madame Joyadet
- Michel Winogradoff as Monsieur Joyadet
- Jean-Michel Lahmi as Monsieur Pichavent
- Lionel Abelanski as Train's driver
- Olivier Nakache as The doctor
- Éric Toledano as The pizzaïolo
