= Coexister =

- Directed by: Fabrice Eboué
- Written by: Fabrice Eboué
- Produced by: Edouard de Vésinne
- Starring: Ramzy Bedia; Guillaume de Tonquédec; Jonathan Cohen; Fabrice Eboué; Audrey Lamy; Mathilde Seigner
- Cinematography: Philippe Guilbert
- Edited by: Alice Plantin
- Music by: Guillaume Roussel
- Production companies: EuropaCorp; France 2 Cinéma; Chez Félix; Solidaris
- Distributed by: EuropaCorp. Distribution
- Release date: 11 October 2017
- Running time: 90 minutes
- Country: France
- Language: French
- Budget: $10.5 million
- Box office: $5.3 million

Coexister is a 2017 French comedy film directed and written by Fabrice Eboué.

== Plot ==
Music producer Nicolas Lejeune is in desperate need for new stars because business is bad. His boss Sophie Demanche gives him a last chance and a deadline. Unless he discovers within six months musicians who are able to sell out the famous Olympia concert hall he will be fired. Right after he has accepted this challenge he vents off at a fancy dress party. The next morning he checks the pictures which were taken with his smartphone during the night. Looking at partygoers dressed as priests inspires him. He decides to create a trio consisting of a Catholic priest, a rabbi and an imam. His assistant Sabrina soon finds a willing Catholic priest but they cannot find a real rabbi or a real imam. So they hire a mentally unstable former rabbi and a scoundrel who pretends to be an imam. This leads inevitably to a variety of issues.

== Cast ==
- Ramzy Bedia: Imam Moncef
- Guillaume de Tonquédec: Père Benoît
- Jonathan Cohen: Rabbin Samuel
- Fabrice Eboué: Nicolas
- Audrey Lamy: Sabrina
- Mathilde Seigner: Sophie Demanche
- Amelle Chahbi: Alexia
- Michel Drucker: Himself
- Elisabeth Duda : Presentatrice de radio catholique
