= L'Élève Ducobu (film) =

- Theatrical release poster
- Directed by: Philippe de Chauveron
- Starring: Élie Semoun; Joséphine de Meaux; Vincent Claude; Juliette Chappey
- Release date: June 22, 2011
- Country: France
- Language: French
- Budget: $10.5 million
- Box office: $14.3 million

L'Élève Ducobu is a 2011 French children's comedy film directed by Philippe de Chauveron. It is based on the eponymous comic series by Godi and Zidrou. The film features Élie Semoun, Joséphine de Meaux, Vincent Claude and Juliette Chappey. It was released on 22 June 2011.

== Plot ==
Ducobu (Vincent Claude) is a lazy student who is fond of cheating. After being dismissed from one school, he is sent to Saint-Potache Primary School; if he does not perform well there, his parents will send him to boarding school. Ducobu concocts innovative methods of cheating in order to get by, much to the frustration of his teacher, Mr Latouche (Élie Semoun), who tries to catch Ducobu. Ducobu regularly attempts to copy the work of Léonie (Juliette Chappey), the top student in the class. Nevertheless, Ducobu and Léonie eventually become friends.

== Cast ==
- Élie Semoun as Mr Latouche
- Joséphine de Meaux as Ms Rateau, the music teacher
- Vincent Claude as Ducobu
- Juliette Chappey as Léonie
- Bruno Podalydès as Hervé Ducobu, Ducobu's father
- Helena Noguerra as Adeline Gratin
- Lise Lamétrie as Mademoiselle Moute
- François Levantal as Pension Professor

== See also ==
- List of French films of 2011
