= Samba (2014 film) =

2014 film by Éric Toledano and Olivier Nakache

- Theatrical release poster
- Directed by: Éric Toledano; Olivier Nakache
- Screenplay by: Éric Toledano; Olivier Nakache
- Based on: Samba pour la France by Delphine Coulin
- Produced by: Nicolas Duval-Adassovsky; Yann Zenou; Laurent Zeitoun
- Starring: Omar Sy; Charlotte Gainsbourg; Tahar Rahim; Izïa Higelin; Isaka Sawadogo; Hélène Vincent; Liya Kebede; Youngar Fall
- Cinematography: Stéphane Fontaine
- Edited by: Dorian Rigal-Ansous
- Music by: Ludovico Einaudi
- Production companies: Quad Films; Ten Films; Gaumont; TF1 Films Production; Korokoro
- Distributed by: Gaumont
- Release dates: 7 September 2014 (TIFF); 15 October 2014 (France)
- Running time: 119 minutes
- Country: France
- Languages: French; Arabic; English; Portuguese; Russian; Serbian
- Budget: €15.4 million ($16.8 million)
- Box office: $39.2 million

Samba is a 2014 French comedy-drama film co-written and directed by Éric Toledano and Olivier Nakache.

The film premiered at the Toronto International Film Festival on 7 September 2014. It was released theatrically in France on 15 October 2014, and received a limited theatrical release in the United States on 24 July 2015.

== Premise ==
Samba Cissé, a migrant from Senegal to France, works as a dish washer in a hotel. After a bureaucratic slip-up lands him in detention, he is ordered to leave France. With the help of a businesswoman, he fights to stay in France.

== Cast ==
- Omar Sy as Samba Cissé
- Charlotte Gainsbourg as Alice
- Tahar Rahim as Wilson
- Izïa Higelin as Manu
- Hélène Vincent as Marcelle
- Liya Kebede as Magali
- Clotilde Mollet as Josiane
- Isaka Sawadogo as Jonas
- Jacqueline Jehanneuf as Maggy
- Youngar Fall as Lamouna
- Christiane Millet as Madeleine
- Sabine Pakora as Gracieuse
- Olivier Nakache as the poney club host
- Éric Toledano as the bartender

== Reception ==
On the review aggregator website Rotten Tomatoes, the film holds an approval rating of 61% based on 67 reviews, with an average score of 5.9/10. The website's critics consensus reads, "Samba isn't the finest effort from directors Olivier Nakache and Eric Toledano, but the film's shortcomings are partly balanced by its big heart and talented cast." On Metacritic, which assigns a normalised rating out of 100 based on reviews from mainstream critics, the film has a score of 53, based on 22 reviews, indicating "mixed or average" reviews. Audiences surveyed by CinemaScore gave the film an average grade of "B–" on an A+ to F scale.

Peter Debruge of Variety called the film "A highly polished, widely appealing big-budget French movie." He praised Sy's performance, writing, "If nothing else, the pic cements Sy's position as one of France's most magnetic screen personalities, even more compelling to watch in serious scenes than in the obligatory comedic bits."

However, Jordan Mintzer of The Hollywood Reporter criticized the film's plot: "The film's message is lost amid too many plot contrivances." He concluded that it is "another crowdpleasing social dramedy from the makers of Intouchables, though one that wears out its welcome without bringing its message home." Mark Adams from Screen Daily in his review said that it is a "well-meaning and occasionally joyous film that is ultimately too scattershot in its format and tone to really work".
