= Sebastian Marx =

American stand-up comedian based in France

- Born: 6 July 1979 (age 47); New York City, U.S.
- Education: Boston University

Comedy career
- Medium: Stand-up comedy, radio, television, books
- Website: www.sebmarx.com

Sebastian Marx is an American stand-up comedian, columnist and author based in Paris, who performs in both French and English.

== Early life and education ==
Marx was born in New York City. He made his first stage appearance at the age of 17 at Caroline's Comedy Club in New York, and went on to perform in clubs in New York and Boston, including with the sketch group Les Incontinentals. He studied film at Boston University.

== Career ==
Marx moved to France and began performing stand-up in French. He hosted New York Comedy Night, described as the first English-language comedy showcase in Paris. A 2010 Paris Update review of his one-man show A New Yorker in Paris praised its observations on life and language in France and its self-deprecating humour.

He joined the fifth season of Jamel Comedy Club in 2012 and gave his first radio column on France Inter in November 2013 in the programme On va tous y passer. In 2015 he became a television columnist on Le Grand 8 on D8, and in 2016 he created the web series La Langue française expliquée par un Américain, produced by Topito.

His stage shows include Un New-Yorkais à Paris (from 2014, La Nouvelle Seine), The French Dream (2017, Apollo Théâtre) and On est bien là, co-written with Bruno Muschio and directed by Lou Dussourd. On est bien là played at venues including the Théâtre des Mathurins and La Cigale. He later took the show to London. A new show is announced for La Scala in 2027.

== Works ==
- Les Trépidantes Mésaventures d'un Américain en France (First Éditions, 2017)
