= Everybody Loves Jeanne =

2022 French/Portuguese film

- Directed by: Céline Devaux
- Written by: Céline Devaux
- Starring: Blanche Gardin; Laurent Lafitte
- Release date: 21 May 2022 (CFF)
- Running time: 1h 35min
- Countries: France; Portugal
- Languages: French; Portuguese

Everybody Loves Jeanne (French: Tout le monde aime Jeanne) is a 2022 French/Portuguese comedy-drama film directed by Céline Devaux.

== Cast ==
- Blanche Gardin as Jeanne
- Laurent Lafitte as Jean
- Maxence Tual as Simon
- Nuno Lopes as Vitor
- Marthe Keller as Claudia
