= Shoe at Your Foot =

- Film poster
- French: Jusqu'à toi
- Directed by: Jennifer Devoldère
- Starring: Mélanie Laurent; Justin Bartha
- Release date: 29 July 2009
- Running time: 1h 20min
- Countries: Canada; France
- Language: French
- Budget: $4.2 million
- Box office: $1.3 million

Shoe at Your Foot (French: Jusqu'à toi, (lit. 'Up to you') is a 2009 Franco-Canadian romantic comedy film directed by Jennifer Devoldère.

== Cast ==
- Mélanie Laurent as Chloe
- Justin Bartha as Jack
- Valérie Benguigui as Myriam
- Billy Boyd as Rufus
- Maurice Bénichou as Receptionist
- Géraldine Nakache as Josée
- Yvon Back as Didier
- Dorothée Berryman as Jack's mother
- Jessica Paré as Liza
- Jackie Berroyer as Chloé's father
- Éric Berger as Jérome
- Arié Elmaleh as Pedro
- Joséphine de Meaux as The hostess
