= Amelle Chahbi =

French comedian, writer and director

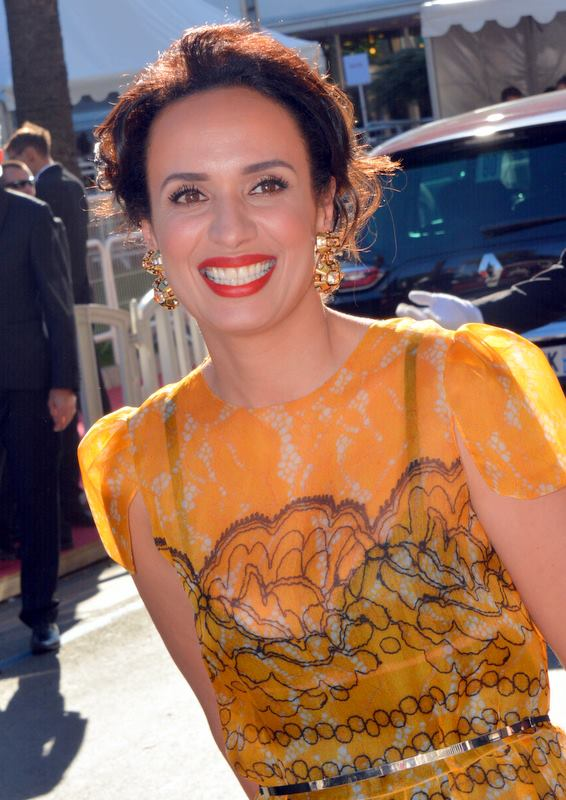
- Born: 21 August 1980 (age 46); Paris, France
- Occupations: actress, writer, film director
- Years active: 2002–present

Amelle Chahbi (born 21 August 1980) is a French comedian, writer and director.

== Biography ==
Of Algerian and Moroccan descent, she was born in Paris and trained at the school of the Théâtre international Béatrice Brou, with the ligue d'improvisation théâtrale de Paris and at the Marais Dance Centre. She began performing comedy at the open stages held at the Théâtre Trévise and at the Café Oscar in Paris. She was the opening act for performances by Jamel Debbouze and Tomer Sisley.

Chahbi appeared on the Comédie+ channel and caught the public eye when she began appearing on Canal+ as Miss Météo. She appeared regularly on Jamel Comedy Club. In 2010, she became part of the cast of the television show Ce soir avec Arthur; she left the show in 2012. She also appeared on the program Vendredi tout est permis avec Arthur.

She had a small role in the 2002 comedy Hypnotized and Hysterical (Hairstylist Wanted) (French title Filles perdues, cheveux gras). In 2009, she provided the voice of Chloé in the French version of the film Beverly Hills Chihuahua. She appeared in the 2009 film The Barons, the 2014 film Le Crocodile du Botswanga and the 2017 film Coexister.

In 2014, she directed her first film Amour sur place ou à emporter, based on her script for the play of the same name. The stage version had played to sold-out audiences.

== Filmography ==
Year	Title	Role	Director	Notes
2002	Hypnotized and Hysterical	Karine	Claude Duty	
2006	L'éclaireur	Linda	Djibril Glissant	
2009	The Barons	Malika	Nabil Ben Yadir	
2013	Joséphine	Rose	Agnès Obadia	
2013	Denis	Isabelle	Lionel Bailliu	
2014	Le Crocodile du Botswanga	Karina	Lionel Steketee & Fabrice Eboué	
2014	Amour sur place ou à emporter	Amelle	Amelle Chahbi	
2014	Scènes de ménages	Marion's friend	Francis Duquet	
2017	Coexister	Alexia Lejeune	Fabrice Eboué	
2019	All Inclusive	Sonia	Fabien Onteniente	
2020	Faites des gosses	Anissa	Philippe Lefebvre	TV series Filming

== Theater ==
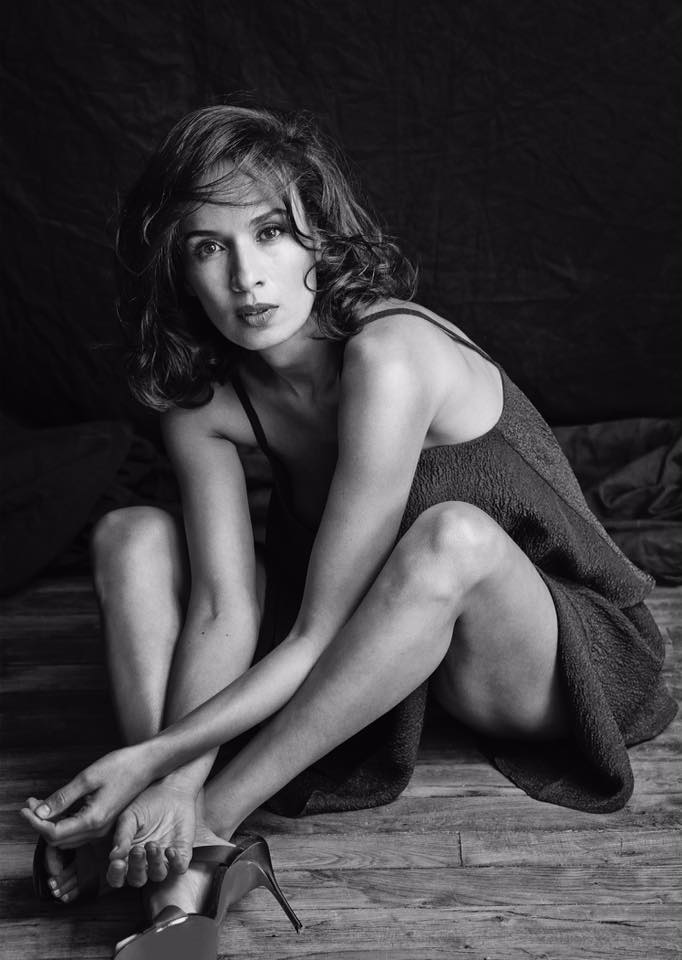

Year	Title	Author	Director	Notes
2011-2013	Amour sur place ou à emporter	Amelle Chahbi & Noom Diawara	Fabrice Éboué	
2016-2018	Où est Chahbi ?	Amelle Chahbi	Josiane Balasko	

== Personal life ==
From 2007 to 2018, Amelle is in couple with the actor and comedian Fabrice Éboué. On 15 January 2015 she gave birth to their first child, a boy named Nael. On 1 December 2018 Fabrice Eboué announced their separation after eleven years of relationship.
