= List of R.I.S, police scientifique episodes =

The following is a list of episodes of the French television series R.I.S, police scientifique.

Season 1 features 8 episodes, Season 2 features 12 episodes, Season 3 features 10 episodes, Season 4 and 5 features 16 episodes, Season 6 features 12 episodes while Season 7 features 8 episodes, season 8 features 12 episodes.

== Series overview ==
Series	Episodes	Originally released	
Series	Episodes	First released	Last released
1	8	12 January 2006	2 February 2006
2	12	11 January 2007	29 March 2007
3	10	24 January 2008	21 February 2008
4	16	4 September 2008	16 April 2009
5	16	15 October 2009	29 April 2010
6	10	9 December 2010	26 May 2011
7	8	16 February 2012	8 March 2012
8	12	10 January 2013	21 February 2013
9	8	30 January 2014	20 February 2014

== Episodes ==
=== Season 1 (2006) ===
No. overall	No. in season	Title	Directed by	Written by	Original release date	France viewers (millions)
1	1	"Broken Life"	Laurence Katrian	Stéphane Kaminka	12 January 2006	10.50
2	2	"Father in Trouble"	Laurence Katrian	Stéphane Kaminka	12 January 2006	9.30
3	3	"Nest of Vipers"	Laurence Katrian	Yves Ramonet	19 January 2006	9.96
4	4	"Fragile Beauty"	Laurence Katrian	Stéphane Kaminka & Chloé Marçais	19 January 2006	N/A
5	5	"Man Without Control (Part 1)"	Laurence Katrian	Fabienne Facco	26 January 2006	11.20
6	6	"Man Without Control (Part 2)"	Laurence Katrian	Fabienne Facco	26 January 2006	11.10
7	7	"Beauty of the Night"	Hervé Renoh	Massimo Bavastro	2 February 2006	10.70
8	8	"The Puzzle"	Hervé Renoh	Fabienne Facco	2 February 2006	N/A

=== Season 2 (2007) ===
No. overall	No. in season	Title	Directed by	Written by	Original release date	France viewers (millions)
9	1	"Love"	Dominique Tabuteau	Stéphane Kaminka & Laurent Vivier	11 January 2007	8.47
A woman was stabbed in the elevator of a large hotel. She was attending a bachelorette party. Soon, we also find a stabbed man on the back stairs.
10	2	"The Point of No Return"	Dominique Tabetau	Stéphane Kaminka	11 January 2007	7.29
11	3	"The Insiders (Part 1)"	Dominique Tabetau	Fabienne Facco & Stéphane Kaminka	18 January 2007	7.57
A university professor is found dead, with burnt hands and eyes. The RIS team is investigating. But when a lead presents itself to them, a young girl is found in her turn dead in the same circumstances.
12	4	"The Insiders (Part 2)"	Dominique Tabetau	Fabienne Facco & Stéphane Kaminka	18 January 2007	6.84
13	5	"Proof of Love"	Klaus Biedermann	Stéphane Kaminka	8 March 2007	9.64
A young woman is seized with a violent illness and dies in her office. Venturi, Julie and Nathalie discover that we have deposited poison in liquid form on the keyboard of his computer. In parallel, Hugo and Malik investigate the death of a drug addict.
14	6	"Lively Hearth"	Klaus Biedermann	Stéphane Kaminka & Kristel Mudry & Sébastien Vitoux	8 March 2007	8.07
Marc, Julie and Malik investigate the murder of an intern, found stabbed in the heart in a hospital. She recently went to a nightclub. Hugo and Nathalie, they are called following the disappearance of a singer.
15	7	"Misleading Appearances"	Klaus Biedermann	Stanislas Carré de Malberg & Razis Metlaine & Laurent Vivier & Stéphane Kaminka	15 March 2007	N/A
While Marc, Julie and Malik are investigating a robbery that went wrong and ended in the death of a young police lieutenant, Hugo and Nathalie seek to solve the murder of Mario Biasi, a famous photographer.
16	8	"Dependances"	Klaus Biedermann	Stéphane Kaminka & Armelle Robert & Fabienne Facco & Laurent Vivier	15 March 2007	N/A
A man is found with his throat cut in an empty apartment. Marc, Hugo and Julie will make the link with a prostitution case. Malik and Nathalie investigate the murder of an employee of a research laboratory.
17	9	"The Ransom for Life"	Christophe Douchand	Stanislas Carré de Malberg & Stéphane Kaminka	22 March 2007	7.68
Following a road accident, Marc, Nathalie and Hugo investigate with Morand the kidnapping of little Margot Dubreuil, a rich heiress. For their part, Malik and Julie investigate the death of a client of a strip club.
18	10	"The Shadow of Doubt"	Christophe Douchand	Loïc Belland & Stéphane Kaminka	22 March 2007	7.18
Two women are raped shortly before their marriage. Venturi, Nathalie and Julie are responsible for investigating. This affair plunges the latter into painful memories. In parallel, Hugo and Malik investigate the murder of a bus driver.
19	11	"Clairvoyance"	Christophe Douchand	Stéphane Kaminka & Kristel Mudry & Sébastien Vitoux	29 March 2007	N/A
20	12	"Weddings"	Christophe Douchand	Stéphane Kaminka & Laurent Vivier	29 March 2007	5.72
A man is found dead at the foot of the Sacré-Coeur. He apparently fell while trying to climb the monument. A young woman dies during a rollerblading ride. Note: Last regular appearance of Marc Venturi.

=== Season 3 (2008) ===
No. overall	No. in season	Title	Directed by	Written by	Original release date	France viewers (millions)
21	1	"The Path to the Stars"	Christophe Douchand	Emilie Clamart-Marsollat & Quoc Dang Tran & Laurent Vivier	24 January 2008	7.94
The body of a woman is found inside a lion, belonging to the circus that she owned. Note: First appearance of Gilles Sagnac.
22	2	"Lack of Taste"	Christophe Douchand	Emilie Clamart-Marsolla & Quoc Drang Tran & Laurent Vivier	24 January 2008	6.91
In the Parc des Buttes-Chaumont, we find the lifeless body of a food critic. He apparently froze to death. Sagnac, Hugo and Nathalie take charge of this affair. Malik and Julie, meanwhile, are investigating the death of an elderly lady, neglected by her nurse who did not answer her calls
23	3	"Cloaka Maxima"	Klaus Biedermann	Manon Dillys & Benjamin Dupont-Jubien & Stéphane Kaminka & Philippe Perret & Laurent Vivier	31 January 2008	6.80
24	4	"Blind Murders"	Christophe Douchand	Benjamin Dupont-Jubien	31 January 2008	6.23
25	5	"The Fanatic"	Klaus Biedermann	Stéphane Kaminka & Laurent Vivier	5 February 2008	7.26
A tennis player is found dead in her wrecked car. Sagnac, Hugo and Julie try to elucidate his death. At the same time, Malik and Nathalie are investigating the death of Sylvie Ortega, wife of the great stylist Simon Ortega.
26	6	"Judgment Day"	Gilles Béhat	Stanislas Carré de Malberg & Razis Metlaine	5 February 2008	6.12
On a construction site, we find the completely naked body of a man. Sagnac, Nathalie and Malik scour the clues in search of a clue. For their part, Julie and Hugo investigate the death of a singer, leader of a successful group.
27	7	"Crossfire"	Klaus Biederman	Kristel Mudry & Sébastien Vitoux & Laurent Vivier	14 February 2008	N/A
28	8	"Deep Waters"	Gilles Béhat	Stéphane Kaminka & Stanislas Carré de Malberg & Olivie Fox & Laurent Vivier	14 February 2008	N/A
In a car junkyard, the charred body of a firefighter is found inside a burnt out car. Sagnac, Mailk and Nathalie are investigating this case. For their part, Hugo and Julie must elucidate the circumstances of the death of a cyclist apparently caused by a road accident.
29	9	"IQ 149"	Christophe Barbier	Emilie Clamart-Marsollat & Stéphane Kaminka & Laurent Vivier	21 February 2008	6.23
A gifted teenager dies falling from the top of a building in a gifted school. Sagnac, Malik and Julie lead the investigation. Meanwhile, Alessandra is confronted with a case of abuse that will lead Hugo and Nathalie to the trail of a possible case of Münchhausen syndrome by proxy.
30	10	"The Light of Death"	Christophe Barbier	Laurentn Vivier & Stéphane Kaminka & Karin Spreuzkouski	21 February 2008	7.09
A man is found dead at the foot of a building. The victim bears a bite similar to that of a vampire. Sagnac, Nathalie and Hugo investigate. A trail opens up to them and leads them to a group of young Goths. At the same time, Martine reopens an investigation dating from 6 years ago, and instructs Malik and Julie to re-examine the clues because this case is far from being closed

=== Season 4 (2008−09) ===
No. overall	No. in season	Title	Directed by	Written by	Original release date	France viewers (millions)
31	1	"In The Prime of Youth"	Hervé Renoh	Christophe Joaquin & Nicolas Simonin & Benjamin Dupont-Jubien	4 September 2008	6.87
Two forensic scientists are found dead in rather disturbing circumstances. Sagnac and his team are leading the investigation. But while they are on a track, Alessandra remains unreachable. Would she have crossed paths with the assassin? Note: First appearance of Frédéric Arthaud.
32	2	"Meteor Express"	Alain Choquart	Stéphane Carrié & Nadège de Miroschedji	4 September 2008	5.95
A young girl dies on her birthday. Everything suggests that his death was accidental. Sagnac, Julie and Hugo are investigating, but this affair has many surprises in store for them. For their part, Nathalie and Malik try to elucidate the circumstances of the death of a man found in his car in the Bois de Boulogne
33	3	"An Eye for An Eye"	Christophe Barbier	Claire Barre & Vincent Robert	11 September 2008	6.58
The body of a supposedly illegal immigrant is found tied up under a bus. Sagnac, Nathalie and Malik investigate, but this affaure reserves them many surprises. For their part, Julie and Hugo must elucidate the death of a woman found hanged in the premises of her company
34	4	"Guaranteed Anonymity"	Jean-Marc Seban	Patrick Renault	11 September 2008	5.38
The assistant to the manager of an investment bank is found dead in the ultra-armored safe. Sagnac, Hugo and Julie try to clarify this affair. Meanwhile, Malik, supported by Eloise, investigate the death of a retiree, which occurred at her home
35	5	"Manhunt"	Alain Choquart	Christophe Joaquin & Nicolas Simonin & Laurent Vivier & Benjamin Dupont-Jubien	18 September 2008	5.72
A deaf and dumb young cycling champion is found unconscious and injured in the face. Nevertheless, traces of GHB are found in his body via examinations. Sagnac, Hugo and Julie lead the investigation, which plunges the latter into painful memories. At the same time, the body of a man deemed violent was found riddled with dozens of bullet holes. Malik, with the help of Eloise and Fred, is responsible for solving the case.
36	6	"Blind Spot"	Eric Le Roux	Laurent Vivier & Benjamin Dupont-Jubien	18 September 2008	4.81
Two corpses are found in a luxury suite in a large hotel. One is that of a delinquent, the other. the wife of the boss of the Stups'! What happened? The entire RIS team is mobilized to resolve this matter.
37	7	"Final Act"	?	Benjamin Dupont-Jubien & Delinda Jacobs	25 September 2008	N/A
A great novelist and Hugo's friend dies crushed by a chandelier. The latter, supported by Sagnac and Julie, leads the investigation. For their part, Malik and Nathalie are interested in the death of a young woman in a tanning center.
38	8	"Everywhere Where You'll Go"	Jean-Marc Seban	Stéphane Carrié & Delinda Jacobs & Benjamin Dupont-Jubien	25 September 2008	N/A
A decomposing corpse is found in one of the amphitheatres of La Sorbonne. He is identified as a student at the university. The RIS team begins the investigations.
39	9	"The Alleged Killer"	Alexandre Laurent	Laurent Vivier	26 March 2009	N/A
The body of a young woman is found at the home of a famous lawyer who immediately admits having had a relationship with her for a month. Could it be a crime of passion? Sagnac, Hugo and Nathalie lead the investigation. For their part, Malik and Julie are confronted with the death of a sexagenarian whose widow claims that he was killed by a ghost.
40	10	"Coldblooded Murder"	Eric Le Roux	Claire Barre & Benjamin Dupont-Jubien & Vincent Robert	26 March 2009	N/A
A wax moulder was found dead after an evening at the Grévin museum. Sagnac, Julie and Malik lead the investigation. They find traces of a product intended to make cotton candy on the victim's shirt. In parallel, Hugo and Nathalie are investigating the death of a 22-year-old student, whose blood is green.
41	11	"Sleepless Night"	Jérôme Navarro	Benjamin Dupont-Jubien & Patrick Renault	2 April 2009	N/A
During the White Night in Paris, we find a haggard woman in the street. She confides that she was raped. Sagnac, Malik and Julie are responsible for investigating, the past of the latter resurfacing. For their part, Hugo and Nathalie must elucidate the death of a man found in the garden of a house, a nail stuck between the two eyes
42	12	"Boomerang"	Alain Choquart	Natascha Cucheval & Karin Spreuzkouski & Benjamin Dupont-Jubien	2 April 2009	N/A
A woman is found dead in the Canal Saint-Martin. A little later, we find the corpse of her husband. They both ran a jewelry store. Sagnac, Hugo and Nathalie are responsible for clarifying this affair. At the same time, Malik and Julie are confronted with the death of a man found stabbed in a parking lot
43	13	"The Flying Coffin"	Christophe Barbier	Delinda Jacobs & Xavier Dounin & Benjamin Dupont-Jubien	9 April 2009	6.59
A private plane lands in Paris-Sud. The whole crew is dead. The entire RIS team faces tough investigations.
44	14	"You'll Be a Man"	François Guérin	?	9 April 2009	6.40
45	15	"In The Shadow of The Paradise"	Christophe Barbier	Claire Barre & Vincent Robert & Emilie Clamart-Marsollat	16 April 2009	6.24
A man dies at a table in Paradise, a prestigious Parisian cabaret. A little later, we discover the lifeless body of another man behind the scenes. Are the two deaths linked? Sagnac, Malik and Nathalie must answer this question by clarifying the matter. At the same time, the corpse of a young girl is found in a skate park. Accident, murder? Hugo and Julie investigate to find out.
46	16	"Manners"	Alain Choquart	Stéphane Carrié & Nadège de Miroschedji & Benjamin Dupont-Jubien	16 April 2009	5.38
A woman, a wealthy rally organizer, dies while driving her car, a bullet to her heart. Sagnac, Hugo and Nathalie try to understand what happened. For their part, Malik and Julie are faced with the death of a retiree found at his home.Note: Last regular appearance of lieutenant Martine Forest.

=== Season 5 (2009−10) ===
No. overall	No. in season	Title	Directed by	Written by	Original release date	France viewers (millions)
47	1	"The Temptation (Part 1)"	Eric LaRoux	Stéphane Kaminka & Patrick Renault & Benjamin Dupont-Jubien & Karin Spreuzkouski & Krystel Bazex & Julie Boucher	15 October 2009	6.51
The RIS team is faced with several cases. On the one hand the disappearance of a young girl in a home for difficult teenagers, and on the other a trial whose progress has taken a new turn with the discovery of new elements. Note: First appearance of Katia Schriver.
48	2	"The Temptation (Part 2)"	Eric La Roux	Stéphane Kaminka & Benjamin Dupont-Jubien & Patrick Renault & Karin Spreuzkouski & Krystel Bazex & Julie Boucher	15 October 2009	5.98
Still in the process of clarifying the Jaugaret and Gernot cases, a third has been added to the table. Nathalie and Eloise are responsible for investigating, but this case is far from being as simple as it seems.
49	3	"The Faith"	Alexandre Laurent	Delinda Jacobs & Benjamin Dupont-Jubien	22 October 2009	6.67
Note: Last appearance of Nathalie Giesbert.
50	4	"Alibi"	Jean-Marc Seban	Karin Spreuzkouski & Emilie Clamart-Marsollat	22 October 2009	5.75
51	5	"Celebrities"	François Guérin	Emilie Clamart-Marsollat	29 October 2009	6.60
Chiara, a famous actress, has been defenestrated. The suspicions fall on her husband Stan. At the same time, a young woman is found dead in a wood, probably hit by a car.
52	6	"The Flowers of Evil"	Jean-Marc Thérin	Patrick Renault & Bruno Ore & Denis Lima & Benjamin Dupont-Jubien	29 October 2009	5.58
53	7	"Deadly Parade"	François Guérin	Stéphane Carrié & Benjamin Dupont-Jubien	5 November 2009	N/A
During a military parade on the Champs-Élysées on July 14, a tank driver was assassinated. The RIS must collaborate with the military experts on this investigation, and the former head of the lab Marc Venturi is tasked by his army superiors with helping his former scientific police colleagues. Note: Last appearance of Marc Venturi.
54	8	"Internall Fire"	Jérôme Navarro	Benjamin Dupont-Jubien	5 November 2009	N/A
55	9	"Dry Cleaning"	Alexandre Laurent	Nadège de Miroschedji & Benjamin Dupont-Jubien & Stéphane Kaminka & Krystel Bazex	1 April 2010	N/A
Note: Last regular appearance of lieutenant Martine Forest.
56	10	"Last Travel"	Jean-Marc Thérin	Benjamin Dupont-Jubien & Xavier Dounin & Stéphane Kaminka & Krystel Bazex	1 April 2010	N/A
57	11	"Beautiful Then Me"	François Guérin	Emilie Clamart-Marsollat & Stéphane Kaminka & Krystel Bazex	8 April 2010	N/A
58	12	"Blood Wedding"	Vincent Giovanni	Patrick Renault & Benjamin Dupont-Jubien & Stéphane Kaminka & Krystel Bazex	8 April 2010	N/A
59	13	"On The Line of Fire"	Jean-Marc Thérin	Stéphane Carrié & Benjamin Dupont-Jubien & Stéphane Kaminka & Krystel Bazex	15 April 2010	6.60
A shootout breaks out near a supermarket. Malik, who heard the radio call, goes there. A policewoman is the victim of a stray bullet and Malik is suspected of being the author of the gunshot that killed her.
60	14	"The Explosive"	Alexandre Laurent	Olivier Fox & Benjamin Dupont-Jubien & Stéphane Kaminka & Krystel Bazex	15 April 2010	6.60
61	15	"Early Retirement"	Alexandre Laurent	Delinda Jacobs & Bemjamin Dupont-Jubien & Stéphane Kaminka & Krystel Bazex	22 April 2010	6.30
62	16	"Under the Pressure"	Eric La Roux	Emilie Clamart-Marsollat & Krystel Bazex	29 April 2010	5.80

=== Season 6 (2010−11) ===
No. overall	No. in season	Title	Directed by	Written by	Original release date	France viewers (millions)
63	1	"Rage Attack"	Alexandre Laurent	Stéphanie Cotta & Stanuslas de Mallberg & Benjamin Dupont-Jubien	9 December 2010	6.25
64	2	"Kickback"	Jean-Marc Thérin	?	16 December 2010	N/A
65	3	"Requiem Assassin"	Jean-Marc Thérin	Benjamin Dupont-Jubien & Patrick Renault	5 May 2011	N/A
The guitarist of The Smash (alias Decibel Circus), Erwan Guillermo, collapses during a concert at the Casino de Paris . Everything suggests that this is his lifelong friend, the singer of the group. Malik, meanwhile, comes to the aid of Cécile Challonges whose apartment has been broken into.
66	4	"Hemorrhage"	?	?	5 May 2010	N/A
67	5	"Till Death Do Us Part"	Julien Despaux	Karin Spreuzkouski & Emilie Clamart-Marsollat	12 May 2011	N/A
68	6	"Suspicious Death"	Jean-Mark Rudnicki	Emilie Clamart-Marsollat & Benjamin Dupont-Jubien	12 May 2011	N/A
The RIS team is investigating a health scandal: a factory is responsible for serious fertility problems among its employees. Note: Last appearance of Gilles Sagnac and Hugo Chalonges.
69	7	"Red Zone"	Alexandre Laurent	Nicolas Jean & Grégoire Demaisson & Benjamin Dupont-Jubien & Jean-Mark Rudnicki	19 May 2011	N/A
A motorcycle rider is discovered dead near a circuit. Was it a tragic accident or was he helped to take the “big leap”? RIS investigators try to clarify the case while wondering who will be their new boss after Sagnac leaves. Could it be Commander Vernon, in charge of this new affair? Note: First appearance of commander Maxime Vernon.
70	8	"Mad Love"	Jean-Marc Rudnicki	Laurent Vivier & Franck Calderon	19 May 2011	N/A
71	9	"On the Spot"	Eric La Roux	Delinda Jacobs & Frederika Patard	26 May 2011	N/A
72	10	"Timeout"	Julien Despoux	Nadège de Miroschedji & Emilie Clamart-Marsollat & Robin Bataraud & Franck Calderon	26 May 2011	N/A

=== Season 7 (2012) ===
No. overall	No. in season	Title	Directed by	Written by	Original release date	France viewers (millions)
73	1	"Centre of the Heart (Part 1)"	Yann Le Gal	Yann Le Gal & Stéphane Kaminka	16 February 2012	6.36
A bus explodes in the middle of the street, killing three and injuring several. A bomb in a satchel. Is it a terrorist attack? In fact, the bomb would have exploded too soon and targeted the Socopic company. Everything quickly points to one of the victims: Éric Guérault, an employee whose job was threatened. The investigation takes a whole new turn when the prime suspect turns out to be Julie's boyfriend. She is accused of complicity. Captain Legrain of the DCRI takes over the affair… The RIS will have to redouble their efforts to prove the innocence of their comrade
74	2	"Sad Tomorrow (Part 2)"	Eric La Roux	Yann Le Gal & Stéphane Kaminka	16 February 2012	6.27
Note: Last appearance of Julie Labro.
75	3	"Blue Diamond"	Thierry Boutiller	Franck Calderon & Virgile Brami & France Colbert & Stéphane Kaminka	23 February 2012	5.45
Note:: First appearance of Émilie Durringer.
76	4	"Black Magic"	Julien Zidi	Ida Mortemart & Stéphane Kaminka	23 February 2012	4.84
77	5	"The Price of Perfection"	Hérve Brami	Yann Le Gal	1 March 2012	6.34
78	6	"Maste of Canvas"	Julien Zidi	Sophie Baren & Yann Le Gal	1 March 2012	5.40
79	7	"Night Taxi"	Claire de la Rochefoucauld	Yann Le Gal	8 March 2012	6.50
80	8	"Gunshot"	Claire de la Rochefoucauld	Ingrid Desjours & Yann Le Gal	8 March 2012	5.50

=== Season 8 (2013) ===
No. overall	No. in season	Title	Directed by	Written by	Original release date	France viewers (millions)
81	1	"Shadow From the Past"	Hervé Renoh	Virgile Brami & Yann Le Gal	10 January 2017	5.37
A man is kidnapped in the middle of a shopping center with the eyes and the beard of the crowd. His body is found by Maxime Vernon in the trash can of his own building. The latter quickly realizes that this is the new victim of Boxer, a serial killer whom he tracked down during his assignment to the Crim. The opportunity is then given to him to find his former colleague and to finally be able to make peace with his past.
82	2	"London/Paris"	Alexandre Laurent	Yann Le Gal	10 January 2013	4.71
During a London / Paris flight, two passengers (one English and one French) are murdered in two different ways. The RIS team must then join forces with an invading Scotland Yard team to resolve this matter.
83	3	"The Fugitive"	Julien Zidi	Basile Minatchy & Emanuelle Scali & Yann Le Gal	17 January 2013	N/A
The driver of a sulky seems to have been trampled to death by his horse in his box. The RIS is surprised to have been sent on what appears to be an accident. Only Maxime is convinced of the contrary with a relentlessness which surprises everyone. The RIS does not take long to realize that if Maxime is taking care of this business it is because his daughter, with whom he is in trouble, has asked him for help. She is convinced that the horse could not kill its driver!
84	4	"Cinderella & Company"	René Mazor	Nadège de Miroschedji & Yann Le Gal	17 January 2013	N/A
As the fashion show comes to an end and the crowd calls out for the designer, he… collapses on the dead catwalk. The RIS hastens to collect all the evidence to conduct the investigation… except that the RIS car containing all the evidence is blackjacked
85	5	"Wraith"	Claire de la Rochefoucauld	Ide Mortemart	24 January 2013	N/A
A psychic is found murdered in a house that appears to be haunted. Between science and belief, the members of the RIS wonder about the strange phenomena that they keep encountering.
86	6	"The Time We Have"	Alain Brunard	France Corbet & Alexia de Oliveira Gomez	24 January 2013	N/A
A senior investigating judge experiences discomfort in court just after serial killer Bellen announces his desire to take revenge on her. Alessandra, who was testifying against Bellen, confirms that the judge has poison and that she has only three days to die. For once, the RIS can rely on a still living victim to find the culprit.
87	7	"Woman from the Shadow"	Claire de la Rochefoucauld	Virgile Brami	31 January 2013	N/A
88	8	"Natural Death"	Thierry Bouteiller	Emilie Clamart-Marsollat & Yann Le Gal	31 January 2013	N/A
89	9	"Stormy Waters"	Gilles Mailard	Ingrid Desjours & Medhi Ouahab	7 February 2013	N/A
90	10	"Dangerous Faith"	Julien Zidi	Laurent Vivier & Yann Le Gal	7 February 2013	N/A
91	11	"The Threat (Part 1)"	Hervé Brami	Virgile Brami & Yann Le Gal	21 February 2013	N/A
92	12	"Double Game (Part 2)"	Hervé Brsmi	Virgile Brami & Yann Le Gal	21 February 2013	N/A
Note: Last appearance of commander Maxime Vernon and Katia Schriver.

=== Season 9 (2014) ===
No. overall	No. in season	Title	Directed by	Written by	Original release date
93	1	"Stone Grave (Part 2)"	Hervé Brami	Christian Mouchart & Patrick Triangle	30 January 2014
Note: First appearance of commandant Lucie Ballak.
94	2	"Stone Grave (Part 2)"	Hervé Brami	Christian Mouchart & Patrick Triangle	30 January 2014
95	3	"The Bay"	Julien Zidi	Basile Minatchy & Emanuelle Scali & Yann Le Gal	6 February 2014
96	4	"Family Secret"	Julien Zidi	France Corbet	6 February 2014
97	5	"The Gorgon"	Julien Zidi	Mehdi Ouahab	13 February 2014
98	6	"The Rat & the Dancer"	Olivier Barma	Jean-Marie Chavent & Thomas Luntz	13 February 2014
99	7	"Freefall (Part 1)"	Hervé Brami	Laure de Corbet & Alexandra Julhiet	20 February 2014
100	8	"Freefall (Part 2)"	Hervé Brami	Christian Mouchart & Patrick Triangle	20 February 2014
