= Ruben Alves =

French-Portuguese actor and film director

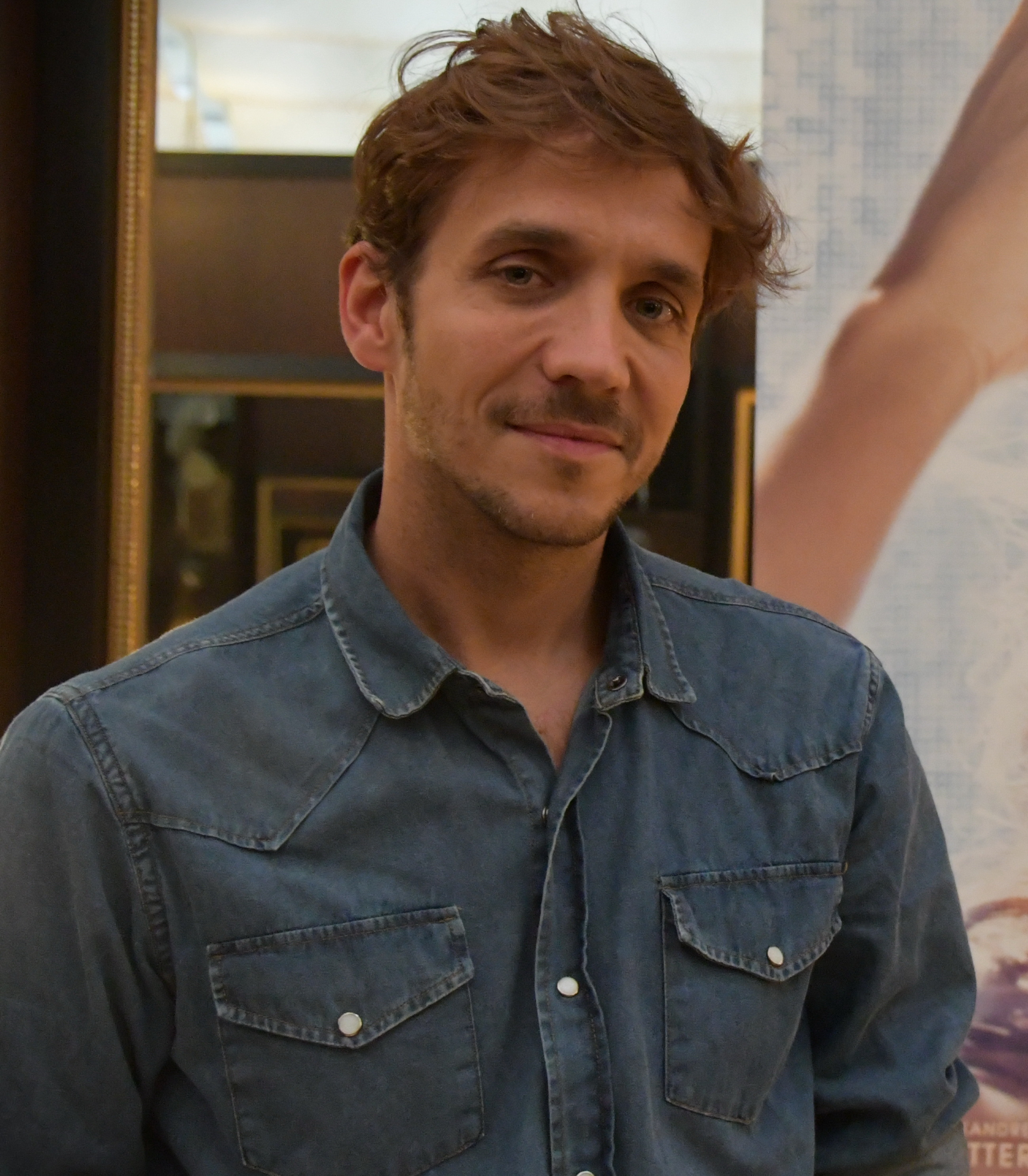
- Alves in 2020
- Born: 9 January 1980 (age 46); Paris, France
- Occupations: Actor; screenwriter; director
- Years active: 2000–present

Ruben Alves (born 9 January 1980) is a French-Portuguese actor, screenwriter, and director. He is best known for The Gilded Cage which he wrote and directed.

== Biography ==
Alves was born the son of Portuguese guest workers in Paris. At 20, he became a full-time actor and initially played minor roles in French television productions and in some short films.

His directorial debut, apart from a short film in 2002 'À l'abri des regards indiscrets', was in 2013 with the immigrant comedy La cage dorée. The film was inspired by his parents' biography, and Alves has a small guest role in the film as 'Miguel'. The movie has been a great success in France and Portugal, and has also been followed by a number of other countries, including Australia. In Portugal, it became in 2013 the most watched film of the year, with 755 000 viewings. In Germany he came as Portugal, mon amour in the cinemas. The film had 1.2m spectators in France and sold well internationally.

Alves played in 2014 in Yves Saint Laurent, a biopic about the life of the fashion designer Yves Saint Laurent.

In 2017, he directed a documentary As Vozes do Fado (or "The Voices of Fado") with Christophe Fonseca, screened at the Le Lincoln Cinema, Paris. A CD "Amália: Vozes do Fado" was released later, a homage to Amália Rodrigues, a Fado singer.

In 2018, he started working on an upcoming comedy called Miss, by producer-director Hugo Gelin with co-star model Alex Wetter as a young man who sets his heart on winning the Miss France contest.

== Personal life ==
In 2017, he currently lives in Bairro Alto, Lisbon, where he used to take holidays when living in Paris.

== Filmography ==
=== Film ===
Year	Title	Role
2001	La vie sans secret de Walter Nions (Short)	Frère Diane
2002	À l'abri des regards indiscrets (Short)	Pierre-Cyril
2004	La chepor (Short)	Vendeur boutique 1
2004	Pédale dure	Fripounet
2005	Un truc dans le genre	Youssef
2006	Madame Irma	Le serveur gastrologique
2008	Secrets of State	La nouvelle recrue
2013	The Gilded Cage	Miguel
2014	Yves Saint Laurent	Fernando Sanchez
2015	Tales from the Circus (Short)	Will
2016	Two Is a Family	Serveur soirée

=== TV ===
Year	Title	Role	Notes
2002	Madame le proviseur	(unnamed role)	TV series, 1 episode
2004	Même âge, même adresse	(unnamed role)	TV series, 1 episode
2005	Clara Sheller	Hervé	TV series, 2 episodes
2006	Le juge est une femme	Sébastien	TV series, 1 episode
2006	C com-ç@	Florian	TV series, 1 episode
2008	Les Bougon	(unnamed role)	TV series, 1 episode
2009	La fille au fond du verre à saké	Joaquim	TV series, 1 episode
2010	Maison Close	Policier #1	TV series, 2 episodes
2010	Empreintes criminelles	Robert	TV series, 1 episode

=== Director ===
Year	Title
2002	À l'abri des regards indiscrets (Short)
2013	The Gilded Cage
2017	As Vozes do Fado (Documentary)
2020	Miss
2026	Santo António - O Casamenteiro de Lisboa
