= Case départ =

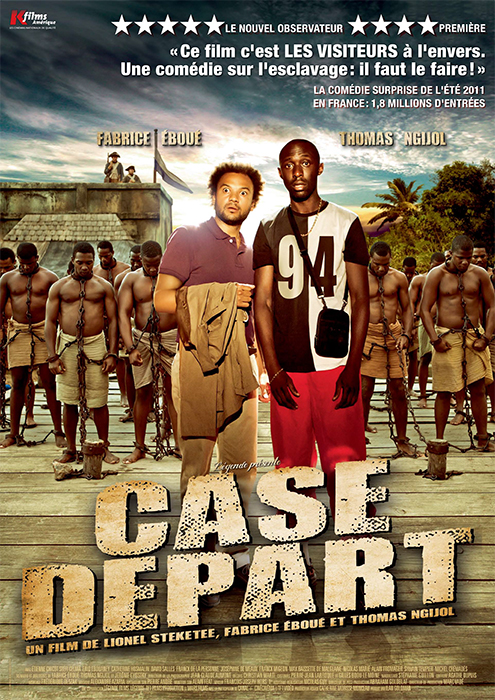
- Directed by: Lionel Steketee; Fabrice Eboué; Thomas N'Gijol
- Written by: Fabrice Eboué; Thomas N'Gijol; Jérôme L'hotsky
- Produced by: Alain Goldman; Catherine Morisse
- Starring: Fabrice Eboué; Thomas N'Gijol
- Cinematography: Jean-Claude Aumont
- Edited by: Frédérique Olszak
- Music by: Alexandre Azaria
- Production companies: Légende Films; TF1 Films Production; Canal+
- Distributed by: Mars Distribution
- Release date: 6 July 2011
- Running time: 94 minutes
- Country: France
- Language: French
- Budget: $8 million
- Box office: $16.4 million

Case départ (Tee box) is a 2011 French comedy film directed by Lionel Steketee, Fabrice Eboué and Thomas N'Gijol.

== Plot ==
Half-brothers Régis (Fabrice Eboue) and Joel (Thomas N'Gijol) Grosdésir are called to their estranged father's deathbed in the French Antilles. He has nothing to bequeath them but the family treasure - the certificate of manumission that freed their common ancestor from slavery.

Unfortunately Régis and Joel are observed by their aunt (Isabel del Carmen Solar Montalvo) as they tear the precious document up and mock it. She is enraged and casts a spell to send them back to the 18th century, where they are immediately picked up and sold as slaves. In a Back to the Future style coming-of-age storyline they must help their great-grandparents to meet and fall in love, if they have any hope of returning to their lives - or to a better version of themselves.

== Cast ==
- Fabrice Eboué – Régis Grosdésir
- Thomas N'Gijol – Joël Grosdésir
- Stéfi Celma – Rosalie
- Eriq Ebouaney – Isidore
- Joséphine de Meaux – Joséphine Jourdain
- Catherine Hosmalin – Madame Jourdain
- Étienne Chicot – Monsieur Jourdain
- Blanche Gardin – Corinne
- Nicolas Marié – The Mayor
- Franck de la Personne – The Priest
- David Salles – M Henri
- Doudou Masta – Neg' Marron's Chief
