= Éric Toledano and Olivier Nakache =

French filmmaking duo

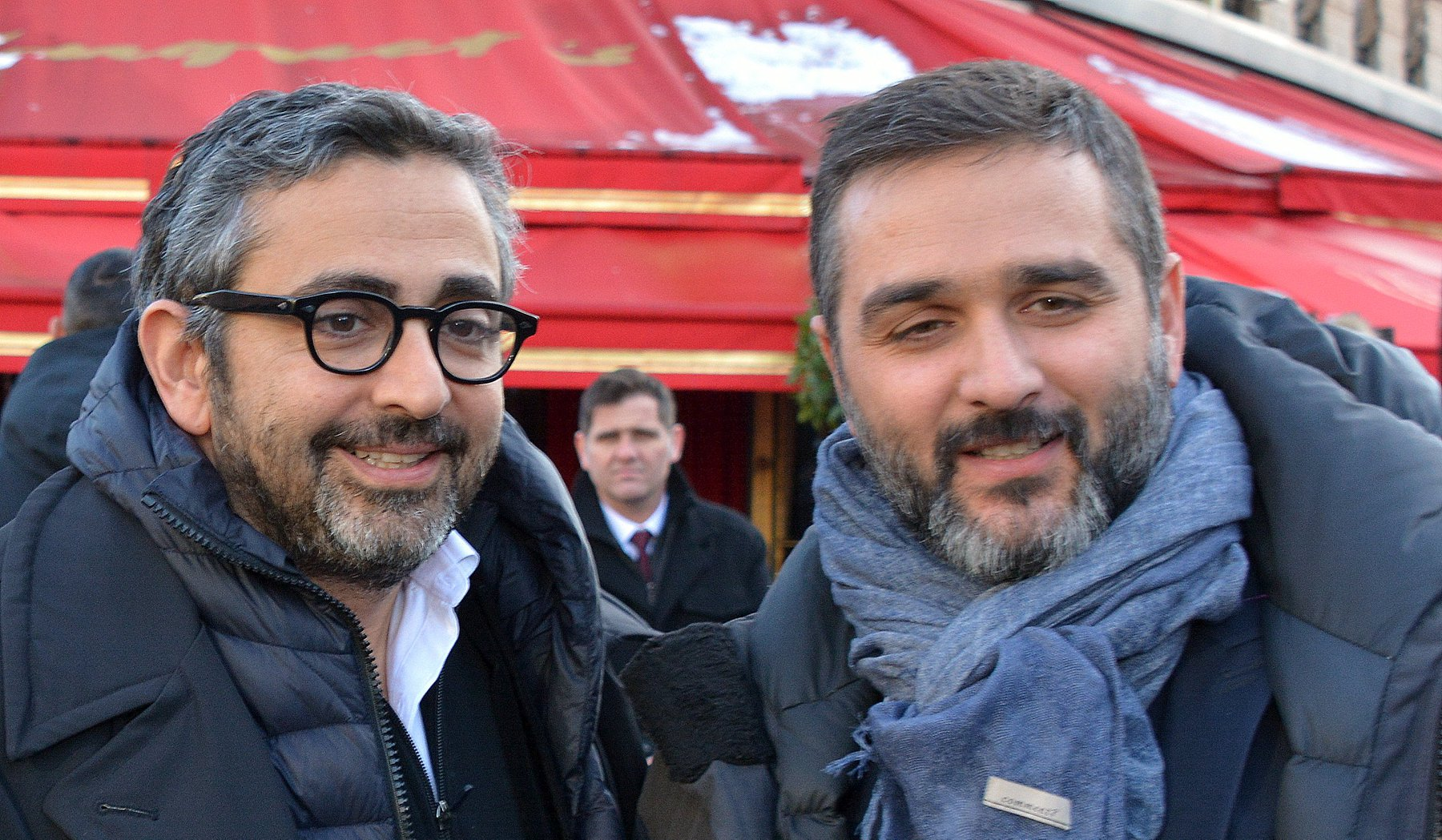
- Éric Toledano (left) and Olivier Nakache (right)
- Born: Éric Toledano; 3 July 1971 (age 55); Paris, France Olivier Nakache; 15 April 1973 (age 53); Suresnes, France
- Occupation: Filmmakers
- Years active: 1995–present

Éric Toledano (born 3 July 1971) and Olivier Nakache (born 15 April 1973) are French filmmakers, best known for directing the films Those Happy Days (2006) and The Intouchables (2011).

== Early life ==
Éric Toledano was born on 3 July 1971 in Paris. Olivier Nakache was born on 15 April 1973 in Suresnes, Hauts-de-Seine.

Toledano and Nakache are both Jewish. Toledano's parents were immigrants from Morocco, while Nakache's parents were from Algeria.

== Career ==
Toledano and Nakache collaborated several times before directing The Intouchables (2011), which became one of the greatest box office successes in French film history and for which they were nominated for several awards, including three Cesar Awards. They have collaborated several times with actor Omar Sy, most recently in the 2014 film Samba.

Their 2019 film The Specials stars Vincent Cassel and Reda Kateb. The film shows Parisians from many different groups in society making connections with each other through their work with autistic children and young people.

Toledano and Nakache directed En thérapie, the French version of the Israeli series BeTipul, created by Hagai Levi, about a psychologist and his patients. It debuted on Arte TV in January 2021, starring Frédéric Pierrot, Mélanie Thierry, Reda Kateb, Clémence Poésy, Pio Marmaï, and Carole Bouquet. The series is set in the aftermath of the Bataclan attack in 2015. A second season was aired from April 2022, with each series comprising 35 episodes. The show aired on SBS Television in Australia as In Therapy.

Their film, A Difficult Year, premiered at the 2023 Toronto Film Festival.

Their 2026 film "Just an illusion" drew on their own adolescence and was dedicated to their fathers, who died during filming.

== Filmography ==
Year	Title	Role	Notes
1995	Le jour et la nuit	Director & writer	Short
1999	Les petits souliers	Director & writer	Short
1999	La part de l'ombre	Director	Short
2005	Let's Be Friends	Director & writer	
2006	Our Happy Days	Director, writer & actor	
2009	Tellement proches	Director & writer	
2011	The Intouchables	Director & writer	Became the second highest-grossing French film in France upon release
2014	Samba	Director & writer	
2015	Learn by Heart	Producer	Directed by Mathieu Vadepied
2016	One Man and His Cow	Co-producer	Directed by Mohamed Hamidi
2017	C'est la vie !	Director & writer	
2019	The Specials	Director & writer	
2021–2022	In Therapy	Creator	TV series
2022	Les Rencontres du Papotin	Creator	
2023	A Difficult Year	Director & writer	
2023	Phantom Youth	Producer	Directed by Luàna Bajrami
2026	Just an illusion	Director & writer	French title: Juste une illusion
