= Fredrik Brattberg =

Norwegian playwright

Fredrik Brattberg (born 30 October 1978) is a Norwegian playwright. His plays have been translated into thirty languages and staged world wide.

In a portrait made by The Norwegian Broadcasting Corporation - NRK - it is written "In France, Germany and Czech Republic Brattberg is staged on the biggest theatres and described as a genius in the national newspapers". *

Brattberg has won The Ibsen Award and the Ferdinand Vanek Award. He has been nominated to Prix Godot and The Hedda Award.
