= Serial (Bad) Weddings 2 =

2019 comedy film

- Film poster
- French: Qu'est-ce qu'on a (encore) fait au Bon Dieu?
- Directed by: Philippe de Chauveron
- Written by: Philippe de Chauveron; Guy Laurent
- Produced by: Romain Rojtman
- Starring: Christian Clavier; Chantal Lauby; Ary Abittan; Medi Sadoun
- Cinematography: Stephane Le Parc
- Edited by: Alice Polantin
- Music by: Marc Chouarian
- Production companies: Les Films du Premier; Les Films du 24; TF1 Films Production
- Distributed by: UGC Distribution (France); Belga Films (Belgium)
- Release date: 30 January 2019
- Running time: 98 minutes
- Countries: France; Belgium
- Language: French
- Budget: $18.2 million
- Box office: $87.8 million

Serial Bad Weddings 2 (French: Qu'est-ce qu'on a (encore) fait au Bon Dieu?, lit. 'What have we (still) done to the Good Lord?') is a 2019 Belgian-French comedy film directed by Philippe de Chauveron. It is the second installment in the Serial (Bad) Weddings film series and a sequel to 2014 film of the same name, it follows the Verneuil family, an upper-class French Catholic couple portrayed by Christian Clavier and Chantal Lauby from a French province and their four daughters, three who married men of different faiths and one who married outside their race.

The film was the highest grossing French production in France in 2019 and the third highest-grossing film of 2019 in France. A third installment, Serial (Bad) Weddings 3, is set to be released in April 2022.

== Cast ==
- Christian Clavier as Claude Verneuil
- Chantal Lauby as Marie Verneuil
- Ary Abittan as David Benichou
- Medi Sadoun as Rashid Ben Assem
- Frédéric Chau as Chao Ling
- Noom Diawara as Charles Kofi
- Frédérique Bel as Isabelle Ben Assem Verneuil
- Julia Piaton as Odile Benichou Verneuil
- Émilie Caen as Ségolène Ling Verneuil
- Élodie Fontan as Laure Verneuil
- Pascal N'Zonzi as André Kofi, Father of Charles
- Salimata Kamate as Madeleine Kofi, Mother of Charles
- Tatiana Rojo as Viviane Kofi, Sister of Charles
- Claudia Tagbo as Nicole
- Marie-Hélène Lentini as Guilaine Monfau

== Release ==
Serial (Bad) Weddings 2 was released in France and Belgium on January 30, 2019. The film grossed over 45 million Euros from 7 million admissions in France which made it break a four-year record for a local language film. The film received a theatrical release in several countries, including Germany, Switzerland and Canada. A third film in the series has been planned.

As of December 1, 2019, the film was in third place on the 2019 chart having attracted 6.7 million admissions, for a box office of $47.7m making it the third highest-grossing film in France in 2019 and the highest grossing French production in 2019. Melanie Goodfellow noted that "In spite of this stellar performance, the box office was 45% lower than for the original 2014 Serial Bad Weddings, which drew a mighty 12.4 million spectators ($91m).

== Reception ==
The film received mixed reviews from critics. Jordan Mintzer of The Hollywood Reporter stated that the film "feels like a slight improvement on the first movie, delivering a few mild laughs amid a similar onslaught of overwrought gags, over-the-top performances and “can’t we all just get along?” messaging meant to lure Frenchies into theaters so they can chortle at their own cultural differences — if not at their countrymen's latent racism." The review concluded that "What may ultimately be most offensive about these movies is not what they’re trying to say, but how they say it."
