= Émilie Caen =

French actress

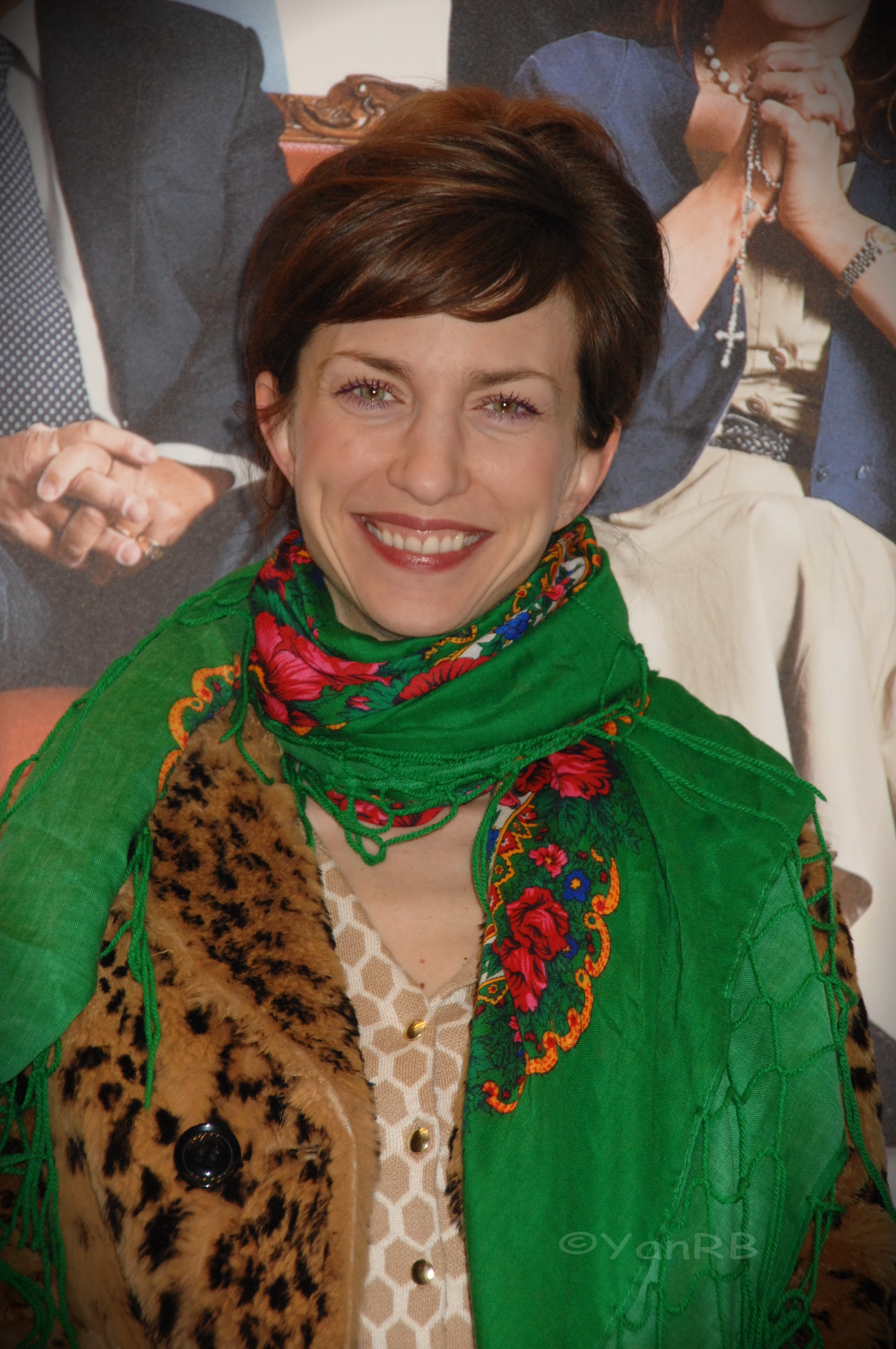
- Caen in 2014
- Born: 12 November 1977 (age 49); France
- Occupation: Actress
- Years active: 2004–present

Émilie Caen (French: [emili kɑ̃]) is a French actress. Born on November 12th, 1977, she is known for playing the role of Ségolène in Serial (Bad) Weddings.

== Biography ==
Thanks to her mother, who regularly took her to the theater, Emilie decided to become an actress. After graduating from high school, she enrolled at the Perimony drama school in 1997, where she trained for three years. In the years that followed, she continued her training at the Pygmalion studio, then joined an Actor's Studio workshop.

At the same time, Emilie Caen began her career on stage: Sur la grande route, Bal-Trap, L'illusion comique. Later, she made her television debut with small roles in Spécial Camera Café, Commissaire Cordier and Sections de recherches.

The French film family opened its doors to her a little later, in 2007, with a role in the Franco-Canadian romance Jusqu'à toi alongside Mélanie Laurent. She then played the gallery owner in the lucrative Intouchables, France's biggest hit of 2011.

The actress continued her career in other comedies produced in France, landing small roles in Michaël Youn's Vive la France and La Clinique de l'amour by her friend Artus de Penguern, who called on her again when he shot the Benjamin video for singer Florent Marchet.

In 2012, she landed the lead role in a duet with Michèle Bernier in the TF1 series Injustice, in which she plays her assistant.

In 2013, viewers discovered the actress in a brand-new role: Nadine Pitou, the elementary school teacher in the TF1 series Pep's. The series was a great success (record audience of 8.6 million).

In 2014, she starred in the comedy Qu'est-ce qu'on a fait au Bon Dieu? She plays Ségolène, one of the daughters of the Verneuil family, a depressive painter who marries a Chinese man, much to the chagrin of her parents, played by Chantal Lauby and Christian Clavier.

In 2015, she also appeared in the mini-series Le Mystère du lac broadcast on TF1.

In 2016, she played the lead role in an episode of Joséphine, ange gardien: Enfants, mode d'emploi. Now a star of the small and big screen, she joined the cast of the event mini-series Le Mystère du Lac on TF1 and the series Un Village français. In early 2017, her return was confirmed in Qu'est-ce qu'on a fait au bon dieu?

In June 2018, the actress has a role in the series Qu'est ce qu'on attend pour être heureux?.

From December 6, the series Papa ou maman launches with Émilie Caen in the lead role of the mom, alongside Florent Peyre as the dad.

On January 30, 2019, she reprises her role as Ségolène Verneuil, the central role in the film Qu'est-ce qu'on an encore fait au Bon Dieu?, the sequel to the 2014 hit Qu'est-ce qu'on a fait au Bon Dieu?. In this feature film, Ségolène wants to fly to China with her husband and children, where her art would be better understood thanks to a potential buyer discovered on the internet. To promote the film, the actress gave a number of interviews, including as a guest on Canal+'s La boîte à questions and France 5's C à Vous.

== Filmography ==
Year	Title	Role	Director	Notes
2004	Hautement populaire		Philippe Lubac	Short
2005	Josephine, Guardian Angel	Doctor	Laurent Lévy	TV series (1 episode)
2005	Inséparables	Nurse	Élisabeth Rappeneau	TV series (1 episode)
2006	Commissaire Cordier	Clara	Christophe Douchand	TV series (1 episode)
2007	Périphérique blues	Prostitute	Slony Sow	Short
2007	Made in Taiwan	Bride	Alexandre Mehring	Short
2007	Julie Lescaut	Karen	Daniel Janneau	TV series (1 episode)
2008	Rien dans les poches	Océane	Marion Vernoux	TV movie
2008	Scénarios contre les discriminations		Henri Liebman	TV series (1 episode)
2009	J'attendrai	Marie	Christelle Raynal	Short
2009	À la lune montante	Margot	Annarita Zambrano	Short
2009	Pour ma fille	Isabelle	Claire de la Rochefoucauld	TV movie
2010	Les Dames	Sabine Renoult	Charlotte Brandström	TV series (1 episode)
2010	Section de recherches	Sarah Gautier	Denis Amar	TV series (1 episode)
2010	Commissaire Magellan	Béatrice Nérac	Claire de la Rochefoucauld (2)	TV series (1 episode)
2011	The Intouchables	Gallerist	Éric Toledano and Olivier Nakache	
2011	L'art de séduire	Passerby	Guy Mazarguil	
2012	My Way	Geneviève Leroy	Florent Emilio Siri	
2012	La clinique de l'amour !	Cathy	Artus de Penguern & Gábor Rassov	
2012	L'homme de ses rêves	Jules's wife	Christophe Douchand (2)	TV movie
2012	Josephine, Guardian Angel	Caroline Meunier	Philippe Proteau	TV series (1 episode)
2013	Vive la France	Hostess	Michaël Youn	
2013	Bright Days Ahead	Hostess	Marion Vernoux (2)	
2013	Ogres niais	Madame Surdel	Bernard Blancan	Short
2013	Profilage	Karine Langlois	Marwen Abdallah	TV series (1 episode)
2013	Pep's	Nadine Pitou	Denis Thybaud	TV series (1 episode)
2014	Serial (Bad) Weddings	Ségolène Ling Verneuil	Philippe de Chauveron	
2014	24 Days	Captain Barsac	Alexandre Arcady	
2014	La loi	Marie-France Garaud	Christian Faure	TV movie
2014	Pilules bleues	Alexia	Jean-Philippe Amar	TV movie
2015	La fin du dragon	Marianne	Marina Diaby	Short
2015	Le mystère du lac	Valérie Fournont	Jérôme Cornuau	TV mini-series
2016	El Negro	Cécile	Yannick Privat	Short
2016	L'insecte		Elsa Blayau	Short
2016	Supermarket		Pierre Dugowson	Short
2016	Josephine, Guardian Angel	Zoé	Denis Thybaud (2)	TV series (1 episode)
2017	Swim		Pierre Dugowson (2)	
2017	Pour La Galerie	Gwennaelle Gerbert	Philippe Safir	Short
2017	Jusqu'à écoulement des stocks		Pierre Dugowson (3)	Short
2017	Candice Renoir	Nicole Ganay	Adeline Darraux	TV series (2 episodes)
2018	Serial (Bad) Weddings 2	Ségolène Ling Verneuil	Philippe de Chauveron (2)	
2021	Into the Night	Théa Bisset		TV series (season 2)
2022	Three Times Nothing (Trois fois rien)		Nadège Loiseau	
2022	Serial (Bad) Weddings 3	Ségolène Ling Verneuil	Philippe de Chauveron	
2022	Les Petits Meurtres d'Agatha Christie	Sylvia Denaux		TV series (1 episode)
