= Élie Semoun =

French comedian, actor, director, writer and singer (born 1963)

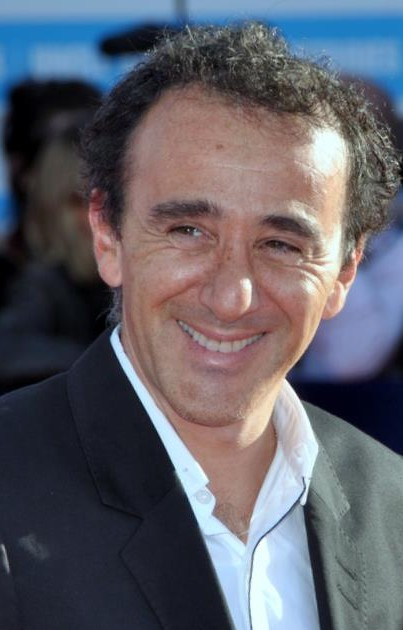
- Élie Semoun in 2012 at the Deauville American Film Festival
- Born: Élie Semhoun; 16 October 1963 (age 62); Paris, France
- Occupations: Comedian, actor, director, writer, singer
- Years active: 1988–present

Élie Semoun (born Élie Semhoun on 16 October 1963) is a French comedian, actor, director, writer and singer.

== Life and career ==
Élie Semoun was born in France, to a Sephardic Jewish family of Moroccan-Jewish and Algerian-Jewish descent. In 1980 at the age of 17, Semoun wrote two collections of poems and two plays ("Pièce d'identité" and "Pièce décousue"). He graduated from high school at the Lycée Descartes in Antony (Hauts-de-Seine) in 1982. Beginning in 1988, he had regular appearances on the television series Vivement lundi! on TF1, where he played a horse mounted on rollers.

His comedy career began in 1990 with his partner Dieudonné, with whom he wrote and performed daring skits with scathing takes on generally taboo subjects such as racism and poverty, often playing up contrasts between himself and his partner in terms of origin, color, and religion.

Their first show was held at Café de la Gare in 1991. The duo acquired a certain notoriety in 1992 after several appearances on their fellow comedian Arthur's show Emission Impossible, where they were noticed for their particularly corrosive sketches. They followed this up with one success after another at Le Splendid Theater, Paris's Palais des glaces, and at Casino de Paris. Élie and Dieudonné formed one of the most popular comic duos of the 1990s.

In 1997 the duo split due to artistic and financial differences. Élie resented how Dieudonné handled their relations with the media and admitted that he was unhappy that his friend had turned towards film (and that he left to appear in the United States) and antisemitism. Dieudonné managed the financial aspects of their career, and Semoun felt their money was not divided equitably.

Breaking out on his own, Semoun continued his success with Petites Annonces d'Élie (which had at first been intended to be a show with Dieudonné) alongside his friend the actor Franck Dubosc. Once again his performance was promoted by his friend on the show Les Enfants de la télé (France) Inspired by actual classified ads recorded by them in a van, the "Petites Annonces d'Élie" (Élie's Classified Ads) are seen through the character of Cyprian, a repulsive-looking man searching for a "busty blond".

Semoun went back on stage with a one-man show, Élie and Semoun. He supported Bertrand Delanoë during Paris's municipal elections of 2001 and Lionel Jospin during the presidential election of 2002. In 2003, he released an album of French songs called simply "Chansons". In early 2005, he performed in a show (co-authored with Franck Dubosc and Muriel Robin) entitled Élie Semoun se prend pour qui?

In the years following his separation with Dieudonné, Élie Semoun maintained a complex and strained relationship with his former partner. First strained, then reconciled, they have again grown apart during the public controversy aroused by the political stances of Dieudonné. "Some have speculated on the reunion of our duo, but I must tell you that this is clearly out of the question! It's over." In 2012, he declared that "the Dieudonné he knew and the Dieudonné of today appear to him like two completely different people, and he is unable to reconcile them in his mind".

An album entitled Sur le fil (On the Edge) was released on 19 March 2007. He brought in new guest stars, such as Alexandre Astier and Bérénice Bejo. The skits are always written by Élie Semoun and Franck Dubosc, but this time assisted by comedian Manu Payet.

Élie performed his show Élie Semoun se prend pour qui? for the last time on 16 June 2007 in Doué-la-Fontaine at the Festival d'Anjou.

In 2007, he signed a petition disagreeing with Ségolène Royal and participated in several meetings against the Socialist candidate with his friend Bertrand Delanoë.

== Family ==
His father, Paul Semhoun, is from the Moroccan city of Taza, and worked for the French Postal Service. His mother, Denise Malka, born in Tlemcen in Algeria, was a French teacher. She died of hepatitis at age 36 when Élie was 11 years old. He has a younger brother, Laurent, who died of AIDS in 2002, also age 36, and a sister, Anne-Judith, a marketing director.

He has a son, Antoine, born in 1995 in Rennes. He shares custody with his ex-wife, Annie Florence Jeannesson, whom he divorced in 2002.

Semoun is the second cousin of singer and actor Patrick Bruel, the grandfather of Bruel being the brother of Semoun's grandmother.

According to Paris Match, the actor has been in a relationship with Aude Fraineau, a worker in audiovisual production who is thirty years younger than him (born in 1990), since 2023. In 2025 he announced on the Quotidien show that she would give birth soon.

== Shows ==
- 1991: Élie Semoun et Dieudonné au Théâtre du Splendid Saint-Martin, directed by Pascal Légitimus
- 1996: Élie Semoun et Dieudonné en garde à vue
- 1999: Élie et Semoun au Palais des Glaces, directed by Muriel Robin
- 2002: Élie Semoun à l'Olympia, directed by Roger Louret
- 2005–2006: Élie Semoun se prend pour qui ?, directed by Roger Louret
- 2008–2009: Merki…, directed by Roger Louret
- 2012: Tranches de Vies, directed by Muriel Robin

== Theater ==
- 2012: Tartarin de Tarascon by Jérôme Savary, directed by the author, Théâtre André Malraux
- 2012: Inconnu à cette adresse by Kressmann Taylor, directed by Delphine de Malherbe, théâtre Antoine-Simone Berriau
- 2014: Le Placard by Francis Veber, directed by the author, Théâtre des Nouveautés

== Filmography ==
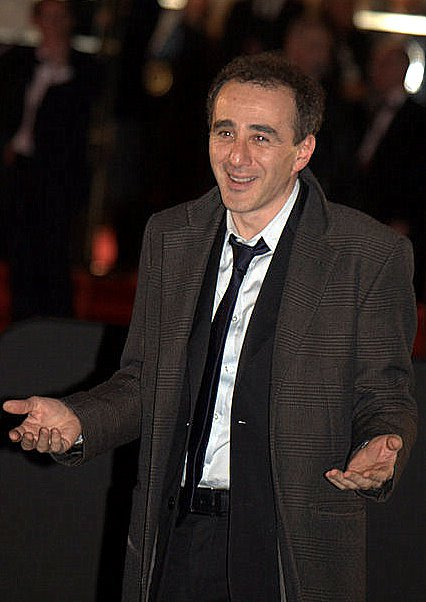
Élie Semoun at the 36th César Awards in 2011.

=== Television ===
- 1989: Pause-café Pause Tendresse de Serge Leroy (3rd episode): Alberto
- 1988–1991: Vivement lundi!
- 1990: Édouard et ses filles by Michel Lang
- 1996: François Kleber – L'Embrouilleur
- 1996: Maigret – Maigret tend un piège
- 2001–2003: Caméra Café (at least 3 episodes)
- 2002: Si j'étais lui by Philippe Triboit
- 2004: Kaamelott (5 episodes) : the Witch Hunter
- 2008: Rien dans les poches by Marion Vernoux
- 2010: Un divorce de chien by Lorraine Lévy : Julien
- 2011: Very Bad Blagues de Palmashow (épisode 58)
- 2012: Bref by Kyan Khojandi (episode 53) :the classified ads seller
- 2013: Hitchcock by Mocky – episode "Selon la loi"
- 2013: Nos chers voisins fêtent l'été : Ludovic, un représentant de commerce, victime de la ruse des voisins
- 2013: Y'a pas d'âge (1 episode)
- 2013: What Ze Teuf (2 episodes) : Himself

=== Film ===
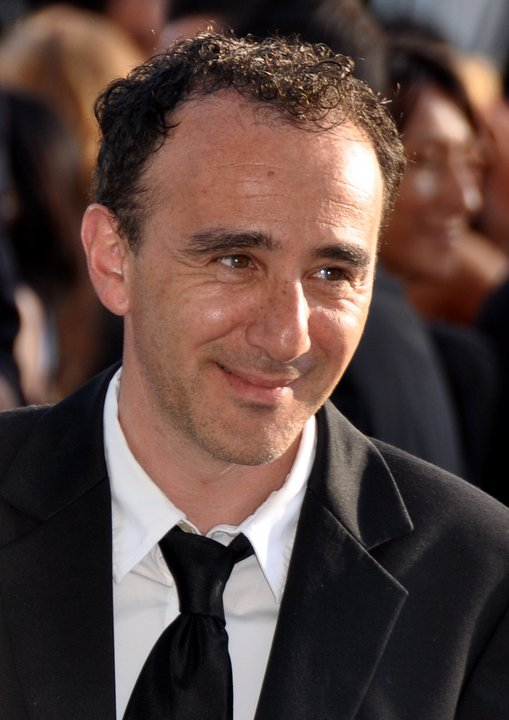
Élie Semoun at the 2011 Cannes Film Festival.

- 1988: Toilette-Zone by Laurence Arcadias
- 1995: Les Trois Frères by Bernard Campan and Didier Bourdon : Brice
- 1995: Les Bidochon by Serge Korber : René
- 1996: Titus et Cortex by Jean Claude Buziac
- 1996: Tout doit disparaître by Philippe Muyl: Gérard Piche
- 1997: Les Démons de Jésus by Bernie Bonvoisin: Gérard
- 1997: Le Clone by Fabio Conversi: Thomas
- 1997: Que la lumière soit by Arthur Joffé: God the shopkeeper
- 1998: Charité biz'ness by Thierry Barthes: Momo/Massipu
- 1998: Les Grandes Bouches by Bernie Bonvoisin: Fichier
- 1999: L'Ami du jardin by Jean-Louis Bouchaud
- 1999: Les Parasites by Philippe de Chauveron: Brigadier Max Schmitt
- 1999: Love Me by Laetitia Masson: l'amoureux
- 1999: Stringer by Klaus Biedermann: Filo
- 2000: Old School by Karim Abbou and Kader Ayd: Dealer
- 2000: Deuxième vie by Patrick Braoudé: Steve Michaud
- 2002: Si j'étais lui by Philippe Triboit: Tristan
- 2003: The Car Keys by Laurent Baffie: Himself
- 2004: People by Fabien Onteniente: Cyril Legall
- 2004: Casablanca Driver by Maurice Barthélemy: Mr. X
- 2004: Les Dalton by Philippe Haim: Docteur Doxey / Customs Officer
- 2004: La vie de Michel Muller est plus belle que la vôtre by Michel Muller
- 2005: Iznogoud by Patrick Braoudé: Prince
- 2005: Once Upon a Time in the Oued by Djamel Bensalah: Maitre d'hôtel
- 2005: Riviera by Anne Villacèque: Romansky
- 2005: Aux abois by Philippe Collin: Paul
- 2008: Asterix at the Olympic Games by Frédéric Forestier and Thomas Langmann : Judge Omega
- 2008: 15 ans et demi by Thomas Sorriaux and François Desagnat: Angry Automobilist
- 2009: Cyprien by David Charhon: Cyprien
- 2009: Park Benches by Bruno Podalydès: Le dragueur
- 2009: Neuilly sa mère ! by Gabriel Julien-Laferrière: Court Bailiff
- 2010: La Chance de ma vie by Nicolas Cuche: Philippe Markus
- 2011: L'Élève Ducobu by Philippe de Chauveron: Gustave Latouche
- 2012: Les Vacances de Ducobu by Philippe de Chauveron: Gustave Latouche
- 2012: Les Kaïra by Franck Gastambide: lui-même
- 2014: Les Trois Frères : le retour by Didier Bourdon and Bernard Campan: Mr Gérard
- 2014: Les Francis by Fabrice Begotti: Prefect
- 2014: Qu'est-ce qu'on a fait au Bon Dieu? by Philippe de Chauveron
- 2014: La Grande séduction by Stéphane Meunier
- 2018: Neuilly sa mère, sa mère ! by Gabriel Julien-Laferrière
- 2020: Ducobu 3: Gustave Latouche
- 2022: Ducobu Président!: Gustave Latouche

Short films

- 1985: Poussière d'étoiles by Agnès Merlet
- 2000: Le Truc by Stéphane Bélaïsch
- 2007: Dominique Laffin, portrait d'une enfant pas sage, by Laurent Perrin
- 2012: L'âge de Glace 4: Élie Semoun visite Blue Sky; (document shown Sunday 24 juin 2012 by Gulli).
- 2014: Les Trois Frères, le retour

== Voice Work ==
=== Film ===
==== Animated films ====
- 1995: Pocahontas: French voice of Wiggins
- 2002: The Magic Roundabout directed by Dave Borthwick: voice of Zébulon
- 2002: Ice Age directed by Chris Wedge: French voice of Sid
- 2002: Gouille et Gar by Gamer (short film): voice of Gouille
- 2005: Robots of Chris Wedge: French voice of Fender
- 2006: Ice Age: The Meltdown directed by Carlos Saldanha: French voice of Sid
- 2006: Charlotte's Web directed by Gary Winick: French voice of Rat Templeton
- 2009: Ice Age: Dawn of the Dinosaurs: French voice of Sid
- 2010: A Turtle's Tale: Sammy's Adventures: French voice of adult Ray
- 2010: Allez raconte ! directed by Jean-Christophe Roger: Éric
- 2011: Animals United: French voice of Billy the Meerkat
- 2011: Émilie Jolie directed by Francis Nielsen and Philippe Chatel: voices of Belzébuth and Prince Charming
- 2012: Ice Age: Continental Drift : French voice of Sid
- 2012: Sammy's Great Escape directed by Ben Stassen : French voice of adult Ray
- 2014: The Mansions of the Gods directed by Alexandre Astier : voice of Ubiquitus
- 2016: Ice Age: Collision Course: French voice of Sid

=== Television ===
==== Series ====
- 1988: Les Années collège : Joey Jeremiah (Pat Mastroianni)

=== Shows with Dieudonné ===
- 1991–1993: Élie et Dieudonné
- 1993: L'avis des bêtes - Une certaine idée de la France
- 1996: Élie et Dieudonné en garde à vue

=== Shows with Franck Dubosc ===
- Les Petites Annonces d'Élie
- Élie Annonce Semoun 2000
- Élie Annonce Semoun : la suite de La suite

=== Video ===
- 1999: Élie et Semoun au Palais des Glaces
- 2000: Élie annonce Semoun, 5th volume of short ads (55 classified ads)
- 2002: Les Petites Annonces d'Élie l'intégrale, the first 3 volumes released on VHS in the late 1990s and the unprecedented volume 4 (the best of the first 3) (167 classified ads)
- 2002 : Élie Semoun à l'Olympia Bruno Coquatrix
- 2003 : Élie annonce Semoun, la suite, 6th volume of classified ads
- 2006 : Élie Semoun se prend pour qui ?
- 2007 : Élie annonce Semoun, la suite de la suite, 7th volume of classified ads (56 classified ads)
- 2008 : Merki
- 2008 : Les Petites Annonces d'Élie (l'essentiel){Avec Franck Dubosc}(more than160 classified ads)
- 2012 : Tranches de vies

=== Video games ===
- 1998 : Dreamcast (voiceover promotional advertising Sega console "Up to six billion players")
- 2003 : Rayman 3: Hoodlum Havoc (Les Ptizêtres, additional voices)

== Albums ==
- 2003 : Chansons
- 2007 : Sur le fil

== Books ==
- Les Annonces en BD, bande dessinée, Jungle :
  - Tome I, Si tu es blonde…, 2004.
  - Tome II, J'suis choooquée, 2005.
  - Best of 2009.
- Élie Semoun se prend pour qui ?, graphic novel, Jungle, 2006.
- Kévina, Mikeline, Toufik et les autres…, Fetjaine, 2008.
- Je grandirai plus tard, Flammarion, 2013.
