= Medi Sadoun =

French actor (born 1973)

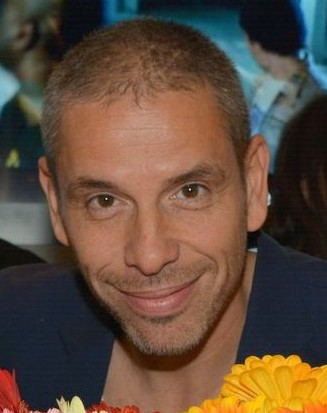
- Sadoun in 2016
- Born: 8 July 1973 (age 53); Paris, France
- Occupation: Actor

Medi Sadoun (French: [medi sadun]; born 8 July 1973) is a French actor born in Paris. He is known for playing the role of Rachid Benassem in Serial (Bad) Weddings.

== Filmography ==
=== Feature films ===
Year	Title	Role	Director	Notes
2010	Bacon on the Side	A Swiss	Anne Depétrini	
2011	De force	The Wholesaler	Frank Henry	
2011	De l'huile sur le feu	A Supporter	Nicolas Benamou	
2012	Porn in the Hood	Abdelkrim	Franck Gastambide	
2014	Serial (Bad) Weddings	Rachid Benassem	Philippe de Chauveron	
2014	Mea Culpa	Jacquet	Fred Cavayé	
2014	Les Francis	Mehdi	Fabrice Begotti	
2016	Joséphine, Pregnant & Fabulous	Marc	Marilou Berry	
2016	La Dream Team	Maxime Belloc	Thomas Sorriaux	
2016	Débarquement immédiat	Karzaoui	Philippe de Chauveron	
2017	Alibi.com	Garcia	Philippe Lacheau	
2017	Baby Phone	Ben	Olivier Casas	
2017	La Deuxième Étoile	Gabin	Lucien Jean-Baptiste	
2018	Nicky Larson et le Parfum de Cupidona	the lie detector inspector (cameo appearance)	Philippe Lacheau	
2019	Qu'est-ce qu'on a encore fait au Bon Dieu ?	Rachid Benassem	Philippe de Chauveron	Sequel of Serial (Bad) Weddings
2019	Chamboultout	JP	Éric Lavaine	
2019	Made in China	Bruno	Julien Abraham	

=== Television ===
Year	Title	Role	Director	Notes
2009-2011	Kaïra Shopping	Abdelkrim	Franck Gastambide	TV mini-series
2012	Le Golden Show	Roman Kaïra	François Descraques	TV series (1 episode)
2013	Le Débarquement			Entertainment show with sketches
2018	Scènes de ménages : Aventures sous les tropiques	The pilot of a plane that will drop Emma and Fabien in the Amazon rainforest		Special evening
