= Serial (Bad) Weddings =

- French theatrical release poster
- French: Qu'est-ce qu'on a fait au Bon Dieu?
- Directed by: Philippe de Chauveron
- Written by: Philippe de Chauveron; Guy Laurent
- Produced by: Romain Rojtman
- Starring: Christian Clavier; Chantal Lauby; Ary Abittan; Frédéric Chau; Frédérique Bel; Élodie Fontan
- Cinematography: Vincent Mathias
- Edited by: Sandro Lavezzi
- Music by: Marc Chouarain
- Production company: Les films du 24
- Distributed by: UGC Distribution
- Release date: 16 April 2014 (France)
- Running time: 97 minutes
- Country: France
- Language: French
- Budget: €12.8 million ($17.5 million)
- Box office: $176.4 million

Serial (Bad) Weddings (French: Qu'est-ce qu'on a fait au Bon Dieu?, lit. 'What have we done to the Good Lord?') is a 2014 French comedy film directed by Philippe de Chauveron, and starring Christian Clavier and Chantal Lauby.

It is the first installment in the Serial (Bad) Weddings film series, and was followed by Serial (Bad) Weddings 2 in 2019, and by Serial (Bad) Weddings 3 in 2022.

== Plot ==
Claude Verneuil, a Gaullist notary, and his wife Marie, a Catholic bourgeois couple from Chinon, are parents of four daughters: Isabelle, Odile, Ségolène, and Laure. The three eldest are already married to men, each one of a different religion and a different ethnic origin: Isabelle married Rashid Ben Assem, an Algerian Muslim lawyer, Odile married David Benichou, a Sephardi Jew entrepreneur, and Ségolène married Chao Ling, a Han Chinese atheist banker. The Verneuils pretend to accept their sons-in-law but have had a hard time hiding their discomfort at accepting people into the family from outside the community. A family meeting is spoiled because of the awkwardness and clichés about race and religion, expressed as much by the father as by the sons-in-law, who even exchange insulting views to and about each other.

The Verneuils, in despair, put all their hope in their youngest daughter Laure, that she will bring home a Catholic partner, going so far as to arrange an "accidental" meeting with Xavier, a young Catholic man who works in finance. However, Laure reveals that she had already chosen a partner named "Charles", a Catholic, and wishes to marry him. Laure's parents are overjoyed and readily forgive his occupation as a comedian and actor. On the first meeting, however, they are shocked when they discover that the man to whom their daughter is engaged is a black West African from the Ivory Coast. Claude begins to sink into depression and spends his time cutting down trees and fishing. Meanwhile, the three sons-in-law get together and plan to stop Laure's marriage out of fear that their barely stable friendship dynamics will be threatened by a fourth member.

When the Verneuils meet with the Kofis, Marie and Charles' mother Madeleine get along well, but Claude finds that Charles' father André is an intolerant, tough, stingy military man and extremely resentful of the former white colonisation and white nationalism in Africa. Both the groom's and bride's party come head to head and the fathers' disapproval and racist views heat up the situation. On the day before the wedding, André and Claude go fishing and unexpectedly find common ground in their dislikes, as both are Gaullists (Charles de Gaulle), and develop a friendship. After catching a large pike, the two go to a restaurant, get drunk with wine and are arrested at a pâtisserie after making racist comments. Laure is notably upset at this and boards a train, deciding to abandon the marriage; André and Claude catch the train and persuade Laure to marry Charles. Laure agrees and the film ends with a happy marriage and a night of the family dancing coupé-décalé.

== Cast ==
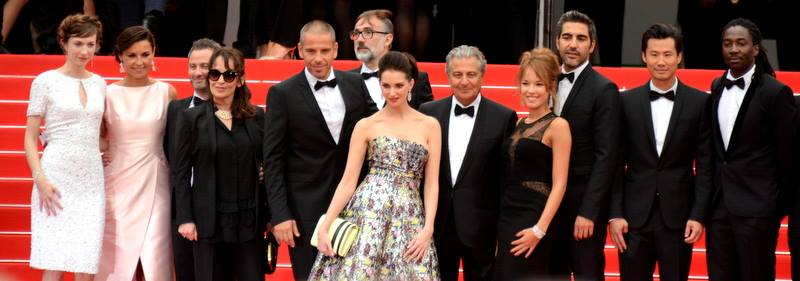
Cast members at the Cannes in 2014

- Christian Clavier as Claude Verneuil
- Chantal Lauby as Marie Verneuil
- Medi Sadoun as Rashid Ben Assem
- Ary Abittan as David Benichou
- Frédéric Chau as Chao Ling
- Noom Diawara as Charles Kofi
- Pascal N'Zonzi as André Kofi, Father of Charles
- Salimata Kamate as Madeleine Kofi, Mother of Charles
- Tatiana Rojo as Viviane Kofi, Sister of Charles
- Frédérique Bel as Isabelle Ben Assem Verneuil
- Julia Piaton as Odile Benichou Verneuil
- Émilie Caen as Ségolène Ling Verneuil
- Élodie Fontan as Laure Verneuil
- Élie Semoun as the Psychologist
- Loïc Legendre as the Priest of Chinon
- David Salles as a gendarme
- Axel Boute as the young "albino" person in cell

== Production ==
Although set in Chinon, the film was mainly filmed in Paris and in Normandy. A few shots of the castle in Chinon were taken on 10 December 2013.

== Reception ==
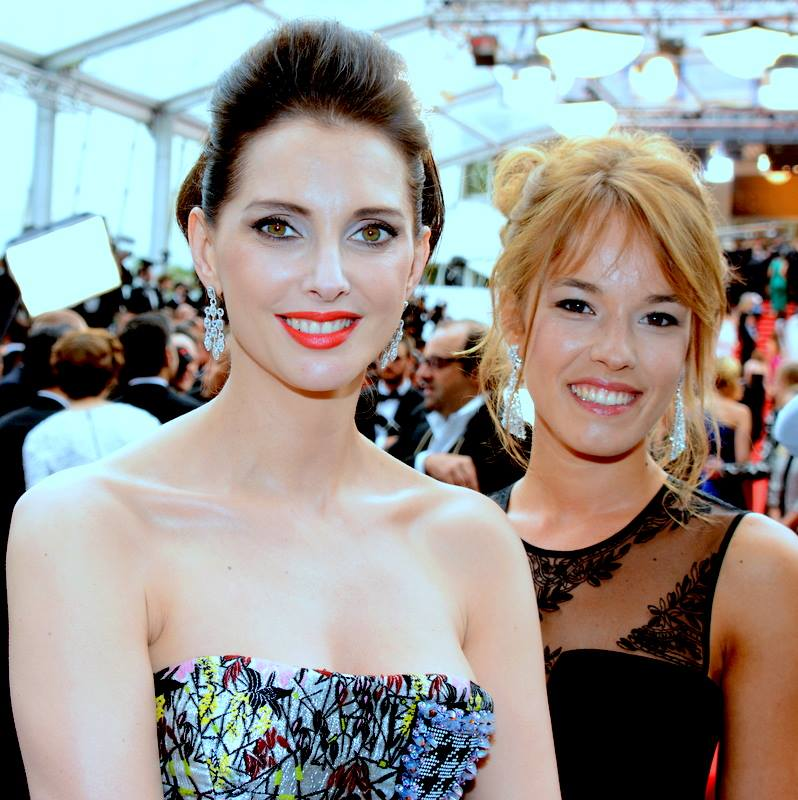
Frédérique Bel and Élodie Fontan at the 2014 Cannes Film Festival.

=== Critical response ===
In France, the film received positive reviews with an average grade of 4.2/5 from AlloCiné from over 9,200 votes on May 30, 2014 as well as press critics giving the film an average grade of 3.7/5 from 7 reviews. Le Figaro called it a "triumph," "a phenomenon" and "hilarious."

However, reviews in the English-speaking world were less positive; the movie received mixed reviews in the UK and was panned in the US. The National Post stated that the film's humor failed because "it sometimes strays across the good-taste divide and into actual racist remarks, played straight. Secondly (and far more importantly in a comedy) it often isn’t funny at all." Variety magazine adds that the film has been criticized for "perpetuating racist stereotypes and feeding into France's ambient xenophobia." According to The Hollywood Reporter, "the majority of the jokes are extremely heavy-handed – the Jew calls the Arab 'Arafat' and then is karate-chopped by the Asian."

Because of the film's controversial content, it had little global distribution. The Telegraph reported that, "British and American cinema-goers will not get to see a hugely popular French comedy because it has been rejected by film distributors who deem it politically incorrect and possibly racist."

=== Box office ===
The film attracted over 200,000 viewers in 621 cinemas on the first day. The film received the "Label des spectateurs UGC" two months before its release. Other French successes such as The Intouchables and The Artist have also received this award. The film grossed a total of US$174.1 million internationally. In France, the film had 13.2 million admissions, making it a large commercial success.

Country	Viewers
France	12,353,181
Germany	3,769,180
Spain	1,056,000
Switzerland	494,542
Belgium	420,000
Austria	393,000
Italy	356,425
South Korea	190,384
Canada	152,000
Greece	126,000
Poland	100,000
TOTAL (world)	19,804,298

=== In other media ===
One of the tracks from the film "Fatima" is one of the tracks in Just Dance 2015.

== Remakes ==
This film was unofficially remade in Malayalam as Happy Sardar in 2019.

== Sequel ==
In February 2017 a sequel was confirmed for a release in France on 30 January 2019. The story was set to be about Claude and Marie scheming to make their sons-in-law stay in France. The sequel titled Serial (Bad) Weddings 2 was released in 2019 and is about the Catholic Verneuil family and their four daughters, three who have married men of different faiths and one who married a black man.

== Accolades ==
Award / Film Festival	Category	Recipients and nominees	Result
28th European Film Awards	European Film Academy People's Choice Award for Best European Film	Serial (Bad) Weddings	Nominated
29th Goya Awards	Best European Film	Serial (Bad) Weddings	Nominated
20th Lumière Awards	Best Screenplay	Philippe de Chauveron and Guy Laurent	Won

== See also ==
- Lists of highest-grossing films in France
