= Ary Abittan =

French actor and humorist (born 1974)

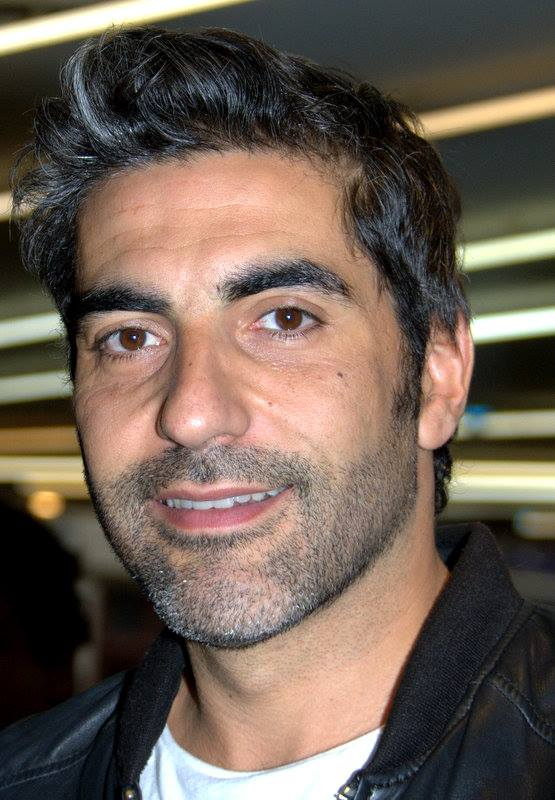
- Ary Abittan in 2014
- Born: Paris, France
- Occupations: Actor, humorist

Ary Abittan (French: [aʁi abitɑ̃]) is a French actor and humorist. He is particularly known for his role in Serial (Bad) Weddings.

== Life and career ==
Ary Abittan was born on January 31, 1974, in Paris. He comes from a Sephardic Jewish (Maghrebi Jewish) family. His father is from Morocco and his mother from Tunisia. He spent part of his childhood between Garges-lès-Gonesse and Sarcelles. At age 19, he became a taxi driver, like his father, an activity that allowed him to finance his first theater lessons.

In 1993, Ary Abittan wrote (in parallel of theater lessons) his first sketches and then performed on stage since 1994 In 2007, he took the lead role in a play, Happy Hanukah, which Jean-Luc Moreau directed. The same year, he plays the main role during three seasons of Nos années pension, broadcast on France 2.

In 2012, he plays in Dépression et des potes of Arnaud Lemort. The same year, he made his first participation in Marrakech du rire. In 2014, he plays in Serial (Bad) Weddings with Christian Clavier and Chantal Lauby by Philippe de Chauveron.

== Filmography ==
=== Feature films ===
Year	Title	Role	Director	Notes
2008	Tu peux garder un secret ?	David	Alexandre Arcady	
2009	Coco	Max	Gad Elmaleh	
2009	Tellement proches	Moshé Benhamou	Éric Toledano & Olivier Nakache	
2010	La Fête des voisins	François-Xavier	David Haddad	
2010	Tout ce qui brille	Lila's father	Géraldine Nakache & Hervé Mimran	
2010	Fatal	David Fontana	Michaël Youn	
2011	De l'huile sur le feu	Pizzeria Server	Nicolas Benamou	
2012	Dépression et des potes	Romain	Arnaud Lemort	
2013	Vive la France	Jafaraz Ouèchemagül	Michaël Youn	
2013	Chimpanzee	French Voice-over	Mark Linfield & Alastair Fothergill	
2013	Hôtel Normandy	Yvan Carlotti	Charles Nemes	
2013	La Grande Boucle	Tony Agnelo	Laurent Tuel	
2014	Serial (Bad) Weddings	David Benichou	Philippe de Chauveron	
2015	Robin des bois, la véritable histoire	Little John	Anthony Marciano	
2016	The Visitors: Bastille Day	Lorenzo Baldini, marquis de Portofino	Jean-Marie Poiré	
2016	Débarquement immédiat	José Fernandez	Philippe de Chauveron	
2017	With Open Arms	Babik	Philippe de Chauveron	
2017	Coco	Héctor	Lee Unkrich	French voice
2017	I Feel Better	Edouard	Jean-Pierre Améris	
2018	Under the Eiffel Tower	Frederic	Archie Borders	
2019	Serial (Bad) Weddings 2	David Benichou	Philippe de Chauveron	

=== Television ===
Year	Title	Role	Director	Notes
1999	Sur la vie d'ma mère		Yves Azeroual & Philippe Layani	TV series - Episode 4
2008	Inéluctable	Kudlip Badwar	François Luciani	TV movie
2008	Manhunt	The Mossad agent	Laurent Jaoui	TV movie
2008-2010	Nos années pension	Alexandre « Bobor » Ganielle	Cristina Arellano & Sylvie Coquart	TV series -Season 2 to 4
2013	Scènes de ménages	Emma's trader cousin	Alain Kappauf	Guest
2014	L'Esprit de famille	Yvan Perez	Frédéric Berthe	TV movie
