= With Open Arms =

2017 film

- Directed by: Philippe de Chauveron; Manoel de Oliveira
- Starring: Christian Clavier; Ary Abittan
- Release date: 5 April 2017
- Running time: 92 min
- Countries: France; Belgium; Portugal
- Languages: French; English; Portuguese

With Open Arms (French: À bras ouverts) is a 2017 French-Belgian comedy film directed by Philippe de Chauveron. The film received mixed to negative reviews from critics.

== Cast ==
- Christian Clavier - Jean-Étienne Fougerole
- Ary Abittan - Babik
- Elsa Zylberstein - Daphné Fougerole
- Cyril Lecomte - Erwan Berruto
- Nanou Garcia - Isabelle Cheroy
