= Dieudonné (comedian) =

French comedian, actor, and political activist (born 1966)

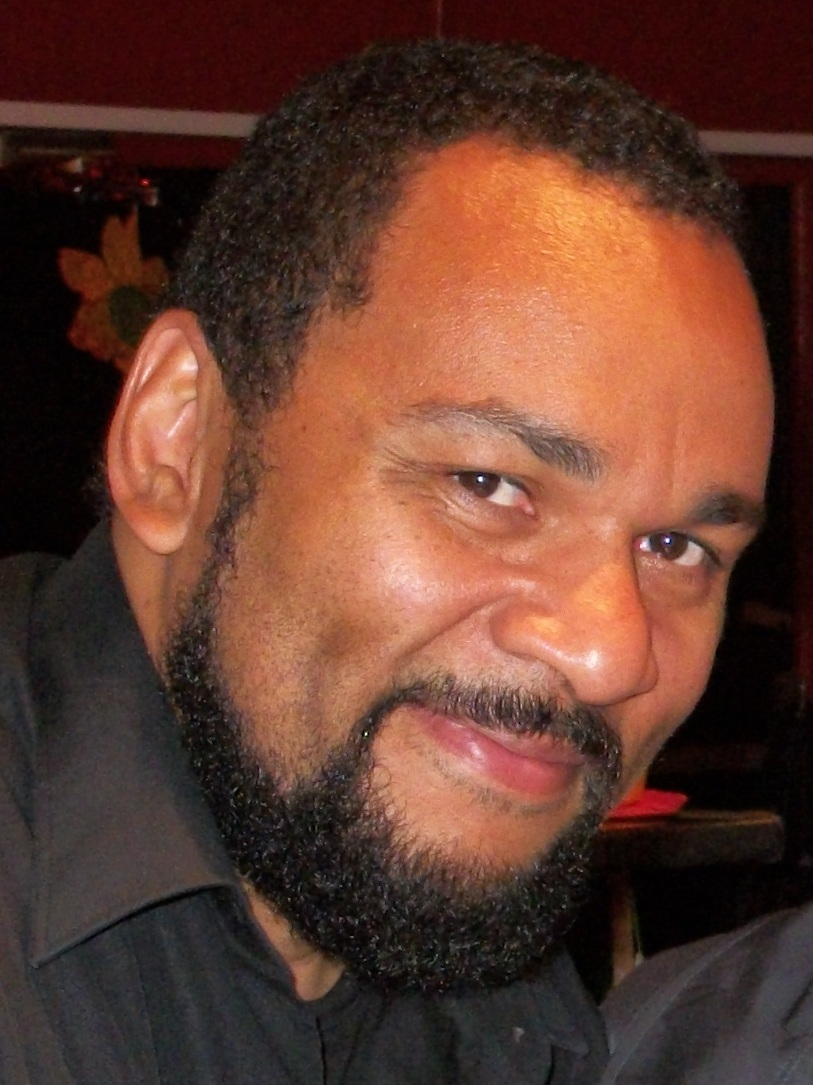
- Dieudonné in 2009
- Born: Dieudonné M'bala M'bala; 11 February 1966 (age 60); Paris, France
- Other name: Dieudo
- Occupations: Comedian; actor; political activist
- Spouse: Noémie Montagne
- Children: 5
- Website: www.dieudosphere.com

Dieudonné M'bala M'bala (French pronunciation: [djødɔne ɛmbala ɛmbala]; born 11 February 1966), known mononymously as Dieudonné and popularly as Dieudo ([djødo]), is a French comedian, actor, and political activist.

He has been convicted for hate speech, advocating terrorism, Holocaust denial, and slander in France, Belgium and Switzerland.

Dieudonné initially achieved success working with Jewish comedian Élie Semoun, humorously exploiting racial stereotypes. He was a candidate in the 1997 and 2001 legislative elections in Champagny-en-Vanoise against the National Front. In 2003, Dieudonné performed a sketch on a TV show about an Israeli settler whom he depicted as a Nazi. Several organizations sued him for incitement to racial hatred. Dieudonné refused to apologize and denounced Zionism.

In 2007, Dieudonné approached Jean-Marie Le Pen, leader of the National Front that he had fought earlier, and the men became political allies and friends. Holocaust denier Robert Faurisson appeared in one of his shows in 2008. Dieudonné described Holocaust remembrance as "memorial pornography". He subsequently found himself regularly banned from mainstream media, and many of his shows were cancelled by local authorities. Active on the internet and in his Paris theater, Dieudonné has continued to have a following. His quenelle signature gesture became notorious in 2013, particularly after footballer Nicolas Anelka used it during a match in December 2013.

In 2013, after Dieudonné was recorded during a performance mocking a Jewish journalist, suggesting it was a pity that he was not sent to the gas chambers, Minister of Interior Manuel Valls stated that Dieudonné was "no longer a comedian" but was rather an "anti-Semite and racist" and that he would seek to ban all Dieudonné's public gatherings as a public safety risk. His shows have been banned in several French cities. On 20 January 2017, the court of appeal of Liège confirmed a first instance sentence of two months of jail time and a €9,000 fine for Dieudonné's antisemitic remarks in a performance in Herstal on 14 March 2012.

Dieudonné has also been known to associate with Mahmoud Ahmadinejad, President of Iran from 2005 to 2013, who has himself been accused of describing the Holocaust as a myth. On 25 February 2015, Ahmadinejad tweeted, "Visiting an old friend, a great artist." The tweet included photographs of himself and Dieudonné, arms around each other, smiling. The two also met in 2009 during a visit by Dieudonné to Iran where they reportedly discussed their shared anti-Zionist views.

== Personal life ==
Dieudonné M'bala M'bala was born in Fontenay-aux-Roses, France. He is the son of a retired sociologist from Brittany, who is also a painter and exhibits under the name Josiane Grué, and an accountant from Ekoudendi, Cameroon. His parents divorced when he was one year old, and he was brought up by his mother. He attended Catholic school, though his mother was a New Age Buddhist. From 2006 to 2020, Dieudonné was in a relationship with Noémie Montagne, his producer, and has five children with her. After their separation, Montagne accused Dieudonné of psychological abuse and filed a complaint against him.

== Performing career ==
Dieudonné began writing and practicing routines with his childhood friend, Jewish comedian and actor Élie Semoun. They formed a comedic duo, Élie et Dieudonné (Élie and Dieudonné), and performed in local cafés and bars while Dieudonné worked as a salesman, selling cars, telephones, and photocopy machines. In 1992, a Paris comedian spotted them and helped them stage their first professional show. In the 1990s, they appeared on stage and on television together as "Élie et Dieudonné". In 1997 they split and each went on to a solo theater career. In 1998, they reunited in a screen comedy, Le Clone, which was a failure critically and financially. From the mid-1990s Dieudonné appeared in several French film comedies, primarily in supporting roles. His most successful screen appearance to date was in Alain Chabat's box-office hit Asterix & Obelix: Mission Cleopatra in 2002; in 2004 he appeared in Maurice Barthélemy's box office bomb Casablanca Driver.

Dieudonné's successful one-man shows include Pardon Judas (2000), Le divorce de Patrick (2003), and 1905 (2005). Other one-man shows were Mes Excuses (2004), Dépôt de bilan (2006) and J'ai fait l'con (2008), all understood as attacks on political and social opponents and defences of his own positions. Antisemitic statements made within and around these productions led to intense controversy and numerous lawsuits. Following the 2005 civil unrest in France, Dieudonné also penned a play called Émeutes en banlieue (Riots in the Suburbs, February 2006). In 2009, surrounded by scandals (see below, "Political activities"), Dieudonné launched two one-man shows: Liberté d’expression (Freedom of expression) and Sandrine. While the latter was a follow-up to Le divorce de Patrick, the former was conceived as a series of itinerant "conferences" on "free speech". Started on 18 June 2010 in his theater, Dieudonné's most recent show to date, Mahmoud (standing for Mahmoud Ahmadinejad) has an openly antisemitic tone, caricaturing Jews, slavery and "official" versions of history.

Dieudonné's production company first acted under the name Bonnie Productions and now under the name Les productions de la Plume.

In 2012, Dieudonné made his directorial debut in a film called L'Antisémite (The Anti-Semite), in which he starred as a violent and alcoholic character who dresses as a Nazi officer at a party, and also features the Holocaust denier Robert Faurisson, as well as imagery that mocked Auschwitz concentration camp prisoners. The movie, which was produced by the Iranian Documentary and Experimental Film Center, is also known by the title "Yahod Setiz". Its scheduled screening at the Cannes Film Festival's Marché du Film (the parallel film market event) was canceled. The film released exclusively on VOD for subscribers to Dieudonné's website.

== Théâtre de la Main d'Or ==
Dieudonné is the lease holder of the Théâtre de la Main d'Or in the 11th arrondissement of Paris, which is used for both stand-up comedy and political events by himself and friends.

== Political activities and views ==
=== The quenelle gesture ===
The quenelle, invented by Dieudonné, is a gesture consisting of a downward straight arm touched at the shoulder by the opposite hand. In French, quenelle normally refers to a type of dumpling. Images of the quenelle were widely shared in 2013, with many individuals posing while performing the quenelle in photos posted to the internet. Dieudonné claims that the gesture is an anti-establishment protest. The gesture has also been described as a reverse Nazi salute. Officially, French authorities have said the gesture is too vague to take any action against Dieudonné. In December 2013, the French Minister for Sport Valérie Fourneyron publicly criticised the footballer Nicolas Anelka for using the gesture as a goal celebration in an English Premier League match. French international and NBA basketball player Tony Parker also came under fire during the same time period for his use of the gesture. On 30 December 2013, Parker apologized for making the gesture, saying that the photograph had been taken three years earlier and that he had been unaware at the time that it had any antisemitic connotation.

On 31 December 2013, Dieudonné released a 15-minute video proposing that "2014 will be the year of the quenelle!". In it, Dieudonné attacks "bankers" and "slavers", so as not to say "Jews" and end up in a lawsuit, and calls upon his followers, "quenelleurs"—those who listen and follow him—towards a hatred of Jews. "Antisemite? I'm not of that opinion," he says in the video. "I'm not saying I'd never be one. ... I leave myself open to that possibility, but for the moment, no." Later, he added, "I don't have to choose between the Jews and the Nazis."

An official January 2014 circular issued by Interior Minister Manuel Valls besides laying out a legal justification for banning antisemitic performances by Dieudonné also specifically linked the quenelle gesture to antisemitism and extremism.

=== Beginnings ===
Dieudonné was initially active on the anti-racist left. In the 1997 French legislative election, he worked with his party, "Les Utopistes", in Dreux against National Front candidate Marie-France Stirbois and received 8 percent of the vote. Verbally and in demonstrations, he also supported migrants without a residence permit (the so-called "sans papiers") and the Palestinians.

=== 2002–2006 ===
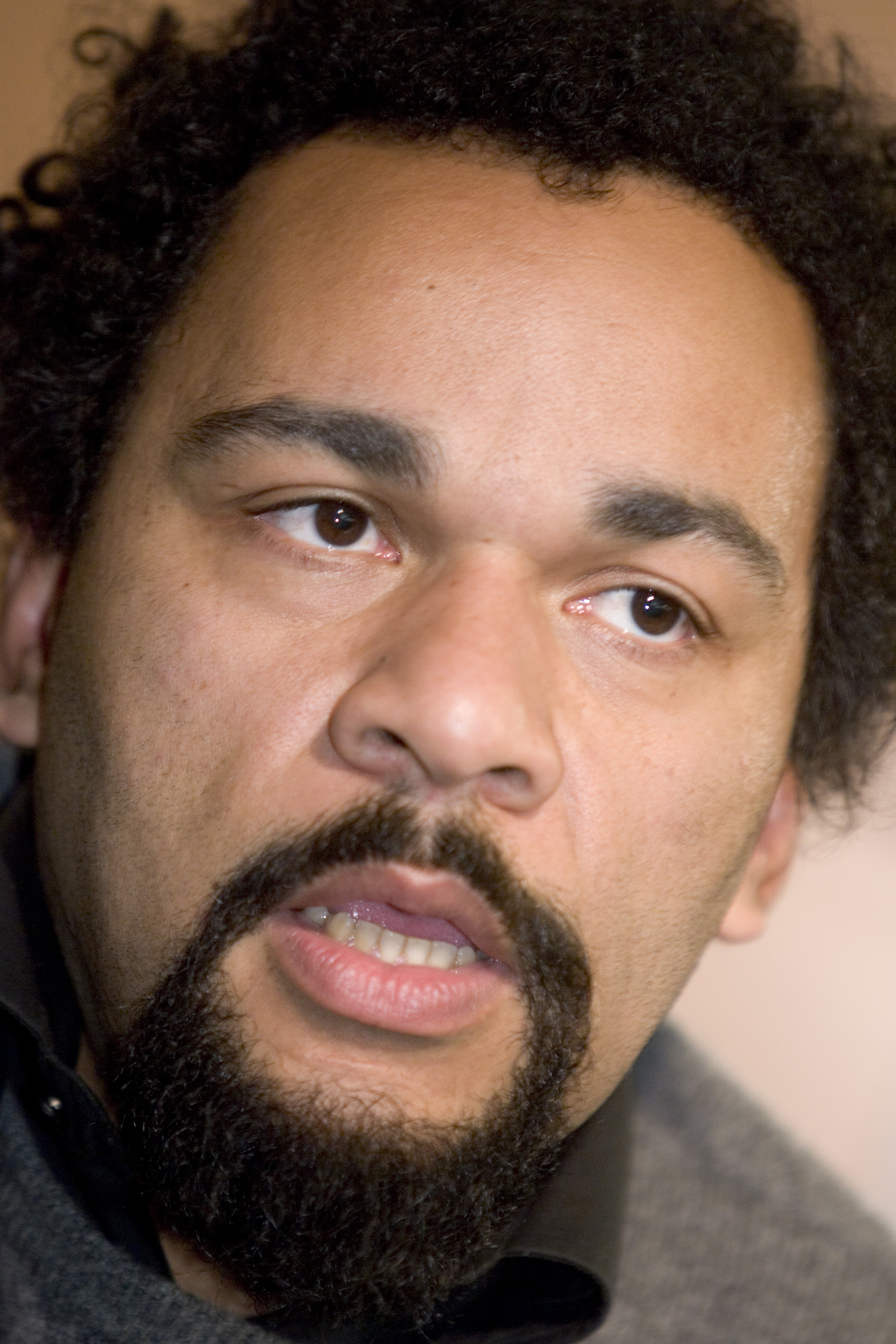
Dieudonné in 2006

Since 2002, Dieudonné has attracted attention by making increasingly polemical statements. In an interview for the magazine Lyon Capitale in January 2002, he described "the Jews" as "a sect, a fraud, which is the worst of all, because it was the first" and said he preferred "the charisma of bin Laden to that of Bush". He subsequently tried to run for president in the 2002 presidential election, but failed to get in the race.

On 1 December 2003, he appeared live on a television show disguised as a parody of an Israeli settler wearing military fatigues and a Haredi (Orthodox) Jewish hat. The sketch climaxed with a Hitler salute, after which Dieudonné shouts out a word. According to Dieudonné, he shouted "Israël" in the persona of the Haredi. In the following days, some news agencies stated that he shouted "Isra – Heil" or "Heil Israel". He was cleared of charges of antisemitism in a Paris court after the judge said this was not an attack against Jews in general but against a type of person "distinguished by their political views". At the 2004 European Parliament election, Dieudonné was a candidate for the extreme left-wing party "Euro-Palestine", but left a few months after the election due to disagreement with its leaders.

Dieudonné is the director of Les Ogres website, where he makes plain his denial of the historical version of the 9/11 events. Following this television appearance, a Dieudonné show in Lyon (at La Bourse du Travail) on 5 February 2004 was picketed and a bottle containing a corrosive product was thrown in the venue, injuring a spectator. On 11 November, Dieudonné organized a debate with four rabbis of Naturei Karta in the Théâtre de la Main d'Or in Paris.

On 16 February 2005, he declared during a press conference in Algiers that the Central Council of French Jews CRIF (Conseil Représentatif des Institutions juives de France) was a "mafia" that had "total control over French policy exercise", called the commemoration of the Holocaust "memorial pornography" ("pornographie mémorielle"), and claimed that the "Zionists of the Centre national de la cinématographie," which "control French cinema" prevented him from making a film about the slave trade. Dieudonné was also trying to appear as a spokesman for French blacks, but, after some initial sympathy, from the novelist Calixthe Beyala, the journalists Antoine Garnier and Claudy Siar, as well as the founding members of the Conseil représentatif des associations noires (CRAN), he increasingly met with their rejection.

Throughout 2005 and 2006, Dieudonné was often in the company of senior National Front members Bruno Gollnisch, Frédéric Chatillon, and Marc George (also known as Marc Robert), the man who went on to conduct his electoral campaigns in 2007 and 2009. Dieudonné also frequently appeared together with the conspiracy theorist Thierry Meyssan and the former Marxist and current right-wing radical Alain Soral, a confidant of Marine and Jean-Marie Le Pen. Under the influence of Soral's writings and polemics, Dieudonné was acquainted with his militant antisemitism of French nationalist inspiration. In May 2006, he gave a lengthy interview to the far-right monthly Le Choc du mois. Demonstrating shoulder to shoulder with Islamists, he also traveled at the end of August 2006 with Châtillon, Meyssan and Soral to Lebanon, to meet MPs and fighters of the Hezbollah. Some Jews reacted angrily to his comments on this tour. In April 2005, Dieudonné went to Auschwitz. In May 2006 he was involved in a fight with two teenage Jews in Paris, one of whom he sprayed with tear gas. Dieudonné claimed that the teenagers attacked him first; both parties pressed charges, but the lawsuits were not pursued. In France and abroad, Dieudonné became increasingly perceived as an extremist of a type until then uncommon in Europe: in the introduction to a March 2006 interview, The Sunday Independent of South Africa called him a "French Louis Farrakhan... obsessed with Jews".

=== 2007–2009 ===
Dieudonné wanted to finally represent politically these ever-radicalized positions in the 2007 presidential election, but for logistical reasons he could not maintain his candidacy, which was organized by Marc Robert (a.k.a. Marc George). The convicted Holocaust denier Serge Thion wrote for his campaign web site under the pseudonym "Serge Noith", as did also the longtime secretary of the Holocaust denier Roger Garaudy, Maria Poumier. After the end of his candidacy, Dieudonné appeared several times publicly in the company of Jean-Marie Le Pen and traveled to Cameroon with Le Pen's wife Jany. However, officially, Dieudonné called for the election of anti-globalization militant José Bové, despite Bové's asking Dieudonné not to do so.

In July 2008, Jean-Marie Le Pen became godfather to Dieudonné's third child. Philippe Laguérie, a traditionalist Catholic priest, officiated at the baptism, which was held in the Saint-Éloi congregation in Bordeaux.

On 26 December 2008, at an event at the Parc de la Villette in Paris, Dieudonné awarded the Holocaust denier Robert Faurisson an "insolent outcast" prize [prix de l'infréquentabilité et de l'insolence]. The award was presented by one of Dieudonné's assistants, Jacky, dressed in a concentration camp uniform with a yellow badge. This caused a scandal and earned him his sixth court conviction. On 29 January 2009, he celebrated the 80th birthday of Faurisson in his theater, in the midst of a representative gathering of Holocaust deniers, right-wing radicals, and radical Shiites. Dieudonné and Faurisson further appeared together in a video making fun of the Holocaust and its commemoration. During the following years, Dieudonné and Alain Soral kept associating with Faurisson, and helped popularize Holocaust denial among a new, younger audience.

On 21 March 2009, Dieudonné announced that he would run for the 2009 European Parliament election in the Île-de-France at the head of an "anti-Zionist", list, in partnership with the Anti-Zionist Party, a group connected to the Shiite Centre Zahra. Other candidates on his party's electoral list included Alain Soral and former Green Party member and known Holocaust denier Ginette Skandrani (also known as Ginette Hess), and Yahia Gouasmi, chairman of the Centre Zahra and the Anti-Zionist Party. The list was supported by Fernand Le Rachinel, a former high-ranking executive of the National Front and official printer of the party. In early May 2009, the French government studied the possibility of banning the Anti-Zionist list's meetings but on 24 May, Justice minister Rachida Dati found there was no legal ground to do so. The Parti antisioniste ultimately received 1.30% of the votes.

=== 2010–2012 ===
On 9 May 2012, police in Brussels, Belgium, stopped Dieudonné mid-performance after determining that his performance contravened local laws, and forced the cancellation of two more shows, but in November 2013, a judge in Brussels found that the comedian was not using antisemitic slurs or inciting racial hatred during the show that was interrupted in May 2012. On 21 June, Dieudonné complained against the Brussels police. On 12 May 2012, event producer Evenko forced the cancellation of Dieudonné's shows in Montreal, Quebec, Canada, on 14, 15, 16, and 17 May, citing "contractual conflicts". In late May 2012, a screening of Dieudonné's directorial debut, L'Antisémite (The Antisemite), was canceled at the Marché du Film, the market held at the Cannes Film Festival.

=== 2013 ===
Dieudonné released a song and dance called "Shoananas", performed to the tune of the 1985 children's video and song by Annie Cordy "Cho Ka Ka O" (Chaud Cacao or Hot Cocoa in English), which itself by today's standards might be considered racist. The term "Shoananas" is a portmanteau of Shoah, the French and Hebrew word used to refer to the Holocaust, and ananas, the French word for pineapple.

In December, while performing onstage, Dieudonné was recorded saying about prominent French Jewish radio journalist Patrick Cohen: "Me, you see, when I hear Patrick Cohen speak, I think to myself: ‘Gas chambers ... too bad.’"

Radio France, Cohen’s employer, announced on 20 December that it had alerted authorities that Dieudonné had engaged in "openly anti-Semitic speech", and various French anti-racism watchdog groups filed complaints.

French Interior Minister Manuel Valls announced he would try to legally ban public performances by Dieudonné. Valls stated that Dieudonne was "no longer a comedian" but was rather an "anti-Semite and racist" who had run afoul of France's laws against incitement to racial hatred.

"Despite a conviction for public defamation, hate speech and racial discrimination, Dieudonné M’Bala M’Bala no longer seems to recognize any limits," Valls wrote.

"Consequently, the interior minister has decided to thoroughly examine all legal options that would allow a ban on Dieudonné’s public gatherings, which no longer belong to the artistic domain, but rather amount to a public safety risk."

=== 2014 ===
On 6 January, France's interior minister Manuel Valls said that performances considered antisemitic may be banned by local officials. In support of this, Valls sent a three-page memo to all prefects of police in France on 6 January entitled, "The Struggle Against Racism and Antisemitism—demonstrations and public reaction—performances by Mr. Dieudonné M’Bala M’Bala". With respect to freedom of speech in France and banning scheduled performances ahead of time, Valls wrote: "The struggle against racism and antisemitism is an essential concern of government and demands vigorous action." He takes note of the liberty of expression in France, but goes on to say that in exceptional circumstances, the police are invested with the power to prohibit an event if its intent is to prevent "a grave disturbance of public order" and cites the 1933 law supporting this.

Within hours, Bordeaux became the first French city to ban Dieudonné when mayor Alain Juppé canceled a local appearance planned as part of a scheduled national tour, followed closely by Nantes, Tours, Orléans, Toulouse, Limoges, and Biarritz. The show in Switzerland was to go on as scheduled. On 10 January the Paris Prefect of Police prohibited Dieudonné from staging his next three upcoming shows at his Paris theatre.

Some officials from both sides of the political spectrum have reservations about the legal validity of the Valls circular, and believe that cancellations could leave their cities liable for judgments of millions of euros in damages to Dieudonné if he sues and wins, as actually occurred in La Rochelle in 2012.

According to a poll by IFOP for Metronews taken on 8–9 January 2014, 71% of the French population had a negative image of Dieudonné while 16% held a positive view. The voters of the National Front were the least negative, with 54% seeing him negatively and 32% positively.

On 11 January 2014, he announced he would not perform his show Le Mur but would replace it with another one, Asus Zoa, that he wrote in three nights and that would talk about "dance and music inspired by ancestral myths". In February, Dieudonné was banned from entry into the United Kingdom.

In September, French authorities opened an investigation into Dieudonné on grounds that he condoned terrorism after mocking and showing footage of the killing of U.S. journalist James Foley. He described it as "access to civilisation", comparing it to many colonial crimes in Africa, which included killing and dismembering of victims and which were for decades justified by "civilizing Africa".

=== 2015 ===
On 10 January 2015, following the Charlie Hebdo shooting, the Porte de Vincennes siege of a kosher supermarket, and the 1,500,000-strong "march against hatred" in Paris, Dieudonné wrote on Facebook "As far as I am concerned, I feel I am Charlie Coulibaly." In this way he mixed the popular slogan "Je suis Charlie", used to support the journalists killed at the Charlie Hebdo magazine, with a reference to Amedy Coulibaly who was responsible for the hostage-taking at the kosher supermarket which included the killing of four Jews.

Likening his treatment to that of "Public Enemy No. 1," on 11 January Dieudonné complained about it in an open letter to the Minister of the Interior, Bernard Cazeneuve.

On 13 January, Dieudonné was arrested in Paris, accused of publicly supporting terrorism, based on his earlier Facebook comments where he appeared to support the kosher supermarket gunman Amedy Coulibaly.

=== 2016 ===
According to the Canadian Broadcasting Corporation's report by Benjamin Shingler dated 11 May 2016, Dieudonné M'bala M'bala was refused entry at the Montréal–Pierre Elliott Trudeau International Airport by Canada Border Services Agency on the grounds of prior criminal convictions and forced to return home. He had been scheduled to perform ten shows in Montreal starting Wednesday night, 11 May 2016.

=== 2020 ===
In 2020, Dieudonné was banned from YouTube, Facebook, Instagram and TikTok.

=== 2024 ===
Dieudonné was an independent candidate in Guadeloupe's 1st constituency in the 2024 French legislative election. He won 241 votes (1.03%), placing eighth in a field of 11 candidates, and did not advance to the second round.

== Legal issues ==
- On 14 June 2006, Dieudonné was sentenced to a penalty of €4,500 for defamation after having called a prominent Jewish television presenter a "secret donor of the child-murdering Israeli army".
- On 15 November 2007, an appellate court sentenced him to a €5,000 fine because he had characterized "the Jews" as "slave traders" after being attacked in le Théâtre de la Main d'Or.
- On 26 June 2008, he was sentenced in the highest judicial instance to a €7,000 fine for his characterization of Holocaust commemorations as "memorial pornography".
- On 27 February 2009, he was ordered to pay CAD$75,000 in Montreal to singer and actor Patrick Bruel for defamatory statements. He had called Bruel a "liar" and an "Israeli soldier".
- On 26 March 2009, Dieudonné was fined €1,000 and ordered to pay €2,000 in damages for having defamed Elisabeth Schemla, a Jewish journalist who ran the now-defunct Proche-Orient.info website. He declared on 31 May 2005 that the website wanted to "eradicate Dieudonné from the audiovisual landscape" and had said of him that "he's an anti-Semite, he's the son of Hitler, he will exterminate everyone".
- On 27 October 2009, he was sentenced to a fine of €10,000 for "public insult of people of Jewish faith or origin" related to his show with Robert Faurisson. Dieudonné appealed to the European Court of Human Rights, which rejected his case on 10 November 2015.
- On 8 June 2010, he was sentenced to a fine of €10,000 for defamation towards the International League against Racism and Anti-Semitism, which he had called "a mafia-like association that organizes censorship".
- On 7 January 2014, he was fined €887,135 for tax evasion. According to the French revenue service, Dieudonné failed to pay part of his taxes from 1997 to 2009.
- On 12 February 2014, he was ordered by a court to withdraw two clips from a video posted on YouTube on 31 December 2013 on the grounds of incitement to ethnic or racial hatred, and denial of crimes against humanity.
- On 25 November 2015, a court in Liège, Belgium, sentenced him to two months in jail and a €9,000 fine for "defamatory, antisemitic, negationist and revisionist" talk during a show in Herstal on 14 March 2012.
- On 14 April 2016, the Court of Appeal of Paris upheld a 19 March 2015 conviction of inciting racial hatred.
- In July 2021 he stood trial in Switzerland for Holocaust denial during shows in Geneva and Nyon in 2019. He denied the charges, but was found guilty and fined.

== Publications ==
- Lettres d'insulte, illustrations by Tignous, Le Cherche-midi, 2002 ISBN 2862747971
- Peut-on tout dire?, Interviews conducted by Philippe Gavi, Robert Ménard and Emmanuelle Ménard, in parallel with Bruno Gaccio, Editions Mordicus, 2010 ISBN 978-2-918414-00-1
- Yacht People 1: Quenelle en haute mer (comics, with Alain Soral, art by Zéon), Kontre Kulture, 2012 ISBN 978-2367250076
- Yacht People 2: Au-dessus, c'est le soleil (comics, with Alain Soral, art by Zéon), Kontre Kulture, 2014 ISBN 978-2367250489
- Réponse à Eric Zemmour, self-published, 2021 ASIN B09K84V4T1

== Bibliography ==
Books

- Anne-Sophie Mercier, La vérité sur Dieudonné, Plon, 2005; reissued in 2009 as Dieudonné démasqué, Seuil ISBN 978-2021005646
- Olivier Mukuna, Dieudonné. Entretien à cœur ouvert, Éditions EPO, 2004 ISBN 978-2872622177
- Jean-Paul Gautier, Michel Briganti, André Déchot La galaxie Dieudonné: Pour en finir avec les impostures, Syllepse, 2011 ISBN 978-2849502853

Articles

- Jürg Altwegg, Die große Show der Auschwitz-Lügner als Duett eines Komikers mit dem Geschichtsfälscher Robert Faurisson, Frankfurter Allgemeine Zeitung 6 January 2009, p. 36
- Agathe André, Mon réveillon chez les Faurissons. Charlie Hebdo n° 864, 7 January 2009, p. 2
