= Pascal N'Zonzi =

French actor

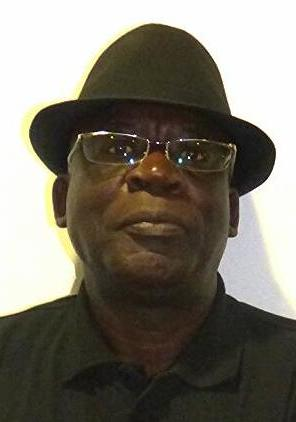
- N'Zonzi in 2016
- Born: 1 January 1951 (age 75); Republic of the Congo, Central Africa
- Occupations: Actor, stage director
- Years active: 1970–present
- Children: 4

Pascal N'Zonzi (born 1 January 1951) is a French actor and stage director.

== Filmography ==
Year	Title	Role	Director	Notes
1970	The Seven Headed Lion		Glauber Rocha	
1981	The Professional	Arthur	Georges Lautner	
1981	L'appât du gain		Jules Takam	
1983	Banzaï	Police chief	Claude Zidi	
1986	Black Mic Mac		Thomas Gilou	
1987	Elle et lui	The man	François Margolin	Short
1988	Ya bon les blancs	The storyteller	Marco Ferreri	
1989	Mama, There's a Man in Your Bed	Douta	Coline Serreau	
1990	Le Gorille	Jérôme	Roger Hanin	TV series (1 episode)
1991	Night on Earth	Passenger	Jim Jarmusch	
1992	Quelque part vers Conakry	Madiou's uncle	Françoise Ebrard	
1993	Mensonge	Passenger	François Margolin (2)	
1993	Antoine Rives, juge du terrorisme	Ndinga	Philippe Lefebvre	TV series (1 episode)
1995	The Three Brothers	The recruiter	Didier Bourdon & Bernard Campan	
1996	Le damier	Himself	Balufu Bakupa-Kanyinda	Short
1997	P.J.	Loum	Gérard Vergez	TV series (2 episodes)
1998	Une voix en or	Moussa	Michelle Allen & Patrick Volson	TV mini-series
2000	Lumumba	Moise Tshombe	Raoul Peck	
2000	Oncle Paul	The marabout	Gérard Vergez (2)	TV movie
2001	Fatou la Malienne	Kebe	Daniel Vigne	TV movie
2002	Carnage	The cow man	Delphine Gleize	
2002	P.J.	Oyabi	Gérard Vergez (3)	TV series (1 episode)
2003	Paris selon Moussa	Zanga	Cheik Doukouré	
2003	Fatou, l'espoir	Kebe	Daniel Vigne (2)	TV movie
2004	Une autre vie	Amadou Babakar	Luc Béraud	TV movie
2004	L'oiseau Do	N'Gomélé	Henri Heidsieck	TV movie
2005	Kirikou and the Wild Beasts	The old man	Michel Ocelot & Bénédicte Galup	
2005	P.J.	Gilbert	Gérard Vergez (4)	TV series (1 episode)
2006	Les enfants du pays	Baye Dame	Pierre Javaux	
2006	L'État de Grace	Taxi Driver	Pascal Chaumeil	TV mini-series
2007	Reporters	Lucien Mamba	Gilles Bannier	TV series (1 episode)
2007	Les prédateurs	Omar Bongo	Lucas Belvaux	TV series (2 episodes)
2008	Behind the Walls	Oudie	Christian Faure	
2009	Quand la ville mord		Dominique Cabrera	TV movie
2010	Le sentiment de la chair	Djibril	Roberto Garzelli	
2010	Clandestin	Mohamed	Arnaud Bedouët	TV movie
2011	The Rabbi's Cat	The first giant	Joann Sfar & Antoine Delesvaux	
2011	Les dessous de la corruption	Dossey	Sylvestre Amoussou	
2011	Mister BOB	Moise Tshombe	Thomas Vincent	TV movie
2012	Paulette	Father Baptiste	Jérôme Enrico	
2012	Kirikou and the Men and Women	The old man	Michel Ocelot (2)	
2013	Aya of Yop City	Bonaventure Sissoko	Marguerite Abouet & Clément Oubrerie	
2013	3 Femmes en colère	Pierre	Christian Faure (2)	TV movie
2014	Serial (Bad) Weddings	André Koffi	Philippe de Chauveron	
2014	Le Crocodile du Botswanga	The Minister for firms	Lionel Steketee & Fabrice Eboué	
2015	Adama	Abdou	Simon Rouby	
2016	The Visitors: Bastille Day	Philibert	Jean-Marie Poiré	

== Theater ==
Year	Title	Author	Director	Notes
1985	Je soussigné cardiaque	Sony Lab'ou Tansi	Gabriel Garran	Théâtre national de Chaillot
1986	Qu'est devenu Ignoumba le chasseur ?	Sylvain Bemba	Sylvain Bemba	Festival d'Avignon
1988	Le Bal de N'Dinga	Tchicaya U Tam'si	Gabriel Garran (2)	Théâtre national de Chaillot
1995	La Dispute	Pierre de Marivaux	Dominique Pitoiset	Théâtre National de Bretagne
1996	La Tragédie du roi Christophe	Aimé Césaire	Jacques Nichet	Tour
1998	Tout bas... si bas	Koulsy Lamko	Paul Golub	Festival des francophonies en Limousin
2001	The Blacks	Jean Genet	Alain Ollivier	Nouveau théâtre d'Angers
2002	Elle est là	Nathalie Sarraute	Michel Raskine	Théâtre de la Ville
2002	C'est beau	Nathalie Sarraute	Michel Raskine (2)	Théâtre de la Ville
2010	Le Bal de N'Dinga	Tchicaya U Tam'si	Pascal Nzonzi	Maison de la Poésie

== Dubbing ==
Year	Title	Role	Actor	Director
1992	Malcolm X	Baines	Albert Hall	Spike Lee
1993	Cool Runnings	Derice Bannock	Leon Robinson	Jon Turteltaub
2008	Blindness	Man with Black Eye Patch	Danny Glover	Fernando Meirelles
2012	Django Unchained	Stephen	Samuel L. Jackson	Quentin Tarantino
