= Medellin (film) =

2023 Franco-Colombian action comedy film

- Directed by: Franck Gastambide
- Written by: Franck Gastambide; Charles Van Tieghem
- Produced by: Eric Altmayer; Nicolas Altmayer
- Starring: Franck Gastambide; Ramzy Bedia; Anouar Toubali; Brahim Bouhlel; Essined Aponte; Raymond Cruz
- Distributed by: Amazon Prime Video
- Release date: 2 June 2023
- Running time: 104 minutes
- Countries: France; Colombia
- Language: French

Medellin is a 2023 action-comedy movie directed by Franck Gastambide, written by Gastambide and Charles Van Tieghem, and starring Gastambide, Ramzy Bedia, Anouar Toubali, and Mike Tyson.

== Plot ==
Reda is a French wannabe tough guy who manages a boxing gym. When his brother Brahim, a social media influencer, fan of narcoculture, and even more so of Pablo Escobar, who calls himself Pablito, is kidnapped by cartel members during a trip to Colombia, Reda unexpectedly jumps into action, gathering his gym members and making them pledge to accompany him to Medellin to rescue his younger brother.

However, at the airport, only his childhood buddy Stan and Chafix, a dwarf who trains at the gym, show up. The three unlikely heroes land in Medellin and head to a strip club, where they meet and question Cynthia, a pole dancer. She speaks a little French and suspiciously tries to get them to go somewhere else. They end up snorting cocaine before going on a full-night drug-fueled party with strippers. When they wake up with horrible headaches, they realize that they somehow ended up kidnapping Don Nacho, the son of El Diablo, the cartel leader.

Reda posts a video online, where he asks for his brother in exchange for Don Nacho. Soon after, his phone rings: it is his brother. Brahim sounds panicked as he explains he had actually staged his kidnapping in an ill-conceived stunt to drive up viewership and that he is really enjoying a vacation in another city in Colombia. Realizing that they are holding Don Nacho for no reason, the trio decide to pick up Brahim and flee. Alas, the cartel is already on their tracks and while Reda, Stan, and Chafix (with Don Nacho in the trunk of the car) barely escape after a car chase and shoot-out, Brahim is kidnapped (for real this time) by the cartel.

Now, a real hostage exchange needs to take place. During a video call, El Diablo shows Brahim being mauled by one of his attack dogs, while Reda and his friends are on a boat and have dropped Don Nacho in the sea as shark bait. El Diablo agrees to the exchange, but as Don Nacho tries to swim back to the boat, his legs are snapped off by a shark. Unless quickly taken care off, he will die. The three companions bring Don Nacho to a local vet, who treats his wounds, but Don Nacho has lost too much blood. Both Reda and Stan find excuses not to help with a transfusion but Chafix, a universal donor, generously offers his blood, at the risk of his own life. The transfusion complete, they set off to a Medellin cemetery to complete the trade.

To fool the cartel, the trio hide Don Nacho's shortened limbs under a blanket and try to escape with Brahim before El Diablo realizes the subterfuge. But Don Nacho manages to open the door of the car, revealing his infirmity, making El Diablo furious. The cartel boss orders his men to shoot Reda and his friends.

Leaving Brahim to his fate, the three barely escape the goons after a long run through the slums of Medellin, with the help of Cynthia. She reveals herself to be an undercover police officer named Marissa who is trying to take down the cartel. However, as she tries to get police cover for the trio's escape, she finds out that the entire force is corrupt. Driving towards the Venezuelan border, they receive a new video showing El Diablo torturing Brahim. Reda decides that unless they go back and rescue his brother and somehow stop the cartel, they will always live in fear.

Marissa takes them to Robbie, an American military operative who quickly trains Reda and Stan in the use of firearms while devising a way for Chafix to help find Brahim's location. With a concealed GPS tracker, Chafix provokes the cartel in a bar, is knocked out by a chair, and taken to the same location as Brahim and locked in a cage.

Thanks to the tracker, Robbie dispatches Reda and Stan to a cocaine manufacturing facility, where the pair finds Brahim and manages to escape, only to realize they forgot Chafix. After some hesitation, they go back and, thanks to Robbie's training, make quick work of a large number of goons.

They meet Marissa in a hacienda outside the city, which Brahim recognizes as a property of Pablo Escobar. While moving around inside the house, Brahim finds a secret passage leading to a helicopter. As they plan their way out, Marissa asks Reda to help her get rid of the cartel. They devise a plan to rig the house with explosives and bait the cartel into the trap. El Diablo and his goons soon arrive, guns blazing. While Stan learns to fly the helicopter using online videos, Reda, holed up in one of the bedrooms, realizes that the steel-reinforced walls will block the remote signal for the bomb and instead decides to sacrifice himself, taking the whole cartel with him. In the end, he is celebrated in France as a hero.

== Cast ==
- Franck Gastambide as Stan
- Ramzy Bedia as Reda
- Anouar Toubali as Chafix
- Brahim Bouhlel as Brahim
- Essined Aponte as Marissa
- Raymond Cruz as El Diablo
- Mike Tyson as Robbie
- Ariel Sierra as Don Nacho
- Bernardo Garcia as the Vet
- Vincent Bersoulle as El Colosso

== Critical reception ==
Romey Norton of Ready Steady Cut described Medellin as an overall adequate action film, packed with dark humor and exciting action sequences with decent acting from a well-known cast.

Archika Khurana of The Times of India found the movie entertaining and funny for the most part but noted that the script was inconsistent and failed to take a deep dive into the narrative.

John Serba of Decider gave the movie a SKIP IT rating, citing a lack of rhythm between the script and the well-executed but unremarkable action.
