= Élie and Dieudonné =

French comedic duo

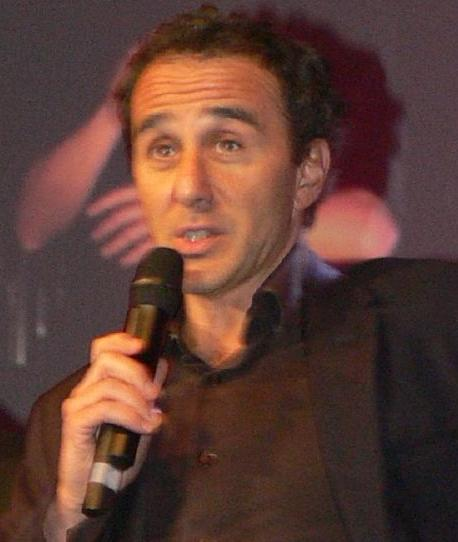
Élie Semoun

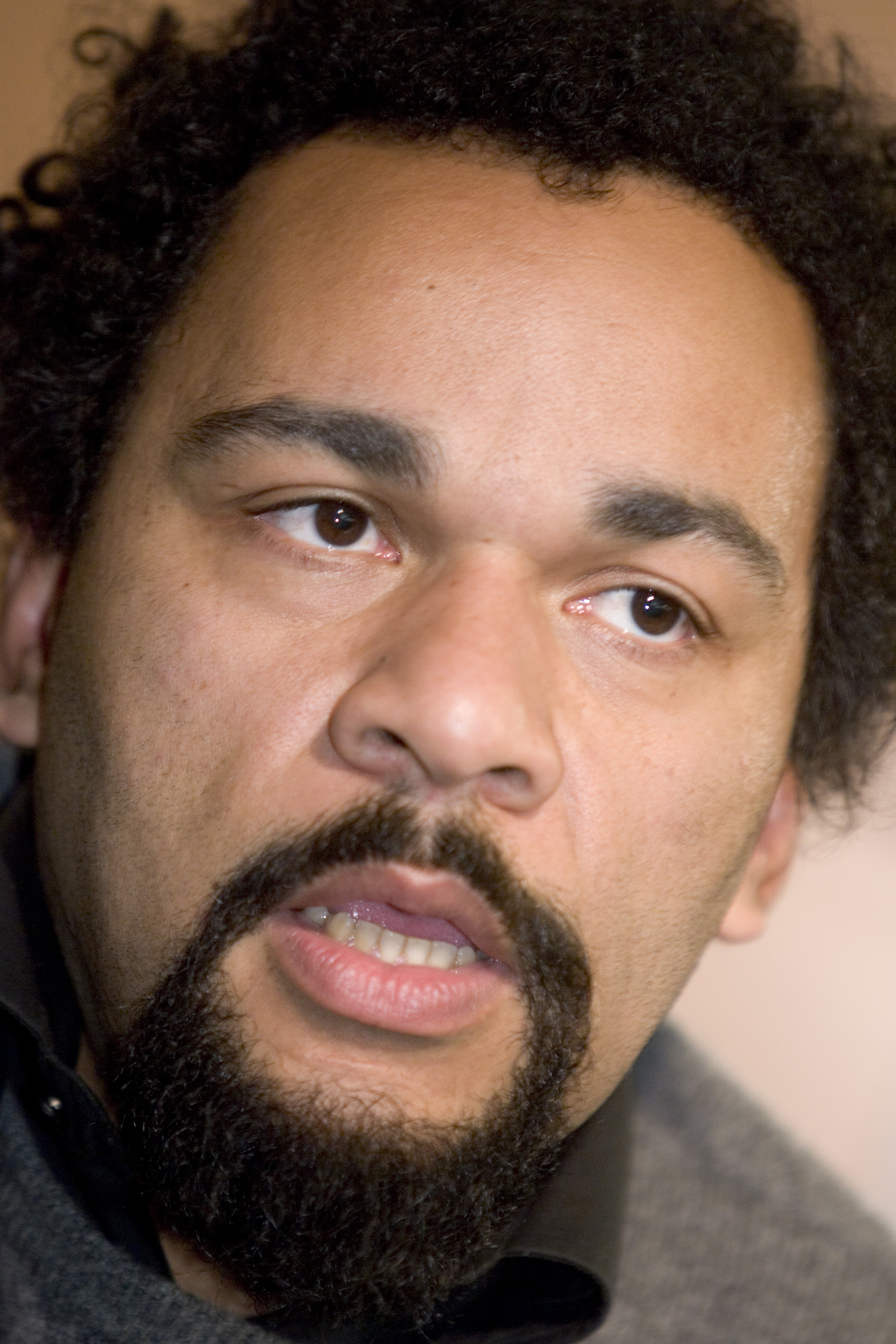
Dieudonné

Élie and Dieudonné (French: Élie et Dieudonné), was a French comedic duo composed of Élie Semoun and Dieudonné. The duo was productive from 1990 until their dissolution in 1997, after which each has continued to perform separately.

A recurring theme of the comedic duo was based on the African background of Dieudonné and the Jewish background of Élie Semoun, which they used to denounce and combat racism in their two communities.

The two comedians had certain recurring qualities to the characters they played, with Dieudonné playing a person who was imposing and unstable, while Élie played a man who was small and hysterical.

They separated in 1997 due to artistic and financial disputes, shortly after filming their only feature film together, Le Clone, and shortly before it was released. They had a brief reunion in late 2002 in Thierry Ardisson's Tout le monde en parle. However, many controversies pitted the two former friends against one another after 2005. After several reconciliations, Semoun eventually halted any possibility of a reconciliation and reformation of the duo when he learned that Dieudonné had chosen Jean-Marie Le Pen to be the godfather of one of his daughters.

== Performances ==
=== Theater ===
- 1991–1993: Élie et Dieudonné
- 1996: Élie et Dieudonné en garde à vue

=== Television ===
- 1993: L'Avis des bêtes. Une certaine idée de la France

== Film ==
- 1998: Le Clone, directed by Fabio Conversi
