= Under the Eiffel Tower =

- Theatrical release poster
- Directed by: Archie Borders
- Screenplay by: Archie Borders; David Henry; Judith Godrèche
- Produced by: Judith Godrèche; Paul Davidson; Daniela DiGiacomo; Brad Navin; Matt Walsh
- Starring: Matt Walsh; Judith Godrèche; Reid Scott
- Cinematography: Léo Hinstin
- Edited by: Libby Cuenin
- Music by: Joseph Stephens
- Production companies: 180 Degrees; The Orchard
- Distributed by: The Orchard
- Release dates: June 3, 2018 (Berkshire); February 8, 2019 (United States)
- Running time: 87 minutes
- Country: United States
- Language: English
- Box office: $3,957

Under the Eiffel Tower is a 2018 comedy film directed by Archie Borders and written by Borders, David Henry and Judith Godrèche. The film stars Matt Walsh, Judith Godrèche, Reid Scott, Michaela Watkins, David Wain, Dylan Gelula, Gary Cole, and Ary Abittan. The film premiered at the Berkshire International Film Festival on June 3, 2018. It was released on February 8, 2019, by The Orchard.

== Plot ==
The film opens with Stuart being fired for his excessive bourbon drinking. His friend invites the depressed Stuart to join his family on a trip to Paris. Under the Eiffel Tower, 50-something Stuart proposes to 26 year-old Rosalind. She is shocked and declines, considering Stuart to be only a friend. Greatly embarrassed Stuart decides to return home.

At the airport, Stuart meets Liam and tells him the story of what happened and Liam persuades Stuart to come and travel with him by train across France. On the train Liam, a recently divorced Scotsman, and Stuart meet Louise, a French winemaker, as she sits in the train carriage with Stuart and Liam. The three depart the train and all have dinner together. Liam offers to pay for dinner but his card is declined. Stuart gives up his engagement ring to secure the bill. The two men spend the night on park benches. That day they join a tour group that happens to tour Louise's winery. The guys meet Gerard, whom Louise cares for. Stuart cooks dinner and the guys spend the night at the winery. Louise sleeps with the younger Liam, but the next day spends all her time with Stuart.

Stuart, a salesman, calls his boss and asks for his job back if he buys the French winery. He also asks his boss to mail a case of bourbon to Max to get his engagement ring released. The guys stay for Gerard's birthday party, for which Stuart cooks a lamb dinner. That night, Louise sleeps with Stuart. Everyone sees them as a perfect match. Stuart is crushed to learn Louise and Gerard are married. Liam is betrayed, and has a fistfight with Stuart. Louise also feels betrayed by Stuart's efforts to buy the vineyard. Gerard unexpectedly dies. Stuart flies home, and Louise closes the winery.

Stuart is miserable, and Louise will not return any calls. He gets on a plane and returns to France to see the woman he loves. The winery sale to Stuart's boss is completed, and he and Louise reconcile.

== Cast ==
- Matt Walsh as Stuart
- Judith Godrèche as Louise
- Reid Scott as Liam
- Michaela Watkins as Tillie
- David Wain as Frank
- Dylan Gelula as Rosalind
- Gary Cole as Gerard
- Ary Abittan as Frederic

== Reception ==
A review in The Hollywood Reporter said that Walsh "makes an unlikely but effective transition to leading man" and that the film "has a sweetness that's impossible to entirely resist". In a New York Times review the film was described as having a "dumb opening".
