= Franck Gastambide =

French actor, film director, screenwriter and producer (born 1978)

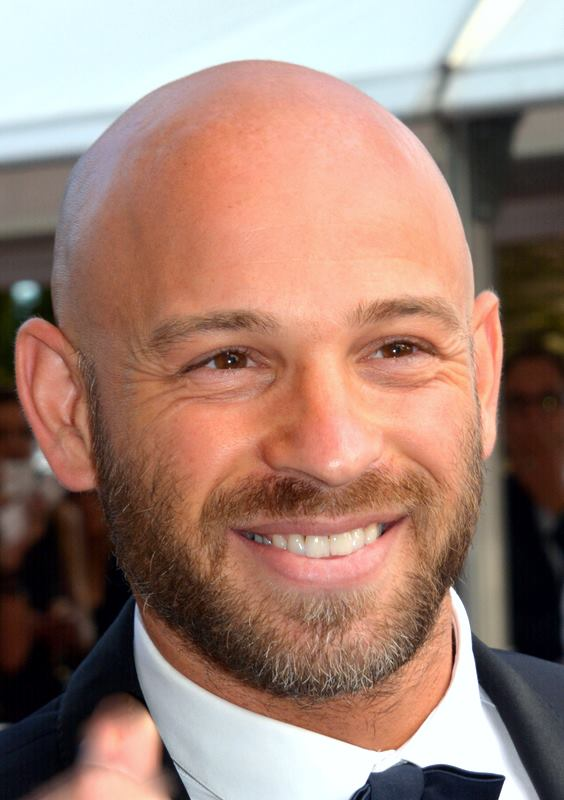
- Franck Gastambide in 2016
- Born: 31 October 1978 (age 47); Melun, Seine-et-Marne, Île-de-France, France
- Occupations: Actor, film director, screenwriter
- Years active: 2009—present

Franck Gastambide (French pronunciation: [fʁɑ̃k ɡastɑ̃bid]; born 31 October 1978) is a French actor, film director, screenwriter and producer. He became famous in 2009 after creating the first web series from Canal+, Kaïra Shopping, which was later shown on television and adapted to the film in 2012. Also between 2009 and 2011, Gastambide made commercials for the Pepsi brand. He played the main role of a policeman in the movie Taxi 5.

== Biography ==
At the age of 13, he became interested in Molossian dogs and took up their training. After receiving a guard's certificate, he worked as a seller in the Leroy Merlin chain, continuing to train the dogs. At the age of 20, he became a recognized expert on dogs of the so-called "dangerous breeds". At age 22, he was involved in filming the film The Crimson Rivers as a trainer of Rottweilers and Pit Bull Terriers. In 2004, participated in the shooting of the movie The Magnificent Four.

On the shooting of the picture The Crimson Rivers Franck became friends with the actor and director Mathieu Kassovitz. With his help, Gastambide met with young directors Kim Chapiron and Romain Gavras, with whom he took his first steps in acting career, taking part in several short films and hip-hop music videos (DJ Mehdi, Mafia K-1 Fry).

In parallel, Gastambide participates in the filming of several dozen films, television films and television shows as a dog trainer. Also Franck, as a cinematographer, helped journalist Mouloud Achour make reports for MTV.

In 2009, he made a mini-series Kaïra Shopping, a satiric take on a television newsreel. The series was shot on a low budget, in a clip-art manner. Thanks to the success on the Internet, the actors of the series Franck Gastambide, Medi Sadoun and Zib Pokti, were invited by Ramzi Bedia to make a cameo in his movie Bacon on the Side. The series was released on the air on Canal+, and then extended for another three seasons.

After that, Frank Gastambide signed a contract with the company Mandarin Cinéma (known for its pictures OSS 117, Brice de Nice, Potiche, The Conquest) for his directorial debut, in which the characters of Kaïra Shopping were supposed to be used. The consent to the shooting in the debut picture of Gastambide was given by such stars as Ramzi Bedia, François Damiens, Eric Cantona, Élie Semoun, Alex Lutz and Alice Belaïdi, rappers Mafia K'1 Fry, Katsuni and Cut Killer. This was the first time when a full-length film was shot based on a web-show.

Distributor of the film, entitled Porn in the Hood, became the company Gaumont, and it premiered at the Cannes Film Festival. The film was released on 11 July 2012, quickly gaining recognition from both critics and the public. The film was watched by more than a million viewers. That allowed it to become the most profitable French film in 2012.

For the picture Porn in the Hood, Gastambide received the Prize for the first best film of the magazine Le Film français along with Ramzi Bedia, Alice Belaidi and the producers Eric and Nicolas Altmayer.

On 22 February 2013 Gastambide, together with Sadoun and Pokti, hosted the ceremony for the French César film awards, presenting prizes for the best sound and the best picture.

After the success of his film Porn in the Hood, Gastambide starred in a number of popular comedies, such as Vive la France, I Kissed a Girl and Good luck, Sam.

The second director's work of Gastambide was the picture Pattaya, narrating about the misadventures of three men on holiday in Thailand. His second film had a much larger budget than the first and a number of famous French comedians such as Gad Elmaleh, Ramzi Bedia, Sabrina Ouazani and Malik Bentalha took part in his shooting.

In 2018, Gastambide directed the fifth part of the film series Taxi, also playing one of the principal roles in it.

== Filmography ==
=== Director & writer ===
- 2009: Kaïra Shopping (TV Mini-series)
- 2012: Porn in the Hood
- 2016: Pattaya (also screenplay)
- 2018: Taxi 5 (also scenario)
- 2020: Validé (also creator of series) (TV series, 10 episodes)
- 2023: Medellin

=== Actor ===
| Year | Title | Role | Director | Notes |
|---|---|---|---|---|
| 2009–11 | Kaïra Shopping (web + TV miniseries) | Moustène | Franck Gastambide | Also director & writer |
| 2010 | Bacon on the Side | One of the 3 Swiss | Anne Depétrini | |
| 2011 | De force | Nike cap | Frank Henry | |
| 2011 | De l'huile sur le feu | A supporter | Nicolas Benamou | |
| 2012 | Porn in the Hood | Moustène | Franck Gastambide | Also director & writer |
| 2012 | Le Golden Show | Roman Kaira | François Descraques | TV series (1 episode) |
| 2013 | Vive la France | Kevin | Michaël Youn | |
| 2013 | Le débarquement | Various | Renaud Le Van Kim | TV series (1 episode) |
| 2014 | Les Gazelles | Eric | Mona Achache | |
| 2015 | Made in France | Dubreuil | Nicolas Boukhrief | |
| 2015 | I Kissed a Girl | Charles | Maxime Govare & Noémie Saglio | |
| 2015 | Rabid Dogs | Manu | Éric Hannezo | |
| 2015 | Good Luck Algeria | Stéphane | Farid Bentoumi | |
| 2016 | Pattaya | Francky | Franck Gastambide | Also director & writer |
| 2016 | Hibou | The volunteer | Ramzy Bedia | |
| 2016 | Cigarettes et chocolat chaud | Pierrot | Sophie Reine | |
| 2017 | Sahara | Pitt | Pierre Coré | |
| 2017 | L'embarras du choix | Gilles | Eric Lavaine | |
| 2018 | La surface de réparation | Franck | Christophe Régin | |
| 2018 | Taxi 5 | Sylvain Marot | Franck Gastambide | Also writer |
| 2018 | Belleville Cop | Roland | Rachid Bouchareb | |
| 2019 | A Good Doctor | Grisoni | Tristan Séguéla | |
| 2022 | Sans répit | Thomas | Régis Blondeau | |
| 2023 | Medellin | Stan | Franck Gastambide | |
| 2024 | The Wages of Fear | Fred | Julien Leclercq | |
