= I Feel Better (film) =

2017 film by Jean-Pierre Améris

- Theatrical release poster
- Directed by: Jean-Pierre Améris
- Written by: Jean-Pierre Améris
- Based on: Je vais mieux by David Foenkinos
- Produced by: Dominique Farrugia
- Starring: Éric Elmosnino; Ary Abittan; Judith El Zein; Alice Pol; François Berléand
- Cinematography: Matthieu Poirot-Delpech
- Edited by: Anne Souriau
- Production company: EuropaCorp
- Distributed by: EuropaCorp. Distribution
- Release dates: 16 September 2017 (Biel/Bienne French Film Festival); 30 May 2018
- Running time: 86 minutes
- Country: France
- Language: French
- Budget: $7.8 million
- Box office: $1 million

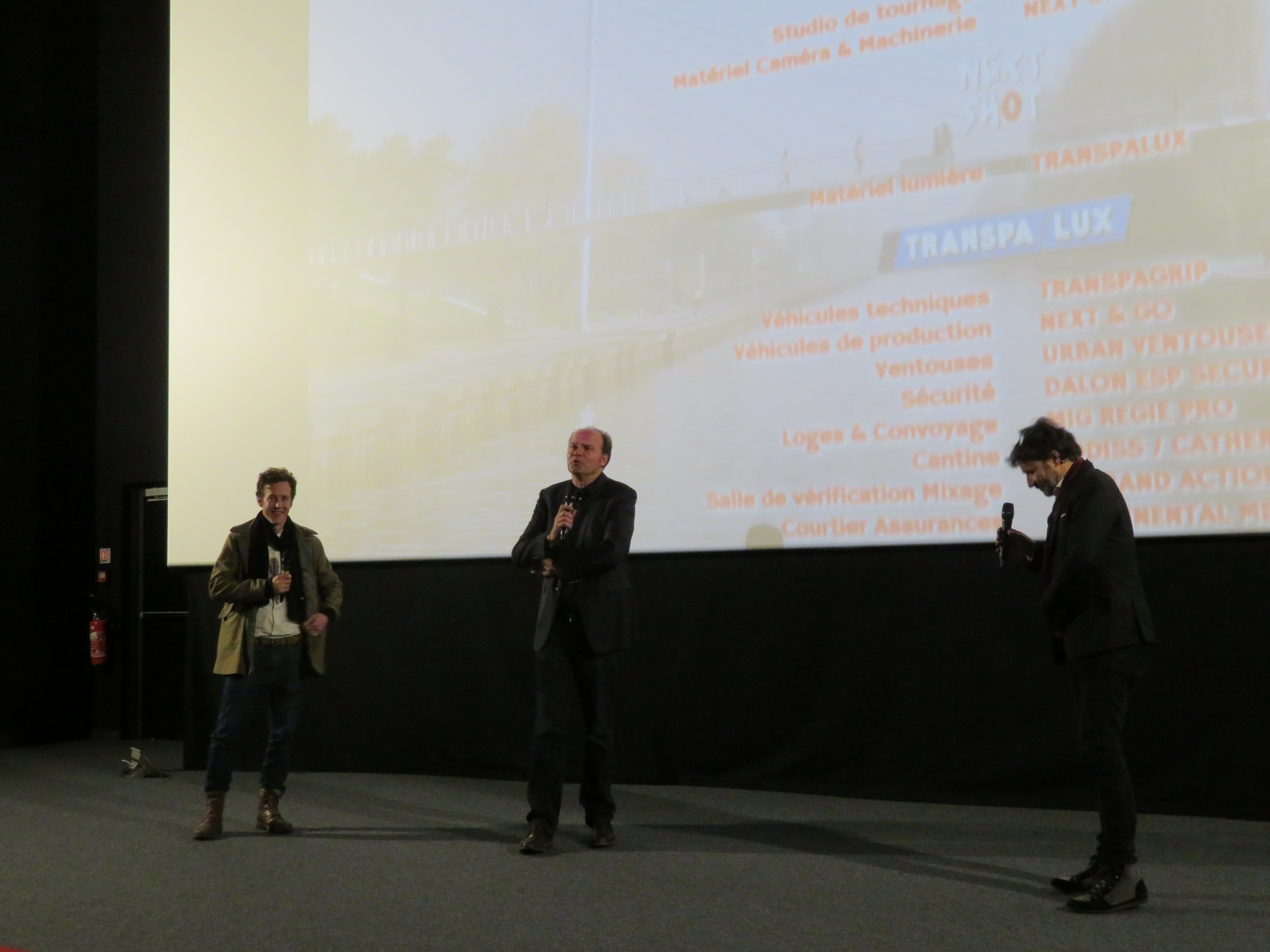
Composer Quentin Sirjacq, director Jean-Pierre Améris and journalist Christophe Carrière at the premiere of the film "Je Vais Mieux" by Jean-Pierre Améris in Beauvais (Oise), on November 24, 2017

I Feel Better (French: Je vais mieux) is a 2017 French comedy film directed by Jean-Pierre Améris.

== Cast ==
- Éric Elmosnino: Laurent
- Ary Abittan: Edouard
- Judith El Zein: Elise
- Alice Pol: Pauline
- François Berléand: Audibert
- Lise Lamétrie: Laurent's mother
- Henri Guybet: Laurent's father
- Sacha Bourdo: Vassilis
- Sabine Pakora: The prostitute
