= Porn in the Hood =

2012 film by Franck Gastambide

- Theatrical release poster
- French: Les Kaïra
- Directed by: Franck Gastambide
- Written by: Franck Gastambide
- Produced by: Eric Altmayer; Nicolas Altmayer; Jean-Charles Felli; Christophe Tomas
- Starring: Medi Sadoun; Franck Gastambide; Jib; Ramzy
- Cinematography: Antoine Marteau
- Edited by: Véronique Parnet
- Music by: DJ Cut Killer; Hervé Rakotofiringa; Éric Neveux
- Production companies: Save Ferris; Mandarin Cinéma; Gaumont
- Distributed by: Gaumont
- Release date: 11 July 2012 (France)
- Running time: 95 minutes
- Country: France
- Language: French
- Budget: $4.6 million
- Box office: $7.9 million

Porn in the Hood (French: Les Kaïra, pronounced [le kajʁa]) is a 2012 French sex comedy film written and directed by Franck Gastambide, based on the web series Kaira Shopping. It was the highest-grossing French film of 2012.

== Plot ==
The film follows the misadventures of three young men, Mousten, Abdelkrim and Momo, who have been friends since childhood and never left their hometown, Melun. Unemployed, without ambition or a purpose in life, they spend part of their time watching porn films and eventually become convinced that entering the porn industry could make them rich and famous. They meet a sleazy producer, who asks them to provide a video demonstration. Embarking on a quest to find a girl for their video, the three friends must face a series of humiliating mishaps.

== Cast ==
- Medi Sadoun as Abdelkrim
- Franck Gastambide as Mousten
- Jib as Momo
- Ramzy as Warner
- Alice Belaïdi as Kadija
- Pom Klementieff as Tia
- Demon One as Steeve
- Ismaël Sy Savané as Ismaël
- Annabelle Lengronne as Stay
- Sissi Duparc as Sylvaine
- François Damiens as Claude Fachoune
- Doudou Masta as organizer of rap festival
- François Bureloup as Bernard
- Alex Lutz as The Egyptian
- Katsuni as herself
- Armelle as Libertine orgy's organizer
- Eric Cantona as coach of the football team
- Elie Semoun as himself
- François Levantal as sex-shop owner
- Cut Killer as hip-hop festival DJ
- Mister You as himself
- Rocco Siffredi as himself
- Sir Samuel as the Boss
- Bridgette B as the American
- Mafia K'1 fry as themselves
- Ali Marhyar
