= Kirikou and the Wild Beasts =

Kirikou and the Wild Beasts Kirikou et les Bêtes sauvages
- Directed by: Michel Ocelot; Bénédicte Galup
- Written by: Philippe Andrieux; Bénédicte Galup; Marie Locatelli; Michel Ocelot
- Produced by: Didier Brunner
- Starring: Pierre-Ndoffé Sarr; Awa Sene Sarr
- Music by: Manu Dibango et al.
- Production companies: Les Armateurs; Jet Media; Armada
- Distributed by: Gébéka Films
- Release dates: 13 May 2005 (Cannes); 7 December 2005 (France)
- Running time: 75 minutes
- Countries: France; Vietnam; Latvia
- Language: French
- Budget: $4.8 million
- Box office: $13 million

Kirikou and the Wild Beasts (French: Kirikou et les Bêtes sauvages) is a 2005 French animated feature film. It premiered at the 2005 Cannes Film Festival on 13 May and, unlike its predecessor, received only festival screenings in all English-speaking territories. It was released on English-subtitled DVD-Video in the United States by KimStim (distributed by Kino International) on 29 July 2008 as Kirikou and the Wild Beast.

== Synopsis ==
The film is a sub-story to Kirikou and the Sorceress rather than a straight sequel. The movie is set while Kirikou is still a child and Karaba is still a sorceress. Like Princes et Princesses and Les Contes de la nuit, it is an anthology film comprising several episodic stories, each of them describing Kirikou's interactions with different animals. It is however unique among Michel Ocelot's films, not only in that it is co-directed by Bénédicte Galup (who has previously worked with him as an animator) but also for each of the stories being written by a different person (in all other cases, Ocelot has been the sole writer and director of his films).

== Cast ==
- Pierre-Ndoffé Sarr as Kirikou
- Awa Sene Sarr as Karaba
- Robert Liensol as The grandfather
- Marie-Philomène Nga as The mother
- Emile Abossolo M'Bo as The uncle
- Pascal N'Zonzi as The old man

== Production ==
Michel Ocelot stated at the film's release that he was somewhat convinced, albeit reluctantly, of the ease of making a second film about Kirikou after the success of Kirikou and the Sorceress. Initially opposed to sequels and spin-off products, he agrees to create two illustrated books, then is offered to develop Kirikou adventures for television or DVD release; he ultimately opts for a second feature film, initially titled Four Stories of Kirikou, which he co-directs with Bénédicte Galup, who had been working with him for a long time. Kirikou and the Wild Animals is a midquel (“intra-adventure”) to Kirikou and the Sorceress, meaning that the action takes place chronologically during the events of the first film. Michel Ocelot directed Kirikou and the Wild Animals while also working on Azur and Asmar; this led him to entrust more responsibilities to the members of his team.

The film required four years of work from the Franco-Vietnamese-Latvian team that created the 500,000 drawings necessary to complete 70% of the film; the remaining 30% consists of computer-generated imagery. Kirikou and the Wild Animals was presented out of competition at the Cannes Film Festival on May 13, 2005 during a session reserved for children, and was released in theaters on December 7.

== Reception ==
The film received highly positive reviews from French critics. The site Allociné gives the film just over four stars out of five, based on twenty-three press reviews. Most critics agree that the second installment of Kirikou's adventures is a worthy “sequel” to the first, both in terms of graphics and storyline, despite the absence of the element of surprise. Michel Roudevitch, in Libération, describes the film as “lush, hilarious, and warm.” Jacques Mandelbaum, in Le Monde, views it as “a thoroughly commendable sequel that will surely delight the little ones.” Marine Landrot, in Télérama, appreciates the diversity of rhythm and tone in the four stories that comprise the film, concluding with a wish for a third film “as demanding and graceful as the first two.” The script of the various stories convinces a majority of critics; however, Isabelle Daniel, in Première, “regrets a bit the narrative ease” but believes that “the magic truly works.”

== Video Releases ==
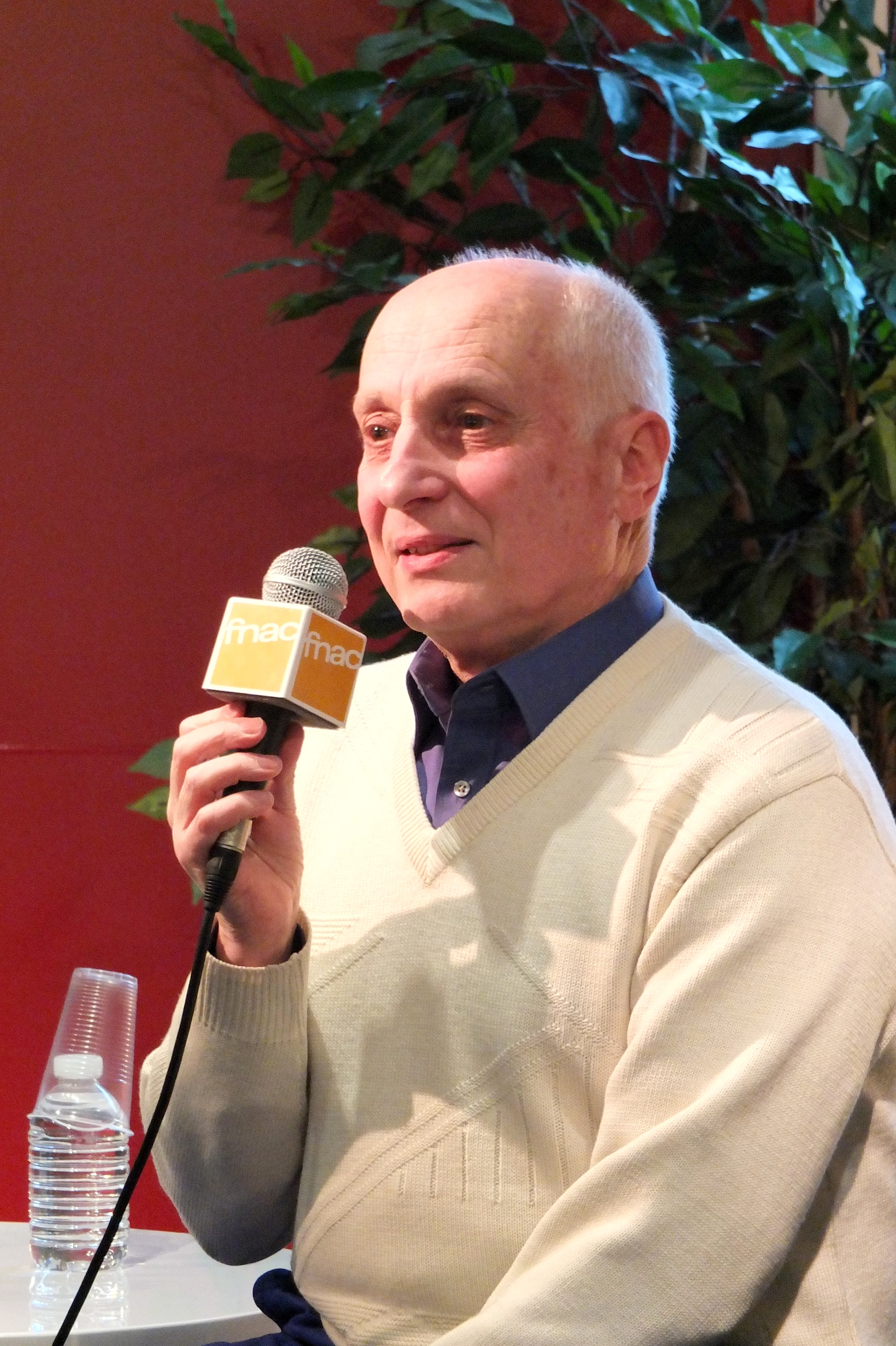
The film's creator, Michel Ocelot, in February 2013 in Paris, promoting the film's video release.

=== DVD Editions ===
The film was released on DVD on August 17, 2006. Three different editions were released simultaneously: the standard edition, published by Warner Home Video, and the “collector” and “prestige” editions published by France Télévisions. The standard edition includes as extras the film's trailers as well as a karaoke clip of the song Kirikou, the Naked Child, the Black Child. The “collector” edition includes more extras (a making of, an animation lesson with Michel Ocelot, DVD-Rom content) and a second DVD with further DVD-Rom contents. The “prestige” edition includes both DVDs as well as a book about the film and a CD of the soundtrack.

In October 2008, a “Complete Kirikou” box set, in the shape of Kirikou's head, encompasses the DVDs of Kirikou and the Sorceress, Kirikou and the Wild Animals, the musical Kirikou and Karaba created in 2007, along with a documentary Kirikou Presents the Animals of Africa and a coloring book with colored pencils.

=== Blu-ray Edition ===
The film was released on Blu-ray by France Télévisions on August 20, 2008; the DVD includes the making of the film and the animation lesson from Michel Ocelot; the extras include subtitles for the deaf and hard of hearing.

== Spin-off Products and Adaptations ==
A video game based on the film, Kirikou and the Wild Beasts, developed by Wizarbox and published by Emme Entertainment, was released in March 2007. It is a platform game aimed at very young children (the publisher presents it as playable from three years old), which retraces the various adventures narrated by the film. However, the PEGI classifies the game as “7+”, which advises against it for the child audience aged 3 to 7 for which it was designed, after considering that “some images or sounds may frighten or disturb”.

An animal documentary Kirikou Discovers the Animals of Africa, directed by Jean-François Bordier and aimed at young children, aired on France 3 in September 2007 in the form of an animated series consisting of 30 episodes of 3 minutes, then released on DVD in December.

Kirikou Magazine, a bimonthly magazine aimed at young children, was launched in December 2006; it was published by Paperbook and distributed by Logodata. It developed new stories about Kirikou, documentary pages, games, and activities. The magazine ceased publication after its eighth issue in December 2008.

The success of the animated film also led to the creation of a musical, Kirikou and Karaba, established in 2007.
