= Frédéric Chau =

French actor

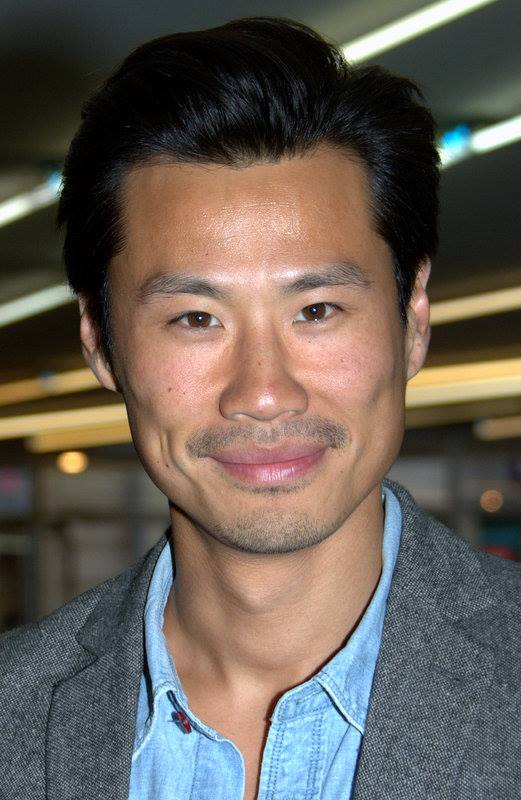
- Frédéric Chau in 2014
- Born: 6 June 1977 (age 49); Ho Chi Minh City, Vietnam
- Citizenship: France
- Occupation: Actor
- Years active: 2006–present

Frédéric Chau (French: [fʁedeʁik ʃo]; born 6 June 1977) is a French actor.

== Life and career ==
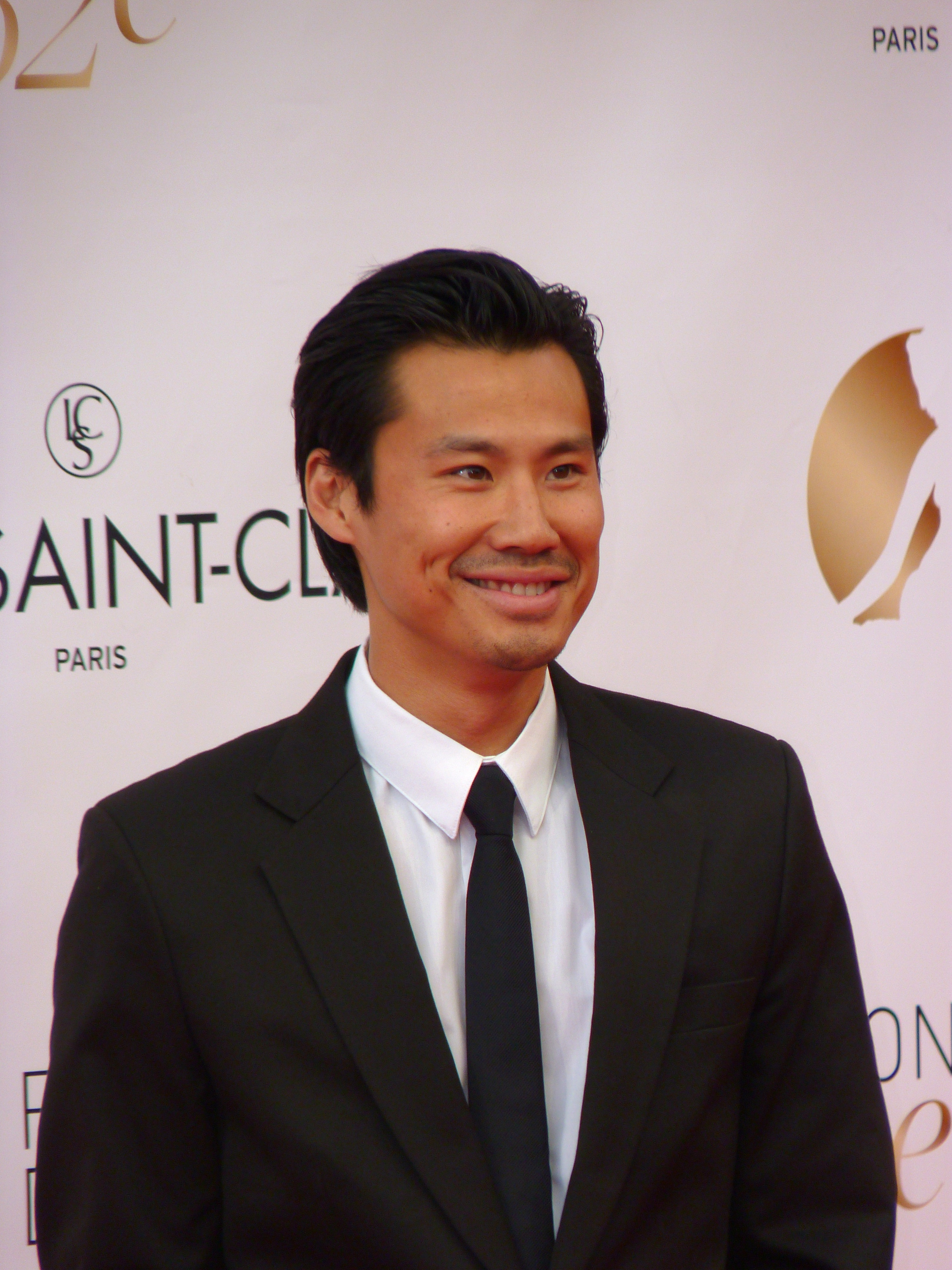
Frédéric Chau in 2012

Frédéric Chau was born in Ho Chi Minh City, Vietnam, to parents of the Chinese minority in Cambodia. In 1977, while his mother was pregnant with him, his parents left Phnom Penh for Vietnam in order to escape the Khmer Rouge who were massacring civilians. He was only six months old when his family emigrated to France. They settled in the district of Marx-Dormoy in the 18th arrondissement of Paris, then moved very quickly to the Paris suburbs in Villetaneuse, Seine-Saint-Denis.

After being spotted by a fashion photographer, he briefly worked as a model for the People International advertising agency. Passionate about travel, he was recruited in 1998 by Air France as a steward, while he took comedy classes.

In 2005, Frédéric Chau went on stage and made a name for himself by performing different skits and performing in several stand-up scenes, notably at the Ménilmontant theater. In 2006, wearing his white shirt, his tie and his impeccable suit jacket, he was the only Asian at the Jamel Comedy Club and he enjoyed it: "Not easy to be an Asian comedian if you do not do karate, spring rolls, or you know nothing about computers!"

In 2010 he had a small role in the French/Hollywood production From Paris With Love (2010), starring John Rhys Meyers and John Travolta, as a Chinese maître'd employed by the French-Asian Triads.

In 2014, he played in Serial (Bad) Weddings with Christian Clavier and Chantal Lauby by Philippe de Chauveron. The same year, he played a secondary role in Lucy, Luc Besson's blockbuster, which earned him the title of "Most successful French actor in 2014" by Première magazine, which noted that the accumulation of these two successes allowed him to total nearly 17.5 million ticket sales over the year.

In September 2015, he published an autobiography, Je viens de si loin (I come from so far in English), with Philippe Rey Editions. He reveals much about himself on his journey, the exile of his parents, the life of an immigrant in this country and in this city, and his experiences with assimilation/integration.

In 2019, he starred in a lead role in a film called Made in China (2019).

== Filmography ==
=== Feature films ===
Year	Title	Role	Director	Notes
2008	Crise dans le secteur bancaire	Martin	Marc Schaus	Short film
2008	Osc DisT		Fabius Dubois	Short film
2009	5 films contre l'homophobie : Fusion Man	Marc	Xavier Gens & Marius Vale	Short film
2009	Eden Is West	The Asian	Costa-Gavras	
2009	District 13: Ultimatum	Tran	Patrick Alessandrin	
2009	Neuilly Yo Mama!	Chow-Yung-Fi	Gabriel Laferrière	
2009	Beverly Hills Chihuahua	El Diablo	Raja Gosnell	French voice
2010	Rien à perdre		Jean-Henri Meunier	Short film
2010	Coursier	Rico	Hervé Renoh	
2010	From Paris with Love	Chinese Maitre d'	Pierre Morel	
2010	Les Princes de la nuit		Patrick Levy	
2010	Bacon on the Side	Lucien	Anne De Petrini	
2011	Halal police d'État	Mathieu Cohen	Rachid Dhibou	
2011	Mince alors!	Baptiste	Charlotte De Turckheim	
2013	Rock Paper Scissors (Roche papier ciseaux)	Muffin	Yan Turgeon Lanouette	
2013	Paris à tout prix	Mister Chan	Reem Kherici	
2014	Serial (Bad) Weddings	Chao Ling	Philippe de Chauveron	
2014	Dealer	Linux	Jean Luc Herbulot	
2014	Lucy	The Steward	Luc Besson	
2015	Feuilles de printemps	Gregoire Nguyen	Stéphane Ly-Cuong	Short film
2016	Uchronia	The Global Minister of Homelessness and you and me	Christophe Gofette	
2017	Valerian and the City of a Thousand Planets	Sergeant Neza	Luc Besson	French voice
2018	Serial (Bad) Weddings 2	Chao Ling	Philippe de Chauveron	
2018	Made in China	François	Julien Abraham	
2019	The Translators	Chen Yao	Régis Roinsard	

=== Television ===
Year	Title	Role	Director	Notes
2008	La Taupe	François Shaozu	Vincenzo Marano	TV movie
2008	Inside Jamel Comedy Club	Himself	Jamel Debbouze	TV series
2009	La Belle Vie	Tin Kok	Virginie Wagon	TV movie
2009	La Taupe 2	François Shaozu	Vincenzo Marano	TV movie
2009	Les Incroyables Aventures de Fusion Man	Marc	Xavier Gens	TV movie
2013	Les Limiers	Dr. Nguyen	Alain DesRochers	TV series - Episode 1
2015	Nos chers voisins	Martin, Karine's ex		Guest
2017	Kim Kong	Choi Han Sung	Stephen Cafiero	TV series

=== Music video ===
Year	Music	Singer
2002	1er Gaou	Magic System
2010	Splinters of Soul	Chloé Micout
2013	D'un ave Maria	Pascal Obispo

== Publication ==
- Je viens de si loin, éditions Philippe Rey, 2015.
