= Vive la France =

- Film poster
- Directed by: Michaël Youn
- Written by: Michaël Youn; Dominique Gauriaud; Jurij Prette
- Produced by: Alain Goldman
- Starring: José García; Michaël Youn
- Cinematography: Stéphane Le Parc
- Edited by: Sandro Lavezzi; Nicolas Trembasiewicz
- Music by: Freaks
- Production company: Gaumont
- Distributed by: Gaumont
- Release date: 20 February 2013
- Running time: 94 minutes
- Country: France
- Language: French
- Budget: $17.5 million
- Box office: $10 million

Vive la France is a 2013 French comedy film directed by Michaël Youn.

== Plot ==
Taboulistan is a tiny fictional country in Central Asia, supposedly wedged between Afghanistan, Kyrgyzstan and Tajikistan, virtually unknown to the world. Its only asset is a reputation for inventing tabbouleh. Alas, the Lebanese have stolen the recipe that their country is famous for. Two half-brother shepherds are sent to France by Taboulistan's president to promote the country. Their method: "terrorist advertising". They seek to destroy the Eiffel Tower using a plane. Following a strike at Paris-Charles de Gaulle airport, they land in Corsica. They meet with Corsican nationalists and board a boat for Marseille. Unfortunately, one of them is the victim of an attack because he was wearing a PSG shirt, followed by a medical error. Unaware of their true motives a journalist helps them to go to Paris in order to correct the error. En route, they meet many hospitable people and overcome obstacles filled with hijinks. Once in Paris, neither of the brothers can go through with the plan while, unbeknownst to them, the Taboulistani government has sent a back-up crew. Luckily the brothers recognize them and foil their plan, becoming international heroes in the process and ironically bringing fame to Taboulistan.

== Cast ==
- José García as Muzafar
- Michaël Youn as Ferouz
- Isabelle Funaro as Marianne Bouvier
- Ary Abittan as Jafaraz Ouèchemagül
- Moussa Maaskri as Adadat Ouèchmagül
- Vincent Moscato as Uncle Momo
- Guilaine Londez as Aunt Nanette
- Franck Gastambide as Kevin
- Jérôme Commandeur as Policeman
- Émilie Caen as Hostess
- Jean-François Cayrey as Paris Taxi Driver

== Production ==
Filming partially took place in the Lot department.
