= Laurence Arcadias =

French/American experimental animator

Laurence Arcadias is a French/American experimental animator working in the United States. She has directed and written several short films including Tempête dans une chambre à coucher (Tempest in a Bedroom), Dust Off and Cowboy Up!, and Bavure. She is a professor and previous chair of the animation department at the Maryland Institute College of Art (MICA) in Baltimore. Her films have been exhibited and won awards at numerous international film festivals around the world. Arcadias and Juliette Marchand's stop motion film Tempête dans une chambre à coucher was short-listed for a 2013 César Award, the French equivalent of an Academy Award. Her previous work includes being an illustrator and animator for French television programs, including directing an animation show called Alex, which was awarded the prize for Best Short Animation TV show at the 1989 Annecy International Animation Film Festival. She was subsequently awarded a Lavoisier Scholarship from the French government and became Animator in Residence at Apple's Advanced Technology Group, where she directed Donor Party, and taught at City College of San Francisco, California College of Arts and Crafts, University of California, Berkeley, San Francisco Art Institute, and the San Francisco Academy of Art University prior to joining MICA. She is the co-lead of a "STEAM" animation/science collaboration (AstroAnimation.org) where students work directly with scientists to produce animations based on NASA astrophysics and planetary research. In 2026 she received a PhD based on this work from Liverpool John Moores University. Arcadias is a co-founder of the French film production company Amorce films.

== Selected Scholarly Publications ==
- An Astro-Animation Class: Optimizing Artistic, Educational, and Outreach Outcomes, Leonardo, (2022) https://doi.org/10.1162/leon_a_02241
- Astro-animation and Informal STEM Learning, Research Notes of the American Astronomical Society (2021), https://iopscience.iop.org/article/10.3847/2515-5172/ac01d3
- Astro-animation: A case study of art and science education, Animation Practice, Process & Production (2020), https://doi.org/10.1386/ap3_000018_1
- Animating Fermi—A Collaboration between Art Students and Astronomers, Leonardo (2015), https://doi.org/10.1162/LEON_a_01123
