= Noom Diawara =

French actor (born 1978)

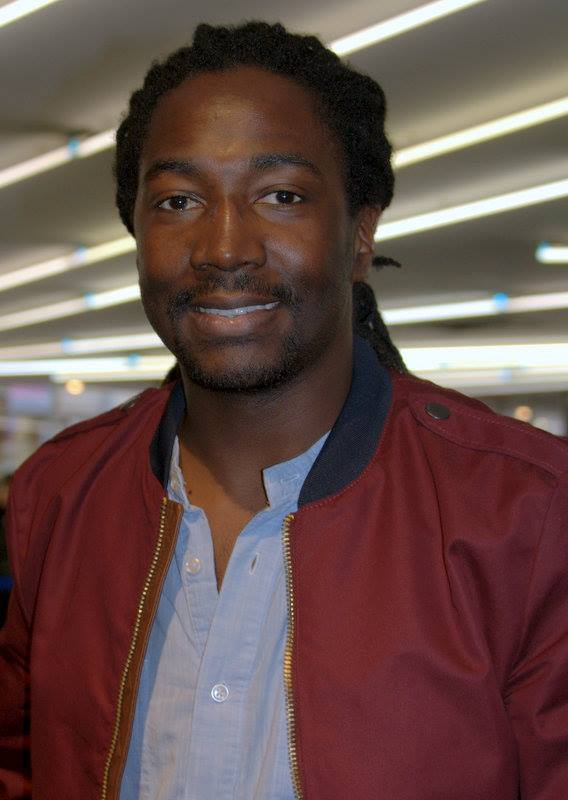
- Born: Nouhoum Diawara; 26 December 1978 (age 46); Paris, France
- Occupation: Actor

Noom Diawara (born 26 December 1978) is a French actor. He is known for playing the role of Charles in Serial (Bad) Weddings.
