= Philippe de Chauveron =

French film director and writer (born 1965)

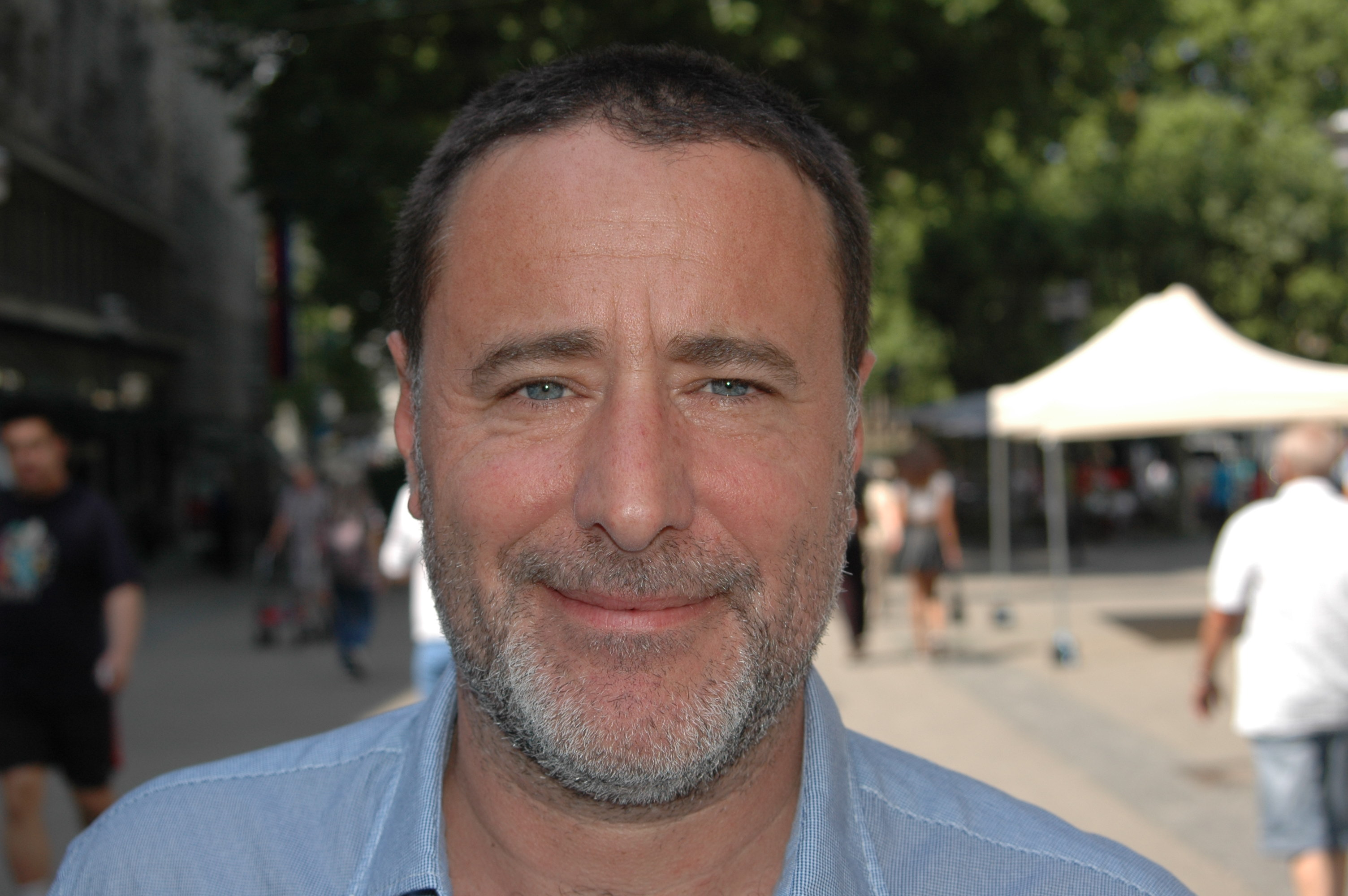
- Occupations: Film director, writer

Philippe de Chauveron (French: [filip də ʃovʁɔ̃]; born 15 November 1965) is a French film director, and writer. He is best known for his 2014 film Serial (Bad) Weddings.

== Filmography ==
=== Directing ===
==== Film ====
Year	Title	Credited as		Notes
Year	Title	Director	Writer	Notes
2011	L'Élève Ducobu	Yes	Yes	
2014	Serial (Bad) Weddings	Yes	Yes	
2017	With Open Arms	Yes	No	
2019	Serial (Bad) Weddings 2	Yes	Yes	
2021	Serial (Bad) Weddings 3	Yes	Yes	
