= List of French films of 2017 =

A list of French-produced films scheduled for release in 2017.

== Films ==
Title	Director	Cast	Genre	Notes
Alibi.com	Philippe Lacheau	Philippe Lacheau, Élodie Fontan	Comedy	
Ava	Léa Mysius	Noée Abita, Laure Calamy, Juan Cano		
BPM (Beats per Minute)	Robin Campillo	Nahuel Pérez Biscayart, Arnaud Valois, Adèle Haenel		
Call Me by Your Name	Luca Guadagnino	Armie Hammer, Timothée Chalamet, Michael Stuhlbarg	—N/a	Italian-American-Brazilian-French co-production
C'est la vie!	Éric Toledano and Olivier Nakache	Jean-Pierre Bacri, Gilles Lellouche, Jean-Paul Rouve		
Ciel Rouge	Olivier Lorelle	Cyril Descours, Audrey Giacomini		
Cold Skin	Xavier Gens	David Oakes, Aura Garrido, Ray Stevenson		Spanish-French co-production
Dunkirk	Christopher Nolan	Fionn Whitehead, Tom Glynn-Carney, Jack Lowden	—N/a	British-American-French-Dutch co-production
Épouse-moi mon pote	Tarek Boudali	Tarek Boudali, Philippe Lacheau		
Heaven Will Wait	Marie-Castille Mention-Schaar	Noémie Merlant, Naomi Amarger, Sandrine Bonnaire, Clotilde Courau, Zinedine Soualem		
If You Saw His Heart (Si tu voyais son cœur)	Joan Chemla	Gael García Bernal, Nahuel Pérez Biscayart, Marine Vacth	Drama	
Let the Corpses Tan	Hélène Cattet and Bruno Forzani	Elina Löwensohn, Stephane Ferrara, Bernie Bonvoisin	Western	Belgian-French co-production
The Midwife	Martin Provost	Catherine Frot, Catherine Deneuve		
La Morsure des dieux	Cheyenne Carron	Fleur Geffrier, François Pouron		
Overdrive	Antonio Negret	Scott Eastwood, Freddie Thorp, Ana de Armas		
Paddington 2	Paul King	Hugh Bonneville, Sally Hawkins, Brendan Gleeson		British-France co-production
See You Up There	Albert Dupontel	Albert Dupontel, Nahuel Pérez Biscayart, Laurent Lafitte		
The Square	Ruben Ostlund	Claes Bang, Elisabeth Moss, Dominic West		Swedish-German-French-Danish co-production
Valerian and the City of a Thousand Planets	Luc Besson	Jean-Claude Mézières, Dane DeHaan, Cara Delevingne		
What Happened to Monday	Tommy Wirkola	Noomi Rapace, Willem Dafoe, Glenn Close		British-American-French-Belgian co-production
