= Alice Dufour =

French actress, model and rhythmic gymnast

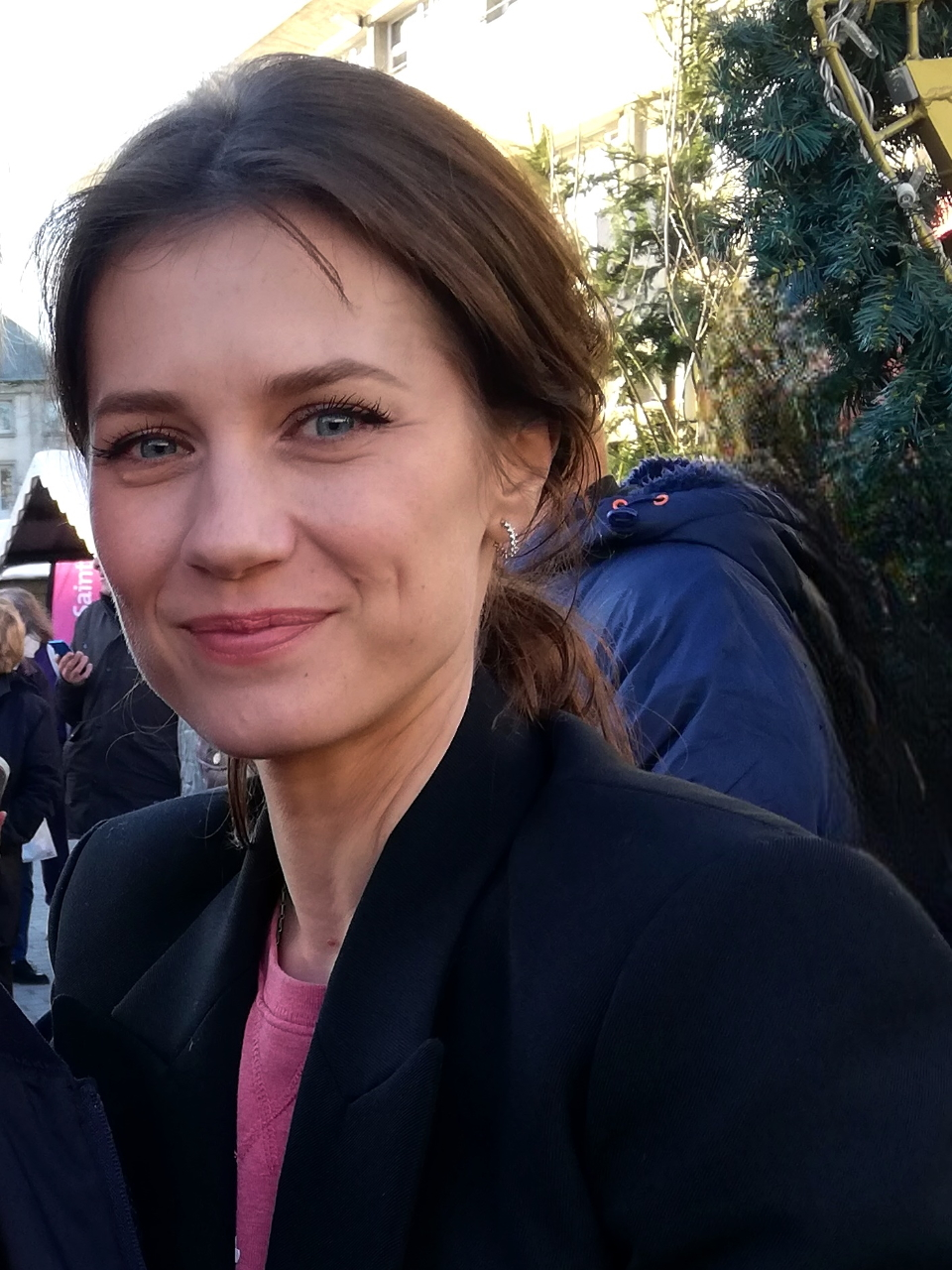
- at the Saint-Lô Christmas market 2025
- Born: 22 February 1987 (age 39); Saint-Lô, France
- Occupations: Actress; model; rhythmic gymnast
- Years active: early 2000s-present
- Known for: Alibi.com, Hard, Alphonse,
- Spouse: François Vincentelli (2015-present)
- Children: 1

Alice Dufour (born 22 February 1987) is a French actress, model and former rhythmic gymnast.

== Biography ==
Dufour took up rhythmic gymnastics at the age of 7 at the Saint-Loise club where she was spotted five years later to join the Orléans pole alongside Eva Serrano. Preferring to return to her club, Alice returned to Saint-Lô the following year and obtained the bronze medal in senior national B in 2007. Under the colors of the Paris Center club, she distinguished herself as senior French national B champion three times in a row in 2008, 2009 and 2010. The French gymnastics federation then chose her as ambassador for the 2011 Montpellier World Championships.

At the same time she started modelling and, in 2007, participated in the fashion show “Who's Next”. She also posed for several advertisements for the brands Playtex, Isotoner, Reebook and appears in a television commercial for Samsung. From 2008 to 2010 she was a dancer at the Crazy Horse in Paris. In 2009, she was featured in the Italian editions of magazines Vanity Fair and Vogue and made her debut as an actress in Beauté fatale and Pigalle, la nuit. That year she also featured in some video clips such as Ton histoire by Isabelle Boulay and Y a comme un hic by Jenifer. In 2010, she posed for Gerimax and Benetton, she also appeared in a video advertisement for the latter. In the same year she appeared in a Française des Jeux' TV commercial and a GMF Internet advertisement.

In 2011 she was selected by Cirque du Soleil to play a role in the new show Iris at the Dolby Theatre in Los Angeles, United States. Four years later she landed a role in the series Hard broadcast on Canal + where she met François Vincentelli, her future lover. In 2017, she starred in the film Alibi.com by Philippe Lacheau.

From 2019, Dufour devoted herself to theater with Let's Make a Dream, followed by The Secretary Bird. She was nominated for the Molières awards in 2019, in the female theatrical revelation category. She played, alone on stage, Fräulein Else by Arthur Schnitzler, at the Théâtre de Poche-Montparnasse, from 1 September 2020 to 3 January 2021.

On 28 December 2021, she gave birth to her first child with partner François Vincentelli.

== Filmography ==
=== Cinema ===
- 2014 : Babysitting
- 2016 : Rouges étaient les lilas
- 2016 : Open at Night
- 2017: Votez pour moi
- 2017: Alibi.com
- 2019: Forte
- 2021: Super-héros malgré lui

=== Short films ===
- "Les Étoiles de Papier"
- "Le Portrait"
- "Féminité"

=== Television ===
- 2013 : Little Murders of Agatha Christie
- 2014 : Marjorie
- 2015 : Hard (season 3)
- 2019 : Un vrai massacre
- 2022 : L'Amour (presque) parfait
- 2023 : Cannes police criminelle (episode 2 Coup de poker)
- 2023 : Alphonse
- 2025 : Montmartre

== Theatre ==
- 2018 : Let's Make a Dream
- 2019 : The Secretary Bird
- 2019 : Sept ans de réflexion
- 2020 : Fräulein Else
- 2023 : Joyeuses Pâques
