= Chantal Ladesou =

French actress, comedian (born 1948)

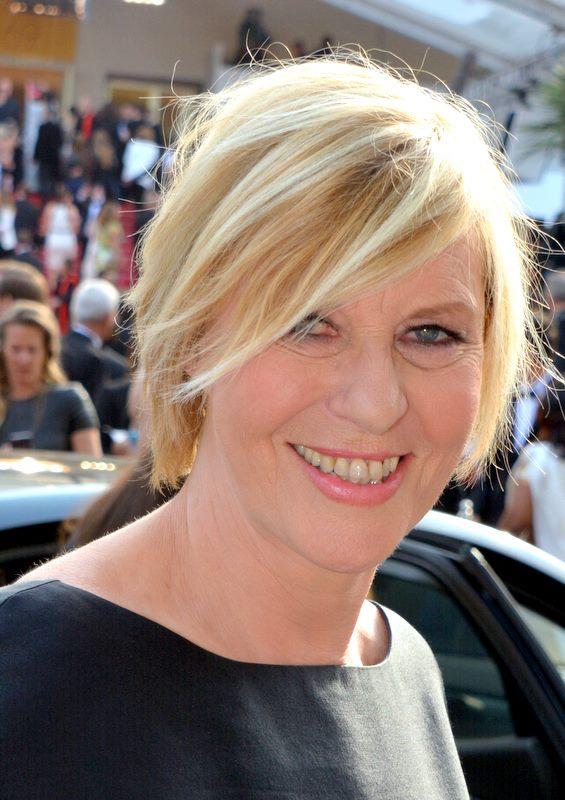
- Chantal Ladesou at the 2016 Cannes Film Festival
- Born: 5 May 1948 (age 78); Roubaix, France
- Years active: 1966–present
- Spouse: Michel Ansault
- Children: 3

Chantal Ladesou (born 5 May 1948) is a French actress and comedian.

== Career ==
She was revealed to the public when participating in the TV Show La Classe in 1987. After the show, she started her career with several one-woman shows.

On the radio, she is a recurring member of the daily comedy programme Les Grosses Têtes, hosted by Laurent Ruquier.

Since 2016, she also has had more important on-screen roles, especially due to the success of the movie We Are Family (2016) and its two sequels : C'est quoi cette mamie ?! (2019) and C'est quoi ce papy ?! (2021). She also frequently works with the younger generation of directors like Philippe Lacheau and Tarek Boudali.

In 2022, she was a judge on the fourth season of Mask Singer.

In June 2023, the press announced that she will play the lead in the TF1 series “Le fil d'Ariane”, where she will play a court reporter.

== Personal life ==
Ladesou met her husband Michel Ansault and with whom she had three children, two boys, Alix (who died in a car accident), Julien and a daughter, the actress Clémence Ansault. Her son Julien Ansault is married to Pauline Lefèvre. She has five grandchildren.

== Theater ==
Year	Title	Author	Director
1973	Les quatre vérités	Marcel Aymé	René Clermont
1989	Apostrophons-nous	Jean Canolle & Jacques Brière	Stéphane Hillel
1990-91	Y’a une femme Lad’sou	Chantal Ladesou	Pierre Palmade
1993	Chantal Ladesou	Chantal Ladesou	François Rollin
1994-95	L'Hôtel du libre échange	Georges Feydeau	Franck de Lapersonne
1996-97	Chantal Ladesou	Chantal Ladesou	François Rollin
1999	Le Père Noël est une ordure	Le Splendid	François Pirette
1999-2001	Ma femme est folle	Jean Barbier	Jean-Pierre Dravel & Olivier Macé
2003	Ainsi soit-il	Jean-François Champion	Jean-Luc Moreau
2003	Chantal Ladesou	Chantal Ladesou	François Rollin
2003-06	Les Amazones	Jean-Marie Chevret	Jean-Pierre Dravel & Olivier Macé
2007	Les Amazones, trois ans après	Jean-Marie Chevret	Jean-Pierre Dravel & Olivier Macé
2008	Oscar	Claude Magnier	Philippe Hersen
2008	Chic et Choc	Chantal Ladesou	Chantal Ladesou
2008	La Dame de chez Maxim	Georges Feydeau	Francis Perrin
2009	Les Précieuses ridicules	Molière	Jean-Paul Bouron
2009	Le Temps des fonctionnaires	Alil Vardar	Alil Vardar
2009-14	J’ai l’impression que je vous plais... Vraiment !	Chantal Ladesou & François Rollin	Éric Carrière, Chantal Ladesou & Xavier Brouard
2011	Les Dégourdis du 101e	André Mouëzy-Éon	Jean-Paul Bouron
2012-13	Adieu je reste!	Isabelle Mergault	Alain Sachs
2014-16	Nelson	Jean-Robert Charrier	Jean-Pierre Dravel & Olivier Macé
2016-17	Peau de Vache !	Pierre Barillet & Jean-Pierre Grédy	Michel Fau
2018-20	On the Road Again	Chantal Ladesou & François Rollin	Chantal Ladesou
2021	Adieu je reste!	Isabelle Mergault	Olivier Macé & Chantal Ladesou
2022-23	1983	Jean-Robert Charrier	Jean-Robert Charrier

== Filmography ==
Year	Title	Role	Director	Notes
1966	Les enquiquineurs		Roland Quignon	
1971	Max et les ferrailleurs		Claude Sautet	
1974	Verdict	A jury	André Cayatte	
1974	The Phantom of Liberty	Toilet paper's woman	Luis Buñuel	
1974	Les maîtresses de vacances	Dancer	Pierre Unia	
1974	Un curé de choc	A prostitute	Philippe Arnal	TV series (1 episode)
1983	Life Is a Bed of Roses		Alain Resnais	
1984	Les Brésiliennes du Bois de Boulogne	A prostitute	Robert Thomas	
1984	La revanche de la planète interdite		Alain Magniette	Short
1985	Maguy	Huguette Boudin	Jean Pignol	TV series (1 episode)
1985	Les Bargeot		Jean-Pierre Barizien	TV series (1 episode)
1986	Le bonheur a encore frappé	Madame Lassouche	Jean-Luc Trotignon	
1986	Affaire suivante	Juliette Laribois	Stéphane Bertin	TV series (1 episode)
1988	Envoyez les violons	The manager	Roger Andrieux	
1989	Tour d'ivoire		Dominique Belet	Short
1991	Une époque formidable...	The nurse	Gérard Jugnot	
1993	Télé-carton		Gil Lefauconnier & Isabelle Salvini	Short
1993	Piège à sons		Philippe Dorison	Short
1994	La rêverie ou le mariage de Sylvia	ANPE's employee	Jean-Luc Trotignon	TV movie
1995	Comment devenir cinéaste sans se prendre la tête	Madame Bessonet	Jacques Rozier	Short
1997	Jeunesse	Jeanne	Noël Alpi	
1998	Une grosse bouchée d'amour	Thérèse	Michaëla Watteaux	TV movie
2003	Les gaous		Igor Sekulic	
2003	The Car Keys	The bank teller	Laurent Baffie	
2004	People	Jet-setter in rehab	Fabien Onteniente	
2005	Plus jamais comme ça	Voice	Jean-Luc Trotignon	TV series (1 episode)
2006	Les aristos	Hostess	Charlotte de Turckheim	
2006	Le ciel sur la tête	Nicole	Régis Musset	TV movie
2006	Une journée dehouf	Madame Peck	Francis Duquet	TV series (6 episodes)
2008	Number One	Mademoiselle Morel	Zakia Tahri	
2008	Belleville tour	Marie-Claude	Ahmed Bouchaala & Zakia Tahri	TV movie
2008	Palizzi		Serge Hazanavicius	TV series (1 episode)
2009	Camping paradis	Odette	Philippe Proteau	TV series (1 episode)
2010	Le grand ménage	Odile	Régis Musset	TV movie
2010	Au siècle de Maupassant	Babette	Claude Chabrol	TV series (1 episode)
2011	Marh'ba		Ahmed Bouchaala & Zakia Tahri	
2011	Les recalés du permis	Judith	Olivier Belmondo & Lucas Rue	Short
2011	Ferme les yeux	Rita	Pierre Noguéras	Short
2012	Lili David	M'ma Dalton	Christophe Barraud	TV movie
2012	Big & Tasty	Cougar Client	Loïc Trudelle	Music video
2013	The Ultimate Accessory	Danielle	Valérie Lemercier	
2013	Super Lola	Françoise	Régis Musset	TV movie
2013	La grande peinture	Elisabeth	Laurent Heynemann	TV movie
2013	Scènes de ménages	Didi La Plume	Francis Duquet	TV series (1 episode)
2013	C'est la crise	Grandma Chantalou	David Freymond	TV series (3 episodes)
2014	Marbie, star de Couillu-Les-2-Eglises	The medium	Dominique Smeets	
2015	Love Race	The Bartender	Antoine Julien Ansault	Short
2016	We Are Family	Aurore	Gabriel Julien-Laferrière	
2017	Alibi.com	The veterinarian	Philippe Lacheau	
2017	Bonne Pomme	Mémé Morillon	Florence Quentin	
2017	Everyone's Life	The tax inspector	Claude Lelouch	
2018	Les déguns	Christiane	Cyrille Droux & Claude Zidi Jr.	
2018	Lumière noire	Evelyne	Enguerrand Jouvin	
2018	Comment tuer sa mère	Madame Mauret	David Diane & Morgan Spillemaecker	
2018	Nicky Larson et le parfum de Cupidon	Gilbert's mother-in-law	Philippe Lacheau	
2018	L'âge dort	Yolanda	Paolo Cedolin Petrini	Short
2019	C'est quoi cette mamie?!	Aurore	Gabriel Julien-Laferrière	
2019	Les municipaux - Trop c'est trop	Mademoiselle Legrand	Les Chevaliers du fiel	
2020	30 jours max	The prostitute	Tarek Boudali	
2020	I Love You Coiffure	The woman on the road	Muriel Robin	TV movie
2020	Il était une fois à Monaco	Countess Lorentzen	Frédéric Forestier	TV movie
2020	Big Five	Grandma Rose	Gilles de Maistre	TV series (1 episode)
2021	C'est quoi ce papy?!	Aurore	Gabriel Julien-Laferrière	
2021	Super-héros malgré lui	The producer	Philippe Lacheau	
2021	Le Grand Restaurant 3	Bernard/Christine	Romuald Boulanger & Pierre Palmade	TV movie
2021	Profession comédien	Herself	Bertrand Uzeel	TV series (1 episode)
2021	Sam	Anne-Marie	Philippe Lefebvre	TV series (8 episodes)
2022	Tous Inconnus	Herself	Nicolas Hourès	TV movie
2023	3 jours max	Pierre's mother	Tarek Boudali	
2023	Jeff Panacloc : À la poursuite de Jean-Marc		Pierre-François Martin-Laval	Post-Production
2023	Un gars, une fille (au pluriel)	The woman	Sylvain Fusée	TV series (1 episode)
2024	Chasse gardée	The real estate	Frédéric Forestier & Antonin Fourlon	Post-Production
2024	Maison de retraite 2		Claude Zidi Jr.	Post-Production
2024	Le Fil d'Ariane	Ariane Legrand	Jason Roffé	Post-Production; TV series

== Television ==
Year	Program	Role	Notes
1987-1990	La Classe	Comedian	
2022	Mask Singer	Judge	Season 4
