= List of 2017 box office number-one films in France =

The following is a list of 2017 box office number-one films in France. Screen Daily described the year as "fairly typical" for the French box office, noting that like the previous five years, the top 20 was dominated by American made, family-oriented animated features including Despicable Me 3, The Boss Baby and Sing as well as mainstream French comedies (Alibi.com and Raid dingue) and Hollywood franchises such as Pirates Of The Caribbean, Star Wars and Guardians of the Galaxy.

Screen Daily declared the only film to buck a world-wide trend in the box-office was Valerian and the City of a Thousand Planets making it one of the most popular releases of the year drawing four million spectators for a gross of $30.4 million. The film still was still not as popular as Besson's most successful French releases to date, The Big Blue, which generated nine million admissions, and The Fifth Element, which drew seven million spectators.

#	Date	Film	Gross	Notes
1	8 January 2017	Rogue One: A Star Wars Story	US$2.48 million	
2	15 January 2017	The Great Wall	US$2.34 million	
3	18 January 2017	xXx: The Return of Xander Cage	US$3.18 million	
4	25 January 2017	Sing	US$4.55 million	
5	1 February 2017	Raid dingue	US$8.65 million	
6	8 February 2017	Fifty Shades Darker	US$8.2 million	
7	15 February 2017	Alibi.com	US$6.23 million	
8	22 February 2017	Alibi.com	US$4.77 million	
9	1 March 2017	Logan	US$5.92 million	
10	8 March 2017	Kong: Skull Island	US$3.92 million	
11	15 March 2017	Kong: Skull Island	US$2.89 million	
12	22 March 2017	Beauty and the Beast	US$7.71 million	
13	29 March 2017	The Boss Baby	US$5.54 million	
14	5 April 2017	The Boss Baby	US$3.07 million	
15	12 April 2017	The Fate of the Furious	US$10.56 million	
16	26 April 2017	Guardians of the Galaxy Vol. 2	US$7.94 million	
17	3 May 2017	Guardians of the Galaxy Vol. 2	US$5.04 million	
18	10 May 2017	Alien: Covenant	US$4.43 million	
19	17 May 2017	King Arthur: Legend of the Sword	US$2.35 million	
21	31 May 2017	Pirates of the Caribbean: Dead Men Tell No Tales	US$5.09 million	
22	7 June 2017	Wonder Woman	US$4.6 million	
23	14 June 2017	The Mummy	US$3.28 million	
24	14 June 2017	Baywatch	US$2.64 million	
25	28 June 2017	Transformers: The Last Knight	US$2.64 million	
26	5 July 2017	Despicable Me 3	US$11.42 million	
27	12 July 2017	Spider-Man: Homecoming	US$6.33 million	
28	19 July 2017	Dunkirk	US$5.57 million	
29	26 July 2017	Valerian and the City of a Thousand Planets	US$12.21 million	
30	2 August 2017	War for the Planet of the Apes	US$7.33 million	
33	16 August 2017	War for the Planet of the Apes	US$2.57 million	
34	23 August 2017	Valerian and the City of a Thousand Planets	US$1.75 million	
35	30 August 2017	What Happened to Monday	US$3.94 million	
36	6 September 2017	What Happened to Monday	US$2.49 million	
37	6 September 2017	American Made	US$1.75 million	
38	20 September 2017	It	US$6.54 million	
39	27 September 2017	It	US$4.12 million	
40	4 October 2017	C'est la vie!	US$5.20 million	
41	11 October 2017	Kingsman: The Golden Circle	US$4.56 million	
42	18 October 2017	Kingsman: The Golden Circle	US$2.98 million	
43	25 October 2017	Thor: Ragnarok	US$7.71 million	
44	1 November 2017	Thor: Ragnarok	US$5.41 million	
45	8 November 2017	Épouse-moi mon pote	US$2.4 million	
46	15 November 2017	Justice League	US$5.89 million	
47	22 November 2017	Justice League	US$2.96 million	
48	29 November 2017	Coco	US$5.32 million	
49	6 December 2017	Santa & Cie	US$4.16 million	
50	13 December 2017	Star Wars: The Last Jedi	US$18.82 million	
51	20 December 2017	Star Wars: The Last Jedi	US$8.08 million	
