= Norman Thavaud =

French comedian and YouTuber (born 1987)

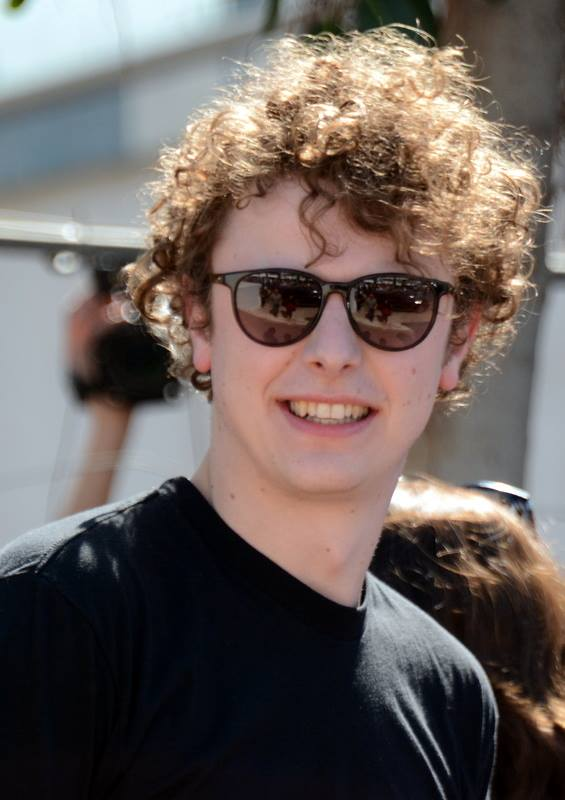
- Thavaud at the 2015 Cannes Film Festival
- Born: Norman Jacky Cyril Thavaud; 14 April 1987 (age 38); Arras, France
- Occupation: Internet personality

YouTube information
- Channel: Norman
- Years active: 2011–2022; 2024-present
- Genre: Comedy
- Subscribers: 11.4 million
- Views: 2.7 billion
- Last updated: February 9, 2025

Norman Jacky Cyril Thavaud (French pronunciation: [nɔʁman ʒaki siʁil tavo]; born 14 April 1987) also known by his channel name Norman fait des vidéos (Norman makes videos), is a French comedian and blogger known for his short comic YouTube videos. Several of his videos have been viewed tens of millions of times.

== Biography ==
=== Youth ===
Norman was born on 14 April 1987 in Arras, France. His mother was a history and geography teacher and his father, Jackie Thavaud, was a culture promoter and head of a local cinema school. As a child, Norman played the saxophone for seven years in a conservatory. He also made numerous videos using his father's camera. Having gained his high school baccalaureate in 2005, Norman moved to Paris in order to study cinema. He had a succession of jobs before becoming a video montage specialist.

=== Le Velcrou ===
Norman met Hugo Dessioux (alias Hugo tout seul) at college and they formed the "Le Velcrou" comedic group in March 2008. "Le Velcrou" regularly posted comical videos on the Dailymotion website. Four months later, Marc Jarousseau (alias Kemar), a friend from university, joined the team.

Thanks to Le Velcrou, Norman met Cyprien Iov (alias Monsieur Dream), another video blogger, who appeared in a few of Le Velcrou's videos. In December of the same year, Cyprien created "Super Mega Noël", a short humorous film about Christmas. Cyprien featured other bloggers in his work, including Hugo and Norman.

In July 2009, Norman was awarded a degree in cinematography from University Paris-1 Panthéon-Sorbonne. Le Velcrou broke up in October 2010. Since then, the group's former members have been producing solo videos.

=== Increasing popularity ===
At the end of 2010, Norman launched a new format: short video sequences of about 4 minutes long, in which he embodied "mister average" and dealt with daily life subjects, as seen in his first one-man video titled "Table tennis club". His account was created on January 3, 2011. Two months later, he posted what became at the time his most popular video, "The bilinguals", marking the beginning of his notoriety. It was subsequently surpassed in views by the "Now, I have Google" video, among others. "Luigi Clash Mario" is today his most viewed video, with over 86 million views as of March, 2021. Norman records his videos in his Parisian flat where he lives with his flatmate and his two cats (Sergi, who often appears in his videos, and Becassine).

His videos have been viewed billions of times, enabling him to be paid by the YouTube internet website and to attract national media attention. Several media outlets have called him a "web phenomenon", including reporter Eric Loret who described Norman and his partners, Cyprien and Hugo Dessioux (who have launched the same format as Norman), as having the advantage of being "young artists who are really good at business and communication, able to manage all strategic decisions with the biggest candour."

As an internet star and the second biggest French YouTuber, Norman has been invited by video makers and internet friends to collaborate. He participates in the one-man videos of the former members of his group, Hugo Dessioux and Marc Jarousseau, on their YouTube channels. Cyprien, the best known French YouTuber in terms of number of subscribers has invited Norman to participate in only one of his videos, even though they performed together as part of Le Velcrou.

Norman has also appeared on TV, taking part in several episodes of Very Bad Plagues by the Palmashow. The Palmashow are a comic duo, composed of Grégoire Ludig and David Marsais, who also originated on the internet but now broadcast their sketches on the D8 TV channel. In December 2011, Norman was invited to the Les Arcs European Film Festival with other YouTube stars such as La Ferme Jerome, Cyprien, Maxime Musqua, Mistertel, as well as the Palmashow. On 12 January 2012, Norman organized Zapping Amazing, a show at the Grand Rex (a major venue in Paris) in which he gathered some web-comedy friends with whom he has performed (Palmashow, Kemar, Cyprien, PV Nova, Julfou, Mister V, Volt, Backstage Rodeo, LeGrandJD, Spicy Marguerites and La Ferme Jerome). The comedians re-aired some of their most famous sketches for the audience. The show (which attracted almost 3000 people) was so successful that a tour was scheduled in France from 5 February 2013 to 15 February 2013.

He often works with Yvick Letexier, Cyprien Iov, and Hugo Dessioux.

=== Accusations of sexual harassment and rape ===
In 2018, several testimonies were made against Thavaud regarding a potential sexual harassment. In 2020, a Quebecois woman accused him of having asked her for sexual photographs in an increasingly insistent manner when she was 16 and he was 30. She announced that she had filed a complaint in Canada against Norman for "luring a child and sexual exploitation of minors" and that she had forwarded all the messages and photographs exchanged with the video artist to the police. Thavaud's press attaché refuted the accusations, but confirmed that exchanges had taken place.

In January 2022, the public prosecutor's office in Paris launched an investigation concerning "six complainants". All of them had filed complaints, five of them for rape, with two of them being minors at the time of the events. On 5 December 2022, Thavaud was placed into custody for 36 hours as part of a preliminary investigation for rape and corruption of minors. The investigation was entrusted to a brigade specialized in the protection of minors. After the announcement of his arrest, production company Webedia announced the suspension of its collaboration with Thavaud. On 10 December, YouTube announced that Norman's videos had been demonetized following these accusations.

Thavaud told the investigators that he had received "death threats, hordes of insults and cyber harassment" since the media coverage of the case began.

== Filmography ==
Year	Title	Role	Director	Notes
2009	Manger une banane ne tue pas	Charles	Rémi Forte	Short
2013	Pas très normales activités	Octave Blin	Maurice Barthélemy	
2013	Super Social Movie	Norman / Namron	Morgan Prêleur & Rémi Sello	Short; Also Writer
2014	Le fantôme de merde	Bad ghost	Raphaël Descraques	Short
2014	Scènes de ménages	The young owner	Francis Duquet	TV series (1 episode)
2015	Mon roi	Nico	Maïwenn	
2015	Peplum	The messenger	Philippe Lefebvre	TV series (1 episode)
2017	Alibi.com	Paul-Edouard	Philippe Lacheau	
2017	Call My Agent!	Himself	Antoine Garceau	TV series (1 episode)
2020	Ducobu 3	Willie's father	Élie Semoun	
