= Élodie Fontan =

French actress

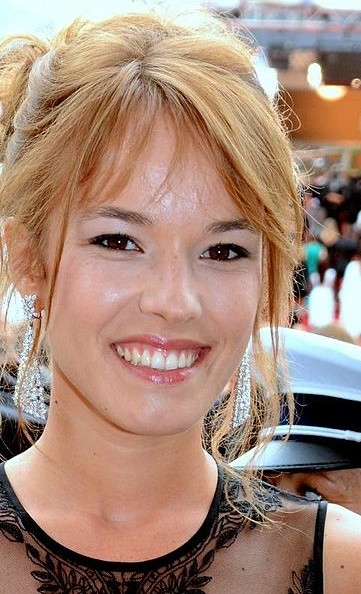
- Élodie Fontan at the 2014 Cannes Film Festival
- Born: 9 July 1987 (age 39); Bondy, Seine-Saint-Denis, France
- Occupation: Actress
- Years active: 1996 – present

Élodie Fontan (French pronunciation: [elɔdi fɔ̃tɑ̃]; born 9 July 1987) is a French actress. She has appeared in more than fifteen television and film productions since 1996.

== Life and career ==
Élodie Fontan started very young in French commercials for Nissan, Quick and Euro Disney. She gained notoriety in 2009 by playing Alyzée, Clem's best friend, in the Clem series, broadcast on TF1. In 2014, she joined the cast of the comedy Serial (Bad) Weddings alongside Chantal Lauby and Christian Clavier.

She is part of La Bande à Fifi, a French comedy troupe bringing together Philippe Lacheau, Élodie Fontan, Tarek Boudali, Reem Kherici and Julien Arruti.

She joined in 2018 the group of Les Enfoirés.

Since 2016, she has been in a relationship with Philippe Lacheau.

In early 2019, she returned to Philippe de Chauveron's sequel Qu'est-ce qu'on a encore fait au Bon Dieu? That same year, she was the heroine of the mini-series Prise au piège, broadcast in the first half of the evening on M6, which gave her a dramatic role. This is the French adaptation of the Spanish series Vis à vis, created by Álex Pina. The program tells the story of a young woman who finds herself in prison after being accused of homicide, even though she is innocent.

== Filmography ==
=== Feature films ===
Year	Title	Role	Director	Notes
1996	The Best Job in the World	Fanny	Gérard Lauzier	
2014	Serial (Bad) Weddings	Laure Verneuil	Philippe de Chauveron	
2015	Babysitting 2	Julie	Nicolas Benamou & Philippe Lacheau	
2016	Venise sous la neige	Nathalie	Elliott Covrigaru	
2017	Alibi.com	Florence Martin	Philippe Lacheau	
2017	Mission Pays basque	Sibylle Garnier	Ludovic Bernard	
2018	Peter Rabbit	Flopsy Rabbit	Will Gluck	French voice
2019	Nicky Larson et le parfum de Cupidon	Laura Marconi	Philippe Lacheau	
2019	Serial (Bad) Weddings 2	Laure Verneuil	Philippe de Chauveron	
2021	Super-héros malgré lui	Éléonore Dugimont	Philippe Lacheau	
2023	Alibi.com 2	Flo Martin		

=== Television ===
Year	Title	Role	Notes
1997	La Croisière foll'amour	Strellina	TV series (25 episodes)
1998	Meurtres sans risques	Tiphanie Gallais	TV movie
2004	K.ça	Véro	TV series
2005	Sois le meilleur	Anne-Sophie	TV movie
2006	Boulevard du Palais	Lisa Viannet	TV series - Season 8 Episode 5
2007	Marie Humbert, le secret d'une mère	Estelle	TV movie
2007	R.I.S, police scientifique	Lisa Berthier	TV series - Season 2 Episode 10
2007	Brigade Navarro	Élodie Revault	TV series - Season 1 Episode 2
2008	Marie et Madeleine	Marie	TV movie
2008	Pas de secrets entre nous	Vanessa	TV series (4 episodes)
2008	Paris enquêtes criminelles	Claire Beaupré	TV series - Season 3 Episode 4
2008	Seconde chance	Aona	TV series (13 episodes)
2009	Femmes de loi	Aurore	TV series - Season 8 Episode 7
2010-2019	Clem	Alyzée Bertier	TV series(48 episodes)
2010	Josephine, Guardian Angel	Alexandra	TV series - Season 12 Episode 12
2011	Le Jour où tout a basculé	Lisa Viannet	Scripted reality - Season 1 Episode 52
2013	Le Jour où tout a basculé	Sandra Buchet	Scripted reality - Episode Harassment at work
2014	R.I.S, police scientifique	Cécile Carrera	TV series - Season 9 Episode 6
2014	Duel au soleil	Peggy	TV series - Season 1 Episode 2
2015	Un parfum de sang	Vanessa	TV movie
2016	Starmen	San	Miniseries
2019	Prise au piège	Anna Rivière	TV series (6 episodes)
2020	Meurtres en Pays Cathare	Pauline Franchet	TV movie
2020	Big Five	Catherine Raimbaud	TV series- Episode Le Plus Beau des Noëls
2024-present	Cat's Eyes	Prudence	TV series
