= Nicky Larson et le parfum de Cupidon =

French crime comedy film

- Theatrical release poster
- Directed by: Philippe Lacheau
- Written by: Julien Arruti; Philippe Lacheau; Pierre Lacheau
- Based on: City Hunter by Tsukasa Hojo
- Produced by: Christophe Cervoni; Marc Fiszman
- Starring: Philippe Lacheau; Élodie Fontan; Tarek Boudali; Didier Bourdon; Pamela Anderson
- Music by: Michael Tordjman; Maxime Desprez
- Production companies: Les Films du 24; Axel Films
- Distributed by: Sony Pictures Releasing
- Release dates: 15 December 2018 (premiere); 6 February 2019
- Running time: 91 minutes
- Country: France
- Language: French
- Box office: $14.7 million

Nicky Larson et le parfum de Cupidon (French pronunciation: [niki laʁsɔn e lə paʁfœ̃ də kypidɔ̃]; lit. 'Nicky Larson and Cupid's Perfume'; also known as City Hunter) is a 2018 French action comedy film directed by Philippe Lacheau who also co-wrote the screenplay with Julien Arruti and Pierre Lacheau. It is an adaptation of the Japanese manga and anime series City Hunter (known as Nicky Larson in France) by Tsukasa Hojo, who agreed to the adaptation after reading the script. The film stars Lacheau, Élodie Fontan, Tarek Boudali and Julien Arruti in lead roles, along with Didier Bourdon, Kamel Guenfoud, Sophie Mousel and Pamela Anderson in supporting roles. It was released on 6 February 2019.

== Synopsis ==
Nicky Larson is an unusual private investigator, a talented street fighter, and a sniper that is often called on to solve problems that no one can solve. Aided by his partner Laura, he offers multiple services to his customers, more or less dangerous. But, as professional and famous as he is, he has a major flaw: his particularly exacerbated penchant for the fairer sex, which poses a lot of worries to Laura.

One of his clients entrusts him with a mission to protect "Cupid's perfume", a fragrance that makes anyone who wears it absolutely irresistible. But a moment of distraction on Larson's part allow thugs to seize it. Nicky Larson must then recover the perfume, which involves a trip to Monaco.

== Cast ==
The characters are named as they are known in the French dubbed version of the anime series, while the Japanese dubbed version of the film uses their original names.

- Philippe Lacheau as Nicky Larson (Ryo Saeba)
- Élodie Fontan as Laura Marconi (Kaori Makimura)
- Tarek Boudali as Poncho
- Julien Arruti as Gilbert Skippy
- Didier Bourdon as Dominique Lettelier
- Kamel Guenfoud as Mammouth (Umibozu)
- Sophie Mousel as Hélène Lamberti (Saeko Nogami)
- Raphaël Personnaz as Tony Marconi (Hideyuki Makimura)
- Pamela Anderson as Jessica Fox
- Gérard Jugnot as the psychologist
- Chantal Ladesou as Gilbert's mother-in-law
- Audrey Lamy as Gilbert's wife
- Jarry as the mayor Mokkori
- Reem Kherici as the tattooed girl
- Pascal Boisson as Paco
- Jérôme Le Banner as Joe
- Arben Bajraktaraj as Black Gloves
- Achille Potier as Jordan, Gilbert's son
- Elisa Bachir Bey as a model
- Adja Kaba as a model
- Noémie Demeule as a model
- Liya Kebede as the professor's daughter
- Dorothée as a stewardess (cameo appearance)
- Jean-Paul Césari as the singer at the Fashion Police party (cameo appearance)
- Vincent Ropion as the television reporter (cameo appearance)
- Medi Sadoun as the lie detector inspector (cameo appearance)

== Promotion ==
At the Comic Con Paris in October 2018, it was revealed that Jean-Paul Césari and Vincent Ropion would make cameos in the film. The first being the interpreter of the French credits song of the animated series while the second is the French voice of the main character.

== Release ==
Nicky Larson et le parfum de Cupidon was previewed over most of France on 15 December 2018, before its national release on 6 February 2019, the same in Switzerland. 13 February 2019, the film was released in Belgium, on 14 March 2019 in Thailand and on 23 May 2019 in Russia under the title Undercover Playboy. The film debuted in Japan on 29 November 2019 as City Hunter the Movie: Shijōsaikō no Mission (シティーハンター THE MOVIE 史上最香のミッション; City Hunter the Movie: The Greatest Mission Ever).

=== Box office ===
The film debuted at #3 in France, with an opening weekend gross of €3,111,807 ($3,515,249). In France, the film sold more than 1 million tickets and grossed €8,817,024 ($10,031,595) by 24 February 2019. As of 31 March 2019, the film has sold 1,684,350 tickets and grossed $12,898,742 in France.

The film released in Japan on 29 November 2019, debuting at #8 and grossing ¥47,883,700 from 38,676 admissions in its first three days. As of 15 December 2019, the film has grossed ¥144,586,600 ($1,321,874) in Japan. In total, the film has sold 1,903,808 tickets and grossed $14,702,744 worldwide, as of 15 December 2019.

=== Reception ===
On December 14, 2018, the day before the premiere, Simon Riaux, in his review for Écran large, wrote: ... "the film sends a handful of sometimes hilarious images, sometimes imbued with unexpected prettiness (...) in subjective vision in quilted pursuit", but "the story manages to hold an astonishing harmony between pastiche and first degree. (...) The dialogues appear more than once as the main weak point of the team". Frédéric Mignard from Avoir-alire admits that it is "probably the most sympathetic film of its author since the Babysittings, far from the recent shipwrecks in comic strip adaptation, like that of Gaston Lagaffe. (...) To tell the truth, the misunderstandings gags and the astonishing situations are typical of the work of Lacheau (...) and as one is never bored nor has the impression of wasting his time, one mays pardon him his few artistic wanderings."

On the other side, Alexandre Lazerges of GQ wrote that "Philippe Lacheau is worse than Qu'est-ce qu'on a encore fait au Bon Dieu?, destroying a cult manga despite the presence of Pamela Anderson and Dorothée"

== See also ==
- City Hunter
