= Babysitting 2 =

- Theatrical release poster
- Directed by: Nicolas Benamou; Philippe Lacheau
- Written by: Julien Arruti; Nicolas Benamou; Philippe Lacheau; Pierre Lacheau
- Produced by: Christophe Cervoni; Marc Fiszman
- Starring: Philippe Lacheau; Alice David; Vincent Desagnat
- Cinematography: Antoine Marteau
- Edited by: Olivier Michaut-Alchourroun
- Music by: Maxime Desprez; Michael Tordjman
- Production companies: Axel Films; Madame Films; Cinéfrance 1888; M6 Films
- Distributed by: Universal Pictures International France
- Release date: 2 December 2015
- Running time: 93 minutes
- Country: France
- Language: French
- Budget: $10.8 million
- Box office: $24.6 million

Babysitting 2 is a 2015 French comedy film shot in the "found footage" style. It is directed by Nicolas Benamou and Philippe Lacheau. The film is the sequel to Babysitting.

== Cast ==
- Philippe Lacheau as Franck
- Alice David as Sonia
- Vincent Desagnat as Ernest
- Tarek Boudali as Sam
- Valériane de Villeneuve as Yolande
- Julien Arruti as Alex
- Charlotte Gabris]as Estelle
- Grégoire Ludig as Paul
- David Marsais as Jean
- Christian Clavier as Alain
- Jérôme Commandeur as Michel Massieye
- Valérie Karsenti as Madame Massieye
- Élodie Fontan as Julie
- Jean-Luc Couchard as Marco
- Elisa Bachir Bey as Erika
- Joséphine Drai as Joséphine
- Ken Samuels as John
- Aílton Carmo as Pedro
- Beto Benites as The chief of rescue workers
- Luis Eduardo dos Reis Pachêco as Joao
