= We Are Family (2016 film) =

2016 comedy film by Gabriel Julien-Laferrière

- Theatrical release poster
- C'est quoi cette famille ?!
- Directed by: Gabriel Julien-Laferrière
- Written by: Camille Moreau; Olivier Treiner; François Desagnat(collaboration); Romain Protat(collaboration)
- Produced by: Yves Darondeau; Christophe Lioud; Emmanuel Priou; Jean-Michel Rey
- Starring: Julie Gayet; Thierry Neuvic; Julie Depardieu
- Cinematography: Cyrill Renaud
- Edited by: Thomas Béard
- Music by: Da Silva Fortuny; Frédéric Fortuny
- Production companies: Bonne Pioche Cinéma; Rezo Productions
- Distributed by: UGC Distribution
- Release date: 10 August 2016
- Running time: 99 minutes
- Country: France
- Language: French
- Budget: $7 million
- Box office: $5.8 million

We Are Family (original title: C'est quoi cette famille ?!) is a 2016 French comedy film directed by Gabriel Julien-Laferrière.

== Plot ==
The family of thirteen-year-old Bastien is anything but conventional. With several marriages and divorces of both parents, Bastien found himself caught in the middle of "a number of parents" and many other half-siblings. This means many bedrooms where he and other kids spend a few nights before packing up and moving to another parent's home. But Bastien has had enough of the arrangement. Eventually he comes up with an innovative idea where the kids will live together in one place and it will now be the adults who are doing the weekly rotations.

== Cast ==
=== Grandparents ===
- Chantal Ladesou: Aurore, the mother of Sophie and Agnès, and the grandmother of Bastien, Clara, Gulliver, Léopoldine and Juliette

=== Parents ===
- Julie Gayet: Sophie, the daughter of Aurore, the sister of Agnès, and the mother of Bastien, Clara and Gulliver
  - Thierry Neuvic : Philippe, the first husband of Sophie, and the father of Bastien and Oscar
    - Nino Kirtadze: Mavonderine, the ex-wife of Philippe, and the mother of Oscar
  - Philippe Katerine: Claude, the second husband of Sophie, and the father of Clara
  - Lucien Jean-Baptiste: Hugo, the third husband of Sophie, and the father of Gulliver and of Eliott
    - Claudia Tagbo: Babette, the ex-wife of Hugo, and the mother of Eliott
- Julie Depardieu: Agnès, the daughter of Aurore, the sister of Sophie, and the mother of Léopoldine and Juliette
  - Arié Elmatheh: Paul, the first husband of Agnès, and the father of Léopoldine

=== Children ===
- Lilian Dugois: Oscar, the son of Mavonderine and Philippe
- Teïlo Azaïs: Bastien, the son of Sophie and Philippe
- Violette Guillon: Clara, the daughter of Sophie and Claude
- Sadio Diallo: Gulliver, the son of Sophie and Hugo
- Benjamin Douba-Paris: Eliott, the son of Babette and Hugo
- Luna Aglat: Léopoldine, the daughter of Agnès and Paul
- Chann Aglat: Juliette, the daughter of Agnès

=== Others ===
- Antoine Khorsand: Best friend of Bastien
- Louvia Bachelier: Alice, the friend of Bastien
- Caterina Murino: Marie, the mother of Alice
- Serge Onteniente: Victor, the neighbour
- Alain de Catuela: Apartment buyer
- Cécithe Rebboah: Teacher of Gulliver
- Olivier de Benoist: Friend of Babette
- Manon Bresch: Friend of Oscar

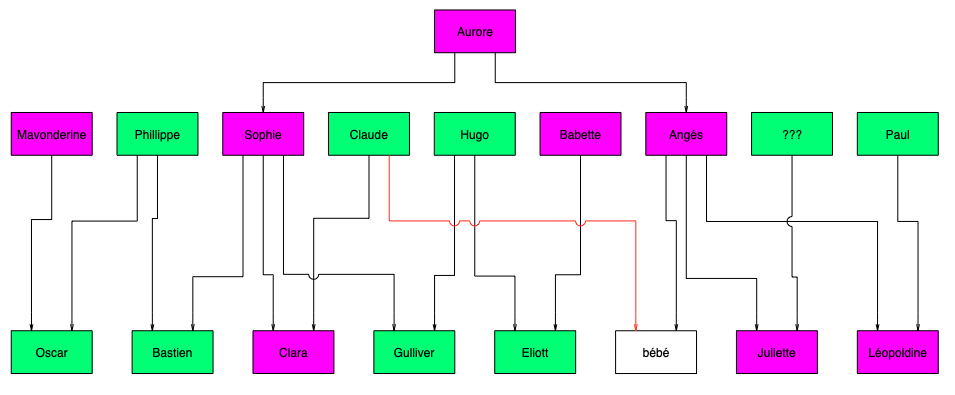
Family tree
