= Hard (TV series) =

- Created by: Cathy Verney
- Starring: Natacha Lindinger; Michèle Moretti; François Vincentelli
- Country of origin: France
- No. of seasons: 3
- No. of episodes: 30 (list of episodes)

Production
- Producers: Bruno Gaccio; Gilles Galud
- Running time: 26 minutes/episode

Original release
- Network: Canal+
- Release: 9 May 2008 – 6 July 2015

Hard is a French television series created and produced by Cathy Verney, airing since 9 May 2008 on Canal+ in France, and later internationally. The series focuses on the pornographic movie industry. It is part of the "New Trilogy" collection on Canal+.

== Synopsis ==
After the sudden death of her husband, Sophie discovers through her mother-in-law, that her late husband did not run a successful software company, but instead produced pornographic films, with Soph'X being the legacy.

Bewildered and dismayed, at discovering a world she could not conceive of in a thousand years, she hesitates between taking over the company or selling everything to resume her job as a lawyer. To pay the mortgage held by her husband before his death, she has to decide to modernize Soph'X, until a meeting with porn star and pillar of the company, Roy Lapoutre, forces her hand.

== Cast ==
=== Recurring ===
- Natacha Lindinger as Sophie
- François Vincentelli as Jean-Marc Danel / Roy Lapoutre
- Stéphan Wojtowicz as Pierre
- Charlie Dupont as Corrado
- Anne Caillon as Mathilde
- Claire Dumas & Alice Dufour as Joujou
- Cedric Chevalme as Rudy
- Jean-Noël Cnokaert as Philippe Boule
- Axel Wursten as Jules
- Jonathan Cohen as Vikash
- Corinne Masiero as Sonia
- Fanny Sidney as Violette
- Mehdi Nebbou as Rémi Capelle
- Michèle Moretti as Louise
- Claire Nadeau as Anne-Marie Teissere
- Valérie Kéruzoré as Armelle
- Michèle Laroque as Madeleine Fournier

=== Guest ===
- Anne Benoît as Madame Martel
- Cécile de France as Herself
- Denis Podalydès as Himself
- Élisabeth Margoni as Nadine
- Elli Medeiros as Eve
- François Civil as Tony
- Françoise Lépine as Françoise
- Guillaume Gallienne as Himself
- Lyes Salem as Henri Sainte-Rose
- Philippe Nahon as Daniel
- Philippe Rebbot as Nathaniel Micheletty
- Thomas Coumans

== Episodes ==
- Season 1 originally aired from 9 to 23 May 2008, over 6 episodes of 26 minutes.
- Season 2 originally aired from 30 May to 20 June 2011, over 12 episodes of 26 minutes.
- Season 3 originally aired from 1 June to 6 July 2015, over 12 episodes of 26 minutes.

== International distribution ==
The first season of the series was also broadcast in Hungary late 2010 under the title Derült égből porn, on the channel HBO Magyarország. It was proposed as a TV movie in two parts, the first lasting 74 minutes and the second lasting 78 minutes. Sky Arts started airing the first series in July 2013.

In 2016, SBS2 began airing the show weekly in Australia (with subtitles), starting with Season 3 and beginning with an introductory airing of three episodes consecutively on one night. SBS also offered the whole season available to stream on their website for Australian audiences. So far there are no announcements made as to whether or not they will air the first two seasons.

== Brazilian remake and HBO Max ==
In 2020, HBO Latin America produced a Brazilian remake of the original French series. The remake is available for streaming in the United States on HBO Max.
