= Alice David =

French actress (born 1987)

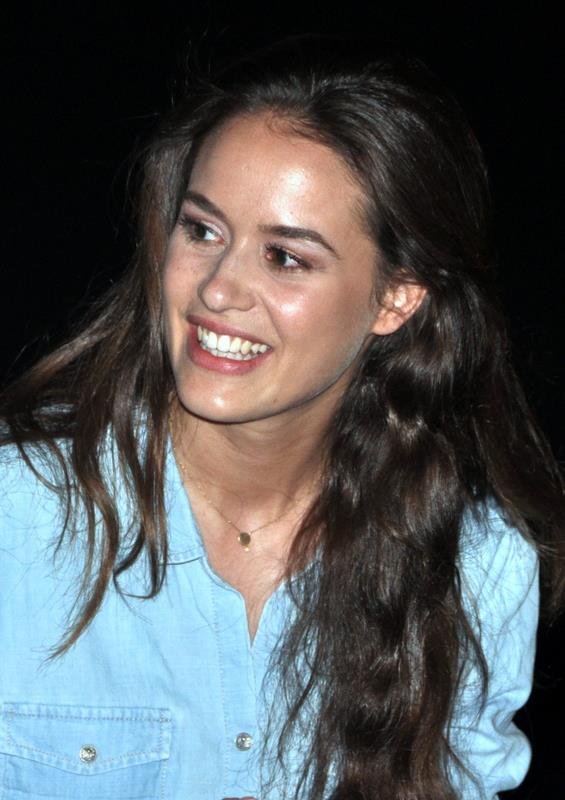
- Alice David in 2013
- Born: 22 March 1987 (age 38); Paris, France
- Occupation: Actress

Alice David (born 22 March 1987) is a French actress, known for the television series Bref (2011) and the film Babysitting (2014). She is the voice of the French dub of Lara Croft in the video game Tomb Raider.

== Filmography ==
Year	Title	Role	Notes
2007	Will You Be There?	Lisa adolescente	TV mini-series
2011	Bref	Cette fille (Sarah)	TV series
2012	Les hommes de l'ombre	Beurette	TV series
2013	Light, Pearl and Gold	Alice	Short film
2013	Le locataire	Arielle	Short
2013	Serial Teachers	Marie	
2014	Never on the First Night	Charlotte	
2014	Babysitting	Sonia	
2014	Les Francis	Vanina Campana	
2015	Babysitting 2	Sonia	
2016	Two Is a Family	woman at the party	
2025	Bref 2	Sarah	
