= Super-héros malgré lui =

French superhero comedy film

- Theatrical release poster
- Directed by: Philippe Lacheau
- Written by: Julien Arruti; Pierre Dudan; Philippe Lacheau; Pierre Lacheau
- Produced by: Julien Deris; David Gauquié; Philippe Lacheau
- Starring: Philippe Lacheau; Julien Arruti; Tarek Boudali; Élodie Fontan; Alice Dufour; Jean-Hugues Anglade; Georges Corraface
- Cinematography: Vincent Richard
- Edited by: Marc David; Antoine Vareille
- Music by: Maxime Desprez; Michaël Tordjman
- Production companies: BAF Productions; Cinéfrance; TF1
- Distributed by: StudioCanal
- Release dates: 14 November 2021 (premiere); 2 February 2022
- Running time: 82 minutes
- Country: France
- Language: French
- Budget: $16.8 million
- Box office: $14.8 million

Super-héros malgré lui (lit. 'A Superhero in Spite of Himself'; also known as Superwho? and Badman) is a 2021 French superhero comedy film directed by Philippe Lacheau, who also co-wrote the screenplay with Julien Arruti, Pierre Dudan and Pierre Lacheau. It stars Philippe Lacheau, Tarek Boudali, Julien Arruti, Élodie Fontan, Alice Dufour, Jean-Hugues Anglade, Amr Waked, and Georges Corraface. The film premiered on 14 November in Sarrebourg before its nationwide launch on 2 February 2022.

== Plot ==
Cédric Dugimont is an out-of-luck actor struggling to make a name for himself. His most high-profile job consists in appearing in advertisements for small-sized condoms. One day, he is offered the lead role in a superhero film, Badman, after the director's first choice is accidentally killed while celebrating the initial announcement.

Following months of intense training, Cédric begins filming with renowned actor Alain Belmont, who plays Badman's arch-nemesis, Clown. After the first day of shooting, Cédric is notified that his father, police chief Michel, has suddenly collapsed. Still wearing his Badman costume underneath a jacket, Cédric rushes to the hospital driving the Badmobile, but a faulty prop explosive in the car's trunk causes him to crash through a bank. Cédric wakes up and experiences amnesia, but upon seeing the film props inside the car, he is convinced that he is Badman and attacks two police officers by the lake before disappearing.

After being picked up by a family to stay in their home for the night, Cédric turns on his prop watch and plays a prerecorded scene of Clown holding Badman's wife and son hostage, believing all of this is real. He leaves and heads to Clown's hideout in Vaucresson, which is actually Belmont's home. Cédric hitches a ride from Laure Laville, a news reporter, but she takes a detour to cover a bank robbery committed by Le Schizo and his gang.

When one of Le Schizo's thugs attempts to kidnap Laure, Cédric gets into character to confront him and manages to knock him out before driving off with Laure whom he ditches. While being chased by Le Schizo and his gang, Cédric sneaks into Belmont's mansion and stumbles upon Belmont's birthday party; furthermore he discovers that Badman's wife and son are actually those of Belmont. Cédric kidnaps Belmont's son and attempts to hide in a barn, but he is knocked out by Michel, who lets him escape when he discovers his real identity.

Cédric's sister Éléonore and his friends Adam and Seb bring him to the studio, where they try to make him recover his memories. Just as Cédric remembers who he is, Le Schizo appears and confronts him over the botched robbery. Using his grappling hook, Cédric disarms Le Schizo, sending his loaded gun to the studio next door. Following a grueling fight, Cédric defeats Le Schizo and leaves him for Michel and the police to arrest.

The next day, Cédric visits Laure and learns that she is his former girlfriend, and they promptly reconnect while the news reports that Tom Cruise was accidentally shot in the buttocks with a loaded gun during the filming of a Mission: Impossible sequel. At the world premiere of Badman, Cédric acknowledges his father, who has officially retired from the force. The film ends with a scene from Badman, where Badman defeats Clown and saves his wife and son.

== Cast ==
- Philippe Lacheau as Cédric Dugimont / Badman
- Julien Arruti as Seb
- Tarek Boudali as Adam
- Élodie Fontan as Éléonore Dugimont
- Alice Dufour as Laure Laville
- Jean-Hugues Anglade as Michel Dugimont
- Amr Waked as Ivan Stona / Le Schizo
- Chantal Ladesou as the Producer
- Brahim Bouhlel as Jimmy
- Georges Corraface as Alain Belmont / Clown
- Paco Boisson as José
- Rayane Bensetti as Ludovic
- Régis Laspalès as Jean-Pierre

== Production ==
Filming began in August 2020 in parts of Île-de-France, including Rueil-Malmaison, Hauts-de-Seine, Gif-sur-Yvette, Mennecy, and Essonne.

It was considered to delete a scene involving an accidental shooting on set due to its similarity to a 2021 incident when Alec Baldwin accidentally shot and killed cinematographer Halyna Hutchins on the set of Rust. When asked about the scene, co-writer and actor Julien Arruti said it was written two years before the Rust incident; thus, it was decide to keep the scene in the film.

== Release ==
Super-héros malgré lui premiered on 14 November 2021 in Sarrebourg and Strasbourg before its general release in France on 2 February 2022. It was released in Japan on 15 July 2022 under the title Badman: Shijōsaitei no Superhero (バッドマン 史上最低のスーパーヒーロー; Badman: The Worst Superhero Ever).

== Box office and reception ==
Super-héros malgré lui debuted at #1 in France, selling 142,435 tickets at 688 theatres. It earned a worldwide gross of US$14,770,359.

The film was met with mixed reviews. AlloCiné has the film rated at two-and-a-half out of five stars, based on 19 reviews.
