= Mes trésors =

- Directed by: Pascal Bourdiaux
- Written by: Carole Giacobbi; Michèle Giacobbi; Juliette Sales; Fabien Suarez
- Produced by: Clément Miserez; Matthieu Warter; Michèle Giacobbi; Jean-Charles Levy; Nicolas Manuel
- Starring: Jean Reno; Reem Kherici; Camille Chamoux
- Cinematography: Vincent Gallot
- Edited by: Mickael Dumontier
- Music by: Sinclair
- Production company: Radar Films
- Distributed by: SND Films
- Release date: 4 January 2017
- Running time: 91 minutes
- Country: France
- Language: French
- Budget: $12.2 million
- Box office: $1.8 million

Mes trésors is a 2017 French comedy film directed by Pascal Bourdiaux.

== Plot ==
A high-profile burglar gathers his two daughters to prepare a final break.

== Cast ==
- Jean Reno as Patrick
- Reem Kherici as Caroline
- Camille Chamoux as Carole
- Pascal Demolon as Romain
- Alexis Michalik as Guillaume
- Bruno Sanches as Fred
- Natalia Verbeke as Julianna Van Gaal
- Jean Reynès as Wladimir Daroff
- Laurent Bateau as The notary
