= Bref =

French TV series or program

- Created by: Kyan Khojandi
- Written by: Kyan Khojandi; Bruno Muschio
- Starring: Kyan Khojandi
- Country of origin: France
- Original language: French
- No. of seasons: 2
- No. of episodes: 82 (season 1); 6 (season 2)

Production
- Producer: Harry Tordjman
- Running time: approximately 2 minutes (season 1); 30–40 minutes (season 2)

Original release
- Network: Canal+
- Release: 29 August 2011 – 12 July 2012
- Network: Hulu (Disney+)
- Release: 14 February 2025
- Network: TF1
- Release: 4 May 2026

Bref. (stylized with a period; English: In short.) is a French television series created by Kyan Khojandi, cowritten with Bruno Muschio, and produced by Harry Tordjman for My Box Productions. The first episode was released on Canal+ 29 August 2011 and the show ended on 12 July 2012, following an announcement to that effect on 29 June 2012.

After a 14-year break, Disney+ announced the return of the series with a second season in February 2025. The 6 episodes were released on 14 February on the Hulu hub.

The second season was also aired on TF1 in May 2026.

== Plot ==
=== Season 1 ===
The main character is an anonymous 30-year-old Parisian (he celebrates his 30th birthday in the 46th episode), single and unemployed. He is referred to as "I", and his name is never revealed to the audience. His life is boring until he meets a girl at a party who he falls in love with. As soon as the party is over, his only wish is to see her again. Many of the show's episodes are devoted to his failed attempts at meeting up with her or really connecting.

The hero sometimes looks for a job, and finally gets a one-on-one interview in a copying machine company. Despite a catastrophic interview in which the interviewer saw through every lie on his resume, he gets the job. Nevertheless, exasperated by his coworkers and bored by the job, he quits. Thereafter, he works in a call center (Telecom 3000).

He keeps going to a lot of parties to meet girls and has a series of one-night stands. He also has a one-off sexual encounter with his ex-girlfriend and later with a girl who turned him down when he was a teenager. Meanwhile, he regularly meets "Marla", his sexfriend.

In order to seduce more girls, he learns how to play the guitar. At the beginning, it was just a way to hit on girls but it soon becomes a hobby, and he finally performs at concert, using the stage name "Amer de toi" (Bitter about you).

The hero and his brother Keyvan are really close, to such an extent that they understand each other at a simple glance and hardly need to talk to communicate. "I" often calls his brother to get advice or to be reassured. Their parents get divorced because of the unfaithfulness of the father, who had an affair with a student. After realizing that his love for the student is not reciprocated, the narrator's father ends up alone before settling in his son's flat, much to the chagrin of the latter. Finally, the father moves into another flat in the same apartment block.

Keyvan decides to move in with the love of his life and therefore enables "I" to occupy his flat after a catastrophic flat sharing with Baptiste, who never does any housework or tidies up. But fate is not on his side. Keyvan's girlfriend decides to break up, and so the hero has to live with his father because Baptiste has already found a new room-mate.

The hero is still in love with "this girl" (Sarah), and approaches her bit by bit. He despairs of ever making a real connection with her until the day she invites him to come over. They eventually kiss each other. They start a relationship and settle in a new flat. During this time, Marla attempts to meet up with "I", but ends up meeting Sarah. Facing to them, "I" has to make a choice and decides to stay with Sarah.

Over time, "I" and Sarah become distant from one another, and after getting drunk at a bar, he cheats on her. He keeps it as a secret until another party, where he unleashes his anger and confesses his resentment against his friends and finally hits an uninvited guest. He leaves the party and tries to renew his relationship with Marla, but she has already found herself another man. Finally, after a depression, "I" moves in with Baptiste again and resumes the boring life he had before meeting Sarah.

== Cast ==
- Kyan Khojandi as I
- Alice David as This Girl
- Bérengère Krief as Marla
- Keyvan Khojandi as Keyvan
- Mikaël Alhawi as Ben
- Éric Reynaud-Fourton as The father
- Marina Pastor as The mother
- Kheiron as Kheiron
- Juliette Tresanini as The ex
- Romain Fleury as Marc
- Maud Bettina-Marie as Keyvan's girlfriend
- Axelle Bossard as The aunt
- Eric Laugérias as The uncle
- Baptiste Lecaplain as Baptiste
- David Salles as the therapist
- Blanche Gardin as Katie
- Sébastien Dédominicis as Julien
- Laure Hennequart as Laure
- Sarah-Lou Lemaitre as Manuela
- Gaelle Oileau as Christine
- Patrick Piard as Steeve
- Emma Chaibedra as Jessica

New characters were introducted in season 2, including :

- Laura Felpin as Billie
- Jean-Paul Rouve as Jean-Jacques
- Alexandre Astier as the alcoholic therapist
- Doria Tillier as She
- Carlito (Raphaël Carlier) as Jérome

== Reception ==
The series was a tremendous success in France, having quickly reached an audience peak of over 2.5 million viewers and an audience share of 9.5% on 6 October 2011.

== Episodes ==
=== Season 1 ===
1. Bref. J'ai dragué cette fille (I hit on that girl) ((29 August 2011)
2. Bref. Je remets tout à demain (I leave everything for tomorrow) (30 August 2011)
3. Bref. Je me suis préparé pour un rendez-vous (I got ready for a date) (1 September 2011)
4. Bref. J'ai passé un entretien d'embauche (I had a job interview) (5 September 2011)
5. Bref. J'ai fait un repas de famille (I had a family meal) (7 September 2011)
6. Bref. J'ai traîné sur internet (I messed about online) (8 September 2011)
7. Bref. Je joue de la guitare (I play the guitar) (12 September 2011)
8. Bref. J'ai vu un psy (I saw a shrink) (13 September 2011)
9. Bref. J'ai recroisé cette fille (I saw that girl again) (15 September 2011)
10. Bref. J'ai un plan cul régulier (I have a sexfriend) (19 September 2011)
11. Bref. Je suis comme tout le monde (I'm like everyone else) (20 September 2011)
12. Bref. J'ai eu un job (I had a job) (22 September 2011)
13. Bref. J'étais coincé dans l'ascenseur (I was stuck in the elevator) (26 September 2011)
14. Bref. Mes parents divorcent (My parents are getting divorced) (27 September 2011)
15. Bref. J'ai fait les courses avec mon frère (I went shopping with my brother) (29 September 2011)
16. Bref. Je me suis bourré la gueule (I got sloshed) (3 October 2011)
17. Bref. Je suis allé à ce mariage (I went to that wedding) (4 October 2011)
18. Bref. J'ai couché avec une flic (I slept with a cop) (5 October 2011)
19. Bref. Mon pote s'est fait larguer (My mate got dumped) (10 October 2011)
20. Bref. J'ai eu 47 minutes de retard (I was 47 minutes late) (12 October 2011)
21. Bref. Je suis allé au supermarché (I went to the supermarket) (14 October 2011)
22. Bref. On a enterré Croquette (We buried Croquette) (20 October 2011)
23. Bref. Mon coloc a fait l'amour (My flatmate got laid) (21 October 2011)
24. Bref. J'ai fait un rêve (I had a dream) (31 October 2011)
25. Bref. J'ai fait un dépistage (I got tested) (3 November 2011)
26. Bref. J'ai un pote à conditions générales (I have a friend with terms and conditions) (10 November 2011)
27. Bref. J'ai recouché avec mon ex (I slept with my ex again) (14 November 2011)
28. Bref. J'aime bien cette photo (I love that photo) (16 November 2011)
29. Bref. Je suis hypocondriaque (I'm a hypochondriac) (21 November 2011)
30. Bref. J'ai pas réussi à dormir (I couldn't get to sleep) (22 November 2011)
31. Bref. Je suis allé au cinéma avec cette fille (I went to the cinema with that girl) (28 November 2011)
32. Bref. Je sais pas dire non (I don't know how to say no) (1 December 2011)
33. Bref. J'ai couché avec Émilie (I slept with Émilie) (5 December 2011)
34. Bref. J'ai fait un concert (I did a concert) (8 December 2011)
35. Bref. J'ai monté un meuble (I put up some shelves) (13 December 2011)
36. Bref. J’ai dîné avec cette fille (I had dinner with that girl) (4 January 2012)
37. Bref. J’y pense et je souris (I think about things and I smile) (6 January 2012)
38. Bref. J'ai voulu partir en vacances (I wanted to go on holiday) (10 January 2012)
39. Bref. J’ai déménagé (I moved out) (12 January 2012)
40. Bref. J’étais à côté de cette fille (I'm next to that girl) (18 January 2012)
41. Bref. J'ai pris le métro (I took the metro) (24 January 2012)
42. Bref. J'habite avec cette fille (I live with that girl) (26 January 2012)
43. Bref. Je suis allé aux urgences (I went to A&E) (31 January 2012)
44. Bref. Je me suis fait agresser (I was attacked) (2 February 2012)
45. Bref. J'ai eu une panne (I couldn't keep it up) (6 February 2012)
46. Bref. J'ai eu 30 ans (I reached 30) (8 February 2012)
47. Bref. Je suis vieille (I'm old) (20 February 2012)
48. Bref. Ma copine travaille dans un sex-shop (My girlfriend works in a sex shop) (24 February 2012)
49. Bref. Baptiste est super flippant (Baptist is super creepy) (27 February 2012)
50. Bref. J'ai fêté le nouvel an (I celebrated the new year) (5 March 2012)
51. Bref. Mon frère a quelqu'un (My brother is seeing someone) (8 March 2012)
52. Bref. Je suis en couple (I'm in a relationship) (13 March 2012)
53. Bref. Y a des gens qui m'énervent (There are people who annoy me) (19 March 2012)
54. Bref. J'ai aucune mémoire (I have no memory) (22 March 2012)
55. Bref. Je m'appelle Eric Dampierre (My name is Eric Dampierre) (26 March 2012)
56. Bref. J'ai grandi dans les années 90 (I grew up in the 90s) (29 March 2012)
57. Bref. On était des gamins (We were kids) (2 April 2012)
58. Bref. C'était sa chanson préférée (It was her favourite song) (3 April 2012)
59. Bref. Mon père veut être jeune (My dad wants to be young) (12 April 2012)
60. Bref. Je suis un plan cul régulier (I am a sexfriend) (16 April 2012)
61. Bref. J'étais dans la merde (I was in trouble) (19 April 2012)
62. Bref. J'étais toujours dans la merde (I was still in trouble) (23 April 2012)
63. Bref. J'ai fait un choix (I made a choice) (30 April 2012)
64. Bref. Je crois que j'ai un secret (I think I have a secret) (1^{er} May 2012)
65. Bref. J'ai juste un pote (I'm just a mate) (10 May 2012)
66. Bref. Mon frère est comme tout le monde (My brother is like everyone else) (29 May 2012)
67. Bref. J'ai perdu mes cheveux (I lost my hair) (4 June 2012)
68. Bref. J'ai passé un coup de fil (I made a phone call) (5 June 2012)
69. Bref. C'est la merde (This is crap) (11 June 2012)
70. Bref. J'ai fait une connerie (I did something stupid) (12 June 2012)
71. Bref. J'ai fait une soirée déguisée (I went to a fancy dress party) (18 June 2012)
72. Bref. J'ai fait une soirée déguisée (partie 2) (I went to a fancy dress party part 2) (21 June 2012)
73. Bref. J'ai fait une soirée déguisée (partie 3) (I went to a fancy dress party part 3) (28 June 2012)
74. Bref. J'me casse (I'm leaving) (2 July 2012)
75. Bref. J'ai tout cassé (I left everything) (3 July 2012)
76. Bref. Je suis en mode survie (I'm in survival mode) (4 July 2012)
77. Bref. J'ai envoyé un texto (I sent a text message) (5 July 2012)
78. Bref. Je me suis réveillé à côté d'une fille (I woke up next to a girl) (9 July 2012)
79. Bref. Je suis né (I was born) (10 July 2012)
80. Bref. J'ai fait une dépression (I went through a depression) (11 July 2012)
81. Bref. Lui c'est Kheiron (That's Kheiron) (12 July 2012)
82. Bref. (In short.) (12 July 2012)

=== Season 2 ===
1. Bref. Tout redémarre. (Everything starts again.)
2. Bref. C'était trop tard. (It was too late.)
3. Bref. C'est une question de point de vue. (It's a matter of perspective.)
4. Bref. Tout va bien. (Everything's fine.)
5. Bref. C'était sous mes yeux depuis le début. (It was right in front of me all along.)
6. Bref. C'est du sérieux ? (Is it serious?)

== See also ==
- A Shared House
- Hollywood Girls: Une nouvelle vie en Californie
- Emerging adulthood
- Quarter-life crisis
- Ageing
- Twixter
- Young professional
- Youth
- History of erotic depictions
- Cultural history of the buttocks
- History of sex
- Casual sex
- Share house
- Young adulthood
- Young adulthood
