= Möbius (film) =

- Movie poster
- Directed by: Éric Rochant
- Written by: Éric Rochant
- Produced by: Christophe Cervoni; Mathias Rubin
- Starring: Jean Dujardin; Cécile de France
- Cinematography: Pierre Novion
- Edited by: Pascale Fenouillet
- Music by: Jonathan Morali
- Production company: Axel Films
- Distributed by: EuropaCorp Distribution
- Release date: 27 February 2013
- Running time: 103 minutes
- Country: France
- Languages: French; Russian; English
- Budget: $15.2 million
- Box office: $9.2 million

Möbius is a 2013 French film written and directed by Éric Rochant, and starring Jean Dujardin and Cécile de France.

== Plot ==
Russian spy, FSB Agent Gregory Lyubov is sent to Monaco to watch the actions of the powerful Russian oligarch Ivan Rostovskiy. As part of this mission, the team recruits a talented finance expert named Alice. Suspecting her of treason, Gregory breaks the golden rule and makes contact with Alice. Between them begins a passion that might destroy them.

== Cast ==
- Jean Dujardin as Moïse / Gregory Lyubov
- Cécile de France as Alice Radmond
- Tim Roth as Ivan Rostovsky
- Émilie Dequenne as Sandra
- John Lynch as Joshua
- Dean Constantin as Joshua's Main Agent
- Vladimir Menshov as Cherkachin
- Branka Katić as Ava
- Wendell Pierce as Bob
- Oleksiy Gorbunov as Khorzov, Rostovsky's Head of Security
- Vicky Krieps as Olga
- Dmitry Nazarov as Inzirillo
- Maksim Vitorgan as Sobchak
- Michael J. Shannon as The Father of Alice
- Brad Leland as CIA Agent Mobius

== Production ==
In November 2011, Jean Dujardin and Cecile de France were cast join the film production.

During Cannes Festival in May 2012, Tim Roth confessed he would play the role of a Russian oligarch suspect in crime. Director Eric Rochant found a physical resemblance between the actor and Roman Abramovich, Russian oligarch ranked in ninth place of the largest fortunes of his country and owner of the London-based football club Chelsea F.C.

According to Le Figaro, filming began in May 2012, and lasted eight to nine weeks in the south of France, Luxembourg, Brussels, Belgium and Moscow, Russia; and post-production started in October 2012.

== Critical reception ==
The film received mixed reviews from the press and public.

== See also ==
- Möbius strip
