= Christophe Cervoni =

French film producer

Christophe Cervoni is a French film producer.

== Filmography ==
- Qui cherche trouve, (short, 2001)
- Girlfriends, (2006)
- Le café du pont, (2010)
- De l'huile sur le feu, (2011)
- Hénaut président, (2012)
- Möbius, (2013)
- Babysitting, (2014)
- Le criquet, (short, 2014)
- Babysitting 2, (2015)
- Sophiloscope, (short, 2017)
- Épouse-moi mon pote, (2017)
- Comment tuer sa mère, (2018)
- Nicky Larson et le Parfum de Cupidon, (2018)
- 30 jours max, (2020)
