= Polaroid Song =

2012 French short film

Polaroid Song is a French short film directed by Alphonse Giorgi and Yann Tivrier in 2011. Completed in 2012, Polaroid Song was broadcast on French public national television channel France 2 in April and September 2012 and was competitively selected for several film festivals throughout the world.

== Plot ==
In 1991, Lise is 18. The Gulf War ends, USSR collapses, Nirvana gives birth in a pool and three girls create the rock band Periodink. Their first concert will be for Lise the time to get through the age of adolescence.

== Cast ==
- Audrey Giacomini: Lise
- Nolwenn Auguste: Flory
- Deila Vogur: Lauriane
- Hélène Sargue: Ivy
- Dominique Bettenfeld: Pascal Julliard
- Edouard Audouin: Daniel Gatien
- Bruno Sanches: Xavier

== Festivals ==
- 2012 : NXNE North by Northeast Festival of Toronto - Canada
- 2012 : Philadelphia QFest - USA
- 2012 : Lisbon Gay & Lesbian Film Festival - Queer Lisboa - Portugal
- 2012 : SouthSide Film Festival of Bethlehem, Pennsylvania - USA
- 2012 : Festival Troyes Premières Marches - France
- 2012 : Festival Partie(s) de Campagne - France
- 2012 : Festival Etang d'Arts in Marseille - France
- 2012 : Fête des Compositeurs de Musique de Films à Paris - France
- 2012 : Towson University Queer Film Fest in Baltimore - USA
- 2012 : Festival l'Ecran s'Ecrit of Allevard - France
- 2012 : Hell's Half Mile Film & Music Festival, Bay City, Michigan - USA
- 2012 : Birmingham SHOUT, Sidewalk Moving Picture Festival in Birmingham, Alabama - USA
- 2012 : Brest European Short Film Festival - France
- 2012 : Festival fr:Off-Courts in Trouville - France
- 2012 : de:Interfilm Berlin Festival in Berlin - Germany
- 2012 : Festival du cinéma LGBT Image+nation in Montreal - Canada
- 2013 : Roze Filmdagen Amsterdam Gay & Lesbian Film Festival in Amsterdam - Netherlands
- 2013 : MQFF, Melbourne Queer Film Festival in Melbourne - Australia
- 2013 : de:Regensburger Kurtzfilmwoche in Regensburg - Germany
- 2013 : ÉCU The European Independent Film festival in Paris - France
- 2013 : Festival de Films Courts En Betton in fr:Betton - France
- 2013 : Festival Cinéma Désir Désirs in Tours - France
- 2013 : Kyiv International Queer Film Festival in Kyiv - Ukraine
- 2013 : TLV Fest, Tel Aviv International LGBT Film Festival in Tel Aviv - Israel
- 2013 : Inside Out LGBT Film Festival in Toronto - Canada
- 2013 : Mix Milano LGBT Film Festival in Milan - Italy
- 2013 : Gaze LGBT Film Festival in Dublin - Ireland
- 2013 : Cheries-Cheris, Paris International LGBT Film Festival - France
