= Reem Kherici =

French film director and actress of Tunisian and Italian descent

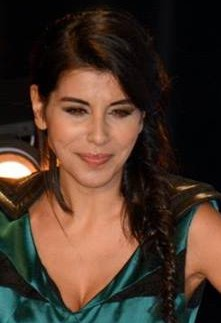
- Reem Kherici at the 19th Lumière Awards
- Born: 13 February 1983 (age 43); Neuilly-sur-Seine, France
- Occupations: Actress, director, screenwriter
- Years active: 2003–present

Reem Kherici (born 13 February 1983) is a French film director and actress of Tunisian and Italian descent. In 2013 she wrote and directed her first film and in 2017 she wrote and appeared in the romantic comedy film "Jour J" (D Day).

== Life ==
Kherici was born in France in 1983. Her parents were immigrants as her mother is Italian and her father is Tunisian. He was ambitious for her to have a career in science and he was disappointed when she became an actor.

She came to notice on the radio in 2002 on Fun Radio. The following year she was the host of a TV programme Girls of the Weekend on Fun TV. In 2004 she met Philippe Lacheau, alias Fifi and she appeared intermittently on La Cave à l'Info with Fifi and his troupe. In 2005, the Band to Fifi was on TV every night in Le Grand Journal by Canal +, with Birthdays and is noticed during the 59 ^{th} Cannes Film Festival for his live skits.

In 2006–2007, the Bande à Fifi was presenting live every weekday, within Canal +'s Grand Journal.

In 2009, she took part in the W9 program Chut, chut, chut with the same Fifi troupe and also on France 4 as a recurring guest in The Open Door to All Windows, a program presented by Cyril Hanouna. She also took a major part in the spy spoof film, OSS 117: Lost in Rio which was released in 2009.

In 2013 she write, directed and starred in the romantic comedy film "Paris at any Price".

In 2020 she was a celebrity chosen to appear in an Amazon programme where comedians compete for a prize by getting each other to laugh.

== Personal life ==
In 2004, she dated actor Philippe Lacheau. She is now in a relationship with Gilles Lemaire, the son of Myriam Ullens, and they had a son in 2019.

== Filmography ==
Year	Title	Role	Director	Notes
2009	OSS 117: Lost in Rio	Carlotta	Michel Hazanavicius	
2009	Neuilly Yo Mama!	Rislem	Gabriel Julien-Laferrière	
2009	Bob Ghetto		Stéphane Marelli	TV series (1 episode)
2010	Fatal	Malaisia	Michaël Youn	
2010	Au bonheur des hommes	Crystal Carlier	Vincent Monnet	TV movie
2011	Colombiana	Nymphette	Olivier Megaton	
2011	Bienvenue à bord	Russian's wife	Éric Lavaine	
2013	Paris à tout prix	Maya Ben Latif	Reem Kherici	Also writer Nominated – Palm Springs International Film Festival – New Visions Grand Jury Prize
2016	Le convoi	Nadia	Frédéric Schoendoerffer	
2016	Débarquement immédiat !	Maria Carasco	Philippe de Chauveron	
2017	Jour J	Juliette	Reem Kherici (2)	Also writer
2017	Mes trésors	Caroline	Pascal Bourdiaux	
2017	Sahara	Alexandrie	Pierre Coré	
2017	Holy Lands	Rivka	Amanda Sters	
2018	Nicky Larson et le Parfum de Cupidon	Fille Tatouée	Philippe Lacheau	
2020	Brutus vs César	Efna	Kheiron	
2020	30 Jours max	Linda	Tarek Boudali	
2023	Alibi.com 2	Shana	Philippe Lacheau	
2023	3 Jours max	Linda	Tarek Boudali	
2024	Chien et chat	Monica	Reem Kherici	Also writer
2026	Marsupilami	Hélène	Philippe Lacheau	
2026	Good Vibes Only	Victoria	Reem Kherici	Also writer

== Theater ==
Year	Title	Author	Director	Notes
2008–09	Qui a tué le mort ?	Philippe Lacheau, Tarek Boudali & Julien Arruti	Philippe Lacheau & Morgan Spillemaecker	Le Splendid

== Television ==
Year	TV Show	Channel
2003	Les Filles du week-end	Fun TV
2005	La Cave à l'info	Canal+
2005–07	Le Grand Journal	Canal+
2009	Chut, chut, chut	W9
2009	La Porte ouverte à toutes les fenêtres	France 4
