= Tarek Boudali =

French actor and comedian

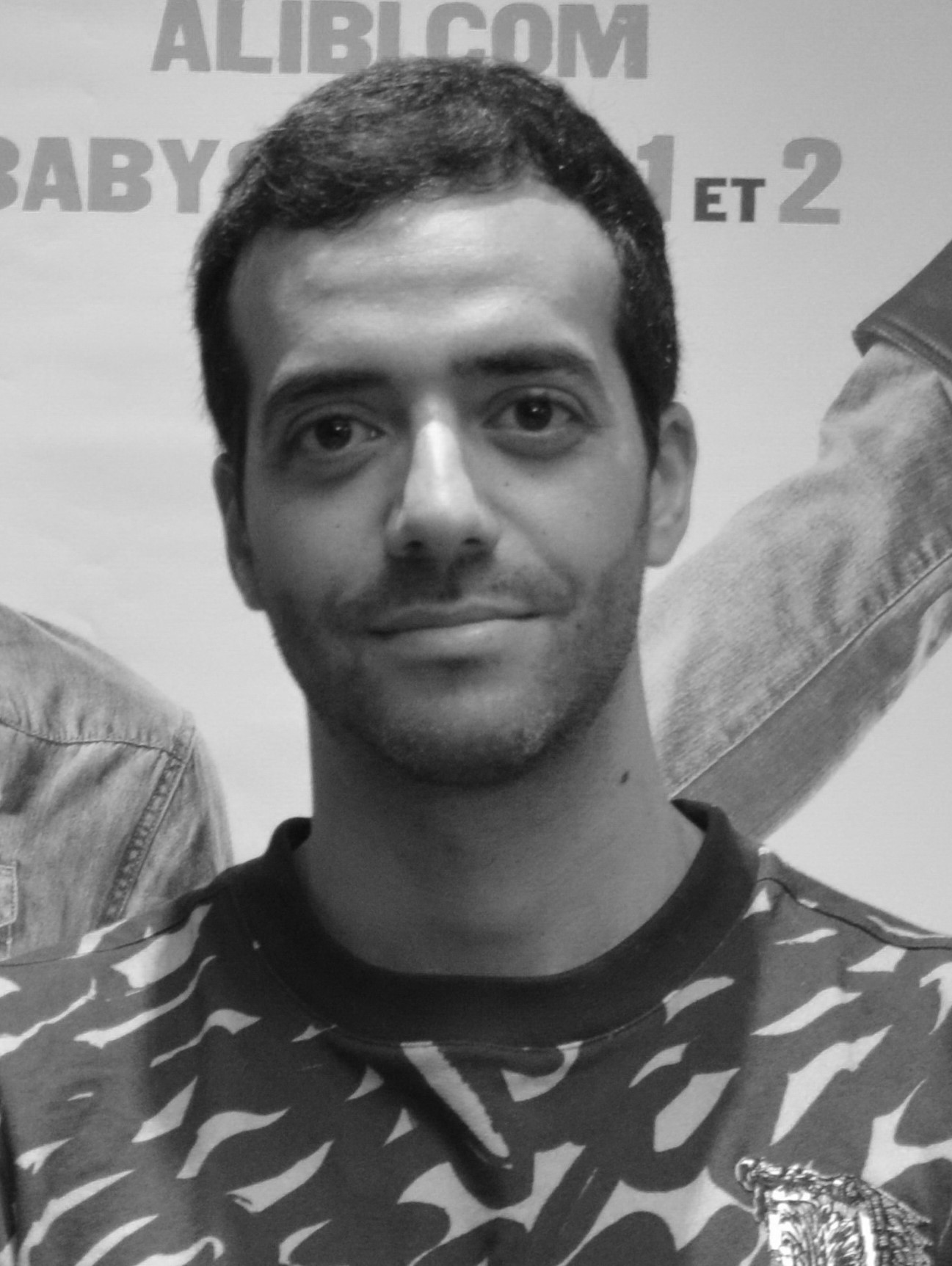
- Tarek Boudali in 2017
- Born: 5 November 1979 (age 46)
- Occupations: Actor, humorist

Tarek Boudali (Arabic: طارق بودالي; born 5 November 1979) is a French actor and humorist of Moroccan origin.

== Life and career ==
Tarek Boudali, of Moroccan origin, graduated with a Higher Technician Certificate (BTS) Sales Force. In 2012, he joined the cast of the M6 series En famille, where he plays the role of Kader, a young father. He then had film success with Babysitting, released in 2014.

He is part of La Bande à Fifi, a French comedy troupe bringing together Philippe Lacheau, Élodie Fontan, Tarek Boudali, Reem Kherici and Julien Arruti.

In 2018, he joined the Les Enfoirés.

== Filmography ==
=== Feature films ===
Year	Title	Role	Director	Notes
2010	Heartbreaker	The Director of the Monte Carlo Bay Hotel	Pascal Chaumeil	
2010	L'Italien	Karim	Olivier Baroux	
2013	Paris à tout prix	Tarek	Reem Kherici	
2014	Babysitting	Sam	Nicolas Benamou & Philippe Lacheau	
2015	Babysitting 2	Sam	Nicolas Benamou & Philippe Lacheau	
2017	Alibi.com	Mehdi	Philippe Lacheau	
2017	Épouse-moi mon pote	Yassine	Tarek Boudali	
2020	30 Days Left	Rayane	Tarek Boudali	
2019	Nicky Larson et le Parfum de Cupidon	Poncho	Philippe Lacheau	
2021	Super-héros malgré lui	Adam	Philippe Lacheau	
2022	Menteur	Jérôme Berada	Olivier Baroux	
2023	Alibi.com 2	Mehdi	Philippe Lacheau	
2023	3 Days Left	Rayane	Tarek Boudali	
2024	Heros Nick Lion And Mouse	Tarek	Pierre Palmade	

=== Television ===
Year	Title	Role	Director	Notes
2012–present	En famille	Kader Ben Gazaouira		TV series
2015	Peplum	The Scapegoat of Cleopatra		Miniseries - Episode 1
