= Ciel Rouge =

French film directed by Olivier Lorelle

Ciel rouge (literally, 'red sky') is a French film written and directed by Olivier Lorelle, shot in 2015 and released in 2017. It is set in the first Vietnamese offensive against French colonial rule and follows the fate of a French soldier and a young Viet Minh rebel whom he frees.

== Synopsis ==
In 1946 in Vietnam, at a French army base in the jungle, Philippe, a young recruit (played by Cyril Descours), has to guard a female Viet Minh prisoner, called Thi (Audrey Giacomini). Philippe had signed up to bring peace to an unknown country of dense forests and spectacular mountains but his ideals collapse when he is told he must torture and kill a young Vietnamese woman fighting for independence. Horrified by the torture to which she will be subjected and her potential execution, he frees her then himself deserts into the jungle. Thi guides him through the uninhabited forests to safer places, during which journey she lets drop her guard, allowing herself to put aside her political ideals for romantic and sensual experience, while Philippe loses his military mindset to be closer to her ideals, though more through love than conviction. However, while he dreams of a romantic idyll with her and their future children, she decides she will not rest until the revolution is successful.

== Cast ==
- Cyril Descours : Philippe
- Audrey Giacomini : Thi

The only other named actors in the final credits are Nguyen Huy Khuong, Charles Mugnier and Dinh Minh Chien.

== Production ==
=== Development ===
Olivier Lorelle is a former professor of philosophy, who began writing film scenarios (especially for Rachid Bouchareb); in preparation for this film he undertook considerable research into the lives of women of the Viet Minh, above all using the biography of Xuân Phương Ao Dai: Du couvent des Oiseaux à la jungle du Viêt-minh by Danièle Mazingarbe. Lorelle's basic intention was to follow an "impossible" love story during a war: a soldier, fascinated by his enemy's courage flees with her. For this the director chose not the battle front of a war, but in a situation where combatants lose their bearings in a country which swallows them; such as the Indochina wars.

For the main actors the director was looking for "classic beauty, something pure in the shapes of their face, to project the romanticism of the film", to complement the beauty of the natural world. He wanted actors who could express artlessness - she engaged in the revolution and him in a state of wonder at nature. As the two characters become "porous" to each other during the film, an essential quality he sought was 'solid fragility' ("solide fragilité"). Giacomini took part in the initial auditions without success but she insisted to be seen again.

The scenes involving just the two actors were rehearsed first in Paris then in a theatre in Hanoi, simply to offer them support in the way they played without pushing the emotional side. Lorelle recounted that "we dropped them in the jungle with the two chief operators on their heels" and "filmed for 19 days, using two cameras, shooting everything in long takes, even rehearsals". This resulted in a total of 70 hours of rushes to edit (the final duration is 91 minutes). There were "slips, surprises", and at editing, long sequences of sometimes fifteen minutes, giving real "cinematic matter which one could sculpt, keeping unexpected camera movements". Lorelle wanted the film to show a tension between the story as it moves forward, via the active character of Thi, and the contemplation that slows it down, through the character of Philippe.

=== Filming ===
The film was shot entirely on location in Vietnam, including a section at and on Ba Bể Lake in the north of the country, as well as a valley in Hà Giang Province. The film was shot more or less in the order of the action.

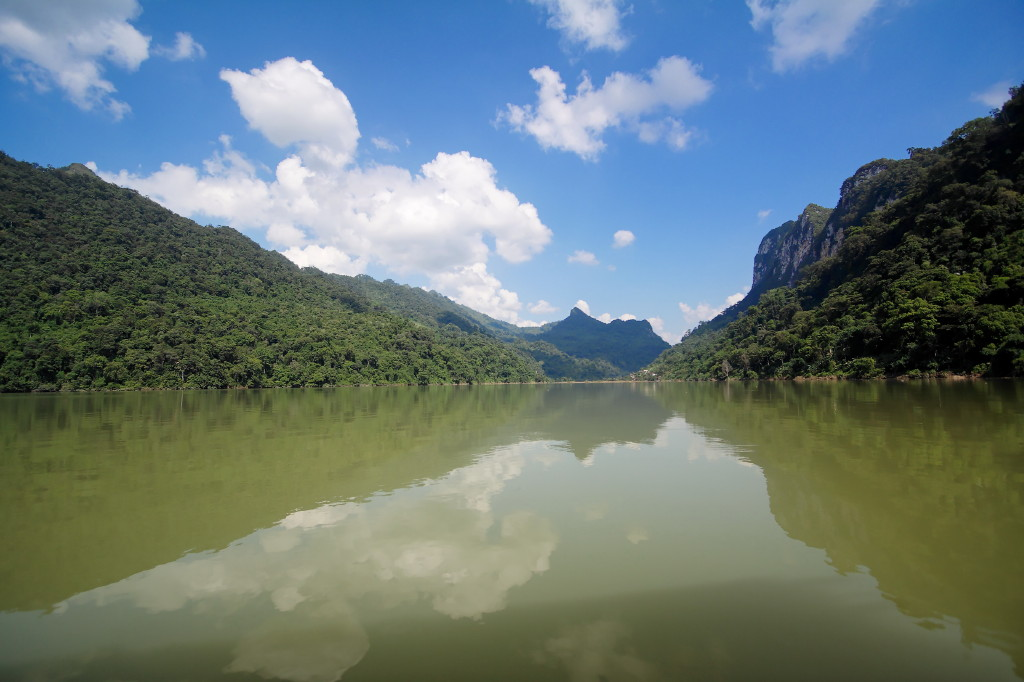
Ba Be Lake where part of the film was shot

The co-producer of the film was Chiều Xuân, well known in Vietnam, who took care of obtaining all the necessary authorisations from local authorities and organising the décors. There were 19 days of shooting simultaneously using two cameras, with everything in long take ("plan séquence") lasting up to 15 minutes, and even filming rehearsals.

The chief sound operator Armand Soulier reported that the shoot involved two cameras, an FX700 and an Alpha 7, and required an approach like that of documentary filming: "light and mobile, for a film close to a 'road movie', by foot in the jungle and mountains". Given the considerable humidity, choice of microphones was limited and therefore the sound equipment consisted of a Sound Devices 788T coupled to an Oktopack.

The music in the film includes Metamorphosis Two by Philip Glass, Should we go home by Ellen Allien, Dusty by Ez3kiel, and Winterreise and Drei Schneewalzer Teil I by Uwe Schmidt. Lorelle sought an electro-style music on the soundtrack which would create a disconnect with the period setting thus giving the film a sort of timelessness. For the most moving sections the piano piece by Glass, which he found heartbreaking, expressed longing for the past, and joy. The soundtrack also makes considerable use of the sounds of birds and insects. Beyond the story itself Lorelle intended the film to be a sensory exploration.

Giacomini commented that Descours improvised on his own the very first scene where he decides to free Thi, which impressed all on the set when they saw the rushes, and set the standard for the rest of the shoot. The scene where the couple discover the paradise full of butterflies fluttering around them by the lake was also an improvisation.

== Release ==
The premiere of the film took place on 23 August 2017 at the cinema L'Arlequin in the 6th arrondissement of Paris. For the Vietnamese premiere, three short scenes were censored. The Vietnamese media showed great interest in the film, with 80 journalists present for the press screenings in Hanoi and Saigon.

The film was issued on DVD in 2018 by jour2fete with a supplementary interview with Olivier Lorelle.

== Reviews and analysis ==
In a detailed examination of the film, one reviewer described Ciel Rouge as "a strange film, which resembles no other, which belongs to no genre". One reviewer noted that, "shot in cinemascope in Vietnam, Ciel rouge is an almost organic film so much one feels the humidity", and that the camera "seems to be possessed by an earthy force". The director "captures vertiginous or confined landscapes, swarms of butterflies, lakes surrounded by mountains", but the film is also the portrait of "a man who decides to follow his passions to the very end: one can either see it as an act of great bravery or folly....". "The director manages to create, with the means at his disposal, a sense of fear both restrained and terrifying, such as the claustrophic scene where the pair try to shelter in underground passageways."

Another review noted that "... Ciel rouge examines the psychological devastation of war and the limits of patriotic commitment", while another commented that "Audrey Giacomini and Cyril Descours display an equal intensity at the same time as undeniable sensuality". François Rieux added, "Between shoulder-held camera and flights of Steadycam redolent of Terrence Malick... this is an atypical war film and a superb erotic romance." Vignaux-Laurent places the romantic episode in the context of a deliberate return to "an original dream - the restraint of Adam and Eve or that of Paul et Virginie", but surrounded by the war.

At the start the action is both slow and fitful; between sequences of torture, the woman prisoner reads a book while junior officers play ping-pong, and there are long silences. The first kiss of Thi and Philippe happens in a tunnel under bombardment as a reaction to the panic of being shut in; thus the film is structured as a counterpoint of war and peace: torture, passing through a massacred village, automatic weapons; against books, rice, the lake episode, radiant dawns. When Philippe asks Thi "Do you want to be free or do you want revenge?", according to Descours by then she is not sure what she wants, having enjoyed freedom with Philippe, but not having previously reflected on liberty, suddenly the idea becomes possible. The brief moments of dialogue are caught within "an historical and geographical ecosystem" full of contradictions and threats. Although the deserter dreams of freedom, of love and life in the wilderness, and escape from violence.

Vignaux-Laurent concludes her review by writing "in 2008, Robert Bresson said 'Don't think about poetry, that will enter through the cracks'. The ineffable spell cast by this film, its deaf lyricism and almost anachronistic romanticism, is through rhythm, internal rhymes, its cohesion".
