= Audrey Giacomini =

French actress and model

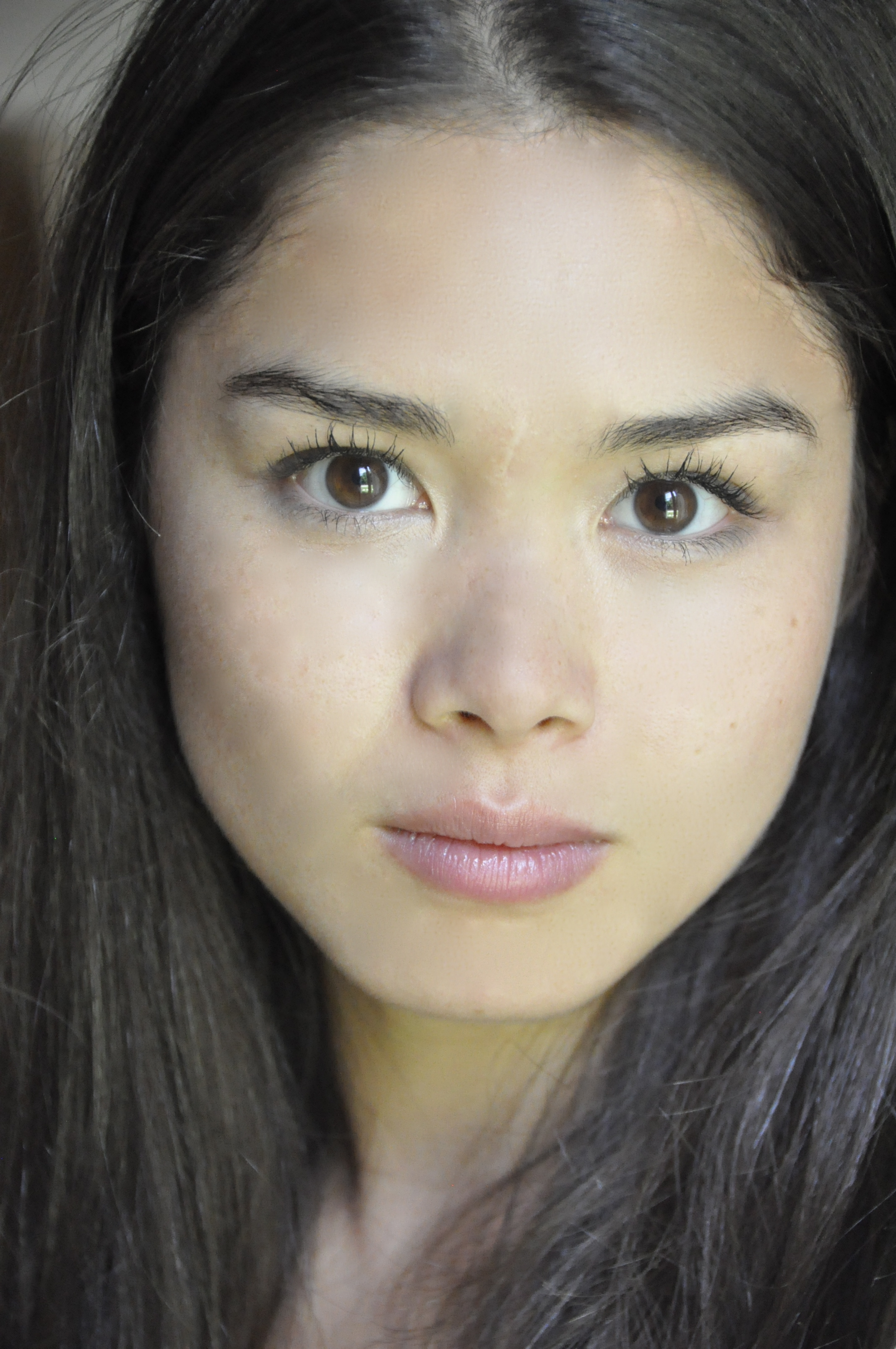
- Giacomini in 2010
- Born: 20 January 1986 (age 40); Rueil-Malmaison, France
- Occupations: Actress, model
- Years active: 1990–present

Audrey Giacomini (born 20 January 1986) is a French actress and model of Vietnamese origin on her maternal grandfather's side, who was half-Vietnamese, half-Italian and half-Breton. She is best known for playing Jeanne in her teenage years in Mr. Nobody (2009). She also played Lisa in Polaroid song (2012) and Ciel Rouge (2017).

Other television credits include Mon père dort au grenier (2009), La taupe 2 (2009), Seconde chance (2009), Strictement platonique (2010), Saïgon, l'été de nos 20 ans (2011).
