= Épouse-moi mon pote =

- Directed by: Tarek Boudali
- Written by: Tarek Boudali; Khaled Amara; Pierre Dudan; Nadia Lakhdar
- Produced by: Marc Fiszman; Christophe Cervoni
- Starring: Tarek Boudali; Philippe Lacheau
- Cinematography: Antoine Marteau
- Edited by: Antoine Vareille
- Music by: Maxime Desprez; Michael Tordjman
- Production companies: StudioCanal; M6 Films; Axel Films; Kabo Films
- Distributed by: StudioCanal
- Release date: 25 October 2017
- Running time: 92 minutes
- Country: France
- Language: French
- Budget: $6 million
- Box office: $21.5 million

Épouse-moi mon pote (meaning "Marry me, my dude" in French) is a 2017 French comedy film. It is the first feature film directed by Tarek Boudali. He also plays the lead role in the film. The film was launched on 25 October 2017 on French screens.

== Synopsis ==
The film tells the story of Yassine, a straight Moroccan guy (played by the director of the film Tarek Boudali) who, by a stroke of bad luck, becomes an illegal immigrant in France. He solves the problem by tying the knot with his best buddy, Fred (played by Philippe Lacheau), except that an immigration officer Dussart (played by Philippe Duquesne) seems to have sniffed out their fake marriage union.

== Cast ==
- Tarek Boudali as Yassine
- Philippe Lacheau as Fred
- Charlotte Gabris as Lisa
- Andy Raconte as Claire
- David Marsais as Stan
- Baya Belal as Ima
- Philippe Duquesne as Dussart
- Doudou Masta as Daoud
- Nadia Kounda as Sana
- Julien Arruti as The blind
- Zinedine Soualem as Yassine's father
- Yves Pignot as The mayor
- Ramzy Bedia as A qatari

== Reception ==
Épouse-moi mon pote grossed $21.5 million at the box office.
