= Alibi.com =

- Directed by: Philippe Lacheau
- Written by: Julien Arruti; Philippe Lacheau; Pierre Dudan
- Produced by: Alexandra Fechner; Franck Milcent
- Starring: Philippe Lacheau; Élodie Fontan; Julien Arruti; Tarek Boudali; Didier Bourdon; Nathalie Baye
- Cinematography: Dominique Colin
- Edited by: Olivier Michaut-Alchourroun
- Music by: Maxime Desprez; Michael Tordjman
- Production company: Fechner Films
- Distributed by: StudioCanal
- Release date: 15 February 2017
- Running time: 90 minutes
- Country: France
- Language: French
- Budget: $7.6 million
- Box office: $29.3 million

Alibi.com is a 2017 French comedy film. It is directed by Philippe Lacheau.

== Plot ==
Grégory Van Huffel, called Greg, is the head of Alibi.com, an agency that provides people with the alibi they need to keep their affairs secret from their romantic partners.

Greg meets lawyer Florence Martin by chance. While his company is growing successfully, he falls in love with Florence, who, due to bad experiences, considers honesty to be the greatest good in a relationship. Consequently, Greg hides his job info tells her he's a steward.

During a trip to their parents' country house together, Greg discovers that Florence's father Gérard is one of his customers at Alibi.com. While Florence's mother, Marlène, assumes that her husband is on a business trip, Gérard meets with Cynthia in a hotel in Cannes. Various circumstances mean that Florence and her mother also check into the hotel in Cannes, where they meet Gérard. In an emergency, Gérard contacts Greg. To provide Gérard's alibi, Greg had to pretend to Florence that he was traveling to Tanzania. So under no circumstances should he run into her.

In the end, Gérard and Greg become repentant sinners, while Cynthia publishes Alibi.com's customer list on the Internet.

== Cast ==
- Philippe Lacheau as Grégory Van Huffel
- Élodie Fontan as Flo Martin
- Julien Arruti as Augustin
- Tarek Boudali as Mehdi
- Didier Bourdon as Gérard Martin
- Nathalie Baye as Madame Martin
- Nawell Madani as Cynthia
- Philippe Duquesne as Maurice
- Medi Sadoun as Garcia
- Vincent Desagnat as Romain
- Alice Dufour as Clara
- Jo Prestia as Prosper
- Michèle Laroque as Françoise
- Norman Thavaud as Paul-Edouard
- Joeystarr as MC Stocma
- Kad Merad as Monsieur Godet
- Valériane de Villeneuve as Madame Godet
- Chantal Ladesou as The veterinarian
- La Fouine as himself
- François-Xavier Ménage as himself
- Norbert Godji as Doudou
- Samy Naceri as The taxi driver
- Arnaud Makunga as MC Stocma's boyfriend

== Reception ==
=== Box office ===
Alibi.com has grossed $29.3 million worldwide against a production budget of $7.6 million.

=== Critical response ===
On review aggregator Rotten Tomatoes, the film has an approval rating of 67% based on 6 reviews, with an average rating of 5.1/10.

== Remake ==
An Italian remake entitled L'agenzia dei bugiardi (lit. 'The agency of liars') was released in January 2019.
