= Babysitting (film) =

2014 French film by Nicolas Benamou, Philippe Lacheau

- Theatrical poster
- Directed by: Nicolas Benamou; Philippe Lacheau
- Written by: Julien Arruti; Tarek Boudali; Philippe Lacheau; Pierre Lacheau
- Produced by: Christophe Cervoni; Marc Fiszman
- Starring: Philippe Lacheau; Alice David; Vincent Desagnat
- Cinematography: Antoine Marteau
- Edited by: Olivier Michaut-Alchourroun
- Music by: Maxime Desprez; Michael Tordjman
- Production companies: Axel Films; Madame Films; Cinéfrance 1888; Good Lap Production
- Distributed by: Universal Pictures International France
- Release date: 16 April 2014
- Running time: 85 minutes
- Country: France
- Language: French
- Budget: $3.4 million
- Box office: $20.3 million

Babysitting is a 2014 French comedy film shot in the "found footage" style. It is directed by Nicolas Benamou and Philippe Lacheau. The film is also the directorial debut of Philippe Lacheau which he co-wrote and also starred in along with Alice David and Vincent Desagnat.

== Cast ==
- Philippe Lacheau as Franck
- Alice David as Sonia
- Vincent Desagnat as Ernest
- Tarek Boudali as Sam
- Julien Arruti as Alex
- Grégoire Ludig as Paul
- David Marsais as Jean
- Gérard Jugnot as M. Schaudel
- Clotilde Courau as Mme Schaudel
- Philippe Duquesne as Agent Caillaud
- Charlotte Gabris as Estelle
- David Salles as Inspector Laville
- Philippe Brigaud as Monsieur Monet

== Sequel ==
In January 2015, Universal Pictures confirmed that a sequel was in production. It was released in December 2015 and titled Babysitting 2.

== Remake ==
An Italian remake, entitled I babysitter, was released on 19 October 2016.

it was remade by Iain Morris under production by eOne, Angry Films and Moonriver Content.
