= Philippe Lacheau =

French actor, director and writer (born 1980)

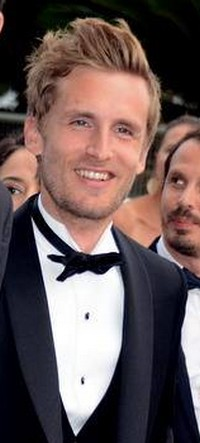
- Philippe Lacheau at the 2014 Cannes Film Festival
- Born: 25 June 1980 (age 46); Fontenay-sous-Bois, France
- Years active: 2002–present

Philippe Lacheau (French pronunciation: [filip laʃo]; born 25 June 1980) is a French actor, director and writer.

== Career ==
From 2002 to 2010, Philippe Lacheau worked on French television for several TV Show like the "Casting Live" (2002), "Total Fun" (2003) and "Pour le meilleur et pour le fun" (2004). He also work with Karl Zéro on "C’est quoi ce jeu ?" (2004), Michel Denisot on Le Grand Journal (2005–07). In 2009, he is a part of the French Silent Library (TV series) produces by Christophe Dechavanne and he joined the team of Laurent Ruquier for a couple of his TV Show.

== Filmography ==
=== Actor ===
Year	Title	Role	Director	Notes
2010	Heartbreaker	The boyfriend	Pascal Chaumeil	
2012	Stars 80	Martial	Frédéric Forestier & Thomas Langmann	
2013	La grande boucle	The commentator	Laurent Tuel	
2013	Paris à tout prix	Firmin Amory	Reem Kherici	Also Writer
2014	Babysitting	Franck	Nicolas Benamou & Philippe Lacheau	Also Director & Writer
2014	Scènes de ménages	Marion's brother	Francis Duquet	TV series (1 episode)
2015	Babysitting 2	Franck	Nicolas Benamou & Philippe Lacheau (2)	Also Director & Writer
2016	The Secret Life of Pets	Max	Chris Renaud & Yarrow Cheney	French Voice
2017	Alibi.com	Grégory Van Huffel	Philippe Lacheau (3)	Also Director & Writer
2017	Épouse-moi mon pote	Fred	Tarek Boudali	
2018	Brillantissime		Michèle Laroque	
2019	Nicky Larson et le parfum de Cupidon	Nicky Larson	Philippe Lacheau (4)	Also Director & Writer
2019	City Hunter: Shinjuku Private Eyes	Shinji Mikuni/Christopher King	Kenji Kodama	Voice; French dub
2020	30 JOURS MAX	Tony	Tarek Boudali	
2021	Super-héros malgré lui	Cédric Dugimont / Badman	Julien Arruti, Pierre Dudan, Pierre Lacheau & Philippe Lacheau (5)	Also Director & Writer
2023	Alibi.com 2	Grégory Van Huffel	Philippe Lacheau (6)	
2024	Heros Nick Lion And Mouse	Philippe	Pierre Palmade	Director Alos & Writer

=== Director / Writer ===
Year	Title	Box Office	Notes
2014	Babysitting	$20.3 million	Alpe d'Huez International Comedy Film Festival - Audience Award; Alpe d'Huez International Comedy Film Festival - Feature Film
2015	Babysitting 2	$24.6 million	
2017	Alibi.com	$29.4 million	
2019	Nicky Larson et le parfum de Cupidon	$14.7 million	Based on City Hunter manga and anime series
2021	Super-héros malgré lui	$14.7 million	
2026	Marsupilami		
